= Eifel =

Low mountain range in Germany

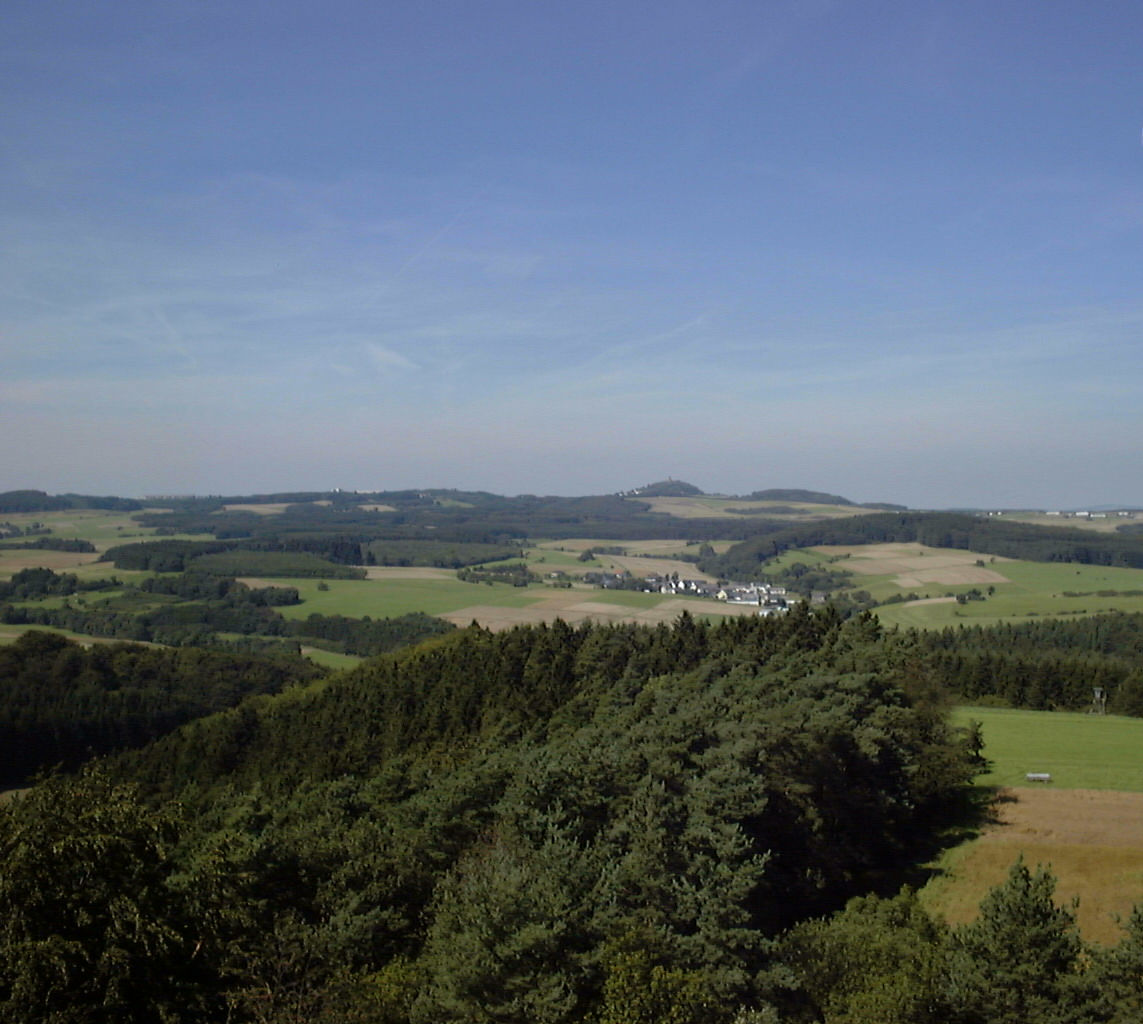

Highest point
- Peak: Hohe Acht
- Elevation: 747 m above sea level (NHN) (2,451 ft)

Dimensions
- Length: 100 km (62 mi)
- Area: 5,300 km^{2} (2,000 mi^{2})

Geography
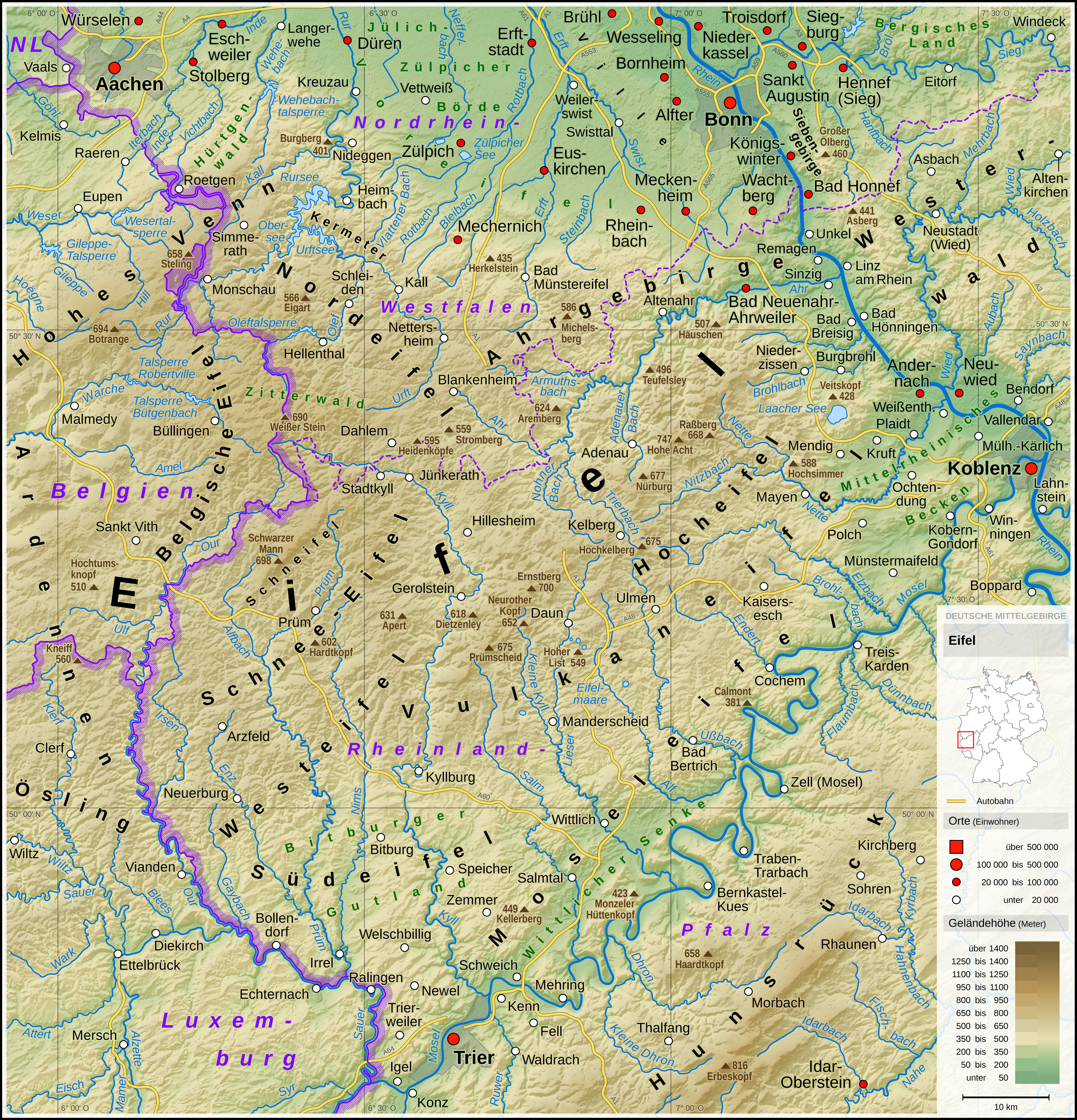
- Map of the Eifel
- Country: Germany, Belgium, Luxembourg, Netherlands
- States: Rhineland-Palatinate; North Rhine-Westphalia
- Range coordinates: 50°23′N 6°52′E
- Parent range: Rhenish Slate Mountains

Geology
- Orogeny: Variscan
- Rock types: slate; limestone; quartzite; sandstone; basalt

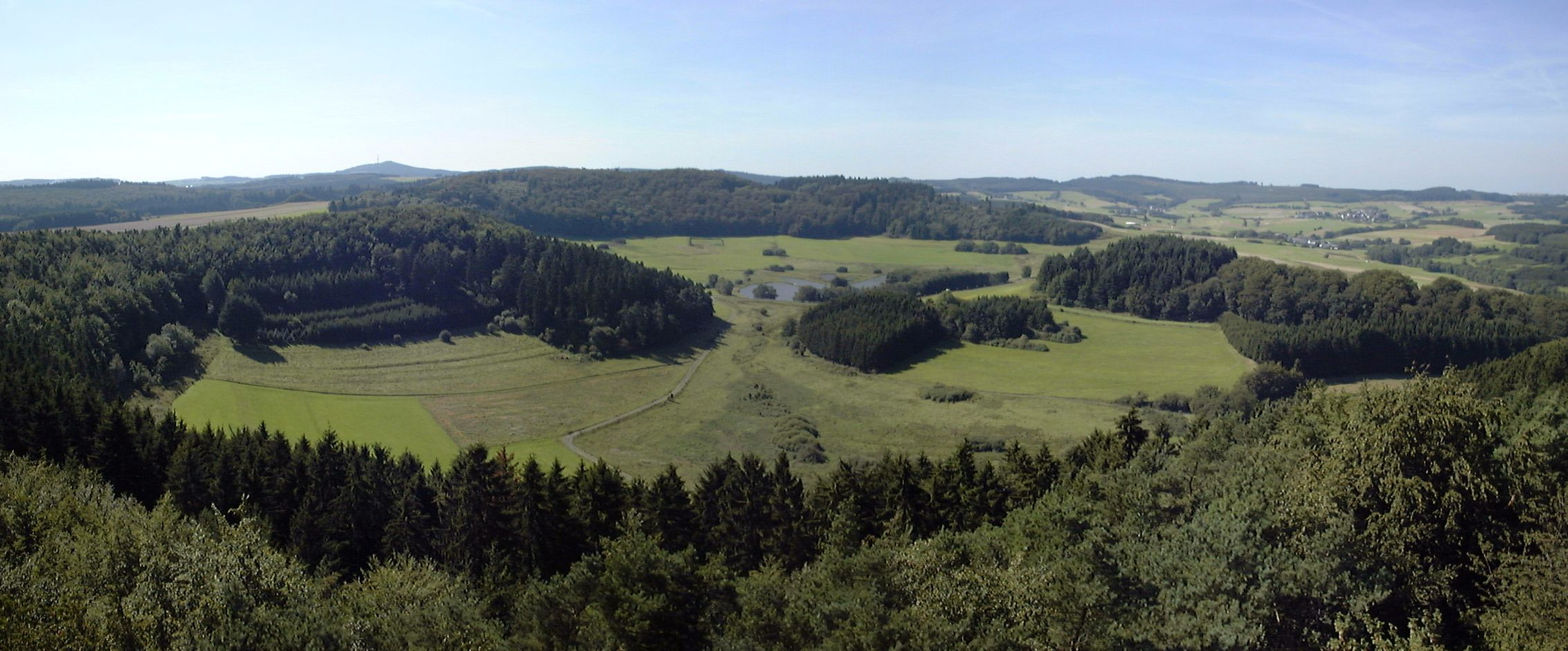
Eifel scenery

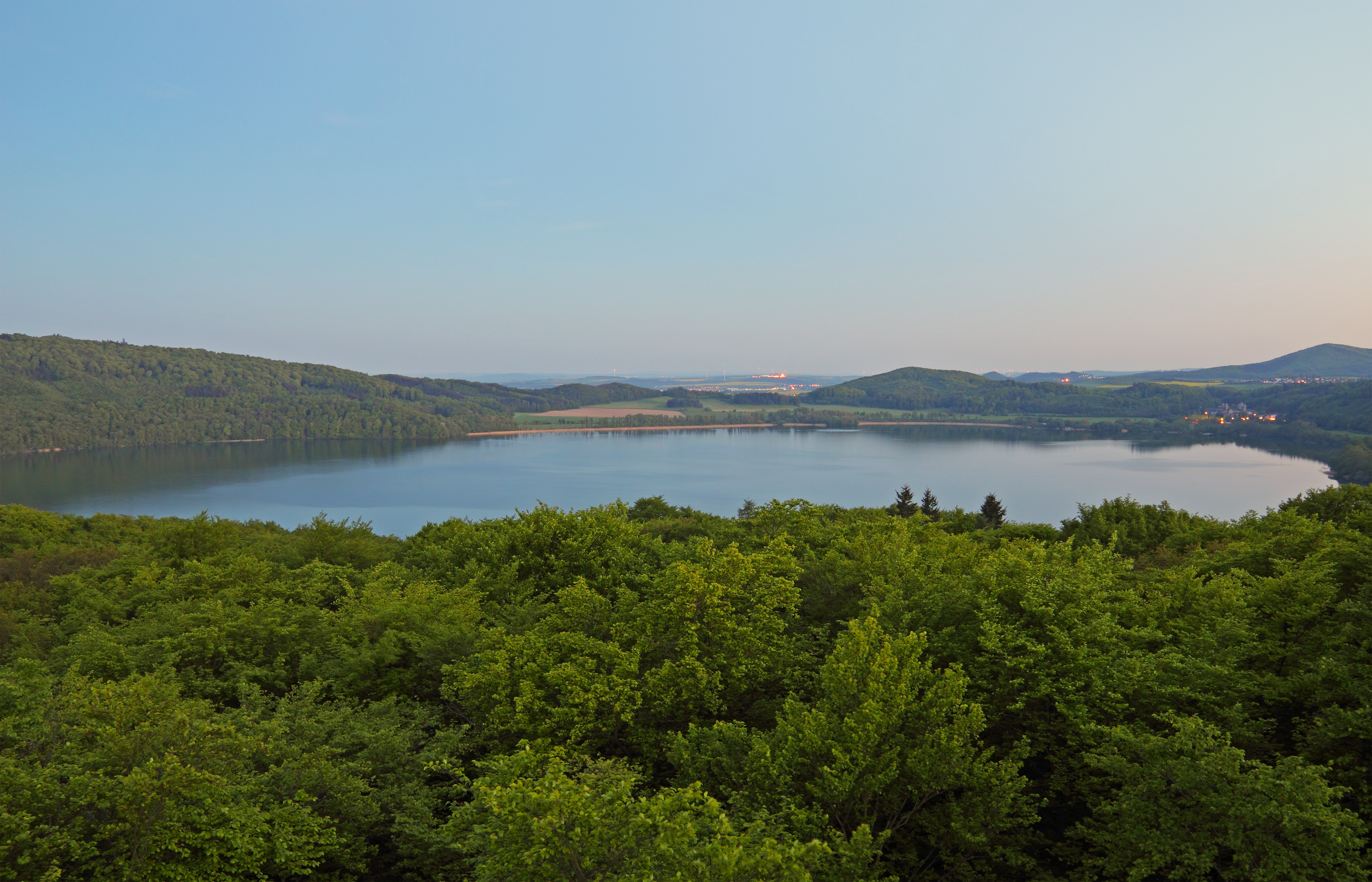
View of the Laacher See, one of the lakes in the Volcanic Eifel

The Eifel (German: [ˈaɪfl̩]; Luxembourgish: Äifel, pronounced [ˈæːɪ̯fəl]) is a middle mountain range in western Germany, eastern Belgium, southeastern Netherlands and northern Luxembourg. It occupies parts of southwestern North Rhine-Westphalia, northwestern Rhineland-Palatinate and the southern area of the German-speaking Community of Belgium.

The Eifel is part of the Rhenish Massif; within its northern portions lies the Eifel National Park. The Eifelian stage in geological history is named after the region because rocks of that period reach the surface in the Eifel at the Wetteldorf Richtschnitt outcrop.

The inhabitants of the Eifel are known as Eiflers or Eifelers.

== Geography ==
=== Location ===
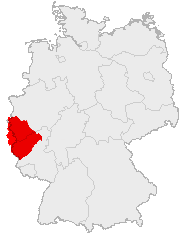
Location of the Eifel in Germany

The Eifel lies between the cities of Aachen to the north, Trier to the south and Koblenz to the east. It descends in the northeast along a line from Aachen via Düren to Bonn into the Lower Rhine Bay. In the east and south it is bounded by the valleys of the Rhine and the Moselle. To the west it transitions in Belgium and Luxembourg into the geologically related Ardennes and the Luxembourg Ösling. In the north it is limited by the Jülich-Zülpicher Börde. Within Germany it lies within the states of Rhineland-Palatinate and North Rhine-Westphalia; in the Benelux the area of Vaals, Eupen, St. Vith and Luxembourg. Its highest point is the volcanic cone of the Hohe Acht (746.9 m; 2,450 ft). Originally the Carolingian Eifelgau only covered the smaller region roughly around the sources of the rivers Ahr, Kyll, Urft and Erft. Its name was more recently transferred to the entire region.

=== Topography ===
The Eifel belongs to that part of the Rhenish Massif whose rolling plateau is categorised as peneplain highland (Rumpfhochland), which was formed by the erosion of the ancient mountains of the Variscan mountain building phase and subsequent further uplifting. Individual mountain chains, up to 700 m (2,300 ft), such as the Schneifel and High Fens, run through the western part of the plateau. In the eastern part, in the High Eifel and Volcanic Eifel, individual cinder cones and basalt kuppen, like the Hohe Acht and the Ernstberg, emerged as a result of volcanicity in the Tertiary and Quaternary periods and rise above the undulating countryside.

The rivers draining into the Moselle, Rhine and Meuse, such as the Our, Kyll, Ahr, Brohlbach and Rur, have cut deep into the edge of the Eifel and formed larger valleys.

The Eifel covers an area of 5,300 km^{2} (2,000 mi^{2}) and is geographically divided into the North and South Eifel. It is further divided into several natural regional landscapes, some with further subdivisions.

=== National and nature parks ===
Since 2004, part of the North Eifel has been designated as the Eifel National Park. There are also four nature parks in the Eifel (from north to south): Rhineland, High Fens-Eifel, Volcanic Eifel, and South Eifel, although the first extends only partly into the northern foothills of the Eifel.

=== Divisions ===
==== Overview ====
There are several distinct chains within the Eifel:

- The northernmost parts are called North Eifel ("Nordeifel") including Rur Eifel the origin of the river Rur, High Fens ("Hohes Venn") and the Limestone Eifel (Kalkeifel).
- The northeastern part is called Ahr Hills (German: Ahrgebirge) and rise north of the Ahr river in the district of Ahrweiler.
- South of the Ahr is the High Eifel (Hohe Eifel), with the Hohe Acht (747 m) being the highest mountain of the Eifel.
- In the west, on the Belgian border, the hills are known as Schneifel (part of the Schnee-Eifel or "Snowy Eifel"), rising up to 698 m (2,290 ft). Also in the west, by the Belgian and Luxembourg border, the region is known as Islek (Aquilania).
- The southern half of the Eifel is lower. It is cut by several rivers running north–south towards the Moselle. The largest of these is the Kyll, and the hills on either side of this river are called the Kyllwald.
- In the south the Eifel is concluded by the Voreifel above the Moselle.

Since 2004, about 110 km^{2} (42 mi^{2}) of the Eifel within the German state of North Rhine-Westphalia have been protected as the Eifel National Park nature reserve.

==== Natural regional divisions ====
Up to 1960, the German part of the Eifel, which belonged to the natural region of the Rhenish Massif, was, according to the Handbook of the Natural Region Divisions of Germany, divided into three major unit (i.e. two-digit) groups and these were subdivided into (three-digit) major natural units. These divisions were subsequently refined in the individual map sheets Trier/Mettendorf, Cochem (both 1974) and Cologne/Aachen (1978) as follows; for the most detailed natural region divisions in Rhineland-Palatinate, fact files were produced by the state information system of the conservation administration (LANDIS):

- 56 Venn Foreland
  - 560 Venn Foothills
    - 560.0 Kornelimünster Venn Foreland
  - 561 Aachen Hills
    - 561.0 Stolberg Valley
    - 561.1 Aachen Bowl
    - 561.2 Aachen Forest
    - 561.3 Vaals Hills
- 28 West Eifel
  - 280 Islek and Ösling (Designation in the map sheets of Cochem and Trier; Handbook: Islek)
    - 280.0 Eastern Islek
      - 280.00 Lascheid Plateau
      - 280.01 Middle Prüm Valley
    - 280.1 Central Islek
      - 280.10 Arzfeld Plateau
      - 280.11 Neuerburg Enz Valley
      - 280.12 Karlshausen Plateau
    - 280.2 Western Islek
      - 280.20 Leidenborn Plateau
      - 280.21 Winterscheid Plateau
    - 280.3 Middle Our Valley
      - 280.30 Urb-Vianden Our Valley (Cochem map sheet; Trier map sheet: Vianden Our Valley)
      - 280.31 Genting Our Valley
    - 280.4 Southern Schneifel Foreland
    - 280.5 Islek Foothills
  - 281 Western High Eifel
    - 281.0 Schneifel Ridge
    - 281.1 Northern Schneifel Foreland
      - 281.10 Brandscheid Schneifel Foreland
      - 281.11 Manderfeld Schneifel Foreland
    - 281.2 Grenzwald Ridge
      - 281.20 Ommerscheid
      - 281.21 Losheim Forest
    - 281.3 Oberes Kyll Valley
    - 281.4 Duppach Ridge
  - 282 Rur Eifel
    - 282.0 Düren Eifel Foothills
    - 282.1 Hürtgen Plateau
    - 282.2 Monschau Hedge Land
    - 282.3 Rur-Urft-Olef Valleys
      - 282.30 Monschau-Rurberg Rur Valley
      - 282.31 Gemünd Urft and Olef Valleys
      - 282.32 Urftsee Region
      - 282.33 Rursee Region
      - 282.34 Heimbach-Maubach Rur Valley
    - 282.4 Monschau-Hellenthal Forest Plateau
    - 282.5 Dreiborn Plateau
    - 282.6 Hollerath-Broich Plateau
      - 282.60 Hollerath Plateau
      - 282.61 Broich Plateau
    - 282.7 Wildenburg Plateau
    - 282.8 Kermeter Forest
  - 283 High Fens
    - 283.0 Venn Plateau
      - 283.00 Lammersdorf Fen Plateau
    - 283.1 Northern Venn Foothills
      - 283.10 Roetgen Venn Foothills
    - Roer Spring Plateau (entirely in Belgium)
    - Upland of the Upper Warche (Southern Venn Foreland; entirely in Belgium)
  - Eastern High Ardennes (entirely in Belgium)
    - St. Vith Plateau
- 27 East Eifel
  - 270 Moselle Eifel (Lower Eifel)
    - 270.0 Eastern Moselle Eifel
      - 270.00 Elz Valley
      - 270.01 Kaisersesch Eifel Perimeter
      - 270.02 Gevenich Plateau
    - 270.1 Lower Üßbach Valley
    - 270.2 Kondelwald
    - 270.3 Offling Plateau
    - 270.4 Middle Lieser Valley
    - 270.5 Southern Volcanic Eifel
      - 270.50 Daun-Manderscheid Volcanic Hills
      - 270.51 Dauner Maar Region
    - 270.6 Wittlich Hedge Land (Cochem map sheet; Trier map sheet: Heckenland)
      - 270.60 Naurather Horst
      - 270.61 Arenrath Plateau
      - 270.62 Littgen Plateau
    - 270.7 Meulenwald
  - 271 Eastern High Eifel
    - 271.0 Olbrück Eifel Perimeter
    - 271.1 Kempenich Tuff Plateau
    - 271.2/3 Central Eastern High Eifel
      - 271.2 Hohe Acht/Nitz-Nette Upland
        - 271.20 Hohe Acht Upland
        - 271.21 Nitz-Nette Forest
      - 271.3 Elzbach Heights
    - 271.4 Southwest foothills of the Eastern High Eifel
      - 271.40 Trierbach-Lieser Source Upland
      - 271.41 Üßbach Upland
      - 271.42 Müllenbach Riedelland
      - 271.43 Middle Üßbach Valley
  - 272 Ahr Eifel
    - 272.0 Reifferscheid Upland
    - 272.1 Northern Ahr Upland
    - 272.2 Middle Ahr Valley
      - 272.20 Dümpelfeld Ahr Valley
      - 272.21 Recher Ahreng Valley
    - 272.3 Southern Ahr Upland
  - 274 Münster Eifel Forest and Northeastern Foot of the Eifel (Cologne map sheet; Cochem map sheet: Northeastern Eifel Perimeter; Handbook: Münster Eifel Forest)
    - 274.0 Münstereifel Valley
    - 274.1 Münstereifel Forest (Flamersheim Forest)
    - 274.2 Swist Eifel Foothills (Rheinbach Forest)
    - 274.3 Königsfeld Eifel Foothills (Cochem map sheet; Cologne map sheet and LANIS: Königsfeld Rhine-Eifel Foot)
  - 275 Mechernich Pre-Eifel
    - 275.0 Wollersheim Scarpland
    - 275.1 Vlatten Hills
    - 275.2 Mechernich Uplands
    - 275.3 Antweil Basin
    - 275.4 Billig Ridge
  - 276 Limestone Eifel
    - 276.0 Sötenich Limestone Basin
    - 276.1 Blankenheim and Zingsheim Forest
      - 276.10 Zingsheim Forest
      - 276.11 Blankenheim Forest
    - 276.2 Blankenheim Limestone Ridge
    - 276.3 Eichholz Ridge
    - 276.4 Rohr Limestone Basin
    - 276.5 Dollendorf Limestone Basin
    - 276.6 Senkenbusch
    - 276.7 Ahrdorf-Hillesheim Limestone Basin
      - 276.70 Ahrdorf Limestone Basin
      - 276.71 Hillesheim Limestone Basin
    - 276.8 Northern Volcanic Eifel
      - 276.80 Kyll Volcanic Eifel
      - 276.81 Dockweiler Volcanic Eifel
    - 276.9 Southern Limestone Basin
      - 276.90 Gerolstein Limestone Basin
      - 276.91 Prüm Limestone Basin
  - 277 Kyllburg Waldeifel
    - 277.0 Neidenbach Sandstone Plateau
    - 277.1 Middle Kyll Valley
    - 277.2 Kyllburg Forest Ridge
      - 277.20 Prümscheid
      - 277.21 Wittlich Forest
    - 277.3 Salm Hills

The BfN groups the 3 (two-digit) major unit groups under the combined group designated D45.

=== Mountains and hills ===
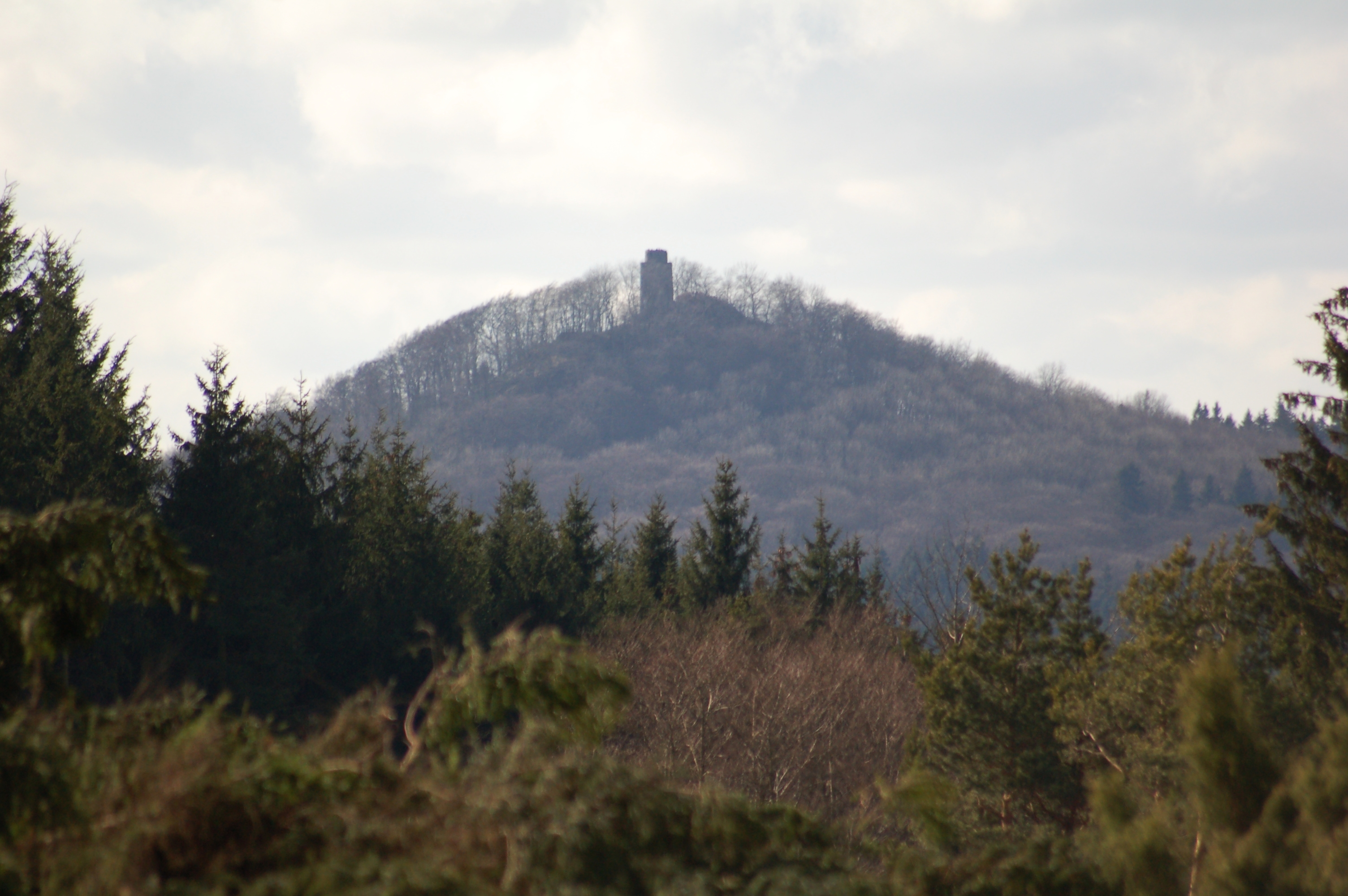
View from the Raßberg of the striking dome of the Hohe Acht

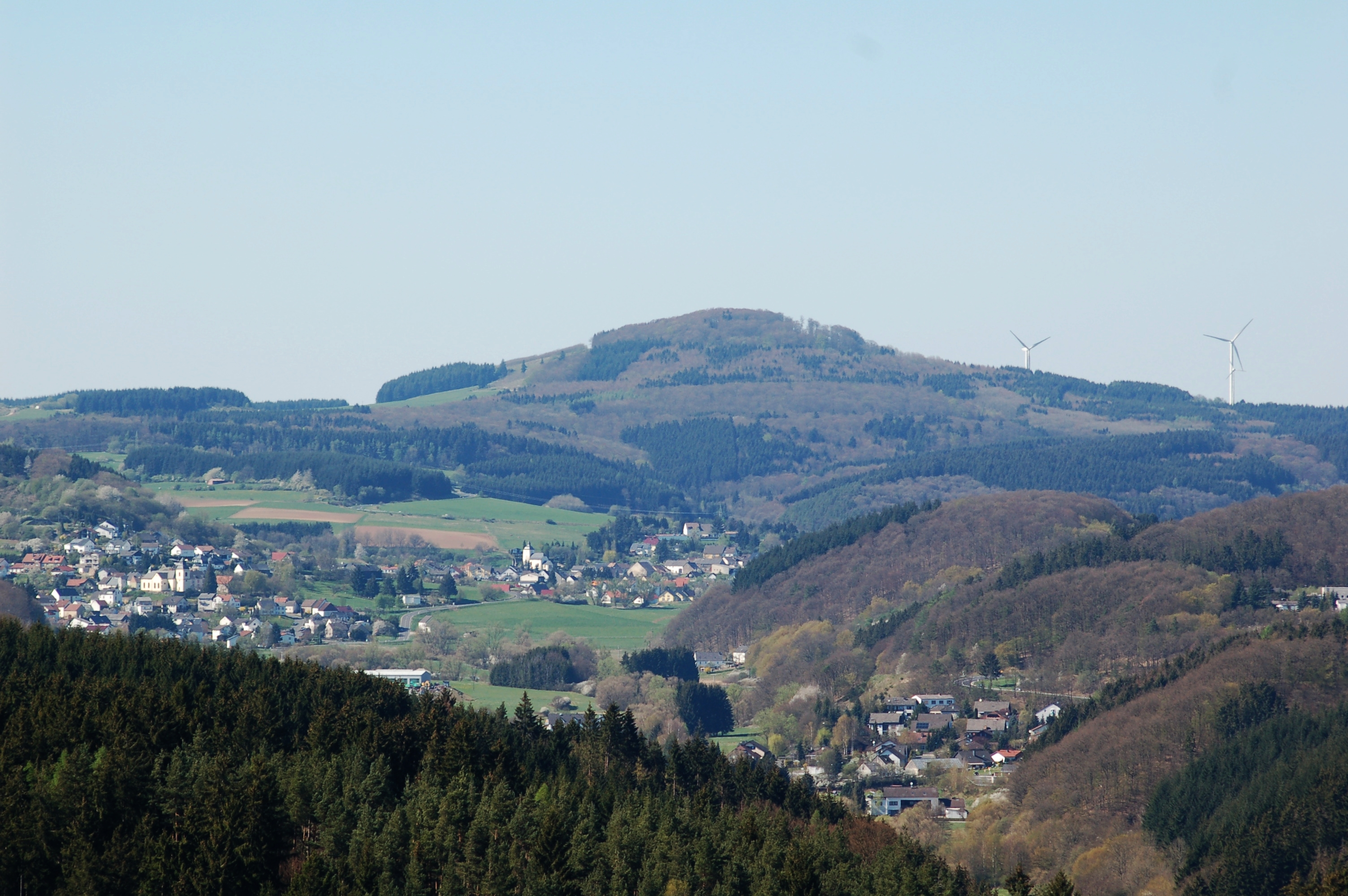
View of the Ernstberg from the Mäuseberg to the southeast

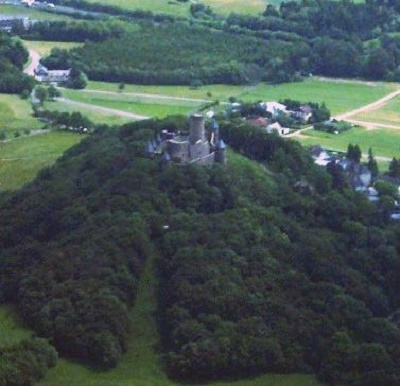
Castle hill of Nürburg from the air

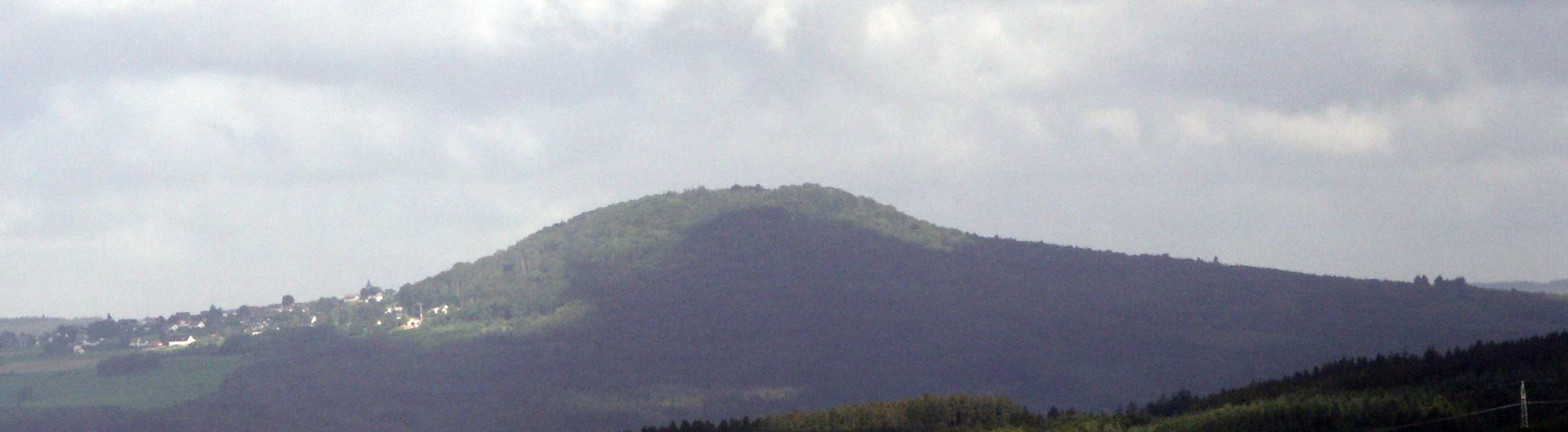
The Aremberg and the village of Aremberg seen from the south-southeast

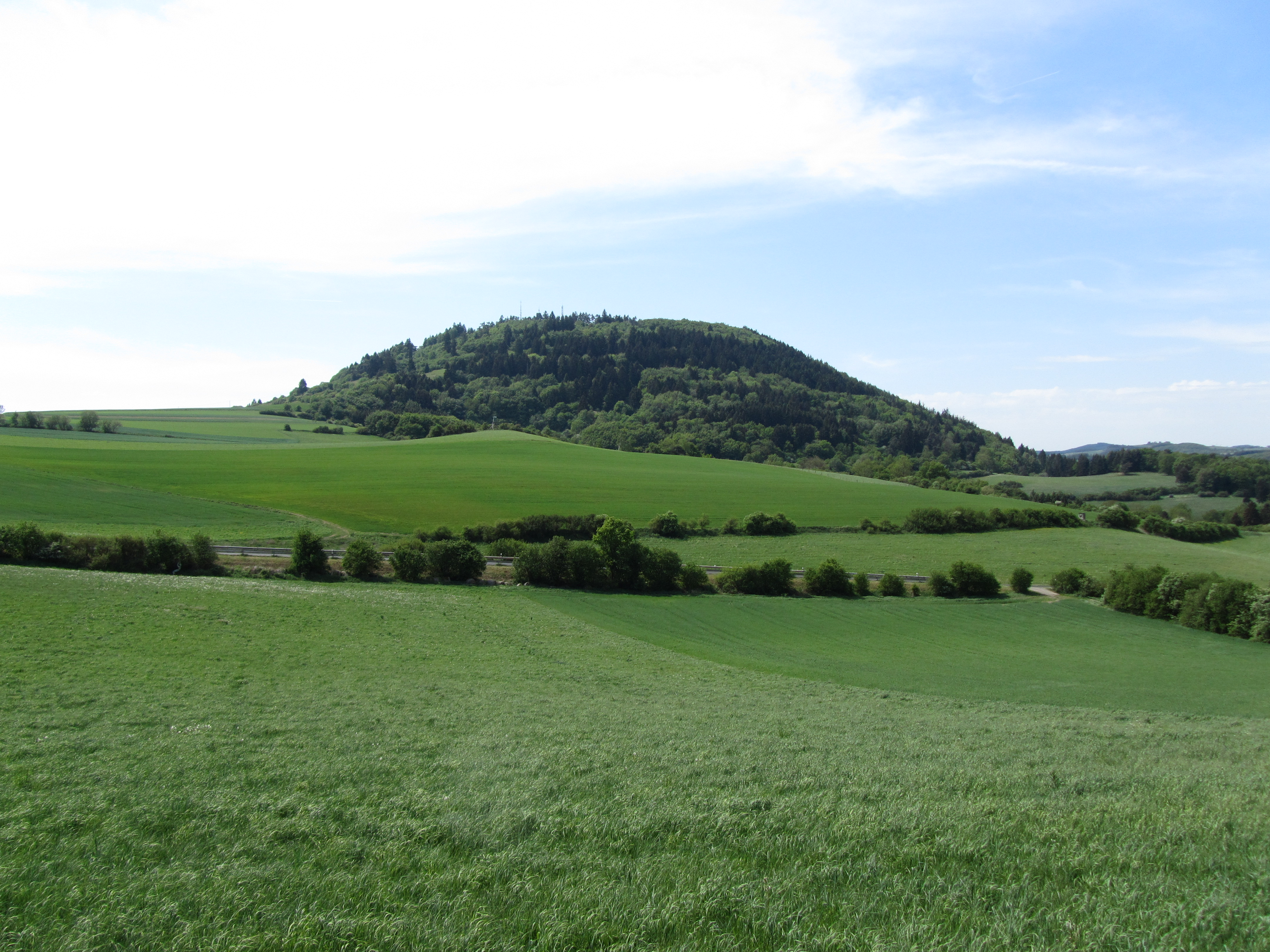
The Hochsimmer from the east-northeast

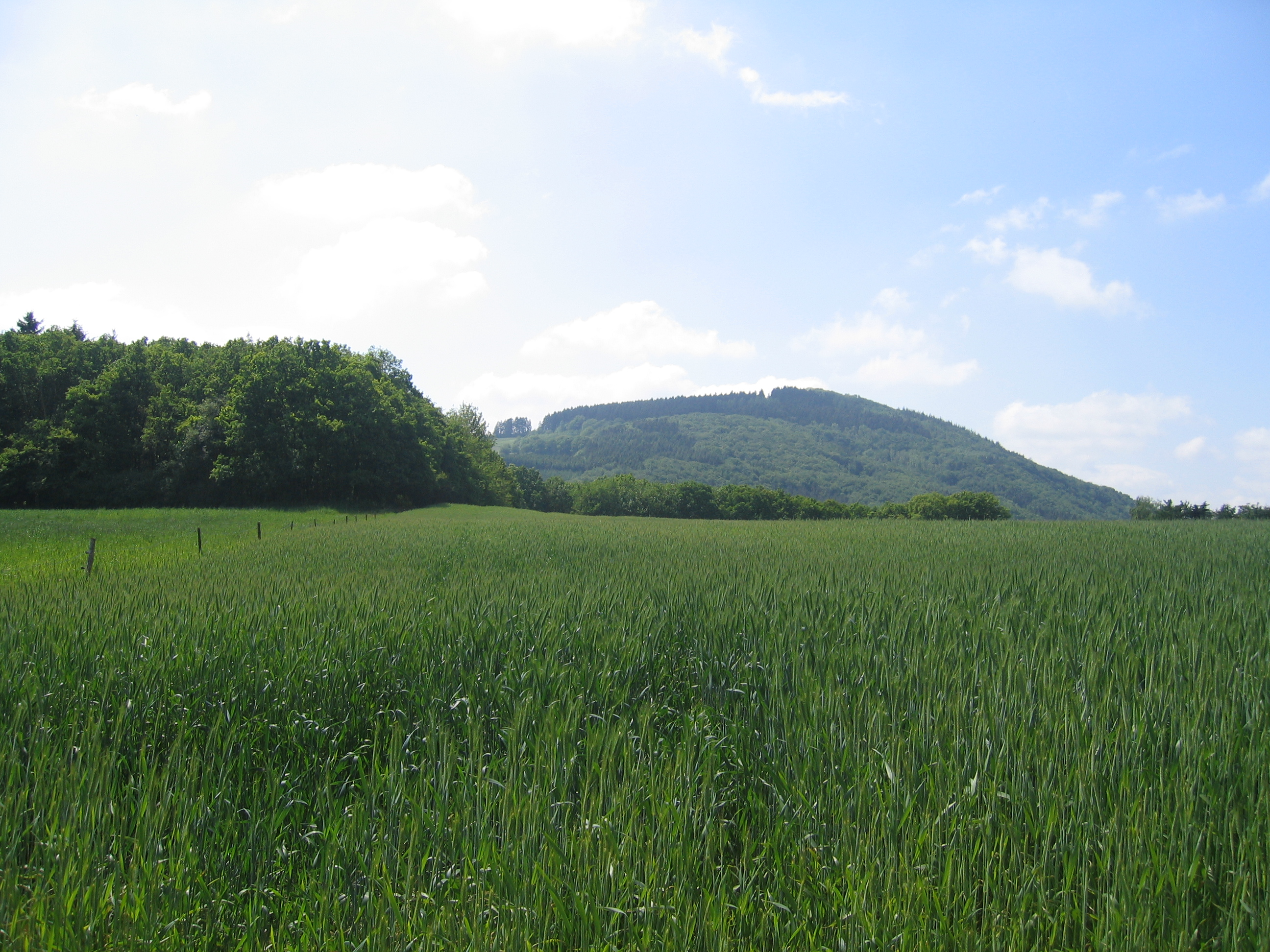
View from Houverath looking south to the Hochthürmerberg

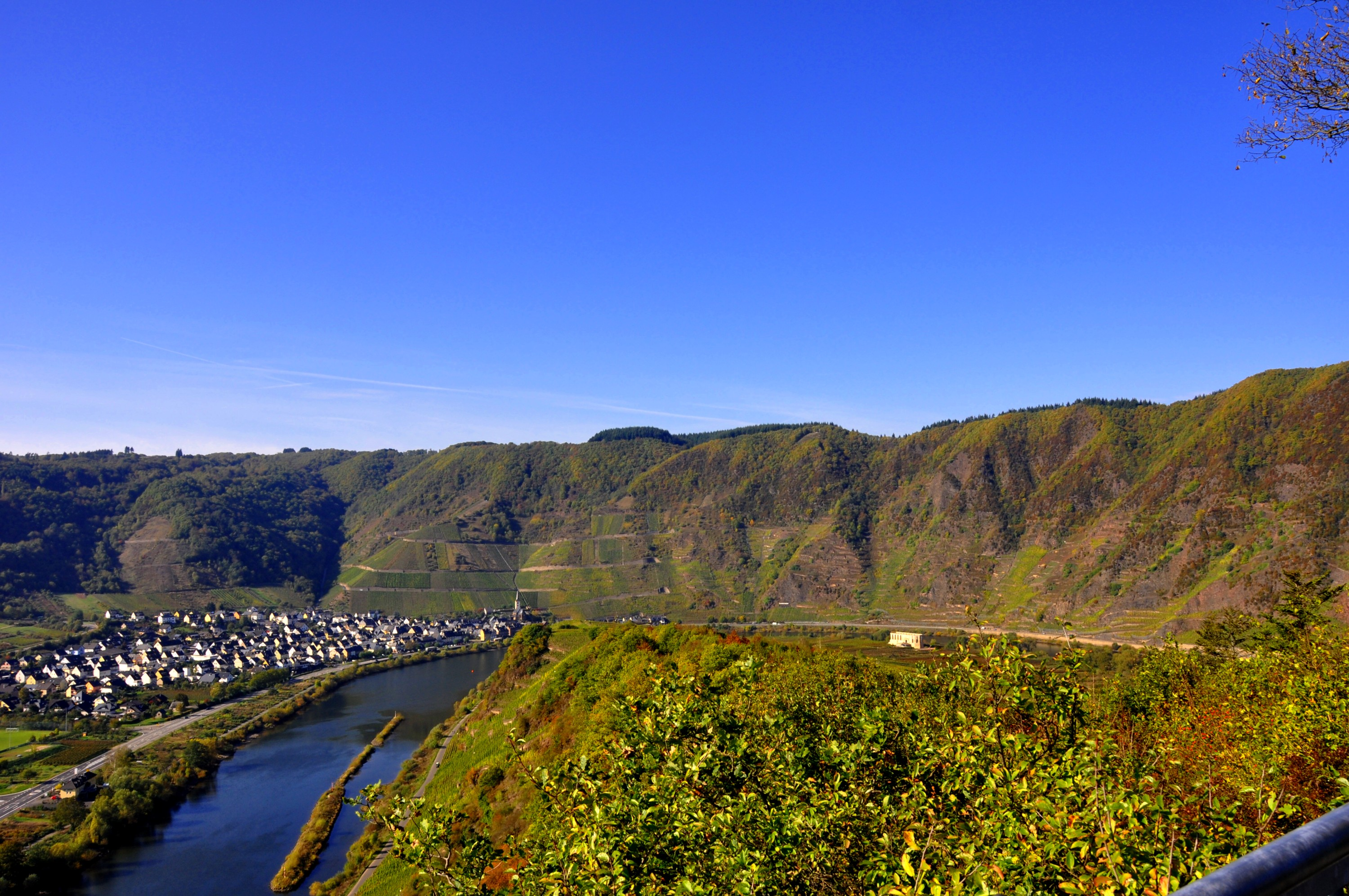
View over the Moselle and past the village of Dorf Bremm to the Calmont

Apart from its valleys, the Eifel is a gently rolling plateau from which elongated mountain ridges and individual mountains rise. The majority of these summits do not attain a great height above the surrounding terrain. Several, however, like the Schwarzer Mann in the Schnee-Eifel, stand out from a long way off as long, forested ridges or clearly isolated mountaintops.

The highest mountain in the whole Eifel is the Hohe Acht at 746.9 m. It is the only Eifel summit above 700 m. However, many peaks, mountain ridges and large regions, such as the Zitterwald reach heights of over 600 m. These include two dozen peaks with good all-round views, of which many have an observation tower. From north to south they are: the Michelsberg, Häuschen and Teufelsley in the north; the Adert, Hohe Acht and Raßberg in the northeast; the Hochkel, Nerotherkopf, Dietzenley and ruins of the Kasselburg in the central area; the Prümer Kalvarienberg, Hartkopf and Prümer Kopf in the east, the Steineberg and Mäuseberg near Daun, the Hochsimmer and Scheidkopf near Mayen; the Eickelslay and Absberg in the southeast; and the Krautscheid and Hohe Kuppe in the southwest.

The mountains and hills of the Eifel include the following (in order of height in metres above sea level):

Mountain/hill	Height (m)	Lowest level natural region	No. (natural region)	Natural region major unit
Hohe Acht	746.9	Hohe Acht Upland	271.20	Eastern High Eifel
Ernstberg (Erresberg)	699.8	Prümscheid	277.20	Kyllburger Waldeifel
unnamed summit (near Schwarzer Mann)	699.1	Schneifelrücken	281.0	Western High Eifel
Schwarzer Mann	697.8	Schneifel Ridge	281.0	Western High Eifel
Botrange	694.24	Venn Plateau	283.0	High Fens (Belgium)
Scharteberg	691.4	Prümscheid	277.20	Kyllburger Waldeifel
Weißer Stein	690	Monschau-Hellenthal Forest Plateau	282.4	Rur Eifel
Prümscheid	682	Prümscheid	277.20	Kyllburger Waldeifel
Castle hill of the Nürburg	676.5	Hohe Acht Upland	271.20	Eastern High Eifel
Hochkelberg	674.9	Trierbach-Lieser Spring Upland	271.40	Eastern High Eifel
Raßberg	663.8	Hohe Acht Upland	271.20	Eastern High Eifel
Steling	658.3	Venn Plateau	283.0	High Fens (Belgium)
Döhmberg	653.2	Dockweil Volcanic Eifel	276.81	Limestone Eifel
Nerother Kopf	651.7	Daun-Manderscheid Volcanoes	270.50	Moselle Eifel
unnamed summit (near Gondelsheim)	651.3	Duppach Ridge	281.4	Western High Eifel
Radersberg	637	Dockweil Volcanic Eifel	276.81	Limestone Eifel
Apert	631.3	Kyll Volcanic Eifel	276.80	Limestone Eifel
Aremberg	623.8	Kempenich Tuff Plateau	271.1	Eastern High Eifel
unnamed summit (near Schöneseiffen)	622.7	Dreiborn Plateau	282.5	Rur Eifel
Dietzenley	617.6	Prümscheid	277.20	Kyllburger Waldeifel
Asseberg	601.5	Prümscheid	277.20	Kyllburger Waldeifel
Hardtkopf	601.5	Southern Schneifel Foreland	280.4	Islek and Ösling
Alterfaß/Alter Voß	589.9	Dockweil Volcanic Eifel	276.81	Limestone Eifel
Heidenköpfe	595	Eichholz Ridge	276.3	Limestone Eifel
Hochsimmer	587.9	Nitz-Nette Forest	271.21	Eastern High Eifel
Michelsberg	586.1	Northern Ahr Hills	272.1	Ahr Eifel
Langschoß	583.5	Lammersdorf Venn Plateau	283.0	High Fens
Gänsehals	575.3	Kempenich Tuff Plateau	271.1	Eastern High Eifel
Eigart	565.5	Dreiborn Plateau	282.5	Rur Eifel
Hochstein	563.0	Ettringer Vulkankuppen	292.01	Lower Middle Rhine region
Mäuseberg	561.2	Daun Maar Region	270.51	Moselle Eifel
Stromberg	558.2	Eichholz Ridge	276.3	Limestone Eifel
Rockeskyller Kopf	554.6	Dockweil Volcanic Eifel	276.81	Limestone Eifel
Hoher List	549.1	Daun Maar Region	270.51	Moselle Eifel
Roßbüsch	538.6	Kyll Volcanic Eifel	276.80	Limestone Eifel
Knippberg	537.3	Münstereifel Forest	274.1	Münstereifel Forest and Northeastern Foot of the Eifel
Kuhdorn	532.1	Kyll Volcanic Eifel	276.80	Limestone Eifel
Burberg	528.5	Salm Hill Country	277.3	Kyllburger Waldeifel
unnamed summit (near Wolfgarten)	527.8	Kermeter Forest	282.8	Rur Eifel
Wildbretshügel	525.3	Kermeter Forest	282.8	Rur Eifel
Kalvarienberg	522.8	Dollendorfer Kalkmulde	276.5	Limestone Eifel
Verbrannter Berg	516.2	Kermeter Forest	282.8	Rur Eifel
Kopnück near Kop Nück	514.4	Northern Ahr Hills	272.1	Ahr Eifel
Rother Hecke	510.5	Kyll Volcanic Eifel	276.80	Limestone Eifel
Häuschen	506.5	Southern Ahr Hills	272.3	Ahr Eifel
Hochthürmen	499.9	Northern Ahr Hills	272.1	Ahr Eifel
Teufelsley	495.9	Southern Ahr Hills	272.3	Ahr Eifel
Krufter Ofen	463.1	Laacher Kuppenland	292.0	Lower Middle Rhine region
Kellerberg	448.8	Naurather Horst	270.60	Moselle Eifel
Herkelstein	434.5	Mechernich Upland and Hill Country	275.2	Mechernich Voreifel
unnamed summit (near Osann-Monzel)	434.1	Moselle Hills	250.2	Moselle Valley
Stockert	433.9	Mechernich Upland and Hill Country	275.2	Mechernich Voreifel
Veitskopf	428.1	Laacher Kuppenland	292.0	Lower Middle Rhine region
Monzeler Hüttenkopf	423.4	Moselle Hills	250.2	Moselle Valley
Burgberg	400.8	Hürtgen Plateau	282.1	Rur Eifel
Thelenberg	400.2	Laacher Kuppenland	292.0	Lower Middle Rhine region
Sonnenberg	393.3	Kermeter Forest	282.8	Rur Eifel
Calmont	378.4	Gevenich Plateau	270.02	Moselle Eifel
Bausenberg	339.8	Königsfelder Eifelrand	274.3	Münstereifel Forest and Northeastern Foot of the Eifel
Vaalserberg	322,4	Hürtgen Plateau	282.0	Rur Eifel
Landskrone	271.7	Oberwinter Terraces and Hills	292.23	Lower Middle Rhine region

For a list of these and other Eifel mountains and hills see the List of mountains and hills of the Eifel.

Many of these prominent points are linked by the Eifel-Ardennes Green Route, which crosses the east and south of the region, the German Volcano Route, the German Wildlife Route and the South Eifel Holiday Route.

=== Water bodies ===
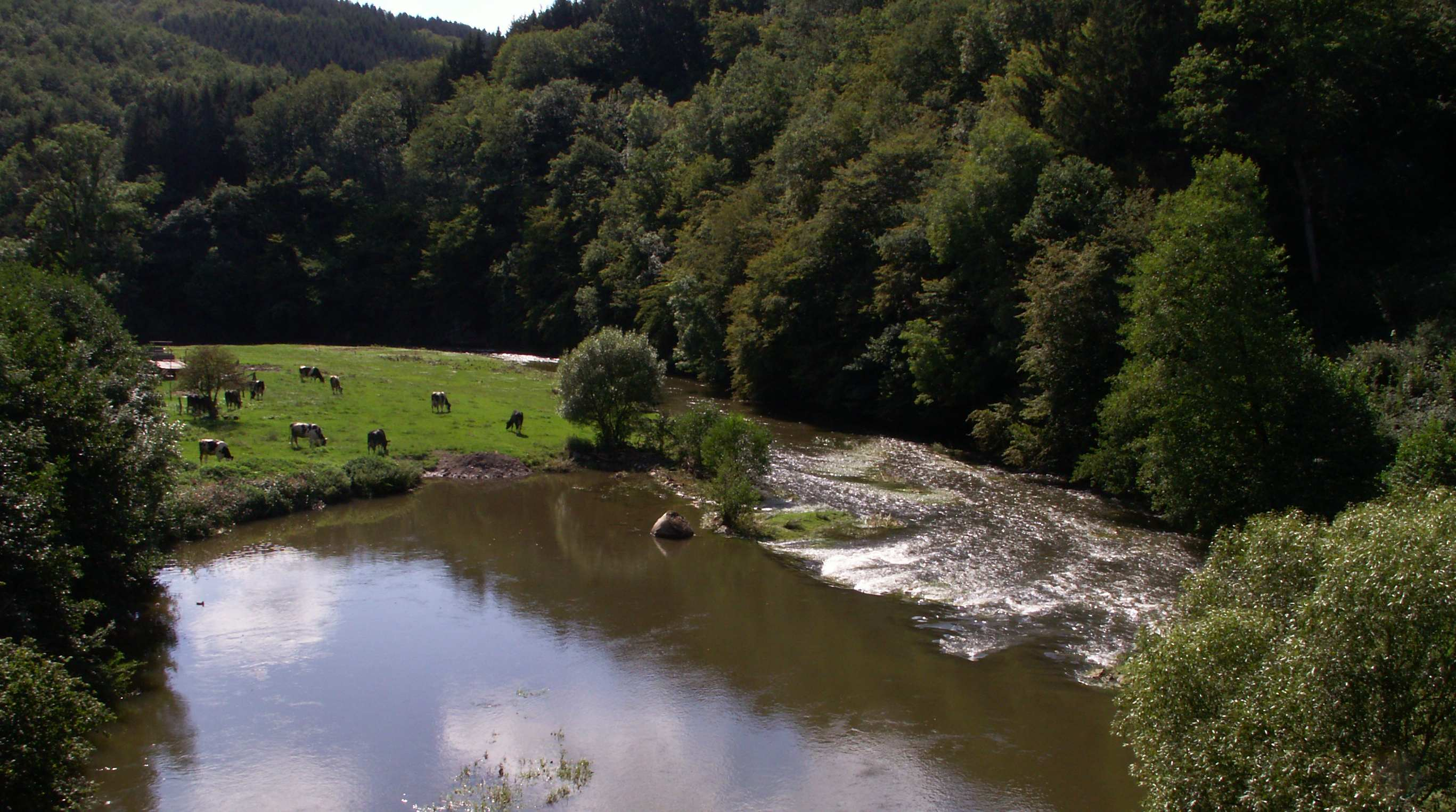
The Prüm

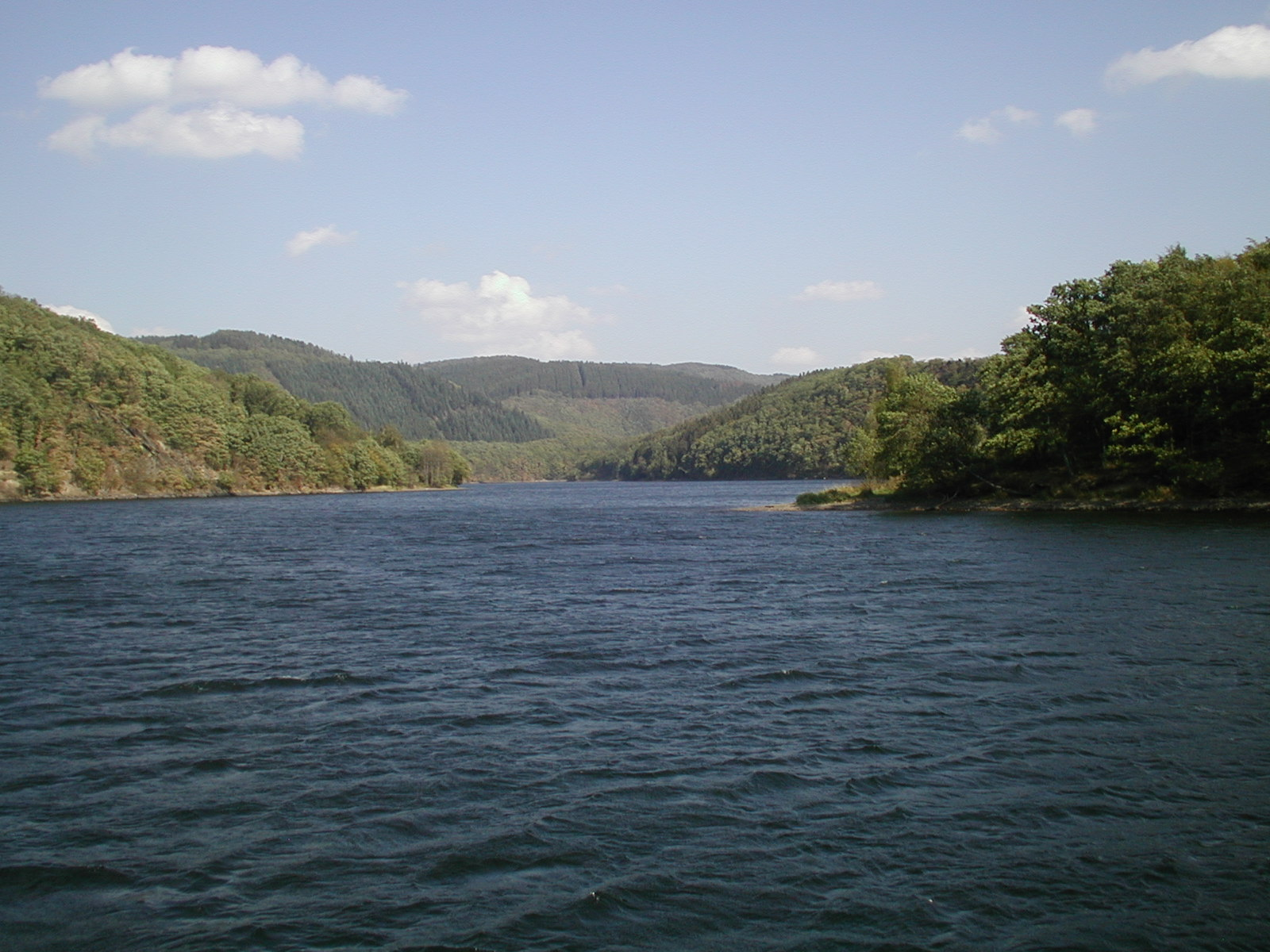
Upper basin of the Rur Reservoir between Einruhr and Rurberg

Due to its moist and mild Atlantic climate, the Eifel is bisected by numerous streams and small rivers. Impoundment of these streams, especially in the North Eifel has led to the creation of very large reservoir, such as the Rursee, which is the second largest in Germany by volume, and the Urftsee.

A feature of the Eifel are its natural lakes of volcanic origin. The largest, the Laacher See, is a collapsed, water-filled caldera, whilst the many maars are water-filled volcanic eruption bowls. The largest maar lake is the Pulvermaar. The Meerfelder Maar has an even bigger basin, but three-quarters of it has silted up.

==== Rivers and streams ====
The many rivers and streams of the Eifel drain into the North Sea via the great rivers outside of the Eifel: the Rhine (and its tributary, the Moselle) and the Meuse (with its tributaries, the Rur and Ourthe). The rivers and streams within the mountain range, together with their larger tributaries, are as follows:

Rhine tributaries:

- Moselle (outside of the Eifel)
  - Sauer
    - Prüm
      - Nims
      - Enz
      - Alfbach
      - Mehlenbach
    - Our (river)
      - Irsen
      - Ihrenbach
  - Kyll
  - Salm
  - Lieser
    - Kleine Kyll
  - Alf
    - Üßbach
    - Sammetbach
  - Elzbach
- Nette
  - Nitzbach
- Brohlbach
- Vinxtbach
- Ahr
  - Schaafbach
  - Ahbach
  - Trierbach
  - Dreisbach
  - Armuthsbach
  - Adenauerbach
  - Liersbach
  - Sahrbach
  - Vischelbach
  - Leimersdorfer Bach
- Erft
  - Swist
    - Eulenbach
  - Veybach (Feybach)
    - Krebsbach
    - Kühlbach

Meuse tributaries:

- Rur
  - Perlenbach
  - Urft
    - Olef
      - Platißbach
        - Prether Bach
      - Reifferscheider Bach
      - Diefenbach
      - Rosselbach
    - Genfbach
    - Gillesbach
    - Kuttenbach
    - Laufbach
    - Wisselsbach
  - Inde
    - Vichtbach
- Ourthe (outside Eifel)
  - Amel
    - Warche
      - Warchenne
      - Bayehon
  - Vesdre (Weser)
    - Hill

==== Lakes and reservoirs ====
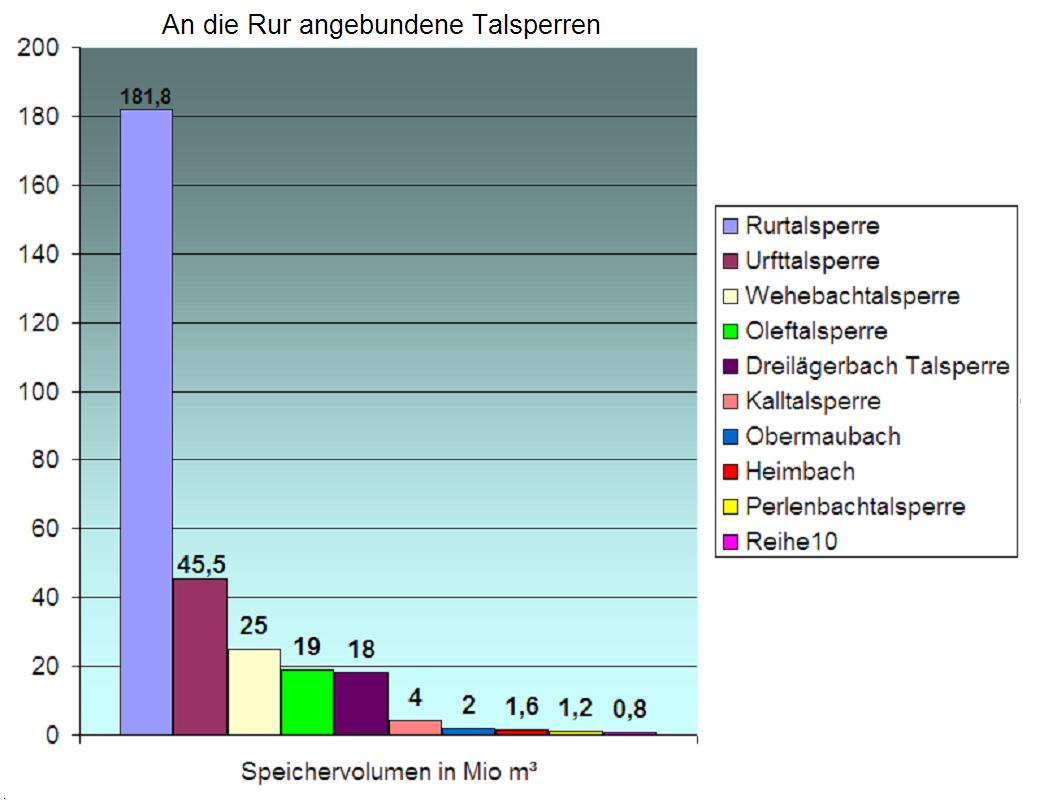
Reservoirs of the Eifel that drain into the Rur

Reservoirs

- Bitburg Reservoir
- Weilerbach Reservoir (Freilinger See)
- Kronenburg Reservoir (Kronenburger See)
- Olef Reservoir
- Gileppe Reservoir
- Rur Reservoir
- Urft Reservoir
- Wehebach Reservoir
- Weser Reservoir (Weser, near Eupen)
- Dreilägerbach Reservoir
- Perlenbach Reservoir
- Kall Reservoir
- Lake Bütgenbach
- Lake Robertville
- Madbach Reservoir
- Steinbach Reservoir

Volcanic lakes

- Laacher See
- Pulvermaar
- Schalkenmehrener Maar
- Gemündener Maar
- Holzmaar
- Meerfelder Maar
- Weinfelder Maar or Totenmaar
- Ulmener Maar
- Eichholzmaar
- Windsborn Crater Lake

== Geology ==
Despite the interesting geology of the Eifel region, only three comprehensive geological accounts have been produced. In 1822, Johann Steiniger published the first geological map of the area and, in 1853, the Geognostische Beschreibung der Eifel. In 1915 Otto Follmann published a new account, adding to the extent of scientific understanding at that time, the Abriss der Geologie der Eifel ("Abstract of the geology of the Eifel region". In 1986, Wilhelm Meyer finally published the volume, Geologie der Eifel ("Geology of the Eifel"), whose fourth, revised, edition is now regarded as the standard work on the geology of the Eifel.

The Eifel and its western continuation into Belgium, the Ardennes, are the remains of a Variscan truncated upland, much of it 400 million years old, that is part of the Rhenish Massif (Rheinisches Schiefergebirge). In the area of the Stavelot-Venn Saddle (Hohes Venn) are the oldest layers of rock, which originate from the Cambrian and are around 550 million years old. The Eifel is one of the few volcanically active areas of Germany, as is evinced by numerous discharges of carbonic acid, for example into the Laacher See. The last eruptions, which gave rise to the most recent maars, occurred about 11,000 years ago.

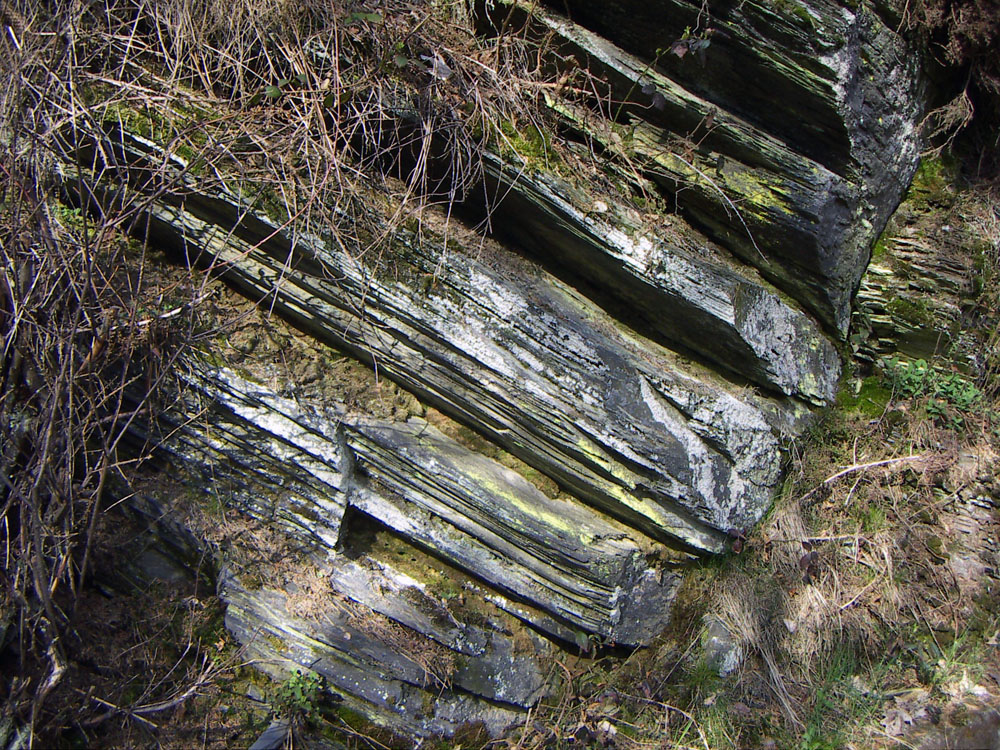
Dark argillaceous slate of the Siegen stage (deep Lower Devonian, between 410 and 405 million years old), near Monschau in the northern Eifel

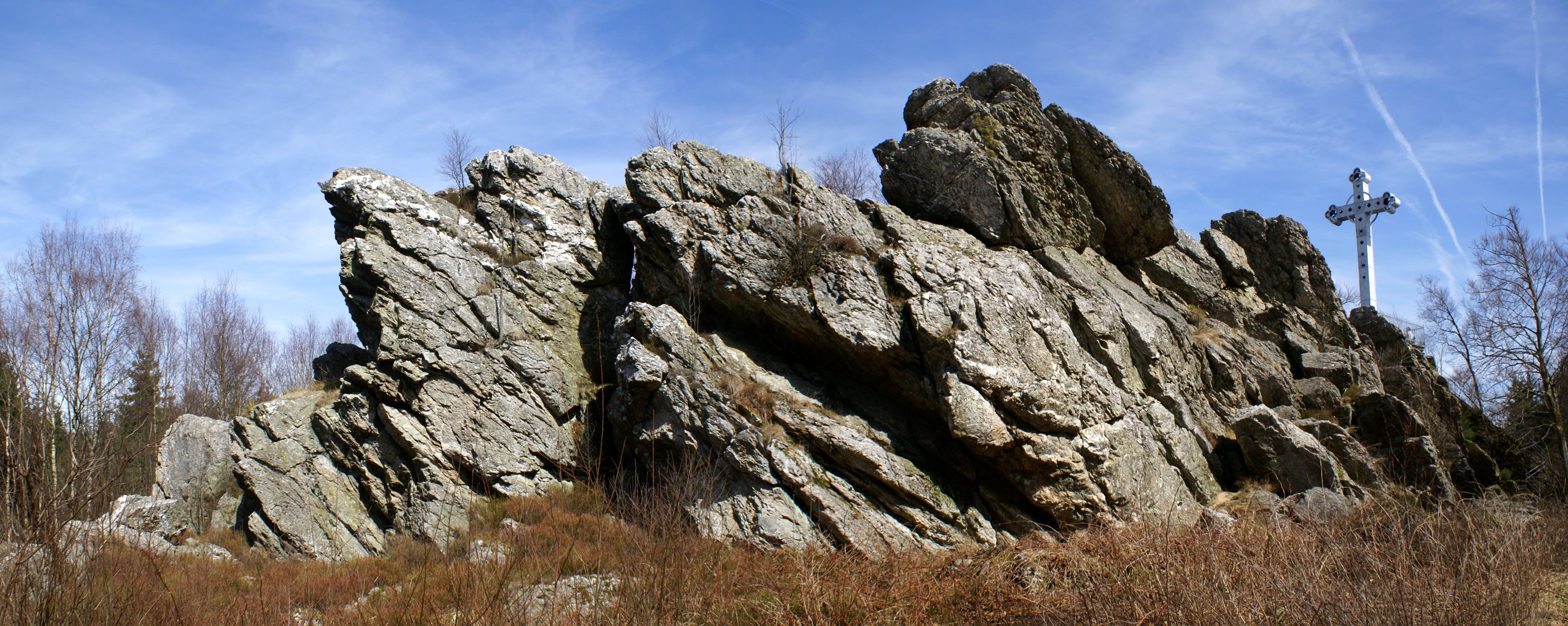
The Richelsley, an erosion remnant of conglomerates of the Gedinne stage (deepest Lower Devonian, c. 415 million years old), west of Monschau in the Belgian Eifel

=== Basement ===
The basement in the Eifel, as in the other regions of the Rhenish Massif, consists mainly of Devonian slates, sandstones and limestones, laid down in an ocean south of the Old Red Continent and folded and overthrust in the Variscan orogeny. Only on the northern edge of the Eifel, in the High Fens and its environs, do older rocks from the Cambrian and Ordovician outcrop. Rocks of the Carboniferous do not occur in the Eifel itself, but lie along its northern boundary in the region of Aachen.

The Devonian rocks were deposited in an oceanic basin, in which erosion debris was washed in from the north from the great north continent of Euramerica (Laurussia or the Old Red Continent) which was formed by Caledonian mountain building during the Silurian. From the end of the Lower Carboniferous the sea basin was caught up in the Variscan mountain building process, pushed together and uplifted, and thus formed part of the Variscan mountain system that, in the Upper Carboniferous and early Permian, covered large areas of Europe.

The Eifel geological structures like main folds and overthrusts can be traced in a southwest–northeast direction far beyond the Rhine valley.

=== Platform ===
Since that folding, the Eifel has largely remained part of the mainland. During the Permian, after the end of the uplifting, the Variscan mountains were heavily eroded, leaving only a relatively flat, truncated upland. For a short time, and only partially, this was later flooded by the sea.

Depositions from the Triassic and Jurassic periods have survived in the so-called Eifel North-South Zone. This is a region of subsidence, which runs from the Trier Bay in the south to the Lower Rhine Bay in the north. Through this zone existed at one time a sea link between north and south Central Europe. The remains of the sediments laid down at this time have survived to a greater extent in the Maubach-Mechernich Triassic Triangle in the north and in the Oberbettingen Triassic Graben in the area around Hillesheim and Oberbettingen.

In the Upper Cretaceous and during the Tertiary, the Eifel was inundated mainly from the north. Remains of Cretaceous rocks were discovered on the High Fens. Scattered patches of Oligocene deposits can be found there and in the Western Eifel.

From the Pliocene onwards, the Rhenish Massif, including the Eifel, experienced an uplift. This led to the streams and rivers cutting into the gently rolling landscape resulting in the present appearance of the low mountain range with its flat plateaus and deeply incised valleys.

Due to numerous recent research projects, climate changes since the last ice age can be traced in detail in the Eifel region.

=== Volcanism ===
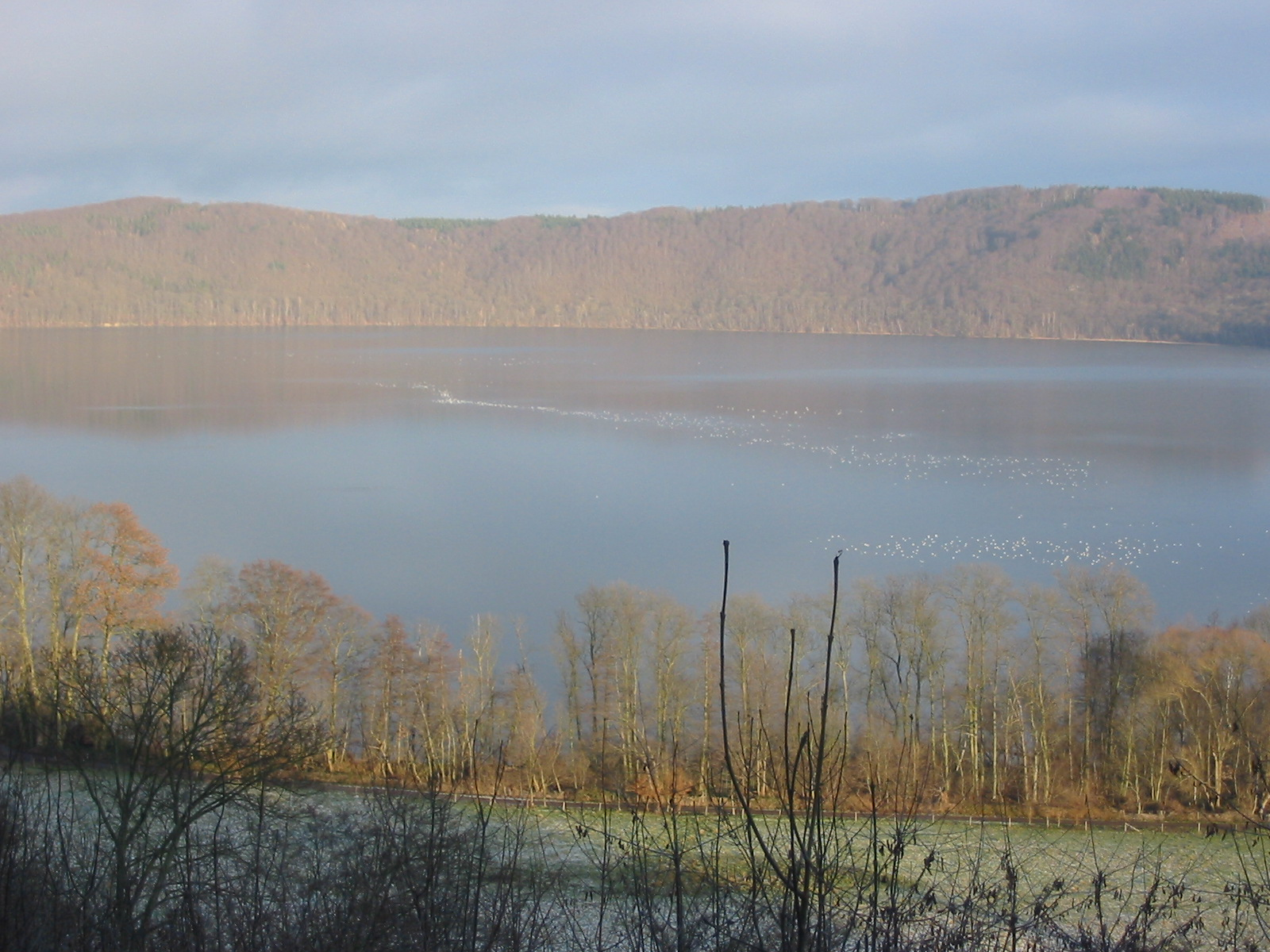
The Laacher See in winter seen from the southwestern shore

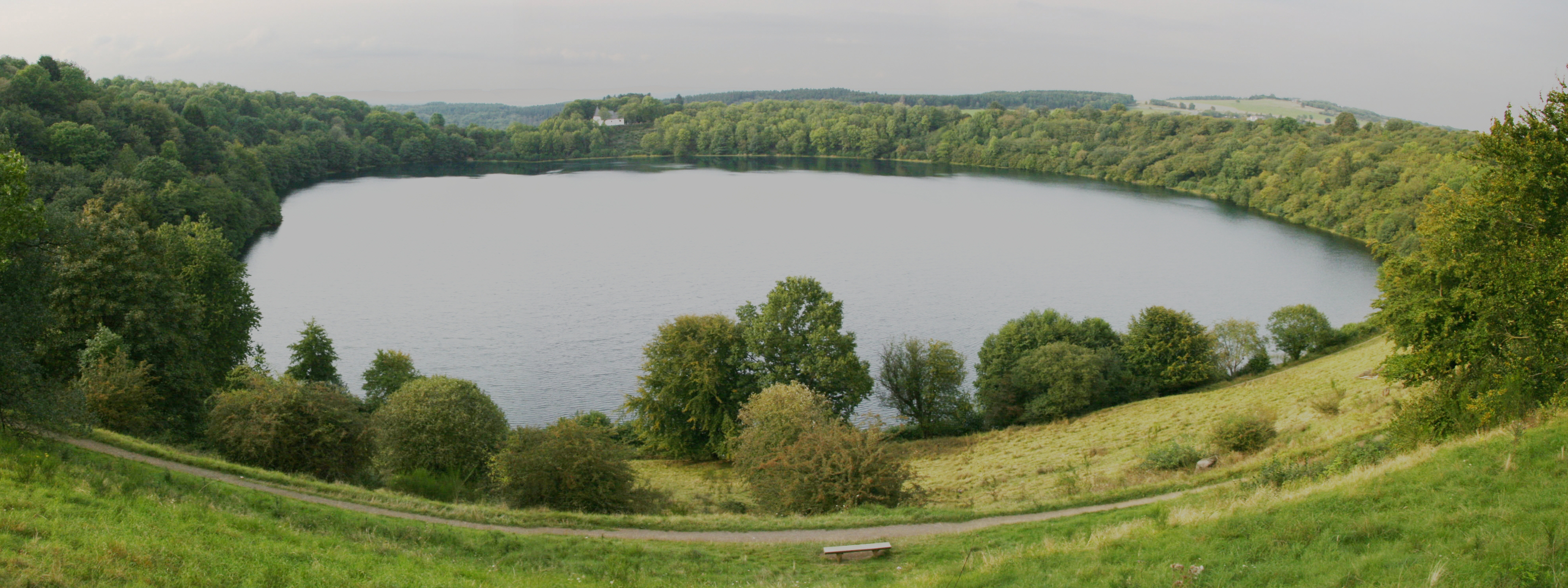
The Weinfelder Maar

Volcanic activity in the Eifel began 50 million years ago and continues into the geological present. It created numerous volcanic structures, lava flows and extensive layers of volcanic ejecta made of tuff and pumice, which have formed the basis of a significant mining activity for the extraction of building materials since Roman times. Some of the hills are volcanic vents. The peculiar circle-shaped lakes (maars) of the volcanic regions formed in volcanic craters.

The first volcanic eruptions took place in the early Tertiary centred in the High Eifel and even before the volcanic activity of the Siebengebirge and Westerwald. Volcanism in the High Eifel came to an end about 15 to 20 million years ago, at the same time as that of the Siebengebirge.

Volcanism in the western and eastern Eifel is, in contrast to that of the High Eifel, much more recent than that of the Siebengebirge and Westerwald. It began in the West Eifel region of Daun, Hillesheim and Gerolstein about 700,000 years ago and created a chain of ash volcanoes, cinder cones, maars and craters running in a chain from northwest to southeast. The youngest maars are only slightly older than 11,000 years.

In the eastern Eifel, volcanism began about 500,000 years ago in the area of today's Laacher See; it extended to the Neuwied Basin to the south, and crossed the Rhine to the east. The quantity of basalt lavas, pumice tuffs and ash tuffs produced by the volcanoes was far greater here than in the western Eifel. East Eifel volcanism came to an end with a huge eruption, as a result of which the magma chamber emptied and collapsed, creating a caldera. Today's Laacher See formed in the caldera. The ashes from the eruption can be detected today in deposits all over Central Europe and as far as Bornholm as a thin layer.

Volcanism is caused by magma, which either rises directly to the Earth's surface from the upper regions of the Earth's mantle or, in the majority of cases, gathers in a magma chamber, several tens of kilometres deep, at the base of the Earth's crust, from which magma rises at irregular intervals and causes volcanic eruptions. Volcanism in the Eifel is thought to be partly caused by the Eifel hotspot, a place where hot material from deep in the mantle rises to the surface, and partly by melt-ascent at deep fractures in the Earth's crust. Research has shown that the volcanism is still active; the Eifel region is rising by 1–2 mm per year and there are escaping gases, for example, carbon dioxide (CO_{2}) in the Laacher See.

== Climate ==
The Eifel is in the Atlantic climate zone with its relatively high precipitation; winters that are moderately cold and long with periods of snow; and summers that are often humid and cool. The prevailing wind is west/southwest. A relatively dry and milder climate prevails in the wind and rain shadow of the High Eifel. Cold air from Siberia in the higher elevations of the Eifel has less of an impact on weather conditions, as the proximity of the Atlantic Ocean to the Eifel brings milder sea air to the Eifel even in winter.

Looking at the long-term averages, even the Snow Eifel only has snow cover for nine consecutive days in winter, as there are no longer lasting cold spells. However, there is an average of 70 days of full snow cover because the frequency of snow at higher elevations is relatively high (for comparison: Bitburg 35 days, Maifeld 30 days), but the level of snowfall varies from year to year. Snow heights vary on average between 15 cm and 60 cm. The humid Atlantic climate can cause extreme variations though: on 2 March 1987 there were 227 cm (89 in) of snow in the Eifel on the Weißer Stein.

The mean temperature in the coldest month (January) is −1.5 °C (29.3 °F) at high elevations, +1.5 to 2 °C (34.7–35.6 °F) in the mountain foreland. There is an average of 110 days of frost, with temperatures below freezing (0 °C; 32 °F) in the highlands and an average of 30 to 40 'ice days' when temperatures do not rise above freezing. The warmest month (July) only has an average temperature of 14 °C (57 °F) in the higher areas. The level of precipitation decreases significantly from west to east as a result of the rain shadow of the highlands. So the Schneifel receives an average of 1,200 mm (47 in) of precipitation (High Fens: 1,400 to 1,500 mm; 55–59 in), while in Maifeld the average rainfall is only 600 mm (24 in).

The bioclimatic conditions in the Eifel are favourable. Heat stress and air humidity are rarely present in summer. The Eifel has a distinctly stimulating climate; the high elevations being considered as highly stimulating. The Eifel is a clean air area with very low air-chemical pollution. On hot sunny days, there is sometimes an increased concentration of ground-level ozone.

Below are two weather station examples for settlements in the Eifel.

Climate data for Nürburg, 485 m asl (1981–2010 normals)
Month	Jan	Feb	Mar	Apr	May	Jun	Jul	Aug	Sep	Oct	Nov	Dec	Year
Record high °C (°F)	13.5 (56.3)	15.6 (60.1)	20.7 (69.3)	25.8 (78.4)	30.4 (86.7)	33.3 (91.9)	34.9 (94.8)	36.0 (96.8)	30.2 (86.4)	25.2 (77.4)	18.8 (65.8)	12.6 (54.7)	36.0 (96.8)
Mean daily maximum °C (°F)	2.6 (36.7)	4.3 (39.7)	7.7 (45.9)	12.3 (54.1)	16.4 (61.5)	19.7 (67.5)	21.6 (70.9)	21.4 (70.5)	17.0 (62.6)	12.5 (54.5)	6.6 (43.9)	2.8 (37.0)	12.2 (54.0)
Daily mean °C (°F)	0.3 (32.5)	1.6 (34.9)	4.2 (39.6)	8.0 (46.4)	11.9 (53.4)	15.0 (59.0)	16.9 (62.4)	16.6 (61.9)	13.0 (55.4)	9.2 (48.6)	4.3 (39.7)	0.6 (33.1)	8.6 (47.5)
Mean daily minimum °C (°F)	−2.1 (28.2)	−1.2 (29.8)	0.7 (33.3)	3.6 (38.5)	7.4 (45.3)	10.1 (50.2)	12.2 (54.0)	11.9 (53.4)	9.0 (48.2)	5.9 (42.6)	2.0 (35.6)	−1.6 (29.1)	4.9 (40.8)
Record low °C (°F)	−18.6 (−1.5)	−17.4 (0.7)	−12.4 (9.7)	−6.4 (20.5)	−1.0 (30.2)	2.1 (35.8)	5.0 (41.0)	3.6 (38.5)	1.1 (34.0)	−5.3 (22.5)	−10.8 (12.6)	−18.1 (−0.6)	−18.6 (−1.5)
Average precipitation mm (inches)	48.0 (1.89)	51.2 (2.02)	50.6 (1.99)	47.4 (1.87)	60.6 (2.39)	53.8 (2.12)	68.9 (2.71)	77.7 (3.06)	57.0 (2.24)	54.1 (2.13)	57.5 (2.26)	51.5 (2.03)	678.3 (26.71)
Average precipitation days	9.5	10.6	10.9	9.4	9.9	9.8	11.4	9.5	9.6	10.5	12.0	10.8	123.9
Mean monthly sunshine hours	56.7	72.1	116.6	166.9	187.0	205.3	204.4	193.3	147.1	105.7	46.5	43.0	1,544.6
Source: Météo Climat

Climate data for Eupen (1981–2010 normals, sunshine 1984–2013)
Month	Jan	Feb	Mar	Apr	May	Jun	Jul	Aug	Sep	Oct	Nov	Dec	Year
Mean daily maximum °C (°F)	3.3 (37.9)	4.4 (39.9)	8.2 (46.8)	12.2 (54.0)	16.3 (61.3)	19.1 (66.4)	21.3 (70.3)	21.0 (69.8)	17.4 (63.3)	12.9 (55.2)	7.2 (45.0)	4.0 (39.2)	12.4 (54.3)
Daily mean °C (°F)	0.8 (33.4)	1.1 (34.0)	4.3 (39.7)	7.4 (45.3)	11.6 (52.9)	14.3 (57.7)	16.5 (61.7)	16.2 (61.2)	12.9 (55.2)	9.2 (48.6)	4.6 (40.3)	1.6 (34.9)	8.4 (47.1)
Mean daily minimum °C (°F)	−1.8 (28.8)	−1.9 (28.6)	0.7 (33.3)	2.8 (37.0)	6.8 (44.2)	9.5 (49.1)	11.7 (53.1)	11.2 (52.2)	8.6 (47.5)	5.8 (42.4)	2.0 (35.6)	−0.8 (30.6)	4.6 (40.3)
Average precipitation mm (inches)	115.0 (4.53)	101.9 (4.01)	106.6 (4.20)	81.5 (3.21)	97.2 (3.83)	101.6 (4.00)	106.7 (4.20)	106.0 (4.17)	105.8 (4.17)	99.3 (3.91)	105.1 (4.14)	120.7 (4.75)	1,247.3 (49.11)
Average precipitation days	15.0	13.3	15.1	12.5	13.2	13.0	13.3	12.5	12.6	12.8	14.8	15.7	163.8
Mean monthly sunshine hours	49	72	111	155	183	175	191	182	130	104	52	37	1,440
Source: Royal Meteorological Institute

== History ==
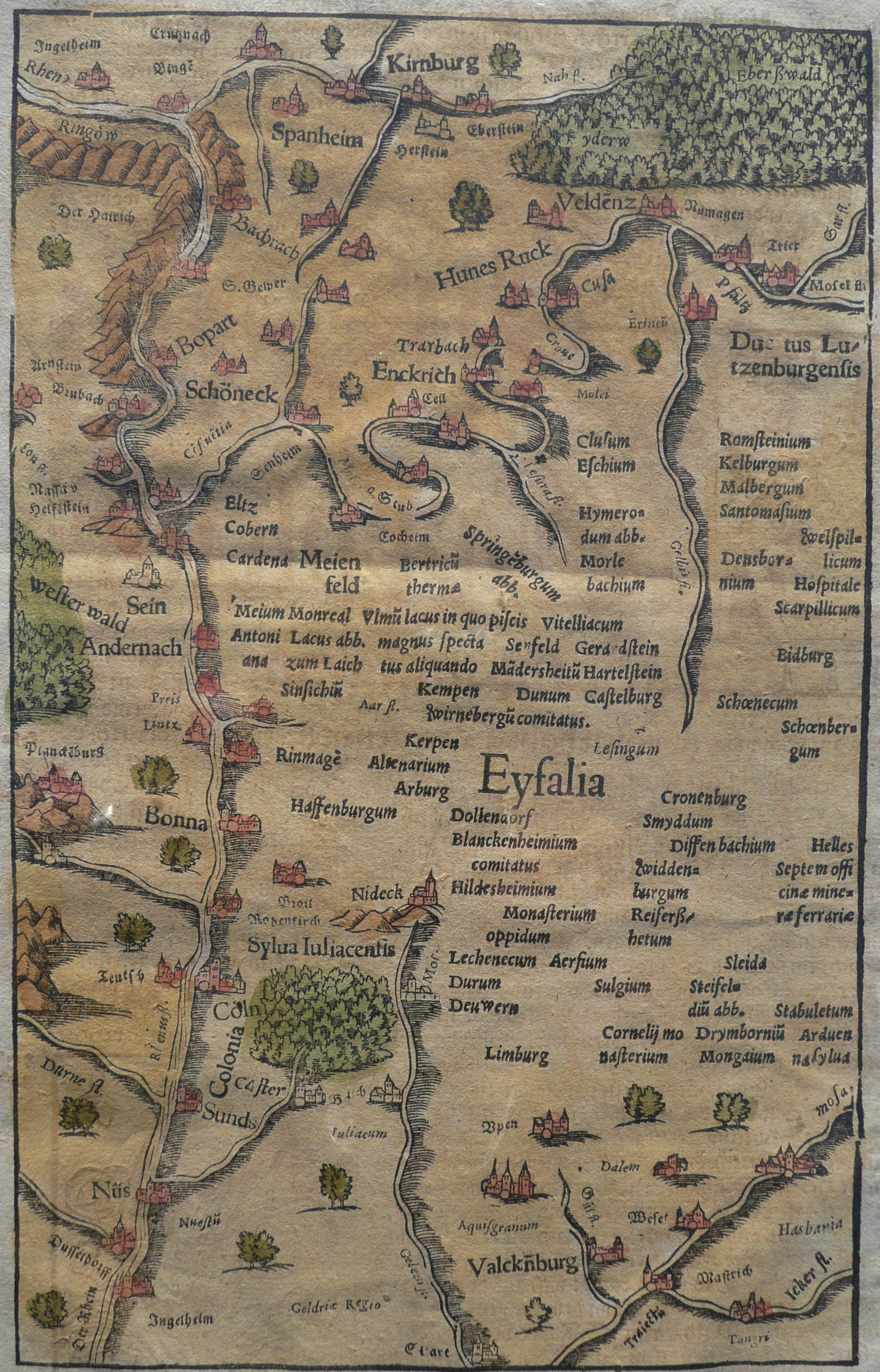
Map of the Eifel (Eyfalia) and adjacent lands in 1628; north is downwards.

=== Etymology ===
==== Usage in the course of history ====
At the time of the Roman Empire the whole mountain range between the rivers Rhine, Meuse and Moselle was called Arduenna silva ("high forest"). The oldest record of the name "Eifel" does not occur until the Early Middle Ages. Following the collapse of the Western Roman Empire, the Frankish Empire emerged in the territories of present-day France and western Germany. This was divided into gaue (Lat.: pagi). One of them, the Eifelgau, covered the source regions of the rivers Erft, Urft, Kyll and Ahr, i.e. predominantly the northern and northwestern foothills of the present Eifel in the eastern half of the Arduenna silva of the Romans. West of the Eifelgau lay the Ardennengau, whose name was derived from Arduenna silva.

Following the end of the Frankish Empire the name of the old gaue continued to be used in popular language. Over the centuries an ever-larger region was referred to as the Eifel. Today the whole German-speaking part of the range between the Rhine, Meuse and Moselle is called the Eifel (including several areas outside of Germany, see the → Belgian Eifel), while the French-speaking part in Belgium and France is called the Ardennes.

==== Earliest surviving records ====
762 Eifflensis pagus, 772 Eiffelnsis pagus, 804 in pago aquilinse, 838 Eifla, 845 Eiflensis pagus, 855 Eiflinsis pagus, 860–886 Agflinse, 975 Aiflensis pagus, 1051 Eiffila, 1105 Eifla, 1121 Eifla

==== Meaning ====
Müller/Schnetz (1937) believe that an -n- has dropped out between the diphthong and the syllable, -fel. The resulting root form Anfil or Anfali would then mean an "area that is not so level". An- would then be a prefix and -fali, which is related to the Slavic polje ("field"), means "plain" or "heath".

W. Kaspers (1938) deduces from the surviving form in pago aquilinse the root form aku-ella, akwella and points to its development into the name "Eifel" in the following sequence: aquila > agfla > aifla > eifla > Eifel. Akuella derives from the pre-German and means "land with summits" or "land with peaks".

Both propositions, like several others, are highly contentious. The most convincing proposal is that of Heinrich Dittmaier (1961). Dittmaier initially derives it from the Germanic Ai-fil. The second component corresponds to Ville, which is the name of a ridge between the Erft, Swist and Rhine today. The variants Vele, Vile and Viele may often be found in place names such as Veler Weg or Veler Pfad. Unlike the modern word Ville the fricative consonant is hard in "Eifel". Responsible for that was probably a sound between ai- and -fil, which was assimilated by the f, possibly f, k, ch, d, t. Dittmaier believes the missing sound was a k or ch, whereby "Eifel" originally went back to Aik-fil. Aik/Aich is also a name for oak (Eiche) and qualifies the root word ville. On the basis that it was covered by oak trees, the Eifel (= Eich-Ville) could thus be distinguished from the other Ville, a name still used today, on the Erft. However, the original, historical and even current vegetation of the present day Ville is dominated by oak mixed forest.

The meaning of "Ville" is also disputed. Dittmaier gives three possible explanations: "marshy region", "plain, heath" and "heathland", which would all bring geology and vegetation into harmony.

Another proposal sees the name as even older and possibly of Celtic origin. Near Cologne, an altar was found, which was dedicated to Matronae Aufaniae Celtic goddesses which were honoured by flowing water. The thesis that the name "Eifel" was derived from this source is not conclusive, but it is persuasive; Eifel would then mean "land of water" or "watery mountains".

=== Settlement history ===
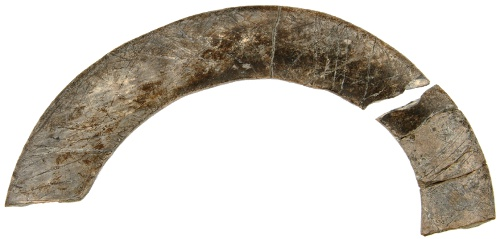
Ivory artifacts from the Magdalena Cave

By the Old Stone Age, the Eifel was inhabited by people: Neanderthals and modern humans. This is evinced by the Buchenloch and Magdalena Caves near Gerolstein. The artifacts from the Magdalena Cave also show that the Eifel was visited by humans even during the height of the last ice age.

Excavations show that iron was already being worked by the Iron Age "Hunsrück-Eifel culture" to which the Eifel gives its name. The first smelting hut north of the Alps was built during the La Tène period in the 5th century BC in Hillesheim. Near Bitburg there is an iron smelting site in which metal was smelted and worked in an almost industrial manner during the Roman period. In Roman times, the Eifel was an important economic region. Its mineral resources (lead, zinc spar, iron, limestone and stones for construction) were mined, and trade benefited from long-distance Roman communication routes such as the Roman road from Trier to Cologne, which crossed the Eifel.

In the late Middle Ages, the Eifel was a border area between the Archbishoprics of Electoral Cologne and Electoral Trier, the County of Luxembourg and the Duchy of Jülich. This explains the large number of castles, now lying in ruins, which had been built mainly for the purpose of guarding the border. Through skillful politics, several smaller principalities and abbey estates were able to acquire their independence, for example the House of Manderscheid-Blankenheim, the County of Salm-Reifferscheid and Prüm Abbey.

The mining and smelting works, with their demand for pit props and charcoal for smelting, the great demand for construction timber and firewood and the shipbuilding industry which was widespread until the 19th century, led to an almost complete deforestation of the woods. In fact, around 1800, the Eifel must be imagined as a landscape of meadows and heathland, where animals, especially flocks of sheep, grazed. At the same time, the population was becoming increasingly impoverished because the poor arable land did not yield rich harvests. Even after the decline of mining and smelting operations after the mid-19th century, the situation of the population did not improve. In addition, the Eifel was a marching route for French troops to all kinds of theatres of war. They demanded "forage money" from the local population, which just caused further impoverishment, as the records of Kottenheim show.

Prussian rule began in 1815, but little changed in terms of social conditions: The Eifel, as a poor peripheral region of the empire ("Prussian Siberia"), was only of interest for military reasons. For Prussian officials and officers, mainly Protestants, a posting to the purely Catholic Eifel region was like a punishment sentence. However, the landscape changed as Prussia carried out systematic reforestation, albeit with coniferous trees that were not typical of the region.

In the 19th century, the Eifel region suffered severe famines, especially in 1816/17, 1847 and 1879/80, and an 1853 memorandum records that "Many Eifel inhabitants know no food other than potatoes and bread that consists of a mixture of oatmeal and potato. It can be said without exaggeration that two thirds of the entire population only enjoy meat once a year." The consequences of the terrible food situation were only too obvious: "In 1852, only 10% of all those liable to enlistment were fit for military service."."

Due to its barren soils and the harsh climate, which led time and again to poor harvests, many farmers were in debt. According to reports of the winter of starvation in 1879/80, however, there was a wave of solidarity in the Reich, and in 1883 the "Eifel Fund" was established, through which, within 18 years, 5.5 millions Reichsmarks were raised for land improvement, for the afforestation of barren land and for land consolidation.

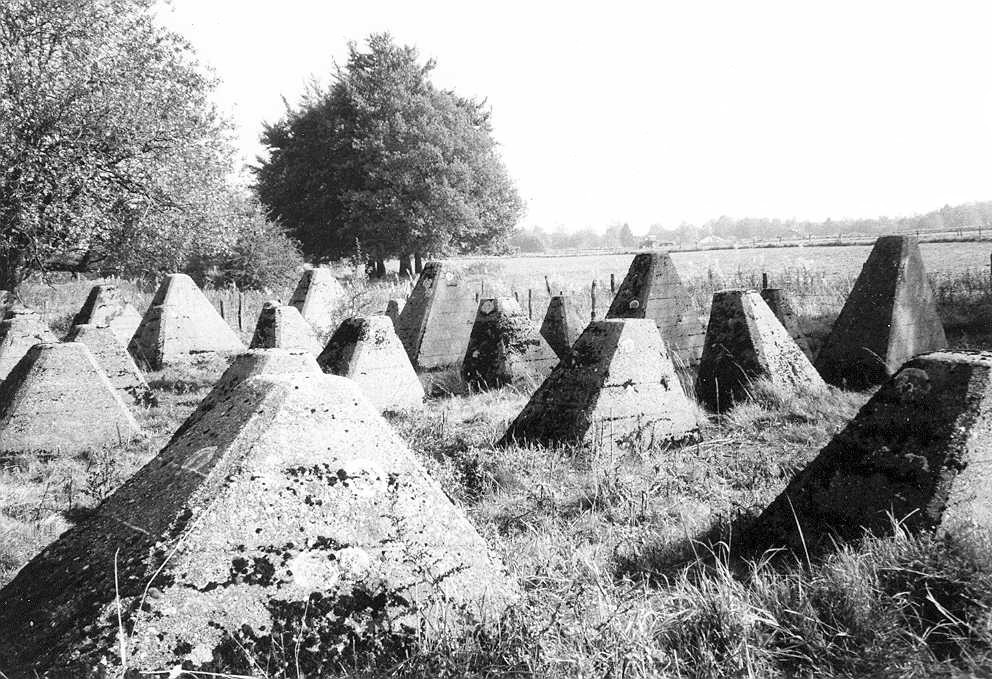
Siegfried Line anti-tank barriers in the Eifel

For a long time, economic development was hampered by the poor condition of roads and tracks. However, due to its border location between the German Empire, Belgium and Luxembourg (as march routes to France), many railway lines were built since the foundation of the German Empire, which served military-strategic purposes. This improvement of the transport routes also boosted tourism. The construction of the Nürburgring also served the purpose of economic development in the 1920s.

The border region of the Eifel was also not spared by the Second World War. The construction of the Siegfried Line was followed, from September 1944 to January 1945, by violent battles and the Ardennes Offensive, especially in the northern Eifel, which still bears witness to the legacy of the war: ruins of old bunkers and parts of tank barriers. Especially in the Battle of the Hürtgen Forest, where the battle with the highest losses was fought in the west, military cemeteries - such as in Vossenack - bear witness to the brutal events of the war.

The Eifel region was severely hit in the 2021 European floods.

== Economy ==
Much of the Eifel has limited infrastructure and there are almost no large industrial areas. Only in the Pellenz in the Neuwied Basin is there a stronger industrial presence. Agriculture is restricted to certain valleys and the lower levels (particularly in parts of the southern Eifel, the Pre-Eifel and the Maifeld). A large number of farms have been converted into stabling facilities, some of which offer overnight accommodation and horse care for trail riders.

Wine-growing is a major activity along the Rhine, Moselle and Ahr valleys and in the Wittlich Basin. In the Wittlich Basin, tobacco is also grown. At Holsthum in the Prüm valley, in the lee of the Ferschweiler Plateau, hops are grown for the Bitburger Brewery. However, at high altitudes in the Eifel, only forestry and dairy farming are generally possible.

Mining is still carried out in the Eifel region. In Mayen the firm of Rathscheck Schiefer mines roofing slates in the Moselle slate mines of Katzenberg and Margareta, and gypsum in Ralingen on the River Sauer near the border with Luxembourg. In the South Eifel, especially in the Wehrer Bowl, volcanic carbonic acid is extracted.

In many places in the Eifel region, the mining of pumice, basalt and other rocks and minerals has a long tradition. For example, between Daun, Gerolstein and Hillesheim – i.e. in the heart of the Volcanic Eifel – there are 17 active pits over an area of 11 by 12 km (6.8 by 7.5 mi). Residents and local authorities affected by the planned expansion (as of July 2012) have practically no influence over it because it is based on the old mining law.

There is evidence that iron was being processed in the Eifel by the Iron Age. The first smelting works north of the Alps was built during the La Tène period in the 5th century BC in Hillesheim. Near Bitburg there is an iron smeltery where, during the Roman period, the metal was being smelted and worked almost in an industrial way. So by then the Eifel was already an important economic area. Its mineral resources (lead, zinc spar, iron, lime and rocks for construction) were mined and trade benefited from Roman roads such as the Roman road from Trier to Cologne, which crossed the Eifel.

The abundance of timber, which was needed for smelting, and of watercourses, which were indispensable for the preparation and operation of hammer mills and bellows, made it possible for the Eifel to be an important supra-regional economic area even in the late Middle Ages. About 10% of the iron produced in Europe originated from the Eifel. It was traded at the markets in Trier and Cologne.

Well known are the many mineral springs, which occur frequently here because of the region's volcanic past. The largest bottlers are Gerolsteiner Brunnen and Apollinaris. One of the largest German breweries, Bitburger, has its headquarters and production facilities in Bitburg in the Eifel.

The economic importance of tourism has increased since the Second World War; and it was further encouraged, for example, by the Eifel's designation as a national park (the Eifel National Park) on 1 January 2004, as well as the natural history infrastructure in the Volcanic Eifel. Furthermore, the Eifel Park and several maars and lakes are popular tourist destinations. In winter, in some of the highlands, there are opportunities for winter sports, e.g. at the Schwarzer Mann near Prüm, the Weißer Stein near Hellenthal or in Rohren near Monschau. A well known destination for motorsport fans is the Nürburgring with its famous Nordschleife. Another touristic and geological destination is the German Volcano Road, which links the attractions of the Vulkanland Eifel Geopark. There are also numerous mountains and hills with good viewing points as well as several holiday routes. Hiking tourism is also of considerable economic importance, as is reflected in the increasing number of overnight stays for hiking guests and the progressive expansion of the network of trails. In addition to the Eifelsteig trail, which was opened in 2009 and runs from Aachen to Trier across the Eifel, there is a wide network of themed and circular walks.

== Culture ==
=== Literature ===
As a traditionally isolated land, in which the population kept a quiet and simple way of life, the Eifel offered fertile soil for lively folk poetry. The sagas, legends and fairy tales, which were told on long winter evenings in the farmhouse parlours, often reflect a longing for a better world, which stood in contrast to the found reality of life. The Eifel also repeatedly offered material for numerous literary and regional studies works - from the Eifel and about the Eifel.

==== Folk literature ====
Eifel mentality and humour were reflected in numerous anecdotes and jokes. Figures of fun and Eifel characters are brought to life in these stories. The Dahnener Sprünge have become famous beyond the region. A love of jokes and ridicule of one's neighbours may have formed motives for these popular stories of Eifel fools. In addition, there are countless horror stories of witches, undead, headless riders, revenants and werewolves, which – like those in the neighbouring Ardennes region – survived into the 20th century.

Folk poetry of the Eifel was collected early on. Inspired by Romanticism, in which folklore was seen as a rich source of unadulterated motifs and forms, collections of stories and adaptations of Eifel folk tales emerged. Among the most illuminating collections is the poetic guide through the Eifel region by chaplain, Johann Heydinger. Prominent authors such as Adelbert von Chamisso, Guido Görres, Karl Simrock, Ernst Moritz Arndt and Friedrich Schlegel rank amongst the early Eifel authors.

During the 1920s scientific interest in folk culture also gave impetus to the collection of folk poetry. The most prominent collector was Bonn professor of folklore, Matthias Zender, who was born in Zendscheid and who, as a student between 1929 and 1936, collected about 10,000 stories, folk tales and jokes from the Eifel/Ardennes region, of which 2,000 were published.

Scary stories from the Eifel region were collected and partly published by headmaster, Heinrich Hoffmann, from Düren in 1900 and also by Zender in the 1930s. Peter Kremer published a collection of such stories with a commentary in 2003 in a Düren publication.

==== Authors and works ====
Well-known historical works of the Eifel are the Eiflia illustrata oder geographische und historische Beschreibung der Eifel by Johann Friedrich Schannat, published in the 17th century, translated, supplemented and re-edited in 1824 by Georg Bärsch; and the Eiflia sacra, also edited by Schannat and re-edited in 1888 by Carl Schorn.

The first recognised Eifel poet was Peter Zirbes, a wandering stoneware trader from Niederkail. He was the author of simple poems in the Eifel dialect, which he published in 1852. In 2010, Ute Bales wrote a novel about his life, which was awarded the special prize by the jury in the Rhineland-Palatinate Book of the Year competition (Buch des Jahres Rheinland-Pfalz). Many contemporary poets who live in the Eifel or come from the Eifel have captured the Eifel poetically and made it known beyond its borders to readers of poetry in the German-speaking world. These include Jochen Arlt (who has also contributed to regional literature as the editor of several Eifel anthologies), Theo Breuer, Ursula Krechel and Norbert Scheuer. Jochen Arlt's poem Einkaufn gehen in Münstereifel may be read in the most important German poetry collection, The Great Conrady. The book of German poems. From its Beginnings to the Present.

One great narrator and native of Trier, who chose the Eifel as the setting for her novels and stories, was Clara Viebig. The best-selling author of the subsequent naturalism movement, wrote two great literary monuments about the Eifel with her novels, Kreuz im Venn and Weiberdorf. The reception of Clara Viebig's work was interrupted during the Nazi era because of her marriage to a Jewish publisher. Since the end of the 1980s, the author's works have experience a deserved renaissance - even in the Eifel region. Perhaps the most important literary work about the Eifel region and its people is the novel Winterspelt by Alfred Andersch, which is set in the final phase of the Second World War and depicts the positional war during the Ardennes offensive and the tragic combination of people and their fates in epic breadth. The author, Heinz Küpper, who died in 2005 and whose novels included Wohin mit dem Kopf and Zweikampf mit Rotwild, Norbert Scheuer from Kall and Ute Bales from Gerolstein are today the most important representatives of the Eifel in the field of contemporary, German-language prose. In their works, they present the Eifel, both physically and symbolically, as a rugged landscape, which becomes a reflection of spiritual landscapes. Particularly interesting here (in comparison to the perspective of the more down-to-earth narrator) is the Eifel's literary composition from the point of view of the outsider.

This literature challenges us to confront the region and its people, especially where there is no attempt to romanticize the Eifel, but where hopelessness and despair in the face of poverty and misery, intellectual narrowness or rigid systems of values become apparent. Although Norbert Scheuer was born in the Eifel, the narrators of his novels and stories take the perspective of the distanced or the outsider. Norbert Scheuer has succeeded in presenting life in the Eifel in a multifaceted way and making it interesting for readers in the entire German-speaking area, especially in his latest book Kall, Eifel (2005). In Ute Bales' novels, landscape and people are inseparably connected. The characteristic of the Eifel landscape and its inhabitants is the starting point of a narrative style that shows people as "lonely, lost, in a misunderstood place" in and with their suffering, as in the novel Kamillenblumen (2010) about the peddler, Traud, from Kolverath.

==== Eifel crime novels ====
One literary genre that has been flourishing in many regions and cities in Germany over the last few decades is the crime novel with a local or regional setting. Jacques Berndorf has become the best-selling German crime novelist with detective novels such as Eifel-Blues (1989), Eifel-Sturm (1999) or Eifel-Träume (2004). In 1996, he was awarded the top prize at the Eifel Literature Festival. In addition, Ralf Kramp was awarded the sponsorship prize. Kramp was the first author to write Eifel crime stories for children with his series about the "black cloverleaf" (schwarzes Kleeblatt). Harald Schneider (born 1962) is the author of the children's detective series Die Meisterschnüffler, an interactive read that leads readers from 8 years old to different locations in the Eifel. Carola Clasen, Carsten Sebastian Henn, Andreas Izquierdo, Rudolf Jagusch, Martina Kempff, Elke Pistor, Edgar Noske and Hans Jürgen Sittig are other authors who contribute to the genre of Eifel crime novels. Historical crime novels have been penned by Günter Krieger and Petra Schier. Josef Zierden has published an Eifel thriller travel guide that covers countless crime novel scenes in the Eifel. In the town of Hillesheim there is an Eifel crime novel hiking trail that links the scenes of novels by Jacques Berndorf and Ralf Kramp. The crime novel house in Hillesheim houses the largest collection of detective novels in the German-speaking world with a stock of 30,000 books, and there is also a "crime café" in the house.

=== Fine arts ===
The Eifel was a destination for German impressionists, among them Eugen Bracht, who painted there with colleagues, and August von Brandis, who often spent several days there with architecture students from Aachen in order to give them an understanding of landscape painting. Two of Bracht's paintings are preserved at the castles of Manderscheid.

== Towns and cities ==
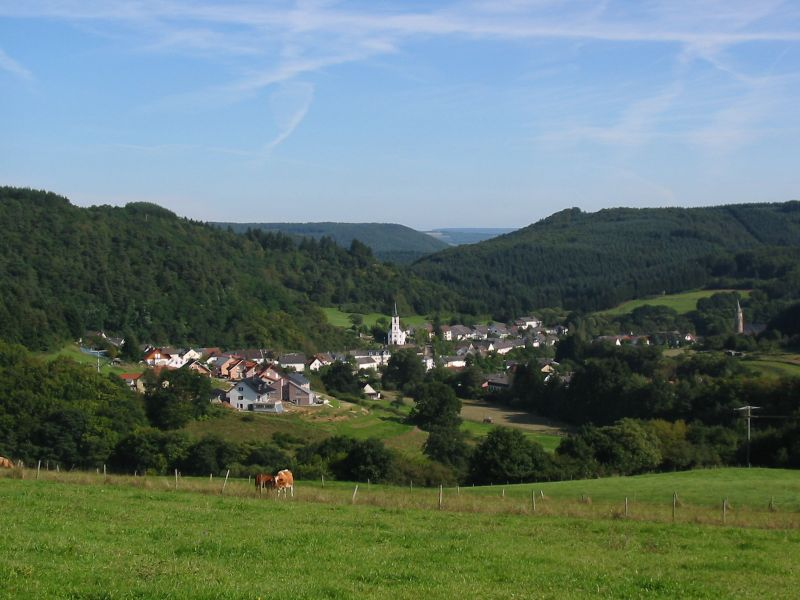
The village of Bruch in the South Eifel

- Towns in the Eifel: Adenau, Bad Münstereifel, Bad Neuenahr-Ahrweiler, Bitburg, Daun, Eupen (Belgium), Gerolstein, Gulpen (Netherlands), Heimbach, Hillesheim, Kaisersesch, Kyllburg, Malmedy (Belgium), Manderscheid, Mayen, Mechelen (Netherlands), Mechernich, Mendig, Monschau, Münstermaifeld, Neuerburg, Nideggen, Polch, Prüm, Schleiden, St. Vith (Belgium), Speicher, Stolberg, Ulmen, Vijlen (Netherlands), Wittlich.
- Towns and cities near the Eifel: Aachen, Bonn, Düren, Düsseldorf, Euskirchen, Koblenz, Cologne, Liège (Belgium), Luxembourg (Luxembourg), Maastricht (Netherlands), Trier.

== Castles ==
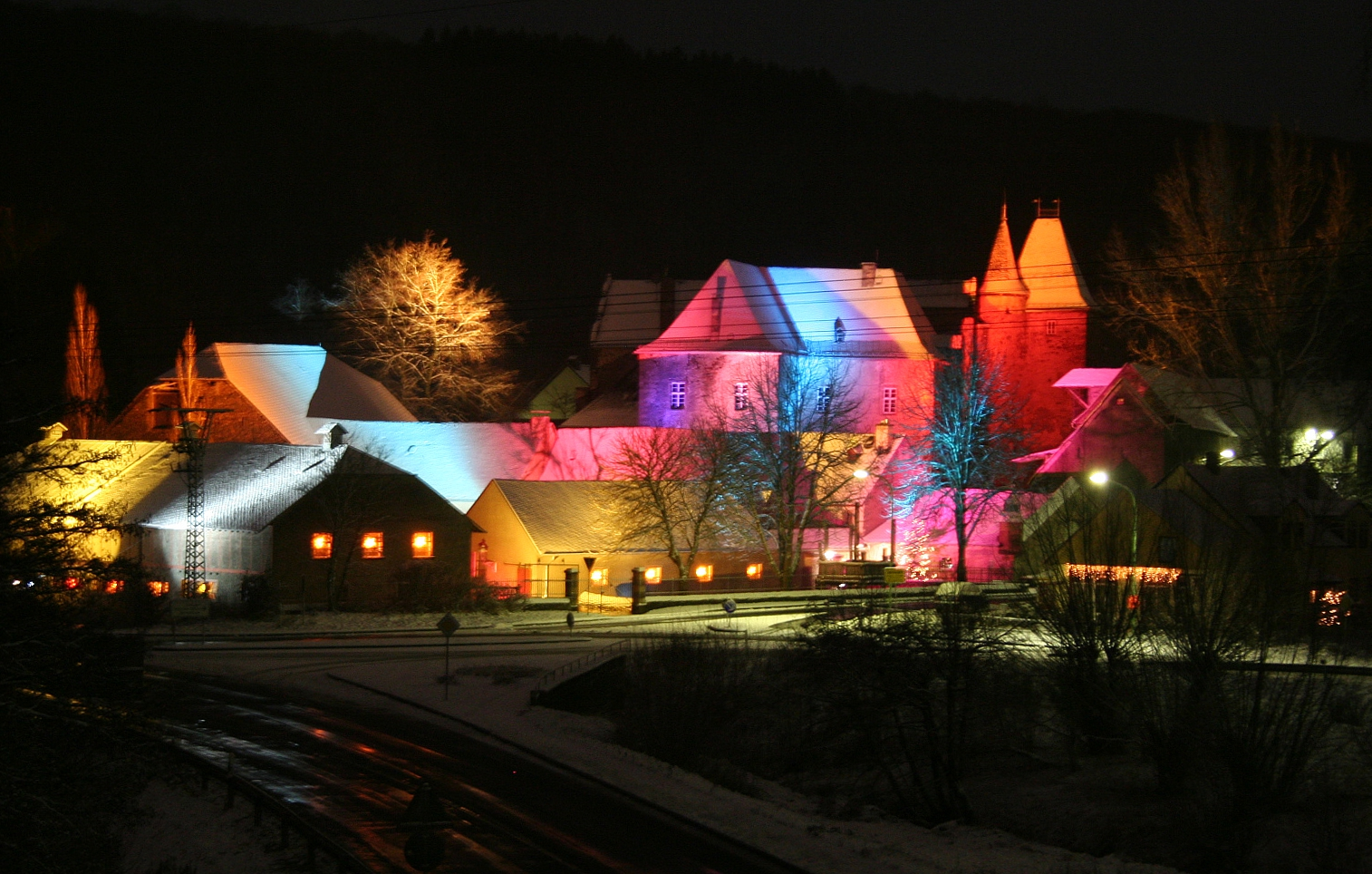
Lissingen Castle

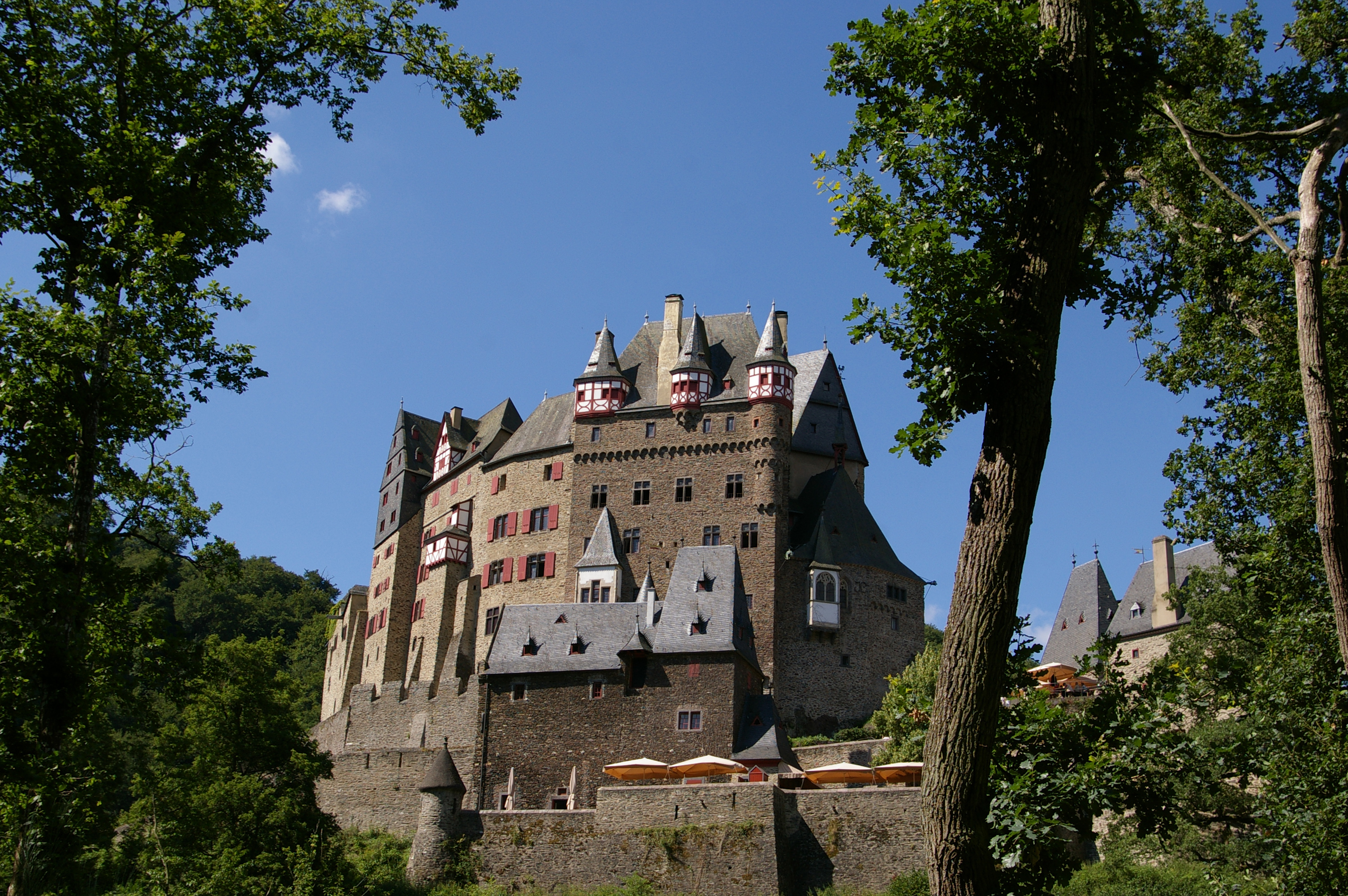
Eltz Castle

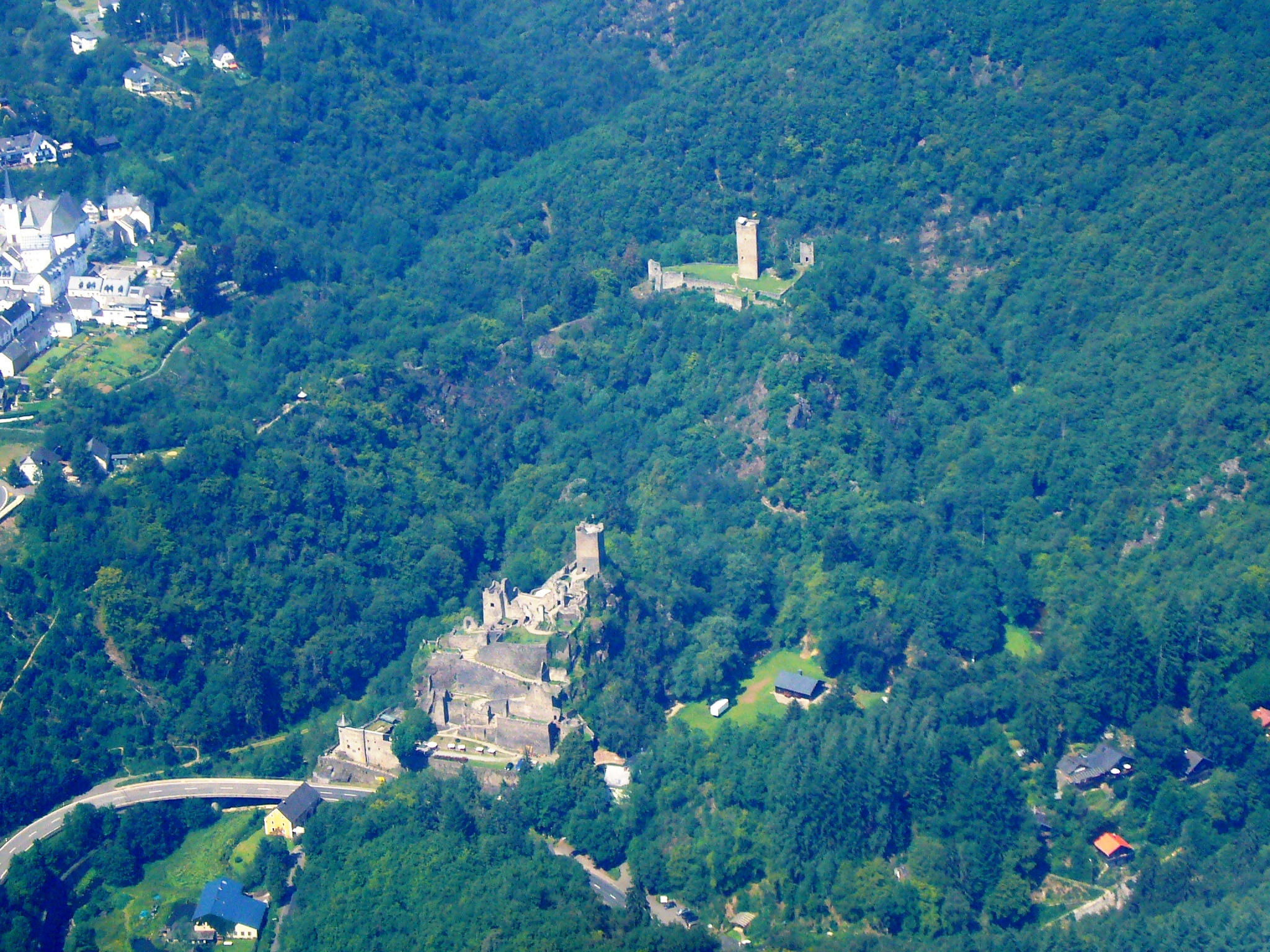
Manderscheid castles

=== Well preserved ===
- Eltz Castle
- Lissingen Castle
- Satzvey Castle
- Dudeldorf Castle
- Schloss Eicks

=== 19th- and 20th-century rebuilds ===
- Bollendorf Castle
- Genovevaburg
- Vlatten Castle
- Cochem Castle

=== Ruins ===
- Gerolstein Castle
- Gödersheim Castle
- Löwenburg and Philippsburg
- Manderscheid castles
- Monschau Castle
- Nideggen Castle
- Schönecken Castle
- Ulmen castles
- Nürburg Castle

== Transport ==
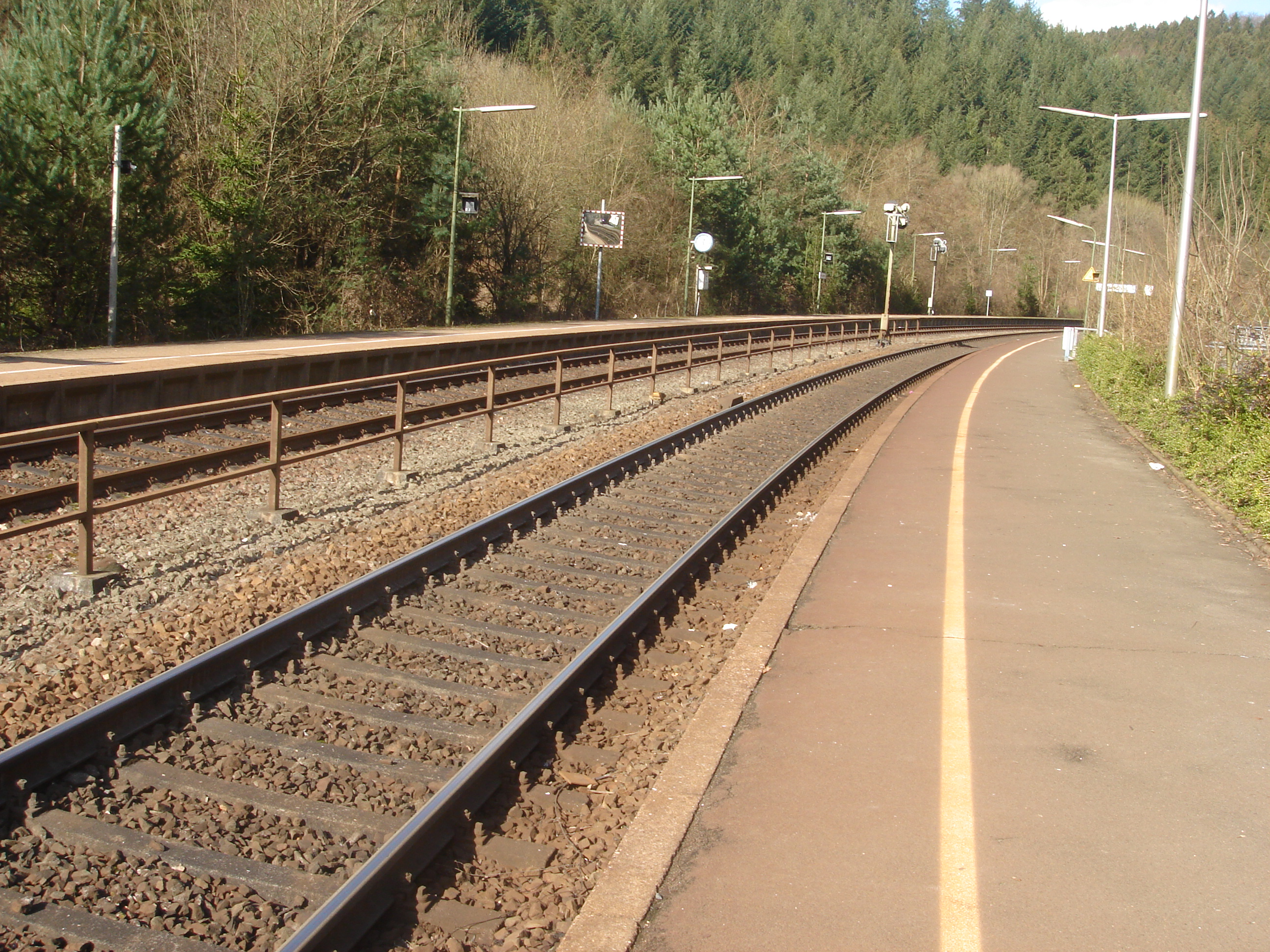
The Eifel Line (near the station of Speicher)

Through the Eifel run the following transport routes:

- the Ahr Valley Railway from Remagen to Ahrbrück
- the Eifel Line from Cologne via Euskirchen, Kall and Gerolstein to Trier and several branch lines. Most of the branch lines have however since been closed and some have been lifted.
- the Erft Valley Railway from Euskirchen to Bad Münstereifel with its connexion to the Voreifel Railway from Euskirchen to Bonn
- the Trans-Eifel Railway from Andernach via Mayen, Kaisersesch and Daun to Gerolstein. The section of line from Kaisersesch to Gerolstein is only operated in spring and summer. The branching lines from Mayen via Polch to Koblenz, Polch to Münstermaifeld and Daun to Wittlich were closed and partly converted for tourist purposes (cycleways).
- the Rur Valley Railway from Düren to Heimbach. It is additionally worked on summer weekends by the Euregio Railway on the section from Heerlen (Netherlands) via Aachen and Düren to Heimbach and is especially popular with day tourists, for whom the town of Heimbach and its associated villages are a charming destination.
- the Brohl Valley Railway from Brohl to Engeln; privately operated narrow gauge railway.
- the A 1 (also Eifel Motorway), A 48, A 60, A 61, A 64, A 565, A 571 and A 573 motorways.
- numerous federal roads, e. g. the B 49, B 50, B 51, B 52, B 53, B 56, B 257, B 258, B 265, B 399, B 409, B 410, B 418, B 421 and B 477

== Points of interest ==
- The Nürburgring, one of the world's most famous motor-racing courses. The northern loop (Nordschleife) of the course is known as the Green Hell (Grüne Hölle), because of its long, difficult and dangerous course through the local forest. The 2020 Formula One World Championship held a race at the Nürburgring under the title of Eifel Grand Prix.
- The Eifel Aqueduct, an interesting archeological feature. One of the longest aqueducts of the Roman Empire, it provided water to the Roman settlement of Colonia Claudia Ara Agrippinensium (modern-day Cologne).

== See also ==
- Eifelian
- Eifel Club
- List of mountains and hills of the Eifel
- Eifeler Regel
- High Eifel
- North Eifel
- South Eifel
- West Eifel
- Belgian Eifel
- Rur Eifel
- Schnee Eifel
- Volcanic Eifel
