= Richelsley =

Rock formation in Liège Province, Belgium

Coordinates: 50.535935°N 6.191225°E

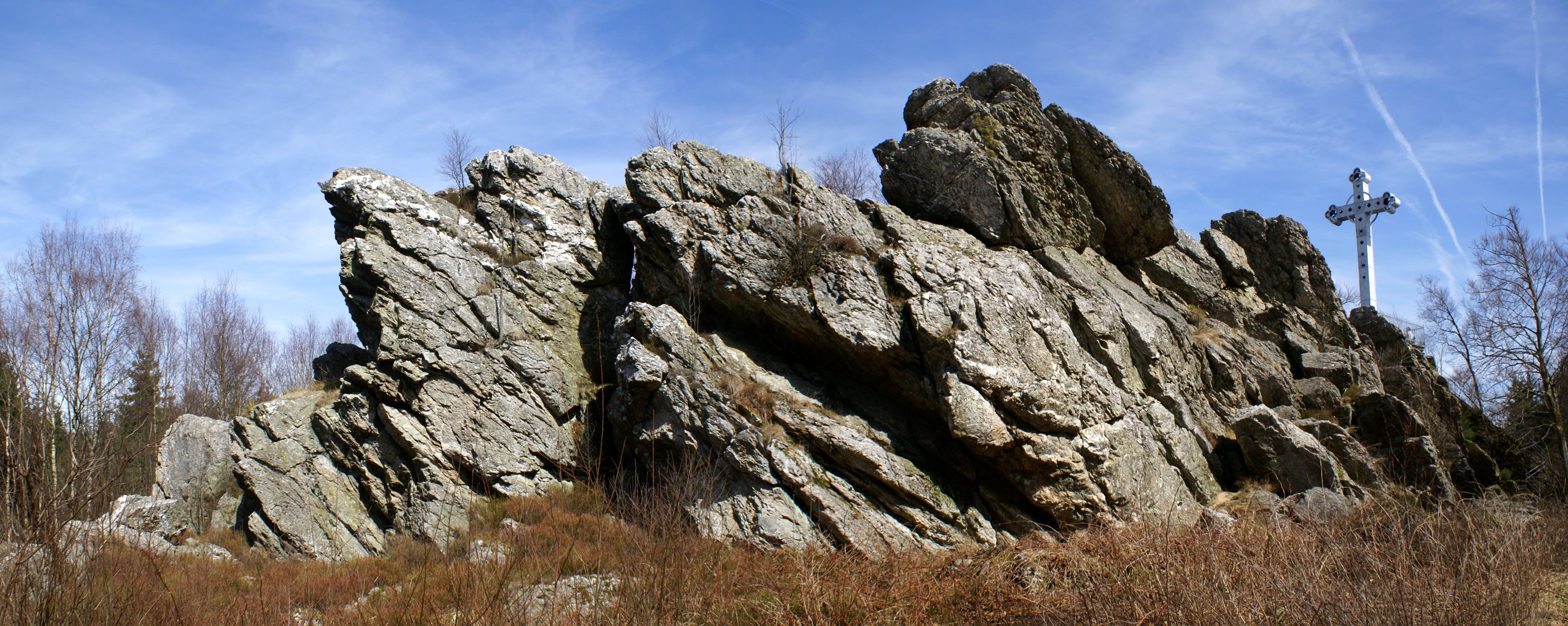

The Richelsley, also written Richel Ley, is an 80-metre-long and up to 12-metre-high rock formation on the edge of the High Fens, part of the Eifel Mountains, in Belgium. It bears a large cross and is a well-known pilgrimage site. Ley is a German word for "crag" or "rock".

== Name ==
The name is supposed to have been given to it in the 12th century by Richwin, the founder of Richwinstein Castle, today Reichenstein Abbey.

== Geography ==
=== Location ===
The Richelsley is located in Belgium's Wallonia region, in the Liège Province multi-language municipality of Waimes, close to the German border near Reichenstein/Monschau Abbey.

=== Geology ===
The rock formation is a Devonian conglomerate, formed over 400 million years ago. It is incorrectly described in various documents as a megalith. It is however made of sedimentary rock that contains quartz, whose present shape and extent are a result of the natural erosion of the surrounding sediment.

== History ==
The cross was erected in 1890 by the priest, Gerhard Joseph Arnoldy, who worked from 1869 to 1914 in Kalterherberg and was the builder of the present Eifel Cathedral. He had it built at his own expense for 800 gold marks to commemorate the monk, Stephan Horrichem. Horrichem, known as the "Apostle of the Fens", was the prior of the nearby Premonstratensian abbey of Reichenstein from 1639 to 1686 and worked tirelessly for the people of the High Fens who were endangered during the Thirty Years' War.

The novel Das Kreuz im Venn (The Cross in the Fens) by Clara Viebig, appeared around 1908, made the Richelsley, which lies in the middle of woods, and its cross well known beyond the Eifel mountain region in which they are found.

== Cross ==
The Richelsey has become well known not least because of the great 6-metre (20 ft)-high cross, weighing roughly 1.4 tonnes (1,400 kg), which is anchored in the rock on the Richelsley. 31 steps lead up to the cross, into which cross-shaped ornaments are cut.

== Pilgrimage site ==
The Richelsley, at the statue of St. Mary in a niche on the huge rock, is a popular place of prayer. Burning candles and fresh flowers bear witness to the many pilgrims who make their way today to the Richelsley and find encouragement and renewal in the stillness, peace and solace of the place. For decades pilgrims have taken part in processions on 1 May from the surrounding villages to St. Mary's Grotto in order to celebrate the May service.
