= Raßberg =

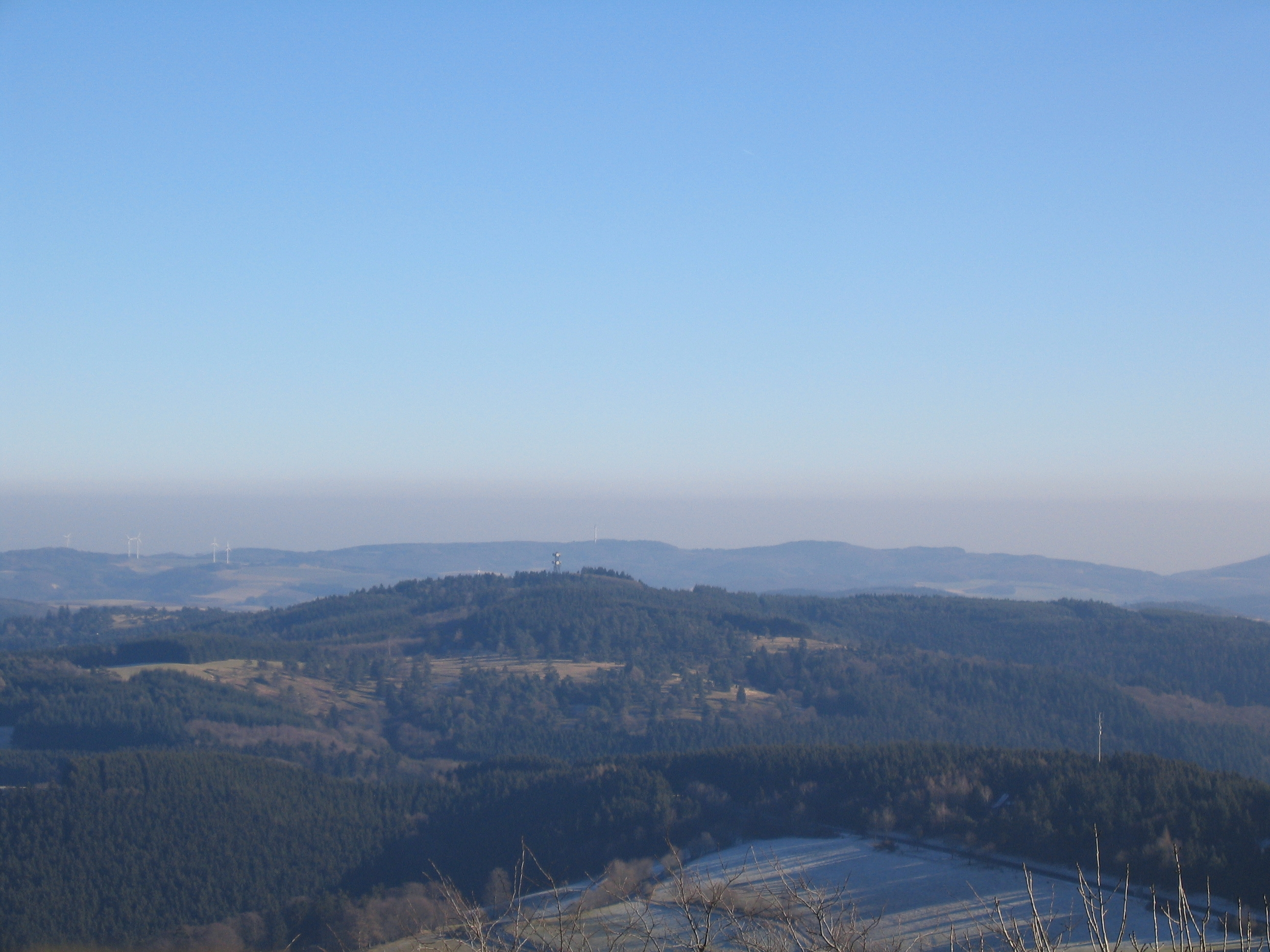
- The Raßberg seen from the Hohe Acht

Highest point
- Elevation: 668 m above sea level (NN) (2,192 ft)
- Coordinates: 50°23′21″N 7°03′45″E

Geography
- Location within Rhineland-Palatinate
- Location: Rheinland-Pfalz, Germany
- Parent range: Eifel

At 668 m above sea level (NN) the Raßberg is one of the highest mountains in the Eifel region on the German and Belgian border. It lies within the municipality of Arft in the collective municipality of Vordereifel within sight of the Eifel's highest peak, the Hohe Acht.

== Walking ==
Walkers and naturalists are drawn to its juniper heaths. It is accessible to the public via the Juniper Trail (Wacholderwanderweg), which runs for 15 km through the protected juniper reserve of the East Eifel.

== History ==
There are good views from its largely unforested plateau, on which there is a US steel lattice mast. This was the previous location of Arft Radio Relay station (AFCC designation Adenau) maintained by the Air Force Communications Command now Air Force Network Integration Center and United States Air Force Europe USAFE. Arft was an unmanned microwave relay station linking the 2139th Communication Squadron at Prum Air Station and various points in Germany.
