= Herkelstein =

Hill in Mechernich, North Rhine-Westphalia, Germany

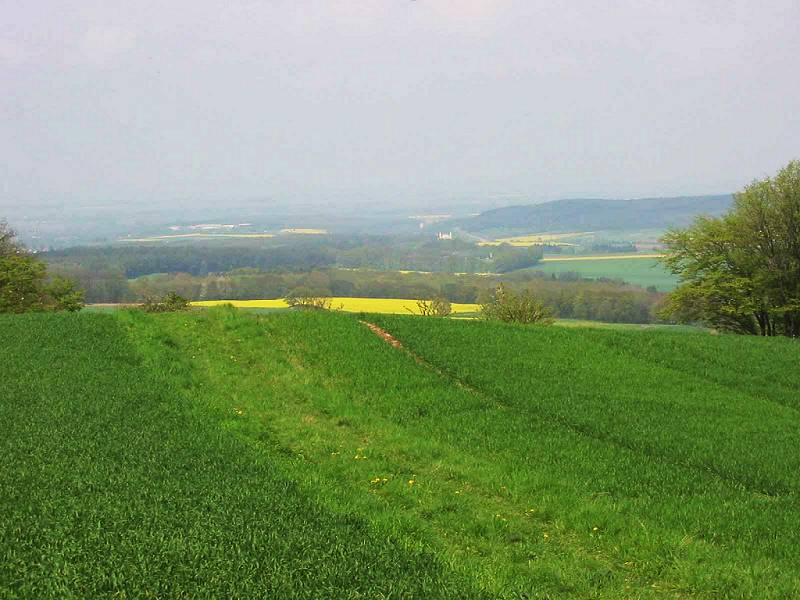
- View of the Cologne Bay from the Herkelstein

Highest point
- Elevation: 434.5 m above sea level (NHN) (1,426 ft)
- Coordinates: 50°34′24″N 6°42′15″E

Geography
- Location within North Rhine-Westphalia
- Location: North Rhine-Westpalia, Germany
- Parent range: Eschweiler Ridge

The Herkelstein is a hill located in the town of Mechernich, North Rhine-Westphalia, Germany. Its highest point is 1,426ft above sea level.
