= Schloss Eicks =

- Part of Mechernich
- Germany
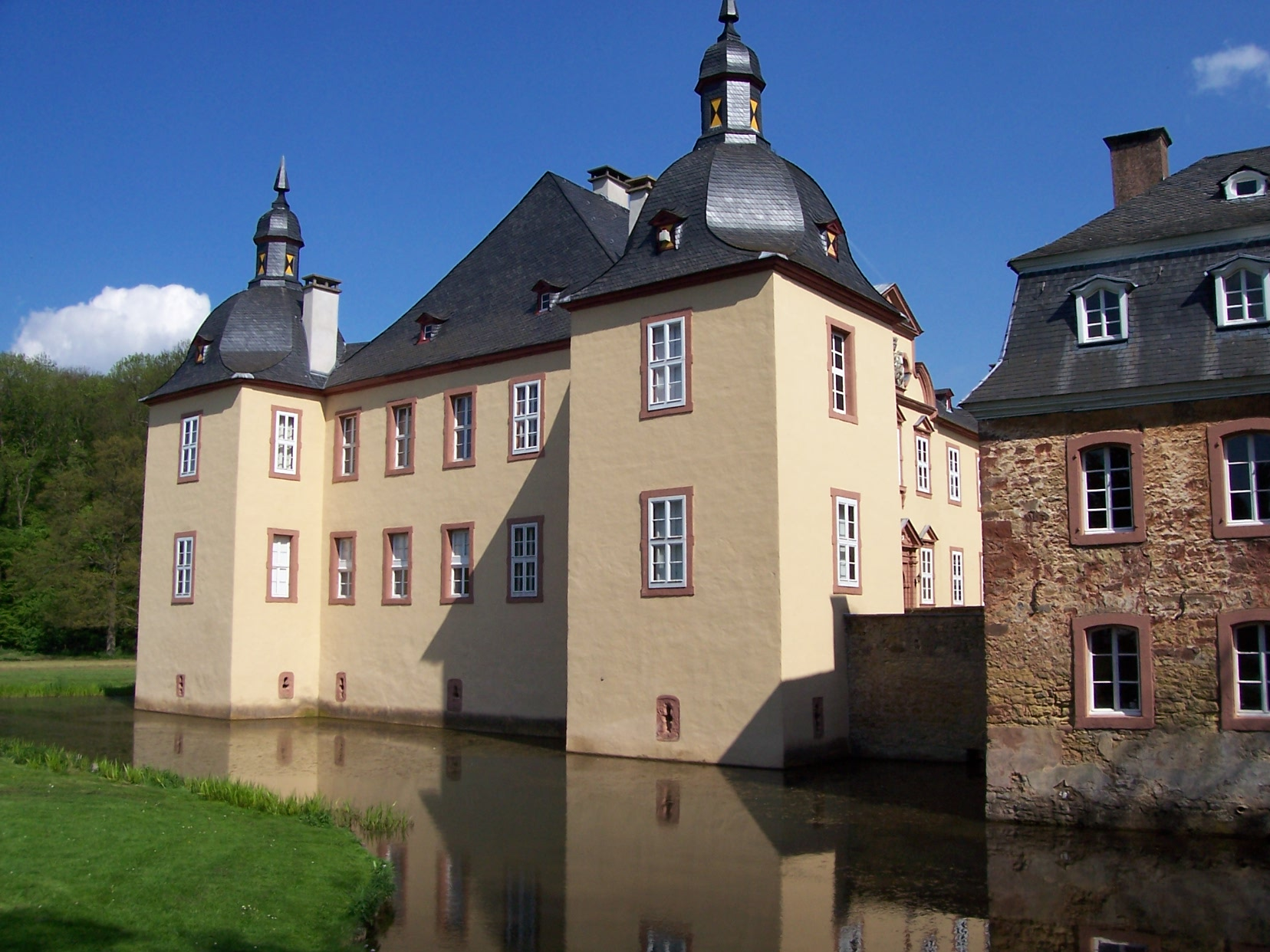
- Schloss Eicks from the west with moat

Site information
- Type: Renaissance Manson

Location
- Coordinates: 50°37′27″N 6°37′015.5″E

Site history
- Built by: Syberg family

Schloss Eicks is a mansion of Renaissance architecture located in the village of Eicks belonging to the town of Mechernich based in the district of Euskirchen in the south of the state of North Rhine-Westphalia, Germany.

Eicks Castle was first mentioned in the 14th century. Johann von Eicks had a small territory with its own jurisdiction. Eicks Castle, then a fortified water castle surrounded by a moat was destroyed in 1365.

After the extinction of the noble family Eicks, the castle changed hands frequently by inheritance and sale of their owners.

In the 16th century Jürgen von Syberg-Wischlingen acquired the site. The new manor was built in 1680 by Hermann Dietrich von Syberg.

From the still existing castle those medieval parts still usable were kept. Since then Eicks castle is a two-piece system with a three-winged castle and a separate manor, all surrounded by a moat.

The castle is now over 500 years in the possession of Sybergs family and kept as private property. It is not open to access to the public, but can be rented in parts for events.
