= List of mountains and hills of Rhineland-Palatinate =

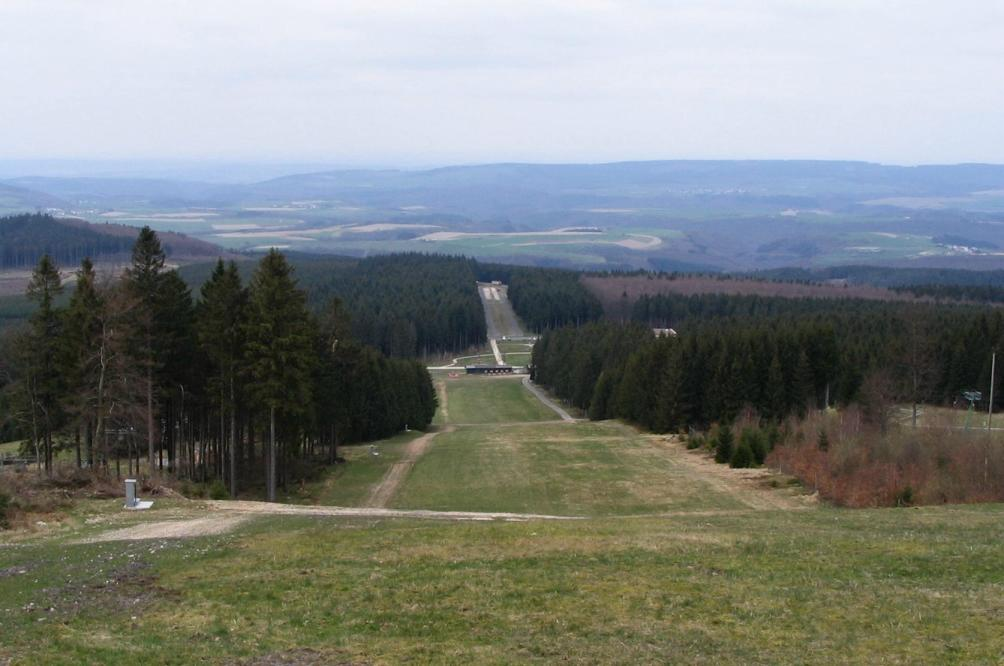
View from the Erbeskopf

This list of mountains and hills in Rhineland-Palatinate shows a selection of high and/or well-known mountains and hills in the German state of Rhineland-Palatinate (in order of height). Although there is no universally agreed definition, this list treats a mountain as an elevation of 2000 feet (612 m) or higher.

== Highest points of the Rhineland-Palatinate regions ==
The following table shows the highest mountains and hills of the Rhineland-Palatinate regions.

In the "Region" column, extensive or high ranges are shown in bold; whilst landscapes which either have no obvious high point or are lowlands with prominent hills (sometimes island-like) are shown in italics. Clicking on the word "List" (in the "Lists" column), links to further lists of mountains and hills in the particular region or landscape indicated (sometimes outside Rhineland-Palatinate).

The table, which is arranged in order of height, may be sorted by clicking on the symbol at the head of the relevant column.

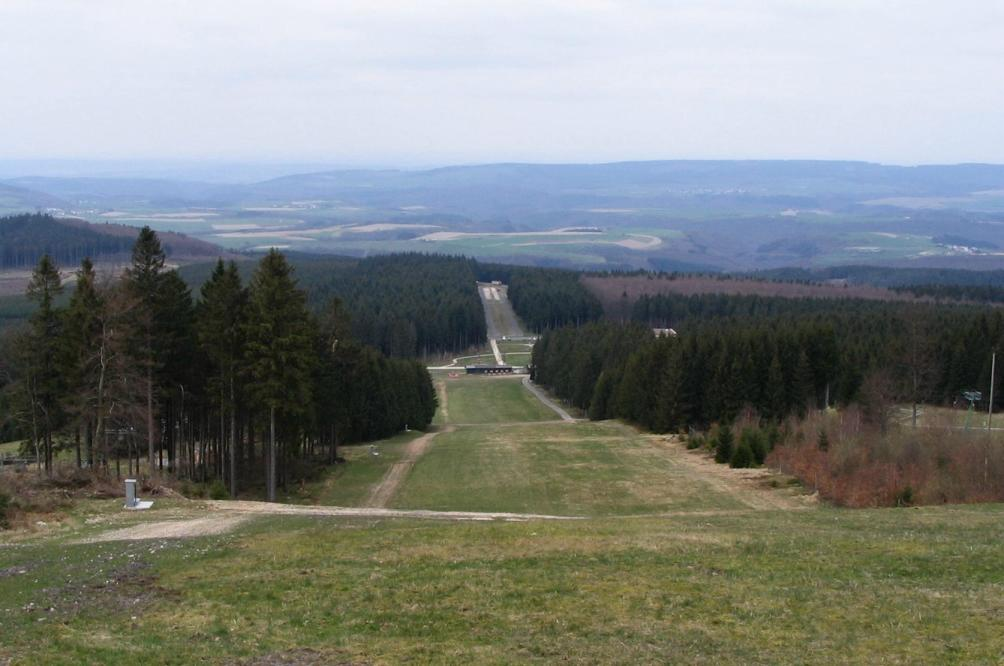
Erbeskopf (Schwarzwälder Hochwald, Hunsrück)

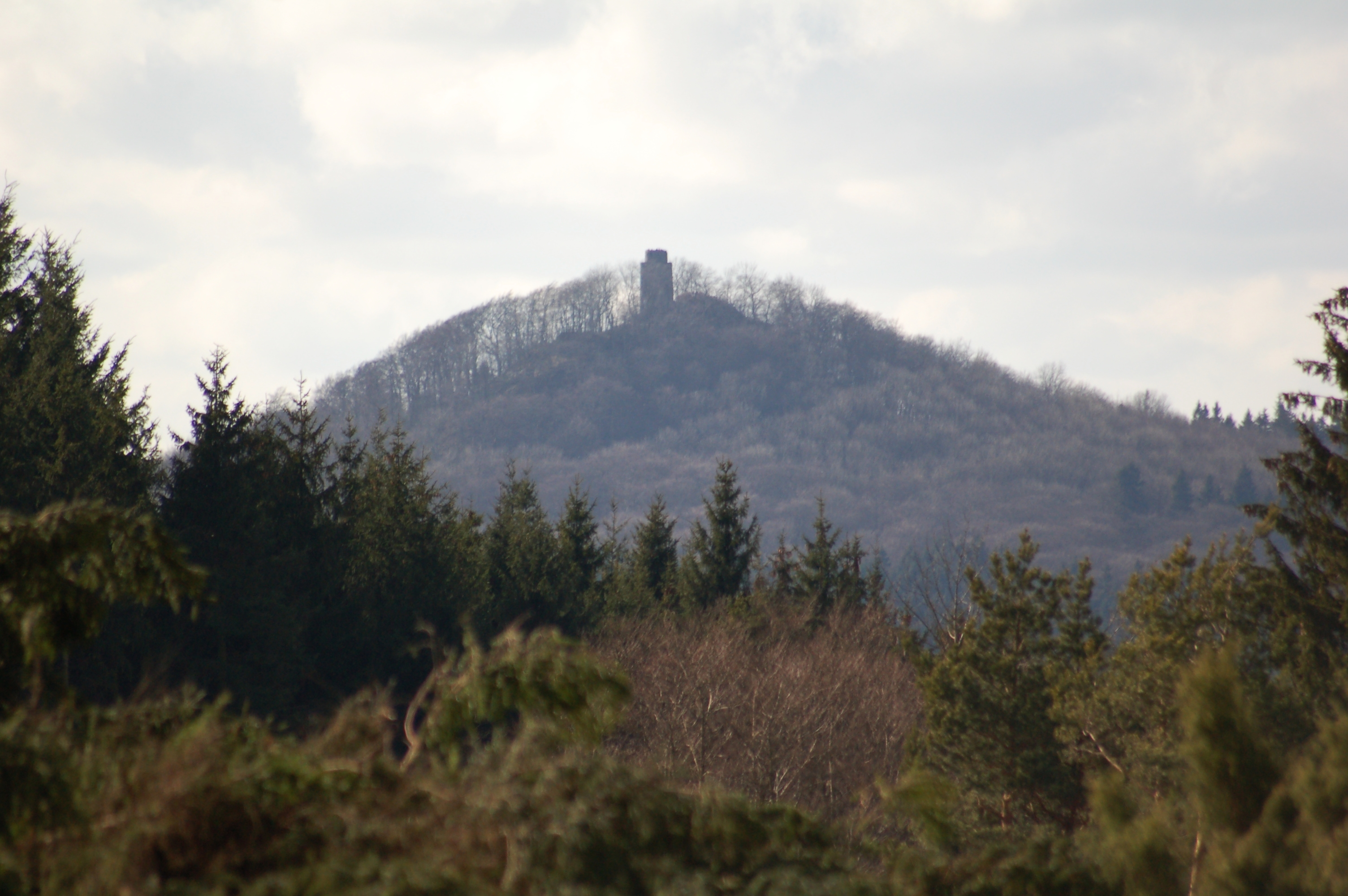
Hohe Acht (High Eifel, Eifel)

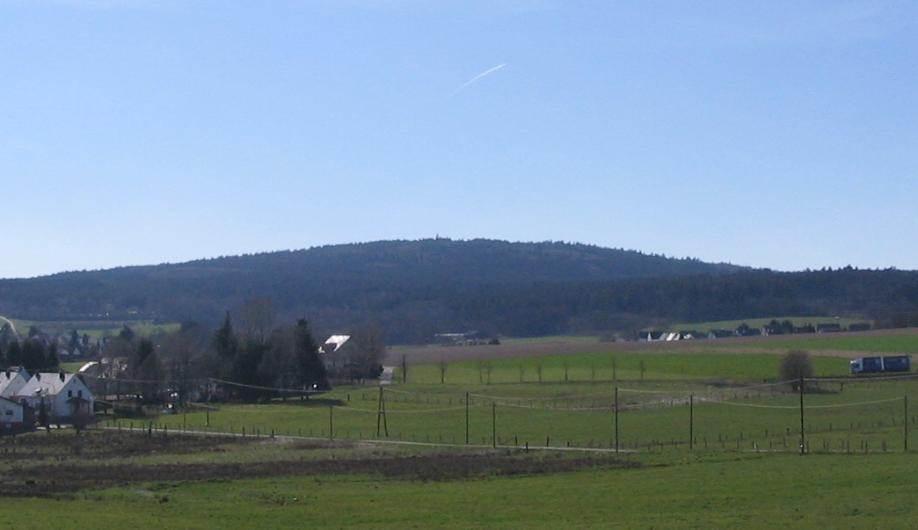
Rösterkopf (Osburger Hochwald, Hunsrück)

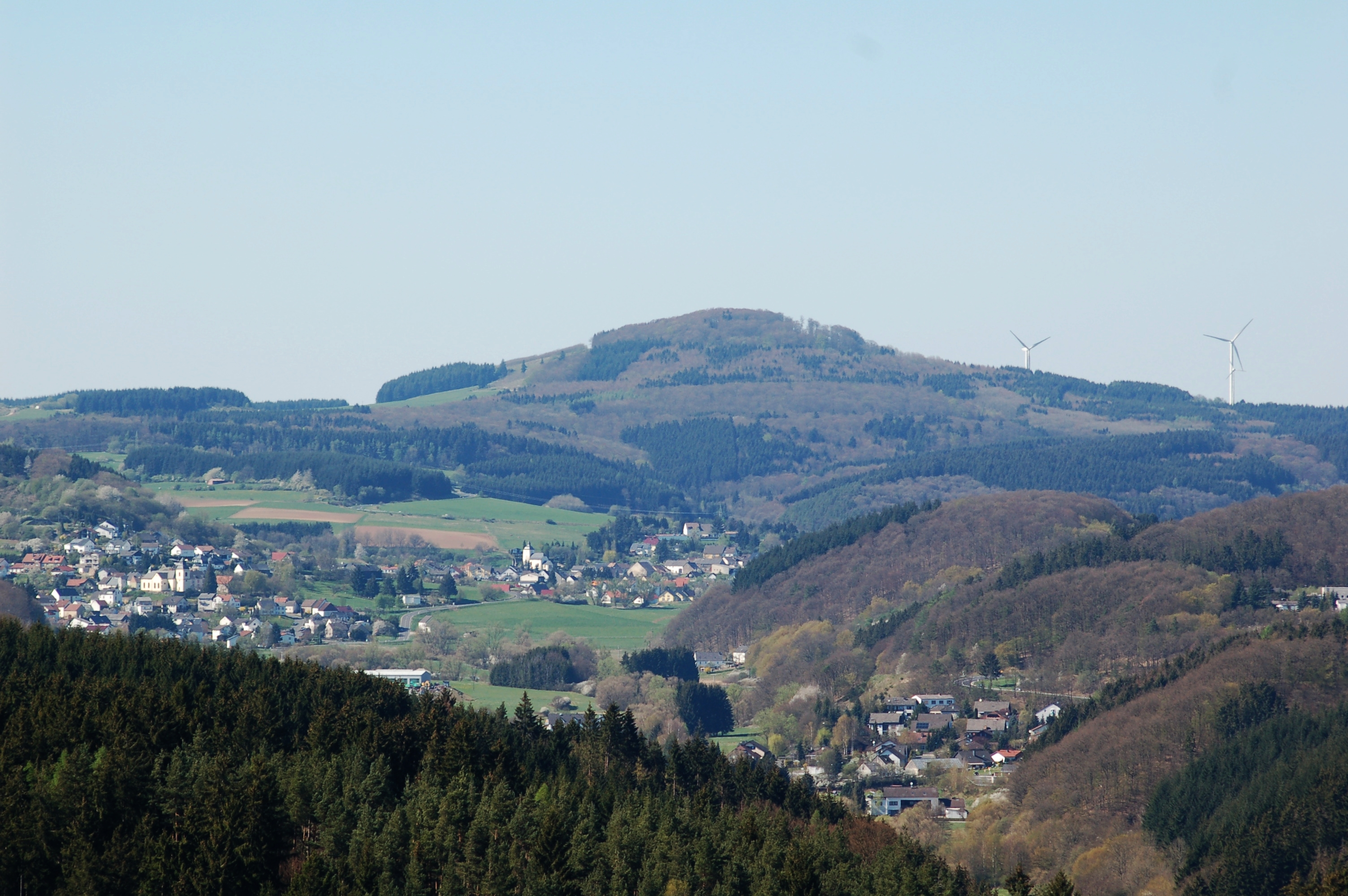
Ernstberg (Volcanic Eifel, Eifel)

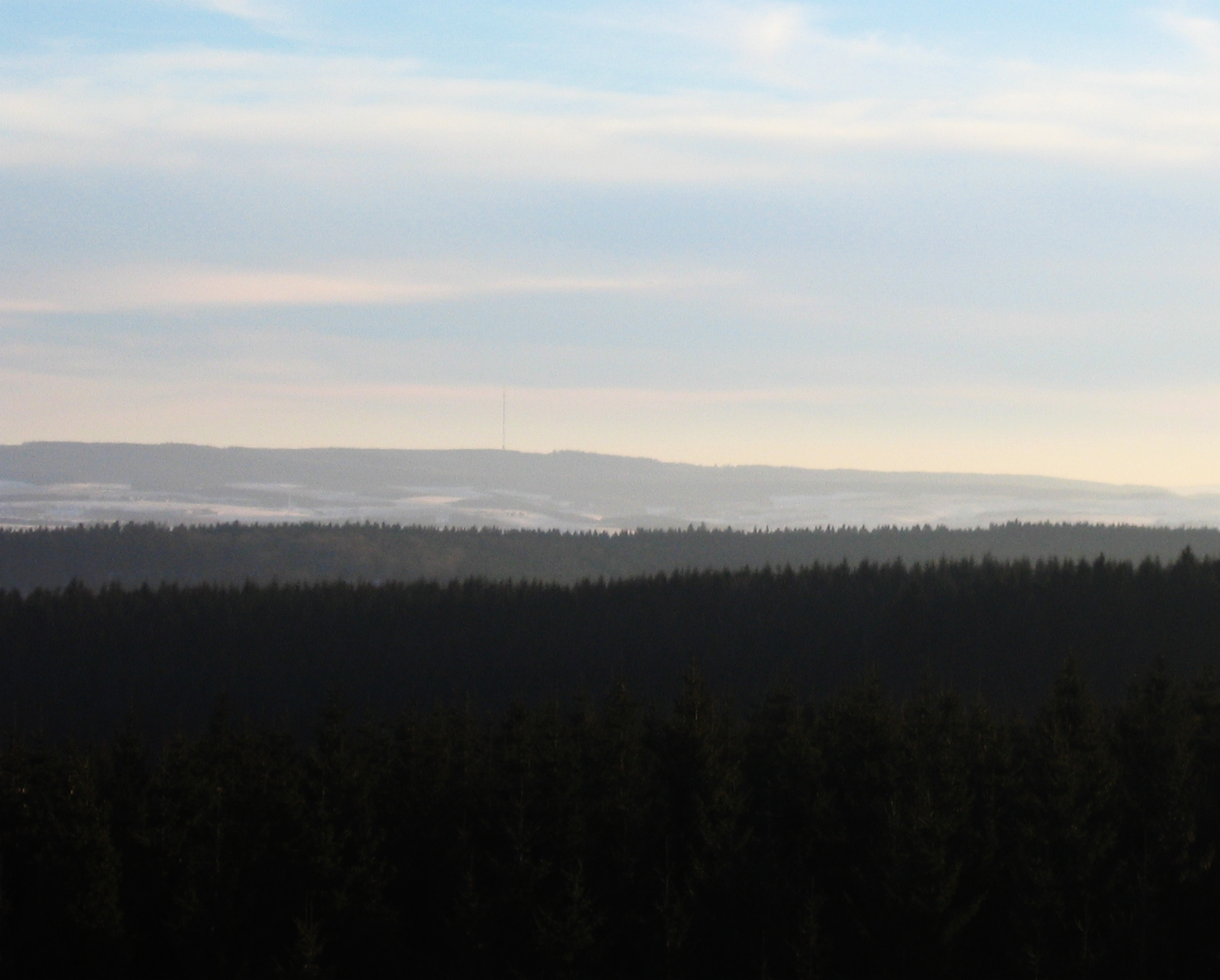
Schwarzer Mann (Schneifel, Eifel)

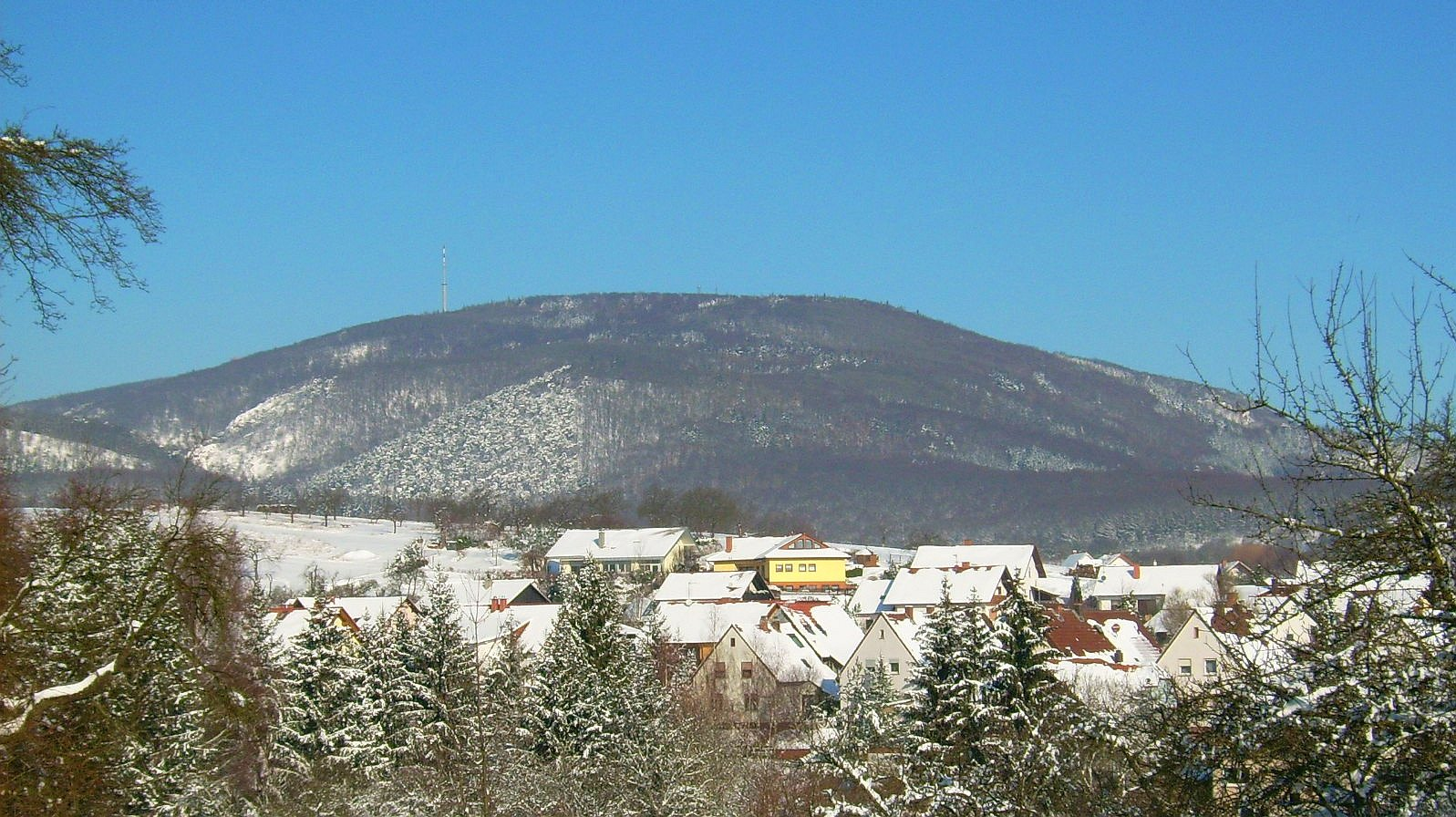
Donnersberg (North Palatine Uplands)

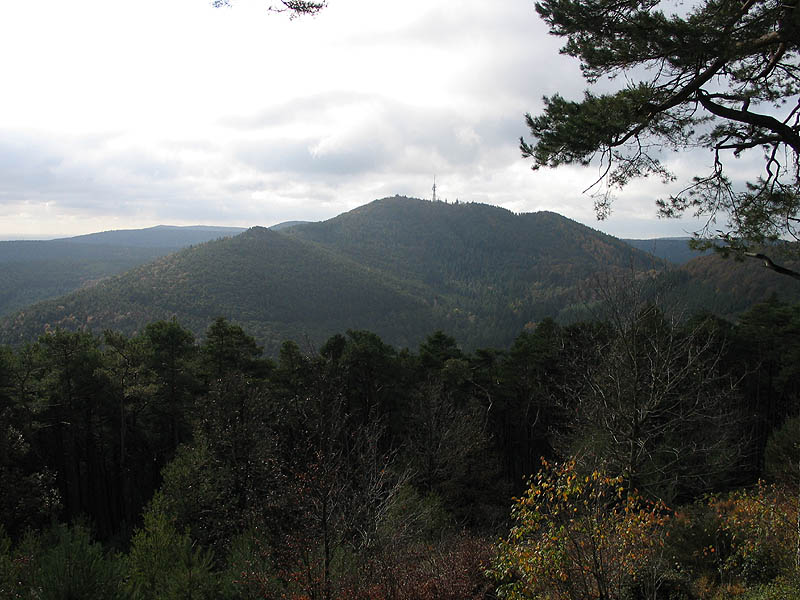
Kalmit (Haardt (Palatinate), Palatine Forest)

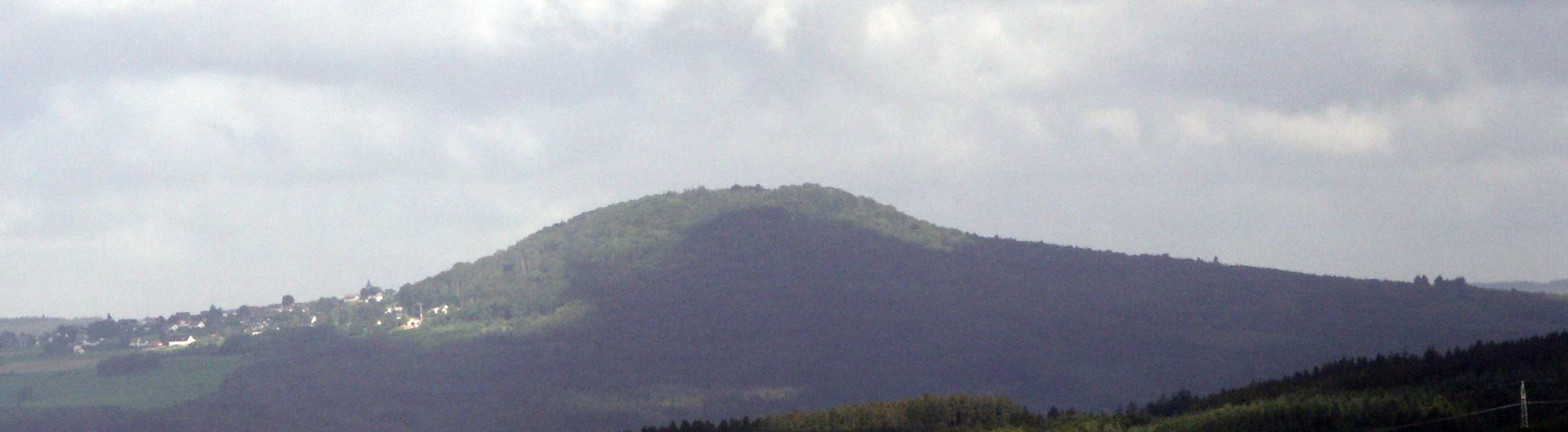
Aremberg (Ahr Hills, Eifel)

Mountain / Hill	Height (m)	Landscape	Lists of mountains & hills	County / Counties (or fed. state) Independent city / town
Erbeskopf	816.32	**Hunsrück** (Schwarzwälder Hochwald)	List; List	Bernkastel-Wittlich
An den zwei Steinen	766.2	Idar Forest; Part of the Hunsrück	List; List	Bernkastel-Wittlich, Birkenfeld
Hohe Acht	746.9	**Eifel** (High Eifel)	List; List	Ahrweiler, Mayen-Koblenz
Rösterkopf	708.1	Osburger Hochwald; Part of the Hunsrück	--- List	Trier-Saarburg
Ernstberg (Erensberg, Erresberg)	699.8	Vulkan Eifel; Part of the Eifel	List; List	Vulkaneifel
Unnamed peak (near the Schwarzer Mann)	699.1	Schneifel; Part of the Eifel	List; List	Eifelkreis Bitburg-Prüm
Donnersberg	686.5	**North Palatine Uplands**	List	Donnersberg
Kalmit	672.6	**Palatine Forest** (Haardt)	List; List	Neustadt, Südliche Weinstraße
Fuchskaute	657.3	**Westerwald** (High Westerwald)	List ---	Westerwald
Ellerspring	656.8	Soonwald; Part of the Hunsrück	List; List	Bad Kreuznach
Kandrich	638.6	Bingen Forest; Part of the Hunsrück	List; List	Bad Kreuznach
Aremberg	623.8	Ahr Hills; Part of the Eifel	List; List	Ahrweiler
Womrather Höhe	599.1	Lützelsoon; Part of the Hunsrück	List; List	Bad Kreuznach, Rhein-Hunsrück
namenlose Kuppe	477.5	Kondelwald	---	Bernkastel-Wittlich
Kewelsberg	441.8	Saargau	---	Trier-Saarburg
Asberg	441,0	Rheinwesterwald Volcanic Ridge; Part of the Westerwald	List; List	Neuwied
Lemberg	422.8	Naheland	---	Bad Kreuznach
Kappelberg	357.6	Rhenish-Hessian Hills	List	Alzey-Worms
Auf der Platte	337.0	Alzey Hills	List	Bad Dürkheim

== Mountains ==
Name, Height in metres above sea level (NN), Location (district/region). Three ??? mean unknown or not yet researched; please add information!

1. Erbeskopf (816 m), Bernkastel-Wittlich district, Schwarzwälder Hochwald, Hunsrück
2. An den zwei Steinen (766 m), Bernkastel-Wittlich district, Idar Forest, Hunsrück
3. Kahlheid (766 m), Bernkastel-Wittlich district, Idar Forest, Hunsrück
4. Steingerüttelkopf (757 m), Birkenfeld district, Idar Forest, Hunsrück
5. Sandkopf (756 m), Trier-Saarburg district, Schwarzwälder Hochwald, Hunsrück
6. Ruppelstein (755 m), Birkenfeld district, Schwarzwälder Hochwald, Hunsrück
7. Hohe Acht (747 m), Ahrweiler district, High Eifel, Eifel
8. Idarkopf (746 m), Birkenfeld district, Idar Forest, Hunsrück
9. Usarkopf (724 m), Birkenfeld district, Idar Forest, Hunsrück
10. Butterhecker Steinköpfe (723 m), Birkenfeld district, Schwarzwälder Hochwald, Hunsrück
11. Ringelkopf (712 m), Birkenfeld district, Schwarzwälder Hochwald, Hunsrück
12. Rösterkopf (708 m), Trier-Saarburg district, Osburger Hochwald, Hunsrück
13. Friedrichskopf (707 m), Birkenfeld district, Dollberge/Schwarzwälder Hochwald, Hunsrück
14. Ernstberg (Erresberg) (698.8 m), Vulkaneifel district, High Eifel, Eifel
15. Schwarzer Mann (697.3 m), Bitburg-Prüm Eifel district, Schneifel, Eifel
16. Teufelskopf (695 m), Trier-Saarburg district, Irrwald/Schwarzwälder Hochwald, Hunsrück
17. Schimmelkopf (694.8 m), Merzig-Wadern district, Irrwald/Schwarzwälder Hochwald, Hunsrück
18. Mückenbornberg (691 m), Trier-Saarburg district, Irrwald/Schwarzwälder Hochwald, Hunsrück
19. Scharteberg (691 m), Vulkaneifel district, High Eifel, Eifel
20. Donnersberg (687 m), Donnersbergkreis, North Palatine Uplands
21. Prümscheid (675 m), Vulkaneifel district, High Eifel, Eifel
22. Wildenburger Kopf (674 m), Birkenfeld district, Schwarzwälder Hochwald, Hunsrück
23. Kalmit (673 m), Südliche Weinstraße district, Haardt, Palatine Forest
24. Hohe Wurzel (669 m), Trier-Saarburg district, Osburg High Forest, Hunsrück
25. Schöneberg (668 m), Ahrweiler district, Schneifel, Eifel
26. Wehlenstein (668 m), Birkenfeld district, Schwarzwälder Hochwald, Hunsrück
27. Sandkopf (665 m), Birkenfeld district, Schwarzwälder Hochwald, Hunsrück
28. Kesselberg (663 m), Südliche Weinstraße district, Haardt, Palatine Forest
29. Seimersberg (663 m), Bitburg-Prüm Eifel district, Schneifel, Eifel
30. Ellerspring (657 m), Bad Kreuznach district, Soonwald, Hunsrück
31. Fuchskaute (657 m), Westerwald district, High Westerwald, Westerwald
32. Stegskopf (654.4 m), Altenkirchen district, Westerwald
33. Salzburger Kopf (654.2 m), Westerwaldkreis, Westerwald
34. Simmerkopf (653 m), Rhein-Hunsrück district, Soonwald, Hunsrück
35. Ringkopf (650 m), Birkenfeld district, Schwarzwälder Hochwald, Hunsrück
36. Opel (649 m), Bad Kreuznach district and Landkreis Rhein-Hunsrück district, Soonwald, Hunsrück
37. Hochsteinchen (648 m), Rhein-Hunsrück district, Soonwald, Hunsrück
38. Nerother Kopf (647 m), Vulkaneifel district, High Eifel, Eifel
39. Mörschieder Burr] (646 m), Birkenfeld district, Schwarzwälder Hochwald, Hunsrück
40. Prümer Kopf (646 m), Bitburg-Prüm Eifel district, Schneifel, Eifel
41. Schanzerkopf (643 m), Rhein-Hunsrück district, Soonwald, Hunsrück
42. Kühlfelder Stein (638 m), ??? district, Westerwald
43. Esselsberg (637 m), ??? district, High Eifel, Eifel
44. Kandrich (637 m), Mainz-Bingen district, Bingen Forest, Hunsrück
45. Katzenkopf (637 m), Rhein-Hunsrück district, Soonwald, Hunsrück
46. Roßberg (637 m), Südliche Weinstraße district, Haardt, Palatine Forest
47. Hochberg (636 m), Südliche Weinstraße district, Haardt, Palatine Forest
48. Ochsenbaumer Höhe (632 m), Rhein-Hunsrück district, Soonwald, Hunsrück
49. Salzkopf (628 m), Mainz-Bingen district, Bingen Forest, Hunsrück
50. Aremberg (623.0 m), Ahrweiler district, Ahr Hills, Eifel
51. Silberich (623 m), Birkenfeld district, Schwarzwälder Hochwald, Hunsrück
52. Alteburg (621 m), Bad Kreuznach district, Soonwald, Hunsrück
53. Vorkastell (620 m), ??? district, Dollberge/Schwarzwälder Hochwald, Hunsrück
54. Hohe Loog (619 m), town of Neustadt an der Weinstraße, Haardt, Palatine Forest
55. Franzosenkopf (618 m), Mainz-Bingen district, Bingen Forest, Hunsrück
56. Blättersberg with the Ludwig Tower (617.5 m), Südliche Weinstraße district, Haardt, Palatine Forest
57. Schafkopf (617 m), Südliche Weinstraße district, Palatine Forest
58. Höchstberg (616 m), ??? district, Vulkaneifel, Eifel
59. Auf der Wurst (615 m), ??? district, Schneifel, Eifel
60. Alsberg (613 m), Westerwald district, Westerwald
61. Steigerkopf (also: Schänzel) with the Schänzel Tower (613 m), Südliche Weinstraße district, Palatine Forest

== Hills ==
1. Dreiser Höhe (611 m), ??? district, High Eifel, Eifel
2. Blattersberg (609 m), Südliche Weinstraße district, Palatine Forest
3. Eschkopf (609 m), Südwestpfalz district, Palatine Forest
4. Mosisberg (609 m), Südwestpfalz district, Palatine Forest
5. Morschenberg (608 m), Südliche Weinstraße district, Haardt, Palatine Forest
6. Rothsohlberg (607 m), Südliche Weinstraße district, Haardt, Palatine Forest
7. Steffelnkopf (607 m), ??? district, Schneifel, Eifel
8. Weißenberg (607 m), Südwestpfalz district, Palatine Forest
9. Hortenkopf (606 m), Südwestpfalz district, Palatine Forest
10. Taubenkopf (604 m), town of Neustadt an der Weinstraße, Haardt, Palatine Forest
11. Heimerich (601 m), ??? district, Westerwald
12. Teufelsberg (598 m), Südliche Weinstraße district, Haardt, Palatine Forest
13. Hardtkopf (597 m), Bitburg-Prüm Eifel district, South Eifel, Eifel
14. Womrather Höhe (597 m), Rhein-Hunsrück district, Lützelsoon, Hunsrück
15. Hochsimmer (587.9 m), Mayen-Koblenz district, High Eifel
16. Herzerberg (585 m), Kusel district, North Palatine Uplands
17. Orensberg (581 m), Südliche Weinstraße district, Haardt, Palatine Forest
18. Rehberg (576.8 m), Südliche Weinstraße district, Wasgau, Palatine Forest
19. Stolzberg (572 m), Kusel district, North Palatine Uplands
20. Schindhübel (571 m), Bad Dürkheim district, Palatine Forest
21. Drachenfels (570.8 m), Bad Dürkheim district, Palatine Forest
22. Bloskülb (570 m), Bad Dürkheim district, Palatine Forest
23. Großer Adelberg (569 m), Südliche Weinstraße district, Palatine Forest
24. Brogberg (567 m), Bad Dürkheim district, Palatine Forest
25. Hoher Stoppelkopf (567 m), Bad Dürkheim district, Palatine Forest
26. Königsberg (567 m), Kusel district, North Palatine Uplands
27. Almersberg (564 m), Südliche Weinstraße district, Palatine Forest
28. Potzberg (562 m), Kusel district, North Palatine Uplands
29. Steinberger Ley] (558 m), ??? district, Vulkaneifel, Eifel
30. Hohenberg (556 m), Südliche Weinstraße district, Haardt, Palatine Forest
31. Rockeskyller Kopf (555 m), Vulkan Eifel district, Vulkaneifel
32. Weinbiet (553 m), town of Neustadt an der Weinstraße, Haardt, Palatine Forest
33. Koppensteiner Höhe (551 m), Rhein-Hunsrück district, Soonwald, Hunsrück
34. Hoher List (549 m), Vulkan Eifel district, Vulkaneifel, Eifel
35. Selberg (546 m), Kusel district, North Palatine Uplands
36. Montabaurer Höhe (545 m), Westerwald district, Westerwald
37. Köppel (540 m), Westerwald district, Westerwald
38. Herrmannsberg (536 m), Kusel district, North Palatine Uplands
39. Bobenthaler Knopf (534 m), Südwestpfalz district, Palatine Forest
40. Hohenseelbachskopf (530 m),??? district, Westerwald
41. Bornberg (Palatinate) (520 m), Kusel district, North Palatine Uplands
42. Rahnfels (517 m), Bad Dürkheim district, Haardt, Palatine Forest
43. Eckkopf (516 m), Bad Dürkheim district, Palatine Forest
44. Großer Eyberg (513 m), Südwestpfalz district, Palatine Forest
45. Hochthürmerberg (499.8 m), Euskirchen district, Ahr Hills
46. Stabenberg (496 m), town of Neustadt an der Weinstraße, Haardt, Palatine Forest
47. Goßberg (Hunsrück) (494 m), Rhein-Hunsrück district
48. Peterskopf (487 m), Bad Dürkheim district, Haardt, Palatine Forest
49. Weilerskopf (470 m), Bad Dürkheim district, Haardt, Palatine Forest
50. Asberg (441 m), Neuwied district, Unkel
51. Spitzkopf (429 m), Bad Dürkheim district, Palatine Forest
52. Dernbacher Kopf (427 m), Neuwied district, Dernbach (near Dierdorf)
53. Meerberg (422 m), Neuwied district, Linz
54. Lemberg (422 m), Bad Kreuznach district, Naheland
55. Hochberg (421 m), Südwestpfalz district, Wasgau, Palatine Forest
56. Heidenberg with the Buchkammerfels (420 m), Südwestpfalz district, Wasgau, Palatine Forest
57. Minderberg (417 m), Neuwied district, Linz
58. Heiße Bäumchen (410 m), Bad Ems district, Dachsenhausen
59. Mainzer Berg (Palatinate) (403 m), Bad Dürkheim district, Palatine Forest
60. Wetterkreuzberg (400.7 m), Südliche Weinstraße district, Palatine Forest
61. Beulskopf (388 m), Altenkirchen district, Westerwald
62. Kühkopf (382 m), town of Koblenz, Hunsrück
63. Remigiusberg (368 m), Kusel district, North Palatine Uplands
64. Liescher Berg (347 m), Trier-Saarburg district, Saargau
65. Teufelsstein (317 m), Bad Dürkheim district, Haardt, Palatine Forest
66. Mont Royal (305 m), Bernkastel-Wittlich district, Kondelwald
67. Kleine Kalmit (270 m), Südliche Weinstraße district/Landau in der Palatinate
68. Zotzenheimer Horn with the Napoleonshöhe (270 m), Mainz-Bingen district
69. Petersberg (246 m), Alzey-Worms district, Rheinhessen
70. Ehrenbreitstein (118 m), town of Koblenz

== See also ==
- List of the highest mountains in Germany
- List of the highest mountains in the German states
- List of mountain and hill ranges in Germany
