= Osburger Hochwald =

Coordinates: 49°40′N 6°49′E

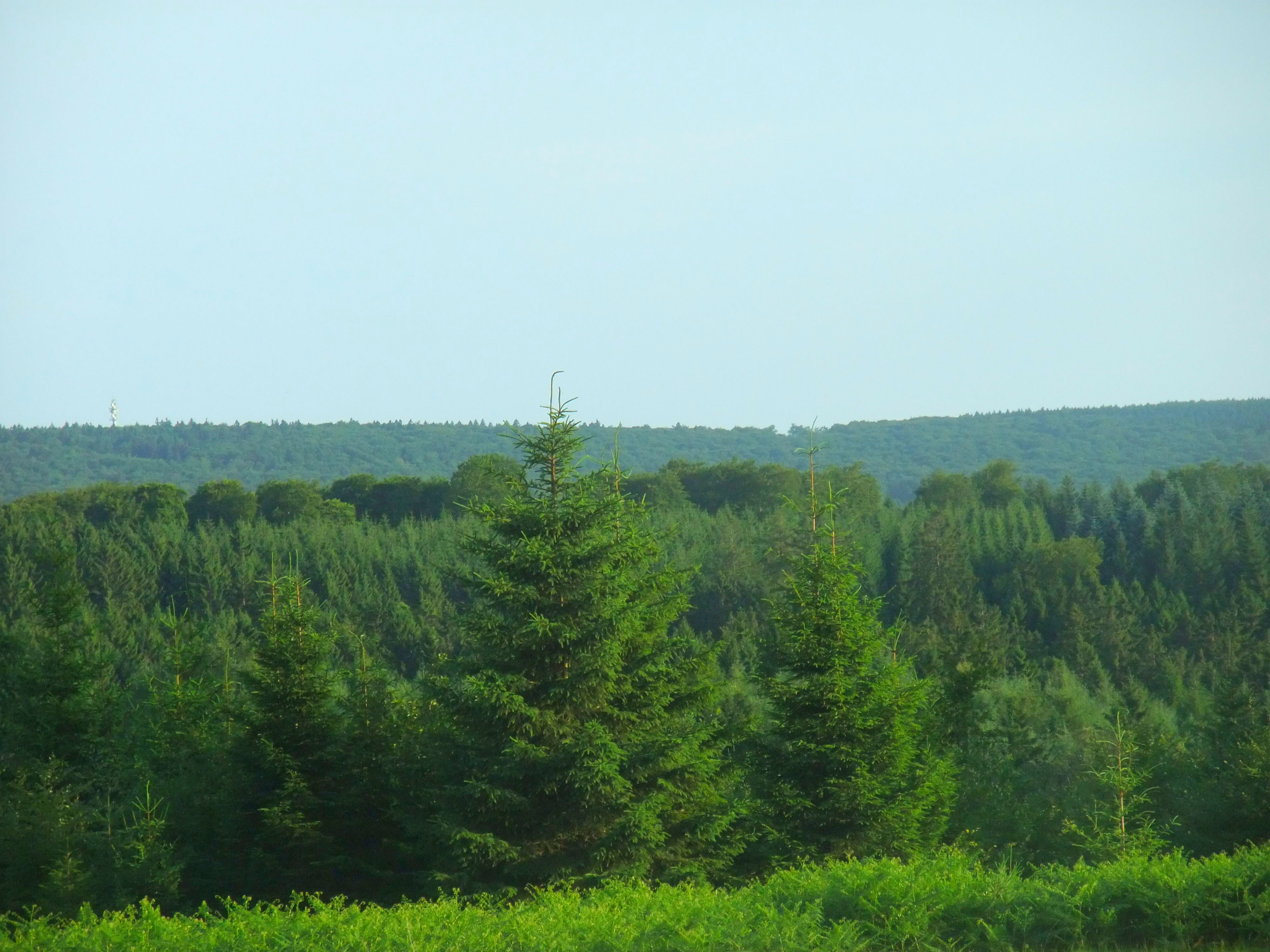
The Osburger Hochwald

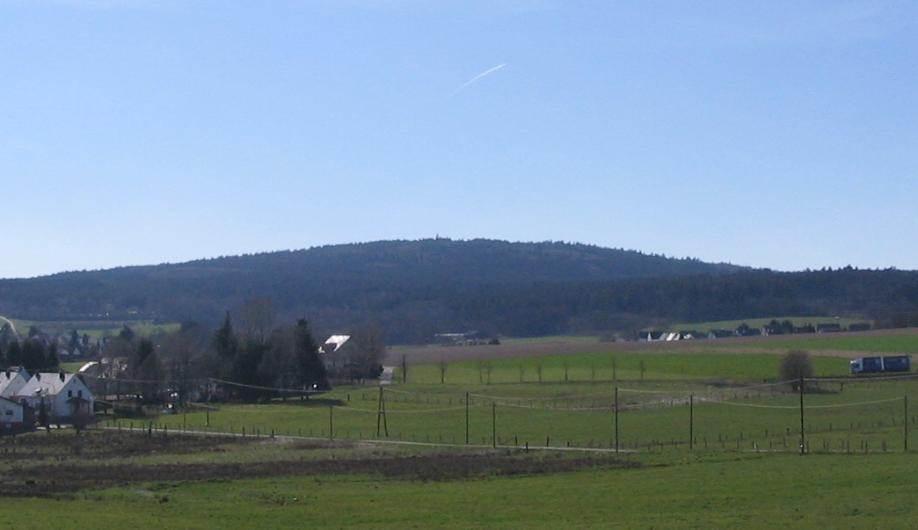
The Rösterkopf near Reinsfeld

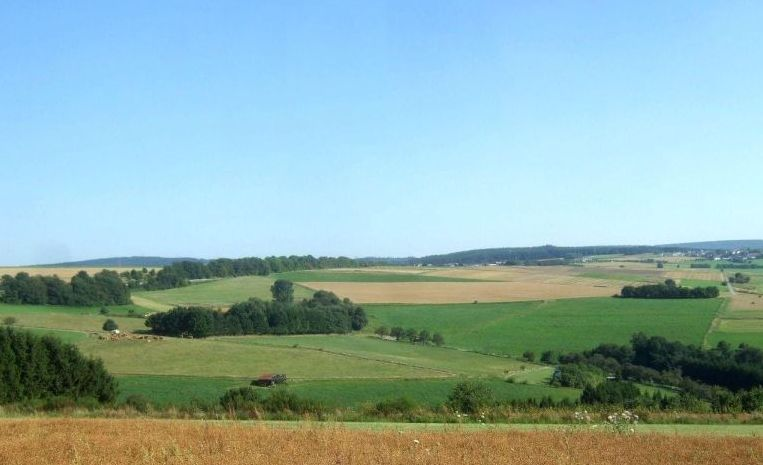
The Osburger Hunsrück near Thomm/Osburg and Osburger Hochwald on the horizon. Left: the Hohe Wurzel; right: the Rösterkopf

The Osburger Hochwald ("Osburg Upland Forest") lies southeast of the Osburger Hunsrück and has an area of 75 square kilometres. Together with the Schwarzwälder Hochwald, it forms the Hochwald or "upland forest" of the Hunsrück, the southwestern part of the Rhenish Massif in the German state of Rhineland-Palatinate. The area belongs to the Saar-Hunsrück Nature Park. Northeast of the Hochwald are the Idar Forest and Soonwald.

At the foot of the Rösterkopf rises the River Ruwer, a right tributary of the Moselle. The watershed between the Moselle (Feller Bach and Ruwer) and the Saar (Wadrill/Prims) runs through the Osburger Hochwald. The B 52 federal road and A 1 motorway, as well as several local, county and state roads, run through the forest. There are rescue points for the emergency services at various prominent places in the forest.

The Hohwäller dialect of the area is part of the Moselle Franconian dialect group.

== Literature ==
- Dittmar Lauer, Manfred Moßmann (eds.): Hohwäller. Ein Sammelband Hochwälder Mundart; Kell am See: Verlag Alta Silva, 2006, ISBN 978-3-9810762-0-2 (Abbildung )
