= Idarkopf =

Mountain in Germany

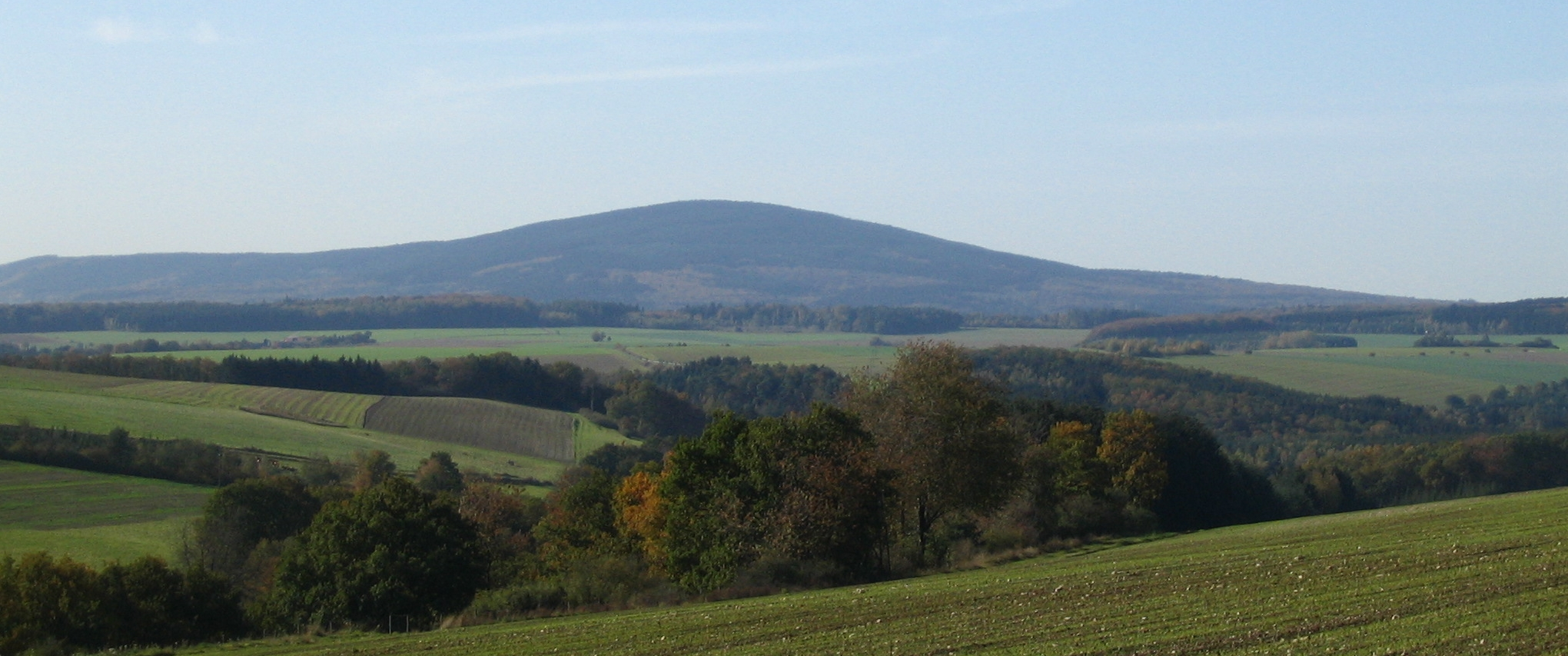
- The prominent Idarkopf dominates the Hunsrück

Highest point
- Elevation: 745.7 m above sea level (NHN) (2,447 ft)
- Coordinates: 49°51′40″N 7°16′18″E

Geography
- Location within Rhineland-Palatinate
- Location: near Stipshausen; Landkreis Birkenfeld and Bernkastel-Wittlich, Rhineland-Palatinate, Germany
- Parent range: Idar Forest (Hunsrück)

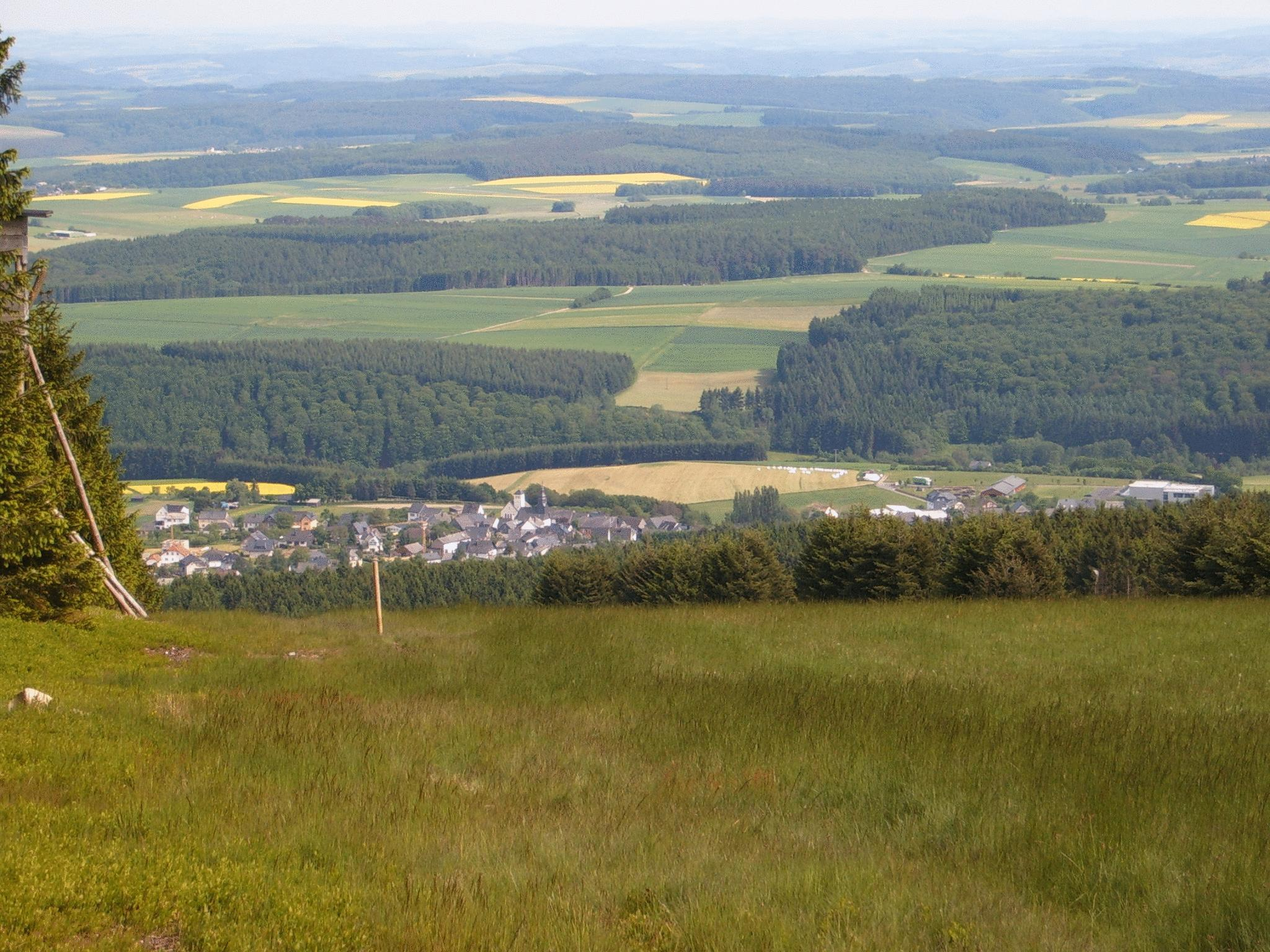
View from the Idarkopf over the former ski slopes and Stipshausen looking southeast roughly towards Kirn

The Idarkopf near Stipshausen in the Hunsrück is a mountain, 745.7 m above sea level (NHN), within the Idar Forest in the German counties of Birkenfeld and Bernkastel-Wittlich. It is one of the highest mountains in the state of Rhineland-Palatinate.

== Geography ==
=== Location ===
The Idarkopf lies in the northeastern part of the Idar Forest and within the Saar-Hunsrück Nature Park. Its summit rises around 2 km northwest of the village of Stipshausen (county of Birkenfeld) and 4 km southeast of the village of Hochscheid (Bernkastel-Wittlich). Whilst the summit and the southeastern flank of the mountain belong to Stipshausen, its western flanks up to the crest and northern to northeastern areas belong to the village of Weitersbach (county of Birkenfeld) which lies 3.5 km east-northeast of the summit (both distances as the crow flies). The Idarbach stream flows past the Idarkopf to the northeast.

== Towers ==
About 200 metres northwest of the summit of the Idarkopf at a height of 744.2 m stands the observation tower known as the Idarkopf Tower, from which there are views, for example, of the Taunus, the Donnersberg across the Hunsrück, to the Eifel and of the Westerwald. Around 300 metres northeast of the summit at a height of about 738 m stands a transmission tower.
