= Hohe Wurzel =

Hohe Wurzel may refer to two mountains in Germany:

- Hohe Wurzel (Hunsrück), in Rhineland-Palatinate
- Hohe Wurzel (Taunus), in Hesse
