= Rockeskyller Kopf =

Mountain in Germany

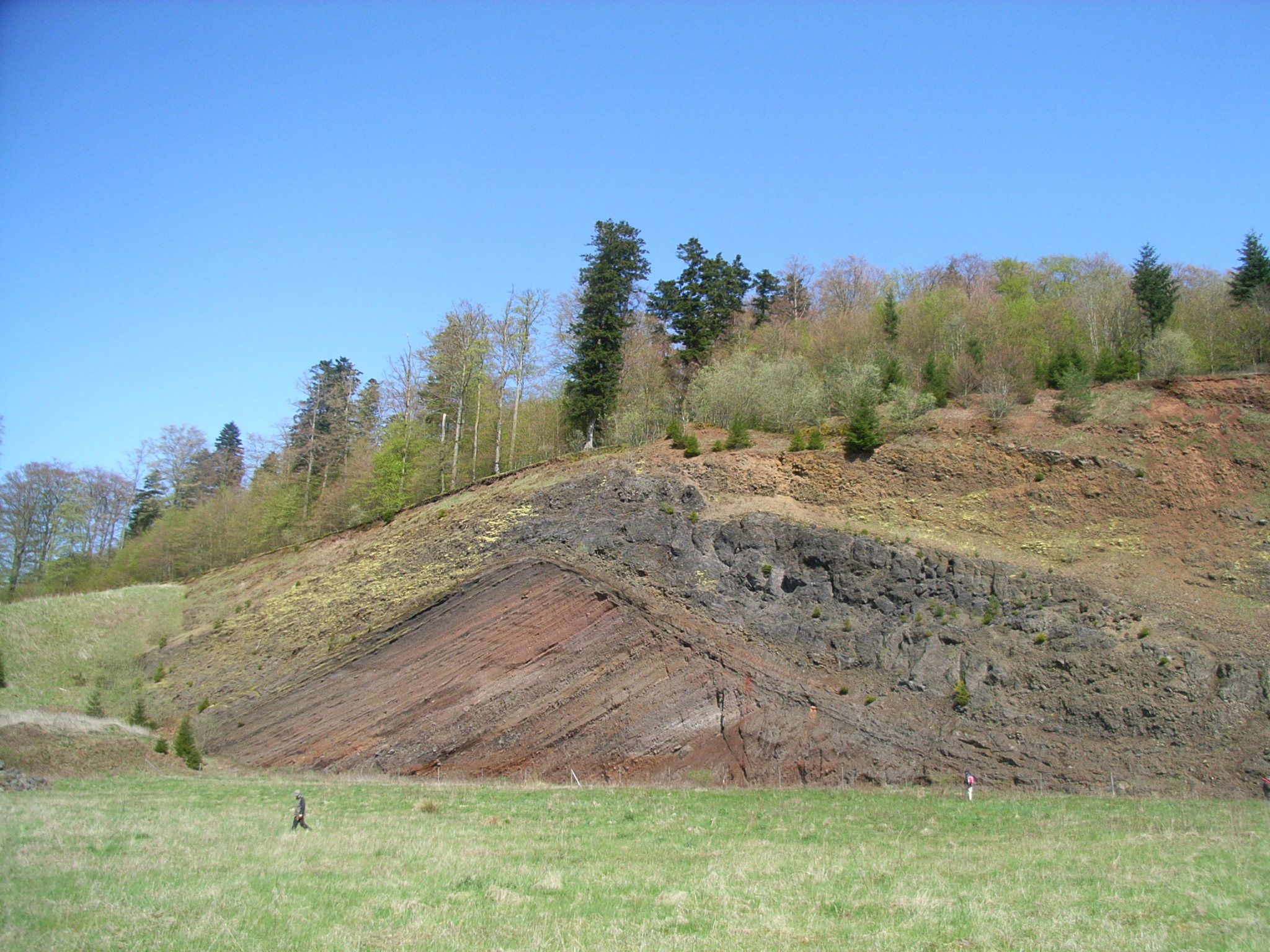
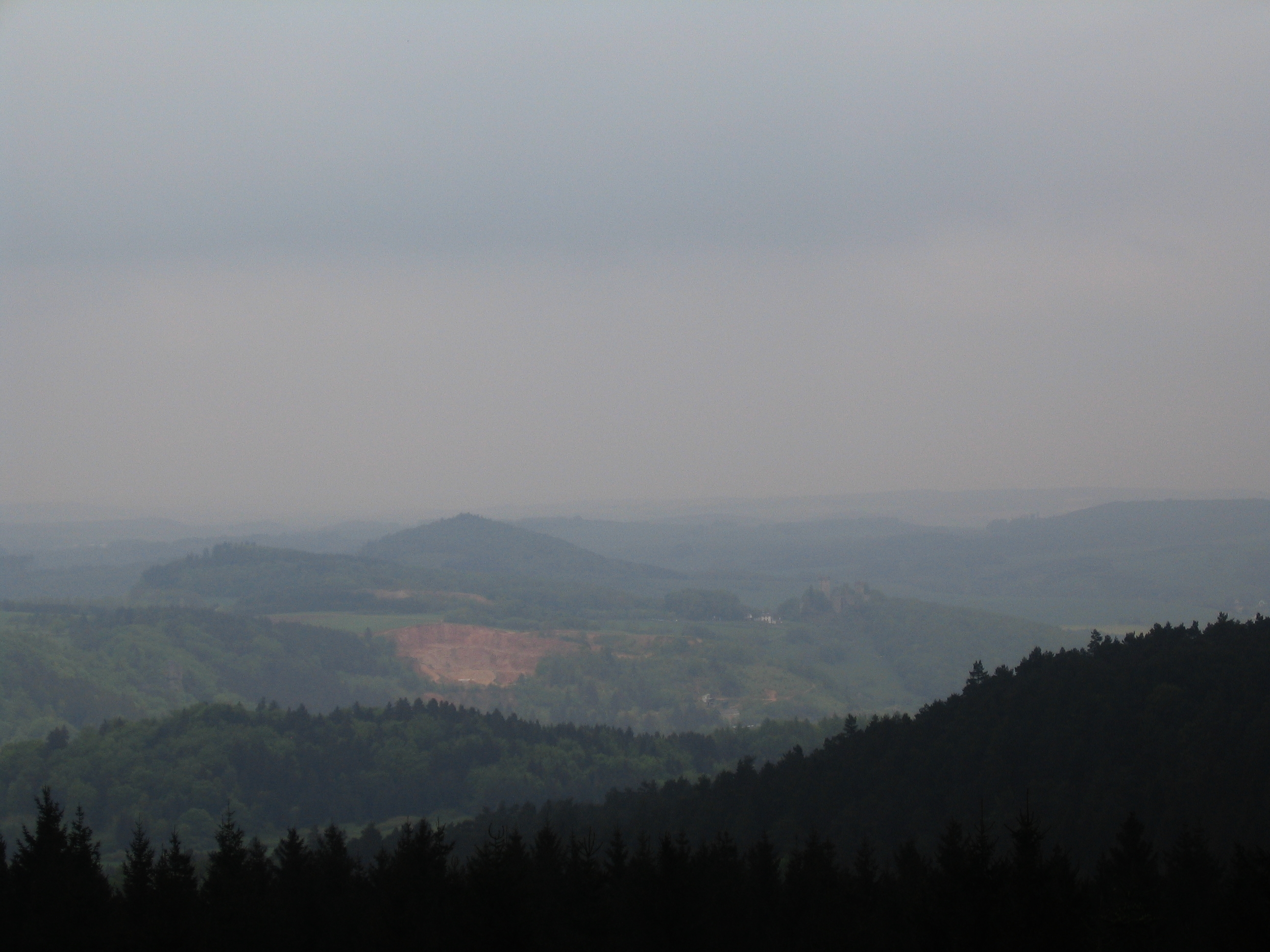
- Section through the rim of the crater of the cinder cone The Rockeskyller Kopf (centre left) and Kasselburg (centre right)

Highest point
- Elevation: 554.6 m above sea level (NHN) (1,820 ft)
- Coordinates: 50°15′9.5″N 6°40′46.5″E

Geography
- Location within Rhineland-Palatinate
- Location: Near Rockeskyll; Vulkaneifel, Rhineland-Palatinate (Germany)
- Parent range: Eifel

Geology
- Rock age(s): Quaternary, (c. 360,000 years ago)
- Mountain type: Extinguished cinder cone
- Rock type(s): Basalt and molten bunter sandstone

The Rockeskyller Kopf near Rockeskyll in the county of Vulkaneifel in the German state of Rhineland-Palatinate is a hill, 554.6 m above sea level (NHN), in the Eifel mountains. It is an extinct volcano complex from the Quaternary period, around 360,000 years old and is designated as a natural monument (ND-7233-420).

== Geography ==
=== Location ===
The Rockeskyller Kopf lies within the Volcanic Eifel Nature Park. Its summit rises around 1 kilometre west of Rockeskyll, 1 kilometre east of Bewingen and 1.6 kilometres southeast of Dohm-Lammersdorf. Flowing past the hill to the east is the Kaulbach, a right headstream of the Hangelsbach which passes to the southeast; the latter discharges southeast of the hill near the Pelm settlement of Schloßbrunnen Gerolstein into the Kyll which in turn runs past to the southwest and south.

=== Natural regions ===
The Rockeskyller Kopf belongs to the natural regional major unit group of the East Eifel (no. 27), in the major unit of the Limestone Eifel (276), in the sub-unit of the Northern Volcanic Eifel (276.8) and to the natural regions of Kyll-Volcanic Eifel (Kyll-Vulkaneifel, 276.80) in the west and Dockweiler Volcanic Eifel (Dockweiler Vulkaneifel, 276.81) in the east.

== Surrounding volcanic region ==
The Rockeskyller Kopf is part of a volcanic complex, which comprises several cinder cones that are interconnected. The neighbouring kuppen of the Mäuseberg and Giesenheld also belong to this complex. Experts estimate that there were five to seven eruption sites which built up successively during the course of volcanic activity and were linked together and overlapped.

The cinder cone is the typical positive landscape and volcanic shape of the Eifel – in contrast with the maars, which as volcanic pipes represent a negative landscape form.

== Formation ==
The formation of the Rockeskyller Kopf began, as in the case of the maars, with steam explosions, which piled up coarse-grained lapilli. Next came Strombolian eruptions, as the intermittent ejection of incandescent cinder is called. The hot cinders melted on impact to become scoria, which is easily confused with lava flows. In the final phase, lava streams were outpoured, whose remains may still be seen as lava sheets or pipe filling.

The photograph of the longitudinally section rim of the crater shows this succession. The reddish strata sloping to the left are the depositions of lapilli. On their right flank follow, first of all, a thin layer of ejected material (tuff) and then the thicker, black layer of scoria.

== Protected areas ==
On the Rockeskyller Kopf are parts of the protected landscape of Gerolstein and Surrounding Area (Gerolstein und Umgebung, CDDA no. 321065; designated in 1983; 124.1171 km^{2}) and of the Vulkaneifel bird reserve (VSG no. 5706-401; 11.25 km^{2}).

== See also ==
- List of volcanoes of Germany

== Literature ==
- Vulkanologische Karte West- und Hocheifel 1:50.000 von G. Büchel; Institut für Geowissenschaften Uni Mainz, 1994
- Vulkan Rockeskyller Kopf – Flyer der Georoute Gerolsteiner Land (P. Bitschene), 2007
- Cliff S. J. Shaw, Alan B. Woodland, Jens Hopp und Nesha D. Trenholm: Structure and evolution of the Rockeskyllerkopf Volcanic Complex, West Eifel Volcanic Field, Germany in Bulletin of Volcanology (doi:10.1007/s00445-010-0380-9)
