= Kahlheid =

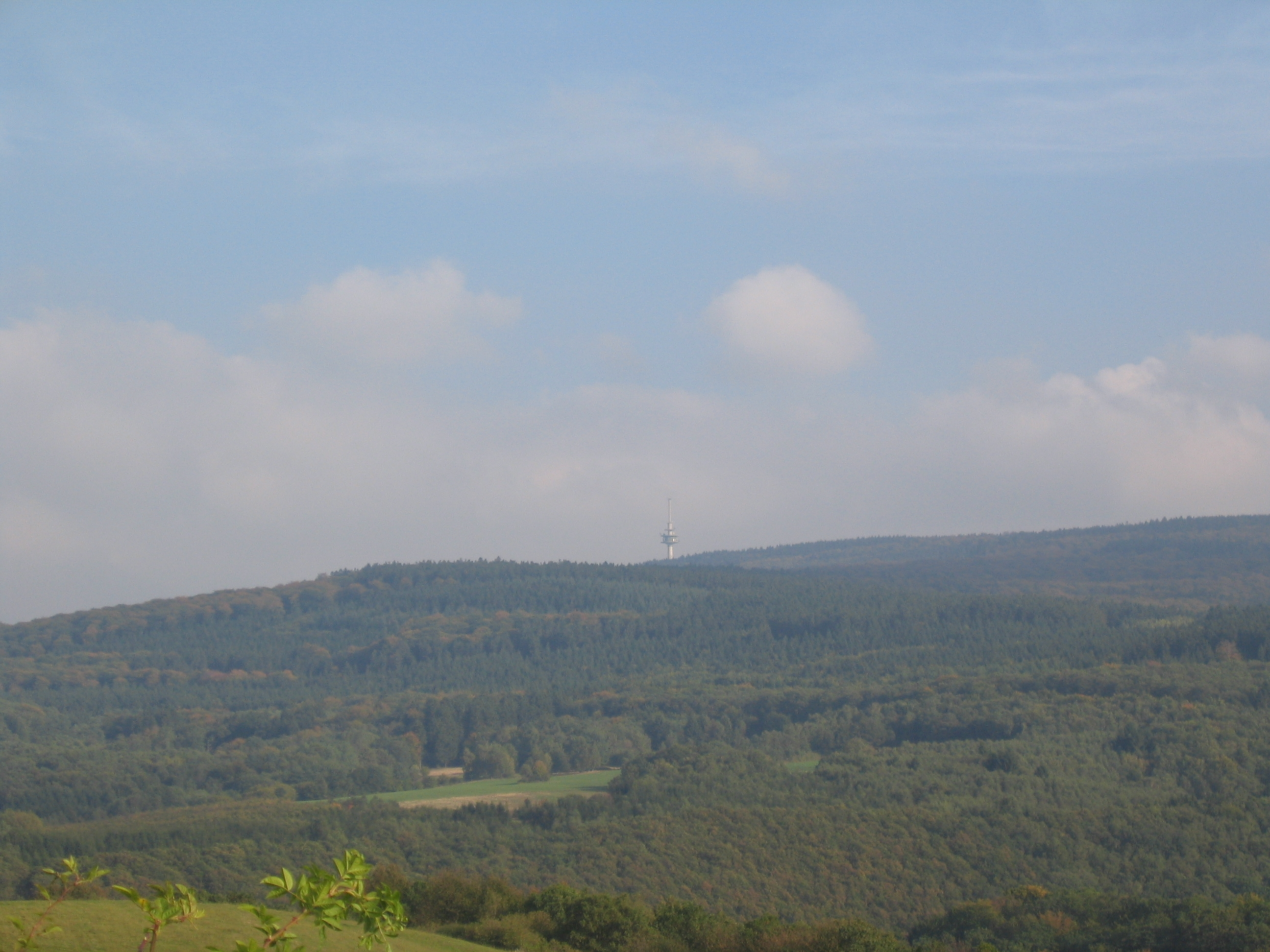
- The Kahlheid with its transmission tower

Highest point
- Elevation: 766 m above sea level (NHN) (2,513.1 ft)
- Coordinates: 49°44′53″N 7°06′49″E

Geography
- Location within Rhineland-Palatinate
- Location: near Morscheid-Riedenburg; counties of Birkenfeld and Bernkastel-Wittlich, Rhineland-Palatinate, Germany
- Parent range: Idar Forest (Hunsrück)

The Kahlheid near Morscheid-Riedenburg in the Idar Forest (Hunsrück) is a mountain, 766 m above sea level (NHN), on the boundary between the counties of Birkenfeld and Bernkastel-Wittlich in the German state of Rhineland-Palatinate.

The mountain is the third highest in Rhineland-Palatinate after the Erbeskopf (816.3 m), 2.6 km to the southwest and its southwestern subpeak, the Springenkopf (784.2 m), in the Schwarzwälder Hochwald, and the peak of An den zwei Steinen (766.2 m), 12 km to the northeast (both distances as the crow flies), also in the Idar Forest.

== See also ==
- List of mountains and hills in Rhineland-Palatinate
