= An den zwei Steinen =

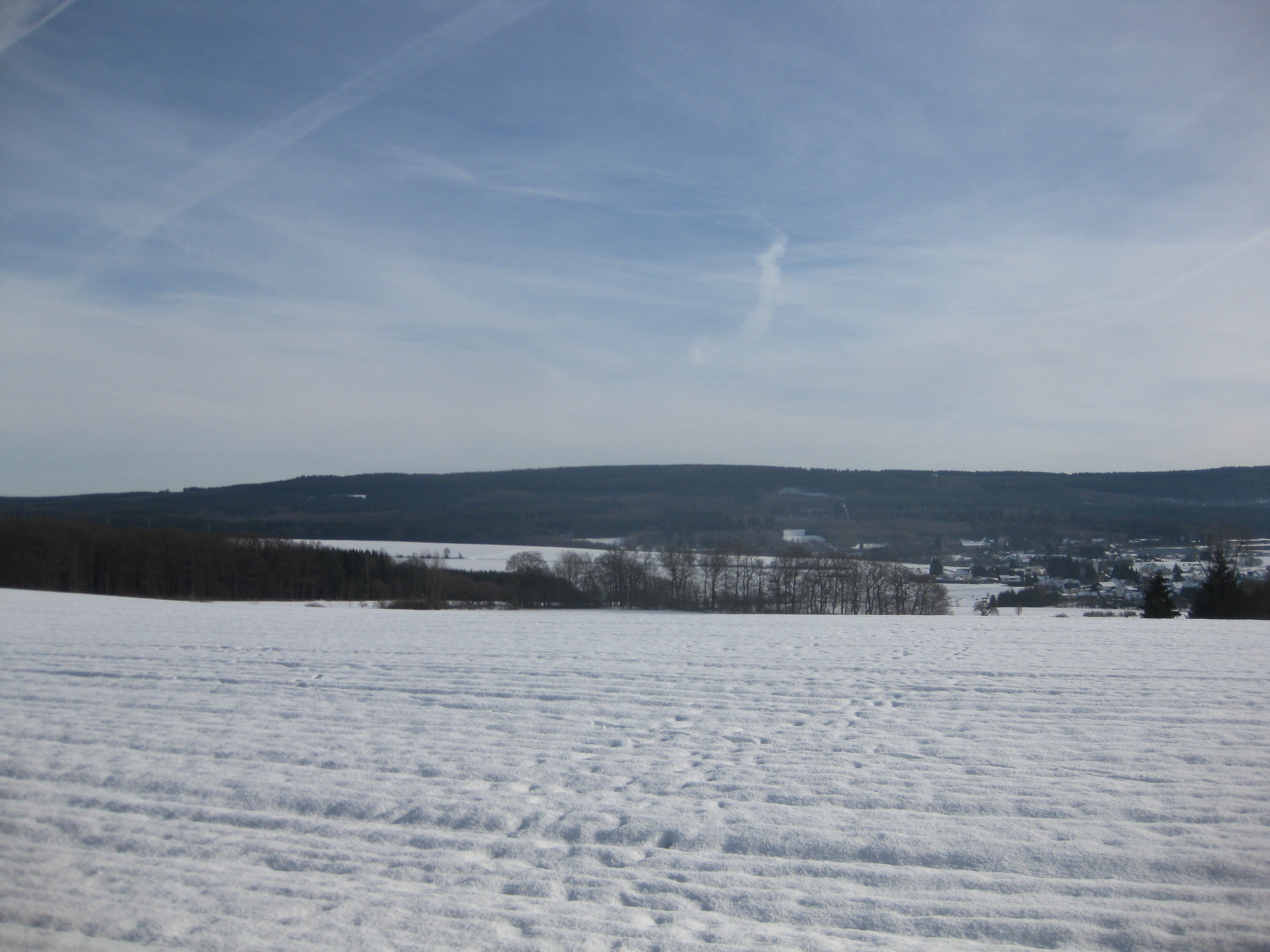
- The main ridge of the Idarwald from the Hunsrückhöhenstraße at the Stumpfen tower

Highest point
- Elevation: 766.2 m above sea level (NHN) (2,514 ft)
- Isolation: 15 km → Erbeskopf
- Coordinates: 49°50′04″N 7°13′35″E

Geography
- Location within Rhineland-Palatinate
- Location: Landkreise Birkenfeld and Bernkastel-Wittlich, Rhineland-Palatinate, Germany
- Parent range: Idarwald, Hunsrück

An den zwei Steinen is a mountain, 766.2 m above sea level (NHN), in the Idar Forest (part of the Hunsrück mountains) in the counties of Birkenfeld and Bernkastel-Wittlich in Rhineland-Palatinate, Germany.

The wooded peak is the second-highest in Rhineland-Palatinate after the Erbeskopf (816.3 m), 15 kilometres to the southwest (with its southwestern spur, the Springenkopf, 784.2 m) in the Schwarzwälder Hochwald, and ahead of the Kahlheid (766.0 m), 12 kilometres southwest, also in the Idar Forest.

Its summit lies on the boundary of Stipshausen to the northeast, Hottenbach to the east-southeast and Hinzerath (part of Morbach) to the northwest; other municipalities nearby are: Hochscheid to the north and Hellertshausen to the southeast.

== See also ==
- List of mountains and hills of Rhineland-Palatinate
