= Eckkopf Tower =

Observation tower in the Palatine Forest of Germany

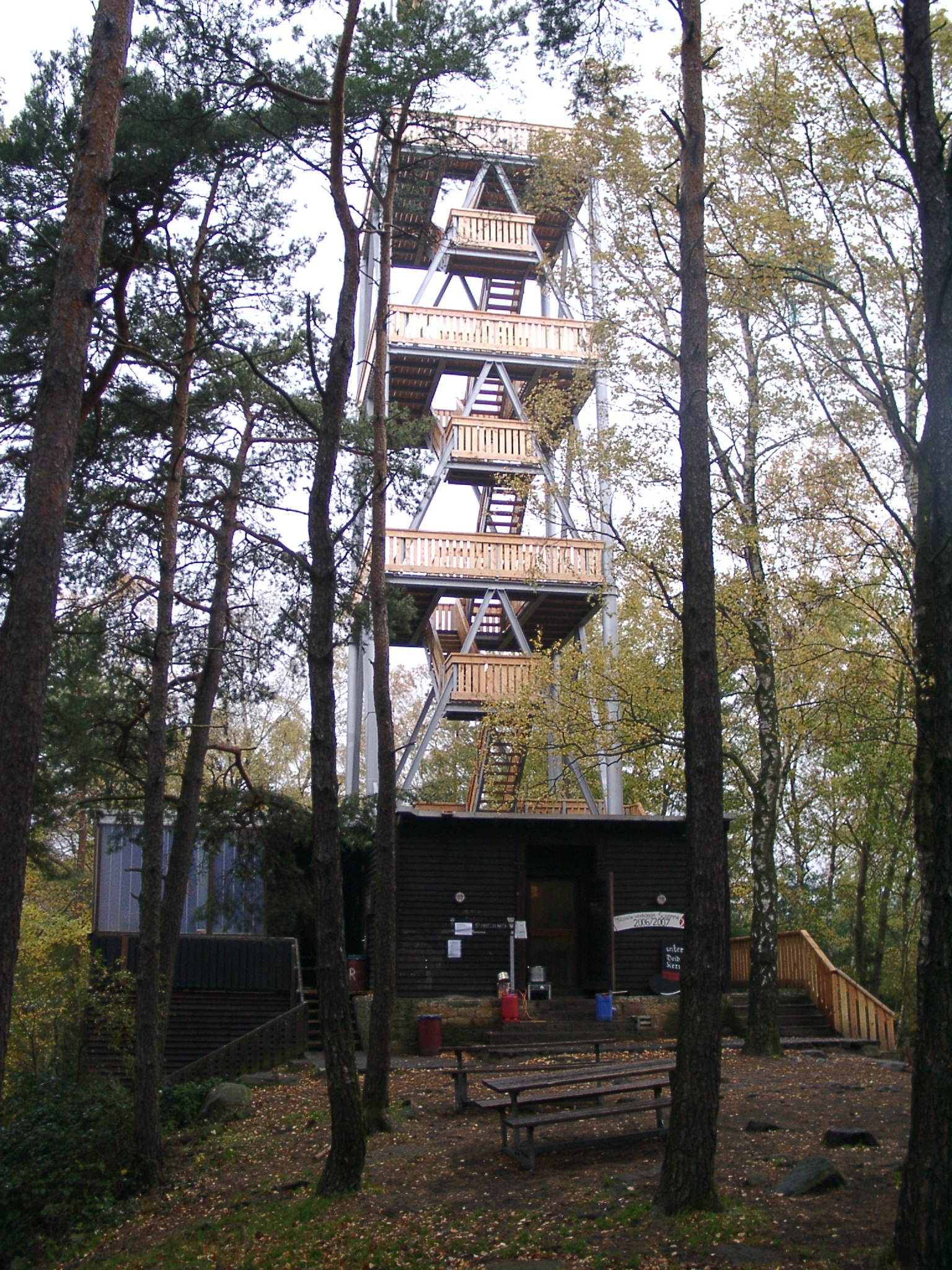
The Eckkopf Tower and restaurant on the Eckkopf

The Eckkopf Tower (German: Eckkopfturm) is a 25-metre-high observation tower on the eponymous Eckkopf (516 m), a major hill in the Palatine Forest of Germany. It has a tubular steel design and was erected in summer 1975 by the Deidesheim municipality. It has an observation height of 541 m above NN and offers a good all-round view – to the west, south and north over the Palatine Forest, and to the east over the Upper Rhine Plain.

The tower had two predecessors. The first was built in 1891 and collapsed in 1920 during a storm. The second, built in 1973, was destroyed by fire. In the vicinity of the tower there is a restaurant.
