= Hohenfels-Essingen =

- Municipality
- Coat of arms

- Location of Hohenfels-Essingen within Vulkaneifel district
- Interactive map of Hohenfels-Essingen
- Location within Germany Location within Rhineland-Palatinate
- Coordinates: 50°15′15″N 6°43′55″E
- Country: Germany
- State: Rhineland-Palatinate
- District: Vulkaneifel
- Municipal assoc.: Gerolstein

Government
  - Mayor (2019–24): Josef Simons

Area
  - Total: 5.02 km^{2} (1.94 sq mi)
- Elevation: 440 m (1,440 ft)

Population (2025-12-31)
  - Total: 344
  - Density: 68.5/km^{2} (177/sq mi)
- Time zone: UTC+01:00 (CET)
  - Summer (DST): UTC+02:00 (CEST)
- Postal codes: 54570
- Dialling codes: 06595
- Vehicle registration: DAU

Hohenfels-Essingen is an Ortsgemeinde – a municipality belonging to a Verbandsgemeinde, a kind of collective municipality – in the Vulkaneifel district in Rhineland-Palatinate, Germany. It belongs to the Verbandsgemeinde of Gerolstein, whose seat is in the like-named town.

== Geography ==
The municipality lies in the Vulkaneifel, a part of the Eifel known for its volcanic history, geographical and geological features, and even ongoing activity today, including gases that sometimes well up from the earth. Hohenfels-Essingen lies in the Hangelsbach valley framed by the Feuerberg (588 m), the Alter Voß (588 m, with “Liberation Beech”) and the Mühlenberg (585 m, with its well-known millstone quarries).

== History ==
As witnessed by archaeological finds, Hohenfels was already settled in Roman and Frankish times and in 948, it had its first documentary mention. Essingen was first mentioned in a document in 1193 as an estate belonging to the Sankt Thomas Monastery.

=== Romans and Franks ===
In the late 2nd century, the Romans came into the west Eifel. Roman troops found natives who worked at cropraising, but who were so small in number that they only occupied a relatively small area. With the systematic opening of the land with military roads and the attendant onset of regional and even national trade opportunities, land clearing was begun in these lands, which were particularly good for cropraising. The land each side of the roads was overlaid with a network of estates that were run both as state and private enterprises. Some of the most important Roman roads ran over the northern heights of Hohenfels and through the Kyll valley north of Trier.

In the district Im Keller (“In the Cellar”) in Hohenfels, the remnants of a portico villa were found during building excavations in 1957. Only about 200 metres away in 1914 in the rural cadastral area Auf Grafenfeld in Hohenfels, two Roman graves were unearthed and salvaged for the Rheinisches Landesmuseum Trier.

The great Germanic taking of the land between 400 and 600 destroyed Roman culture and brought the area into the “army kings’” (Heerkönige) hands. The people who had lived here until now – Romanized Celts and Romans – either fled or were subdued. The Frankish kings dealt the formerly Roman estates out to their warriors. In Hohenfels, an old settlement founded by the Franks can be found right near the Roman portico villa. In Auf Grafenfeld, a great burying ground from Frankish times was unearthed and explored in 1912: 125 Frankish graves from the 4th to 8th centuries.

=== 15th to 17th centuries ===
Even before the Thirty Years' War, the Mühlenberg was riven with galleries in which millstones were being produced. As protection, in particular against Swedish troops, these galleries and caves were expanded and then used to shelter livestock. For a water supply, great basins were hewn in lava blocks, which could hold up to 300 litres of water. Water was to be had from a spring outlet on the mountain’s south slope.

After the Thirty Years’ War, the land had been laid waste and the people impoverished. Moreover, there were sicknesses like the Plague and cholera. From this time come seven wayside crosses hewn from basalt in the vicinity of Hohenfels. Each Sunday, the whole village would make a pilgrimage by the crosses, asking for an end to the Plague. In the 1960s, the crosses were put up by the municipality along the way to the grotto on the Mühlberg. Further destruction was brought in 1688 by the Nine Years' War (known in Germany as the Pfälzischer Erbfolgekrieg, or War of the Palatine Succession), in which castles, churches and monasteries were destroyed.

=== 18th and 19th centuries ===
As a result of the French Revolution, the French came into the Eifel. Hohenfels was then owned by the Count of Metternich, who was stripped of his holdings in 1808. The Hohenfels mill, which also belonged to the Count, was sold for 1,200 francs (then equivalent to 380 Taler). Likewise, each one of the Count's landholdings was auctioned off one by one.

In November 1817, the Eifel was annexed to the state of Prussia and thenceforth belonged to the newly founded Rhine Province with its seat in Düsseldorf. In the 19th century, an average of 140 people lived in Hohenfels. The main livelihood was smallholdings. There were also family businesses in curbstone and millstone making, and in making roadbuilding materials. These products were shipped out over the Eifel by teams of horses and sold. Some of the millstones were shipped to Belgium and thence throughout the world. These family businesses ceased during the First World War.

In 1860, the Eifel's biggest lava deposit – the Feuerberg in Hohenfels – was leased by the municipality for lava mining. The lava was used for road and railway building.

=== 20th century to present ===
Basalt quarry

After the First World War, in November 1918, American troops were in the village. Later on came French occupational troops as part of the Allied occupation of the Rhineland.

In the 1920s, basalt mining began beneath the Mühlenberg. In the area around Hohenfels, a firm from Mayen was making runner stones and shipping them worldwide. In 1928 above the cadastral area of “Wahlend”, a gravelworks was built, remaining in operation until 1974. For a time, more than 100 people were employed here.

In the course of administrative reform, the two self-administering municipalities of Hohenfels and Essingen were merged on 1 January 1968 into a single municipality.

== Politics ==
=== Municipal council ===
The council is made up of 8 council members, who were elected by majority vote at the municipal election held on 7 June 2009, and the honorary mayor as chairman.

=== Coat of arms ===
The German blazon reads: In Silber ein schräglinkes, rotes Schwert, begleitet oben von einer blauen Urne, unten von einem grünen Mühlstein.

The municipality's arms might in English heraldic language be described thus: Argent a sword bendwise sinister gules, the point to chief, between an urn azure and a millstone vert.

The red sword stands for the execution place of the Electoral-Trier Amt of Daun between Hohenfels and Essingen on the old Roman road, marked on the map of the Amt of Daun in 1683 with a gallows symbol. The blue urn refers to the great Frankish burying ground with 125 graves and the important finds therefrom. The green millstone refers to the Hohenfels millstone quarry, already widely known in the Middle Ages, and further for the landscape in both constituent centres, which is characterized by volcanism, and where there is even today lava and basalt quarrying.

== Culture and sightseeing ==
- The grotto at the Mühlenberg
- Millstone caves
- Basalt deposits
- Hiking trails

=== Buildings ===
==== Essingen ====
- Saint Hubert’s Catholic Church (branch church; Filialkirche St. Hubertus), Bergstraße 10, biaxial aisleless church, 1886.
- Bergstraße 1 – Quereinhaus (a combination residential and commercial house divided for these two purposes down the middle, perpendicularly to the street), from 1783, old cobbles in yard.
- Bergstraße 2 – house from 1816, commercial building, some old cobbles in yard, whole complex.
- Wayside cross, southwest of the village on the road to Rockeskyll, cast-iron crucifix, about 1900.
- Wayside cross, west of the village at a hairpin bend in the road, a basalt beam cross from 1749 (?).

==== Hohenfels ====
- Catholic church, Gerolsteiner Straße 6, four-axis Gothic Revival aisleless church from 1894.
- Before Am Mühlenberg 6 – wayside cross, basalt shaft cross from 1687.
- Schulstraße, graveyard, warriors’ memorial 1914–1918, Crucifixion group, praying soldier, from 1922.
- Wayside cross, north of the village at the Mühlenberg at the lower hairpin bend, basalt shaft cross from 1719.

=== Clubs ===
- Freizeit- und Sportverein Hohenfels-Essingen e.V. (sport and leisure)
- Verschönerungsverein Hohenfels-Essingen 1895 e.V. (beautification)
- Riding club
- Möhnenclub (Carnival group)

== Transport ==
Hohenfels train stop is located at Cross Eifel Railway although right now it is out of service.
