= Eckkopf =

Hill in the Palatine Forest in Germany

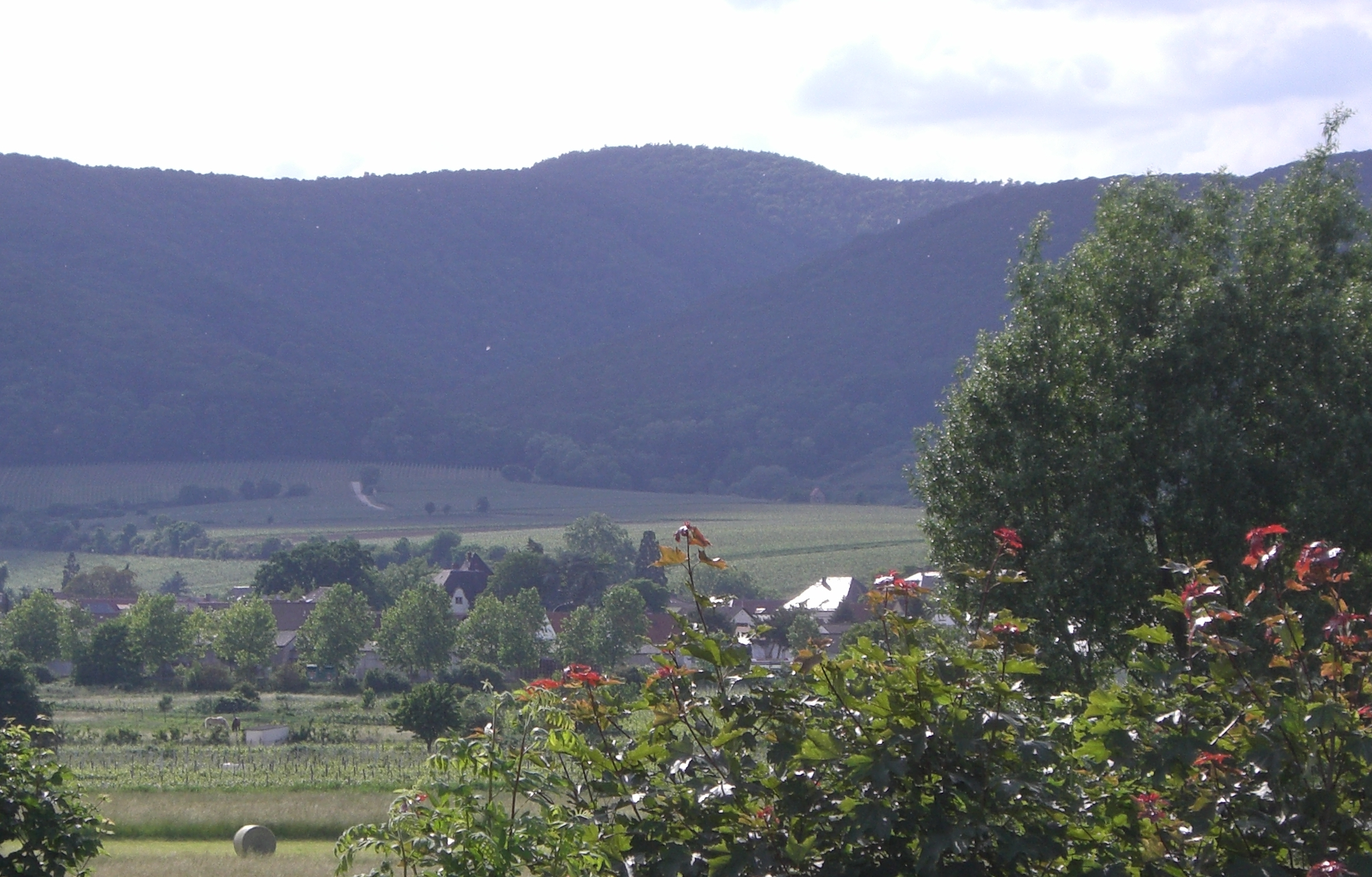
- The Eckkopf (centre), photographed from Deidesheim

Highest point
- Elevation: 516 m above sea level (NN) (1,693 ft)
- Coordinates: 49°24′57″N 8°08′17″E

Geography
- Location within Rhineland-Palatinate
- Location: Rhineland-Palatinate, Germany (observation tower (25 m))
- Parent range: Palatine Forest

The Eckkopf is a 516-metre-high (1,693 ft) hill in the Palatine Forest in the German state of Rhineland-Palatinate. It lies about 3 km west of the small Palatine town of Deidesheim in the Haardt, as the eastern edge of the Palatine Forest is called. It has a 25-metre-high (82 ft) observation tower called the Eckkopf Tower (Eckkopfturm).

By the tower is an inn, which is open on most weekends during the year and on several public holidays. It is managed by the various voluntary organisations of the collective municipality of Deidesheim. The task is shared amongst the organisations by the municipality. Each organization has to pay a charge for the right to manage the inn that is used by the municipality for its maintenance.

On 27 February 1982 the federal president, Karl Carstens, visited the hill as part of his national hikes and was accompanied by the minister-president of Rhineland-Palatinate, Bernhard Vogel.
