= Rockeskyll =

- Municipality
- Coat of arms

- Location of Rockeskyll within Vulkaneifel district
- Interactive map of Rockeskyll
- Location within Germany Location within Rhineland-Palatinate
- Coordinates: 50°15′19″N 6°41′54″E
- Country: Germany
- State: Rhineland-Palatinate
- District: Vulkaneifel
- Municipal assoc.: Gerolstein

Government
  - Mayor (2019–24): Marcel Ballmann

Area
  - Total: 5.88 km^{2} (2.27 sq mi)
- Elevation: 380–577 m (1,247–1,893 ft)

Population (2025-12-31)
  - Total: 264
  - Density: 44.9/km^{2} (116/sq mi)
- Time zone: UTC+01:00 (CET)
  - Summer (DST): UTC+02:00 (CEST)
- Postal codes: 54570
- Dialling codes: 06591
- Vehicle registration: DAU
- Website: www.rockeskyll.de

Rockeskyll is an Ortsgemeinde – a municipality belonging to a Verbandsgemeinde, a kind of collective municipality – in the Vulkaneifel district in Rhineland-Palatinate, Germany. It belongs to the Verbandsgemeinde of Gerolstein, whose seat is in the like-named town.

== Geography ==
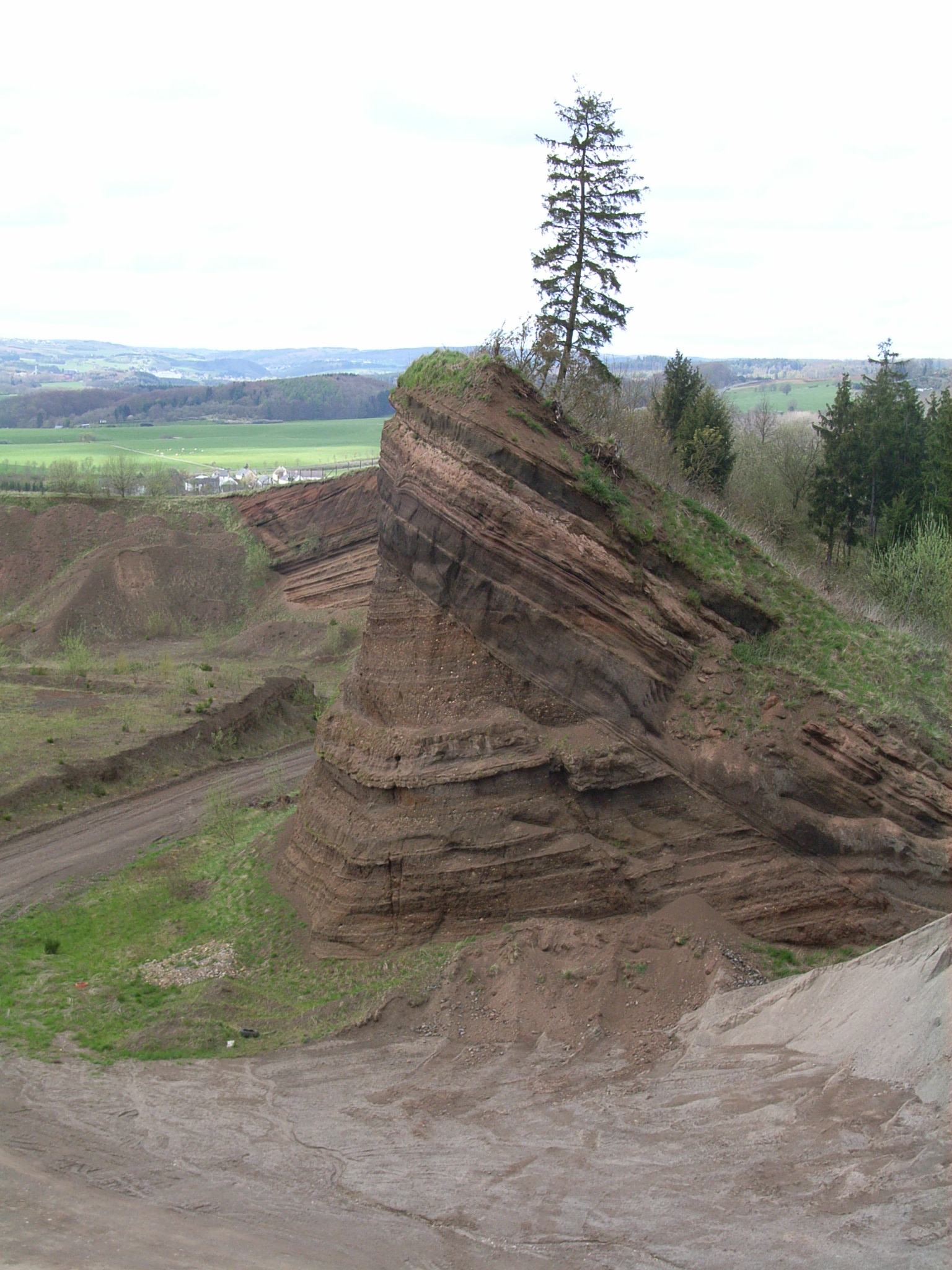
Volcanic layering on the Rockeskyller Kopf

The municipality lies in the Vulkaneifel, a part of the Eifel known for its volcanic history, geographical and geological features, and even ongoing activity today, including gases that sometimes well up from the earth.

The municipality’s landmark is the Rockeskyller Kopf, a stratovolcano in the heart of the Vulkaneifel, which stretches from the Belgian border to the Moselle. Southwest of Rockeskyll flows the river Kyll, a tributary to the Moselle and the longest river in the Eifel.

== History ==
In 1098, Kila had its first documentary mention in a donation document. In 1511, a Gothic church with columnar supports was built. This church is a highly ranked cultural monument and stands as a protected cultural property according to the Hague Convention for the Protection of Cultural Property in the Event of Armed Conflict. Until the end of feudal times, Rockeskyll belonged to the Electorate of Trier. In 1795, the tithing domain of Rockeskyll became a mairie (“mayoralty”) during the time of French rule. Besides Rockeskyll itself, this mairie included Berlingen, Betteldorf, Bewingen, Essingen, Gees, Hinterweiler, Hohenfels, Pelm and Roth. In 1815, Rockeskyll became the seat of a Prussian Bürgermeisterei (“mayoralty”). In 1858, the Bürgermeistereien of Gerolstein and Rockeskyll were merged into the Amt of Gerolstein. Since 1970, Rockeskyll has been part of the Verbandsgemeinde of Gerolstein in the Vulkaneifel district.

== Politics ==
=== Municipal council ===
The council is made up of 6 council members, who were elected by majority vote at the municipal election held on 7 June 2009, and the honorary mayor as chairman.

=== Mayor ===
Rockeskyll’s mayor is Marcel Ballmann.

=== Coat of arms ===
The German blazon reads: Von Blau über Silber geteilt, oben eine goldene Waage, unten ein aus je drei roten Fäden gebildetes Gitterkreuz.

The municipality’s arms might in English heraldic language be described thus: Per fess azure balances Or and argent a cross triple parted gules.

Rockeskyll’s location between Hillesheim and Gerolstein ensured its importance through the ages as a market centre. This is symbolized in the arms by the charge above the line of partition, balances such as those traditionally used at markets. The other charge is a cross meant to resemble those on the capitals of some of the columns in Rockeskyll’s old church. The tinctures below the line of partition are those once borne by the Electorate of Trier, and are thus yet another historical reference.

== Culture and sightseeing ==
Buildings:

- Saint Bartholomew’s Catholic Parish Church (Pfarrkirche St. Bartholomäus), Hauptstraße 41 – Romanesque west tower, original Late Gothic columned hall, 1511, expanded in 1840, new vaulting built above two middle columns in 1891, missionary cross from 1736.
- Dorfstraße 39 – representative Baroque building with mansard roof, about 1800, second dwelling wing, stately commercial building, yard, garden with quarrystone retaining wall, whole complex.
- Hauptstraße – wayside chapel, plastered building, 18th/19th century.
- Hauptstraße – Stations of the Cross, seven stations of a Way of the Cross with sandstone reliefs, about 1750 or 1760.
- Hauptstraße 29 – upper part of a former Station of the Cross, mid-18th century.
- Hauptstraße 31 – estate along the street, elders’ residence/bakehouse (?), from 1786.
- Hauptstraße 43 – five-axis house of an estate along the street, about 1800.
- Hauptstraße 44 – Quereinhaus (a combination residential and commercial house divided for these two purposes down the middle, perpendicularly to the street) with broad frontage.
- Im Überecken 7 – former rectory (?), building with half-hipped roof, angularly designed commercial buildings
- Im Überecken 17 – corner estate, about 1800.
- Graveyard, northeast of the village – cross, altarlike base, Gothic Revival finial cross, about 1900.
- Heiligenhäuschen (a small, shrinelike structure consecrated to a saint or saints) north of the village on the edge of a wooded mountain knoll – base with Rococo leafwork, from 1774, niche upper part, remnant of a finial cross.
- Wayside cross, west of the village on the edge of the woods – red sandstone shaft cross from 1738.
- Wayside cross, east of the village near the way to Essingen – niche cross from 1616.
- Wayside cross, on a farm lane southwest of the village – red sandstone shaft cross from 1775.

== Economy and infrastructure ==
Rockeskyll lies right on Bundesstraße 410. Landesstraße (State Road) 27 runs through the village. In Rockeskyll, a distillery, the Rockeskyller Brennerei, has been in operation since 1842 making liqueurs and spirits such as Eifel-Vulkan 50%, Eifel-Zwerg 42%, Eifel-Hexe 30%, Eifel-Schlehwittchen 25% and others.
