= Herrmannsberg (North Palatine Uplands) =

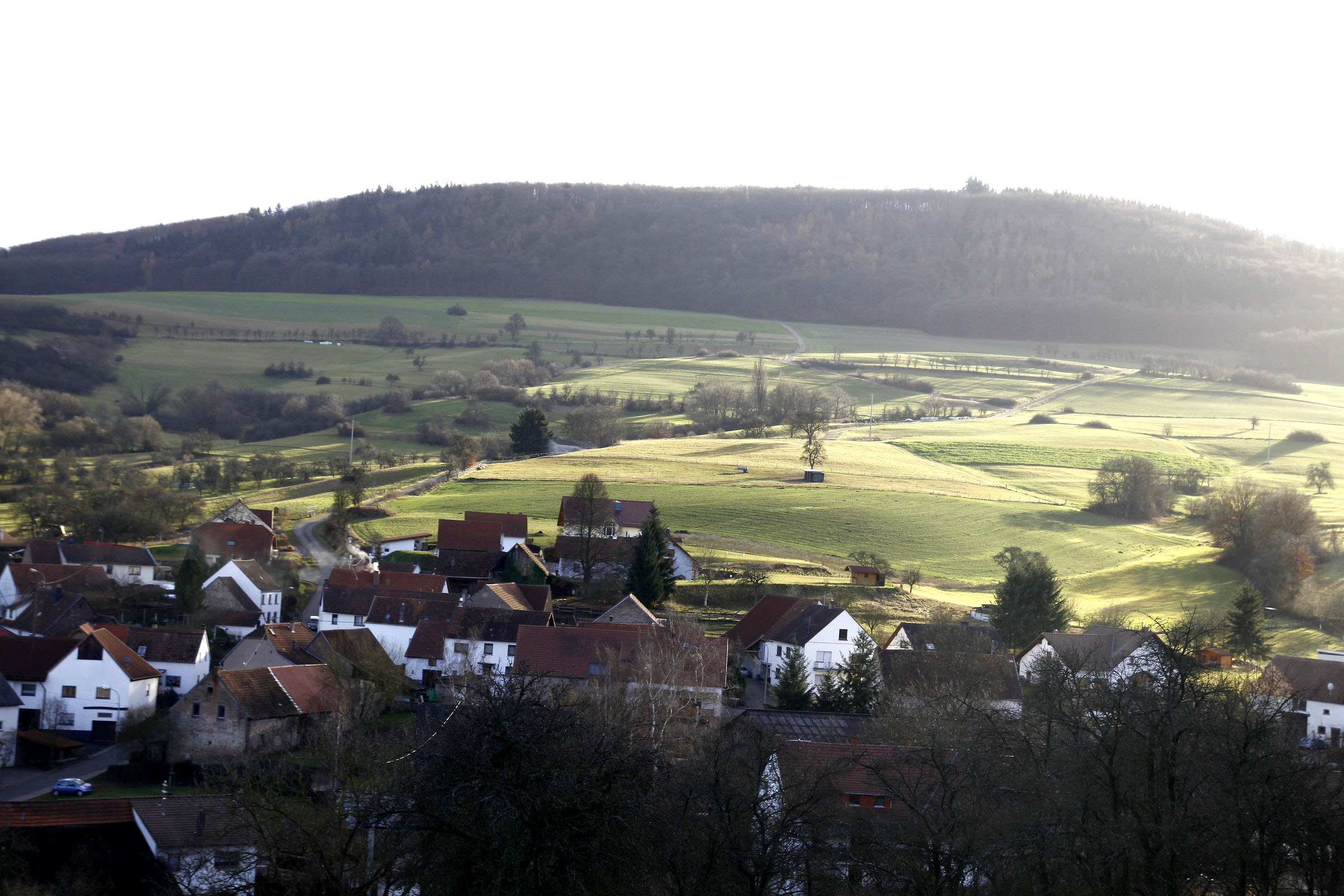

Highest point
- Elevation: 536 m above sea level (NN) (1,759 ft)
- Coordinates: 49°34′23″N 7°31′24″E

Geography
- Location within Rhineland-Palatinate
- Location: Kusel, Rhineland-Palatinate
- Parent range: North Palatine Uplands

The Herrmannsberg is a hill, 536 metres hill, in the county of Kusel in the German state of Rhineland-Palatinate. It is part of the North Palatine Uplands. In the southeast it is adjoined by the Bornberg. Nearby villages are the "Herrmannsberg communities" of Welchweiler, Elzweiler and Horschbach as well as Hinzweiler, Oberweiler im Tal and Eßweiler.

The Trans-Europe Natural Gas Pipeline, which was built in 1972 and extended in 2003, runs over the Herrmannsberg from the Netherlands to Italy.
