= Ernstberg =

Ernstberg / Erresberg
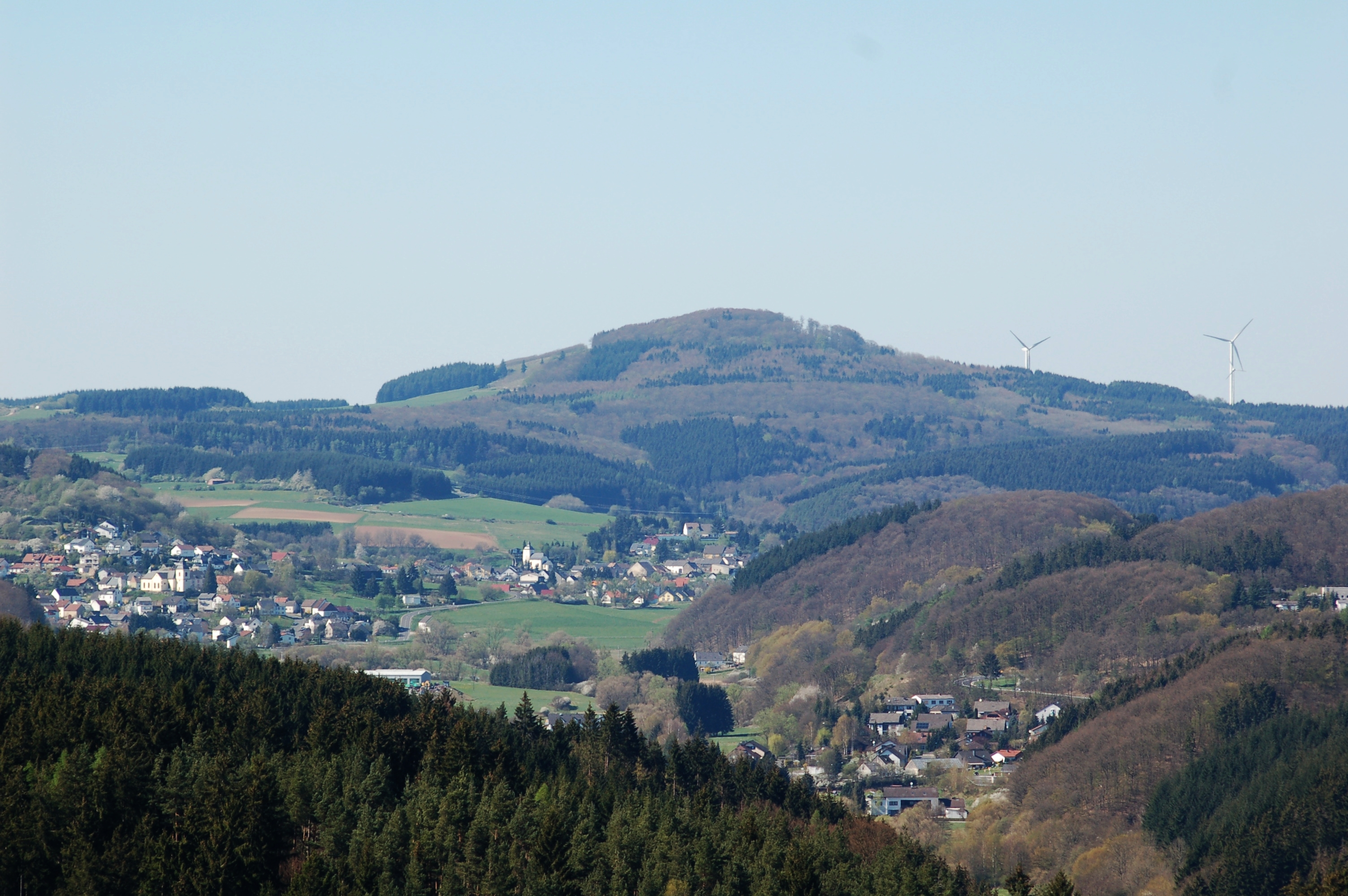
- Ernstberg, seen from the foot of the Mäuseberg by Weinfelder Maar

Highest point
- Elevation: 698.8 m above sea level (NN) (2,293 ft)
- Coordinates: 50°13′49″N 6°46′09″E

Geography
- Location within Rhineland-Palatinate
- Location: Rhineland-Palatinate, Germany
- Parent range: Eifel

The Ernstberg (also Erresberg) southeast of Hinterweiler is, at 698.8 m, the highest of the west Eifel volcanoes and, after the Hohe Acht, the second highest mountain in the Eifel overall. Its summit consists of pyroclastic rocks (Schweißschlacken) that form a volcanic crater that is open towards the east. This is where the basalt masses flowed out, forming a semicircle on the eastern slope of the mountain. It lies within the Waldeifel region.

In winter there are excellent winter sports conditions on the Ernstberg due to its height. Cut langlauf tracks, a toboggan slope and ski hire hut are available.

Somewhat below the summit is a cave that runs through to the other side of the mountain and which is a natural monument. The cave entrances are barred to prevent access.

== Nature reserve ==
On 20 September 1978, the Ernstberg was designated by the district council at Trier as a nature reserve. Its conservation aim is the preservation of the Early Pleistocene stratovolcano with its distinctive ring-shaped arrangement of its pyroclastic rock and basalt layers (Einlagerungen) (nepheline-leutzitite). In addition the aim is to preserve the colony of Perennial Honesty (Lunaria rediviva).
