= Großer Eyberg =

Mountain in Palatine Forest, Germany

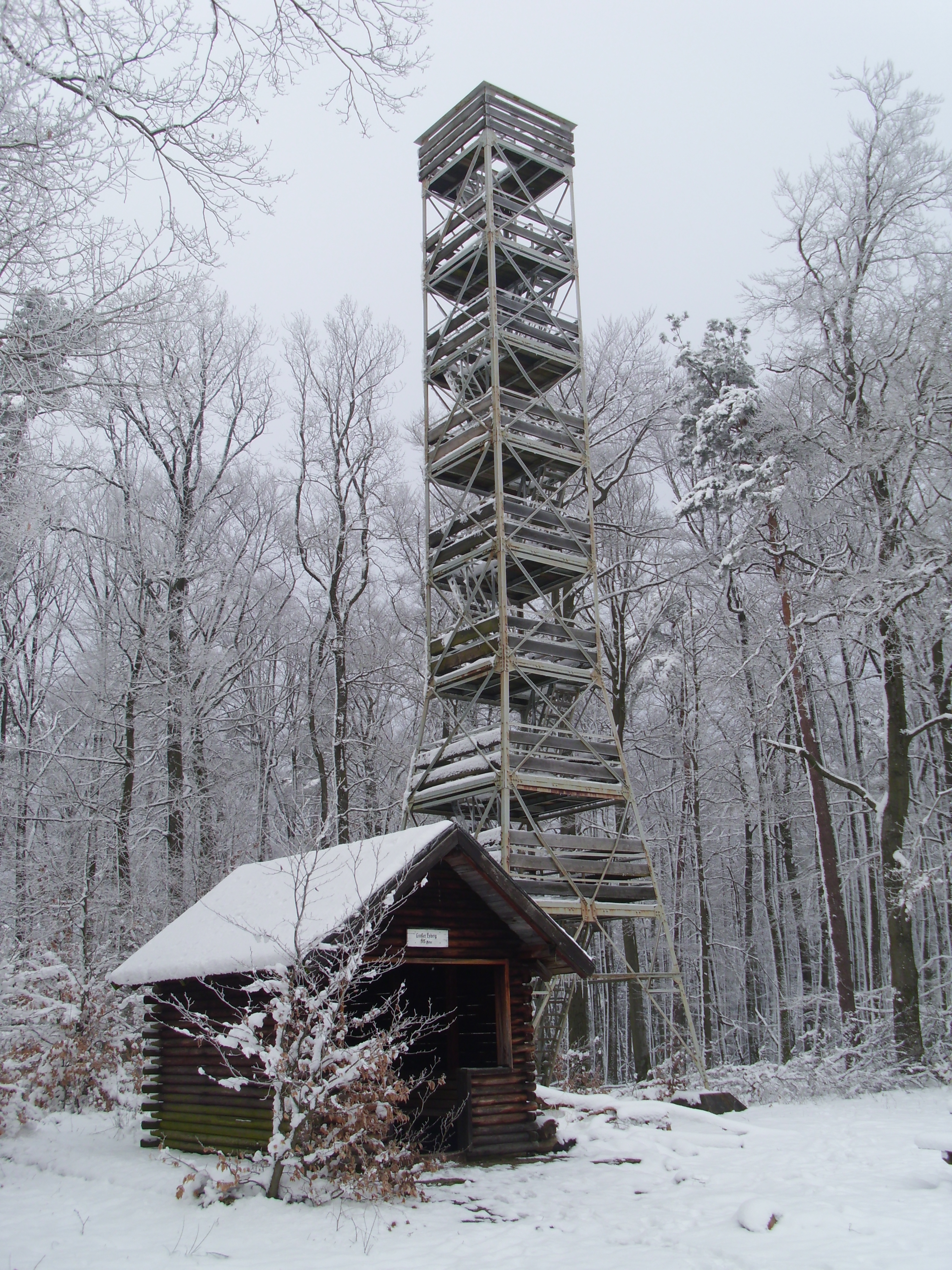
- Steel lattice tower and refuge hut near the summit

Highest point
- Elevation: 513 m above sea level (NN) (1,683 ft)
- Coordinates: 49°07′27″N 7°44′57″E

Geography
- Location within Rhineland-Palatinate
- Location: Dahner Felsenland, Rhineland-Palatinate, Germany (Observation tower on the summit; panoramic view, especially to the south)
- Parent range: Palatine Forest → Wasgau

Geology
- Rock age: 251–243 million years ago
- Mountain type: Conical hill
- Rock type(s): Rock units of the Lower Bunter sandstone (Rehberg and Schlossberg beds)

The Großer Eyberg is a 513-metre-high (1,683 ft) hill in the southern Palatine Forest in Germany. It lies in the county of Südwestpfalz in the borough of Dahn in an area known as the Dahner Felsenland, a part of the Wasgau. This region which comprises the southern part of the Palatine Forest and the northern part of the Vosges Mountains. It is the highest hill in the western Wasgau.

At the summit of the Eyberg is an 18-metre-high, observation tower, of steel lattice construction, built between 1945 and 1949 by the French Army. The tower can only be accessed over unmetalled hiking trails.
