= Idarkopf Tower =

- Idarkopfturm
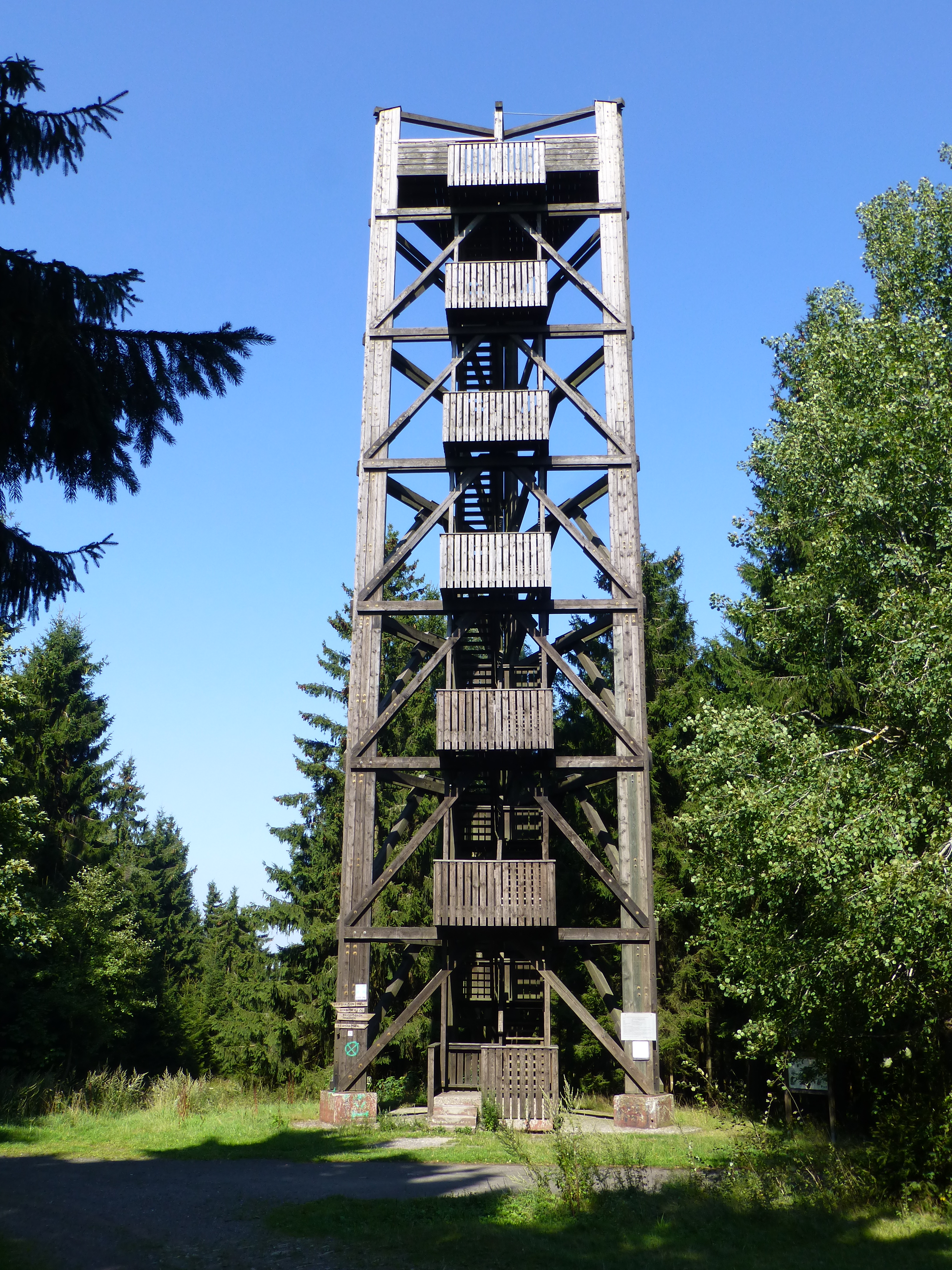
- The Idarkopf Tower (2015)

- Location within Germany

General information
- Status: Completed
- Type: Wooden lattice observation tower
- Location: Idarkopf Mountain, Hunsrück, Idar Forest, Bernkastel-Wittlich/Birkenfeld/Trier-Saarburg, Rhineland-Palatinate, Germany
- Coordinates: 49°51′42.35″N 7°16′19.92″E
- Construction started: 2022
- Completed: 2022
- Opening: 2022

Height
- Height: 31 m (102 ft)

Idarkopf Tower (German: Idarkopf Turm or Idarkopfturm), also known as Idarkopf Observation Tower (German: Idarkopf Aussichtsturm) for long, is a wooden German lattice observation tower on the summit of Mt. Idarkopf in the state of Rhineland-Palatinate. The observation tower on the 746 m-high (2,448 ft) mountain of Idarkopf has a total height of 28.50 m (94 ft). Built in 1980, the tower was constructed according to a certain kind of specialized wooden frame and was designed through triangular sketch. Staircases are uncountable because of the vast number of steps. The roof, which contains the observation deck, is considered the highest accessible point in the whole area, providing a unique view of the town nearby.

The hybrid construction made of wood and steel was erected in 2022 in place of the older wooden tower that was severely damaged by fire in October 2018 and demolished in February 2022. The opening of the new tower took place in December 2022.

== History ==
The Idarkopf Tower's construction was both commenced and finished in 1980, specifically built for observation on top of the Idarkopf mountain. Sources prove that the Idarkopf Tower replaced an older tower, used during both first and second world wars as an observation tower and as a watchtower for the German artillery.

== Geography ==
The Idarkopf Tower stands on the summit of the 746 m-high (2,448 ft) mountain of Idarkopf, a tall mountain included in the low mountain range of the Hunsrück in Idar Forest, which in turn lies in the municipalities of Morbach, Rhaunen, Idar-Oberstein and Kempfeld, which are all in the districts (kreis) of Bernkastel-Wittlich, Birkenfeld, and Trier-Saarburg, all located in the state of Rhineland-Palatinate, in Germany.

Standing on several municipalities, the Idarkopf is surrounded by numerous hotels, residential apartments, parks, outdoor sports facilities, and other famous landmarks.

=== Hunsrück ===
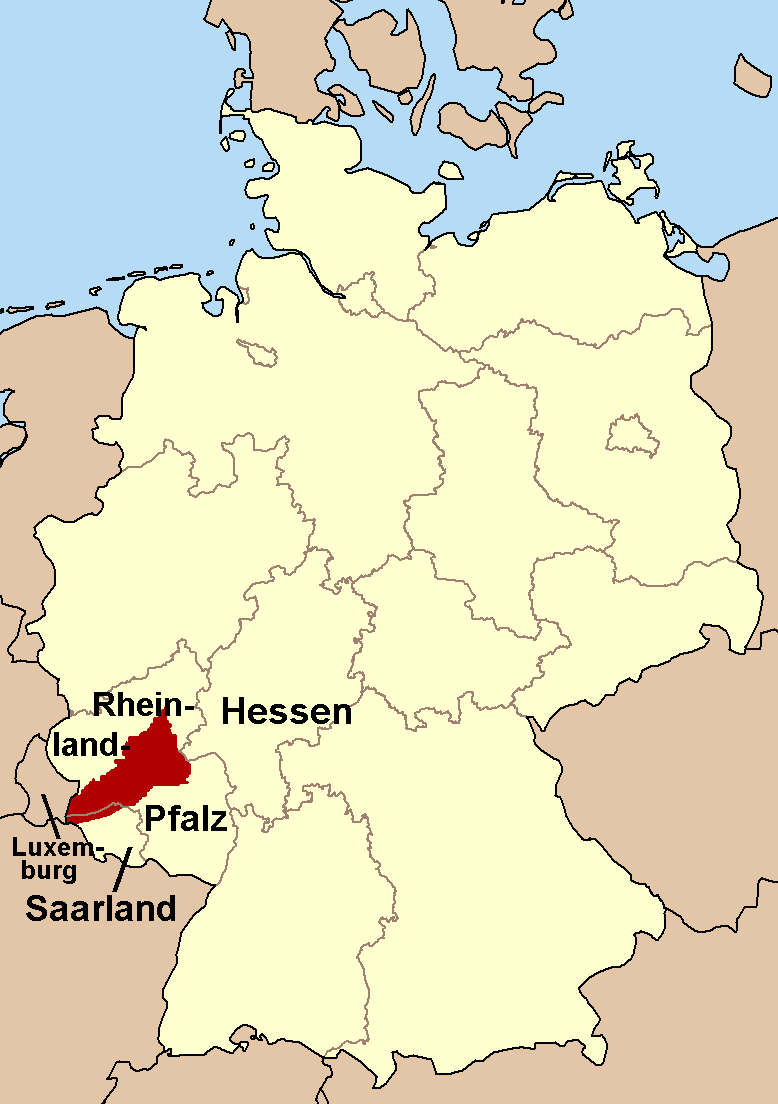
The Hunsrück's geographical location in Germany.

The Hunsrück is a low mountain range in Rhineland-Palatinate, Germany. It is bounded by the river valleys of the Moselle (north), the Nahe (south), and the Rhine (east). The Hunsrück is continued by the Taunus mountains on the eastern side of the Rhine. In the north behind the Moselle, it is continued by the Eifel. To the south of the Nahe, the Palatinate is to be found.

Many of the hills are no higher than 400 m (1,312 ft). There are several chains of higher peaks within the Hunsrück, all bearing names on their own: the (Black Forest) Hochwald, the Idar Forest, the Soonwald, and the Bingen Forest. The highest peak is the Erbeskopf (816 m).

=== Idar Forest ===
The Idar Forest (German: Idarwald, Celtic: "id ar" - hill forest above the land) is a major German forest, part of the Hunsrück low mountain range in the German federal state of Rhineland-Palatinate, Germany.

==== Towns ====
- Simmern
- Kirchberg
- Bernkastel-Kues
- Kastellaun
- Idar-Oberstein

==== Municipalities ====
- Morbach
- Rhaunen
- Kempfeld
- Stipshausen

==== Districts ====
- Bernkastel-Wittlich
- Birkenfeld
- Trier-Saarburg

== See also ==
- Lattice tower
- Observation tower
- Idar Forest
- Atzelberg Tower
