= Bornberg (Palatinate) =

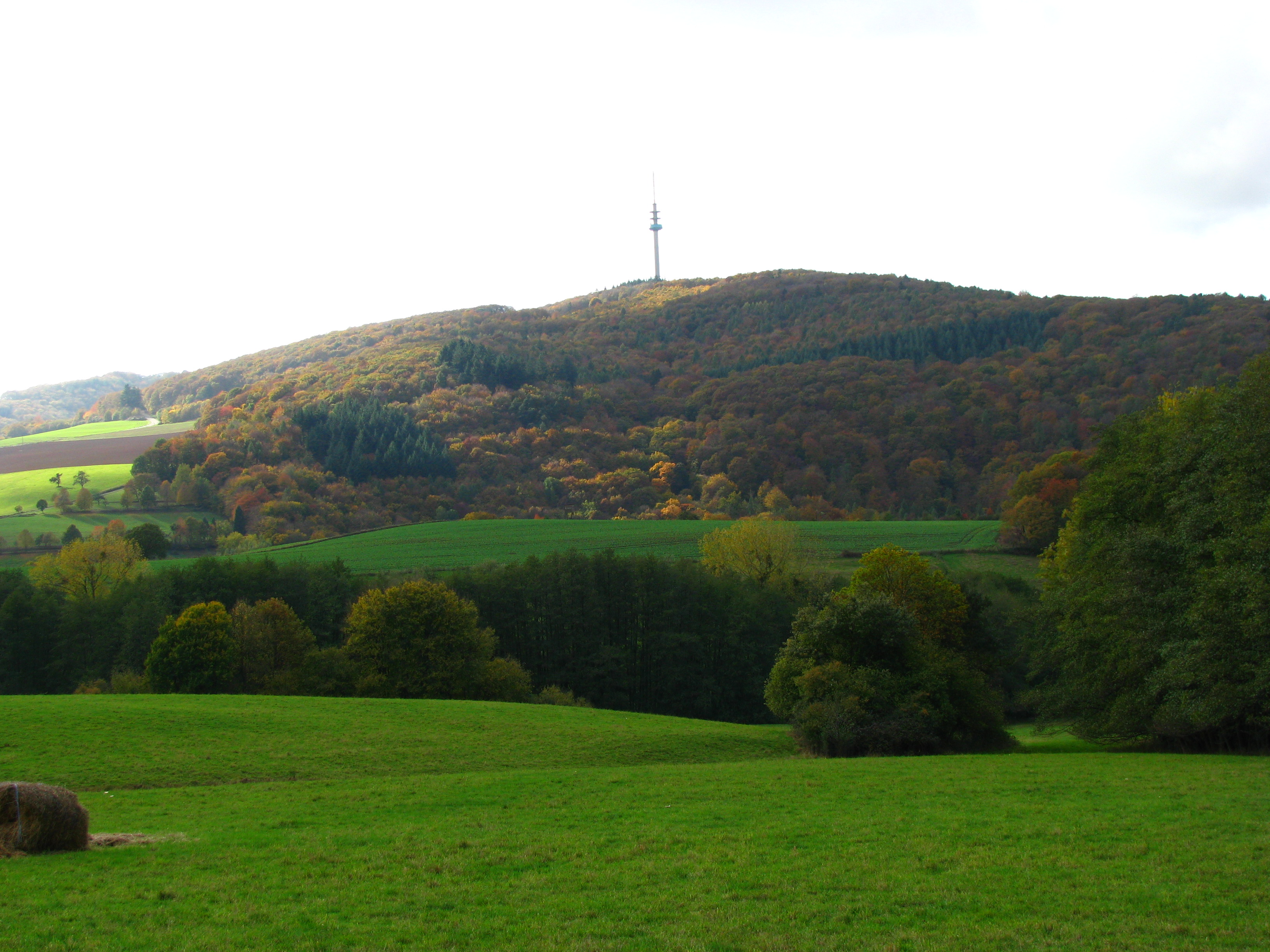
- The Bornberg from the NE

Highest point
- Elevation: 520 m above sea level (NN) (1,710 ft)
- Listing: 151-metre-high telecommunication tower, country rubbish tip, solar farm
- Coordinates: 49°33′30″N 07°31′48″E

Geography
- Location within Rhineland-Palatinate
- Location: Kusel, Rhineland-Palatinate
- Parent range: North Palatine Uplands

Geology
- Rock type: Kuselite

The Bornberg is a 520-metre-high hill in the county of Kusel in the North Palatine Uplands in Germany. The Bornberg has 2 summits: the Kiefernkopf and Trautmannsberg. In the northwest it is adjoined by the Herrmannsberg. To the east flows the Talbach, to the southeast, the Jettenbach and, to the west, the Reichenbach. Nearby villages are Oberweiler im Tal, Eßweiler, Jettenbach and Bosenbach. On the Bornberg is the Schneeweiderhof, a hamlet which is part of Eßweiler.

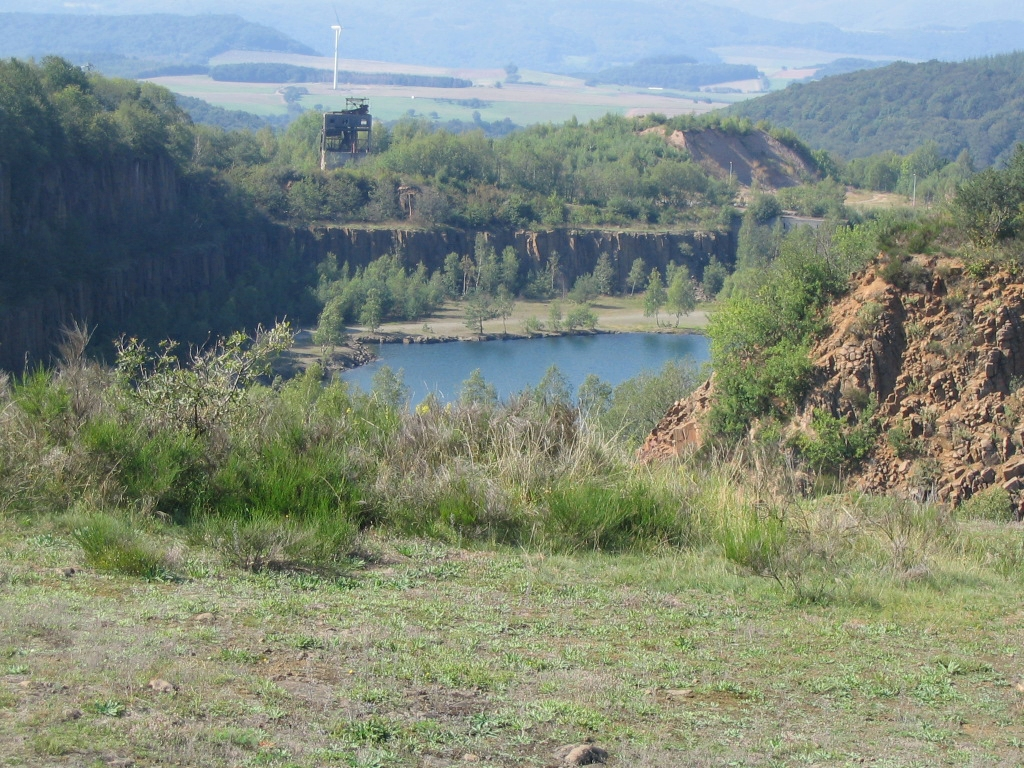
Old quarry on the Bornberg

From 1840 several quarries were established on the Bornberg. They were owned from 1914 by Basalt AG, Linz am Rhein and were worked until 1970. Closely linked with the quarries is the Schneeweiderhof, a hamlet in the parish of Eßweiler, where many of the quarrymen lived. In 1924 a worker's settlement, the Kolonie, was built at Schneeweiderhof which still exists today. Between 1952 and 1965 it even had its own school.

In 1988, Kusel sited its county rubbish tip in the old quarries. In 2005, Meteomedia AG's Eßweiler weather station was established here as well. In November 2008, a solar farm was built next to the rubbish tip on the site of the old green waste area covering four hectares and generating 1.5 MW. It is operated by Neue Energie Pfälzer Bergland, a cooperative venture between Pfalzwerke AG and the county of Kusel.

On the Bornberg there is also a 151-metre-high tower, the Bornberg Telecommunication Tower, owned by Deutsche Telekom which is used to broadcast several radio programmes (VHF and DAB). In 1972 a natural gas pipeline was built, running over the Bornberg from the Netherlands to Italy.

In 2002, prior to the expansion of the gas pipeline, a rescue excavation was carried out on the southern hillside of the Bornberg between Eßweiler, Jettenbach and Bosenbach, as a result of which a Roman estate farm and traces of Celtic settlement were found.
