= Idar Forest =

Forest in Germany

Coordinates: 49.817°N 7.107°E

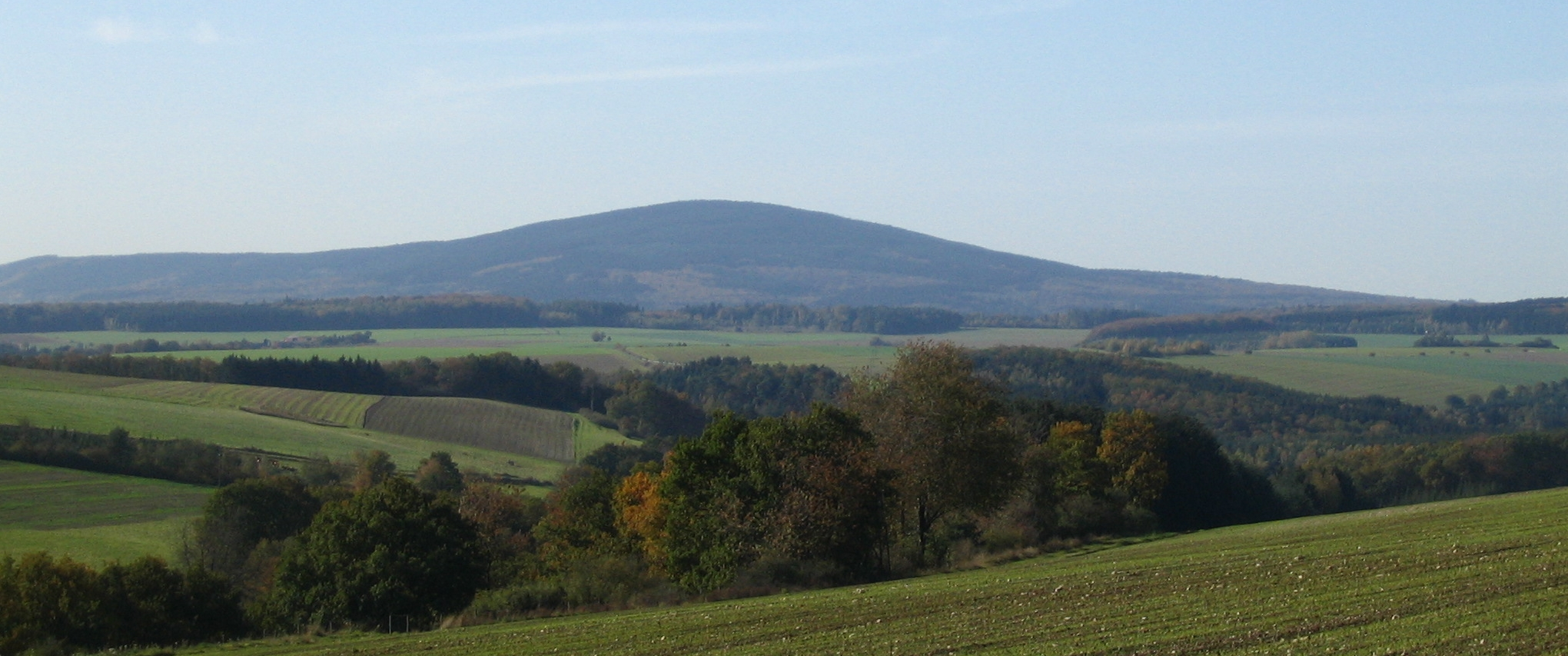
The Idarkopf, one of the low mountains in the Idar Forest

The Idar Forest (German: Idarwald, Celtic: "id ar" - hill forest above the land) is part of the Hunsrück low mountain range in the German federal state of Rhineland-Palatinate, Germany.

== Geography ==
The Idar Forest lies in the districts of Bernkastel-Wittlich and Birkenfeld in the northeast of the Saar-Hunsrück Nature Park. It lies more or less in the triangle formed by the villages of Morbach (in the northwest), Rhaunen (northeast) and Idar-Oberstein (southeast), but apart from Morbach – does not extend as far as these places. The underlying rocks are primarily made up of Lower Devonian quartzites.

== Mountains ==
Amongst the highest mountains in the Idar Forest are:

- An den zwei Steinen (766 m)
- Kahlheid (766 m)
- Steingerüttelkopf (757 m)
- Ruppelstein (755 m)
- Idarkopf (746 m) - crowned by the Idarkopf Tower
- Usarkopf (724 m)

== Bodies of water ==
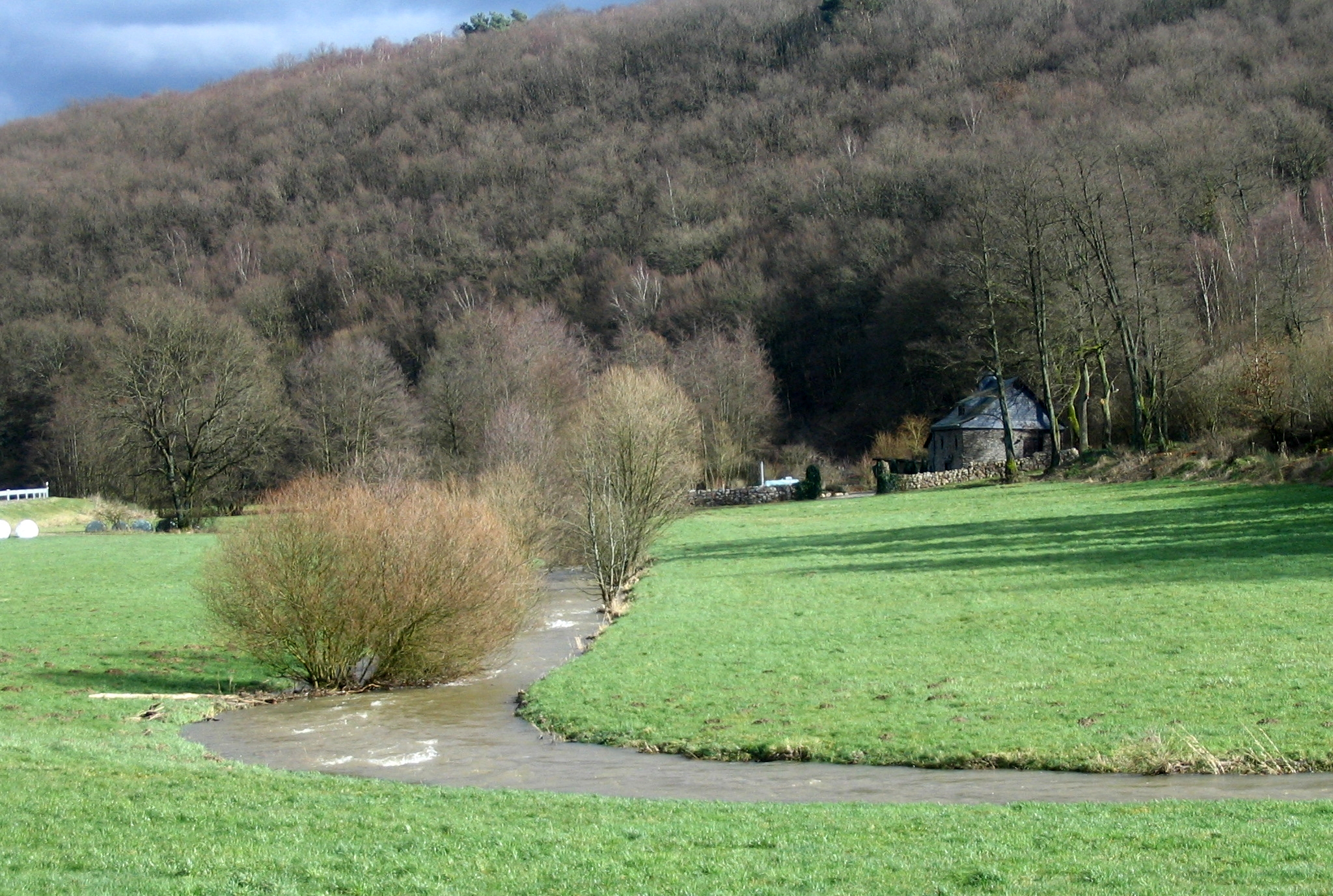
The Idarbach

=== Streams ===
The following streams rise in, or on the edge of, the Idar Forest:

- Dhron
- Idarbach (Nahe) - rises between Erbeskopf and Kahlheid
- Idarbach (Hahnenbach) - rises north of the Idarkopf near Hochscheid
- Rhaunelbach
- Steinbach

=== Lakes and reservoirs ===
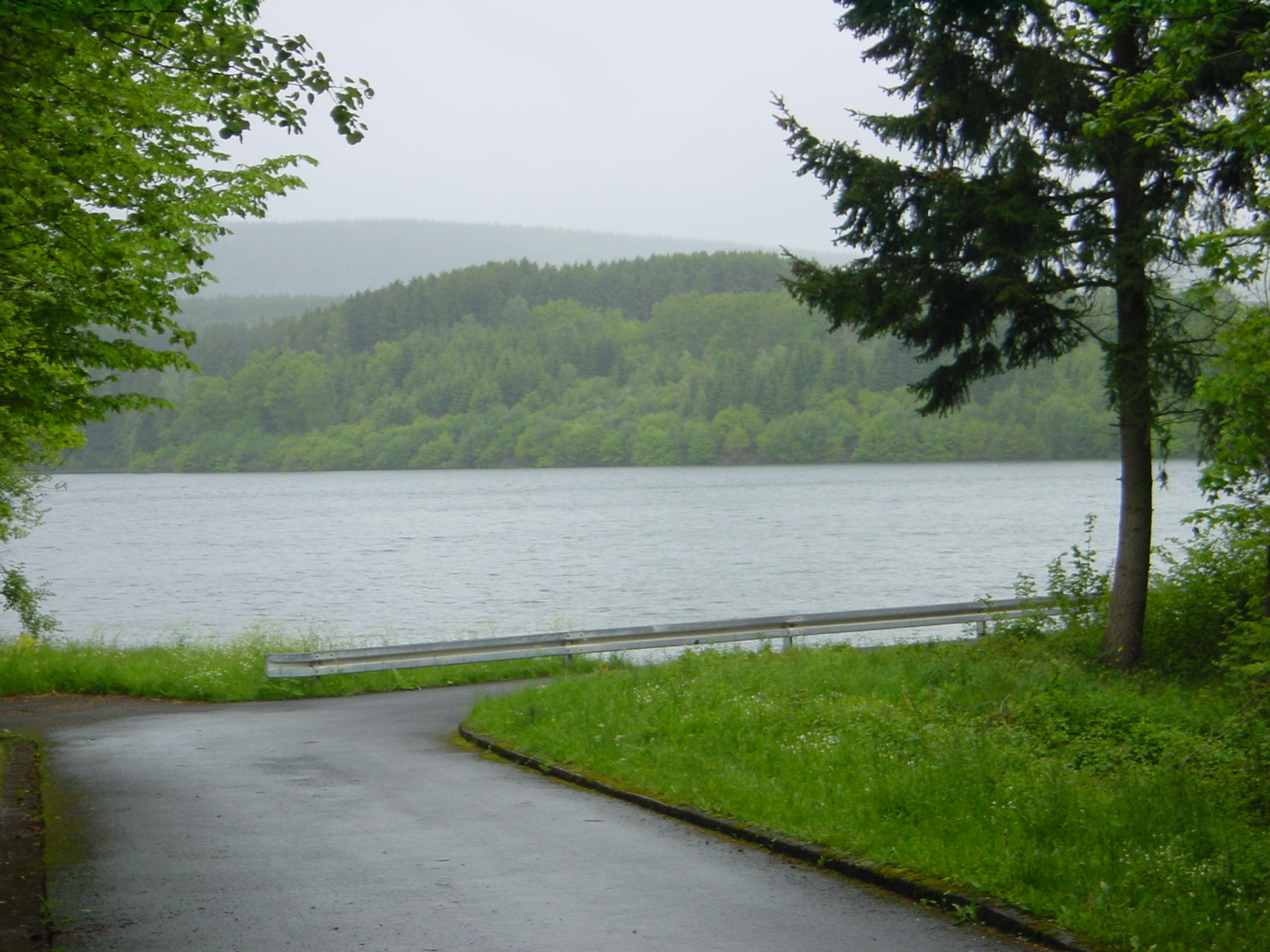
The Steinbach Reservoir

The following lakes and reservoirs are located in, or on the edge of, the Idar Forest:

- Steinbach Reservoir on the Steinbach
