= Rösterkopf =

Mountain in Germany

Coordinates: 49°40′31″N 6°50′06″E

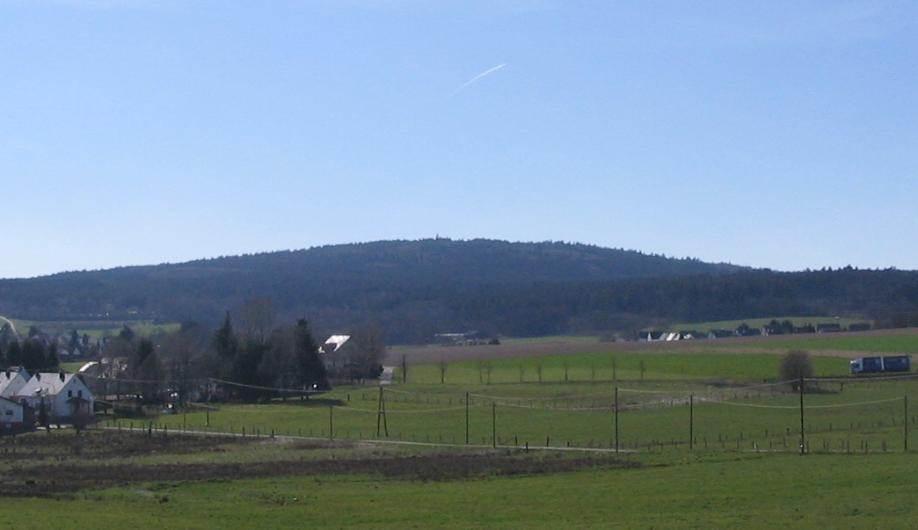
Rösterkopf at Reinsfeld

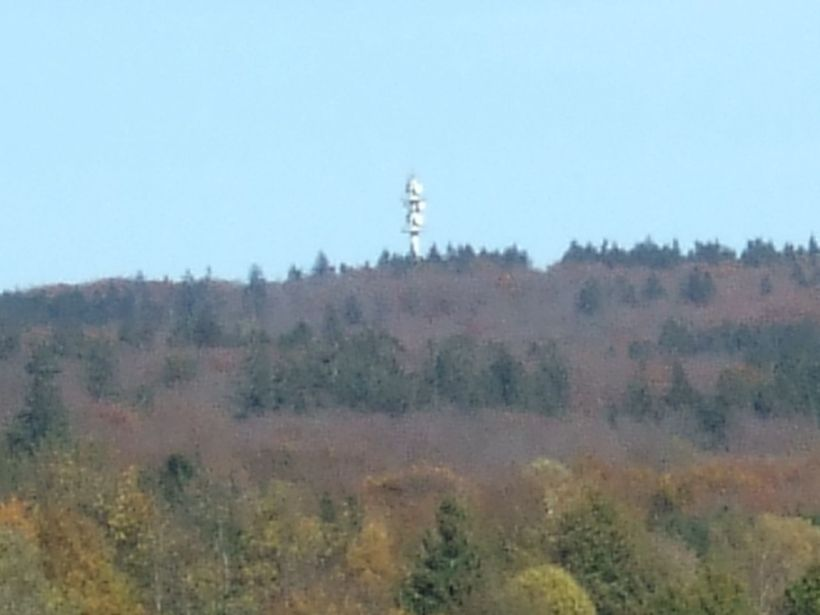
Rösterkopf at Kell am See

The Rösterkopf in the Osburger Hochwald (Hunsrück in Rhineland-Palatinate, Germany) is a mountain with a height of 708 m.
