= Hohe Wurzel (Hunsrück) =

- Location within Rhineland-Palatinate

Highest point
- Elevation: 669 m (2,195 ft)
- Coordinates: 49.7046°N 6.8625°E

Geography
- Location: Rhineland-Palatinate, Germany

Hohe Wurzel, at 669 m (2,195 ft), is the second-highest peak in the Osburger Hochwald in the Hunsrück, Rhineland-Palatinate, Germany.
