= List of mountains and hills of the Eifel =

This List of mountains and hills in the Eifel contains a selection of mountains (2000 feet or higher) and hills (below 2000 feet) in the low mountain range of the Eifel which lies mainly in Germany but also crosses into Belgium. The Eifel is located predominantly in the German states of Rhineland-Palatinate and North Rhine-Westphalia and belongs to the Rhenish Massif.

See also: List of mountains and hills in North Rhine-Westphalia and List of mountains and hills in Rhineland-Palatinate

Elevation	Height (m)	Eifel region(s)	District/ Province	Remarks	Image
Hohe Acht	746.9	High Eifel	Ahrweiler, Mayen-Koblenz	Highest elevation in the Eifel and the High Eifel; Type: volcano; site of the Kaiser Wilhelm Tower	
Ernstberg (also: Erresberg)	698.8	Vulkan Eifel	Vulkaneifel	Highest of the west Eifel volcanos; second highest mountain in the Eifel; Type: volcano	
unnamed peak? (Schwarzer Mann)	699.1	Vulkan Eifel	Vulkaneifel	Highest of the west Eifel volcanos; second highest mountain in the Eifel; Type: volcano	
Schwarzer Mann	697.8	Schnee Eifel, Schneifel	Eifelkreis Bitburg-Prüm	Highest point of the Schneifel ridge and hence the Schnee Eifel	
Signal de Botrange	694.24	Hohes Venn	Liège (B)	Highest mountain in Belgium and the Hohes Venn	
Weißer Stein	693	North Eifel, Zitter Forest	Euskirchen	Highest mountain of the Zitter Forest and in North Rhine-Westphalia west of the Rhine; second highest mountain in Belgium; site of observation tower on the (German) eastern slopes of the mountain	
Scharteberg	691.4	Vulkan Eifel	Vulkaneifel	Second highest elevation in the Vulkan Eifel, lies between Ernstberg and Nerother Kopf; site of transmission tower of SWR’s Eifel Transmitter	
Burgberg ("castle mountain") of the Nürburg	676.5	High Eifel	Ahrweiler	Second highest elevation in the High Eifel; Type: volcano; Located inside the Nordschleife of the old Nürburgring; site of Nürburg castle	
Hochkelberg	674.9	High Eifel	Vulkaneifel	Third highest elevation in the High Eifel; Type: stratovolcano; Roman ringwork and modern transmission mast	
Prümscheid	674.7	Vulkan Eifel	Vulkaneifel	Highest point of the ridge in the Salm Forest near Gerolstein	
Schöneberg	670.2	North Eifel	Ahrweiler		
Raßberg	664.9	High Eifel	Mayen-Koblenz		
Seimersberg	662.9	Schnee-Eifel	Eifelkreis Bitburg-Prüm		
Bärbelkreuz	662.8	Zitterwald	Euskirchen	Nearby: Eifel-Bärbelkreuz Transmission Tower	
Pannensterzkopf (Bovel)	662	Hohes Venn	Liège (B)		
Hühnerhöhe	659.9	North Eifel, Zitter Forest	Euskirchen		
Steling	658.3	Hohes Venn	Aachen (D), Liège (B)	Highest mountain in the district of Aachen	
Steinberg	657.8	Schneifel	Vulkaneifel		
Foltenhöhe	656	North Eifel	Landkreis Euskirchen		
Huppertsberg	655.5	North Eifel	Landkreis Euskirchen		
Döhmberg	653.2	Volcanic Eifel	Vulkaneifel		
Gieschberg	652.0	North Eifel	Euskirchen	Site of the village of Giescheid on the summit	
Nerother Kopf	651.7	Volcanic Eifel	Vulkaneifel	Type: cinder cone; site of the ruined castle of Freudenkoppe	
Prümer Kopf	645.6	Schnee Eifel	Eifelkreis Bitburg-Prüm		
Bockshahn	643.7	High Eifel	Ahrweiler		
Rote Heck	639.9	High Eifel	Vulkaneifel		
Kamberg	637.8	North Eifel, Zitterwald	Euskirchen		
Eselsberg	637	Vulkan Eifel	Vulkaneifel		
Hahnheister	636.3	High Fens	Aachen (GE), Liège (B)		
Auf dem Gericht	632.8	West Eifel	Vulkaneifel		
Apert	631.3	South Eifel	Eifelkreis Bitburg-Prüm		
Hohe Warte	628.2	North Eifel	Ahrweiler		
Aremberg	623.8	Ahr Hills	Ahrweiler	Highest elevation of the Ahr Hills; site of Burg Aremberg	
Dietzenley	617.6	Volcanic Eifel	Vulkaneifel	Highest mountain of the Pelmer Forest, site of wooden observation post	
Auf der Kopp	615.5	South Eifel	Eifelkreis Bitburg-Prüm		
Höchstberg	616	Vulkan Eifel	Vulkaneifel		
Auf der Wurst	615.0	North Eifel	Ahrweiler		
Dreiser Höhe	610.8	High Eifel	Vulkaneifel		
Hohe Mark	609	High Fens	Liège (B)		
Huscheid	607.9	West Eifel	Eifelkreis Bitburg-Prüm		
Steffelnkopf	607	Schnee Eifel	Vulkaneifel		
Hardtkopf	601.5	South Eifel	Eifelkreis Bitburg-Prüm	Highest hill on the edge of the Prümer Kalkmulde	
Achelter	595.7	Schnee Eifel	Vulkaneifel / Eifelkreis Bitburg-Prüm		
Heidenköpfe see: – Heidenkopf I: – Heidenkopf II: – Heidenkopf III: D	595 591; 588,5; 595	Ripsdorf Forest, North Eifel	Euskirchen / Vulkaneifel		
Rödelkaul	592.3	Volcanic Eifel	Vulkaneifel		
Arensberg	561.3	Vulkan Eifel	Vulkaneifel		
Daxelberg	588.7	Vulkan Eifel	Vulkaneifel		
Alter Voß	589.9	Volcanic Eifel	Vulkaneifel		
Bradscheid	588.2	Volcanic Eifel	Vulkaneifel		
Hochsimmer	587.9	High Eifel	Mayen-Koblenz	Site of the Hochsimmer Tower, an observation tower	
Michelsberg	586.1	Ahr Hills	Euskirchen	Highest elevation in Bad Münstereifel; site of St. Michael's Chapel	
unnamed summit Langschoß	583.67	Hohes Venn, Hürtgen Forest	Aachen, Düren	Site of the old NATO direction-finding station, an observation tower and a telecommunication tower; Nearby: fire lookout tower	
Perlerkopf	579.1	North Eifel	Ahrweiler		
Gänsehals	575.3	High Eifel	Mayen-Koblenz		
Denskopf	577.0	High Eifel	Mayen-Koblenz		
Lichtenborner Höhe	570.6	South Eifel	Eifelkreis Bitburg-Prüm		
Kalvarienberg	569	Schneifel	Eifelkreis Bitburg-Prüm	Prüm explosion, 1949	
Engelner Kopf	569	North Eifel	Ahrweiler		
Dackscheidberg	568	South Eifel	Eifelkreis Bitburg-Prüm		
Losenseifen	568	South Eifel	Eifelkreis Bitburg-Prüm		
Eigart	565	North Eifel	Euskirchen	Eifel National Park	
Hochstein	562.5	High Eifel	Mayen-Koblenz	Site of Genoveva Cave	
Auf dem Thron	562	North Eifel	Ahrweiler		
Mäuseberg	561	Vulkan Eifel	Vulkaneifel	Site of Dronke Tower	
Kneiff	560	??? Eifel	Diekirch District, Luxembourg	Highest point in Luxembourg	
Buurgplaatz	559	??? Eifel	Diekirch District, Luxembourg	Second highest point in Luxembourg; often erroneously thought to be the highest	
Steineberger Ley	558	Vulkan Eifel	Vulkaneifel	Site of Vulcano Infoplattform (observation tower)	
Junkerberg	557	Ahr Hills	Ahrweiler		
Rockeskyller Kopf	555	Vulkan Eifel	Vulkaneifel	Type: volcano	
Winterberg (Vulkaneifel)	555	Vulkan Eifel	Vulkaneifel		
Daxberg	549	South Eifel	Vulkaneifel		
Hoher List	549	Vulkan Eifel	Vulkaneifel	Site of Hoher List Observatory	
Alter Burgberg	548	High Eifel	Ahrweiler, Vulkaneifel		
Auf Holbert	543	South Eifel	Eifelkreis Bitburg-Prüm		
Ahrberg	540	High Eifel	Vulkaneifel		
Hahn	539	Schnee-Eifel	Vulkaneifel		
Hirzberg	538	Ripsdorfer Wald	Euskirchen		
Knippberg	537	Ahr Hills	Euskirchen		
Muxerather Höhe	535	South Eifel	Eifelkreis Bitburg-Prüm		
Hühnerberg	533.5	Ahr Hills	Euskirchen		
Hohe Kuppe	531	South Eifel	Eifelkreis Bitburg-Prüm		
Steinerberg	531	North Eifel	Ahrweiler		
Kuppe near Wolfgarten	527.8	Rur Eifel, Kermeter	Euskirchen	Highest elevation in the Kermeter; Eifel National Park; site of Wolfgarten Fire Tower	
Scheidkopf	527	Osteifel	Mayen-Koblenz		
Hellberg	525.8	Rur Eifel, Kermeter	Euskirchen	Eifel National Park	
Wildbretshügel	525.3	Rur Eifel, Kermeter	Euskirchen	Eifel National Park	
Goldberg	523	South Eifel	Vulkaneifel		
Kalvarienberg	523	North Eifel	Euskirchen		
Kirchberg	520	North Eifel	Euskirchen		
Lenzerath	519.3	Schnee-Eifel	Vulkaneifel		
Mosenberg	519	Vulkan Eifel	Bernkastel-Wittlich	Site of Windsborn crater lake, summit cross and observation post	
Verbrannter Berg	515.5	Rur Eifel, Kermeter	Euskirchen	Eifel National Park	
Kopnück	514	Ahr Hills	Euskirchen		
Wendelsberg	513	Vulkan Eifel	Vulkaneifel	site of Daun Deer Park (aka: Stag and Boar Park)	
Geerberg	510	Vulkan Eifel	Cochem-Zell, Mayen-Koblenz		
Vulkan Kalem	509,4	South Eifel	Vulkaneifel		
Häuschen	507	North Eifel	Ahrweiler	Ruins of an observation tower	
Hahnenkopf	505	South Eifel	Eifelkreis Bitburg-Prüm		
Winterberg (Kermeter)	503.4	Rur Eifel, Kermeter		Site of Kermeterstollen below the western flanks of the hill	
Hochthürmen	499.8	North Eifel	Ahrweiler, Euskirchen	Site of Roman circular fort	
Pflugberg	498	North Eifel	Euskirchen		
Teufelsley	496	North Eifel	Ahrweiler		
Hardtberg	495	South Eifel	Eifelkreis Bitburg-Prüm		
Honigberg	495	Rur Eifel, Kermeter	Düren	Eifel National Park; viewing point for the Rur Reservoir	
Adert	488	North Eifel	Ahrweiler	Popular viewing point	
Hasenberg	471	North Eifel	Ahrweiler		
Römerberg	470	Vulkan Eifel	Vulkaneifel		
Krufter Ofen	463	Vulkan Eifel	Mayen-Koblenz		
Weidenauer Berg	453.3	Rur Eifel, Kermeter	Düren	Eifel National Park	
Laacher Kopf	442	Vulkan Eifel	Ahrweiler	Nearby: Maria Laach Abbey and Laacher See	
Kellerberg	448	Meulenwald	Bernkastel-Wittlich	Highest elevation of the Meulenwald; site of Kellerberg observation tower	
Stockert	435	Münstereifel Forest	Euskirchen	Site of Astropeiler Stockert radio-telescope	
Herkelstein	434.5	North Eifel	Euskirchen		
Veitskopf	428	Vulkan Eifel	Ahrweiler	Type: volcano; Nearby: Laacher See; site of Observation tower Lydia Tower	
Ettringer Bellerberg (also: Ettringer Bellberg)	427.5	High Eifel	Mayen-Koblenz	Site of crater landscape	
Hummerich (also: Plaidter Hummerich)	425	Vulkan Eifel	Mayen-Koblenz	Type: volcano; Nearby: Laacher See	
Monzeler Hüttenkopf	421	Moselle Hills	Bernkastel-Wittlich		
Mehringer Berg	418	Moselle Hills	Trier-Saarburg		
Falkenlay	414	Pre-Eifel	Cochem-Zell	Observation post below the summit	
Hansenberg	401	Moselle Hills	Bernkastel-Wittlich		
Zoonenberg	401	Meulenwald	Trier-Saarburg		
Burgberg	400.5	Rur Eifel, North Eifel	Düren	Site of former Berenstein imperial castle and Krawutschke observation tower	
Thelenberg	400	Vulkan Eifel	Mayen-Koblenz / Ahrweiler		
Arenberg	399	Pre-Eifel	Cochem-Zell		
Sollig	398	Pre-Eifel	Cochem-Zell		
Hühnerberg	398	Ahr Hills	Ahrweiler	Nearby: Effelsberg Radio Telescope	
Sonnenberg	393,3	Rur Eifel, North Eifel	Düren		
Eickelslay	390	Moselle Eifel			
Blumkirst	389	Pre-Eifel	Cochem-Zell		
Hornberg	388	North Eifel	Ahrweiler		
Calmont	378	Pre-Eifel	Cochem-Zell	Has the steepest individual vineyard in Europe	
Hochkopf	376	North Eifel	Rhein-Sieg-Kreis		
Thomasberg	378	Moselle Hills	Bernkastel-Wittlich		
Steckenberg	366	North Eifel	Ahrweiler	Site of observation tower	
Rothenberg	365	Moselle Hills	Bernkastel-Wittlich		
Mayener Bellerberg („Mayener Bellberg“)	363	High Eifel	Mayen-Koblenz		
Krausberg	360	North Eifel	Ahrweiler	Site of Krausberg Tower and Krausberghütte	
Römerberg	359	Meulenwald	Trier-Saarburg		
Bausenberg	340	North Eifel	Ahrweiler	Type: volcano	
Neuenahrer Berg	339	North Eifel	Ahrweiler	Site of ruined castle of Neuenahr and Langer Köbes observation tower	
Tomberg	316	North Eifel	Rhein-Sieg-Kreis	Type: volcano; Tomburg castle	
Hochburg	306	South Eifel	Trier-Saarburg	Old Celtic refuge castle: Hochburg	
Elterlay	294	South Eifel	Trier-Saarburg	Genoveva Cave	
Beuelskopf	291.9	North Eifel	Rhein-Sieg-Kreis	Remains of the Hans-Wischeler Tower	
Scheidskopf	280	North Eifel	Ahrweiler	Site of partly accessible quarry and Roman ringwork	
Landskrone	272	North Eifel	Ahrweiler	Site of Landskron Castle	

== Sources ==
- Whittow, John (1984). Dictionary of Physical Geography. London: Penguin, 1984. ISBN 0-14-051094-X.
