= Schnee Eifel =

Wooded landscape in the Central Uplands, Germany

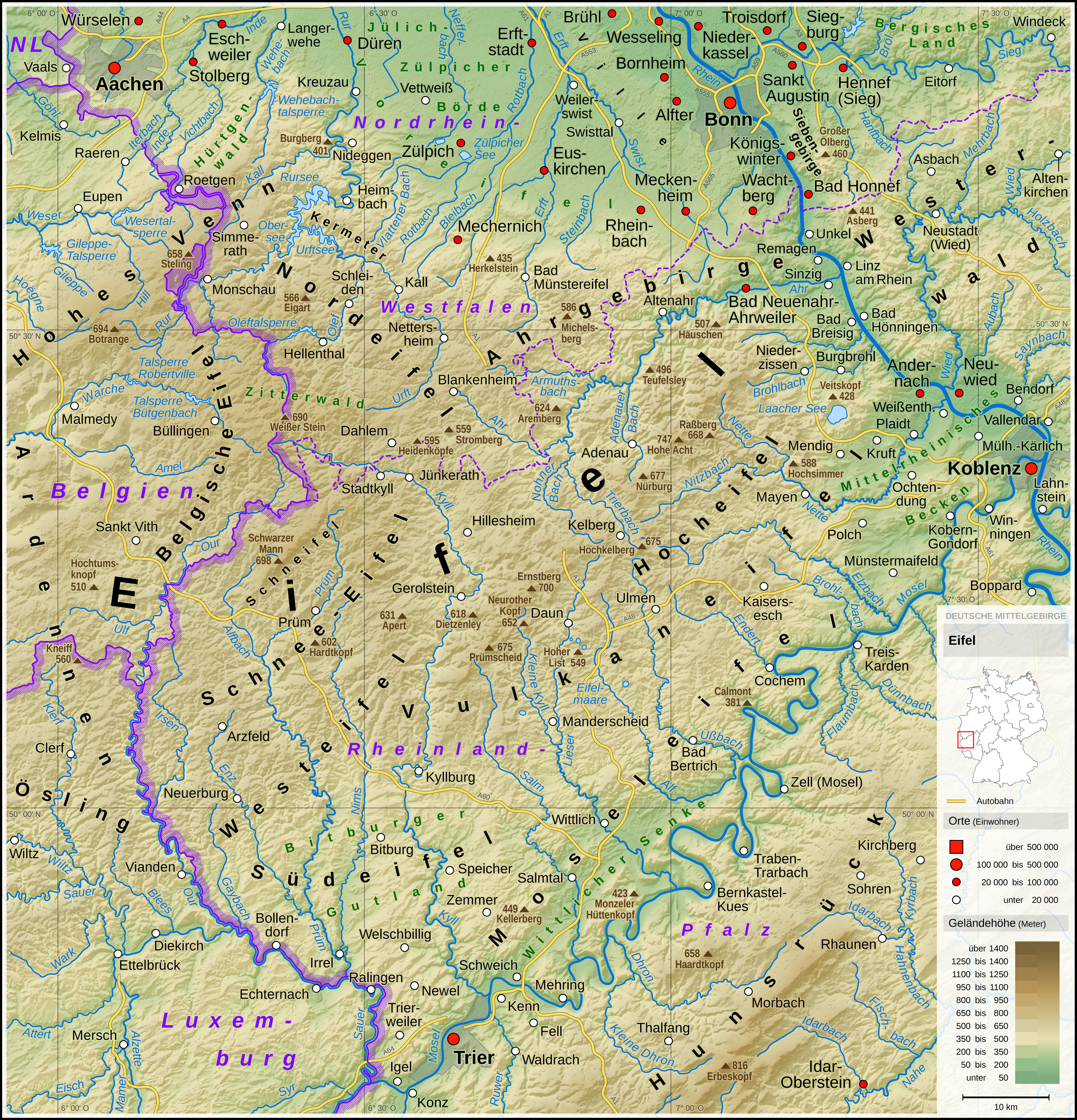
Overview map of the Eifel. The High Eifel is the central area from Gerolstein to Adenau, the Schnee Eifel (German: Schneeeifel or Schnee-Eifel) is the western region from Prüm to Stadtkyll

The Schnee Eifel is a heavily wooded landscape in Germany's Central Uplands, up to 699.1 m above sea level (NHN), that forms part of the western Eifel in the area of the German-Belgian border. The name may have been derived in the 19th century from the Schneifel chain of hills, which had nothing to do with snow (Schnee), but with the name for a forest swathe (Schneise).

== Geography ==
The Schnee Eifel natural region is formed by the southern part of the Hohes Venn-Eifel Nature Park. To the north it is bounded by the river Kyll, the border with the North Eifel, that begins near Hallschlag and Kronenburg with the Zitter Forest; To the east the Kyll forms the boundary river with the High Eifel. To the south, the Schnee Eifel merges into the South Eifel to Pronsfeld in the Prümer Land. Its highest elevation is found on the Schneifel ridge: the 697.3 metres (2,288 ft) high Schwarzer Mann ("Black Man").

The term Schneifel is frequently employed in publications to mean the whole Schnee Eifel region, but they are not synonymous. The Schneifel is the uninhabited central chain of hills in the Schnee-Eifel; whose coverage goes beyond the narrow definition of the Schneifel and includes the southern source region of the Kyll and its upper reaches as well as the adjoining Prüm Forest southeast of the main crest.

The largest town in the Schnee Eifel is Prüm, which lies on the river of the same name. Its well-known ski areas are the Schwarze Mann and the Wolfsschlucht. They lie about 15 kilometres (9.3 mi) northwest and 5 kilometres (3.1 mi) north of Prüm respectively.

=== Geology ===
Much of the Eifel belongs to the Rhine Massif. The Schnee Eifel, and in particular, the Schneifel, its highest region, is a truncated upland, the stumps of once great mountains that were formed by Hercynian folding during the Devonian period of geological history. After a long period of severe erosion they were uplifted again in the Quaternary period. Scattered areas of old rock with smooth relief still exist, although they are sometimes hard to discern. Rougher highlands stand out from this base, especially in the north (Prümer Land), owing to the hardness of their rocks, like the quartzite ridge of the Schneifel. This long, sinewy ridge juts out above the less jagged, old plateau by around 100 metres and is clear evidence of the resistance of the local quartz rock to the forces of weathering.

It is remarkable for its length of 15 kilometres (9.3 mi) against an average width of just 2 kilometres (1.2 mi). With little variation in height, it runs from Brandscheid as far as Ormont near Stadtkyll, where it ends at the Steinberg (654 m).

=== Fauna ===
Due to its remote location, the Schnee-Eifel is undeveloped, where rare plants and animals may be found, including the wildcat and, for several years now, the Eurasian lynx.

== Fiction ==
The hamlet of Winterspelt is the setting for the novel of the same name by Alfred Andersch, which takes place in the final months of the Second World War.

== See also ==
- West Eifel, Belgian Eifel, North Eifel, South Eifel, Vulkan Eifel, Rur Eifel, Hohes Venn
- Basalt, Quartzite
