= Heidenköpfe =

- Location within North Rhine-Westphalia

Highest point
- Elevation: 595 m above sea level (NHN) (1,952 ft)
- Coordinates: 50°23′02″N 6°35′11″E

Geography
- Location: near Dahlem; Euskirchen, Vulkaneifel; North Rhine-Westphalia, Rhineland-Palatinate (Germany)
- Parent range: North Eifel (Ripsdorf Forest)

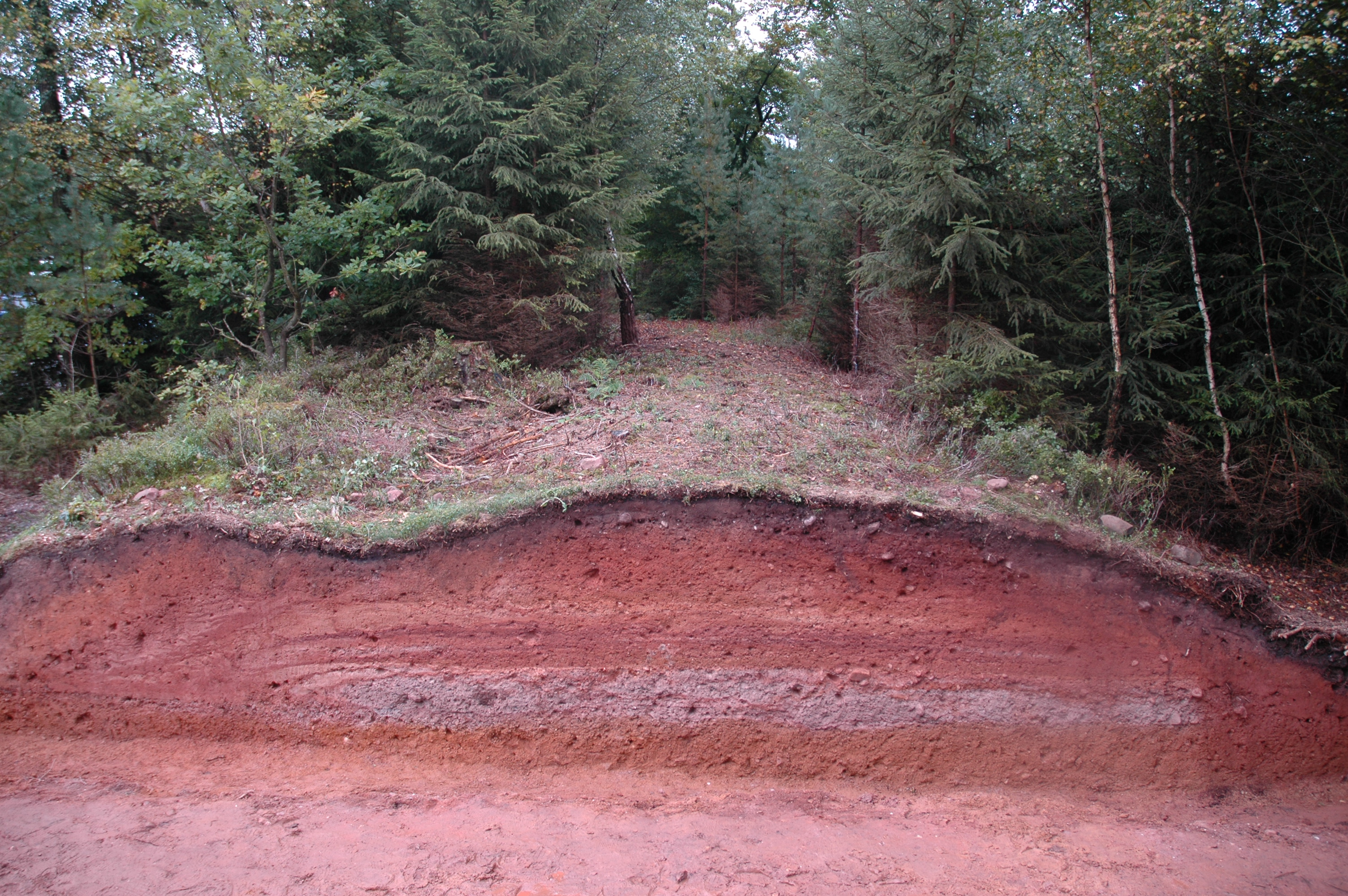
Exposed profile of the Roman road from Trier to Cologne on the Heidenköpfen

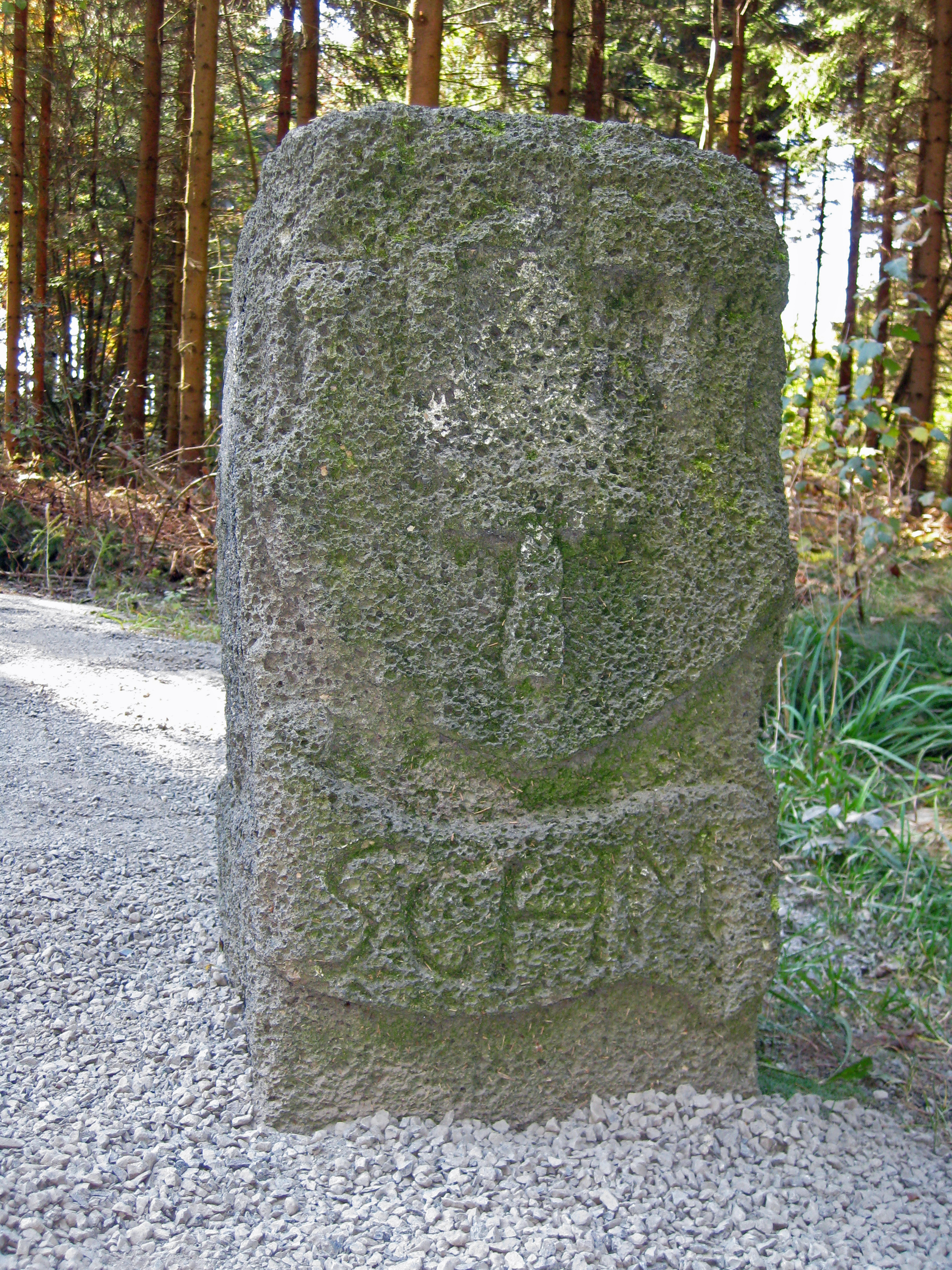
Vierherrenstein on the Roman road between Dahlem and Esch

The Heidenköpfe (plural) are a group of three summits (Heidenkopf I, Heidenkopf II und Heidenkopf III) near Dahlem in Germany that are about 595 m above sea level (NHN). They lie within the mountain region of North Eifel in the counties of Euskirchen and Vulkaneifel in the states of North Rhine-Westphalia (NW) and Rhineland-Palatinate (RP).

== Geography ==
=== Location ===
The Heidenköpfe lie within the Ripsdorf Forest, part of the North Eifel, and also within the northern part of the High Fens-Eifel Nature Park and southern part of the Volcanic Eifel Nature Park. They are on average about 2 kilometres east of Dahlem (NW), 3.5 kilometres south-southeast of Schmidtheim (NW), 3.5 kilometres northwest of Esch (RP) and 3 kilometres (as the crow flies) west of Waldorf (NW). The forested Heidenköpfe rise only gently above the aforementioned villages, which are not far below them.

Among the streams on the Heidenköpfen are the Kyll tributary of the Glaadtbach (Schmidtheimer Morbach) which rises on Heidenkopf I the Glaadtbach tributary of the Morbach which rises on Heidenkopf II and the Ahr tributary of the Schaafbach (Eichholzbach) which has its source on Heidenkopf III.

=== Summits ===
The three Heidenköpfe are as follows – with height in metres (m) above sea level (NHN):

- Heidenkopf I (ca. 591 m; 50°23′43″N 6°34′21″E), NW; hillock; with Roman road
- Heidenkopf II (588.5 m; 50°22′54″N 6°33′45″E), NW; hill spur; with firing range
- Heidenkopf III (ca. 595 m; 50°23′2″N 6°35′11″E), NW / RP; kuppe; with Roman road.

== Roman road from Trier to Cologne ==
The old Roman road from Trier to Cologne used to run through the wooded region between Heidenkopf I and III. A section of this has been exposed together with the Vierherrenstein, a stone marker that lies on the boundary between the local parishes 620 metres southwest of Heidenkopf III.

== Transport and hiking ==
The B 51 runs past the Heidenköpfen to the northwest and west between Dahlem and Schmidtheim, and the B 421 to the southwest and south between Kyll and Jünkerath. The Kreisstraße 67 branches off the latter in Jünkerath and runs northeast to Esch and then continues to Waldorf. The Eifel Line (Eifel Railway) runs past the hills to the west through Schmidtheim, Dahlem and Jünkerath, from where the Venn Railway once branched off and headed for Belgium. From these transport axes there are several forest trails and tracks to the hills.
