= Schwarzer Mann =

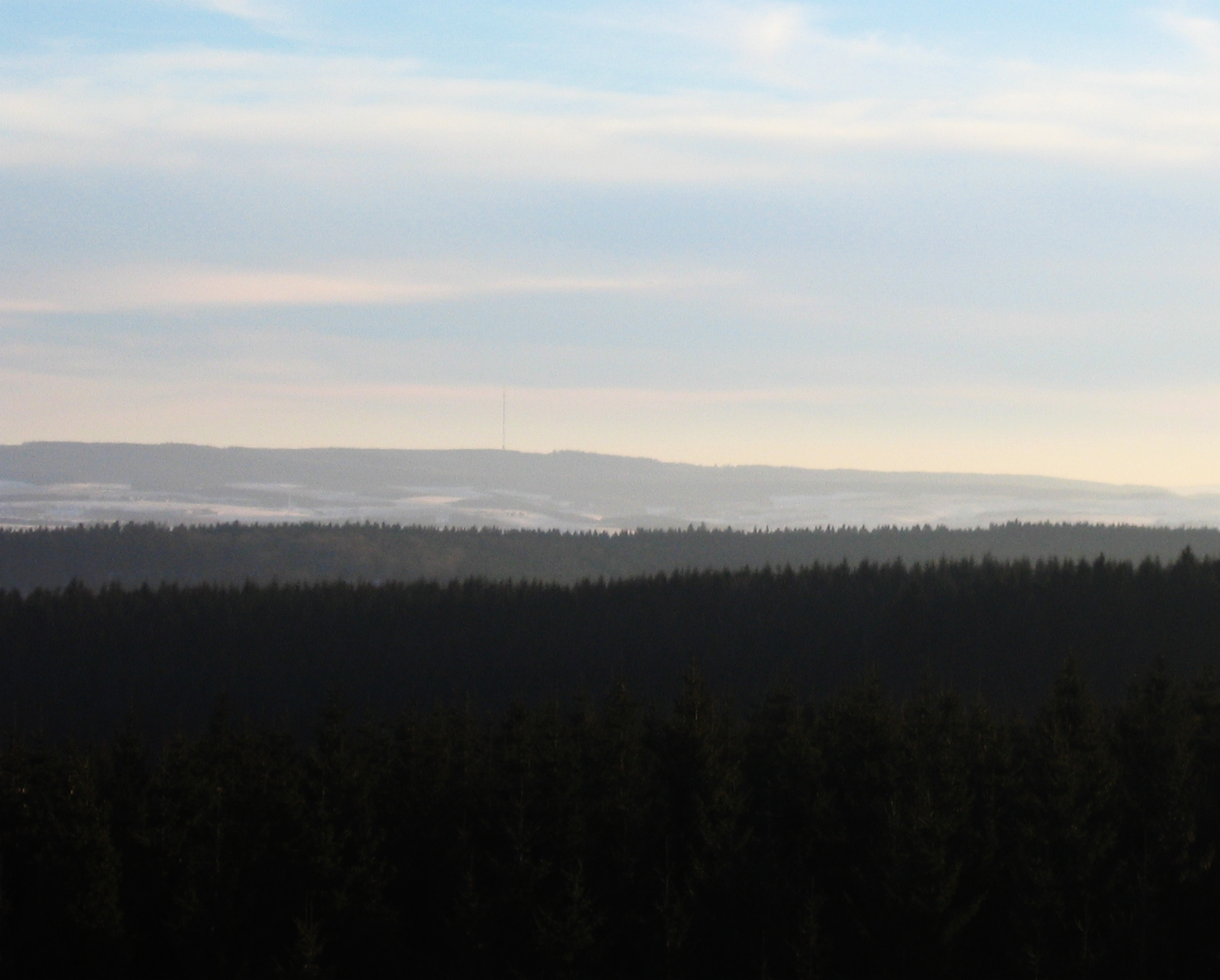
- View from the Weißer Stein in the Zitterwald forest looking south to the Schwarzer Mann and the tower of the Schnee Eifel transmitter (mid-2006)

Highest point
- Elevation: 697.8 m above sea level (NHN) (2,289 ft)
- Listing: – Highest Schneifel summit – winter sports area – Schnee Eifel transmitter
- Coordinates: 50°15′24.9″N 6°21′35.7″E

Geography
- Location within Rhineland-Palatinate
- Location: Near Buchet-Halenfeld; Bitburg-Prüm, Rhineland-Palatinate, Germany
- Parent range: Schneifel (Eifel)

The Schwarzer Mann ("Black Man") is a mountain in the western part of the Eifel which is known as Schnee Eifel. With a height of 697.8 meters it is the highest peak in the Schnee Eifel and third highest in the Eifel.

== Geography ==
=== Location ===
The Schwarzer Mann rises in the west of the Eifel in the Schnee Eifel, near the border with Belgium and within the High Fens-Eifel Nature Park. Its mountain summit lies around 3 kilometres west of Halenfeld (part of Buchet), 3.8 km west-northwest of Wascheid (part of Gondenbrett) and 3.3 km (each as the crow flies) north of Sellerich; the boundary between Buchet and Sellerich runs over the top. In the vicinity is the town of Prüm to the southeast as well as the villages of Bleialf to the west-southwest and Ormont to the northeast. On the northern slopes of the mountain rises the Alfbach stream, on the eastern mountainside, the Litzenmehlenbach and on its southern slopes, the Mönbach.

Near the summit is the Tranchotstein. This small boundary stone was named after French geographer, Jean Joseph Tranchot (1752–1815), who undertook a survey of the Rhinelands by order of Napoleon Bonaparte.

=== Geology ===
The Schwarzer Mann is made of quartzite which is also 15-kilometers-long.

== Usage ==
The area surrounding of Schwarzer Mann is a well-developed hiking area and the largest skiing area in Rhineland-Palatinate.

== Flora and fauna ==
The heavily wooded mountain ridge is covered mainly with spruce and is host to a number of rare wild species including the European wildcat.

== Name ==
The name of the mountain is derived from the nearby abandoned lead ore mine in Bleialf from which the miners would return with blackened faces.
