= Eigart =

- Location within North Rhine-Westphalia

Highest point
- Elevation: 565.5 m above sea level (NN) (1,855 ft)
- Coordinates: 50°31′57″N 6°24′17″E

Geography
- Location: Euskirchen, North Rhine-Westphalia, Germany
- Parent range: North Eifel

The Eigart is a hill located in the county of Euskirchen in the German state of North Rhine-Westphalia at 565.5 m above sea level (NN), in the North Eifel.

The Eigart is situated in the High Fens-Eifel Nature Park a little east of the Eifel National Park. It lies west of the village of Berescheid in the borough of Schleiden. The hill is used for agriculture and is a starting point for walks around Berescheid, some of which also enter the nearly national park. It is also a good viewing point, from which there are views over Berescheid and the valley of the Schafbach which is part of the Olef catchment as well as other summits such as the Hohe Acht.
