= Apert =

Mountain in Rhineland-Palatinate, Germany

- Location within Rhineland-Palatinate

Highest point
- Elevation: 631.3 m above sea level (NHN) (2,071 ft)
- Listing: Mountains and hills of the Eifel
- Coordinates: 50°12′03″N 6°33′39″E

Geography
- Country: Germany
- State: Rhineland-Palatinate
- Parent range: Volcanic Eifel

Geology
- Rock type: Slate

Apert is a forested mountain, 631.3 m above sea level (NHN), in the western Volcanic Eifel, a mountain range in the German state of Rhineland-Palatinate. It rises about two kilometres south of Büdesheim and is the highest point in the parish (Gemarkung).

== Geology ==
The region is part of the Rhenish Massif; the basement of the Apert consists of the fossil-rich Büdesheim Slate and Flinz, a rock of the lower Upper Devonian. Fossils of the following biological orders have been found (sometimes as index fossils): Buchiola, Cheiloceras, Goniatites, Clymeniida, Orthoceras and Manticoceras.

== External links and map ==
- "Topographic map of Apert". opentopomap.org.
- View from the Apert
- Landesamt für Vermessung und Geobasisinformation Rheinland-Pfalz: topographic map 1:25,000 series, Sheet 5705, Gerolstein
