= West Eifel =

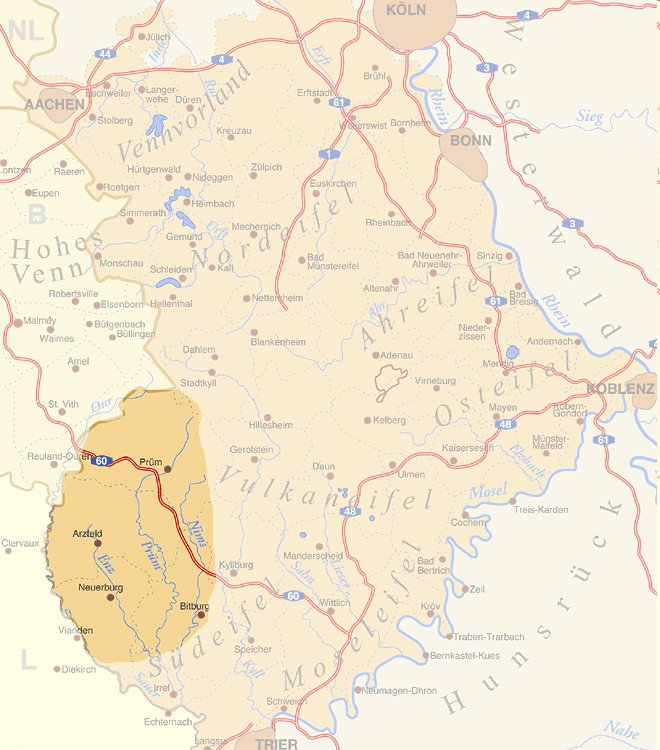
Approximate location of the West Eifel

The West Eifel (German: Westeifel) refers to that part of the Eifel mountains in Germany that is centred on the town of Prüm and reaches as far as the border with Belgium and Luxembourg. It is not geographically precisely defined however, overlapping by about 60% with the Schnee Eifel), whilst geologically its northern half is part of the Vulkaneifel and its southern half part of the South Eifel.

The grassy summits are somewhat higher than those of the Vulkan Eifel, but are generally more rounded and less rugged. Geographically and topologically it can be divided into three regions:

- Schneifel (Schwarzer Mann 697 m), a ridge near the Belgian border
- Belgian Eifel (not a uniformly used term)
- Islek (in the southwest), up to the German-Luxembourg border.

The region is only sparsely populated in the north (~Schneifel), but is crossed by Autobahn 60 (to Malmedy). It is heavily wooded and mining is of some importance (see Bleialf). In the southern parts—in the valley of the Prüm and its tributaries—there is greater settlement and a degree of non-local traffic on the South Eifel Holiday Route (Ferienstraße Südeifel) and the Eifel-Ardennes Green Road (Grüne Straße Eifel-Ardennen). The area is part of the German-Luxembourg Nature Park.

== See also ==
- South Eifel, Vulkan Eifel, North Eifel
- Belgian Eifel, Ösling (Luxembourg)

== Literature and external links ==
- Deutsche Generalkarte 1:200.000, Blatt 12 (Germany: General Map, Sheet 12)
- Mineral finds in Bleialf
- Luxembourg Earth science portal
