= Nerother Kopf =

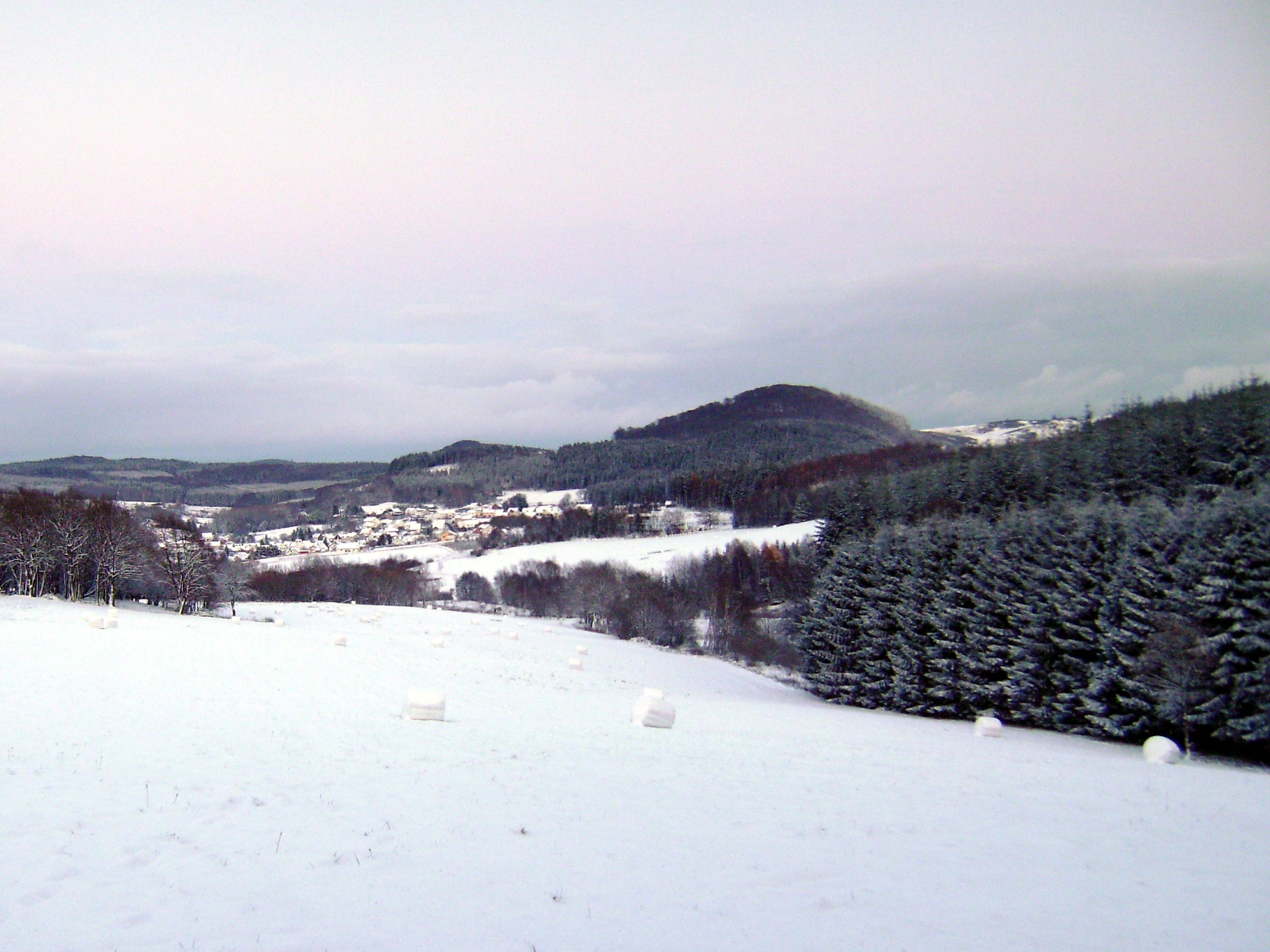
- The Nerother Kopf seen from the west on a late winter's afternoon. At the foot of the hill (left centre) is the village of Neroth; the ruins of Freudenkoppe castle are hidden by beeches

Highest point
- Elevation: 651.7 m above sea level (NHN) (2,138 ft)
- Coordinates: 50°11′38″N 6°45′39″E

Geography
- Location within Rhineland-Palatinate
- Location: Near Neroth; Vulkaneifel, Rhineland-Palatinate (Germany)
- Features: Ruined castle of Freudenkoppe and Mühlstein Cave
- Parent range: Volcanic Eifel (Eifel)

Geology
- Rock age: ca. 700,000 years old
- Mountain type: Volcanic cinder cone
- Rock type: Basalt

The Nerother Kopf is the conical hill of an extinct volcano (a cinder cone) near Neroth in the Eifel mountains. It is 651.7 m above sea level (NHN) and situated in the county of Vulkaneifel in the German state of Rhineland-Palatinate.

== Geographical location ==
The Nerother Kopf rises in the Volcanic Eifel Nature Park on the eastern edge of the Gerolstein Land. Its north top, or kuppe, lies around 1 km east-southeast of Neroth, 2.5 km west-southwest of Neunkirchen, 3.5 km west of Pützborn and 2 km (all as the crow flies) north of Oberstadtfeld. About 450 metres from the north top is the lower south kuppe. To the west the stream of Kleine Kyll flows through Neroth.

== Description and history ==
On the north top of the originally prominent double volcano are the ruins of a castle, the Freudenkoppe - built 1337–1340 and now a protected monument - as well as the Mühlstein Cave. The entrance to the cave, which is near the summit, lies at a height of 643.2 m. It was in the cave where the Nerother Wandervogel, a youth club, was founded on New Year's Eve in 1919/1920. The nature reserve of Nerother Kopf around the beech-covered north top is a popular walking and recreation area which is accessed by several paths including the Eifelsteig, which runs right over the summit. The south top, whose summit region is treeless, has been mined for many years for its basalt. The snow-covered edge of the quarry can be seen in the above photograph on the horizon to the right of the summit.

== See also ==
- List of mountains and hills of the Eifel
- List of volcanoes in Germany
