= Dietzenley =

Mountain in Germany

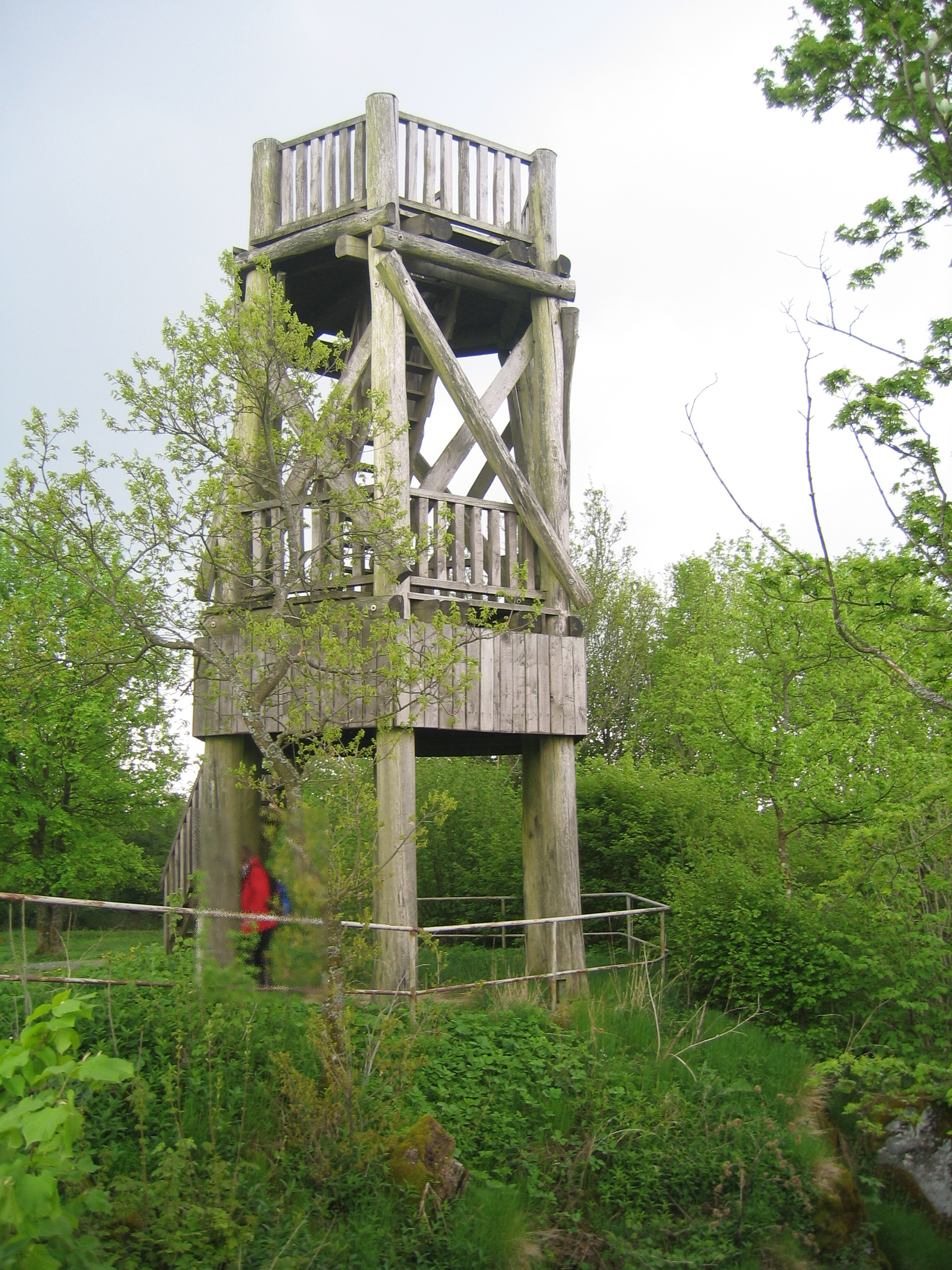
- Viewing tower on the Dietzenley

Highest point
- Elevation: 617.6 m above sea level (NHN) (2,026 ft)
- Coordinates: 50°12′09″N 6°40′40″E

Geography
- Location within Rhineland-Palatinate
- Location: Vulkaneifel county, Rhineland-Palatinate, Germany (Viewing tower at the summit)
- Parent range: Volcanic Eifel

Geology
- Mountain type: volcano
- Rock type: Basalt

The Dietzenley in the county of Vulkaneifel in the German state of Rhineland-Palatinate is a mountain, 617.6 m above sea level (NHN), and the highest point in the Pelm Forest, a part of the Volcanic Eifel range.

The Dietzenley rises within the Volcanic Eifel Nature Park in the parish of Gerolstein north and above the Gerolstein quarter of Büscheich-Niedereich.

On the largely wooded domed summit stands a small, wooden observation tower, which offers a good view of the Volcanic Eifel. Somewhat below it there is an electrical converter and the remains of a Celtic ringwall.

The Dietzenley may be reached on footpaths from Gerolstein, Pelm or Gees.

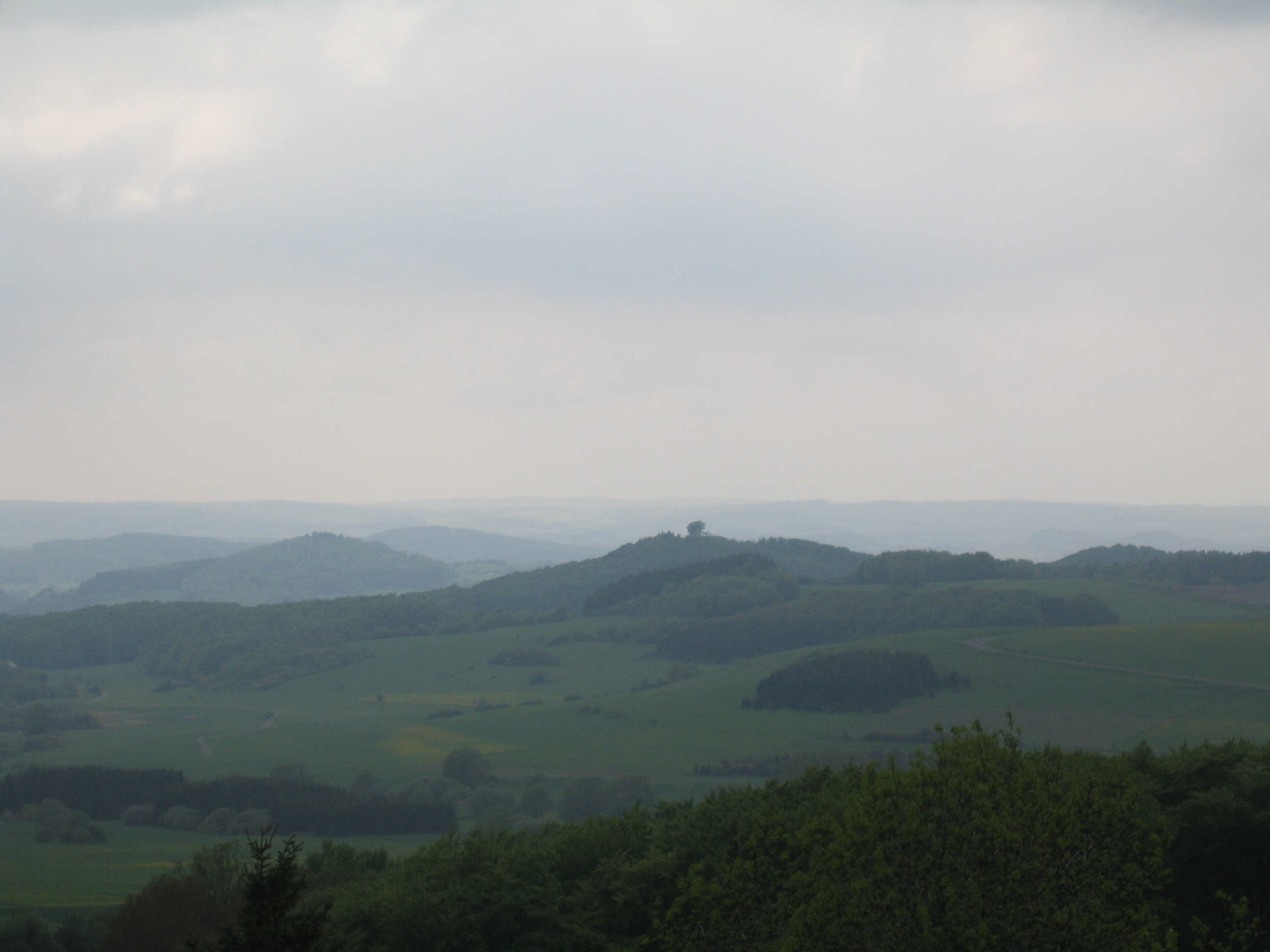
View of the Alter Voß from the tower
