= Venn Foreland =

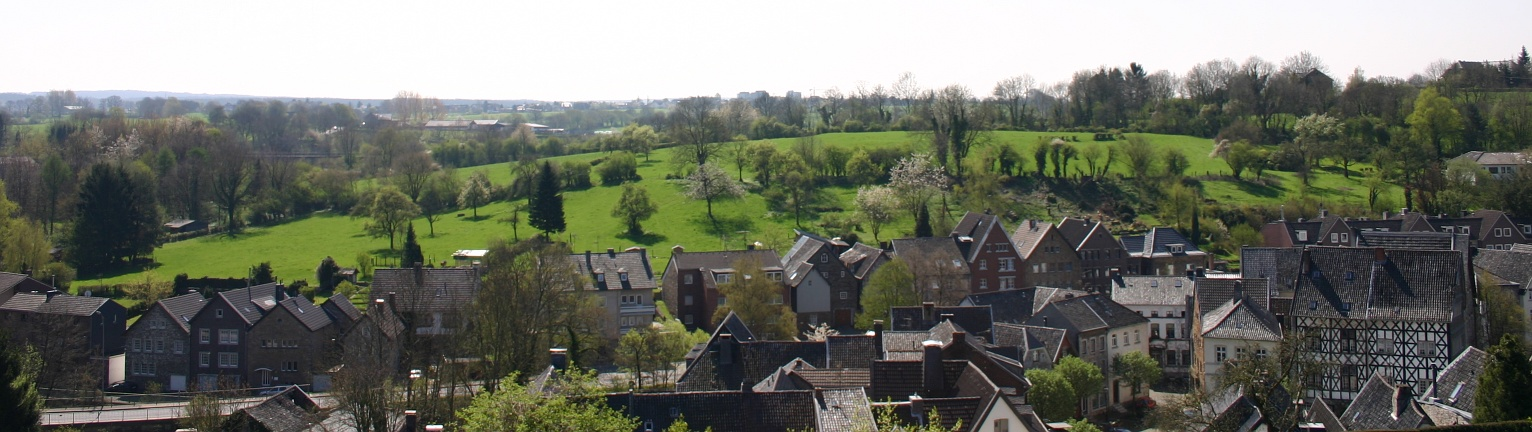
View of the Venn Foreland near Kornelimünster. On the horizon: Walheim

The Venn Foreland (German: Vennvorland) is a region of the North Eifel on the northwestern edge of the High Fens and in its transition zone with the Jülich-Zülpich Börde. Also part of the region are the areas around the city of Aachen and town of Stolberg as well as parts of Eschweiler. It is a heavily built-up area and includes the largest part of the Aachen Municipal Region. Even parts of the High Fens-Eifel Nature Park belong to it. The valley of the river Inde forms its boundary with the High Fens. The region is hilly with an average height of 200 metres and rising to just over 350 metres above sea level. Its highest point is the Brandenberg in the Aachen Forest at 355.4 m above sea level (NHN).

== Natural regions ==
The Venn Foreland consists of the following natural regions:

- 56 Venn Foreland (Vennvorland)
  - 560 Venn Foothills (Vennfußfläche)
    - 560.0 Kornelimünster Venn Foreland (Kornelimünsterer Vennvorland)
  - 561 Aachen Hills (Aachener Hügelland)
    - 561.0 Stolberg Valley (Stolberger Talung)
    - 561.1 Aachen Bowl (Aachener Kessel)
    - 561.2 Aachen Forest (Aachener Wald)
    - 561.3 Vaals Hills (Vaalser Hügelland)
