= Volcanic Eifel Nature Park =

Nature park in Rhineland-Palatinate, Germany

Coordinates: 50°13′49.5″N 6°46′8.8″E

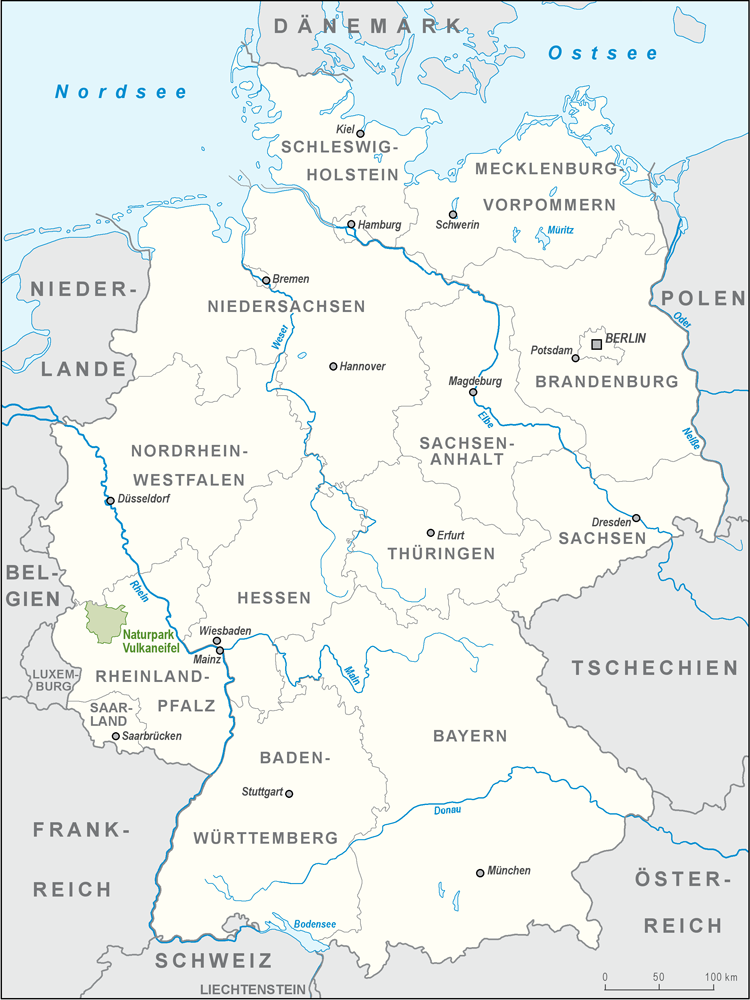
Location of the Volcanic Eifel Nature Park in Germany

The Volcanic Eifel Nature Park (German: Naturpark Vulkaneifel) lies in the counties of Bernkastel-Wittlich, Cochem-Zell and Vulkaneifel in the German state of Rhineland-Palatinate. The nature park, which is in the Eifel mountains, and which is also a geopark, was inaugurated on 31 May 2010 and has an area of 1,068.24 km^{2}.> Its sponsor is the Natur- und Geopark Vulkaneifel GmbH.

The Volcanic Eifel Nature Park incorporates large parts of the Volcanic Eifel and parts of the Volcanic West Eifel with its volcanoes that were still active until about 10,000 years ago numerous maars and lava streams as well as mineral springs and carbonic springs. Red sandstones and marine depositions date to an age of up to 400 million years ago. In addition, the region has a diverse cultural landscape as well as species-rich flora and fauna, extensive forests, mountains and valleys and numerous streams and rivers.

The highest mountain of the Volcanic Eifel Nature Park, which is bordered in the northwest and north by the High Fens – Eifel Nature Park, is the Ernstberg which, at 699.8 m above sea level (NHN), is the second highest peak in the Eifel after the Hohe Acht (746.9 m).

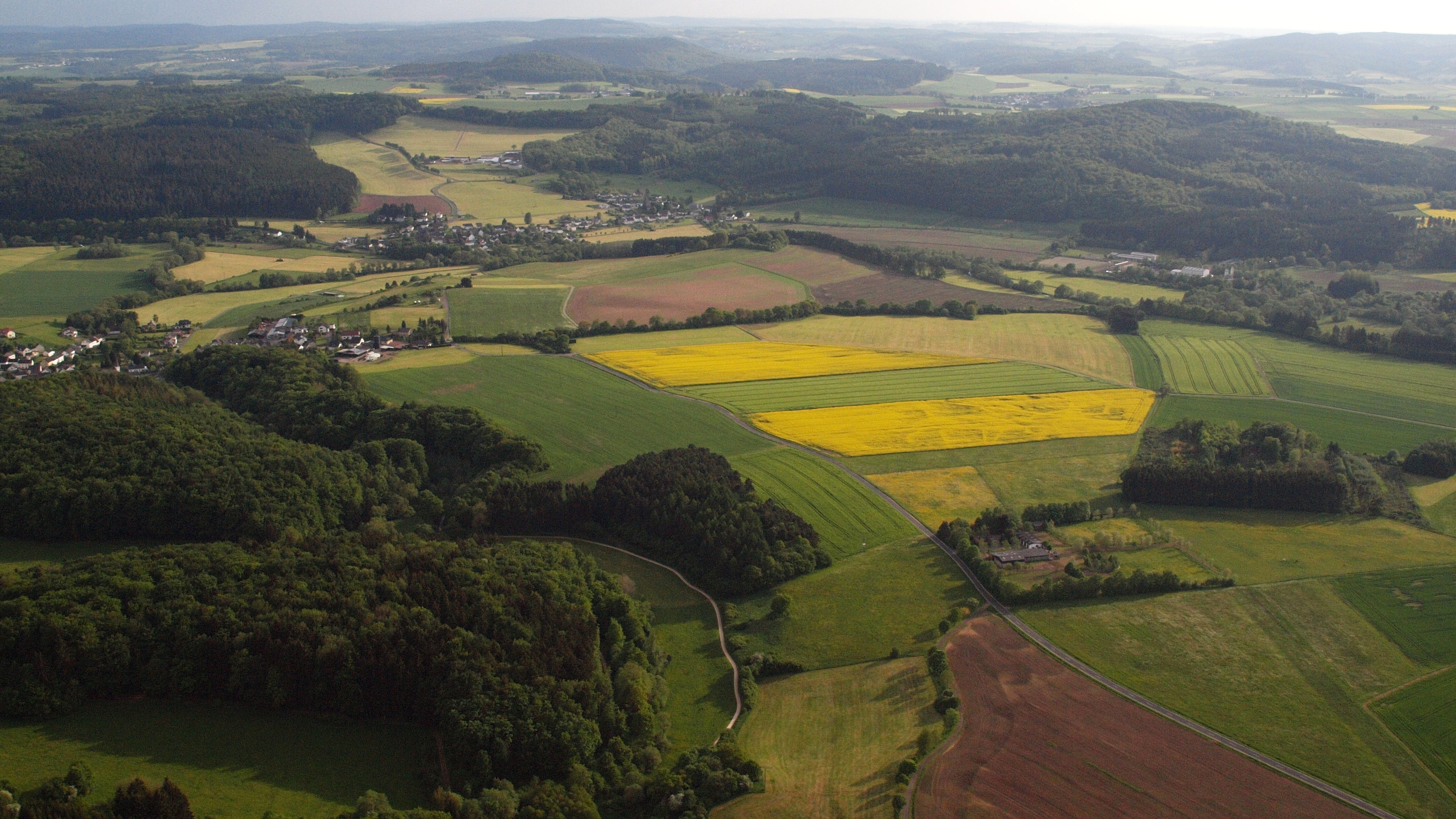
Volcanic Eifel Nature Park: view from Hillesheim looking southwest. Aerial photo (2015)

== See also ==
- List of nature parks in Germany
