= Teufelsley (Rhineland-Palatinate) =

Hill in the East Eifel Mountains of Germany

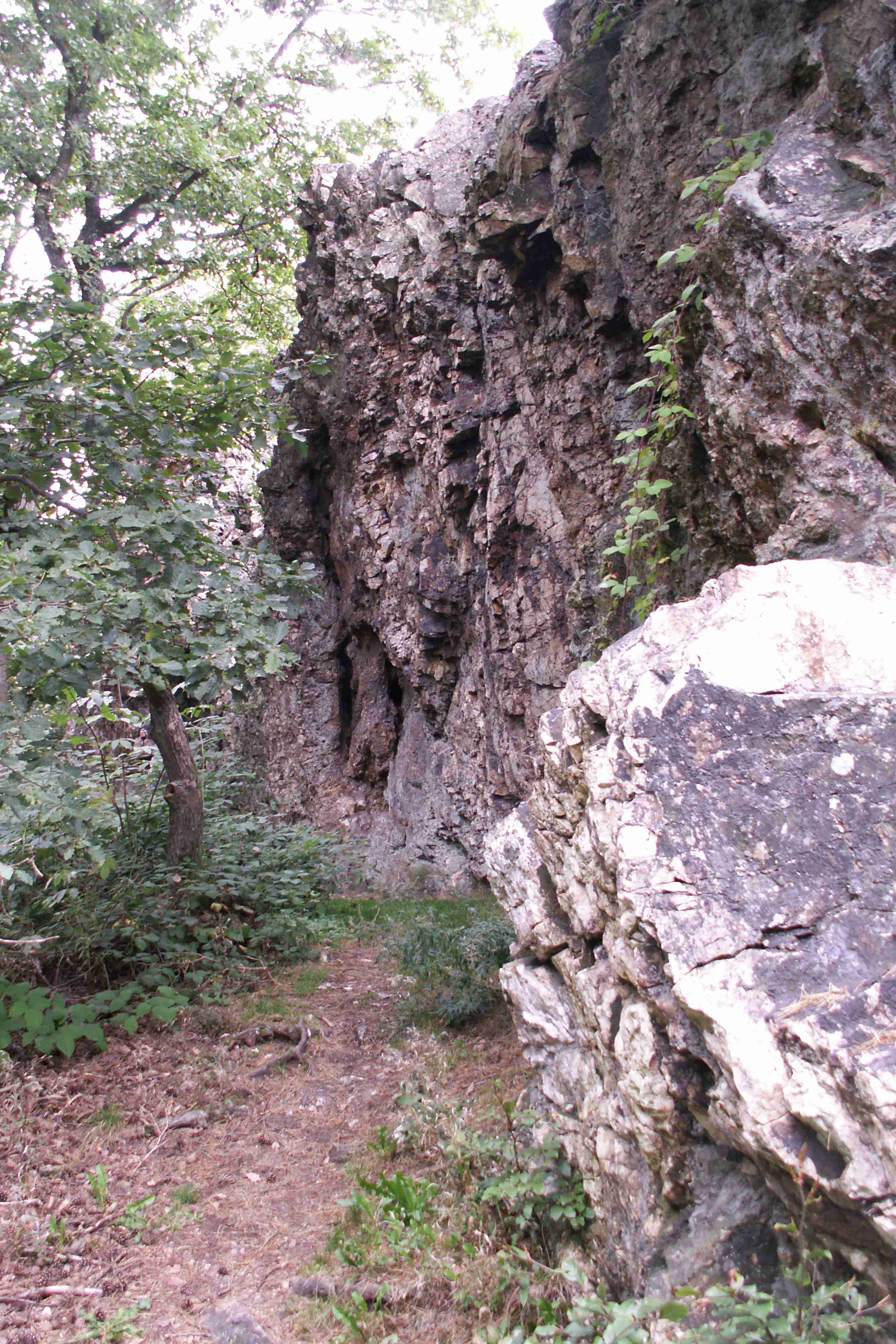
- Rocks of the Teufelsley

Highest point
- Elevation: 495.9 m above sea level (NHN) (1,627 ft)
- Coordinates: 50°27′28.3″N 6°57′45.1″E

Geography
- Location within Rhineland-Palatinate
- Location: Near Liers; Ahrweiler, Rhineland-Palatinate, Germany
- Parent range: East Eifel (Eifel)

Geology
- Rock type: Quartzite

The Teufelsley (cf. ley) is a hill, 495.9 m above sea level (NHN), in the East Eifel, a region of the Eifel mountains in Germany. It is located near Liers in the county of Ahrweiler in the state of Rhineland-Palatinate and consists of the largest contiguous quartzite block in Europe.

== Geography ==
=== Location ===
The Teufelsley rises in the municipalities of Hönningen and Dümpelfeld. Its summit lies 1.8 kilometres south-southwest of the centre of Hönningen, 1.3 kilometres east of the village of Liers and 1 km north-northeast of the weekend residential area of Ommelbachtal.

The Dennbach stream, a tributary of Kesselinger Bach, flows past the Teufelsley to the east. The Kesselinger Bach empties into the Rhine tributary of the Ahr, 3.1 kilometres north of the hill in the Ahrbrück village of Brück.

=== Natural regions ===
The Teufelsley is in the natural region major unit group of the East Eifel (no. 27), in the major unit of the Ahr Eifel (272) and the subunit of the Southern Ahr Hills (272.3). Its western flank descends into the natural region of Dümpelfelder Ahrtal (272.20), which is part of the Middle Ahr Valley (272.2).

== Legend ==
Gottfried Kinkel's remarks about the Teufelsley included the following: "This quite fantastic rock rises on a narrow ridge, so that it looks as if it has been shattered by a massive blow from the east. There is no doubt that the legend, in which the devil built the castle here, high in the heavens, in defiance of God, was based on this observation of the rocks, which had already been made by people in the past with a natural astuteness. (...) This time, as always, it di not turn out well for the devil: his half-finished castle was smashed a single blow of the God's hand, and the rock really does give the impression of a Cyclopian castle ruin.." However, there is no historical evidence at all indicating that there was actually a castle on the Teufelsley and neither are any ruins discernible.
