= Hochstein (Eifel) =

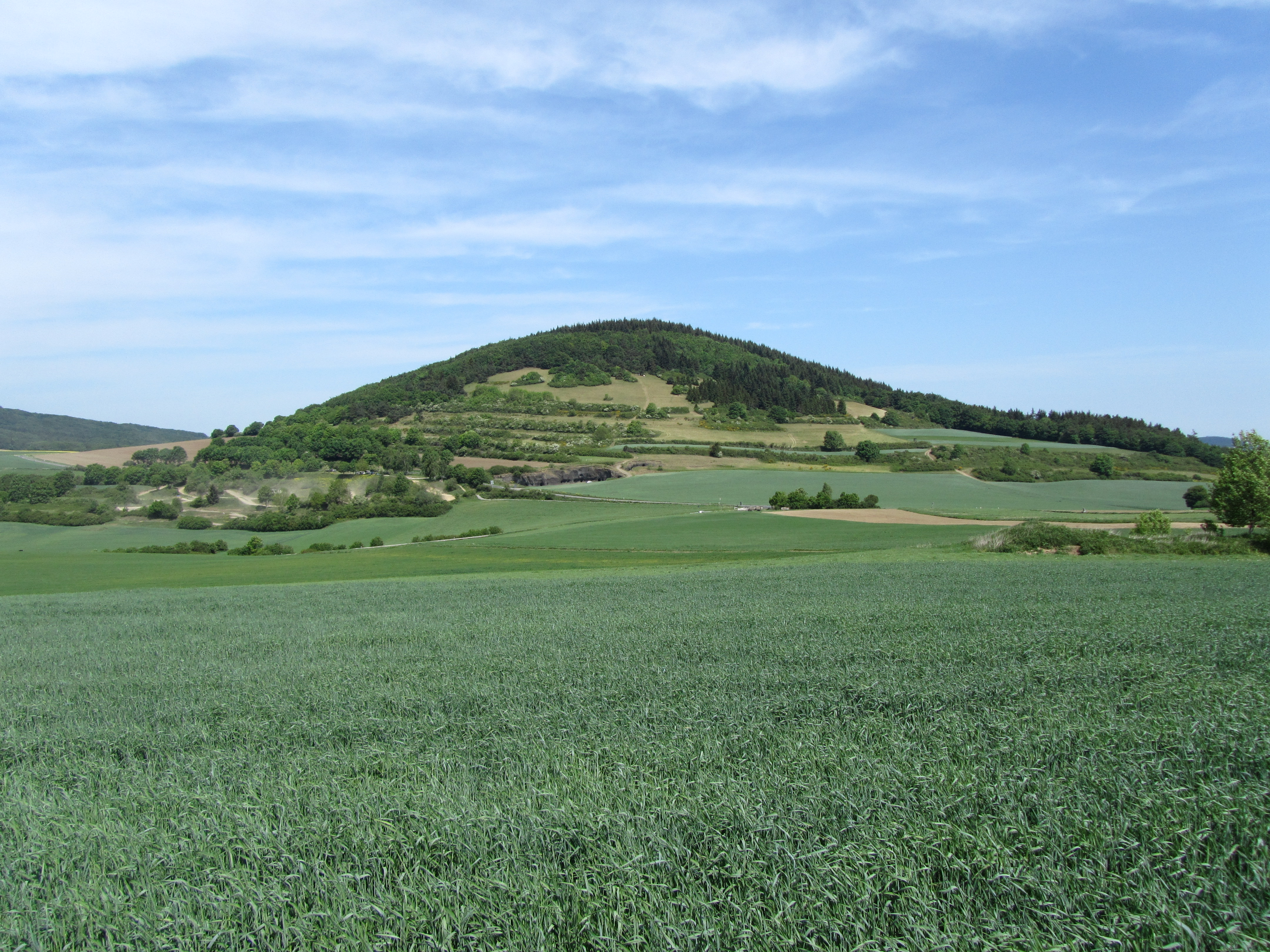
- The Hochstein from the SSW

Highest point
- Elevation: 563 m above sea level (NHN) (1,847.1 ft)
- Coordinates: 50°22′18″N 7°13′09″E

Geography
- Location within Rhineland-Palatinate
- Location: Near Obermendig; Mayen-Koblenz, Rhineland-Palatinate (Germany)
- Parent range: Eifel (High Eifel)

The Hochstein (also called the Kalberg or Kahler Berg and, formerly, the Forstberg) is a volcanic cone, 563 m above sea level (NHN), in the Eifel near Obermendig in the German state of Rhineland-Palatinate and county of Mayen-Koblenz.

== Geography ==
=== Location ===
The Hochstein rises in the High Eifel between the villages of Bell to the north-northeast and Ettringen to the south. Its summit and most of the hill lie in the western part of the borough of Mendig, the village of Obermendig extending as far as the eastern foot of the hill. The west and south flanks are located in the municipality of Ettringen. Northwest of the hill, along its municipal boundary with Ettringen, are the Roderhöfe which belong to Mendig. Somewhat to the north of the hill rises the Kellbach stream and, to the south, the Segbach, which both feed the Nette tributary of the Krufter Bach.

=== Natural regions ===
The Hochstein is part of the natural region major unit group, the Middle Rhine Region (No. 29), the major unit of Lower Middle Rhine Region (292), the minor unit of Laach Volcanoes (292.0) and the natural region of Ettringen Volcano Kuppen (292.01). To the west the terrain descends to the natural region of Nitz-Nette Forest (271.21), which is part of the major unit group, East Eifel (27), the major unit, Eastern High Eifel (271), and minor unit, Hohe Acht/Nitz-Nette Upland (271.2).

== Reserves ==
The majority of the Hochstein Hochstein Nature Reserve (CDDA-No. 163713; established 1983; 3,5113 km^{2}), lie on the hill, small elements of the protected area of Rhine-Ahr-Eifel (CDDA-No. 323834; 1980; 925,8651 km^{2}) and parts of a bird reserve, the Lower Middle Rhine Region (VSG No. 5609-401; 20.66 km^{2}).

== Hill name and Genoveva Cava ==
In Ettringen itself the name of the extinct volcano is the Kalberg, as depicted in a map dating to about 1809. According to a legend, Countess Palatine Genoveva of Brabant found refuge in the cave northwest of the summit during the Middle Ages, hence the name Genoveva Cave (also called the Hochstein Cave).

== Transport and leisure ==
The Landesstraße 82 from Bell to Ettringen via the Roderhöfen runs past the Hochstein to the west. On its southwest fland on this road is the motocross racetrack of Mcc Ettringen.

== Literature ==
W. Bömerich und F. Mangartz (Hrsg.): Der Hochstein – Führer zu einem Vulkan der Osteifel (Mendig, 1993)
