= Krawutschke Tower =

Coordinates: 50°41′41″N 6°26′29″E

The Krawutschke Tower (German: Krawutschketurm) is a 13 metre tall observation tower in the Hürtgenwald municipality in Germany, about one kilometer east of the village center of Bergstein, approximately 10 km south of Düren. The Krawutschke Tower is 400.5 m above sea level, situated on the Burgberg (Engl. castle mountain), which, during World War II, also had the Allied-given name Hill 400 due to its elevation. The Krawutschke Tower has three platforms, one above the other, each separated by three meters.

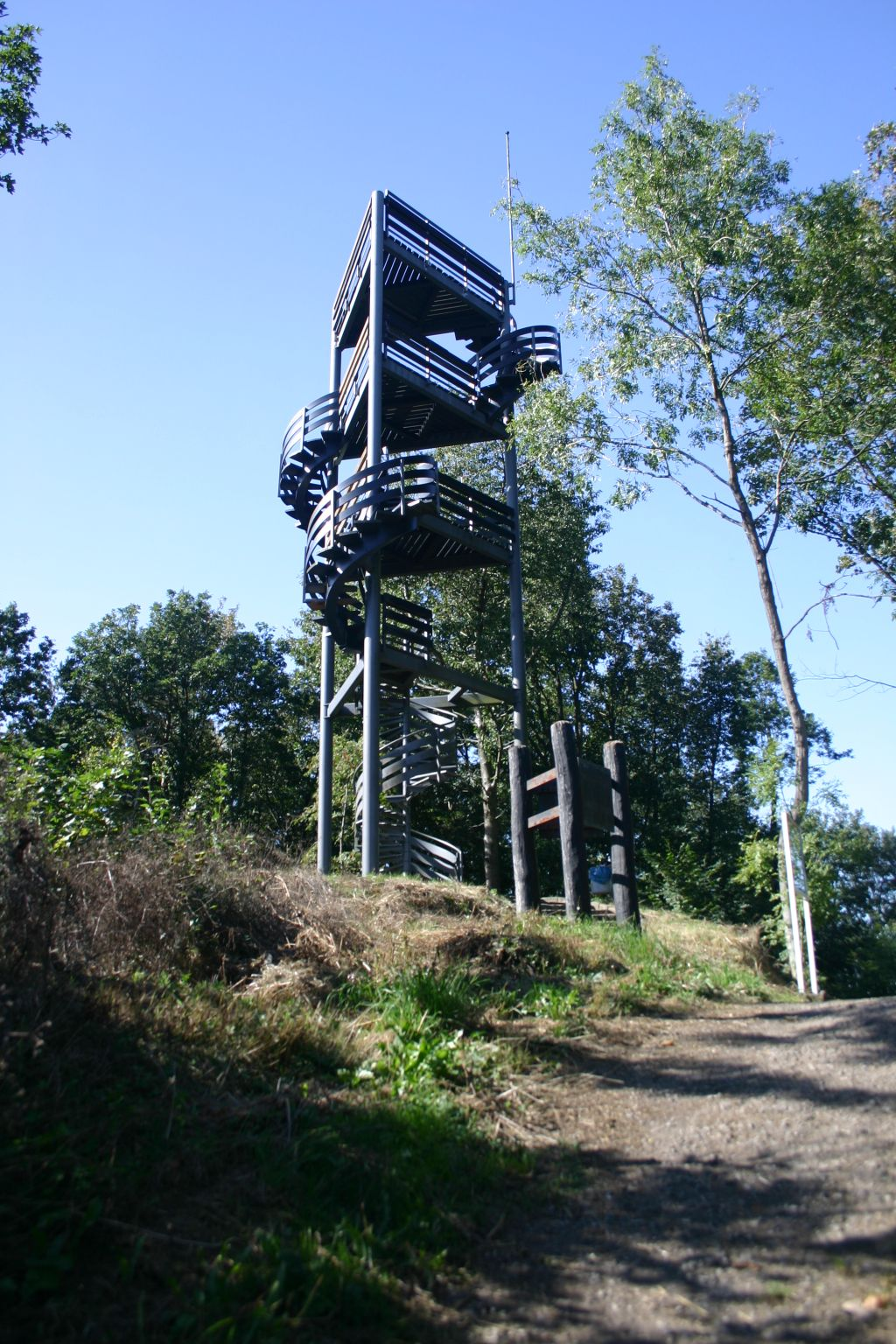
View from the South-East

On a clear day, one can see Cologne cathedral. Looking eastward, the Nideggen Castle is visible on the other side of the Rur valley. The tower has a panoramic view over the reservoir with the dam at Obermaubach.

In 1911 an observation tower was built on the ruins of the former Berenstein castle, the medieval name Berenstein eventually becoming today's Bergstein. In 1933 a new tower was erected, named Eifelwanderer Franz Krawutschke after the locally famous Eifel Club member, Franz Krawutschke (1862-1940). The tower, which also was being used as a fire lookout tower, was heavily damaged during World War II and then destroyed by a forest fire in 1945. It was rebuilt in 1972, financed by the municipality of Hürtgenwald, the Eifel Club, the district of Düren and the state of North Rhine-Westphalia.

From July 2005 to November 2006 the tower had to be closed for safety reasons. After renovation of a substantial part of the supporting wooden construction (costs about € 65,000), the tower is open to the public again.
