= High Eifel =

Coordinates: 50.3858°N 7.0111°E

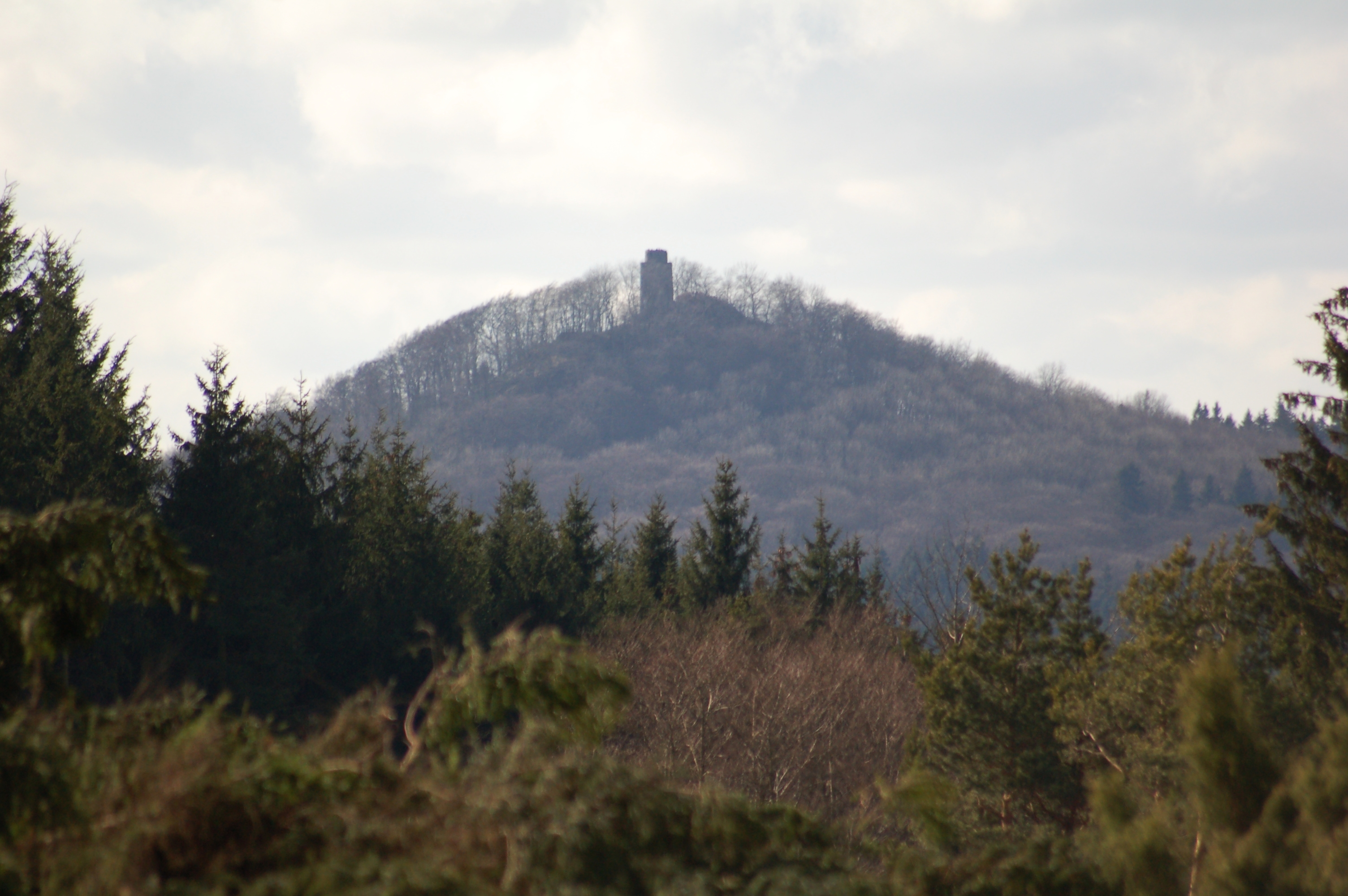
The Hohe Acht, highest mountain of the High Eifel and Eifel range itself

The High Eifel (German: Hocheifel (Ost) or Hohe Eifel) forms part of the Eifel Mountains in the German state of Rhineland-Palatinate.

The landscape here between Adenau, Mendig and Daun rises to a height of 747 m. The region is not to be confused with the western Hocheifel, better known as the Schnee Eifel. Nürburg Castle and the famous Nürburgring racing track are located in the northwest of the area.

== Climate ==
Despite being between 600 m and 700 m high the High Eifel lies in the rain shadow of the Schneifel to the west. Its annual precipitation lies between 800 mm and 1000 mm.

== Mountains/castles ==
- Hohe Acht (747 m)
- Nürburg Castle (678 m)
- Hochkelberg (675 m)
- Dreiser Höhe (611 m)

== See also ==
- Maifeld
- Pellenz
- Vordereifel
- Vulkan Eifel
