= Zitter Forest =

Forest in western Europe

Coordinates: 50°25′18″N 6°29′15″E

The Zitter Forest (German: Zitterwald) is located in the Eifel region in the German district of Euskirchen (North Rhine-Westphalia) and in the Belgian province of Liège (Wallonia). Its highest point is 692 m above sea level (NN).

The Zitter Forest lies in the North Eifel between Hellenthal (north), Dahlem (east), Kronenburg (south) and the Belgian village of Büllingen (west). The Zitter Forest is part of the Hohes Venn – Eifel Nature Park. To the north the Eifel National Park borders on the Zitter Forest; to the south the river Kyll is the border with the Schnee Eifel.

In the thinly populated and predominantly wooded uplands of the Zitter Forest between 500 and 692 m above sea level (NN) lie the sources of the Olef, Urft and Kyll. Its highest elevation is on the Weißer Stein (692 m; with ski slopes) southwest of Udenbreth; amongst the other hills within the Zitter Forest are the Bärbelkreuz (662.8 m), Hühnerhöhe (659.9 m), Kamberg (637.8 m).

The Hellenthal villages and settlements — like Giescheid, Miescheid, Neuhaus, Ramscheid and Udenbreth — in the northern part of the Zitter Forest belong to the highest parishes in the Rhineland.

The Zitter Forest is one of the last habitats of the wildcat in Germany.

The Eifel-Bärbelkreuz transmission tower (Sendeturm Eifel-Bärbelkreuz) is within the Zitter Forest.
