= Hochkelberg =

Mountain in Rhineland-Palatinate, Germany

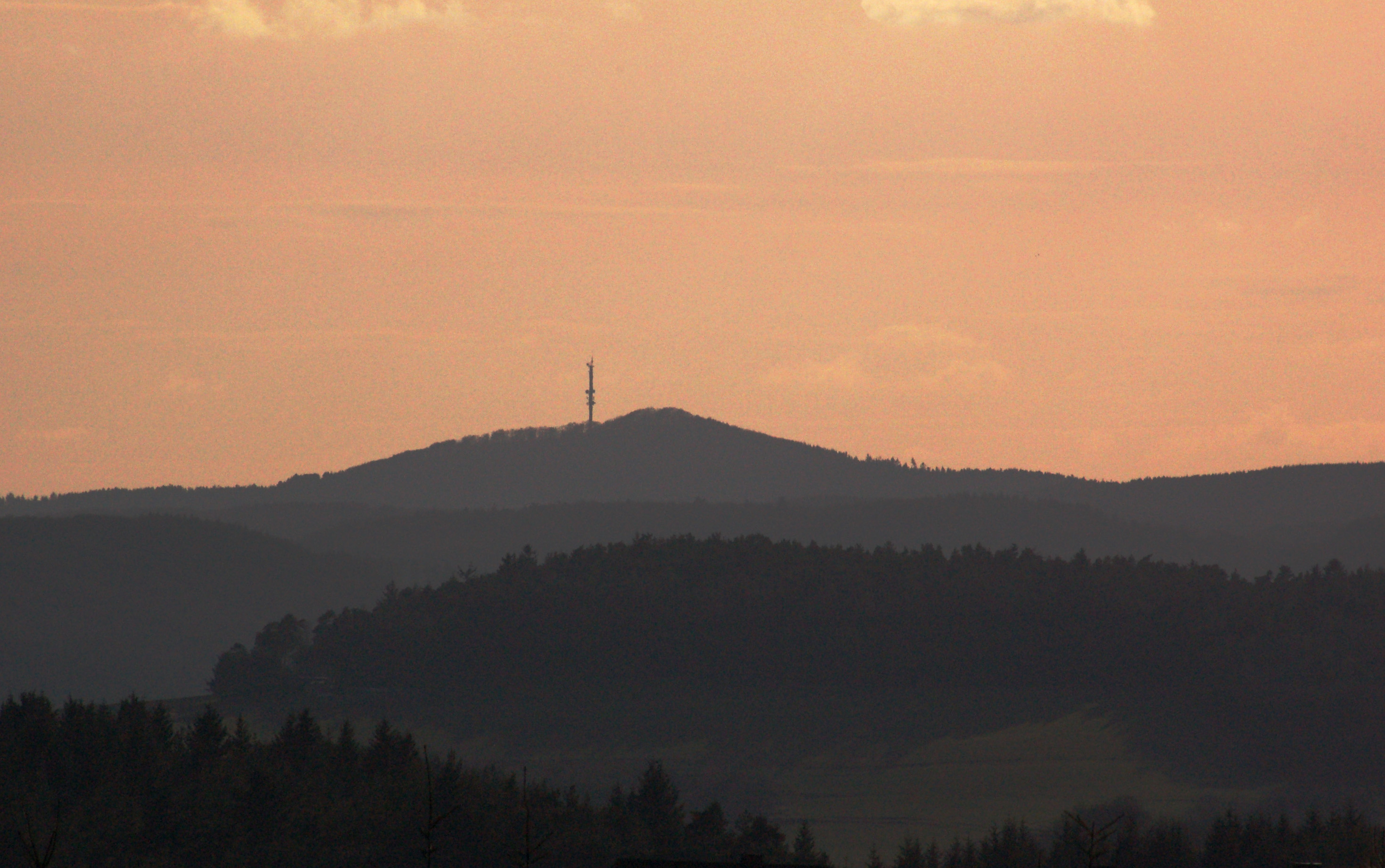
- The summit of the Hochkelberg seen from Gänsehals

Highest point
- Elevation: 674.9 m (2,214 ft)
- Coordinates: 50°16′22″N 6°57′10″E

Geography
- Location within Rhineland-Palatinate
- Location: Rheinland-Pfalz, Germany
- Parent range: Eifel

At 674.9 metres (2,214 ft) the Hochkelberg is one of the ten highest mountains in the Vulkan Eifel in Germany. It is a former stratovolcano, at the southern foot of which lies the Mosbrucher Weiher, an explosion crater lake or maar. Below the summit of the Hochkelberg is a transmission tower.

Originally the mountain which is visible today lay 200 metres below the surface. When the region was uplifted the outer layers were carried away leaving the hard basaltic core.

The slopes of the Hochkelberg are covered today with dense beech woods with a variety of species. The ruins of Roman buildings may also be seen here.
