= Volcanic Eifel =

Region of volcanic craters in Germany

Coordinates: 50°17′N 7°00′E

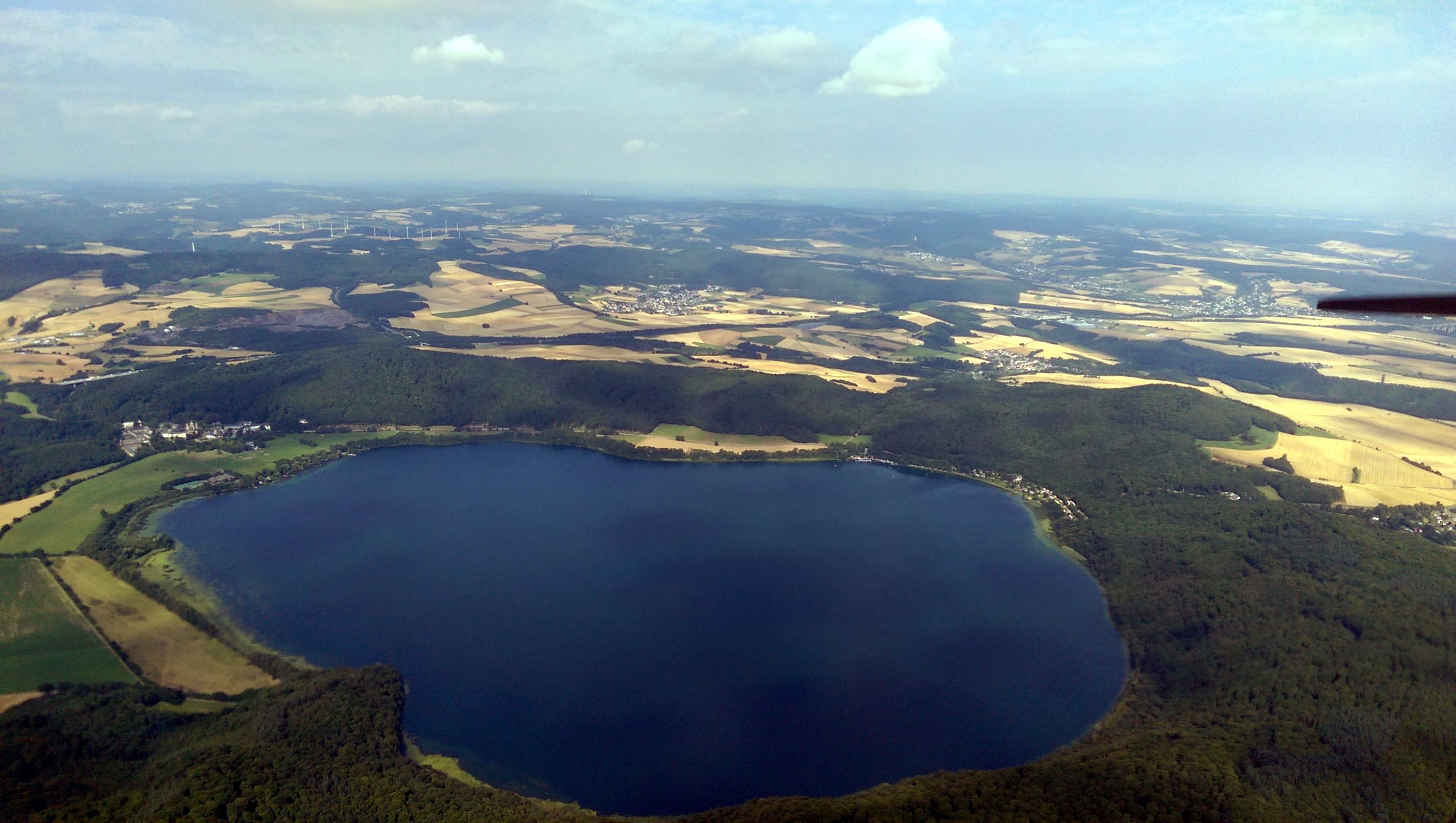
The Laacher See, the largest volcanic crater lake in Central Europe near Andernach

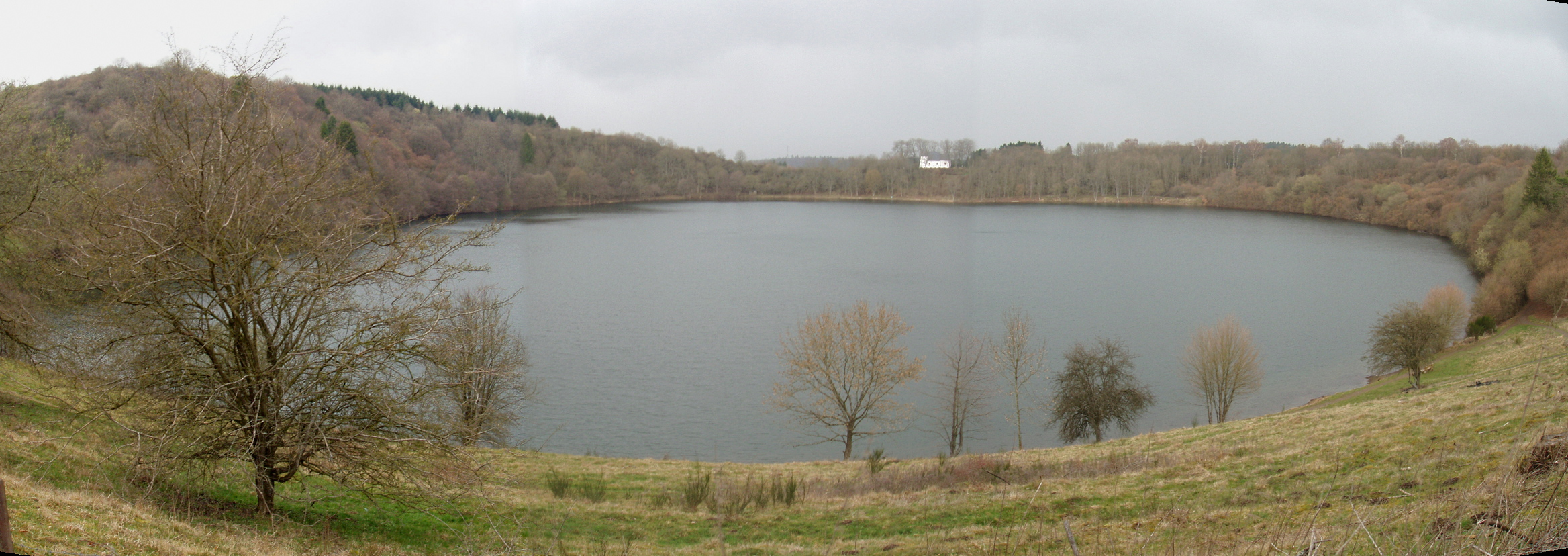
The Weinfelder Maar or Totenmaar, one of three maars near Daun

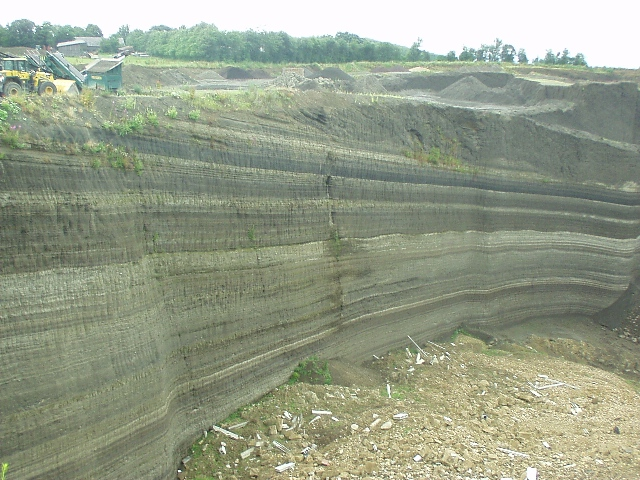
Tephra layers in a quarry near Weibern in the Brohl Valley

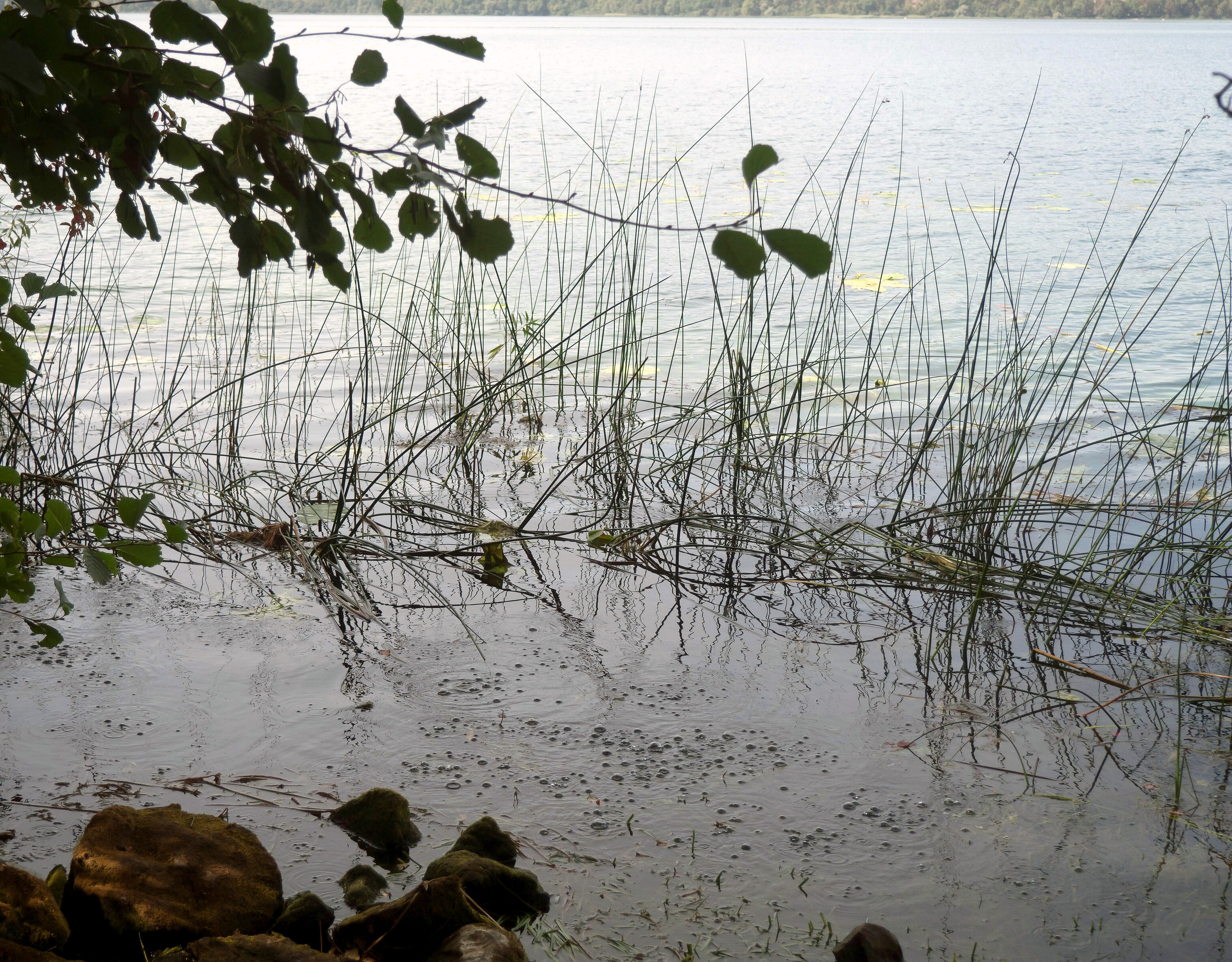
Mofettas on the southeastern shore of the Laacher See

The Volcanic Eifel or Vulkan Eifel (German: Vulkaneifel) consists of three areas of volcanic activity, known as the West Eifel, High Eifel, and East Eifel volcanic fields. Volcanic Eifel is a region in the Eifel Mountains in Germany that is defined to a large extent by its volcanic geological history. Characteristic of the volcanic fields are their typical explosion crater lakes or maars, and numerous other signs of volcanic activity such as volcanic tuffs, lava streams and volcanic craters, for example the Laacher See. The Volcanic Eifel is still volcanically active today. One sign of this activity is the escaping gases in the Laacher See.

== Geographical location ==
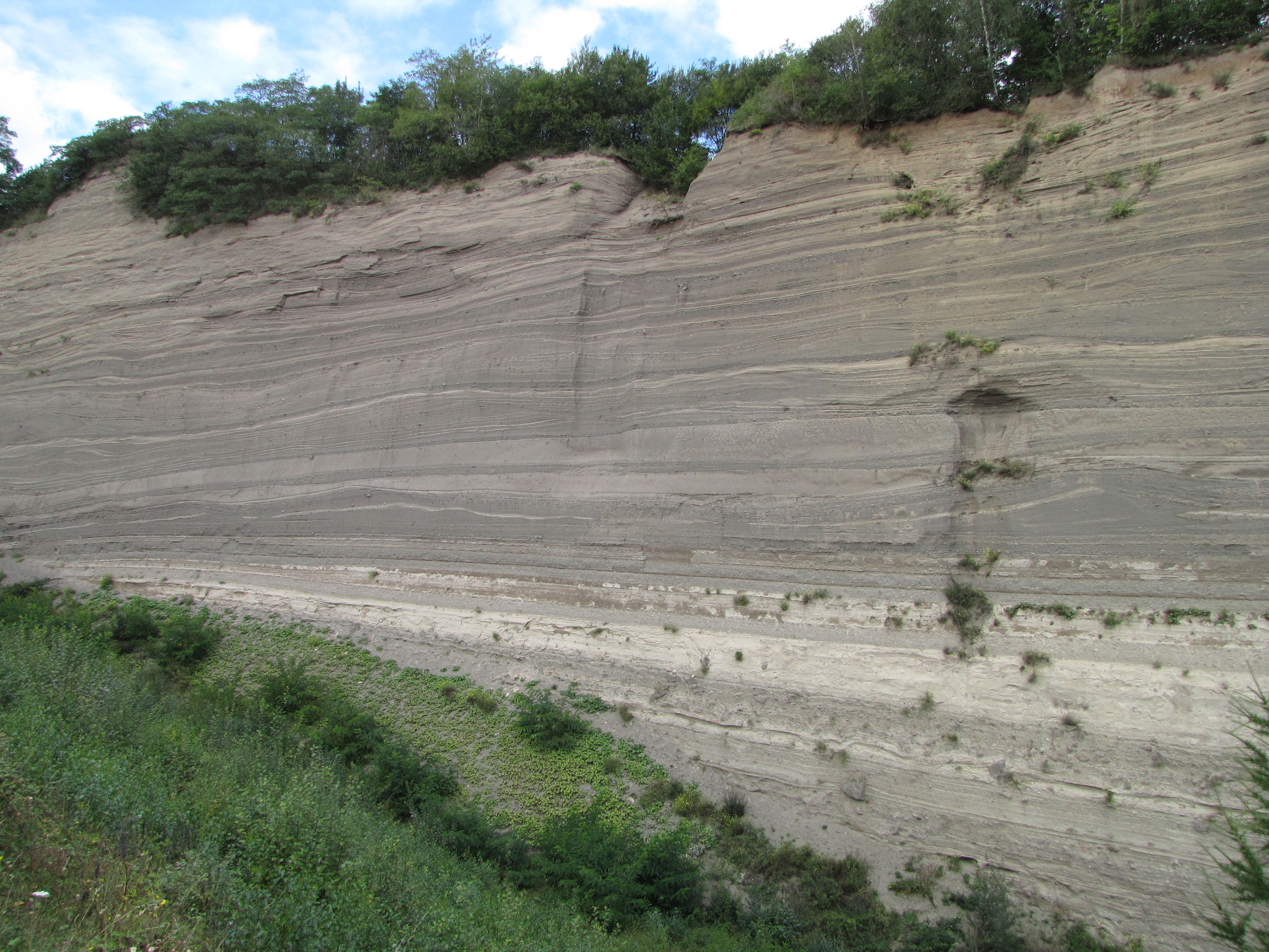
The Wingertsbergwand gives an idea of the amount of volcanic ash ejected during the eruption of the Laacher See volcano.

The Volcanic Eifel stretches from the Rhine to the Wittlich Depression. It is bordered in the south and southwest by the South Eifel, in the west by Luxembourg and Belgian Ardennes and in the north by the North Eifel including the Hohes Venn. To the east the Rhine forms its geographical boundary, with no volcanicity immediately beyond it.

The Volcanic Eifel is divided into three natural regions:

- Volcanic West Eifel (West Eifel Volcanic Field): Manderscheid, Daun, Gerolstein, Obere Kyll, Hillesheim (within the parish of Nohn)
- Volcanic High Eifel (High Eifel Volcanic Field): (Adenau, Kelberg, Ulmen and Nohn)
- Volcanic East Eifel (East Eifel Volcanic Field): (Brohltal, Vordereifel, Mendig, Pellenz)

The centre of the Volcanic Eifel is the region around Daun and Manderscheid and the areas within the Mayen-Koblenz district.

The landscape of the Volcanic Eifel is dominated by recent volcanism. Volcanic craters, thick pumice and basalt layers and maars create a diverse landscape that clearly witnesses to very recent events in geological terms.

The entire Volcanic Eifel covers an area of about 2,000 km^{2} (770 sq mi) and as of 2007 has a population of about 200,000.

=== Volcanoes ===
The following volcanoes belong to the Eifel, sorted by height in metres (m) above sea level (Normalhöhennull, NHN):

- Ernstberg (also: Erresberg), 699.9 m (2,300 ft), county of Vulkaneifel – west
- Scharteberg, 691.4 m (2,270 ft), county of Vulkaneifel; with the Eifel Transmitter (SWR) – west
- Prümscheid, 681 m (2,230 ft), county of Vulkaneifel – not volcanic (eponymous quartzite ridge; other summits being the Scharteberg and Dietzenley)
- Hochkelberg, 674.9 m (2,210 ft), county of Vulkaneifel; with a transmission mast on its south summit – Tertiary
- Nerother Kopf, 651.7 m (2,140 ft), county of Vulkaneifel; with the castle ruins of the Freudenkoppe – west
- Dietzenley, 617.6 m (2,030 ft), county of Vulkaneifel; with a wooden observation tower – west
- Arensberg, approximately 590 m (1,940 ft), county of Vulkaneifel – Tertiary
- Hochsimmer, 587.9 m (1,930 ft), county of Mayen-Koblenz – east
- Gänsehals, 573.3 m (1,880 ft), county of Mayen-Koblenz – east
- Engelner Kopf, 575.1 m (1,890 ft), county of Ahrweiler (near Kempenich-Engeln) – east
- Hochstein, 563 m (1,850 ft), county of Mayen-Koblenz – east
- Steineberger Ley, 557.8 m (1,830 ft), county of Vulkaneifel; with a Volcano Information Platform (observation tower) – Tertiary
- Rockeskyller Kopf, 554.6 m (1,820 ft), county of Vulkaneifel – west
- Hoher List, 549.1 m (1,800 ft), county of Vulkaneifel; with the Hoher List Observatory – west
- Wartgesberg, approximately 475 m (1,560 ft), county of Vulkaneifel (near Strohn) – west
- Veitskopf, 428.1 m (1,400 ft), county of Ahrweiler; near Laacher See; with an observation tower, the Lydia Tower – east
- Ettringer Bellberg, 427.5 m (1,400 ft), county of Mayen-Koblenz (south of Ettringen) – east
- Karmelenberg, 372.5 m (1,220 ft), county of Mayen-Koblenz – east
- Mayener Bellberg, 363.2 m (1,190 ft), county of Mayen-Koblenz (north of Mayen) – east
- Korretsberg, 295 m (970 ft), county of Mayen-Koblenz (near Kruft) – east

=== Laacher See ===
Of particular note is the volcanic caldera known as Laacher See, the site of an eruption around 12,900 years ago that had an estimated VEI of 6.

== Geopark and museums ==
- Vulkanland Eifel National Geopark
- Volcano Museum, Daun
- Volcano House, Strohn
- German Volcano Museum, Mendig

== Geology ==
The tephras deposited by past eruptions of the Volcanic Eifel are lithological deposits that are radiometrically dateable via argon-argon dating of K-feldspar grains. These have in turn been utilised to ascertain the ages of climatic changes such as transitions from glacial to interglacial states during the Pleistocene.

== Future activity ==
There is thought that future eruptions may occur in the Eifel, because:

- Each year the Eifel rises by about a millimetre.
- Geophysicists found that crust under the Eifel is thinner than most continental crust, suggesting that under the Eifel is a hot zone where magma is rising.
- Persistent small earthquakes and underground heating.
- Map of flood lake that may happen if the Rhine is blocked by a voluminous eruption in the Eifel

In 2020, Professor Kreemer noted that Eifel was the only region within an area of Europe studied where ground motion happened at significantly higher levels than expected. It is possible that such movements originate from a rising magma plume. This activity does not imply an immediate eruptive danger, but might suggest an increase in volcanic and seismic activity in the region.
