= Dahlem, North Rhine-Westphalia =

Dahlem
- Municipality
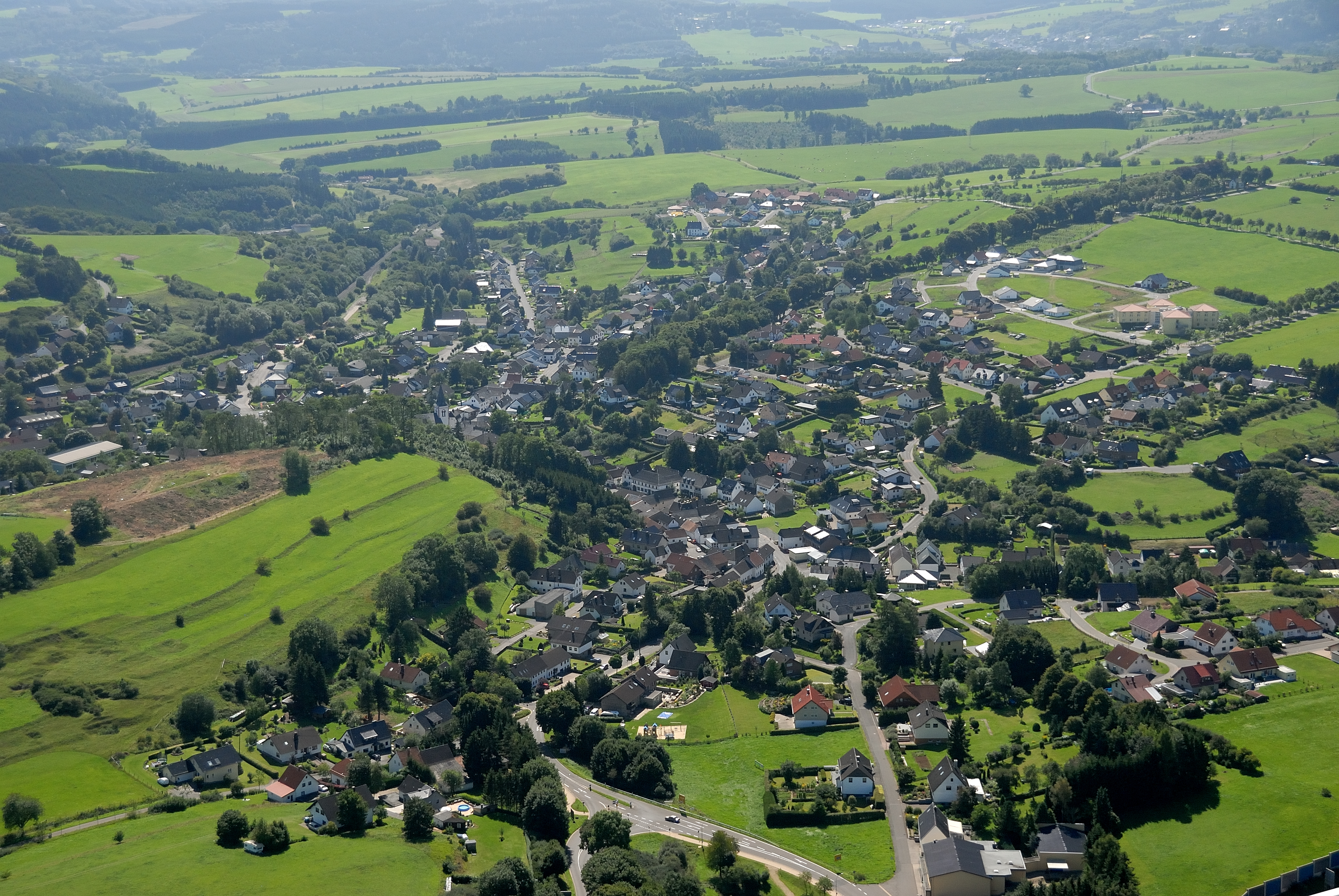

- Flag Coat of arms

- Location of Dahlem within Euskirchen district
- Interactive map of Dahlem
- Location within Germany Location within North Rhine-Westphalia
- Coordinates: 50°23′N 06°33′E
- Country: Germany
- State: North Rhine-Westphalia
- Admin. region: Köln
- District: Euskirchen

Government
  - Mayor (2020–25): Jan Lembach (CDU)

Area
  - Total: 95.18 km^{2} (36.75 sq mi)
- Elevation: 539 m (1,768 ft)

Population (2025-12-31)
  - Total: 4,438
  - Density: 46.63/km^{2} (120.8/sq mi)
- Time zone: UTC+01:00 (CET)
  - Summer (DST): UTC+02:00 (CEST)
- Postal codes: 53949
- Dialling codes: 02447
- Vehicle registration: EU
- Website: www.dahlem.de

Dahlem (German pronunciation: [ˈdaːləm]) is a municipality in the district of Euskirchen, in the state of North Rhine-Westphalia, Germany. It has the lowest population density and population of all the state's municipalities. It is located in the Eifel hills, approx. 35 km south-west of Euskirchen. The small medieval town Kronenburg is part of the municipality.

== Geography ==
Dahlem is located in the northern Eifel region in the High Fens – Eifel Nature Park, between Blankenheim in the northeast and Stadtkyll in the southwest. The Kyll flows through the region from the Glaadtbach. The Heidenköpfe summits lie in the Ripsdorfer forest to the east.

== Population ==
Historical population

| Year | Pop. | ±% p.a. |
|---|---|---|
| 1965 | 3,874 | — |
| 1970 | 3,941 | +0.34% |
| 1975 | 3,862 | −0.40% |
| 1980 | 3,735 | −0.67% |
| 1985 | 3,766 | +0.17% |
| 1990 | 3,935 | +0.88% |
| 1995 | 4,161 | +1.12% |

| Year | Pop. | ±% p.a. |
|---|---|---|
| 2000 | 4,277 | +0.55% |
| 2005 | 4,282 | +0.02% |
| 2010 | 4,116 | −0.79% |
| 2015 | 4,236 | +0.58% |
| 2020 | 4,301 | +0.31% |
| 2025 | 4,438 | +0.63% |

Source: Landesdatabank Nordrhein-Westfalen
