= Prümscheid =

- Location within Rhineland-Palatinate

Highest point
- Elevation: 674.7 m above sea level (NHN) (2,214 ft)
- Coordinates: 50°10′02″N 6°42′06″E

Geography
- Location: Wallenborn, Vulkaneifel, Rhineland-Palatinate (Germany)
- Parent range: Eifel

The Prümscheid is a mountain, 674.7 m above sea level (NHN), in the Eifel mountains in Germany. It is located near Wallenborn in the county of Vulkaneifel and is one of the highest peaks in the Eifel. Nearby villages are Salm, Büscheich and Wallenborn.
