= Veitskopf =

Mountain in Germany

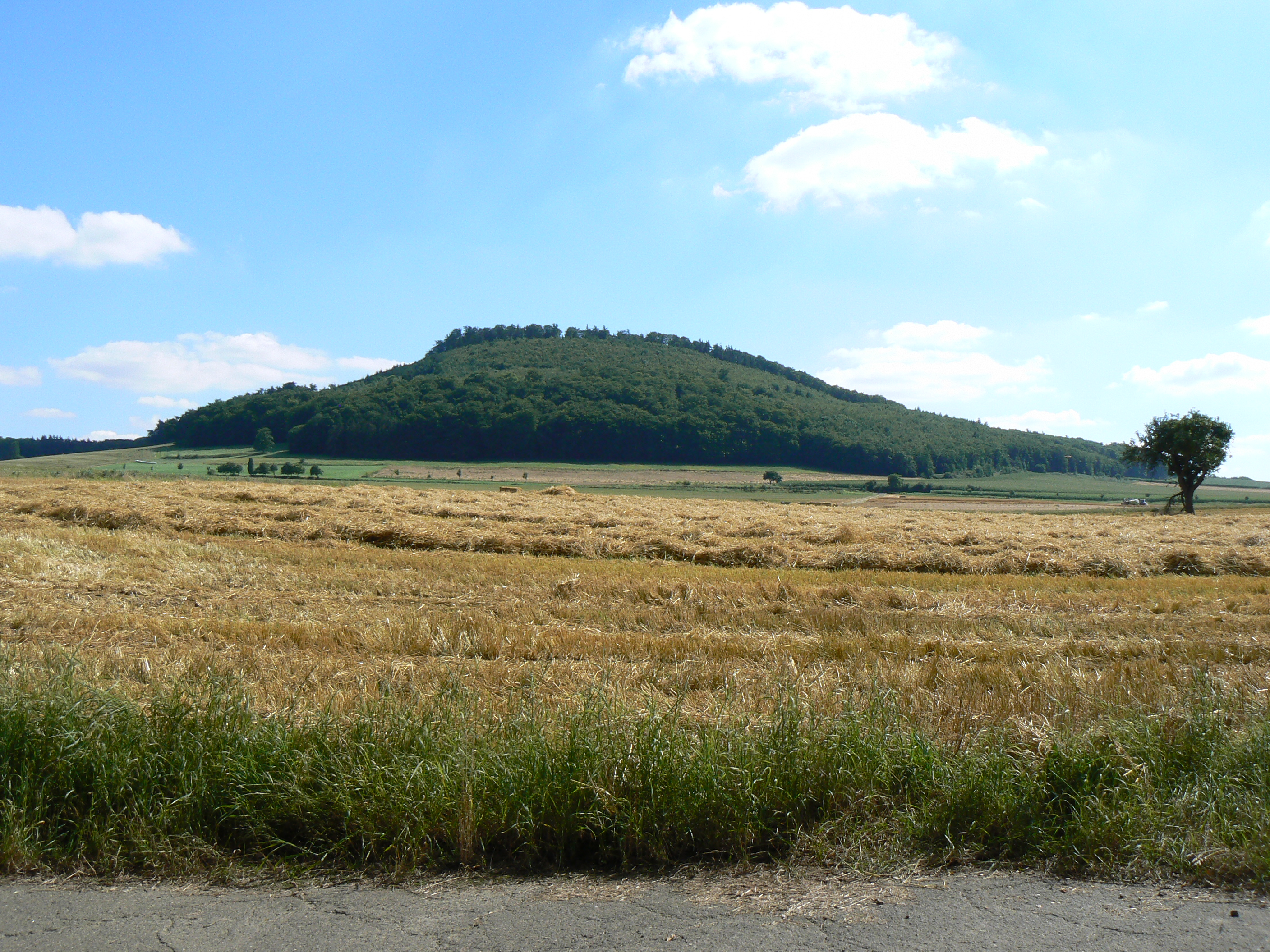
- The Veitskopf near Wassenach

Highest point
- Elevation: 428 m above sea level (NHN) (1,404 ft)
- Coordinates: 50°25′48″N 7°15′51″E

Geography
- Location within Rhineland-Palatinate
- Location: Rhineland-Palatinate
- Parent range: Eifel

Geology
- Mountain type: cinder cone
- Rock type: Basalt

The Veitskopf is a hill, 428 m above sea level (NHN), (Note: The name and height of the hill differs on the different maps produced by the Conservation Office of Rhineland-Palatinate. On the DTK 1:5,000 scale map it is called the Feithskopf and its height is given as 428.1 m hoch, on the DTK 1:25,000 scale map it is called the Veitskopf and its height is shown as 427.8 m.) in the Eifel mountains of Germany. It is located in the county of Ahrweiler in the state of Rhineland-Palatinate. It rises north of the lake of Laacher See in the area of the village of Wassenach.

The Veitskopf is the cinder cone of a volcano that erupted during the Quaternary period. Because there are no reference strata, its age cannot be accurately estimated. The Veitskopf produced three lava flows, of which the first and easily the largest spread out northwards from the crater rim in the west. Because the neighbouring valley, the Gleeser Tal, was formed after the eruption of the Veitskopf, this lava flow stands above the present valley and forms the so-called Mauerley. The two lava streams that run in a southerly direction are nowhere near as large and were first identified from magnetic surveys because they were covered by a layer of pumice. At the top of the Veitskopf is the Lydia Tower which enables an all-round view that includes the Laacher See, the Brohltal valley and even the Siebengebirge hills.
