= Goose Neck Tower =

Concrete radio tower in Germany

Coordinates: 50°23′50″N 7°12′15″E

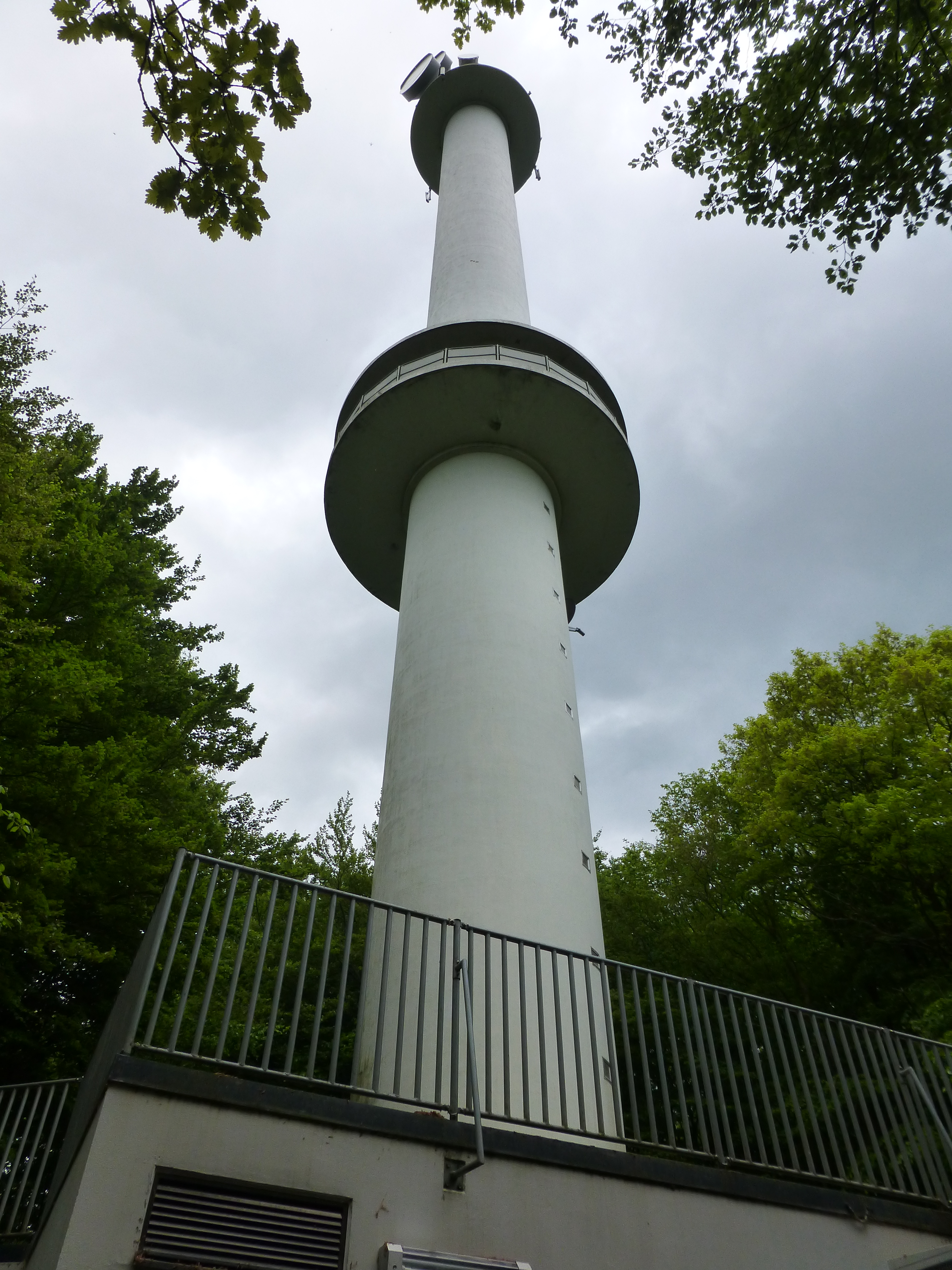

Goose Neck Tower (Gänsehalsturm) is an 87-metre reinforced concrete radio tower near Bell and Mendig in western Germany. Built in 1976, it serves as an internal radio relay link for German electric and natural gas public utility company RWE.

Goose Neck Tower is one of RWE's few radio towers built in concrete. At the height of 24 meters, there is an observation deck open to tourists. It is named after the mountain where it is located: Gänsehals ("Goose Neck").

Close to the summit of the Goose Neck, there is a old lookout tower and a smaller hut. These were built in 1889/90 by the local hunting club, Jadgverein Gänsehals. This site was open to the public until 1960, when it moved into private hands. The Goose Neck Tower and lookout hut are on a walking route: the Eifel-Traumpfad Waldseepfad Rieden wandern. The ridge on which the tower stands may have been part of a natural ancient land border. The amateur radio group Die Packet-Radio-Gruppe Mittelrhein operated radio repeaters from the Goose Neck from 1987 until 2025.
