= Schneifel =

Coordinates: 50.2659°N 6.3748°E

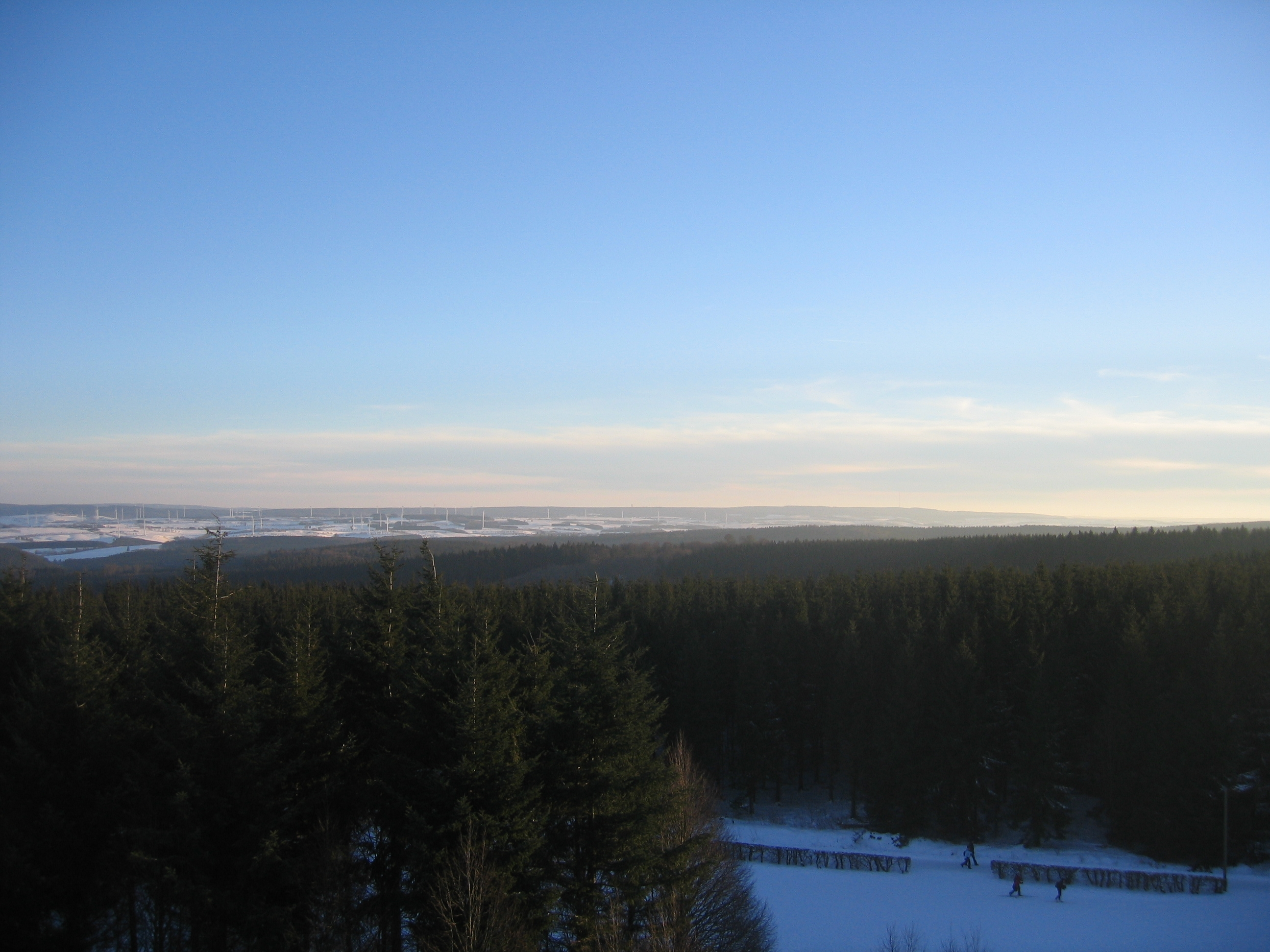
The rather unassuming, long ridge of the Schneifel viewed from the Weißer Stein

The Schneifel is a range of low mountains, up to 699.1 m above sea level (NHN), in the western part of the Eifel in Germany, near the Belgian border. It runs from Brandscheid near Prüm in a northeasterly direction to Ormont. The name Schneifel has nothing to do with the German words Schnee (snow) and Eifel. It is derived from the former dialect of this region and means something like Schneise ("swathe"). This swathe ran over the mountains. The term was "Germanised" during the Prussian era and the term Schnee-Eifel ("Snow Eifel") was born, albeit referring to a larger area.

Winters in this low mountainous region are unusually cold and snowy for western and parts of central Europe and snow lies here for longer than anywhere else in the Eifel. As a result, the winter sports season is longer here than in the surrounding region. The highest point of the Schneifel is the 699.1-metre-high Schwarze Mann ("Black Man"), which is also the third highest point of the Eifel range after the Hohe Acht and the Erresberg (Ernstberg). There is a winter sports area on the Schwarze Mann with the same name.

The Schneifel is covered along its entire length by the ruins of bunkers which formed part of the Siegfried Line.

On the heights of the Schneifel is the former US radar station, Prüm Air Station, and the Schnee Eifel transmission tower for terrestrial TV and VHF which, with a height of 224 m is clearly visible for miles.
