= North Eifel =

The North Eifel (German: Nordeifel), the northern part of the Eifel, a low mountain range in Germany and East Belgium, comprises the following six sub-regions:

- Venn Foreland,
- Hohes Venn,
- Rur Eifel,
- Limestone Eifel,
- Our Valley and
- High Eifel.

All elements belong to the Hohes Venn – Eifel Nature Park.

The raised bog of the Hohes Venn is particularly noteworthy. It was designated as a world heritage site by UNESCO. The Eifel Lake Plateau with the second largest dam in Germany, the Rur Valley Dam, lies in the centre of the North Eifel.

Also within the North Eifel are:

- Eifel National Park,
- Monschau Hedegerow Country (Monschauer Heckenland),
- Kermeter,
- Hürtgen Forest and
- Zitter Forest.
