= High Fens – Eifel Nature Park =

Cross-border nature park in North-West Europe

- Naturpark Hohes Venn – Eifel
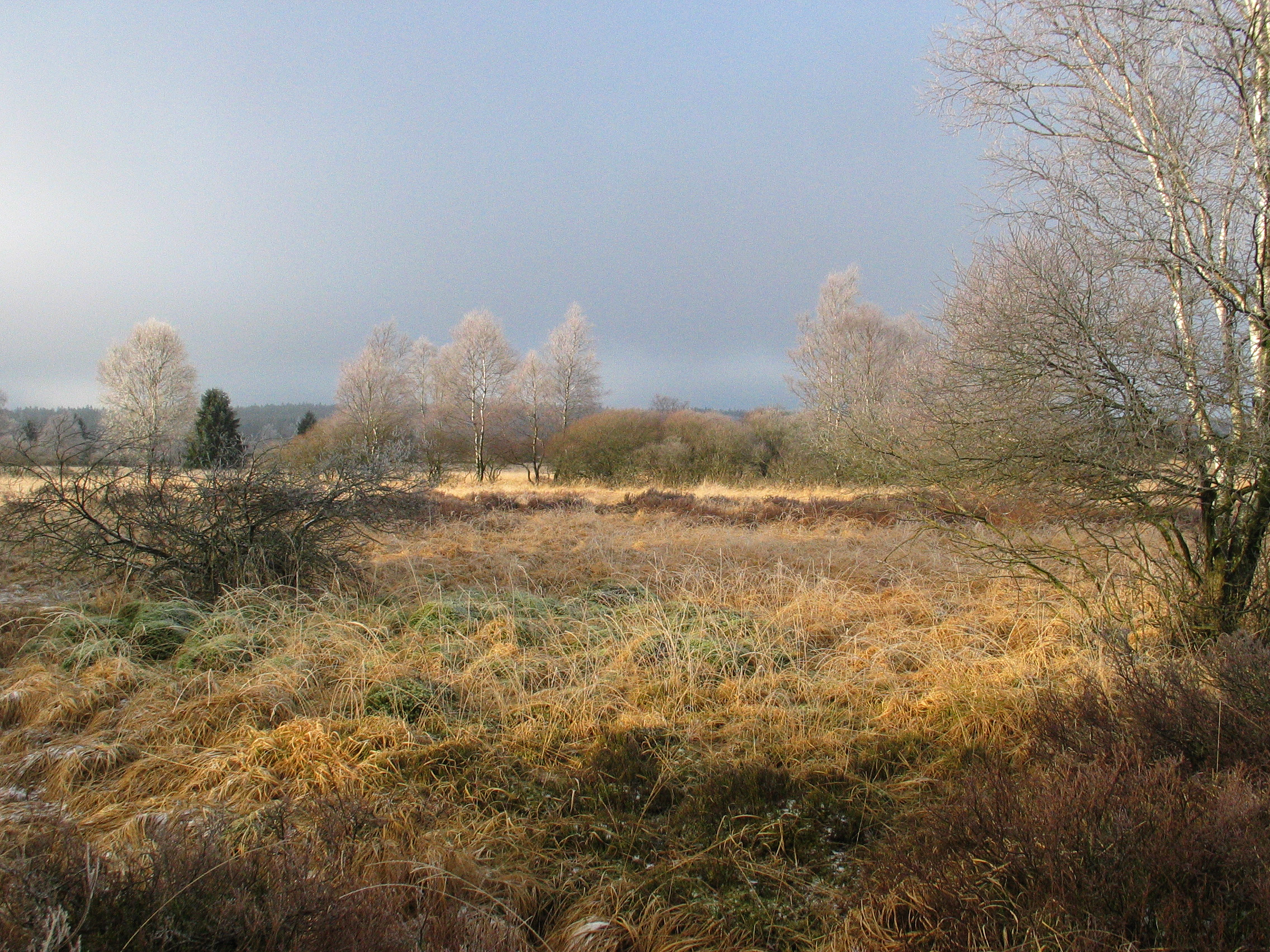
- Landscape in the Hohes Venn

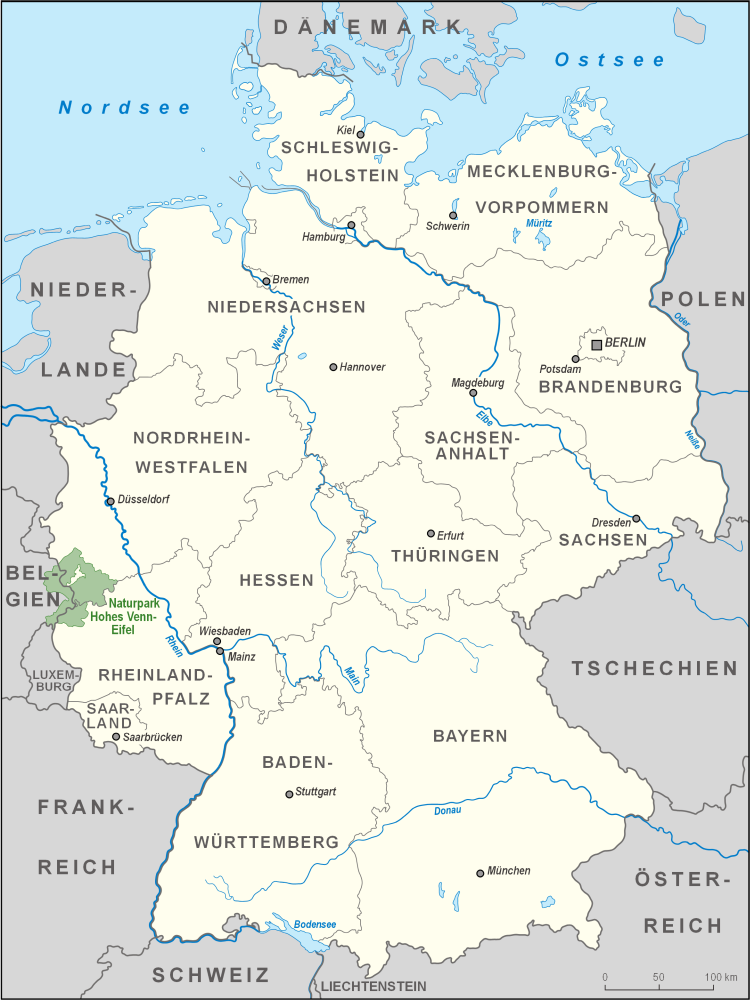
- Location of the Hohes Venn–Eifel Nature Park in Germany
- Location: North Rhine-Westphalia and Rhineland-Palatinate, Germany; Liège, Belgium
- Nearest city: Schleiden, Germany
- Coordinates: 50.508°N 6.37°E
- Area: 2,485 km^{2} (959 sq mi)
- Established: 1960
- Website: www.naturpark-hohesvenn-eifel.de

Ramsar Wetland
- Official name: Les Hautes Fagnes
- Designated: 24 March 2003
- Reference no.: 1405

The German-Belgian High Fens – Eifel Nature Park (German: Naturpark Hohes Venn – Eifel), often called the North Eifel Nature Park (Naturpark Nord Eifel), is a cross-border nature park with elements in the German federal states of North Rhine-Westphalia and Rhineland-Palatinate as well as the Belgian province of Liège. It has a total area of 2,485 km^{2} (959 sq mi).

The nature park lies between Langerwehe and Eupen in the north and Bad Münstereifel, Prüm and Sankt Vith in the south and covers six regions: the Rur Eifel, the High Eifel, the Limestone Eifel, the Our valley, the Venn Foreland and the Hohes Venn, a raised bog and heath landscape, remnants of the last ice age 7,500 years ago.

The geographical description North Eifel in its narrowest sense only covers the Eifel landscape between Zitter Forest in the south and Aachen in the north, Bad Münster Eifel to the east and over the Rur Eifel to the Belgian border in the west. The Hohe Venn is geographically seen as a separate natural region within the whole Eifel area, but is nevertheless included in the nature park.

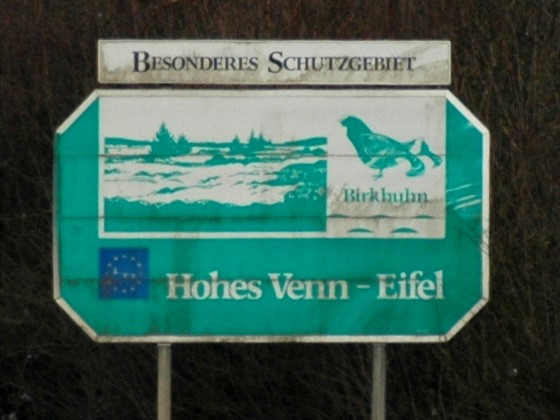
German sign in Belgium

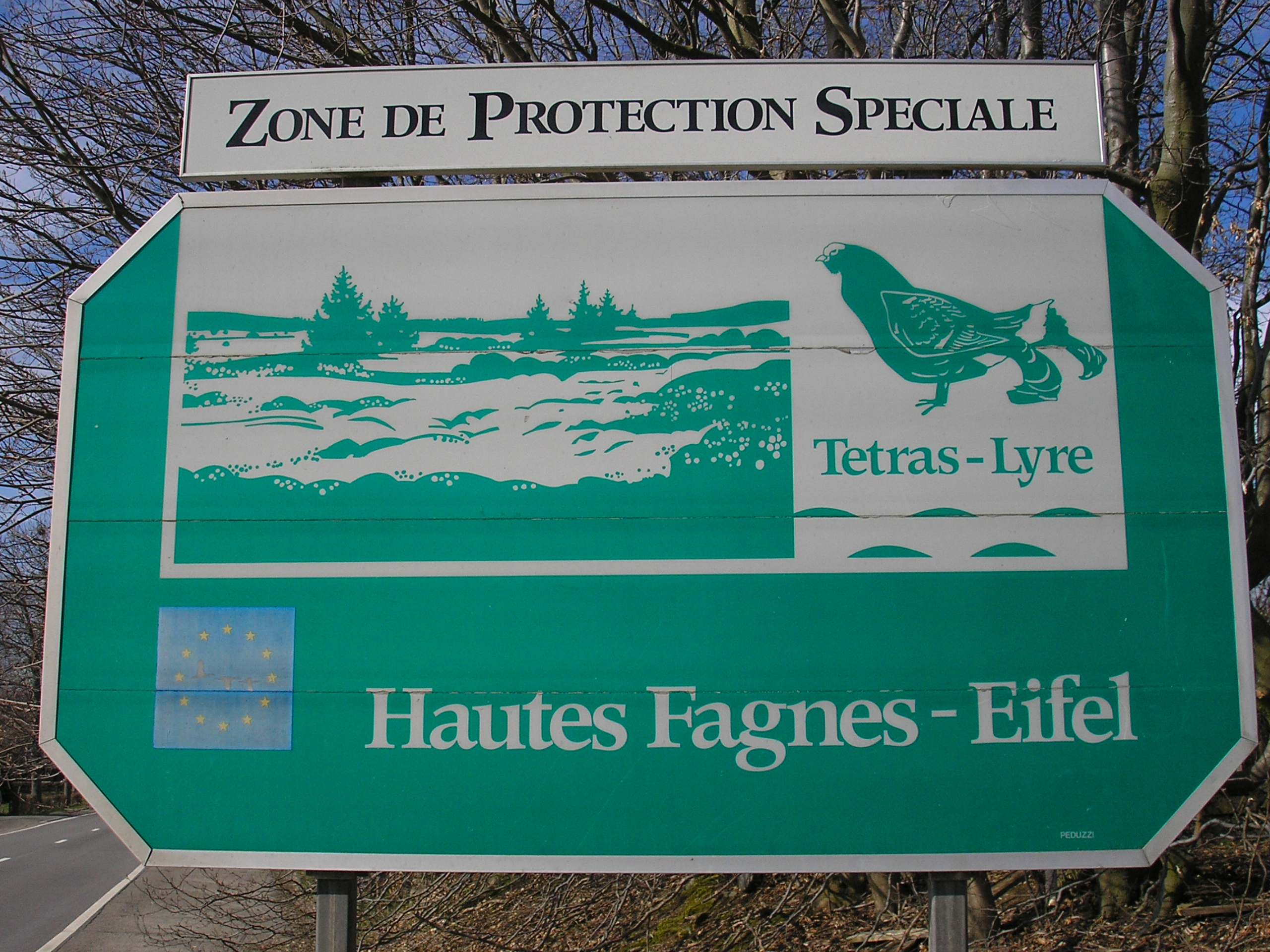
French sign in Belgium

== History ==
In 1960, the president of the now-defunct administrative district of Aachen, Hubert Schmitt-Degenhardt, founded the North Eifel Nature Park. In 1971 it was merged with the Belgian Parc Naturel Hautes Fagnes to become the Hohes Venn – Eifel Nature Park. The emblem of the nature park is the black grouse.

In August 2026, a large wildfire ravaged about 3,000 hectares (7,400 acres) of the High Fens.

== Eifel National Park ==
In the middle of the nature park, largely around the former Belgian Army military training area at Vogelsang and the Rur Dam, is the Eifel National Park founded in 2004 and expanded after the withdrawal of the Belgians on 1 January 2006.

== Literature ==
- Baedeker Reiseführer Belgien

== See also ==
- List of nature parks in Germany
- Our Natural Park
