= Ellerbach =

Ellerbach may refer to:

- Ellerbach (Altenau), a tributary of the Altenau in North Rhine-Westphalia, Germany
- Ellerbach (Moselle), a tributary of the Moselle in Rhineland-Palatinate, Germany
- Ellerbach (Nahe), a tributary of the Nahe in Rhineland-Palatinate, Germany
- Ellerbach (Saale), a tributary of the Saale in Saxony-Anhalt, Germany
- Ellerbach, a part of Taiskirchen im Innkreis, Ried im Innkreis, Upper Austria, Austria

== People with the surname ==
- Burkhard von Ellerbach (1373-1404), politician in the Prince-Bishopric of Augsburg
- Herren von Ellerbach, enfeoffed in 1407 with a castle and town in Laupheim, Germany
- John Ellerbach and Bertold Ellerbach, brothers of the Szentgyörgyi family, appointed to Voivod of Transylvania in 1465 by King Matthias
- Ellerbach family, a family of 14th century Kőszeg, Hungary
- Werner von Ellerbach, first abbot of Wiblingen Abbey
- Anna von Ellerbach, second founder of Irsee Abbey at Irsee near Kaufbeuren in Bavaria
- Heinrich von Ellerbach, former provost of Buxheim Charterhouse
