= Bobenthaler Knopf =

534m high above sea level hill

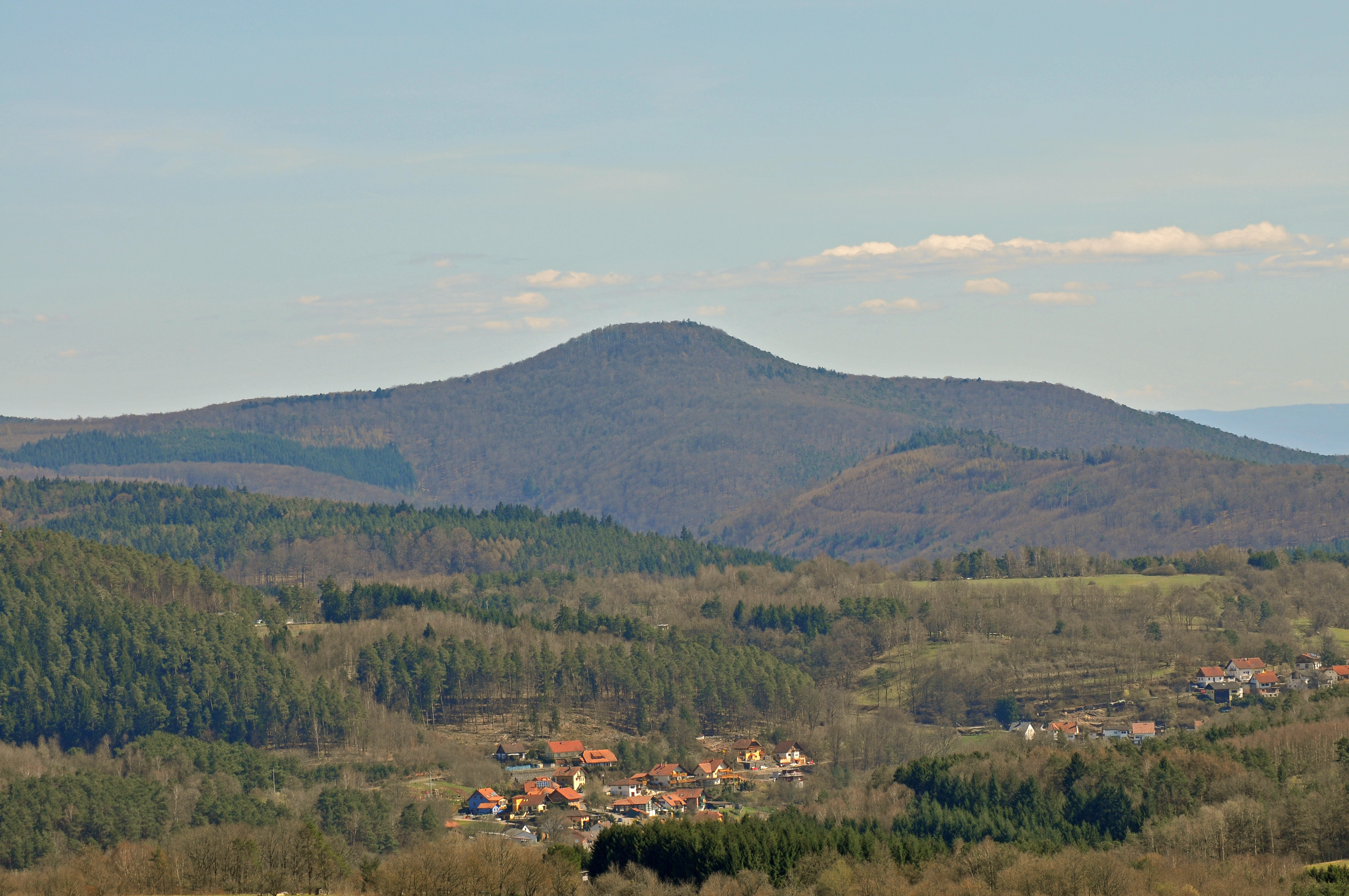
- View of the Bobenthaler Knopf from Napoleon Rock. Foreground: the municipality of Bundenthal; right rear: the northern Black Forest.

Highest point
- Elevation: 534 m above sea level (1,752 ft)
- Coordinates: 49°04′03″N 7°52′33″E

Geography
- Location within Rhineland-Palatinate
- Location: Rhineland-Palatinate, Germany
- Parent range: Palatine Forest

The Bobenthaler Knopf ("Bobenthal Knob") is a hill, 534 m above sea level (1,752 ft), in the southeastern Wasgau, the name given to the region covering the southern part of the Palatine Forest in Germany and the northern part of the Vosges in France.

The hill is located entirely within the territory of the municipality of Bobenthal, from which it derives its name. It lies about 2 kilometres (1.2 mi) east of the main settlement. In the west it descends relatively gently to the valley of the Wieslauter stream; in the east it drops considerably more steeply into the valley of the Reisbach. The Bobenthaler Kopf is covered by mixed woods. A footpath leads to the summit from the south. It forms the centre of the 319 hectares (790 acres) Bobenthaler Knopf Core Zone in the Palatine Forest Nature Park. About 1.5 kilometres (0.93 mi) to the south lie the Rittersteins of Löffelkreuz and Eselsschleifhäuschen.

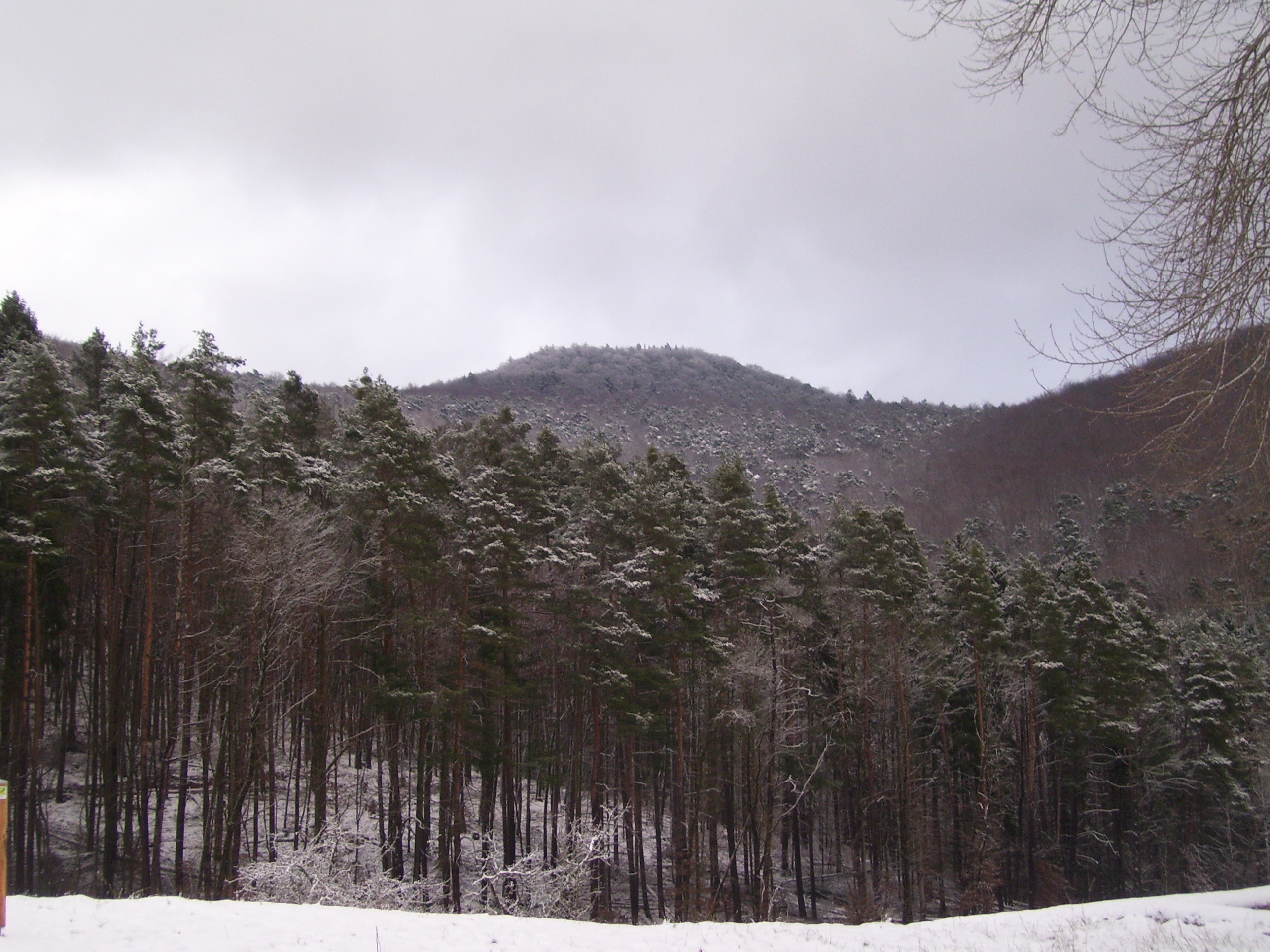
The Bobenthaler Knopf in winter
