= Langbach =

Langbach may refer to:

- Langbach (Kyll), river of Rhineland-Palatinate, Germany, tributary of the Kyll
- Langbach (Mauerner Bach), river of Bavaria, Germany, tributary of the Mauerner Bach
