= Schmittwasser =

River in Germany

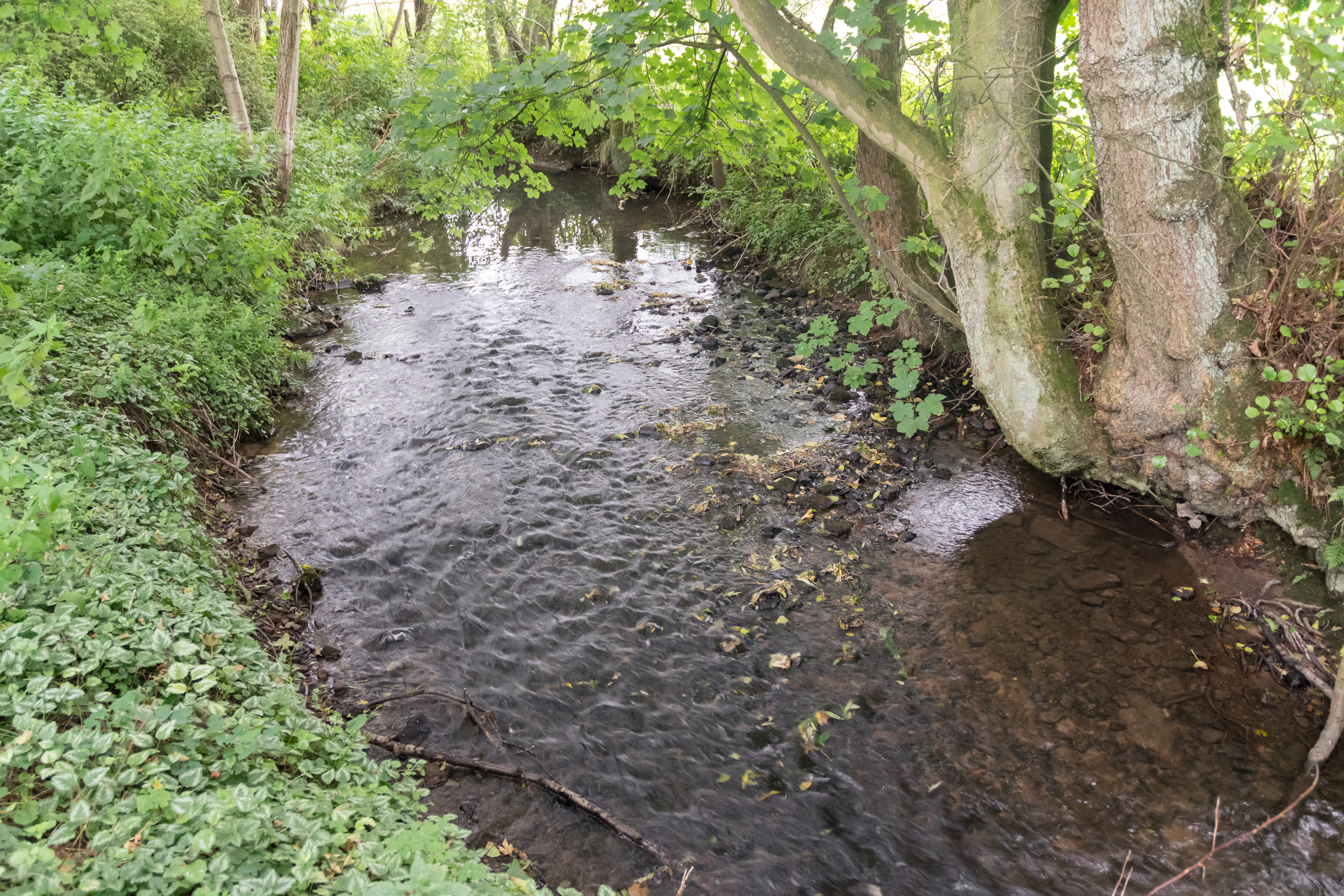

Location
- Country: Germany
- States: North Rhine-Westphalia

Physical characteristics
- Mouth
  - location: Sauer
  - coordinates: 51.6578°N 8.8898°E

Basin features
- Progression: Sauer→ Altenau→ Alme→ Lippe→ Rhine→ North Sea

Schmittwasser is a river of North Rhine-Westphalia, Germany. It is 8.8 km (5.5 mi) long and flows as a right tributary into the Sauer in Iggenhausen.

== See also ==
- List of rivers of North Rhine-Westphalia
