= Ringelbach =

Ringelbach may stand for:

- Ringelbach (Felchbach), a river of Bavaria, Germany, tributary of the Felchbach
- Ringelbach (Üßbach), a river of Rhineland-Palatinate, Germany, tributary of the Üßbach
