= Sauer (disambiguation) =

The Sauer is a tributary river to the Moselle, flowing through Belgium, Luxembourg and Germany.

Sauer may also refer to:

== Companies ==
- Sauer & Sohn (founded 1751), a German firearms manufacturer
- C. F. Sauer Company (founded 1887), a cooking products manufacturer
- SIG Sauer, US arm of Swiss manufacturing firm Swiss Arms AG

== Places and facilities ==
- Sauer (Altenau), a river of North Rhine-Westphalia, Germany
- Sauer (Rhine), a river in France and Germany
- Sauer Castle, an architecturally significant house in Kansas City, Kansas, US
- Paul Sauer Bridge, in South Africa

== Other uses ==
- Sauer (surname), any of several people
- Sauer Commission (created 1947), a South African study of segregation policies
- Cube 2: Sauerbraten, a 2004 online game
- Sauer Van, a Nazi gas van used in the Sajmište concentration camp

== See also ==
- Saur (disambiguation)
