= Gillenbach =

Gillenbach may refer to:

- Gillenbach (Queich), a river of Rhineland-Palatinate, Germany, tributary of the Queich
- Gillenbach (Schussen), a river of Baden-Württemberg, Germany, tributary of the Schussen
