= Lohrbach =

Lohrbach may refer to:

- Lohrbach (Aubach), a river of Bavaria, Germany
- Lohrbach (Kyll), a river of Rhineland-Palatinate, Germany
- Lohrbach (Lohr), a river of Hesse, Germany
