= Palmbach (disambiguation) =

Palmbach may refer to:

- Palmbach, a borough of Karlsruhe
- Palmbach (Aar), a river flowing into the Aar in Germany
