= List of rivers of Rhineland-Palatinate =

A list of rivers of Rhineland-Palatinate, Germany:

== A ==
- Aar
- Adenauer Bach
- Ahr
- Alf
- Alfbach
- Appelbach
- Asdorf
- Aubach

== B ==
- Birzenbach
- Blattbach
- Breitenbach
- Brexbach
- Brohlbach, tributary of the Moselle
- Brohlbach, tributary of the Rhine

== D ==
- Daade
- Dernbach

== E ==
- Eckbach
- Eisbach, tributary of the Queich
- Eisbach, tributary of the Rhine
- Elbbach
- Ellerbach, tributary of the Moselle
- Ellerbach, tributary of the Nahe
- Elzbach
- Engelsbach
- Enz
- Erlenbach, tributary of the Lauter
- Erlenbach, tributary of the Michelsbach
- Erlenbach, tributary of the Speyerbach
- Eußerbach

== F ==
- Feller Bach
- Floßbach
- Fockenbach

== G ==
- Glan
- Gillenbach
- Gosenbach
- Großbach, tributary of the Nahe
- Großbach, tributary of the Ruwer
- Gutenbach

== H ==
- Hainbach
- Heimersheimer Bach
- Heller
- Helmbach
- Hochspeyerbach
- Holperbach
- Holzbach
- Horn

== I ==
- Irserbach
- Isenach

== K ==
- Klingbach
- Königsbach
- Kyll

== L ==
- Lahn
- Lambsbach
- Langbach
- Langendernbach
- Lasterbach
- Laubach
- Lauter
- Lehbach
- Leukbach
- Lieser
- Little Kyll
- Lohrbach

== M ==
- Mandelbach
- Mehrbach
- Merzalbe
- Michelsbach
- Middle Rhine
- Modenbach
- Moosalb
- Moosbach
- Moselle
- Mußbach

== N ==
- Nahe
- Nette
- Nims
- Nister

== O ==
- Odenbach
- Otterbach
- Our

== P ==
- Palmbach
- Pfrimm
- Prims
- Prüm

== Q ==
- Queich

== R ==
- Rehbach
- Reisbach
- Rhine
- Ringelbach
- Riveris
- Rodalb
- Rodenbach
- Ruwer

== S ==
- Saar
- Salm
- Salzbach, tributary of the Elbbach
- Salzbach, tributary of the Lauter
- Sauer, tributary of the Moselle
- Sauer, tributary of the Rhine
- Sayn
- Schinderbach
- Schwarzbach
- Seltenbach
- Selz
- Sieg
- Speyerbach
- Spiegelbach
- Spießbach
- Swist

== T ==
- Tiefenbach

== U ==
- Upper Rhine
- Üßbach

== V ==
- Vinxtbach
- Völkerwiesenbach

== W ==
- Wadrill
- Weidas
- Wellbach
- Welzbach
- Wied
- Wiesbach
- Wisser Bach
- Wörsbach
