= Mosbrucher Weiher =

Coordinates: 50.260931°N 6.952013°E

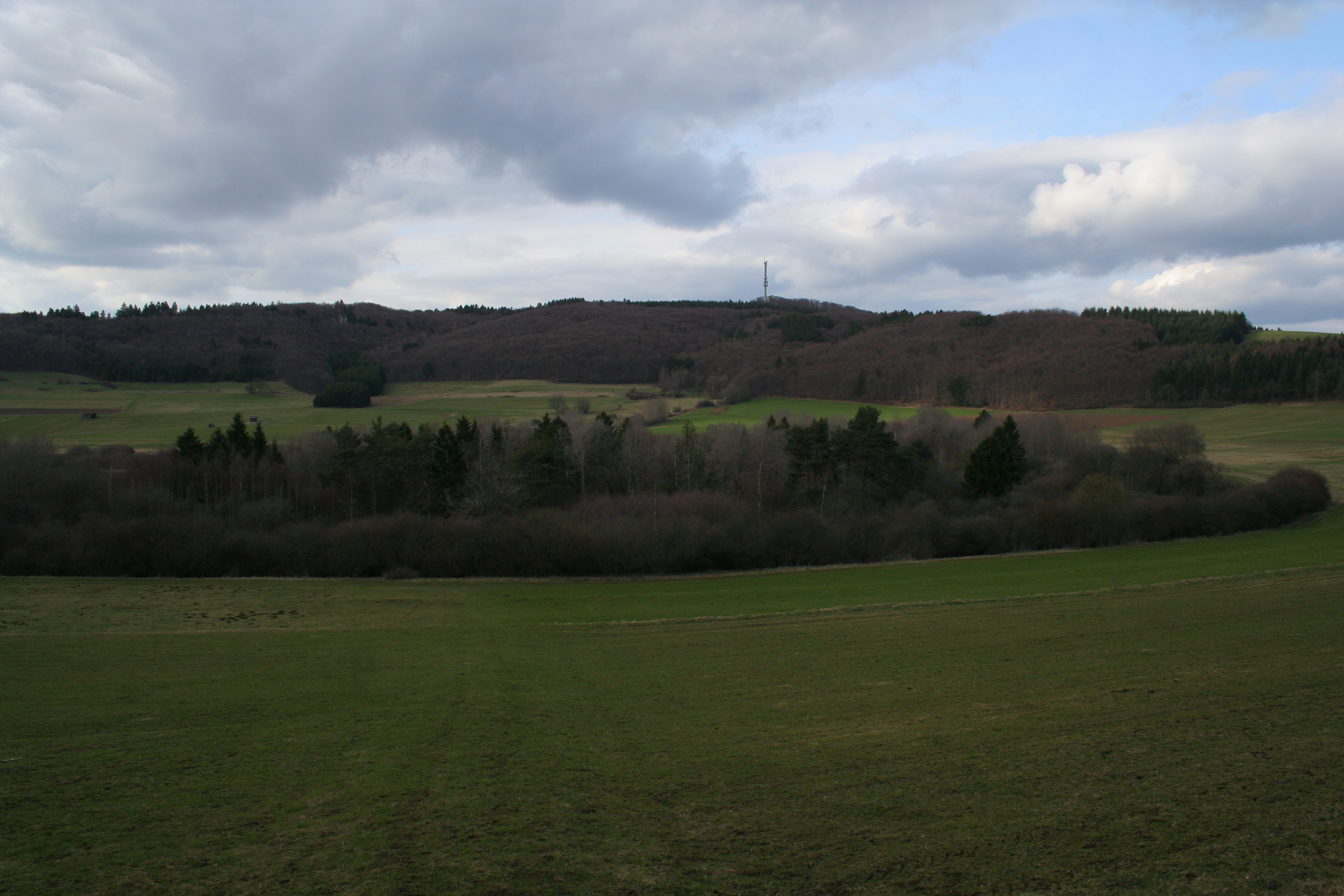
The Mosbrucher Weiher

The Mosbrucher Weiher, also called the Mosbrucher Maar, is a silted up maar east of the municipal boundary of the village of Mosbruch in the county Vulkaneifel in Germany. It is located immediately at the foot of the 675-metre-high Hochkelberg, a former volcano. The floor of the maar is in the shape of an elongated oval and is about 700×500 metres in size, its upper boundary has a diameter of about 1,300 × 1,050 metres. This makes the Mosbrucher Maar the third largest of the maars in the western Eifel region. The Üßbach stream flows past and close to the Mosbrucher Weiher.

== Origin ==
According to pollen analysis studies, the crater was formed about 11,000 years ago by a volcanic eruption. In the area around the maar there are very few volcanic tuffs in comparison to other Eifel maars; only in two places are there greater accumulations of tuff; the rest of the surrounding area is covered only by a thin layer. Either most of the tuffs have already been removed, or the eruption produced very little tuff.

After volcanic activity ceased, water collected in the maar basin and a very shallow maar lake was formed. Because of its low water level it silted up relatively quickly and, after a few thousand years, became bog.

As early as Roman times - there are still remains of Roman facilities on the Hochkelberg - the remaining water was impounded to create a fish pond. In 1838, water was drained from the pond so that the western outlying areas could be used as arable land. Today, it forms meadowland and pastureland, while the eastern part retains its bog character.

In the 20th century, the 6-metre-thick peat layer of the lake was harvested in order to produce peat for heating. Peat cutting ceased in the 1950s.

== Nature reserve ==
The bog has created an excellent habitat for rare plants and animals. In 1980, the Mosbrucher Weiher was declared a nature reserve. It was the 100th nature reserve in the state of Rhineland-Palatinate. The long-term renaturalisation measure is embedded in the overall project "Restoration and conservation of hillside bogs, raised bogs and intermediate bogs and their adjacent habitats in the Hunsrück and the Eifel", with the Stiftung Natur und Umwelt Rheinland-Pfalz as the project sponsor. Visitors to the maar are guided by carefully laid-out gangplanks in order to protect the maar from damage.

== Literature ==
- Wilhelm Meyer (1986), Geologie der Eifel (in German) (1st ed.), Stuttgart: Schweizerbart'sche Verlagsbuchhandlung, p. 363, ISBN 3-510-65127-8
