= Ringelbach (Üßbach) =

River in Germany

Location
- Country: Germany
- State: Rhineland-Palatinate

Physical characteristics
- Mouth
  - location: Üßbach
  - coordinates: 50.2576°N 6.9377°E

Basin features
- Progression: Üßbach→ Alf→ Moselle→ Rhine→ North Sea

Ringelbach is a small river of Rhineland-Palatinate, Germany. It is a right tributary of the Üßbach near Mosbruch.

== See also ==
- List of rivers of Rhineland-Palatinate
