= Mandelbach =

Mandelbach may refer to:

- Mandelbach (Blies), a river of Saarland, Germany, tributary of the Blies
- Mandelbach (Prüm), a river of Rhineland-Palatinate, Germany, tributary of the Prüm
