= Ruwer =

River in Germany

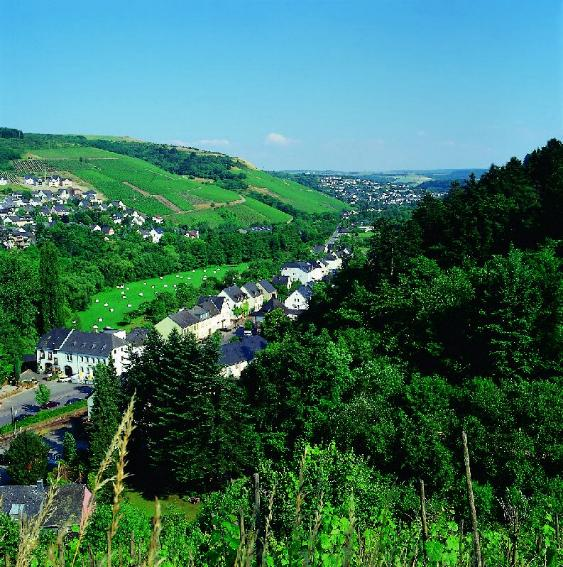
- Ruwer valley near Kasel

Location
- Country: Germany
- State: Rhineland-Palatinate

Physical characteristics
- Source
  - location: Hunsrück
- Mouth
  - location: Moselle
  - coordinates: 49.7855°N 6.7052°E
- Length: 46 km (29 mi)
- Basin size: 238 km^{2} (92 sq mi)

Basin features
- Progression: Moselle→ Rhine→ North Sea

The Ruwer is a river in Germany with a length of 46 kilometres (29 mi). It is a right tributary of the Moselle. The valley of the Ruwer is a part of the Moselle wine-growing region near Trier in the state of Rhineland-Palatinate. It is famous for its Riesling wines, see Ruwer (region), and, prior to 1 August 2007, the Moselle region used to be known as Moselle-Saar-Ruwer.

In the lower Ruwer valley are the villages of Waldrach, Kasel, Mertesdorf, Eitelsbach and Ruwer.

== History ==
The Roman city of Trier (Augusta Treverorum) was supplied with water by the Roman Ruwer Aqueduct, which delivered up to 25,000 cubic metres per day.

In A.D. 371, the Ruwer was mentioned by the Roman poet, Ausonius, in his poem, Mosella as follows: "The Ruwer turns the corn-grinding millstones in giddy whirls and draws the shrieking saws through smooth marble blocks."

== Tributaries ==
Stream index number (FGKZ)	Name	Length (km)	Catchment area (km²)
265600000	Ruwer	48.72	237.300
265694000	Parkbach (Avel)	2.40	3.593
265692000	Benninger Bach	2.65	1.931
265678000	Korlingerbach	0.84	0.711
265676000	Waldbach	2.41	2.563
265671200	Geizenburger Waschbach	1.51	1.810
265659200	Alkenbach	1,03	0,889
265654000	Klinkbach	5.37	10.627
265654400	Reiperterbach	2.15	1.708
265654200	Ronnerwiesbach	1.35	1.697
265640000	Großbach	7.67	27.769
265642000	Eselsbach	6.69	8.628
265644000	Ellerborn (Kittelbach)	1.54	1.533
265636000	Waldbach (Weiherbach)	4.22	5.513
265636200	Bach am Willemskopf	0.96	1.214
265634000	Burkelsbach	5.28	18.867
265634200	Aalbach	1.44	3.285
265634420	Siebenborn	2.43	3.801
265634422	Sternhausbach	1.22	1.434
265634400	Winkelbach (Pehlbach)	1.59	8.893
265634440	Hinzerter Bach	2.21	3.771
265614000	Kahlbach (Mühlscheider Bach)	2.09	8.027
265614200	Rothbach	2.73	3.923
265612000	Gimpelswiesenbach	1.87	2.476
265620000	Lehbach (Spalbach)	6.60	12.794
265622000	Ellersbach (Kreidbach)	3.21	2.374
265624000	Marscheiderbach (Gondersbach)	2.57	4.175
265624220	Bach vom Kellergebrüche	0.66	0.389
265624200	Bach vom Lindenhof	0.86	0.808
265632000	Flonterbach	2.67	3.173
265656000	Burg Heid-Bach	2.07	2.938
265656200	Bach am Heidkopf	0.97	1.041
265662000	Neukreutzbach	2.85	2.365
265660000	Rauruwer	6.13	10.042
265672200	Kieweringsbach	1.14	1.005
265672000	Entergraben und Grindelbach	6.52	10.043
265673200	Rotegraben	2.71	3.987
265674200	Scheisingsgraben	1.02	0.824
265674000	Starkelsgraben	1.92	1.620
265686000	Kallerbach	1.19	0.889
265683200	Edriesbach	1.18	1.881
265682000	Altweiherbach	1.78	2.532
265680000	Riveris und Eschbach	13.28	28.866
265684000	Misselbach	3.23	3.693
265687200	Thielenbach	2.91	3.720
265688000	Bausbach	3.76	7.455

Other tributaries of the Ruwer include the Apfelbach, Borgraben, Eitelsbach, Gusterather Waschbach, Kundelbach, Labach, Moertschelbach, Rimperterbach, Wenigbach, Wenzelbach and the Wilzenburger Waschbach.

== Mills ==
There are, or were, several water mills in the Ruwer region: Alte Mühle Kell am See, Mühlscheider Hof in Kahlbach, Schillingen Mill Lehbach, Niederkell Mill, Unterste Mühle at Burkelsbach, Saw mill at Burkelsbach, Waldweiler Mill, Niederzerfer Mill on the Ruwer, Hauser Mill on the Ruwer, Mill at Großbach in Zerf, Kramesmühle Hentern, Hentern Mill, Lampaden Mill at Reiperter Bach, Benrath Mill at Klinkbach, Burg Heid Mill, Hinzenburg Mill, Heddert Mill on the Rauruwer, Little Geizenburg Mill, Pluwiger Hammer, Mill at Enterbach, Raulsmühle near Lonzenburg, Mill in Sommerau and another mill, Korlingen Mill, Herrgottsmühle (Morscheid Mill), Studentenmühle, Lichtenthalsmühle, Schleifmühle at the Riveris mouth in Waldrach, Schmelzmühle Waldrach, Schneidemühle Riveris, Feilensmühle Riveris, Osburger Mühle on the Riveris, Alte Dorfmühle Waldrach (Scherfsmühle), Ölmühle, Welschmühle Waldrach, Mills in Kasel, Karlsmühle Mertesdorf, Reisenmühle, Grünhäuser Mill, Hüstermühle Trier-Ruwer, Lambertysmühle, Felsenmühle, etc.

== Biology ==
In and by the Ruwer live numerous rare and protected species, such as the bullhead, dipperl, purple emperor butterfly and the kingfisher. Until the 1940s, salmons were still caught in the Ruwer.

== See also ==
- List of rivers of Rhineland-Palatinate
