= Gutenbach =

Gutenbach may refer to:

- Gütenbach, a municipality in Baden-Württemberg, Germany
- Gutenbach (Appelbach), a river of Rhineland-Palatinate, Germany, tributary of the Appelbach
- Gutenbach (Sulzach), a river of Bavaria, Germany, tributary of the Sulzach
- Gutenbach (Wildenbach), a river of North Rhine-Westphalia, Germany, tributary of the Wildenbach
