= Schelderbach =

River in Germany

Location
- Country: Germany
- States: North Rhine-Westphalia

Physical characteristics
- Mouth
  - location: Gosenbach
  - coordinates: 50.8549°N 7.9636°E

Basin features
- Progression: Gosenbach→ Sieg→ Rhine→ North Sea

Schelderbach is a small river of North Rhine-Westphalia, Germany. It is 3.1 km (1.9 mi) long and flows as a right tributary into the Gosenbach near Siegen.

== See also ==
- List of rivers of North Rhine-Westphalia
