= Schinderbach =

River of Germany

Location
- Country: Germany
- States: Rhineland-Palatinate; North Rhine-Westphalia

Physical characteristics
- Mouth
  - location: Gosenbach
  - coordinates: 50.8484°N 7.9590°E

Basin features
- Progression: Gosenbach→ Sieg→ Rhine→ North Sea

Schinderbach is a small river of Rhineland-Palatinate and North Rhine-Westphalia, Germany. It is 3.7 km (2.3 mi) long and flows as a right tributary into the Gosenbach near Siegen.

== See also ==
- List of rivers of Rhineland-Palatinate
- List of rivers of North Rhine-Westphalia
