= Isenach =

Left tributary of the Rhine

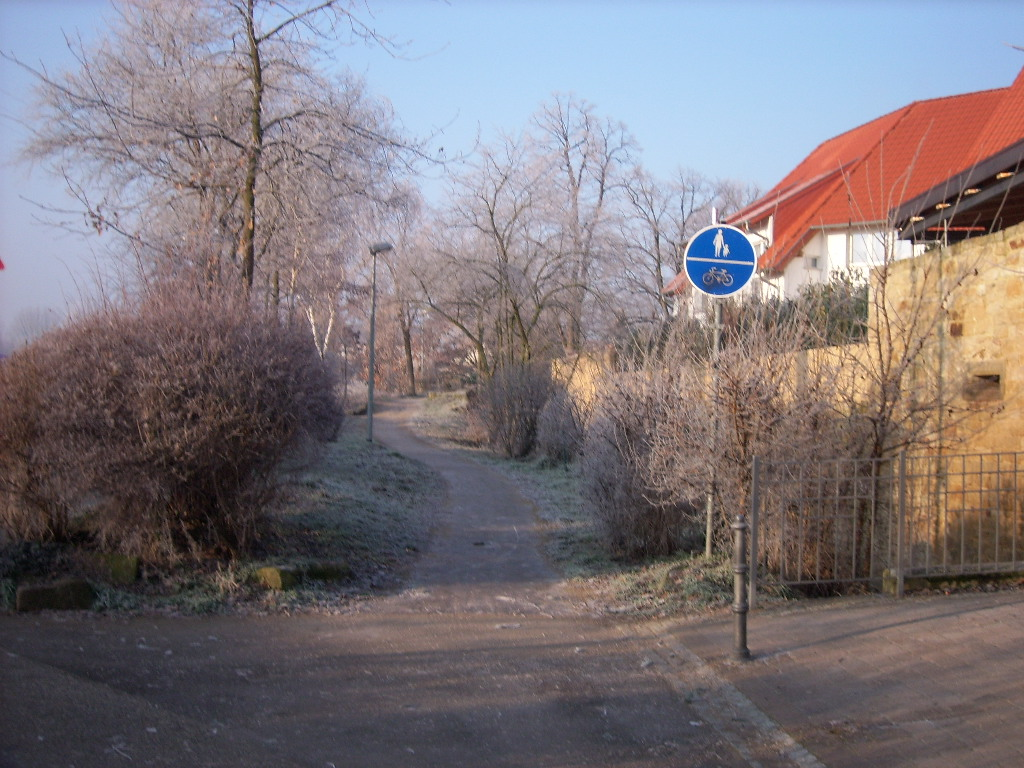
- Isenach bank in Erpolzheim

Location
- Country: Germany
- State: Rhineland-Palatinate
- Region: Palatinate Forest

Physical characteristics
- Source
  - location: Diemerstein Forest
  - coordinates: 49°28′29″N 7°59′51″E
  - elevation: 325 m (1,066 ft)
- Mouth
  - location: Confluence with the Rhine at Bobenheim-Roxheim
  - coordinates: 49°35′40″N 8°24′46″E
- Length: 35.84 km (22.27 mi)
- Basin size: 294.924 km^{2} (113.871 sq mi)

Basin features
- Progression: Rhine→ North Sea
- Tributaries
  - left: Fuchsbach
  - right: Floßbach

The Isenach is a left tributary of the Rhine in the northeastern Palatine region of Rhineland-Palatinate. It is nearly 36 kilometres (22 mi) long.

== Course ==
The Isenach rises in the northern Palatinate Forest, 2 kilometres (1.2 mi) southwest of Carlsberg Hertlingshausen. Its source in the Diemerstein Forest on the southeast flank of a saddle between the peaks Krummes Eck, elevation 449 metres (1,473 ft), and Hohe Bühl, elevation 444 metres (1,457 ft), is marked with Ritterstein number 277, with the inscription "Isenach source". The first 5 kilometres (3 mi) of the river flow in a southeasterly direction. After the Isenach passes the Isenachweiher reservoir, it flows east through a valley it shares with Bundesstraße 37, Kaiserslautern-Bad Dürkheim.

In Bad Dürkheim, the Isenach breaks through the Haardt, the eastern edge of the Palatinate Forest, and enters the hills flanking the German Wine Road. It the flows northeast through the Upper Rhine Plain. Between Lambsheim and the Frankenthal district of Eppstein, the Isenach is joined by the Floßbach from the right.

In the city of Frankenthal, the Isenach turns northwards. It is then joined by the Fuchsbach from the left. It then flows through the suburb of Mörsch, where the Isenach is known as the Mörschbach, before passing through the southeast of Bobenheim-Roxheim into a loop of the Roxheimer Altrhein (Old Rhine) known as the Silbersee (Roxheim), and finally discharges into the Upper Rhine 4 kilometres (2.5 mi) south of Worms.

== History ==
=== Isenachweiher ===
A dam was constructed in the Isenach in 1736–37 at about 5 kilometres (3 mi) from the source, forming a reservoir named the Isenachweiher. The aim was to ensure an even flow of the river. This was necessary because until 1850 the pumps of the Bad Dürkheim Salt Works (also built in 1736) were operated using the Isenach as a source of water power. The dam also ensured the water supply of a water wheel below the dam. The dam was renovated and restored in the mid-1980s.

=== Raising the river ===
In the mid-18th century a mill was constructed as Lambsheim, the Lambsheimer Mühle. In order to provide this mill with a stronger gradient, the stream bed above the mill with raised by 2 metres (6.6 ft) over a length of about 1,400 metres (4,600 ft), and some of the river's water was diverted into a new mill channel. However, the combination of this situation and a later straightening of the Isenach further upstream, caused floods in Lambsheim whenever it rained heavily. In 2008, after more than 250 years, the raising of the riverbed was reverted and the stream was restored to its old riverbed. The dirt excavated from the old riverbed contained naturally occurring arsenic and had to be treated as chemical waste. The mill channel was considered industrial heritage and was preserved. Water is continuously pumped into the channel to prevent it from falling dry. The total cost of the restoration project was 780000euros; the state of Rhineland-Palatinate contributed over 500000euros.

=== Diversion ===
Until the 1780s, the Isenach flowed from the southern edge of Frankenthal to the east. However, when the city of Frankenthal had dug its Kanalhafen ("Canal Harbour"), the Isenach and the Fuchsbach were diverted to fill it. For more than a century and a half, the Isenach flowed via the Frankenthal Canal into the Rhine. It 1944, however, the canal had to be closed due to severe bomb damage. The Isenach was diverted further north, to its current mouth, which is about 8 kilometres (5 mi) from its original confluence with the Rhine.

=== Swimming pool ===
The first public swimming facility in the town of Frankenthal was a pond-like widening of the Isenach, just outside the southern edge of the city, near the Post Bridge. It was operated until the Frankenthal lido was opened in the east of the city in 1934.

== Gallery ==
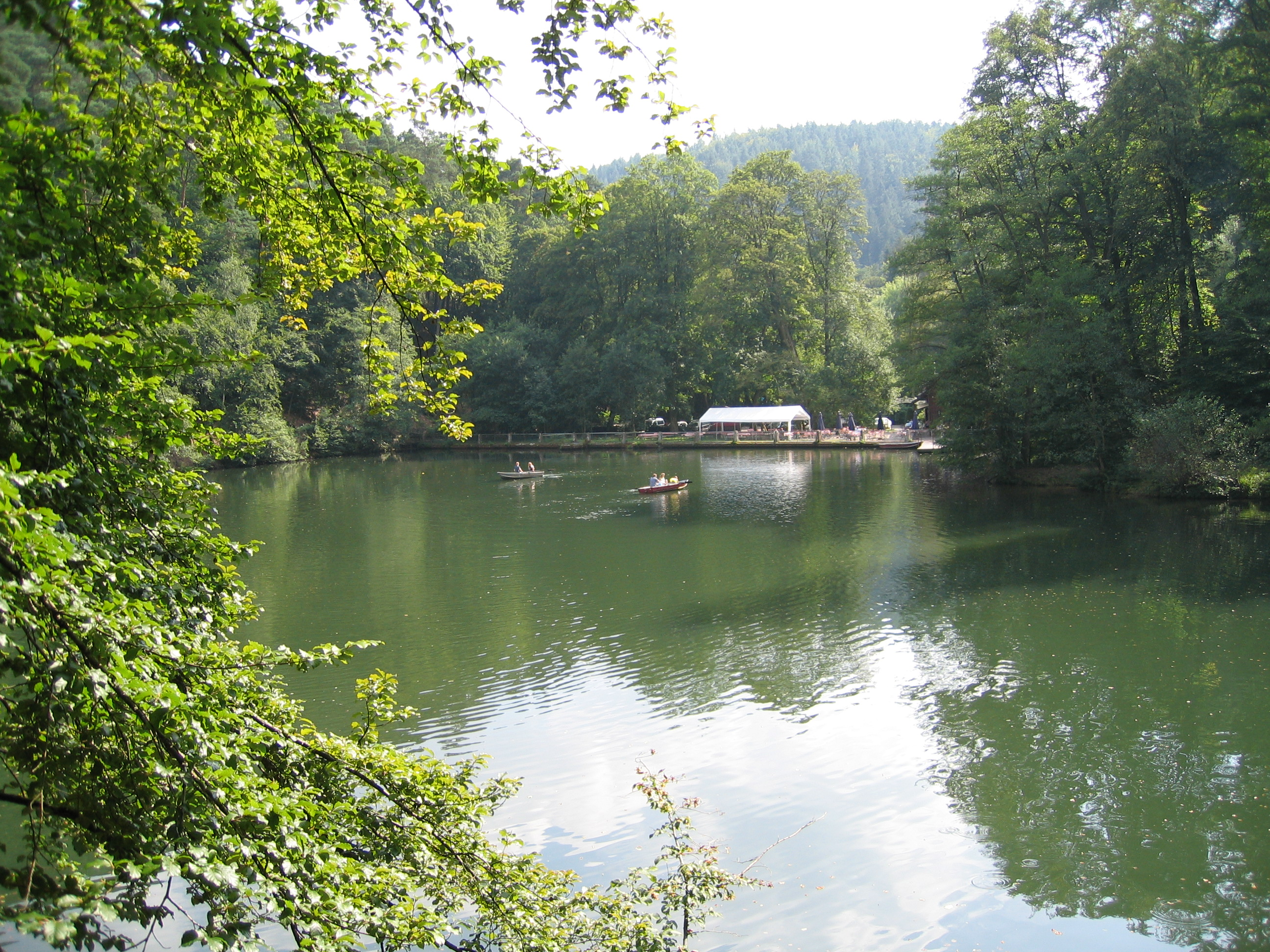
Isenachweiher reservoir

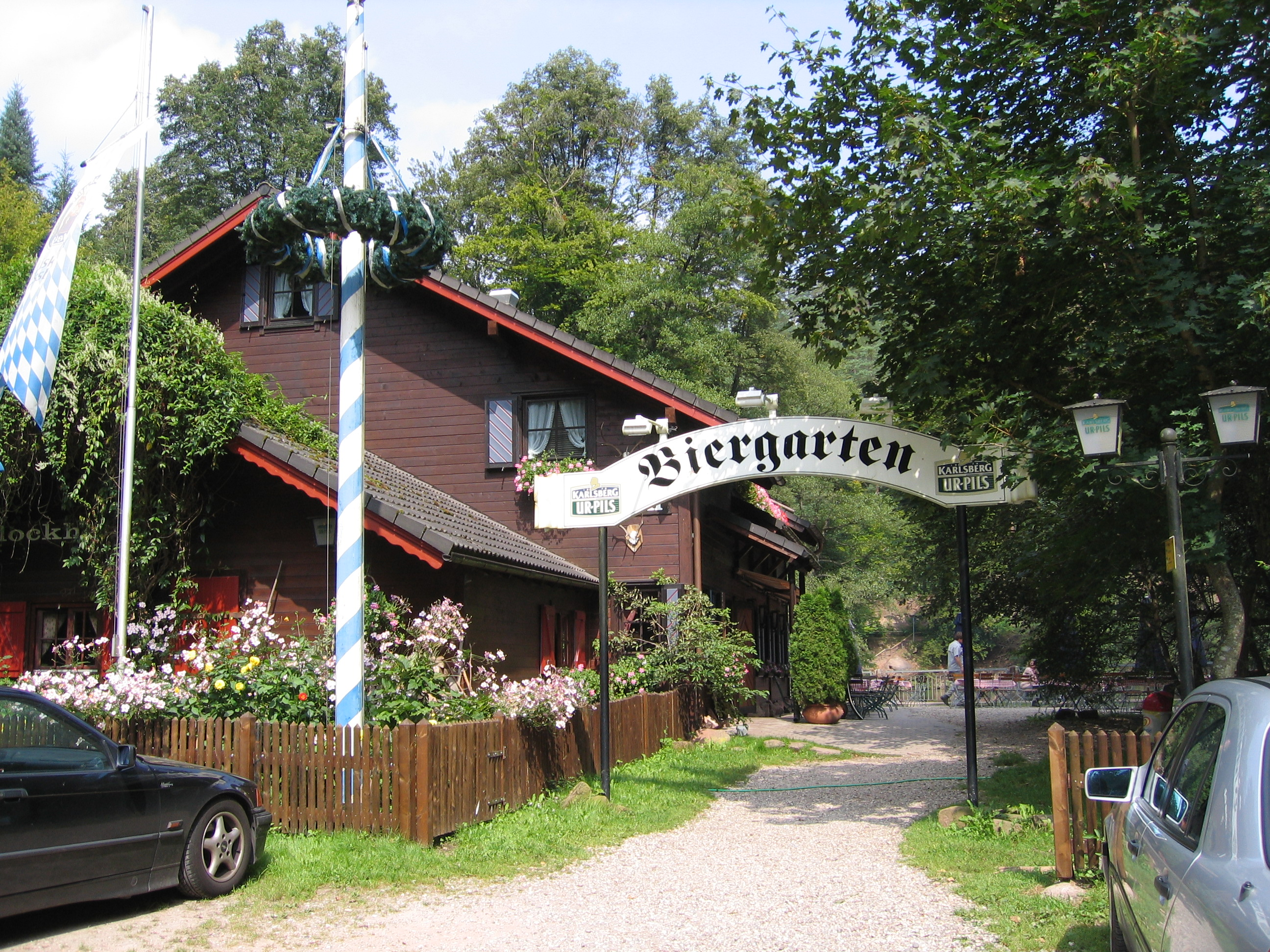
Forest guest house on the Isenach

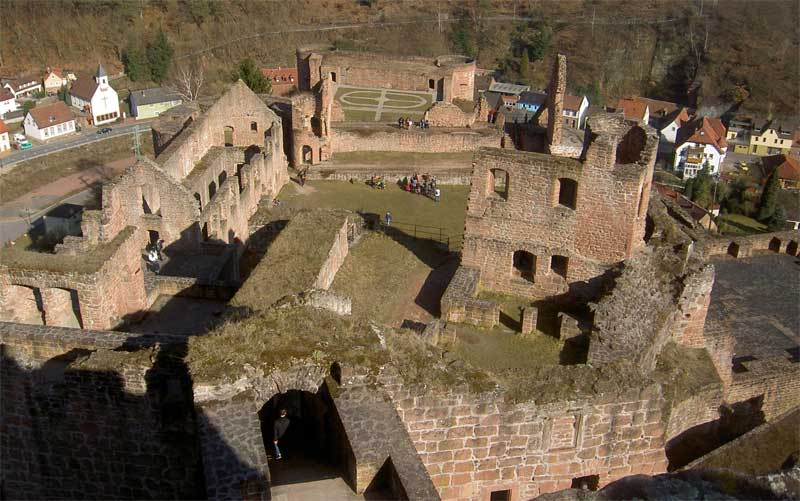
Ruins of the castle Hardenburg

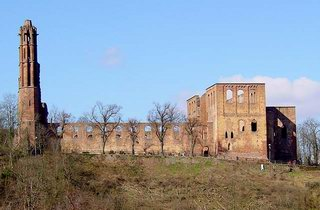
Ruins of Limburg Abbey

== Sights ==
Isenachweiher – At the spot where once the house of the keeper stood, who had to supervise the reservoir, there is now a spacious forest guest house, built as a log cabin. Row boats can be rented here.

Iron Mill – The guest house Alte Schmelz, 3 kilometres (2 mi) below the Isenachweiher dam still contains part of the Iron Mill, which was driven by water from the Isenach.

Castle and Abbey – Just before the Isenach breaks through the eastern edge of the Palatinate Forest, the ruins of two medieval buildings can be seen above Dürkheim valley: the castle Hardenburg and Limburg Abbey. The castle was owned by the noble Leiningen family; the abbey was founded by Emperor Conrad II.

Graduation tower – The graduation tower Bad Dürkheim produced medicinal salts, until it was destroyed by arson attacks in 1992 and 2007. Rebuilding the plant is expected to begin in 2009.

Frankenthal Canal – The Frankenthal Canal used to be the lower 4 kilometres (2.5 mi) of the Isenach. After the canal was abandoned, most of it was filled in 22 years later in 1966, except for the old lock, which was expanded to a retention basin in the second half of the 20th century.

=== Celtic and Roman finds ===
On the left of the Dürkheim valley, there are several ancient sights:

- the Heidenmauer, a Celtic hill fort from about 500 BCE
- the Kriemhildenstuhl, a quarry dating back to Roman times
- the Teufelsstein, a monolith which was used in religious rites during the Celtic period.
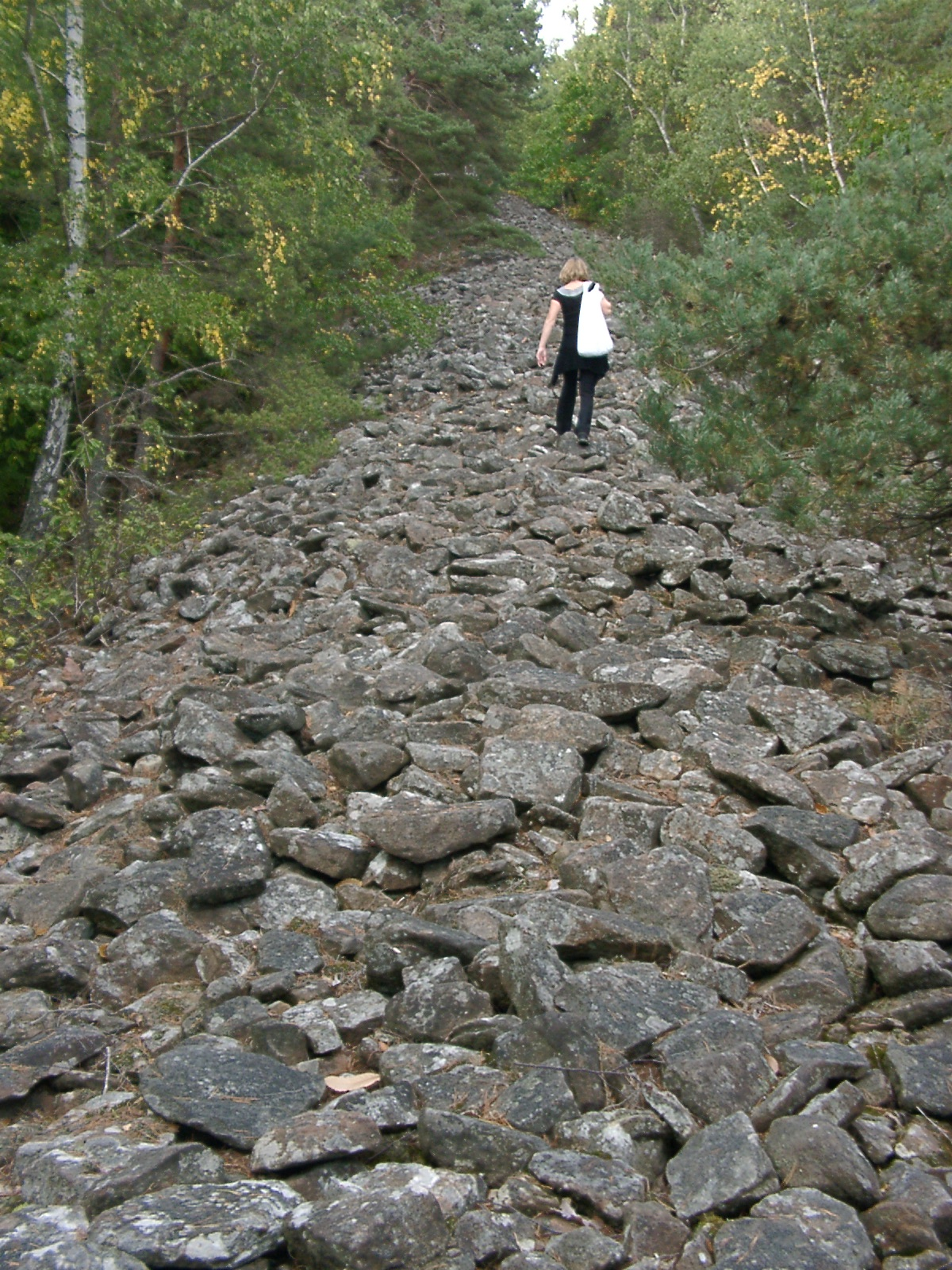
Celtic ring wall Heidenmauer

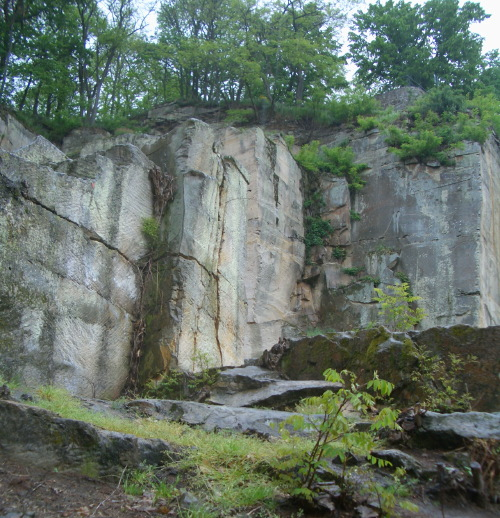
Roman quarry Kriemhildenstuhl

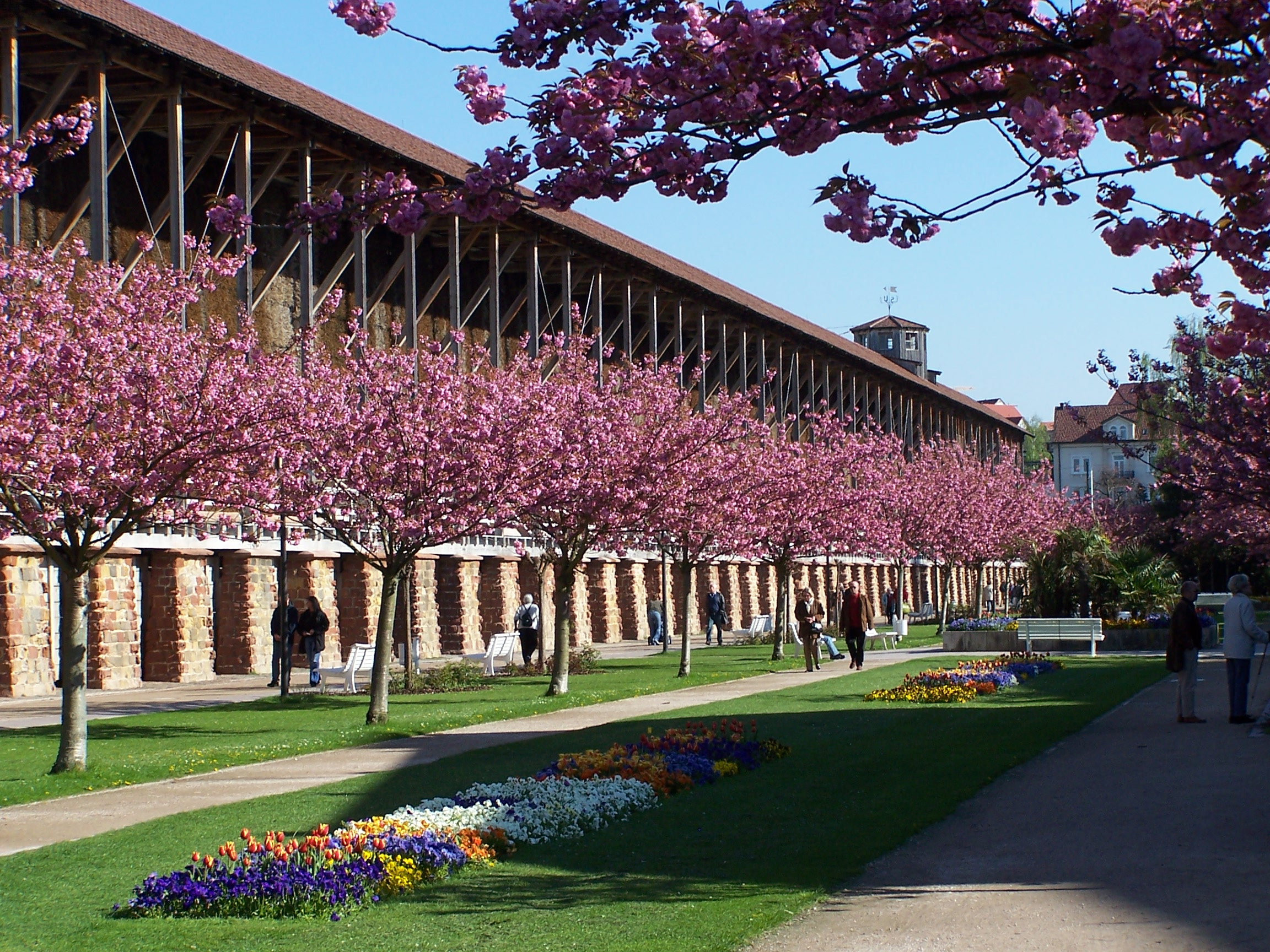
Graduation tower Bad Dürkheim

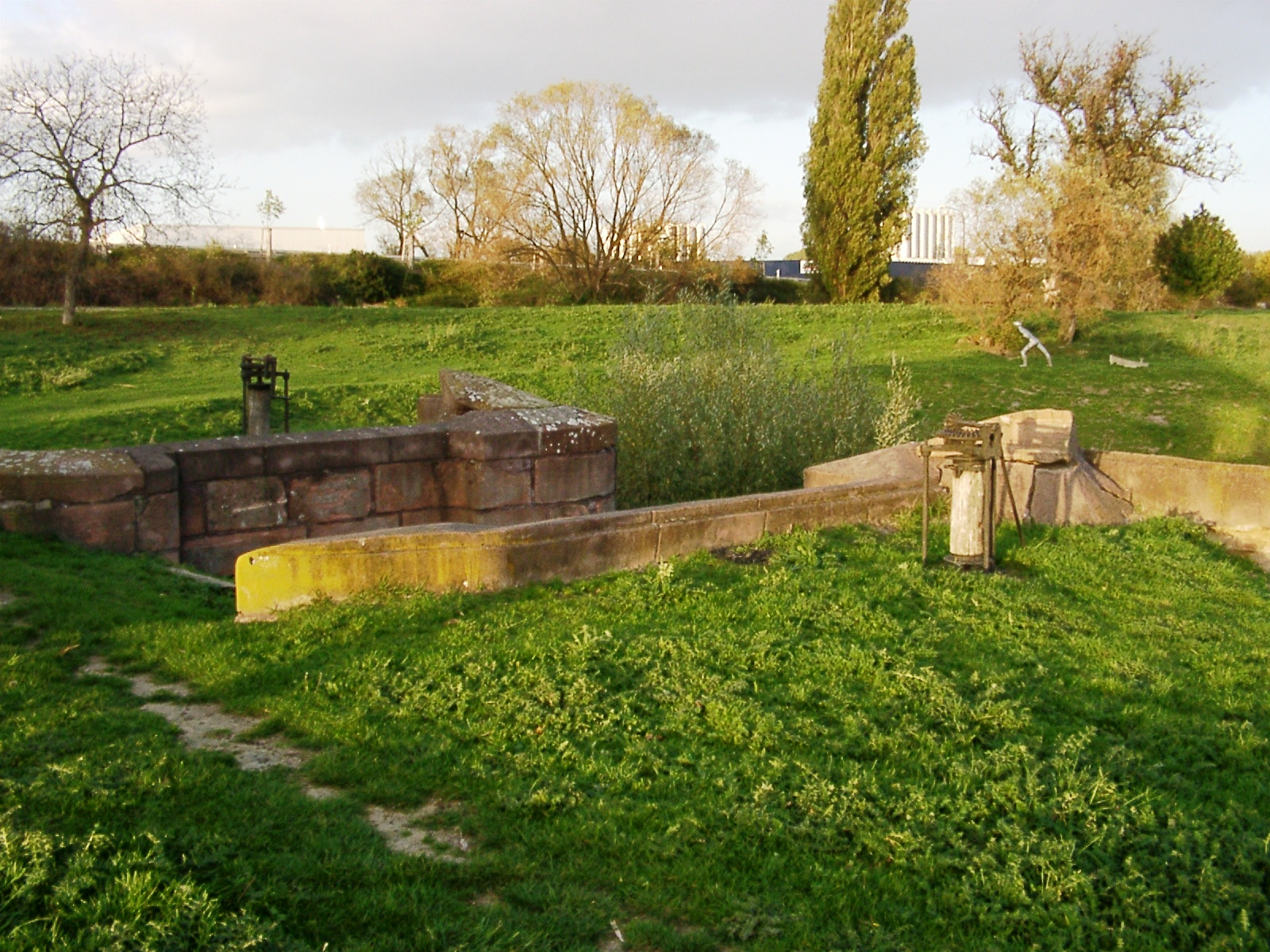
Former lock of Frankenthal Canal

== Economy ==
The Isenach is still important as a source of water for the paper manufacturing industry in the Dürkheim valley. For a long time, sewage water was fed back into the stream untreated. This cause the water of the river to be coloured brown, giving it the nickname "Cola Brook". Today, sewage is properly treated before being allowed back into the river. Some of the damage done to the environment in the past, however, has not been put right, yet. The Struktur- und Genehmigungsdirektion Süd ("Structure and Planning Directorate South") in Neustadt an der Weinstrasse has started a "Pilot Project Isenach", which aims at restoring the natural state of the Isenach. On a municipal level, the Isenbach is a responsibility of the Gewässer-Zweckverband Isenach-Eckbach ("Water District Isenach Eckbach"), which is subordinate to the Landkreis Bad Dürkheim.

== See also ==
- List of rivers of Rhineland-Palatinate
