= Ellerbach (Altenau) =

River in Germany

Coordinates: 51°39′36″N 8°43′27″E

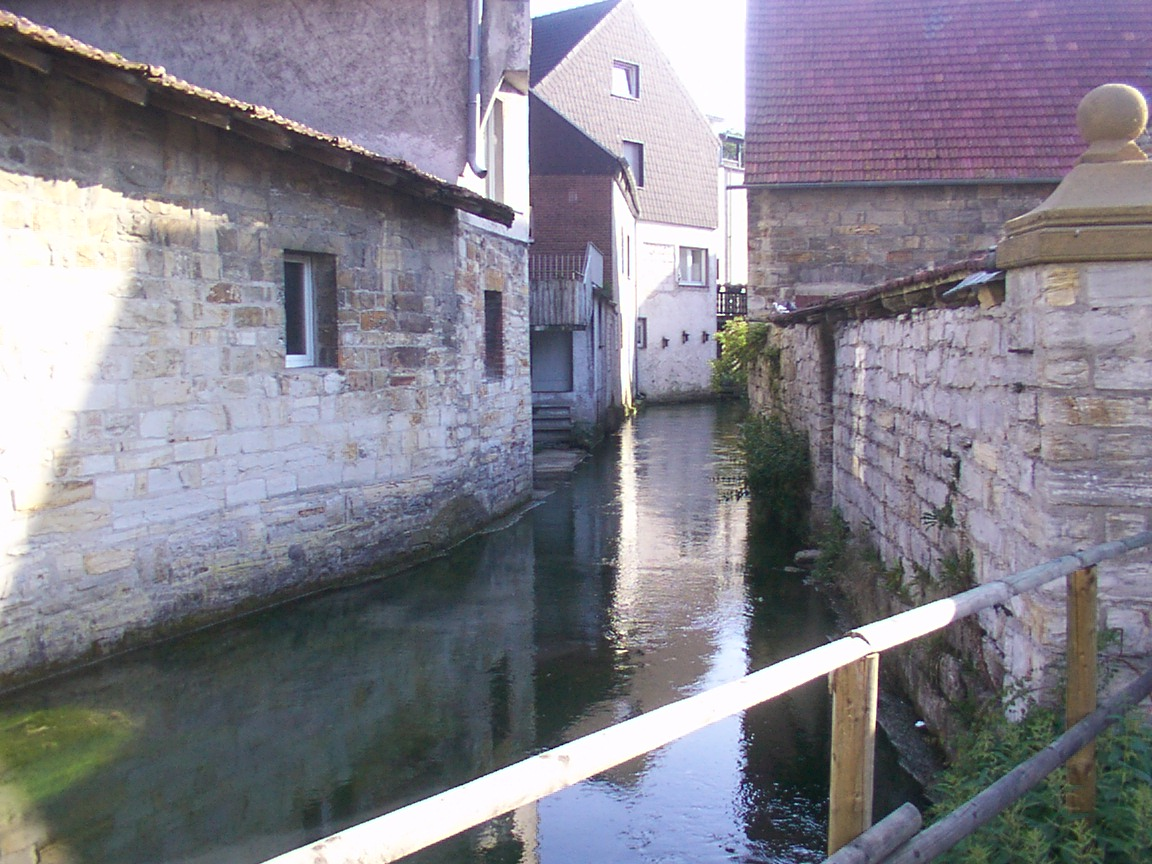

Location
- Country: Germany
- State: North Rhine-Westphalia

Physical characteristics
- Mouth
  - location: Altenau
- Length: 28.5 km (17.7 mi)

Basin features
- Progression: Altenau→ Alme→ Lippe→ Rhine→ North Sea

Ellerbach is a river of North Rhine-Westphalia, Germany. It flows into the Altenau in Borchen.

== See also ==
- List of rivers of North Rhine-Westphalia
