= Wisser Bach =

River in Germany

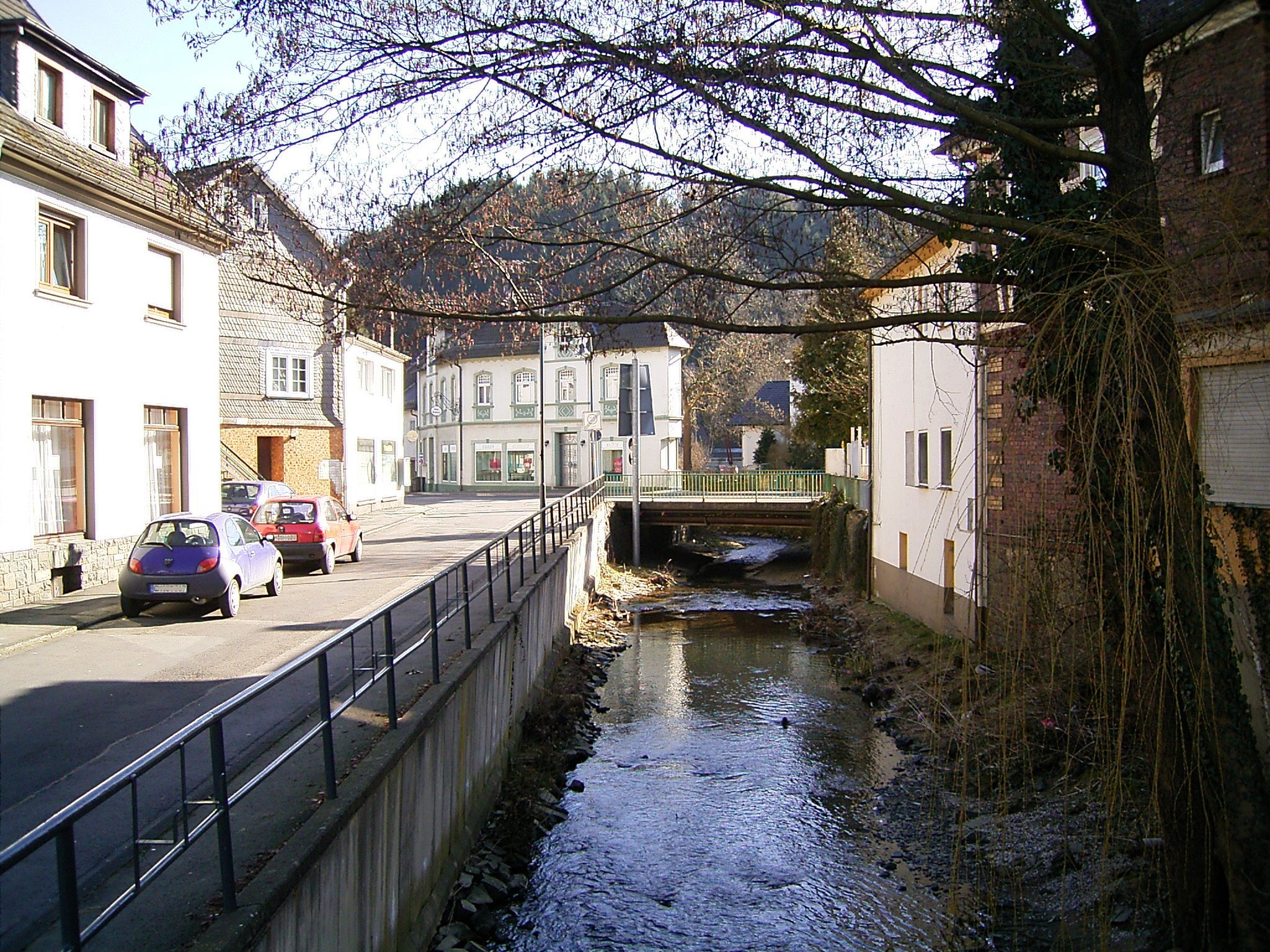
- The Wisser Bach in Morsbach

Location
- Country: Germany
- States: North Rhine-Westphalia; Rhineland-Palatinate

Physical characteristics
- Mouth
  - location: Sieg
  - coordinates: 50.7845°N 7.7317°E
- Length: 25.8 km (16.0 mi)

Basin features
- Progression: Sieg→ Rhine→ North Sea

Wisser Bach is a river of North Rhine-Westphalia and Rhineland-Palatinate, Germany. It flows into the Sieg in Wissen.

== See also ==
- List of rivers of North Rhine-Westphalia
- List of rivers of Rhineland-Palatinate
