= Isenachweiher =

Reservoir in Germany

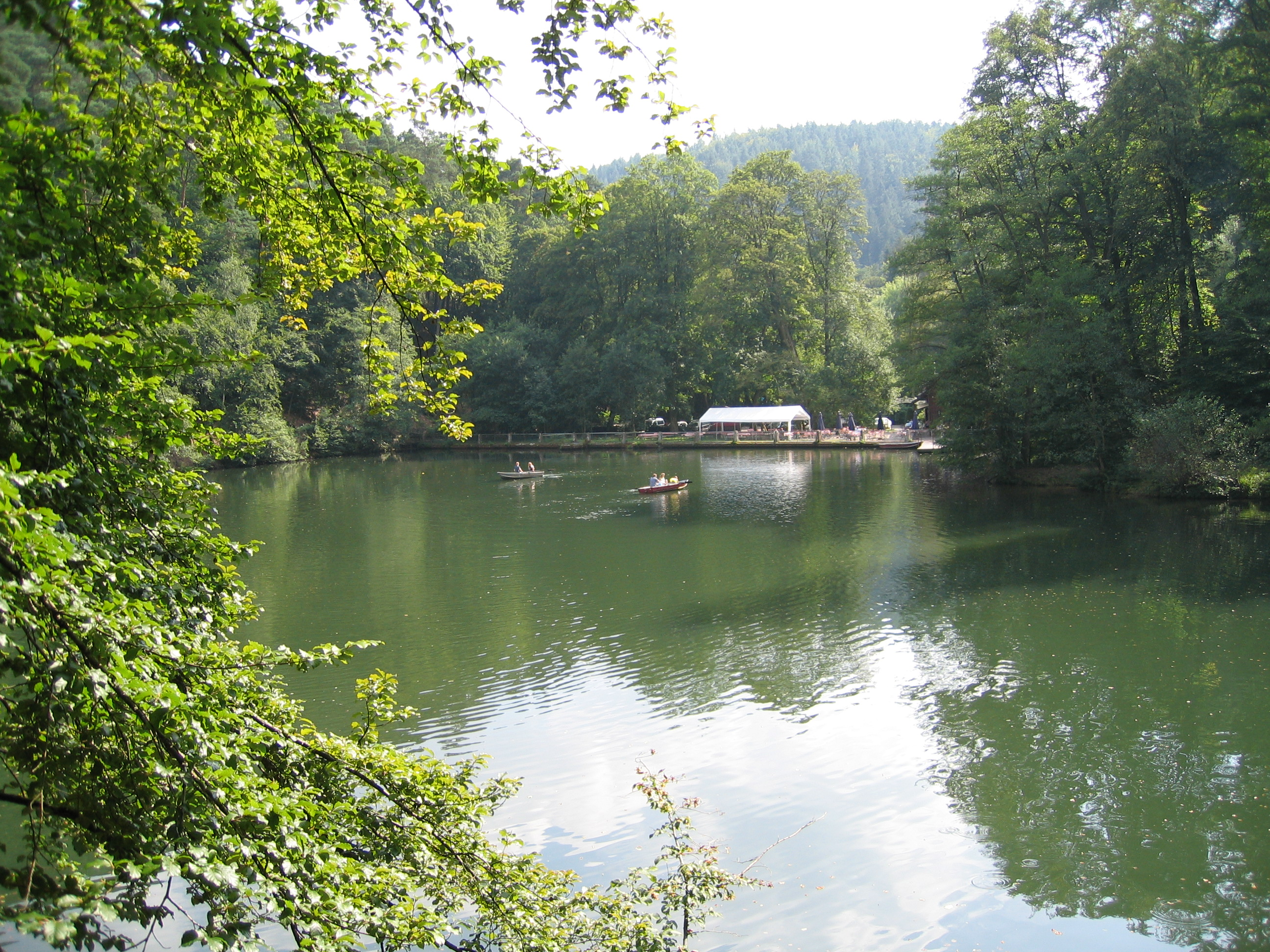

- Location within Rhineland-Palatinate
- Location: Palatinate Forest (Rhineland-Palatinate)
- Coordinates: 49°27′23″N 8°02′10″E
- Primary inflows: Isenach
- Primary outflows: Isenach
- Basin countries: Germany
- Surface area: 1.785 ha (4.41 acres)
- Max. depth: 8 m (26 ft)

The Isenachweiher in the Palatinate Forest (Rhineland-Palatinate) is a reservoir on the River Isenach, a left tributary of the Rhine. Such reservoirs are called woogs in this region.

== Geography ==
=== Location ===
The Isenachweiher lies in the northeastern Palatinate Forest, 200 metres north of the B 37 federal highway, which runs from the county town of Bad Dürkheim to Frankenstein. It is part of the forest estated of Bad Dürkheim, whose built up area is about 10 kilometres away.

=== Extent ===
The whole Isenachweiher has an area of 17,850 m², roughly twice the size of a football field. What is perceived by visitors as the actual lake surface, lies above the dam to the north and is between about 50 and a good 100 metres wide. In this area the pond is a maximum of 8 metres deep. The rest of the lake area is made up of a widening of the small river to about 20 20 metres, which runs for several hundred metres before the Isenachweiher.

=== Surrounding area ===
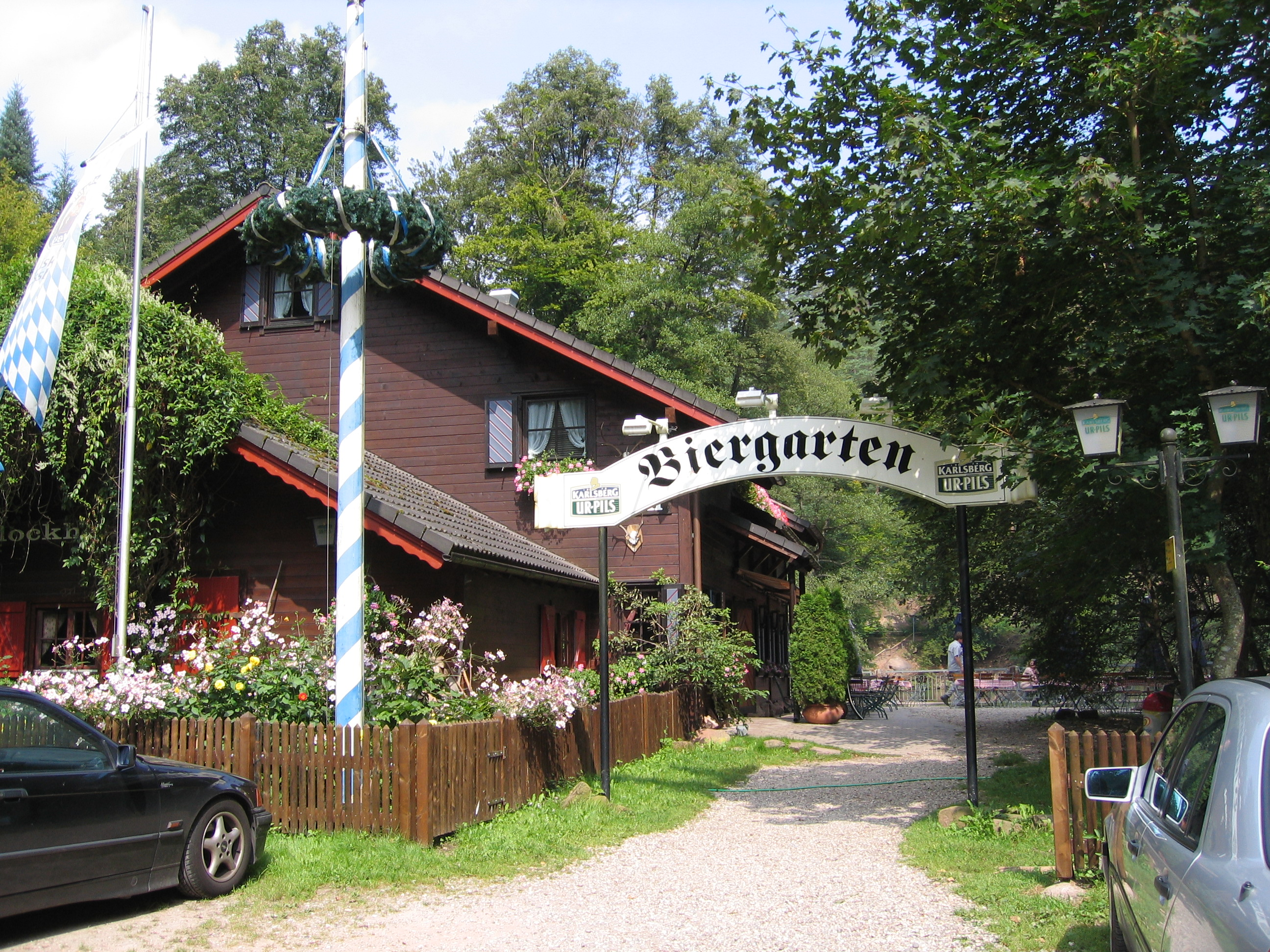
Isenach forester’s lodge

On the southern shore of the pond there was once a reservoir keeper’s house on the dam. It was used in the early 20th century as a forester’s lodge, but from the 1930s as a restaurant for day trippers. In November 1983 the house burnt down to its foundation walls. In 1990 work began in 2 stages on a large, wooden log cabin intended as an inn with a beer garden, which was called the Forsthaus zur Isenach (“Isenach Forester’s Lodge”). Rowing boats for use on the lake were available for hire here. An unmetalled car park is located on the dam immediately in front of the house, and there is another on the B 37 at the junction with the access road.
