= Riveris (river) =

River in Germany

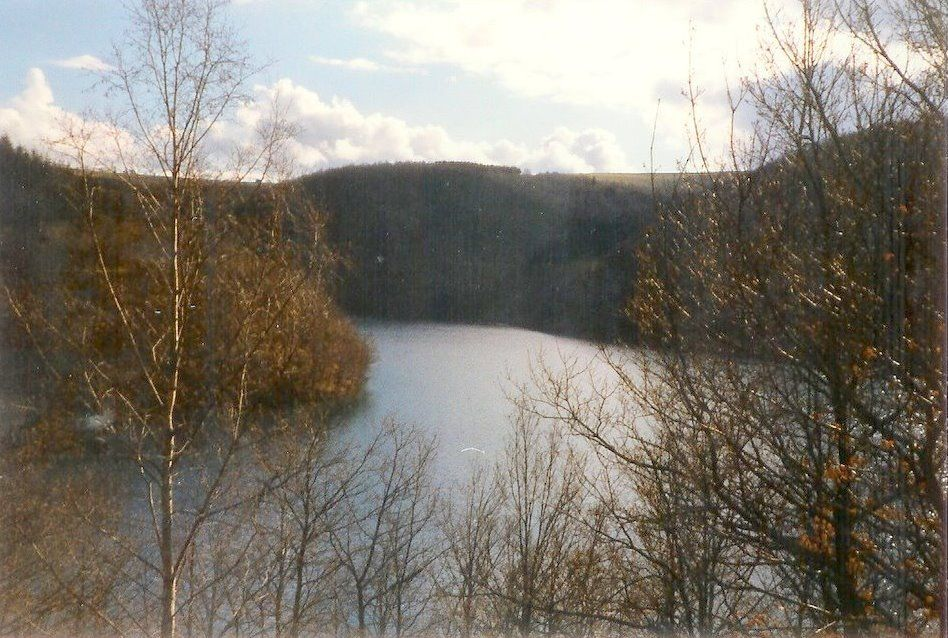
- Riveris Dam

Location
- Country: Germany
- State: Rhineland-Palatinate
- Reference no.: DE: 26568

Physical characteristics
- Source
  - location: Southeast of Farschweiler
  - coordinates: 49°42′08″N 6°51′04″E
  - elevation: ca. 600 m above sea level (NHN)
- Mouth
  - location: Near Waldrach into the Ruwer
  - coordinates: 49°44′26″N 6°44′41″E
  - elevation: ca. 164 m above sea level (NHN)
- Length: 13.3 km
- Basin size: 28.866 km²

Basin features
- Progression: Ruwer→ Moselle→ Rhine→ North Sea
- Waterbodies: Reservoirs: Riveris Dam
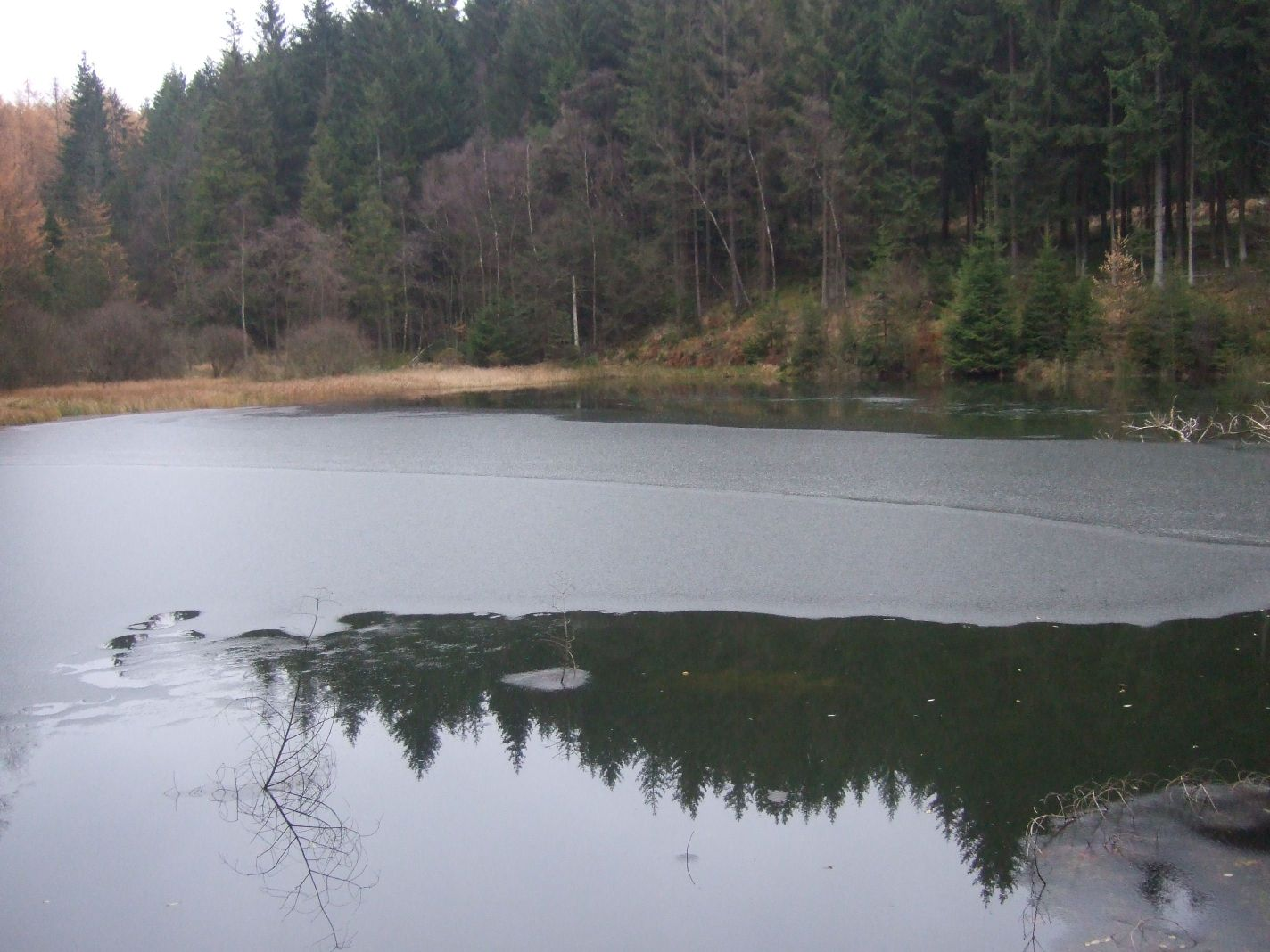
- The Pionierweiher pond at Eschbach

The Riveris is an orographically right-hand, southern tributary of the River Ruwer in the German state of Rhineland-Palatinate. It was impounded in 1953 by the Riveris Dam which inter alia supplies water to the town of Trier. The name Riveris is derived from the Latin and means "little river".

== Geography ==
The Riveris is formed by the confluence of the Eschbach (length: 2.2 km (1.4 mi)) and Altweiherbach (length: 1.8 km (1.1 mi)) at an elevation of 460 m above sea level (NHN). The longer Eschbach rises in the Osburg Forest on the western flank of the Hohe Wurzel (669 m) at a height of 600 m above sea level (NHN). The stream flows mainly in a westerly direction to the Riveris Dam and then turns northwards. The only settlement that the river flows through is the eponymous village of Riveris. After 13.3 kilometres (8.3 mi) the river empties from the right at an elevation of 164 m above NHN into the Ruwer. The river descends through 436 metres at a gradient of 32.8 ‰. The Riveris drains a catchment area of 28.866 km^{2} (11.145 sq mi) and its waters flow through the Ruwer, Moselle and Rhine into the North Sea.

== See also ==
- List of rivers of Rhineland-Palatinate
