= Irserbach =

River in Germany

Location
- Country: Germany
- States: Rhineland-Palatinate; North Rhine-Westphalia

Physical characteristics
- Mouth
  - location: Sieg
  - coordinates: 50.7812°N 7.6274°E
- Length: 12.4 km (7.7 mi)

Basin features
- Progression: Sieg→ Rhine→ North Sea

Irserbach (also: Irsenbach, Scharfenbach) is a river of Rhineland-Palatinate and North Rhine-Westphalia, Germany. It flows into the Sieg near Windeck.

== See also ==
- List of rivers of Rhineland-Palatinate
- List of rivers of North Rhine-Westphalia
