= Gosenbach (Sieg) =

River in Germany

Location
- Country: Germany
- States: North Rhine-Westphalia, Rhineland-Palatinate

Physical characteristics
- Mouth
  - location: Sieg
  - coordinates: 50.8437°N 7.9656°E

Basin features
- Progression: Sieg→ Rhine→ North Sea
- Tributaries
  - right: Schelderbach, Schinderbach

Gosenbach is a small river of North Rhine-Westphalia and Rhineland-Palatinate, Germany. It is 3.3 km long and flows into the Sieg near Mudersbach.

== See also ==
- List of rivers of North Rhine-Westphalia
- List of rivers of Rhineland-Palatinate
