= Reisbach (Palatinate) =

River in Germany

Location
- Country: Germany
- State: Rhineland-Palatinate
- Location: Wasgau
- Reference no.: DE: 237294

Physical characteristics
- Source
  - location: Near Reisdorf, municipality of Böllenborn
  - coordinates: 49°05′29″N 7°54′13″E
  - elevation: 314 m above sea level (NN)
- Mouth
  - location: Near Sankt Germanshof into the Wieslauter
  - coordinates: 49°02′56″N 7°53′19″E
  - elevation: 171 m above sea level (NN)
- Length: 5.6 km
- Basin size: 9.454 km^{2} (3.650 sq mi)

Basin features
- Progression: Lauter→ Rhine→ North Sea

The Reisbach is a 5.6-kilometre (3.5 mi) left bank tributary of the Wieslauter in the eastern Wasgau, the southern part of the Palatine Forest in Germany and northern part of the Vosges.

== Course ==
The Reisbach rises in the vicinity of the hamlet of Reisdorf near Böllenborn and flows in a southerly direction. After just under 2 kilometres it forms the municipal boundary between Schweigen-Rechtenbach and Bobenthal, before it empties into the Wieslauter shortly before Sankt Germanshof in the municipality of Bobenthal.

== See also ==
- List of rivers of Rhineland-Palatinate
