= Langbach (Mauerner Bach) =

River in Germany

Location
- Country: Germany
- State: Bavaria

Physical characteristics
- Mouth
  - location: Mauerner Bach
  - coordinates: 48.5182°N 11.7945°E

Basin features
- Progression: Mauerner Bach→ Amper→ Isar→ Danube→ Black Sea

Langbach is a small river of Bavaria, Germany. It is a right tributary of the Mauerner Bach near Nandlstadt.

== See also ==
- List of rivers of Bavaria
