= Spießbach (Sauer) =

River in Germany

Location
- Country: Germany
- State: Rhineland-Palatinate

Physical characteristics
- Source
  - location: In the southwestern Wasgau
  - coordinates: 49.1109°N 7.7418°E
- Mouth
  - location: East of Fischbach bei Dahn into the Sauer, called Saarbach
  - coordinates: 49.0848°N 7.7280°E

Spießbach is a river of Rhineland-Palatinate, Germany. It is a left tributary of the Sauer.

== See also ==
- List of rivers of Rhineland-Palatinate
