= Gutenbach (Appelbach) =

River in Rhineland-Palatinate, Germany

Location
- Country: Germany
- State: Rhineland-Palatinate

Physical characteristics
- Source
  - location: east of Schneebergerhof (part of Gerbach)
  - coordinates: 49.6816°N 7.9012°E
- Mouth
  - location: into the Appelbach in Oberhausen an der Appel
  - coordinates: 49.7204°N 7.8684°E

Basin features
- Progression: Appelbach→ Nahe→ Rhine→ North Sea

Gutenbach is a river of Rhineland-Palatinate, Germany. It springs east of Schneebergerhof (part of Gerbach). It is a right tributary of the Appelbach in Oberhausen an der Appel.

== See also ==
- List of rivers of Rhineland-Palatinate
