= Brohlbach (Moselle) =

River in Germany

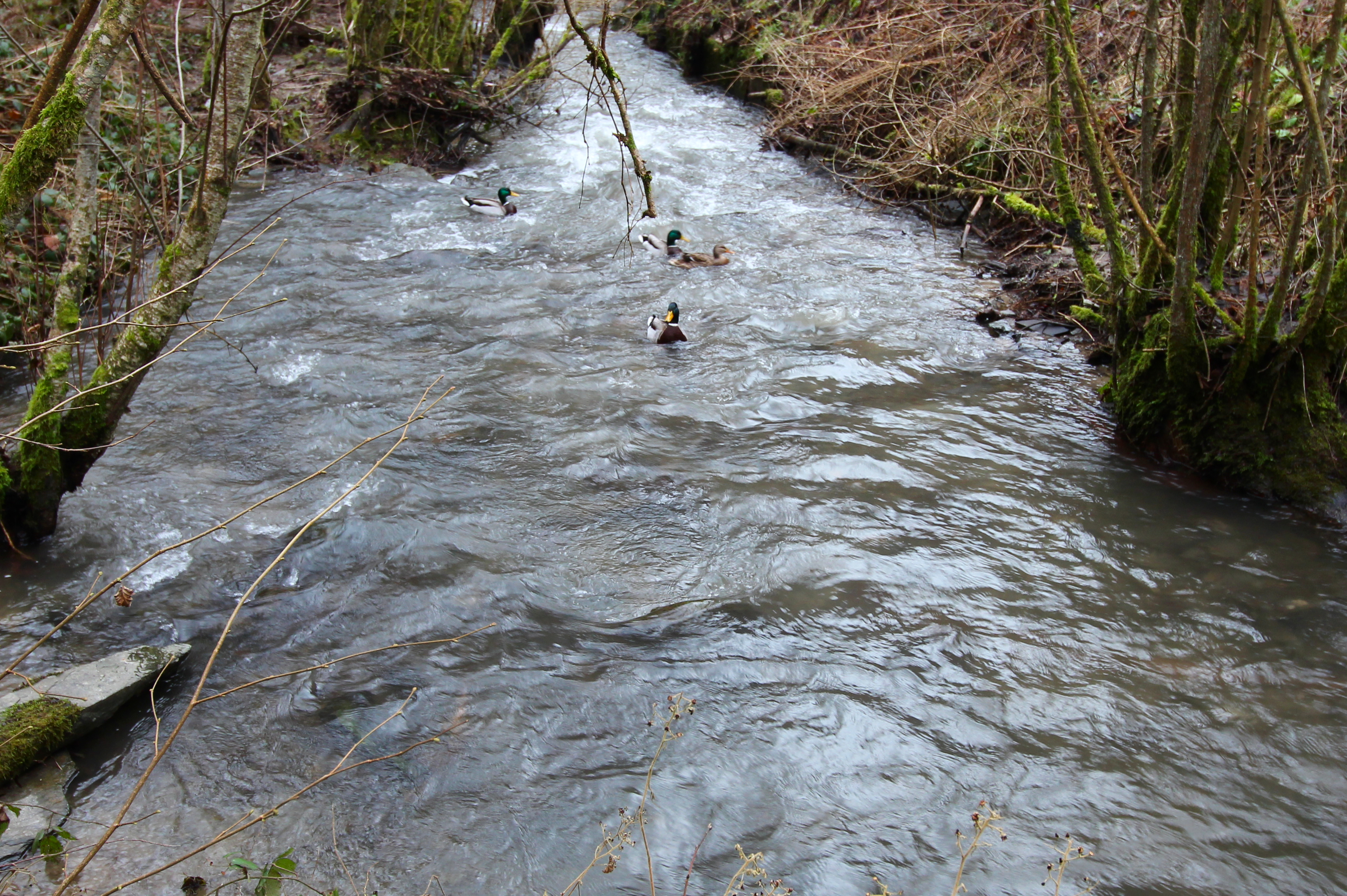
- The Brohlbach at the ruins of the mill Gillesmühle north of Karden

Location
- Country: Germany
- State: Rhineland-Palatinate

Physical characteristics
- Mouth: Moselle
  - location: Treis-Karden, Rhineland-Palatinate, Germany
  - coordinates: 50°11′03″N 7°18′13″E
- Length: 19.8 km (12.3 mi)

Basin features
- Progression: Moselle→ Rhine→ North Sea

Brohlbach is a river of Rhineland-Palatinate, Germany. It is a left tributary of the Moselle at Treis-Karden.

== History ==
The Brohlbach's source near Düngenheim is 472 m.a.s.l. It flows through the municipalities of Kaisersesch and Cochem in the Cochem-Zell district. It then flows through the area of the municipalities of Eulgem, Gamlen, Kaifenheim, Brachtendorf, Dünfus, Forst (Eifel) and Brohl. In Treis-Karden at 82 m.a.s.l. it flows into the Moselle.

== Catchment area ==
The Brohlbach has a catchment area of 35 square kilometres (14 sq mi).

== See also ==
- List of rivers of Rhineland-Palatinate
