= Lehbach =

River in Germany

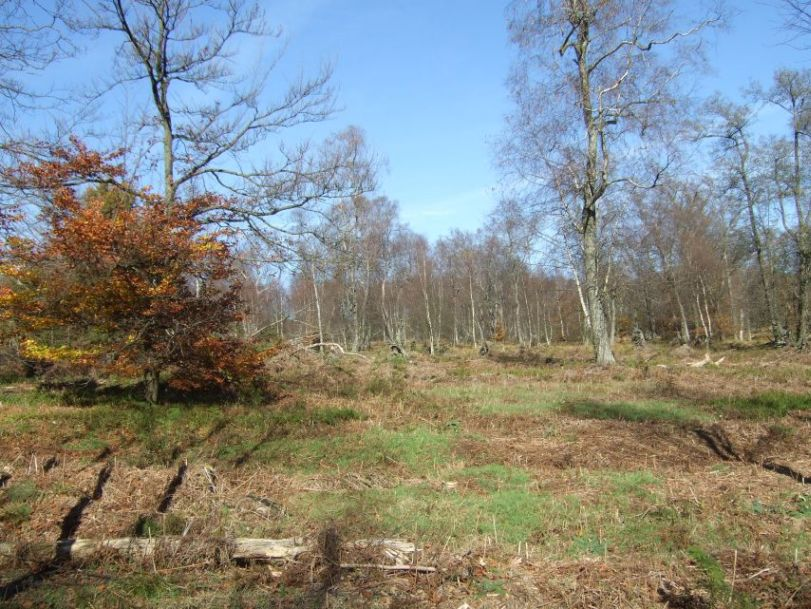
- Raised bog at Ellersbach

Location
- Country: Germany
- State: Rhineland-Palatinate
- Reference no.: DE: 26562

Physical characteristics
- Source
  - location: In the Osburger Hochwald at the foot of the Rösterkopf
  - coordinates: 49°40′00″N 6°48′56″E
  - elevation: ca. 640 m above sea level (NN)
- Mouth
  - location: Near Niederkell into the Ruwer
  - coordinates: 49°37′14″N 6°47′11″E
  - elevation: ca. 426 m above sea level (NN)
- Length: 6.6 km (4.1 mi)
- Basin size: 12.794 km^{2} (4.940 sq mi)

Basin features
- Progression: Ruwer→ Moselle→ Rhine→ North Sea

The Lehbach, in its upper reaches also called Spalbach, is a right-hand tributary of the Ruwer in the county of Trier-Saarburg in the German state of Rhineland-Palatinate. It has a length of 6.602 kilometres (4.102 mi), a catchment area of 12.794 square kilometres (4.940 sq mi). Its GKZ is 26562.

It rises in the highlands of the Osburger Hochwald at the foot of the Rösterkopf mountain and, together with the 3.205-kilometre-long (1.991 mi) Ellersbach (also Kreidbach), in whose source region is a raised bog, impounded to form the Keller Reservoir.

The Lehbach lies within the Naturschutzgebiet (nature reserve) of Keller Mulde and discharges near Niederkell into the Ruwer.

== See also ==
- List of rivers of Rhineland-Palatinate
