= Großbach (Ruwer) =

River in Germany

Grossbach
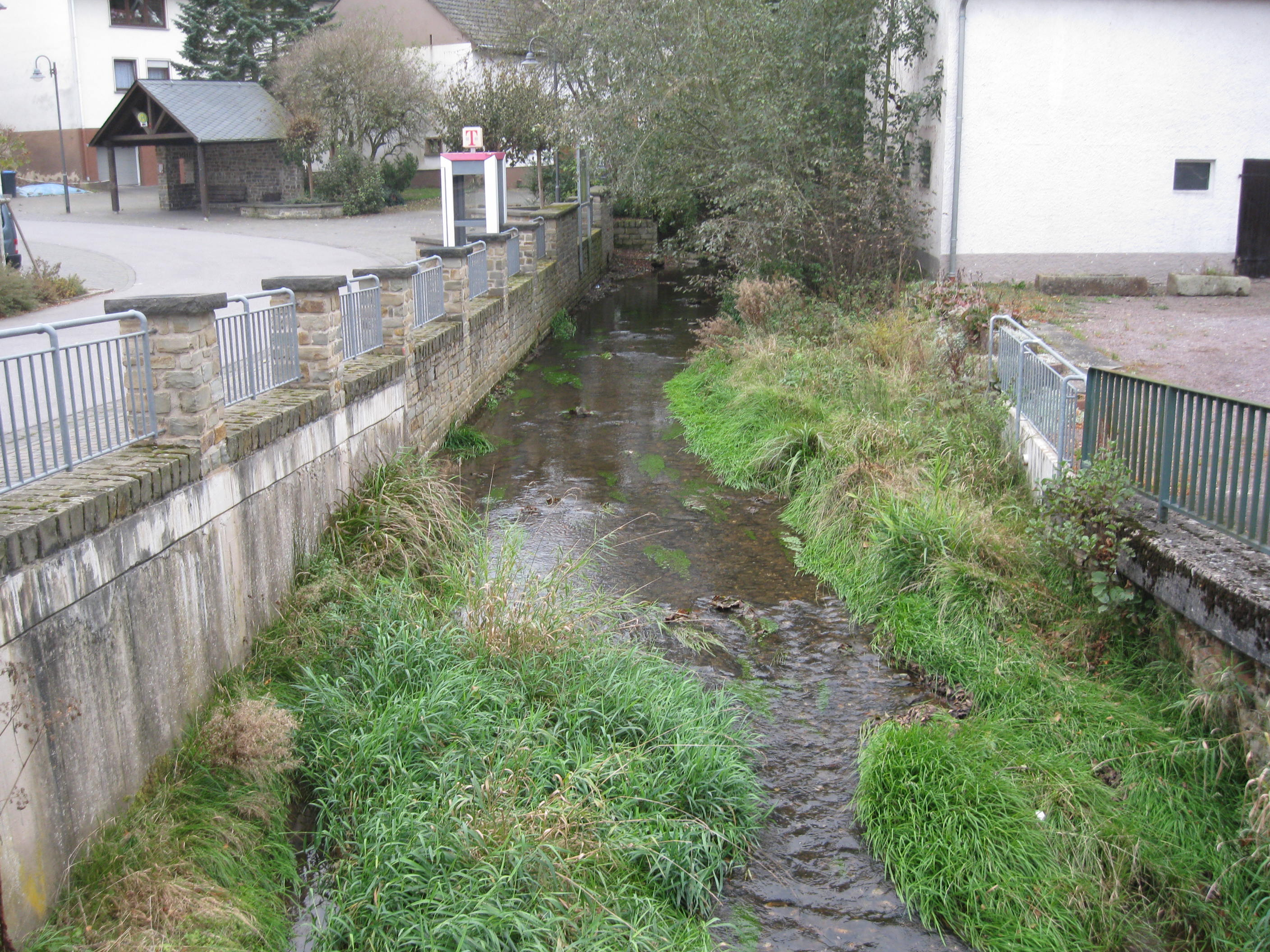
- The Großbach in Zerf

Location
- Country: Germany
- State: Rhineland-Palatinate
- Reference no.: DE: 26564

Physical characteristics
- Source
  - location: Source region: Near Greimerath
  - coordinates: 49°32′57″N 6°33′26″E
  - elevation: ca. 433 m above sea level (NN)
- Mouth
  - location: Near Niederzerf into the Ruwer
  - coordinates: 49°36′16″N 6°41′18″E
  - elevation: ca. 345 m above sea level (NN)
- Length: 7.67 km
- Basin size: 27.77 km²

Basin features
- Progression: Ruwer→ Moselle→ Rhine→ North Sea

The Großbach is a river in the district of Trier-Saarburg in the German state of Rhineland-Palatinate. It has a length of 7.67 kilometres and a catchment area of 27.77 km^{2}.

Its right-hand tributaries are the Eselsbach near Greimerath with a length of 6.69 km and a catchment of 8.63 km^{2}, the Bingelbach between Greimerath and Zerf with a length of about 1.7 km and the Ellerborn near Oberzerf (part of Zerf) with a length of 1.54 km and catchment of 1.53 km^{2}.

The Großbach discharges into the Ruwer at Niederzerf (part of Zerf).

== See also ==
- List of rivers of Rhineland-Palatinate
