= Gerbach =

- Municipality
- Coat of arms

- Location of Gerbach within Donnersbergkreis district
- Interactive map of Gerbach
- Location within Germany Location within Rhineland-Palatinate
- Coordinates: 49°40′24.82″N 7°52′14.4″E
- Country: Germany
- State: Rhineland-Palatinate
- District: Donnersbergkreis
- Municipal assoc.: Nordpfälzer Land

Government
  - Mayor (2019–24): Daniel Heinz

Area
  - Total: 7.32 km^{2} (2.83 sq mi)
- Elevation: 257 m (843 ft)

Population (2025-12-31)
  - Total: 479
  - Density: 65.4/km^{2} (169/sq mi)
- Time zone: UTC+01:00 (CET)
  - Summer (DST): UTC+02:00 (CEST)
- Postal codes: 67813
- Dialling codes: 06361
- Vehicle registration: KIB

Gerbach is a municipality in the Donnersbergkreis district, in Rhineland-Palatinate, Germany.

== Geography ==
The village is located on the Appelbach in the North Palatinate Highlands, northwest of the Donnersberg, between Kaiserslautern and Bad Kreuznach. Gerbach also includes the residential areas Althof, Kahlenbergweiher, Köhlerhof and Schneebergerhof.[2] The Campingpark Pfalz is also located in the municipal area.

== History ==
The first written record dates back to 1192. Until the end of the 18th century, Gerbach belonged to the county of Falkenstein.

The First Coalition War took over the left bank of the Rhine in 1794. From 1798 to 1814, Gerbach belonged to the canton of Kirchheim (also called Kirchheimbolanden) in the department of Donnersberg. As a result of the Congress of Vienna, he was Bavarian from 1816 to 1945. In 1946, the newly formed state of Rhineland-Palatinate incorporated Gerbach, which had been part of the French occupation zone after the Second World War.

== Politics ==
The municipal council in Gerbach consists of twelve council members who were elected in a majority vote at the local elections on 26 May 2019, and the honorary local mayor as chairman.

== Emblem ==
Blasonation: "In gold on a green shield foot a green frog, behind it a willow with brown trunk and green foliage."

== Economy and Infrastructure ==
In Gerbach there is a primary school that is also responsible for Bayerfeld-Steckweiler, Dielkirchen, St. Alban, Ruppertsecken, and Würzweiler.

The L 385 and L 400 intersect in the village. The A-63 in the southeast connects to long-distance traffic. In Rockenhausen there is a train station of the Alsenztalbahn.

Founded in 1861, Gerbach boasts a highly traditional male choral society. In 2011, there was an anniversary celebration (150 years). Furthermore, a carnival club is very active in the community as well as a sports club (soccer, table tennis, aerobics).

== Buildings ==
In the village there is the catholic church St. Michael.

At Gerbach, there is the world's most powerful wind turbine, an Enercon E-126 with an axis height of 135 metres and a rotor diameter of 127 metres with a generation capacity of 7.5 MW. At the end of 2013, a rotor blade came loose and crashed to the ground. Several cracked bolts on the rotor blade attachment caused this. Repairs brought the turbine back into operation in May 2014.
