= Mandelbach (Prüm) =

River in Germany

Location
- Country: Germany
- State: Rhineland-Palatinate

Physical characteristics
- Source
  - location: South of Lichtenborn
  - coordinates: 50.1029°N 6.2987°E
- Mouth
  - location: Into the Prüm at Manderscheid
  - coordinates: 50.1074°N 6.3517°E

Basin features
- Progression: Prüm→ Sauer→ Moselle→ Rhine→ North Sea

Mandelbach (German pronunciation: [ˈmandl̩ˌbax]) is a river of Rhineland-Palatinate, Germany.

The Mandelbach springs south of Lichtenborn. It is a right tributary of the Prüm in Manderscheid.

== See also ==
- List of rivers of Rhineland-Palatinate
