= Floßbach (Isenach) =

River in Germany

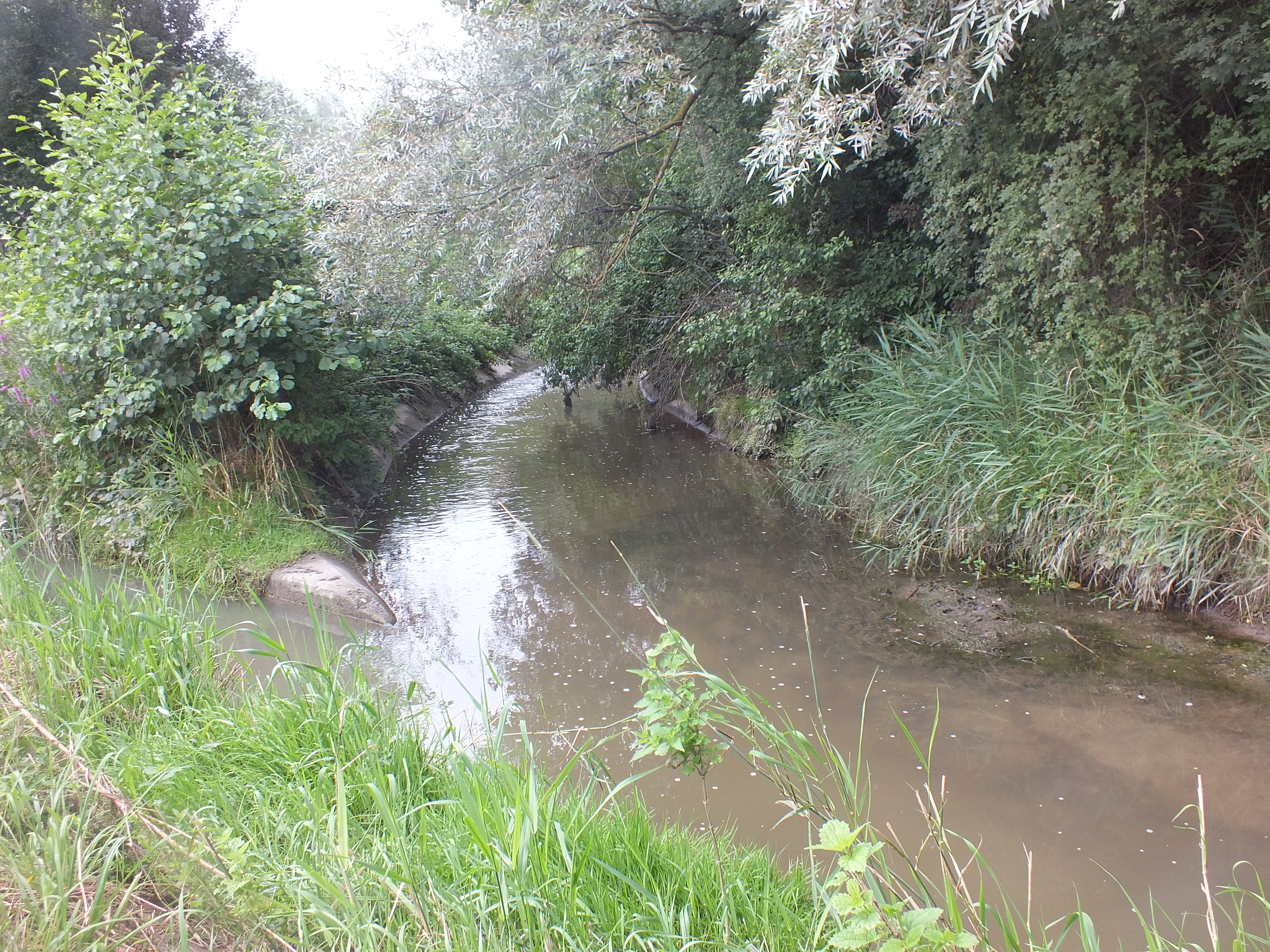
- Mouth of the Stechgraben on the Floßbach (Floßbach from l to r)

Location
- Location: Germany Rhineland-Palatinate Anterior Palatinate
- Reference no.: DE: 2391488

Physical characteristics
- Source
  - location: Diversion: Northeast of Schifferstadt to the left from the Rehbach
  - coordinates: 49°24′02″N 8°23′30″E
  - elevation: ca. 95 m above sea level (NHN)
- Mouth
  - location: East of Lambsheim from the right into the Isenach
  - coordinates: 49°30′24″N 8°18′18″E
  - elevation: ca. 92 m above sea level (NHN)
- Length: 16.04 km
- Basin size: 169.328 km²

Basin features
- Progression: Isenach→ Rhine→ North Sea
- Tributaries
  - left: Schwabenbach, Stechgraben

The Floßbach (also Floßgraben or Floßkanal, formerly Flotzbach or Flotzbachgraben) is a man-made river 16 kilometres (9.9 mi) long. It is an orographically right-hand tributary of the Isenach in the German state of Rhineland-Palatinate. It was built in the 18th century to enable the timber rafting of firewood.

== Literature ==
- Wolfgang Kunz: Die Trift auf dem "Floßbach". In: Wolfgang Kunz, Henning Cramer, Wolfgang Fluck: Maxdorf. Geschichte und Natur. Knecht-Verlag, Landau, 2014, ISBN 978-3-939427-19-3, S. 147–165.
- Bernd-Stefan Grewe: Der versperrte Wald. Ressourcenmangel in der bayerischen Pfalz (1814–1870) (= Umwelthistorische Forschungen, Vol. 1). Böhlau Verlag, Cologne/Weimar/Vienna, 2004, ISBN 3-412-10904-5, pp. 292–302 (covers timber rafting in the Palatinate in general; for the Floßbach see p. 293).
