= Langbach (Kyll) =

River in Germany

Location
- Country: Germany
- States: North Rhine-Westphalia; Rhineland-Palatinate

Physical characteristics
- Mouth
  - location: Kyll
  - coordinates: 50.3733°N 6.4191°E

Basin features
- Progression: Kyll→ Moselle→ Rhine→ North Sea

Langbach (also: Röhlesbach or Roderbach) is a small river of North Rhine-Westphalia and Rhineland-Palatinate, Germany. It is a right tributary of the Kyll near Frauenkron.

== See also ==
- List of rivers of Rhineland-Palatinate
