= Sauer (Altenau) =

River in Germany

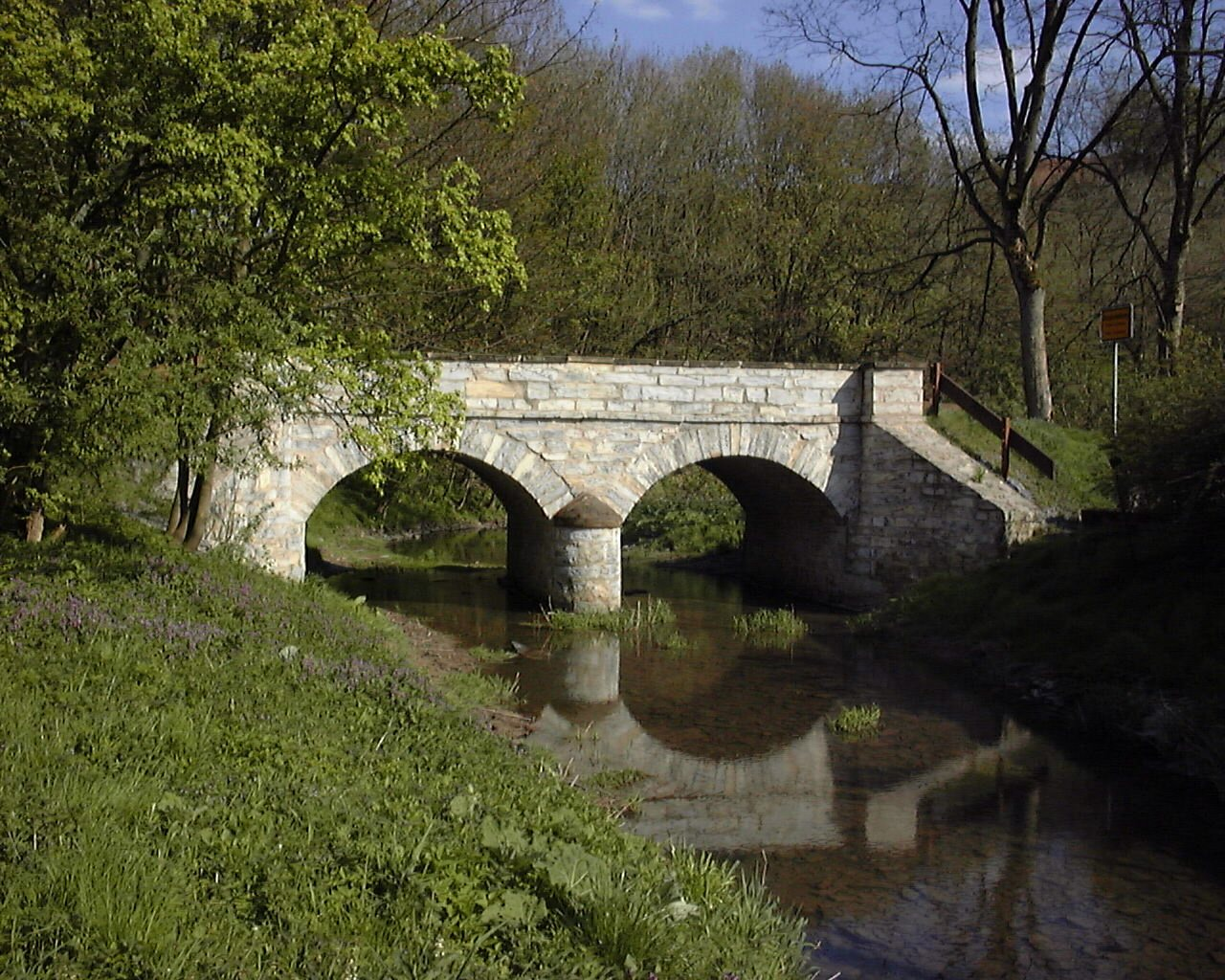

Location
- Country: Germany
- State: North Rhine-Westphalia

Physical characteristics
- Mouth
  - location: Altenau
  - coordinates: 51.6°N 8.8°E
- Length: 29.9 km (18.6 mi)
- Basin size: 110 km^{2} (42 sq mi)

Basin features
- Progression: Altenau→ Alme→ Lippe→ Rhine→ North Sea

Sauer is a river of North Rhine-Westphalia, Germany. It is a right tributary of the Altenau, which it joins in Atteln.

== See also ==
- List of rivers of North Rhine-Westphalia
