= Ellerbach (Nahe) =

River in Germany

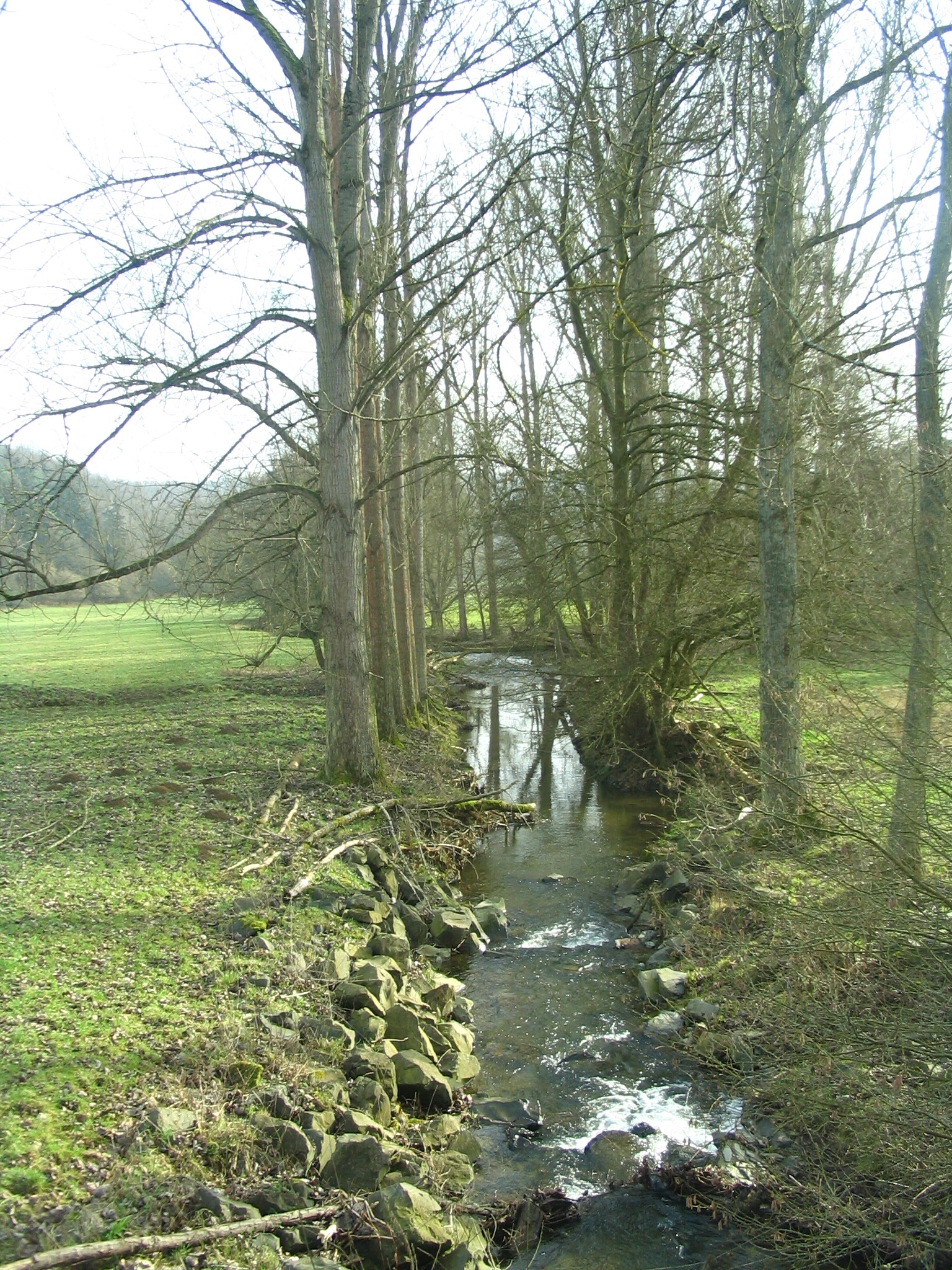
- The Ellerbach at Winterburg

Location
- Country: Germany
- State: Rhineland-Palatinate

Physical characteristics
- Mouth
  - location: Nahe
  - coordinates: 49.8463°N 7.8580°E

Basin features
- Progression: Nahe→ Rhine→ North Sea

Ellerbach is a river of Rhineland-Palatinate, Germany. It is a left tributary of the Nahe.

== See also ==
- List of rivers of Rhineland-Palatinate
