= Mosbruch =

- Municipality
- Coat of arms

- Location of Mosbruch within Vulkaneifel district
- Interactive map of Mosbruch
- Location within Germany Location within Rhineland-Palatinate
- Coordinates: 50°15′41″N 6°56′22″E
- Country: Germany
- State: Rhineland-Palatinate
- District: Vulkaneifel
- Municipal assoc.: Kelberg

Government
  - Mayor (2019–24): Jürgen Gitzen

Area
  - Total: 3.39 km^{2} (1.31 sq mi)
- Elevation: 489 m (1,604 ft)

Population (2025-12-31)
  - Total: 159
  - Density: 46.9/km^{2} (121/sq mi)
- Time zone: UTC+01:00 (CET)
  - Summer (DST): UTC+02:00 (CEST)
- Postal codes: 56767
- Dialling codes: 02692
- Vehicle registration: DAU
- Website: www.mosbruch.de

Mosbruch is an Ortsgemeinde – a municipality belonging to a Verbandsgemeinde, a kind of collective municipality – in the Vulkaneifel district in Rhineland-Palatinate, Germany. It belongs to the Verbandsgemeinde of Kelberg, whose seat is in the like-named municipality.

== Geography ==
The municipality lies in the Vulkaneifel, a part of the Eifel known for its volcanic history, geographical and geological features, and even ongoing activity today, including gases that sometimes well up from the earth.

The Üßbach stream rises near Mosbruch. The foremost point of interest, however, is the Mosbrucher Weiher, a dried-up maar and today a nature conservation area.

== History ==
Bearing witness to prehistoric settlement in what is now Mosbruch is a group of six barrows of unknown date sitting on a ridge northwest of the village. They have, however, been damaged by grave-robbing activities, and finds made at the site in the 19th and 20th centuries have been lost.

In 1440 came a documentary reference to two places, Mosbruch and Zum Ried. The former has since absorbed the latter, but there are still two chapels in the municipality, one for each of the two formerly separate municipalities. In feudal times, the Üßbach formed the border between the Electorate of Cologne and the Electorate of Trier.

Zum Ried (“At the Reedbed”) is also spelt “Zumried”.

== Politics ==
=== Municipal council ===
The council is made up of 6 council members, who were elected by majority vote at the municipal election held on 7 June 2009, and the honorary mayor as chairman.

=== Mayor ===
Mosbruch's mayor is Jürgen Gitzen.

=== Coat of arms ===
The German blazon reads: Von Silber und Rot geviert; 1. ein schwarzes Balkenkreuz, 2. ein silberner Äbtissinenstab, 3. zwei silberene gekreuzte Kerzen, 4. eine rote Raute.

The municipality's arms might in English heraldic language be described thus: Quarterly, first argent a cross sable, second gules issuant from fess point an abbess's staff bendwise sinister of the first, third gules two candles with fire per saltire of the first, and fourth argent a lozenge of the third.

The black cross in the first quartering is the charge formerly borne by the Electorate of Cologne, to which Mosbruch belonged ecclesiastically until 1803. The Electors of Cologne also owned the Mosbrucher Weiher, the now dry (but then still filled with water) maar, in which fish were raised. The silver abbess's staff in the second quartering stands for Saint Mechtildis, the patron saint of the chapel in Zumried (formerly a separate municipality but now part of Mosbruch). The candles per saltire (that is, in the manner of an X-shaped cross) stand for Saint Blaise, the patron saint of the chapel in Mosbruch. In feudal times, the village belonged to the County of Virneburg, whose Counts bore as an armorial charge seven lozenges in two rows, of four and three. A single lozenge has become a charge in Mosbruch's arms to represent these former lords.

== Culture and sightseeing ==
Buildings:

- Catholic branch church, Zum Weiher 1, triaxial aisleless church from 1857.
- Catholic chapel, Zumriederstraße, biaxial aisleless church from 18th/19th century.
- Hauptstraße 12 – estate complex, timber-frame house from 19th century, timber-frame commercial building, partly solid, 18th/19th century.
- Friedrichsmühle (mill), south of the village on the Üßbach.
