= Ellerbach (Moselle) =

River in Germany

Location
- Country: Germany
- State: Rhineland-Palatinate

Physical characteristics
- Source
  - location: West of Büchel
  - coordinates: 50.1728°N 7.0691°E
- Mouth
  - location: At Ediger-Eller into the Moselle
  - coordinates: 50.1009°N 7.1387°E

Basin features
- Progression: Moselle→ Rhine→ North Sea

Waterfall Ellerbach

Ellerbach is a river of Rhineland-Palatinate, Germany.

The Ellerbach springs west of Büchel. It is a left tributary of the Moselle at Ediger-Eller.

== See also ==
- List of rivers of Rhineland-Palatinate
