= Lohrbach (Kyll) =

River in Germany

Location
- Country: Germany
- State: Rhineland-Palatinate

Physical characteristics
- Source
  - location: West of Kordel
  - coordinates: 49.8478°N 6.6725°E
- Mouth
  - location: South of Kordel and west of Ramstein Castle into the Kyll
  - coordinates: 49.8225°N 6.6600°E

Basin features
- Progression: Kyll→ Moselle→ Rhine→ North Sea

Lohrbach is a river of Rhineland-Palatinate, Germany.

The Lohrbach springs west of Kordel. It discharges south of Kordel, west of Ramstein Castle from the left into the Kyll.

== See also ==
- List of rivers of Rhineland-Palatinate
