= Mauerner Bach =

River in Germany

Location
- Country: Germany
- State: Bavaria

Physical characteristics
- Mouth
  - location: Amper
  - coordinates: 48.4920°N 11.9396°E
- Length: 11.6 km (7.2 mi)

Basin features
- Progression: Amper→ Isar→ Danube→ Black Sea

Mauerner Bach is a river of Bavaria, Germany. It is a left tributary of the Amper in Wang.

== See also ==
- List of rivers of Bavaria
