= Palmbach (Aar) =

River in Germany

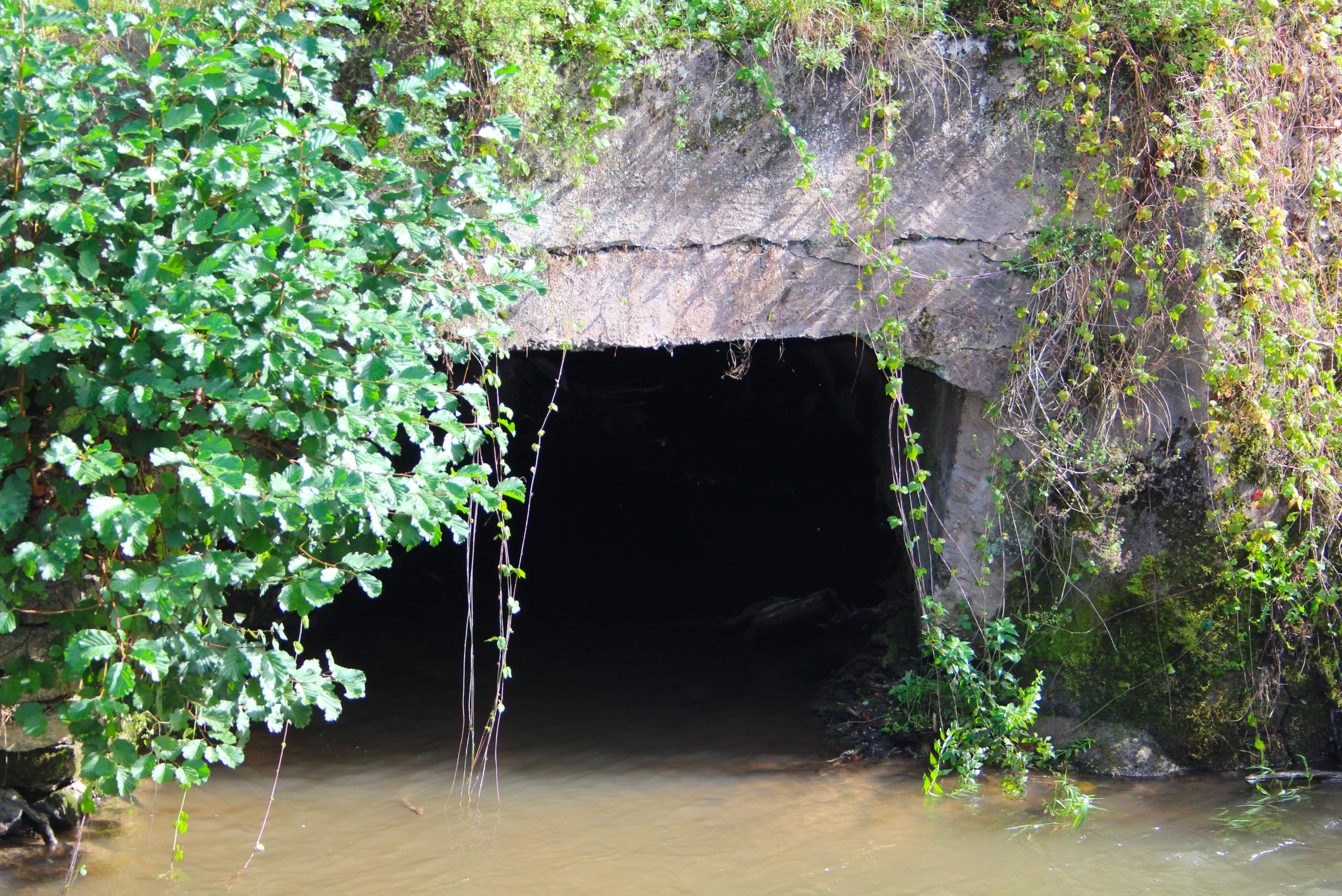
- Mouth of the Palbach into the Aar at Zollhaus (part of Aar-Einrich)

Location
- Country: Germany
- States: Hesse; Rhineland-Palatinate

Physical characteristics
- Mouth
  - location: Aar
  - coordinates: 50.2895°N 8.0642°E
- Length: 10.5 km (6.5 mi)

Basin features
- Progression: Aar→ Lahn→ Rhine→ North Sea

Palmbach is a river of Hesse and Rhineland-Palatinate, Germany. It flows into the Aar near Hahnstätten, at Zollhaus (part of Aar-Einrich).

== See also ==
- List of rivers of Hesse
- List of rivers of Rhineland-Palatinate
