= Riveris =

- Municipality
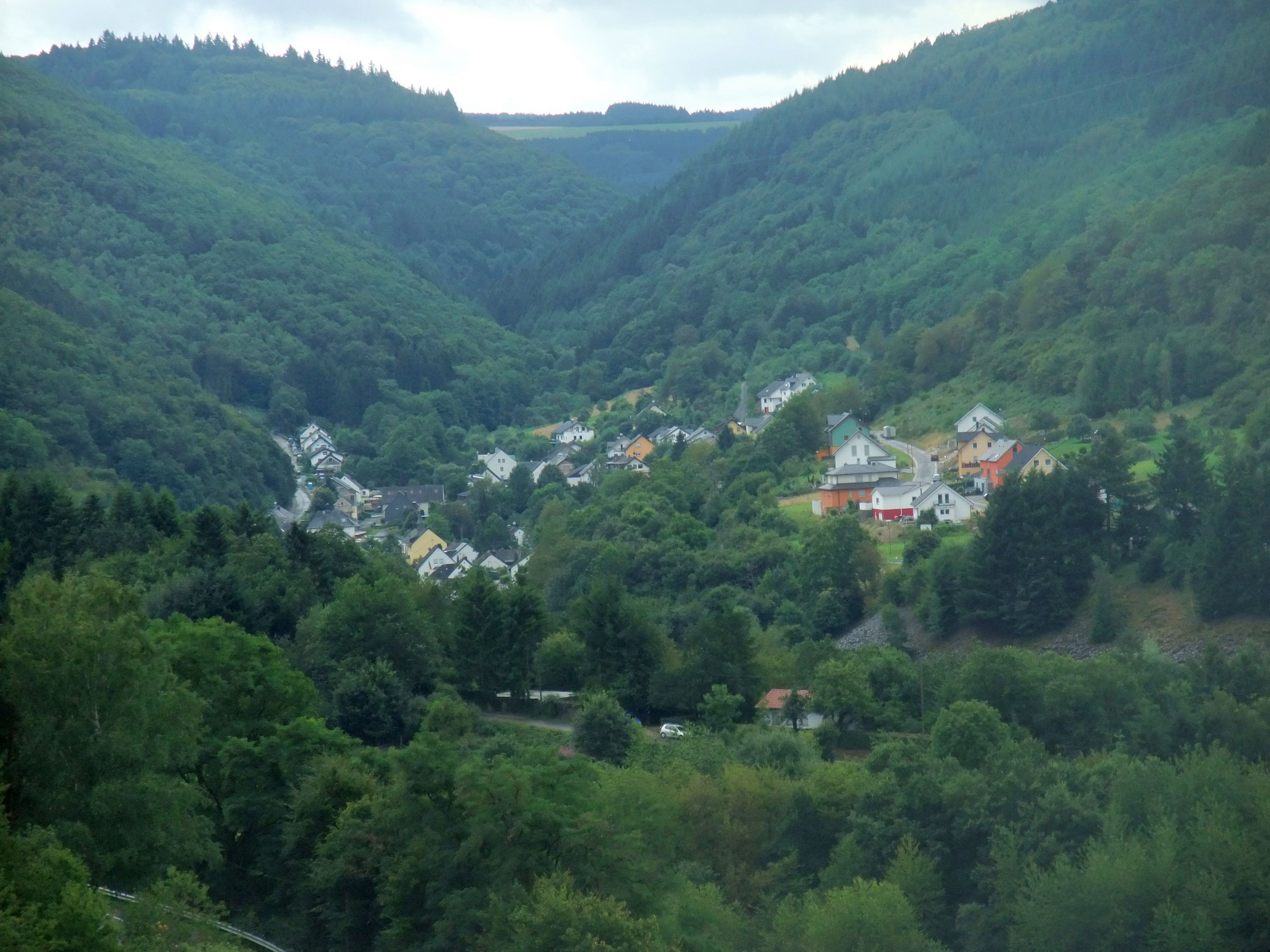

- Coat of arms

- Location of Riveris within Trier-Saarburg district
- Interactive map of Riveris
- Location within Germany Location within Rhineland-Palatinate
- Coordinates: 49°43′34″N 6°45′50″E
- Country: Germany
- State: Rhineland-Palatinate
- District: Trier-Saarburg
- Municipal assoc.: Ruwer

Government
  - Mayor (2019–24): Thomas Hoffmann

Area
  - Total: 2.11 km^{2} (0.81 sq mi)
- Elevation: 220–250 m (720–820 ft)

Population (2025-12-31)
  - Total: 400
  - Density: 190/km^{2} (490/sq mi)
- Time zone: UTC+01:00 (CET)
  - Summer (DST): UTC+02:00 (CEST)
- Postal codes: 54317
- Dialling codes: 06500
- Vehicle registration: TR
- Website: www.riveris.de

Riveris is a municipality in the Trier-Saarburg district, in Rhineland-Palatinate, Germany. The village lies in the valley of the river Riveris.
