= Gillenbach (Queich) =

River in Germany

- The Gillenbach in Hauenstein

Location
- Country: Germany
- State: Rhineland-Palatinate

Physical characteristics
- Mouth
  - location: Queich
  - coordinates: 49.191044°N 7.851879°E

Basin features
- Progression: Queich→ Rhine→ North Sea

Gillenbach (German pronunciation: [ˈɡɪlənbax]) is a river of Rhineland-Palatinate, Germany. It is a right tributary of the Queich at Hauenstein.

== See also ==
- List of rivers of Rhineland-Palatinate
