= Bobenthal =

- Municipality
- Coat of arms

- Location of Bobenthal within Südwestpfalz district
- Interactive map of Bobenthal
- Location within Germany Location within Rhineland-Palatinate
- Coordinates: 49°03′43″N 7°51′26″E
- Country: Germany
- State: Rhineland-Palatinate
- District: Südwestpfalz
- Municipal assoc.: Dahner Felsenland

Government
  - Mayor (2019–24): Markus Keller

Area
  - Total: 21.27 km^{2} (8.21 sq mi)
- Elevation: 221 m (725 ft)

Population (2025-12-31)
  - Total: 259
  - Density: 12.2/km^{2} (31.5/sq mi)
- Time zone: UTC+01:00 (CET)
  - Summer (DST): UTC+02:00 (CEST)
- Postal codes: 76891
- Dialling codes: 06394
- Vehicle registration: PS
- Website: www.bobenthal.de

Bobenthal (German pronunciation: [ˈboːbn̩taːl]) is a municipality in Südwestpfalz district, in Rhineland-Palatinate, western Germany.

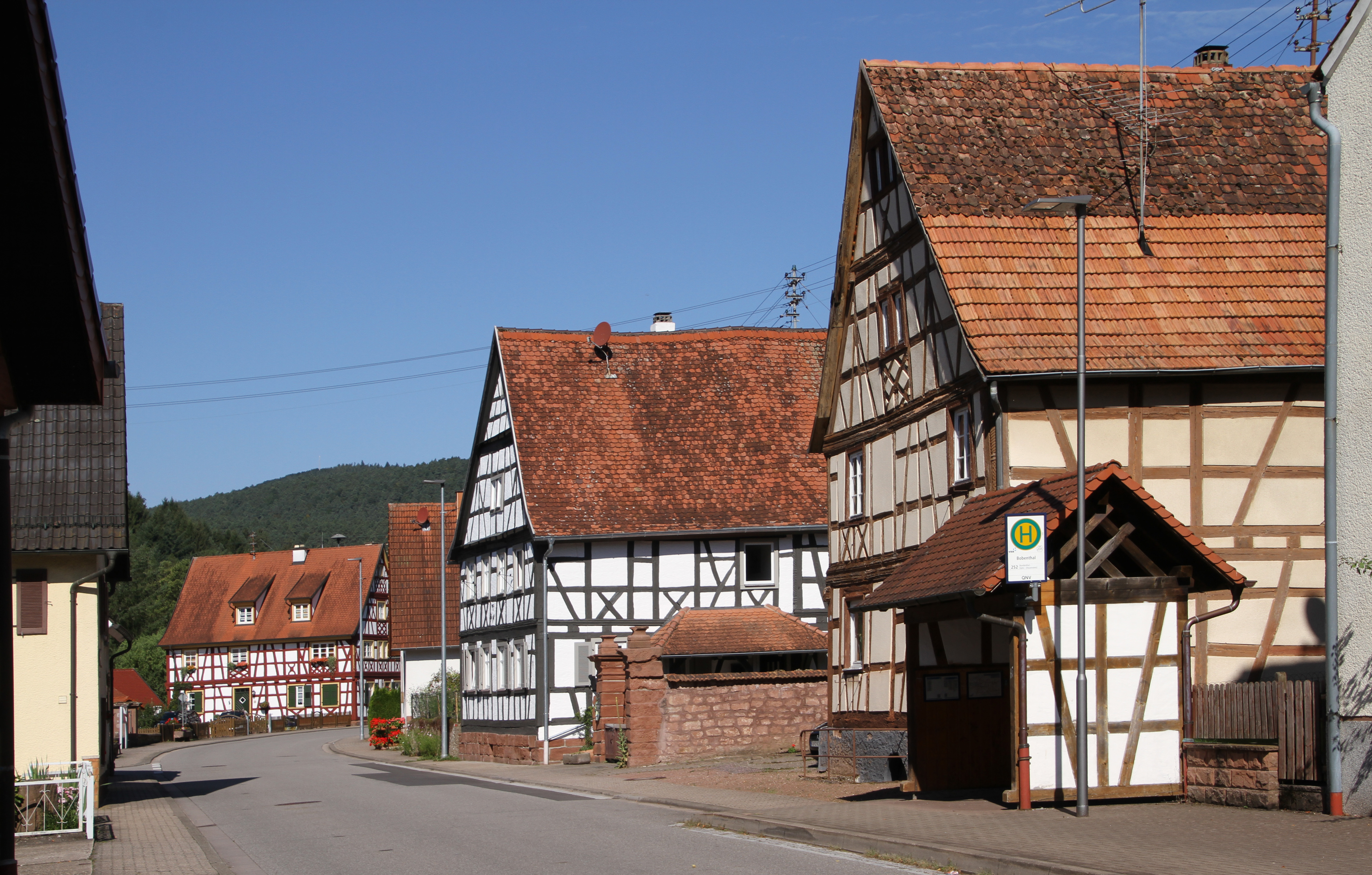
Main street in Bobenthal
