= Üßbach =

River in Germany

- The Üßbach near Bad Bertrich

Location
- Country: Germany
- State: Rhineland-Palatinate
- Districts: Vulkaneifel and Cochem-Zell
- Reference no.: DE: 2684

Physical characteristics
- Source
  - location: Near Mosbruch in the county of Vulkaneifel
  - coordinates: 50°15′39″N 6°57′15″E
  - elevation: ca. 493 m above sea level (NHN)
- Mouth
  - location: Near Alf (Cochem-Zell) into the Alf
  - coordinates: 50°03′29″N 7°06′17″E
  - elevation: ca. 101 m above sea level (NHN)
- Length: 48.743 km (30.287 mi)
- Basin size: 184.96 km^{2} (71.41 sq mi)

Basin features
- Progression: Alf→ Moselle→ Rhine→ North Sea
- Landmarks: Small towns: Ulmen and its quarters of Furth and Meiserich; Villages: Mosbruch, Hörschhausen, Bad Bertrich, Alf
- Tributaries
  - left: Ulmener Bach, Litzbach, Winkelbach, Erdenbach, Purnesbach
  - right: Schönbach, Hahnenbach, Grundbach, Rosselbach, Elbesbach, Hesselbach, Bonsbeurener Bach, Dauselgraben

The Üßbach (also Ueßbach (Note: For its entry in the Geoexplorer the spelling Ueßbach has to be used.) or Üssbach) is a stream, just under 49 km (30 mi) long in the Eifel in the German state of Rhineland-Palatinate. It rises near Mosbruch in the county of Vulkaneifel and empties near Alf (Cochem-Zell) into the eponymous river, just before the Alf discharges into the river Moselle. The spa resort of Bad Bertrich lies on the Üßbach.

== See also ==
- List of rivers of Rhineland-Palatinate
