= Altenau (Alme) =

River in Germany

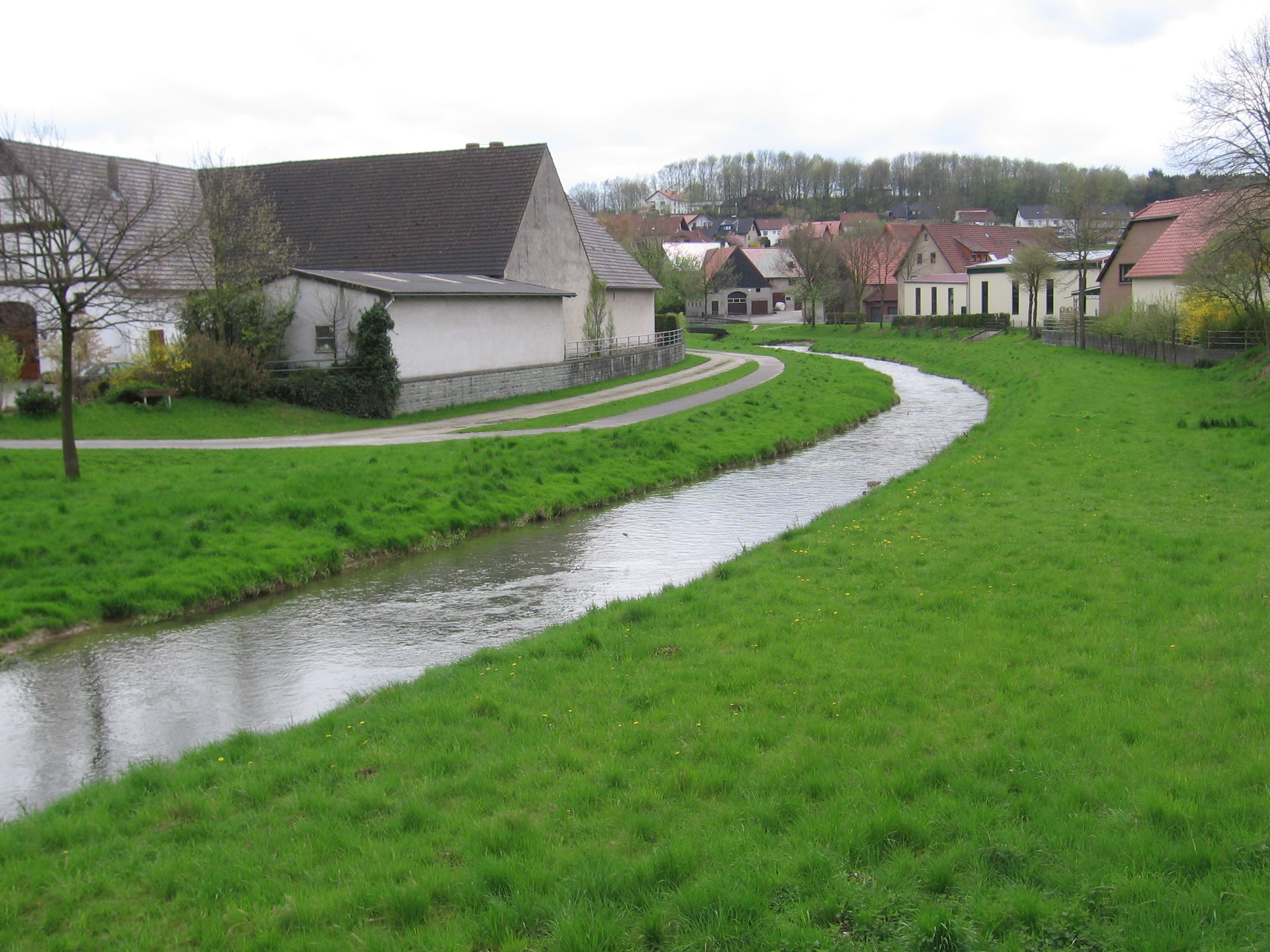

Location
- Country: Germany
- State: North Rhine-Westphalia

Physical characteristics
- Mouth
  - location: Alme
  - coordinates: 51.6714°N 8.7175°E
- Length: 29.1 km (18.1 mi)
- Basin size: 335 km^{2} (129 sq mi)

Basin features
- Progression: Alme→ Lippe→ Rhine→ North Sea

Altenau (German pronunciation: [ˈaltənaʊ]) is a river of North Rhine-Westphalia, Germany. It is a right tributary of the Alme, which it joins in Borchen.

== See also ==
- List of rivers of North Rhine-Westphalia
