= Dreis-Brück =

- Municipality
- Coat of arms

- Location of Dreis-Brück within Vulkaneifel district
- Interactive map of Dreis-Brück
- Location within Germany Location within Rhineland-Palatinate
- Coordinates: 50°15′49″N 6°47′38″E
- Country: Germany
- State: Rhineland-Palatinate
- District: Vulkaneifel
- Municipal assoc.: Daun

Government
  - Mayor (2019–24): Edith Lohr-Hoffmann

Area
  - Total: 18.18 km^{2} (7.02 sq mi)
- Elevation: 470 m (1,540 ft)

Population (2025-12-31)
  - Total: 797
  - Density: 43.8/km^{2} (114/sq mi)
- Time zone: UTC+01:00 (CET)
  - Summer (DST): UTC+02:00 (CEST)
- Postal codes: 54552
- Dialling codes: 06595
- Vehicle registration: DAU
- Website: www.dreis-brueck.de

Dreis-Brück is an Ortsgemeinde – a municipality belonging to a Verbandsgemeinde, a kind of collective municipality – in the Vulkaneifel district in Rhineland-Palatinate, Germany. It belongs to the Verbandsgemeinde of Daun, whose seat is in the like-named town.

== Geography ==
=== Location ===
The municipality lies in the Vulkaneifel, a part of the Eifel known for its volcanic history, geographical and geological features, and even ongoing activity today, including gases that sometimes well up from the earth.

The village centre in Dreis sits at an elevation of 477 m above sea level, while Brück's elevation, also at the village centre, is 520 m above sea level. The municipality stretches over 1 818 ha all together, 820 ha of which is wooded. Several peaks surround the dale in which the municipality's two centres lie, which is also crossed by six streams.

=== Constituent communities ===
Dreis-Brück's Ortsteile are, as its hyphenated name implies, Dreis and Brück.

== History ==
The time in which Dreis was founded is shrouded in darkness. Its beginnings would seem to stretch back to Carolingian times. In 1143, Dreis had its first documentary mention. The placename “Dreis” is obviously derived from the Old High German word triusan (“bubble”, “gush”). The name underwent many changes over the centuries. In the 16th century, besides Dreis, also Dreys and Dreyss were to be found. In the 17th century, alongside Dreyß, the forms Dreiß and Driest also cropped up, the last of which even appeared once as Dryesd in the 18th century. Spellings such as Dress, Dreyss or Dreys also are to be found.

Brück had its first documentary mention only in the 14th century.

The two then separate municipalities once belonged to the Counts of Manderscheid, who held the County of Kerpen, and eventually ended up with the Duchy of Arenberg after an hereditary division of holdings.

On 23 August 1945, shortly after the Second World War had ended, the war claimed three more victims locally. Three youths, Helmut Keul, Ernst Josef Probst and Werner Ullrich, went to the Dreis munitions depot to undertake the disarming of the weapons there, left over from the war. Their efforts resulted in a tremendous explosion that killed all three of them. A memorial cross now stands near the site.

In a written announcement from 28 August 1968, the Daun Amt and town administration stated “the proposal for a fourth law about administrative restructuring in Rhineland-Palatinate presented at the Landtag and already consulted in First Reading provides for the local area the amalgamation of, among others, the localities of … Dockweiler, Dreis and possibly also Brück”. The Dockweiler municipal administration was quite strongly interested in a merger of the municipalities of Dockweiler and Dreis, and possibly also Brück and Betteldorf, and its official plan reflected as much. The plan eventually failed after consensus could not be forged.

On 20 April 1969 the Mainz Ministry of the Interior published a decree about the formation of Verbandsgemeinden in the Regierungsbezirke of Koblenz and Trier. The Daun district administrator's office took the decree further within the district of Daun (since 1 January 2007 the district of Vulkaneifel) with the plan, among others, to assign the municipality of Brück to the Verbandsgemeinde of Kelberg. This move was rejected by both the citizenry and the municipal council.

On 19 May 1970, the Dreis municipal council decided between the two alternatives:

- to dissolve both municipalities and form a new municipality out of what had been until then the municipalities of Dreis and Brück
- to amalgamate the municipality of Brück into the municipality of Dreis.

The citizens of Brück decided, with 99.33% in favour, to amalgamate themselves with Dreis, as long as the name Brück was retained.

On 20 December 1973 came the dissolution of the municipality of Brück, whereupon it was amalgamated with the municipality of Dreis with effect from 16 March 1974. In February 1974 the municipalities’ two councils had concluded a settlement and had decided on a merger.

On 15 August 1977, the Trier Regierungsbezirk administration granted the municipality of Dreis the new name Dreis-Brück. The name change came into force on 1 September 1977.

== Politics ==
=== Municipal council ===
The council is made up of 12 council members, who were elected by majority vote at the municipal election held on 7 June 2009, and the honorary mayor as chairman.

=== Coat of arms ===
The municipality's arms might be described thus: Argent a fountain issuant from whose top two streams, one each to dexter and sinister and each splitting into three, all azure, issuant from base a bridge arched of three sable, in a chief gules three roses Or seeded of the fourth.

The arms were designed by Friedbert Wißkirchen (Daun Verbandsgemeinde administration).

The chief refers to the two centres’ history. They were held by the Counts of Manderscheid, who held the County of Kerpen, and eventually ended up with the Duchy of Arenberg after an hereditary division of holdings. The Dukes of Arenberg bore three roses in their seal. The tinctures Or and gules (gold and red) are those once borne by the Counts of Manderscheid. The arched bridge in base is a canting charge and stands for the name Brück, which closely resembles the German word for “bridge”: Brücke. The fountain also refers to part of the name – Drees – from the Old High German (although it hardly resembles the modern German word for “fountain”: Brunnen). Moreover, the fountain also refers to the municipality's status as the site of a state-recognized health spring, the “Vulkania Quelle” in Dreis.

The Trier Regierungsbezirk administration granted the municipality approval to bear arms in 1986.

== Culture and sightseeing ==
=== Old house names ===
Many older houses in Dreis-Brück have names that have nothing to do with the owners who live in them today. The names come partly from former owners’ names or occupations, but some also draw their names from former uses to which each building was put. Further names also come from various events.

=== Buildings ===
==== Brück ====
- Saint Apollinaris's Catholic Church (branch church), triaxial aisleless church, 1878–1882, expanded possibly after 1945, sandstone shaft cross from 1798.
- Heyrother Straße 9 – former school with hipped mansard roof, Reform architecture, about 1920–1930.
- Im Höfchen 4 a – small timber-frame Quereinhaus (a combination residential and commercial house divided for these two purposes down the middle, perpendicularly to the street), partly solid, apparently from 1850.
- Wayside chapel, southwest of the village on the road to Dreis, plaster building, 18th/19th century.

==== Dreis ====
- Saint Quirinius's Catholic Church (branch church), Hillesheimer Straße 9, biaxial aisleless church from 1823.
- Am Ahbach 4 – house from 1864.
- Breite Straße 10 – former forester's house (?), small corner estate, Reform architecture, about 1920–1930.
- Brunnenstraße 5 – triaxial house, possibly mid 18th century.
- Dockweilerstraße 4 – house 17th or earlier half of 18th century, partly remodelled in 1894, courtyard gate from 1777.
- Near Dockweilerstraße 11 – Baroque sandstone Heiligenhäuschen (a small, shrinelike structure consecrated to a saint or saints), latter half of 18th century.
- Hillesheimer Straße 2 – Baroque house from 1791, courtyard gate from 1772.
- Hillesheimer Straße 4 – building with half-hipped gables, possibly from about 1880.
- Hillesheimer Straße 5 – house or corner estate.
- Hillesheimer Straße 8/10 – former school, built in several phases, apparently from 1837, expanded on both sides, possibly in the early 20th century.
- Hillesheimer Straße 17 – Quereinhaus, 19th century.
- Hillesheimer Straße 34 – house from 1860, barn from 18th century.
- Kelberger Straße 4 – building with half-hipped gables, about 1800.
- Ringstraße 1 – so-called Dreiser Burg (castle), three-floored gable house, round stairwell, 1597.
- Ringstraße 2 – timber-frame house, partly solid, from 1741

== Famous people ==
Dreis-Brück is home to the well known crime fiction writer Jacques Berndorf. Even his alter ego, Siggi Baumeister, the fictional protagonist of his Eifel crime stories, lives in Dreis-Brück. Hence, many of these stories are set in the surrounding area.
