= Bongard (disambiguation) =

Bongard can refer to:

== Geography ==
- Bongard, a municipality in western Germany
- Bongard, Iran, a village in Hormozgan Province, Iran
- Bongárd, the Hungarian name for Bungard village, Șelimbăr Commune, Sibiu County, Romania

== Computer science ==
- Bongard problems, is a kind of puzzle invented by the Soviet computer scientist Mikhail Moiseevich Bongard

== People ==
- August Gustav Heinrich von Bongard, a German botanist (1786–1839)
- Josh Bongard (born 1974), a professor in the University of Vermont
- Oscar Bongard (1894–?), French footballer and manager

== Other ==
- Bertram F. Bongard Stakes, an ungraded stakes race at Belmont Park, New York
