= Gattan =

Gattan or Gatan (Persian: گتان) may refer to:

- Gattan-e Olya
- Gattan-e Sofla
