= Brockscheid =

- Municipality
- Coat of arms

- Location of Brockscheid within Vulkaneifel district
- Interactive map of Brockscheid
- Location within Germany Location within Rhineland-Palatinate
- Coordinates: 50°8′05″N 6°50′47″E
- Country: Germany
- State: Rhineland-Palatinate
- District: Vulkaneifel
- Municipal assoc.: Daun

Government
  - Mayor (2019–24): Frank Michels

Area
  - Total: 2.05 km^{2} (0.79 sq mi)
- Elevation: 450 m (1,480 ft)

Population (2025-12-31)
  - Total: 195
  - Density: 95.1/km^{2} (246/sq mi)
- Time zone: UTC+01:00 (CET)
  - Summer (DST): UTC+02:00 (CEST)
- Postal codes: 54552
- Dialling codes: 06573
- Vehicle registration: DAU
- Website: www.brockscheid.de

Brockscheid is an Ortsgemeinde – a municipality belonging to a Verbandsgemeinde, a kind of collective municipality – in the Vulkaneifel district in Rhineland-Palatinate, Germany. It belongs to the Verbandsgemeinde of Daun, whose seat is in the like-named town.

== Geography ==
=== Location ===
The municipality lies in the Vulkaneifel, a part of the Eifel known for its volcanic history, geographical and geological features, and even ongoing activity today, including gases that sometimes well up from the earth.

== History ==
On 9 June 1161, Brockscheid had its first documentary mention when Pope Victor IV approved for the Abbey of Echternach the proclamation of Christ's teaching in Broxsceith (Brockscheid) and Texscith (Tettscheid). Brockscheid was very small at this time, and indeed until 1654, there were only five hearths in the village. Even so, Brockscheid was not without a place of worship, with a church being mentioned as early as 1238. The parish of Brockscheid came to include Udler and Tettscheid in 1804, an arrangement that still stands today. In 1862, the Magi were cast aside as the village's patrons, with their place taken by Saint Ursula.

Also bound with the village's history is the old, now ruined, castle, Burg Freudenstein, whose remnants can still be seen in the woods. There does not seem to have been any official link between this castle and the village, however. The castle was mentioned about 1340 as belonging to the Counts of Luxembourg, although Brockscheid itself was within the Electoral-Trier Amt of Daun.

In 1840, a new industry cropped up in Brockscheid that brought the municipality some measure of fame. August Mark founded a foundry where bells were poured, and indeed the industry continues today with two such foundries in the municipality.

== Politics ==
=== Municipal council ===
The council is made up of 6 council members, who were elected at the municipal election held on 7 June 2009, and the honorary mayor as chairman.

=== Mayor ===
Brockscheid's mayor is Frank Michels.

=== Coat of arms ===
The German blazon reads: Durch schwarze, oben gezinnte Leiste geteilt, oben in Silber drei rote Kronen balkenweise, unten in Gold eine rote Glocke.

The municipality's arms might in English heraldic language be described thus: A bar embattled enhanced sable, above which argent three crowns in fess gules, and below which Or a bell of the third.

The bar embattled (that is, the narrow horizontal stripe with the upper edge resembling battlements on a castle wall) stands for the now ruined castle, Burg Freudenstein, found within Brockscheid's municipal limits. The three crowns stand for the Magi, who until 1862 were the village's patrons. The tinctures argent and gules (silver and red) refer to the village's former status as a municipality within the Electoral-Trier Amt of Daun. Below the bar, the tinctures are Or and gules (gold and red), which were those borne by the old Lords of Daun in their arms. These lords had patronage rights at the local church. The bell stands for the bellfounder's profession, which began in Brockscheid in 1840 and continues today.

The arms have been borne since 12 November 1987.

== Culture and sightseeing ==
=== Archaeological monuments ===
Halfway towards the Lieser valley, the foundations of the so-called Geisenburg can be made out. This castle was originally known as the Freudenburg.

=== Buildings ===
- Saint Ursula’s Catholic Parish Church, Am Kirchplatz 5, mediaeval quire tower, made taller in the 18th century, tent roof from 1843, in the churchyard a sandstone shaft cross from the 18th century
- Glockenstraße 39 – stately Quereinhaus (a combination residential and commercial house divided for these two purposes down the middle, perpendicularly to the street) apparently from 1816

== Economy and infrastructure ==
=== Bell foundries ===
Located in Brockscheid are two of Germany's few remaining bell foundries. The Eifeler Glockengießerei is currently run by Europe's only woman master bellfounder.
