= Kirchweiler =

- Municipality
- Coat of arms

- Location of Kirchweiler within Vulkaneifel district
- Interactive map of Kirchweiler
- Location within Germany Location within Rhineland-Palatinate
- Coordinates: 50°13′50″N 6°44′44″E
- Country: Germany
- State: Rhineland-Palatinate
- District: Vulkaneifel
- Municipal assoc.: Daun

Government
  - Mayor (2019–24): Reiner Berlingen

Area
  - Total: 6.31 km^{2} (2.44 sq mi)
- Elevation: 540 m (1,770 ft)

Population (2025-12-31)
  - Total: 396
  - Density: 62.8/km^{2} (163/sq mi)
- Time zone: UTC+01:00 (CET)
  - Summer (DST): UTC+02:00 (CEST)
- Postal codes: 54570
- Dialling codes: 06595
- Vehicle registration: DAU
- Website: www.kirchweiler.de

Kirchweiler is an Ortsgemeinde – a municipality belonging to a Verbandsgemeinde, a kind of collective municipality – in the Vulkaneifel district in Rhineland-Palatinate, Germany. It belongs to the Verbandsgemeinde of Daun, whose seat is in the like-named town.

== Geography ==
The municipality lies in the Vulkaneifel, a part of the Eifel known for its volcanic history, geographical and geological features, and even ongoing activity today, including gases that sometimes well up from the earth.

Kirchweiler lies west of the Scharteberg with its Eifel Transmitter at an elevation of 540 m above sea level. Its area is 6.31 km².

== History ==
In 1201, Kirchweiler had its first documentary mention when a nobleman from Berlingen, then held by Himmerod Abbey, bequeathed an estate near Kirchweiler. As of 1398, the undisputed overlord was the Electorate of Trier. In 1600, sixteen hearths (that is, households) were registered in the village, whose ownership had since passed to the Lordship of Daun and then to that of Kesselburg. The number fell in the wake of the Plague and the Thirty Years' War until in 1654, there were only six households left. In 1684, this had already risen back up to ten households, suggesting a population figure of roughly 50. At this time, the villagers in Kirchweiler earned their livelihood mainly through agriculture. In 1624, 11 of the 13 households worked in this field. As for the other two households, there were a craftsman and one villager who had no occupation. The population kept growing on into the 19th century. Kirchweiler passed to the Kingdom of Prussia in 1815. In 1862, there were 376 people living in Kirchweiler. Since 1947, it has been part of the then newly founded state of Rhineland-Palatinate.

== Politics ==
=== Municipal council ===
The council is made up of 7 council members, who were elected at the municipal election held on 7 June 2009, and the honorary mayor as chairman.

=== Mayor ===
Kirchweiler’s mayor is Reiner Berlingen.

=== Coat of arms ===
The German blazon reads: In Grün auf einen silbernen Dreiberg, darin zwei schräg gekreuzte, aufrechte rote Schüssel, ein silbernes Hochkreuz auf einer silbernen Basaltkuppe zu sehen.

The municipality’s arms might in English heraldic language be described thus: Vert, in base a mount argent charged with two keys per saltire, the wards to chief, gules, on the mount a Latin cross on a basalt knoll of the second.

The “mount” is described in the German blazon as a Dreiberg, but it does not have the shape that this charge usually takes in German heraldry (for examples within this same district, see Kerpen’s and Birgel’s coats of arms).

The keys symbolize the parish’s patron saint, Saint Peter, and the cross on the knoll is the old Plague Cross in the village.

== Culture and sightseeing ==
Buildings:

- Saint Peter’s Catholic Parish Church (Pfarrkirche St. Peter), Hauptstraße 31, 1810, west tower 1821, possibly lengthened in the 20th century, in the churchyard post-Baroque shaft cross from about 1810.
- Near Dauner Straße 9 – wayside cross, basalt beam cross, possibly 18th century.
- Gerolsteiner Straße 6 – Quereinhaus (a combination residential and commercial house divided for these two purposes down the middle, perpendicularly to the street), from 1821, partly sided, possibly partly timber-frame from the 18th century, oven porch.
- Gerolsteiner Straße 9 – Quereinhaus from 1842.
- Hauptstraße 17 a – former Quereinhaus from 1834.
- Schulstraße 1 – former school, Reform architecture, from 1910/1920.
- So-called Schwarzes Kreuz (“Black Cross”), south of the village on the road to Neroth, basalt beam cross from 1728.
- Wayside cross, east of the village on the road from Hinterweiler to Steinborn, basalt beam cross from 178(?; last digit unclear).
