= Meisburg =

- Municipality
- Coat of arms

- Location of Meisburg within Vulkaneifel district
- Interactive map of Meisburg
- Location within Germany Location within Rhineland-Palatinate
- Coordinates: 50°06′38″N 6°41′32″E
- Country: Germany
- State: Rhineland-Palatinate
- District: Vulkaneifel
- Municipal assoc.: Daun

Government
  - Mayor (2019–24): Anja Rieker

Area
  - Total: 7.05 km^{2} (2.72 sq mi)
- Elevation: 475 m (1,558 ft)

Population (2025-12-31)
  - Total: 232
  - Density: 32.9/km^{2} (85.2/sq mi)
- Time zone: UTC+01:00 (CET)
  - Summer (DST): UTC+02:00 (CEST)
- Postal codes: 54570
- Dialling codes: 06599
- Vehicle registration: DAU
- Website: www.meisburg.de

Meisburg (in Eifel dialect: Mesbuasch) is an Ortsgemeinde – a municipality belonging to a Verbandsgemeinde, a kind of collective municipality – in the Vulkaneifel district in Rhineland-Palatinate, Germany. It belongs to the Verbandsgemeinde of Daun, whose seat is in the like-named town. In Meisburg, a Moselle Franconian dialect is spoken.

== Geography ==
=== Location ===
The municipality lies on Bundesstraße 257 between Daun (19 km) and Bitburg (24 km) in the middle of the Vulkaneifel, a part of the Eifel known for its volcanic history, geographical and geological features, and even ongoing activity today, including gases that sometimes well up from the earth.

The German Volcano Route, which opened in September 2006, runs past the village.

The village sits in the valley of the Dümpelbach at a mean elevation of 480 m above sea level. The highest elevations in the area are the Daxelberg at 589 m above sea level and Rackenbach at 522 m above sea level. The Schafbach, which empties into the Lohsalm, rises in the Salmwald (forest), a water-rich area with a waterworks. From here, great parts of the Bernkastel-Wittlich district are supplied with drinking water.

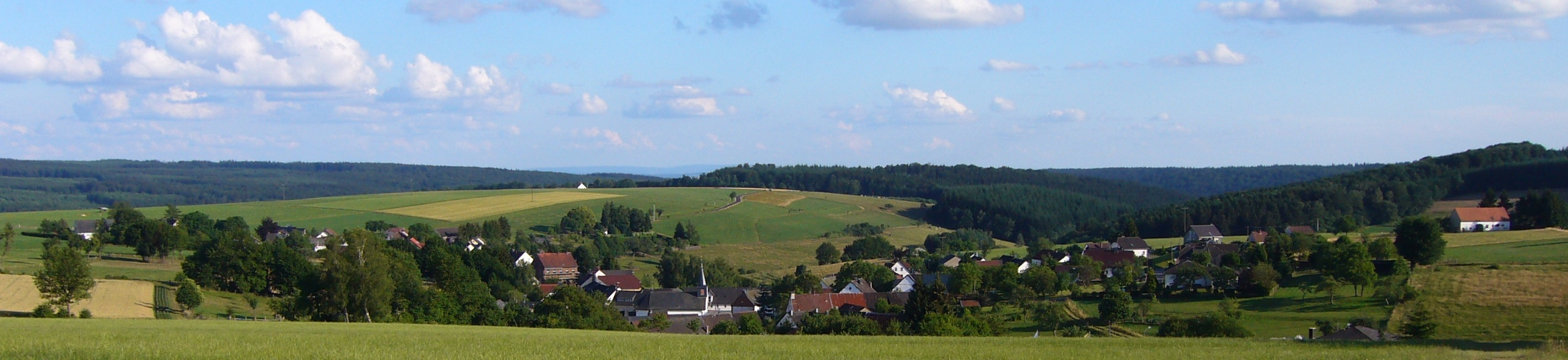
Meisburg from the north

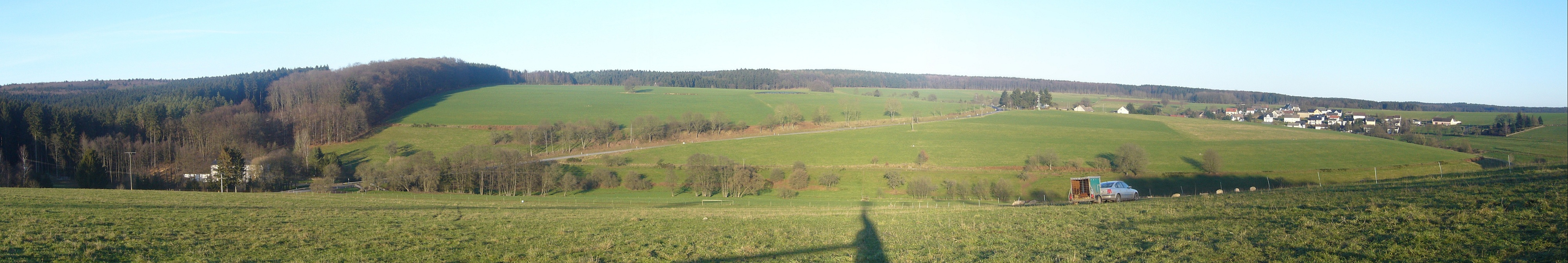
Meisburg from the south

=== Neighbouring municipalities ===
All the following are Meisburg’s immediate neighbours:

- Densborn
- Deudesfeld
- Oberkail
- Salm
- Schutz
- Wallenborn
- Weidenbach

== History ==
The Eifel’s settlement history gives clues as to when the village of Meisburg might have arisen. Finds from the New Stone Age from about 4500 to 1800 BC and clues to Roman settlement about AD 300 in what is now Meisburg’s municipal area bear witness to human habitation here quite early on. The municipality owns a collection of Stone-Age stone hatchets, blades, scraping tools and arrowheads.

Following the Celts were the Romans. The Roman road known as the Weinstraße (“Wine Road”) also came through the Meisburg area, running from Kirn in the Hunsrück by way of Wittlich, and then on the Rackenbacher Wies’chen (a “little meadow”) past nearby Meisburg to Prüm and Malmedy. The Rheinisches Landesmuseum Trier has confirmed an ancient settlement in the rural cadastral area “In der Delt” from the 2nd and 3rd centuries, presumably a Roman farm.

The Romans were driven out by Germanic tribes, and later in the course of the Migration Period came the Franks. In Meisburg, a Moselle Franconian dialect is still spoken today.

Although the municipality marked 750 years of existence in 1979, but it is quite a bit older than that. Meisburg was first mentioned (as “Meisbreth”) in a document of Pope Innocent II in 1140 as property of the abbey Saint Maximin in Trier. The village probably existed around 1116, when the monks of Saint Maximin forged several charters, wherein Meisburg is mentioned as “Meisbrath”.

In 1229, Theoderich and his wife Clarissa, the Lord and Lady of Bruch, donated the patronage and two shares of the tithes at Meisburg to Saint Thomas’s Monastery. In 1330, a church was already listed in the village and Meisburg belonged to the Electoral-Trier Amt of Kyllburg. Saint Thomas’s Monastery was in the centuries that followed Meisburg’s landholder.

When an end was put to the monastery’s landholding rights in 1794, the Amt of Kyllburg also ceased to be in force as the lands on the Rhine’s left bank were annexed by France. Under Napoleonic rule, Meisburg belonged to the Department of Sarre, and more locally to the canton of Prüm. At the Congress of Vienna in 1814 and 1815, this area was assigned to Prussia. The district of Daun was formed and Meisburg belonged to the Bürgermeisterei (“Mayoralty”) of Weidenbach, later being reassigned to the Bürgermeisterei of Niederstadtfeld. Since 1947, it has been part of the then newly founded state of Rhineland-Palatinate, and the former administration in Niederstadtfeld was absorbed into the Verbandsgemeinde of Daun.

The centralized water supply came to the village in 1920, and electricity in 1924. The provincial road, now known as Bundesstraße 257, between Daun and Kyllburg was built in the 1930s.

There is one ghost village near Meisburg, named Rackenbach, and there is also a vanished village, which was called Bradscheid.

As early as 1522, a mill was mentioned. The sawmill on the river Lohsalm is the only working, water-driven sawmill left in the Rhineland. About 2 km up the dale, the remnants of a further mill together with a millrace may still be found.

The Schafbrück, today a hotel, already existed in the 19th century. In the early 1950s, three outlying farms were established at Rackenbach and three more at Rascheid; all are still going concerns.

A school was first mentioned in Meisburg in 1721. This was closed in the course of school reform in 1978. The Wallenborn primary school and the Niederstadtfeld Hauptschule are now the schools for the municipality. A Gymnasium and a Realschule are to be found in Daun and Gerolstein. The former school building in Meisburg now houses the kindergarten for Deudesfeld, Meisburg, Wallenborn and Weidenbach.

== Politics ==
=== Municipal council ===
The council is made up of 6 council members, who were elected at the municipal election held on 7 June 2009, and the honorary mayor as chairman.

=== Mayor ===
Meisburg’s mayor is Anja Rieker.

=== Coat of arms ===
The German blazon reads: Von silber über schwarz geteilt, oben das kurtrierische Kreuz, unten ein rot-silber geschachtelter Schrägrechtsbalken.

The municipality’s arms might in English heraldic language be described thus: Per fess argent a cross gules and sable a bend countercompony of the first and second.

The cross above the line of partition is Electoral Trier’s old armorial bearing and represents Meisburg’s allegiance to Trier in feudal times. The bend countercompony (that is, slanted stripe chequered in two rows) is the charge borne by the Cistercians. This stands for the village’s former landholder, Saint Thomas’s Monastery, which held Meisburg from 1229 to 1794.

=== Town partnerships ===
Meisburg fosters partnerships with the following places:

- Schoppen, Liège, Belgium since 1967.

Schoppen is a village within the municipality of Amel (or Amblève in French), and it lies in Belgium’s eastern German-speaking region.

== Culture and sightseeing ==
Meisburg has an old sawmill, which is driven by an overshot waterwheel seven metres in diameter. The Schneidemühle (“cutting mill”), as it is known locally, is the Rhineland’s, and the Eifel’s, last preserved sawmill. The energy needed to drive it is afforded by a 350 m-long millpond.

Notable structures in Meisburg include the following:

- Saint Bartholomew’s Catholic Parish Church (Pfarrkirche St. Bartholomäus), Kirchstraße 4, aisleless church from 1768, expanded in 1853.
- Auf dem Zuckerberg 2 – house, possibly later divided, from 1791, adjoining commercial building.
- Desserather Straße 1 – former rectory, stately building with roof with half-hipped gables, about 1800.
- Desserather Straße 3 – corner estate, house from 1810, stable-barn.
- Im Dümpel 8 – three-floor, five-axis Quereinhaus (a combination residential and commercial house divided for these two purposes down the middle, perpendicularly to the street), from 1850, expanded into estate along the street, two stable-barns, one from 1887, pump well.
- Kyllburger Straße 4 – house, possibly later divided, from 1791, adjoining commercial building.
- Sawmill, south of the village on the Lohsalm, former mill building, possibly from the 19th century.
- Wayside cross, south of the village on the road to Rascheid, red sandstone niche cross, from 1587, finial cross new.
- Wayside cross, northeast of the village near the sporting ground, shaft cross from 1774.
- Wayside cross, north of the village on a farm lane, red sandstone shaft cross from 1774.

== Economy and infrastructure ==
A significant portion of the local economy derives from the local American Spangdahlem Air Base.
