= Utzerath =

- Municipality
- Coat of arms

- Location of Utzerath within Vulkaneifel district
- Interactive map of Utzerath
- Location within Germany Location within Rhineland-Palatinate
- Coordinates: 50°13′26″N 6°56′15″E
- Country: Germany
- State: Rhineland-Palatinate
- District: Vulkaneifel
- Municipal assoc.: Daun

Government
  - Mayor (2019–24): Erhard Annen

Area
  - Total: 5.70 km^{2} (2.20 sq mi)
- Elevation: 425 m (1,394 ft)

Population (2025-12-31)
  - Total: 177
  - Density: 31.1/km^{2} (80.4/sq mi)
- Time zone: UTC+01:00 (CET)
  - Summer (DST): UTC+02:00 (CEST)
- Postal codes: 54552
- Dialling codes: 02676
- Vehicle registration: DAU
- Website: www.utzerath-eifel.de

Utzerath is an Ortsgemeinde – a municipality belonging to a Verbandsgemeinde, a kind of collective municipality – in the Vulkaneifel district in Rhineland-Palatinate, Germany. It belongs to the Verbandsgemeinde of Daun, whose seat is in the like-named town. The municipality is a state-recognized tourism community (Fremdenverkehrsgemeinde).

== Geography ==
The municipality lies in the Vulkaneifel, a part of the Eifel known for its volcanic history, geographical and geological features, and even ongoing activity today, including gases that sometimes well up from the earth.

== History ==
In 1518, the municipality was still called Otzenrode. The ending —rode makes it clear that the village arose from a clearing in the woods (roden means “clear” in German, in the context of felling woodland). The local scenery today, still heavily wooded, makes this easy to imagine.

The name Utzerath was first used in the 18th century, although it was first spelt Outzenrath.

== Politics ==
=== Municipal council ===
The council is made up of 6 council members, who were elected by majority vote at the municipal election held on 7 June 2009, and the honorary mayor as chairman.

=== Mayor ===
Utzerath's mayor is Erhard Annen, and his deputy is Werner Petry.

=== Coat of arms ===
The German blazon reads: Schildhaupt von oben links, nach unten schrägrechts hälftig geteilt. Im rechten silbernen Schildteil ein Antoniuskreuz mit Pilger-Glöckchen in rot, im linken grünen Schildteil eine silberne Axt und ein silbernes Eichenblatt.

The municipality's arms might in English heraldic language be described thus: Per bend sinister argent a cross tau with a bell hanging from each arm gules and vert an axe bendwise sinister, the edge to sinister, below which an oakleaf bendwise sinister of the first.

The charges on the sinister (armsbearer's left, viewer's right) side, the axe and the oakleaf, refer to Utzerath's beginnings as a clearing in the woods. The tau cross, shown here with pilgrims’ bells, is Saint Anthony's attribute, thus representing the municipality's and the church's patron saint.

== Culture and sightseeing ==
=== Buildings ===
- Saint Anthony's Catholic Church (branch church; Filialkirche St. Antonius), Schönbacher Straße 1 – aisleless church from 1849, expanded in the 20th century.
- Darscheider Straße 6 – timber-frame house, 18th century, panel door, 19th century.
- Darscheider Straße 11/13 – divided house, no. 11 sided, no. 13 decorative timber framing, 18th century.
- Former railway station, north of the village near the municipal limit – plastered station building from about 1900 or 1910.
- Wayside cross, northwest of the village, basalt beam cross from 1677.
- Wayside cross, southwest of the village at the edge of the woods basalt beam cross from 1805.
