= Mückeln =

- Municipality
- Location of Mückeln within Vulkaneifel district
- Interactive map of Mückeln
- Location within Germany Location within Rhineland-Palatinate
- Coordinates: 50°05′13″N 6°55′26″E
- Country: Germany
- State: Rhineland-Palatinate
- District: Vulkaneifel
- Municipal assoc.: Daun

Government
  - Mayor (2019–24): Erwin Steffes

Area
  - Total: 4.73 km^{2} (1.83 sq mi)
- Elevation: 400 m (1,300 ft)

Population (2025-12-31)
  - Total: 221
  - Density: 46.7/km^{2} (121/sq mi)
- Time zone: UTC+01:00 (CET)
  - Summer (DST): UTC+02:00 (CEST)
- Postal codes: 54558
- Dialling codes: 06574
- Vehicle registration: DAU
- Website: www.mueckeln.de

Mückeln is an Ortsgemeinde – a municipality belonging to a Verbandsgemeinde, a kind of collective municipality – in the Vulkaneifel district in Rhineland-Palatinate, Germany. It belongs to the Verbandsgemeinde of Daun, whose seat is in the like-named town.

== Geography ==
Mückeln lies in the south of the Vulkaneifel, a part of the Eifel known for its volcanic history, geographical and geological features, and even ongoing activity today, including gases that sometimes well up from the earth. The municipality borders on the Bernkastel-Wittlich district.

== History ==
In 1336, Mückeln had its first documentary mention in connection with the sale of a piece of land. The village was utterly destroyed in 1678 by French troops. It was once again occupied by the French beginning in 1794, and in 1815 it passed to the Kingdom of Prussia. In 1944, Father Michael Demuth managed to forestall a further destruction of the village by persuading soldiers from a German anti-aircraft gun emplacement to surrender. Since 1947, Mückeln has been part of the then newly founded state of Rhineland-Palatinate. In 1974, Mückeln placed fourth nationally in the contest Unser Dorf soll schöner werden (“Our village should become lovelier”).

== Politics ==
=== Municipal council ===
The council is made up of 6 council members, who were elected at the municipal election held on 7 June 2009, and the honorary mayor as chairman.

=== Mayor ===
Mückeln’s mayor is Erwin Steffes, and his deputy is Peter Sartoris.

== Culture and sightseeing ==
=== Clubs ===
- Men’s singing club
- Music club
- Historische Bühne (“Historical Stage”)

=== Sightseeing ===
- Church from 1954
- Voit organ
