= Vulkaneifel =

Coordinates: 50°15′N 6°45′E

Landkreis Vulkaneifel
- District
- Flag Coat of arms
- Country: Germany
- State: Rhineland-Palatinate
- Capital: Daun

Government
  - District admin.: Julia Gieseking (SPD)

Area
  - Total: 911.01 km^{2} (351.74 sq mi)

Population (31 December 2024)
  - Total: 61,912
  - Density: 67.960/km^{2} (176.01/sq mi)
- Time zone: UTC+01:00 (CET)
  - Summer (DST): UTC+02:00 (CEST)
- Vehicle registration: DAU
- Website: vulkaneifel.de

Vulkaneifel (German pronunciation: [vʊlˈkaːnʔaɪfl̩]) is a district (Kreis) in the northwest of the state Rhineland-Palatinate, Germany. It is the least densely populated district in the state and the fourth most sparsely populated district in Germany. The administrative centre of the district is in Daun. Neighboring districts are Euskirchen (North Rhine-Westphalia), Ahrweiler, Mayen-Koblenz, Cochem-Zell, Bernkastel-Wittlich, and Bitburg-Prüm.

== Location ==
The county of Vulkaneifel lies in the western part of the eponymous region which lies at heights between 150 and 700 metres above sea level. As a result of former volcanism, numerous mineral springs (Sauerbrunnen) have formed. The Kyll flows through the county from north to south. The German Wildlife Route and the German Volcano Route also cross the county as does the Eifelsteig hiking trail.

== History ==
The district was created in 1815 when the Eifel became part of Prussia. As most of the local industries had their traditional markets in France, the district fell into a severe economic crisis. The construction of a railroad in the second half of the 19th century helped it to recover. The construction of the Nürburgring in 1927 was also an infrastructural project that helped the local economy. The district was enlarged significantly in 1970–1971, when the districts Mayen and Prüm were dissolved and parts were added to the Daun district.

On January 1, 2007, the district Daun was renamed Vulkaneifel, the name of the landscape.

== Geography ==
The district is located in the Eifel mountains, containing volcanic lakes called maars. The largest river in the district is the Kyll.

The Vulkaneifel consists of three regions: Vulkanische Osteifel (municipalities of Brohltal, Vordereifel, Mendig, Pellenz), Vulkanische Hocheifel (municipalities of Kelberg, Ulmen, and the village of Nohn), and Vulkanische Westeifel (remainder of the municipality of Hillesheim, and municipalities Obere Kyll, Gerolstein, Manderscheid, Daun).

== Tourism ==
Places of interest in the Vulkaneifel include the maar lakes around Daun, and Manderscheid, as well as the caldera lake of Laacher See at the abbey of Maria Laach, which is the largest, and the youngest within the region. Hiking and cycling trails dot the region.

Museums in the Vulkaneifel include the Lava-Dome (the German volcanic museum) in Mendig, the Vulkanhaus in Strohn, and the Eifel-Vulkanmuseum in Daun.

The Vulkaneifel contains three geological parks (2004,45 km^{2}), the Vulkanpark Brohltal/Laacher See, the Vulkanpark Osteifel, and the Vulkaneifel European Geopark.

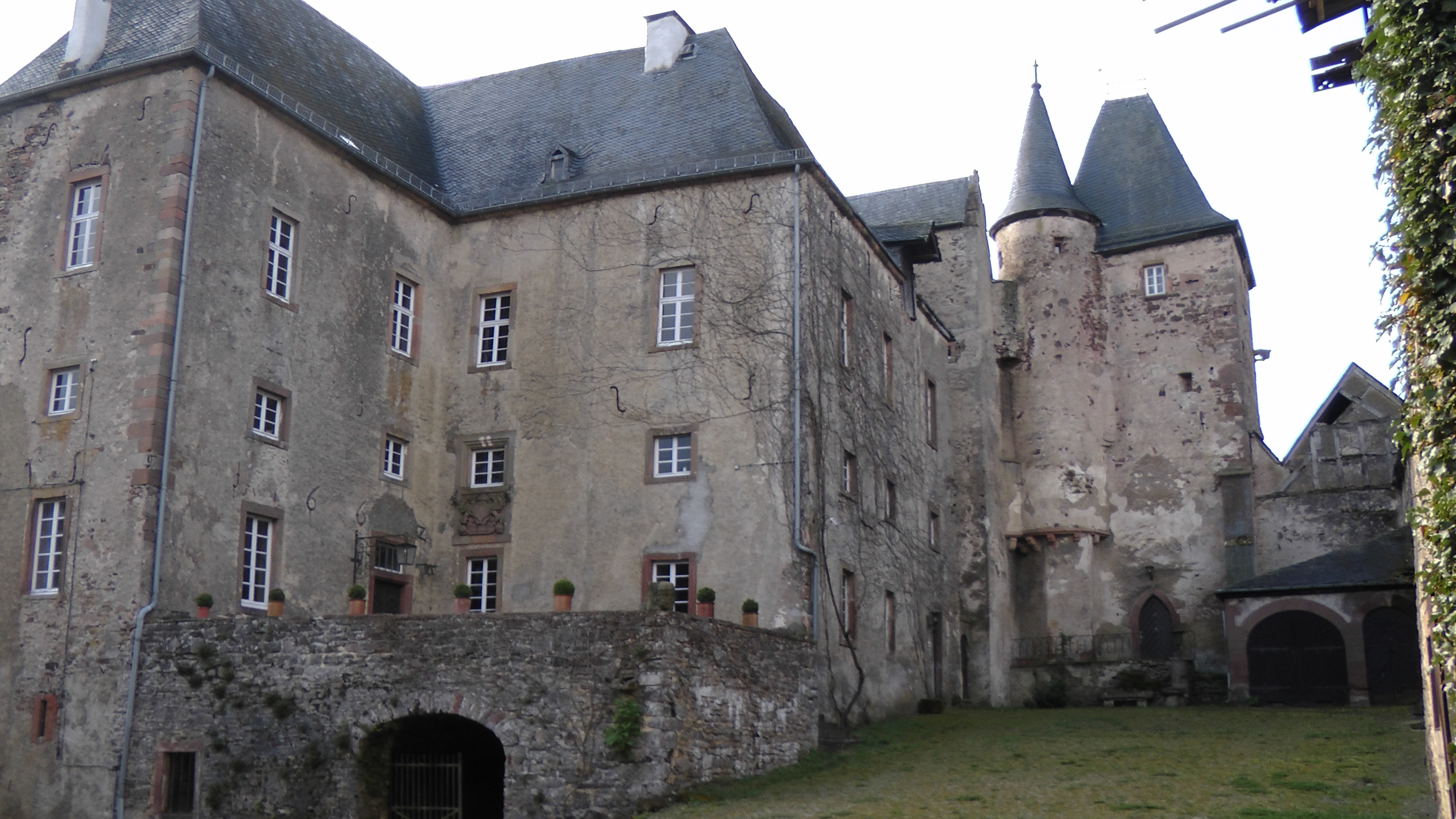
Courtyard of the Castle of Lissingen

The Castle of Eltz and the Castle of Lissingen are well preserved castles in the Vulkaneifel.

== Coat of arms ==
The coat of arms show the symbols of three territories which historically made up the district. In the left is the cross of Trier, the lion in the right represents the Counts of Blankenheim-Gerolstein. The escutcheon in the middle show the arms of the Counts of Daun.

== Towns and municipalities ==

Verbandsgemeinden
1. Daun; 1. Betteldorf; 2. Bleckhausen; 3. Brockscheid; 4. Darscheid; 5. Daun^{1, 2}; 6. Demerath; 7. Deudesfeld; 8. Dockweiler; 9. Dreis-Brück; 10. Ellscheid; 11. Gefell; 12. Gillenfeld; 13. Hinterweiler; 14. Hörscheid; 15. Immerath; 16. Kirchweiler; 17. Kradenbach; 18. Mehren; 19. Meisburg; 20. Mückeln; 21. Nerdlen; 22. Niederstadtfeld; 23. Oberstadtfeld; 24. Sarmersbach; 25. Saxler; 26. Schalkenmehren; 27. Schönbach; 28. Schutz; 29. Steineberg; 30. Steiningen; 31. Strohn; 32. Strotzbüsch; 33. Udler; 34. Üdersdorf; 35. Utzerath; 36. Wallenborn; 37. Weidenbach; 38. Winkel	2. Gerolstein; 1. Basberg; 2. Berlingen; 3. Berndorf; 4. Birgel; 5. Birresborn; 6. Densborn; 7. Dohm-Lammersdorf; 8. Duppach; 9. Esch; 10. Feusdorf; 11. Gerolstein^{1, 2}; 12. Gönnersdorf; 13. Hallschlag; 14. Hillesheim; 15. Hohenfels-Essingen; 16. Jünkerath; 17. Kalenborn-Scheuern; 18. Kerpen; 19. Kerschenbach; 20. Kopp; 21. Lissendorf; 22. Mürlenbach; 23. Neroth; 24. Nohn; 25. Oberbettingen; 26. Oberehe-Stroheich; 27. Ormont; 28. Pelm; 29. Reuth; 30. Rockeskyll; 31. Salm; 32. Scheid; 33. Schüller; 34. Stadtkyll; 35. Steffeln; 36. Üxheim; 37. Walsdorf; 38. Wiesbaum	3. Kelberg; 1. Arbach; 2. Beinhausen; 3. Bereborn; 4. Berenbach; 5. Bodenbach; 6. Bongard; 7. Borler; 8. Boxberg; 9. Brücktal; 10. Drees; 11. Gelenberg; 12. Gunderath; 13. Höchstberg; 14. Horperath; 15. Hörschhausen; 16. Kaperich; 17. Katzwinkel; 18. Kelberg^{1}; 19. Kirsbach; 20. Kolverath; 21. Kötterichen; 22. Lirstal; 23. Mannebach; 24. Mosbruch; 25. Neichen; 26. Nitz; 27. Oberelz; 28. Reimerath; 29. Retterath; 30. Sassen; 31. Uersfeld; 32. Ueß; 33. Welcherath
^{1}seat of the Verbandsgemeinde; ^{2}town

== Transport links ==
Verkehrsverbund Region Trier (VRT)

There are two railway lines partly located in the Vulkaneifel district, the Eifel Railway (Hürth-Kalscheuren - Trier-Ehrang), in service for passenger and fright transport as well as the Cross Eifel Railway (Andernach - Mayen - Kaisersesch - Ulmen - Daun - Gerolstein), the section from Kaisersesch to Gerolstein, is out of service.

The district is located in the area of the transport association Verkehrsverbund Region Trier (VRT).
