= Nerdlen =

- Municipality
- Coat of arms

- Location of Nerdlen within Vulkaneifel district
- Interactive map of Nerdlen
- Location within Germany Location within Rhineland-Palatinate
- Coordinates: 50°14′09″N 6°51′35″E
- Country: Germany
- State: Rhineland-Palatinate
- District: Vulkaneifel
- Municipal assoc.: Daun

Government
  - Mayor (2019–24): Wolfgang Maas

Area
  - Total: 4.45 km^{2} (1.72 sq mi)
- Elevation: 430 m (1,410 ft)

Population (2025-12-31)
  - Total: 262
  - Density: 58.9/km^{2} (152/sq mi)
- Time zone: UTC+01:00 (CET)
  - Summer (DST): UTC+02:00 (CEST)
- Postal codes: 54552
- Dialling codes: 06592
- Vehicle registration: DAU
- Website: www.nerdlen.de

Nerdlen is an Ortsgemeinde – a municipality belonging to a Verbandsgemeinde, a kind of collective municipality – in the Vulkaneifel district in Rhineland-Palatinate, Germany. It belongs to the Verbandsgemeinde of Daun, whose seat is in the like-named town.

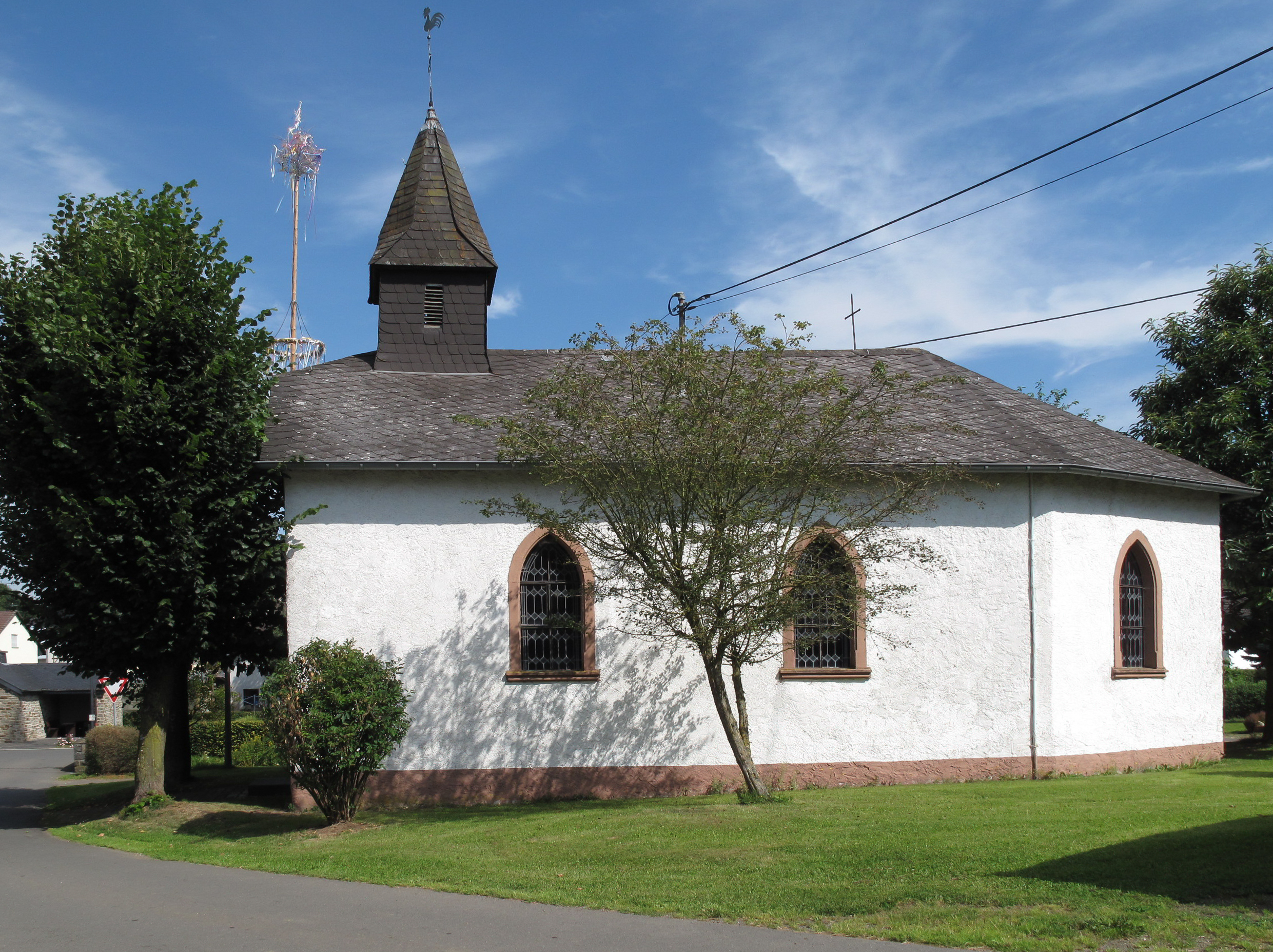
Nerdlen, Kirche

== Geography ==
The municipality lies in the Vulkaneifel, a part of the Eifel known for its volcanic history, geographical and geological features, and even ongoing activity today, including gases that sometimes well up from the earth.

Nerdlen lies in the Lieser valley between Daun and Kelberg roughly 5 km from Daun town centre. The small village lies among woodland, meadows and fields.

== History ==
About 1000, Nerdlen had its first documentary mention.

The municipality's name was originally Zu den Erlen (“At the Alders”). Through faulty separation of the last two words, this later became Nerlen, and then eventually Nerdlen.

== Politics ==
=== Municipal council ===
The council is made up of 6 council members, who were elected at the municipal election held on 7 June 2009, and the honorary mayor as chairman.

=== Mayor ===
Nerdlen’s mayor is Wolfgang Maas.

=== Coat of arms ===
The German blazon reads: Von Silber über Rot geteilt, oben ein grüner Erlenzweig mit drei Blättern, unten ein halbes silbernes Rad.

The municipality’s arms might in English heraldic language be described thus: Per fess argent an alder sprig leafed of three and gules a demi-wheel of the first.

The alder sprig is a canting charge, suggesting the municipality’s name, which is indeed derived from the German word for “alder”. As mentioned above, the name is a corruption of the phrase Zu den Erlen. The half-wheel below the line of partition is – in its whole form – Saint Catherine’s attribute, thus representing the chapel’s patron saint.

== Culture and sightseeing ==
Buildings:

- Catholic branch church, An der Hohl 2, biaxial aisleless church, late 19th century or about 1900.
- Hauptstraße/corner of An der Hohl – warriors’ memorial, 1914-1918.
