= Steiningen =

- Municipality
- Coat of arms

- Location of Steiningen within Vulkaneifel district
- Interactive map of Steiningen
- Location within Germany Location within Rhineland-Palatinate
- Coordinates: 50°11′9.38″N 6°54′48.34″E
- Country: Germany
- State: Rhineland-Palatinate
- District: Vulkaneifel
- Municipal assoc.: Daun

Government
  - Mayor (2019–24): Reinhold Schäfer

Area
  - Total: 7.60 km^{2} (2.93 sq mi)
- Elevation: 450 m (1,480 ft)

Population (2025-12-31)
  - Total: 196
  - Density: 25.8/km^{2} (66.8/sq mi)
- Time zone: UTC+01:00 (CET)
  - Summer (DST): UTC+02:00 (CEST)
- Postal codes: 54552
- Dialling codes: 06573
- Vehicle registration: DAU
- Website: www.steiningen.de

Steiningen is an Ortsgemeinde – a municipality belonging to a Verbandsgemeinde, a kind of collective municipality – in the Vulkaneifel district in Rhineland-Palatinate, Germany. It belongs to the Verbandsgemeinde of Daun, whose seat is in the like-named town.

== Geography ==
The municipality lies in the Vulkaneifel, a part of the Eifel known for its volcanic history, geographical and geological features, and even ongoing activity today, including gases that sometimes well up from the earth.

The vanished village of Allscheid lay northwest of Steiningen at an elevation of 475 m above sea level.

== History ==
On 28 August 1193, Steiningen had its first documentary mention in a document signed by Emperor Heinrich VI in Boppard. The document itself dealt with a confirmation of ownership for Springiersbach Abbey, and it names Steiningen explicitly. In 1136 and 1150, great landholdings were transferred to Springiersbach Abbey. Since all secular land belonged to the Emperor, any transfer of ownership had to have its rightfulness thus confirmed. In 1144, King Conrad III had done this with Springiersbach, making it necessary for Heinrich VI to confirm the transfer to Sprenkirsbach (Springiersbach) Abbey after he took the throne in 1190.

The document comes from the Koblenz Main State Archive (Landeshauptarchiv Koblenz), and the original parchment on which it is written measures 40 × 40 cm. It says in the text: In Steguenam curtem unam (“In Steiningen [we own] an estate”)

It is clear from this document that Steiningen was one of Springiersbach Abbey's holdings. This is also proved by two Steiningen municipal borderstones that were still on hand as recently as the mid 20th century, upon which the inscription “Sp.W”, for Springiersbacher Wald (Wald means “forest”) was chiselled. Two of these stones were used to build the back staircase at the old school, but when new building work was done in 1952, they were walled up along with the staircase, despite pleas from schoolteacher Adolf Molitor.

The manor house belonging to Springiersbach Abbey, which was mentioned in the 1193 document, has completely disappeared; only a waterpipe that was unearthed by ploughing in the 1920s, leading to the estate, is still preserved.

== Politics ==
=== Municipal council ===
The council is made up of 6 council members, who were elected by majority vote at the municipal election held on 7 June 2009, and the honorary mayor as chairman.

=== Mayor ===
Steiningen's mayor is Reinhold Schäfer, and his deputies are Horst Michels and Hermann Häb.

=== Coat of arms ===
The German blazon reads: In Grün durch silbernen, schräglinken Wellenbalken geteilt; vorne eine silberne Kapelle, hinten ein silbernes Hufeisen, begleitet von zwei silbernen, fünfstrahligen Sternen.

The municipality's arms might in English heraldic language be described thus: Vert a bend sinister wavy, dexter a chapel, sinister a horseshoe between two mullets of five all in bend sinister, all argent.

The chapel on the dexter (armsbearer's right, viewer's left) side refers to the one still standing today not far from Steiningen, where once stood the small village of Allscheid, whose inhabitants forsook their homes in 1852 and emigrated to the United States. The bend sinister wavy (the slanted stripe) symbolizes the Altbach, which lends character to the local scenery. The horseshoe and the two mullets of five (star shapes) stand for the municipality's patron saint, Saint Maurice, who is also patron saint of horses. These charges also refer to the custom, traceable to 1749, of the horse blessing.

== Culture and sightseeing ==
=== Buildings ===
- Saint Maurice’s Catholic Church (branch church; Filialkirche St. Mauritius), Hauptstraße 7 – biaxial aisleless church from 1876.
- Hauptstraße 12 – timber-frame house, partly solid, 18th century.
- Heiligenhäuschen (a small, shrinelike structure consecrated to a saint or saints), northeast of the village on the road to Ulmen – enclosed wall block with segmental arches, 18th/19th century.
- Chapel, northwest of the village on the road to Darscheid – small plastered building, early 20th century.
