= Strotzbüsch =

- Municipality
- Coat of arms

- Location of Strotzbüsch within Vulkaneifel district
- Interactive map of Strotzbüsch
- Location within Germany Location within Rhineland-Palatinate
- Coordinates: 50°6′37.32″N 6°57′59.9″E
- Country: Germany
- State: Rhineland-Palatinate
- District: Vulkaneifel
- Municipal assoc.: Daun

Government
  - Mayor (2019–24): Dirk Peifer

Area
  - Total: 6.45 km^{2} (2.49 sq mi)
- Elevation: 370 m (1,210 ft)

Population (2025-12-31)
  - Total: 416
  - Density: 64.5/km^{2} (167/sq mi)
- Time zone: UTC+01:00 (CET)
  - Summer (DST): UTC+02:00 (CEST)
- Postal codes: 54552
- Dialling codes: 06573
- Vehicle registration: DAU
- Website: www.strotzbuesch.de

Strotzbüsch is an Ortsgemeinde – a municipality belonging to a Verbandsgemeinde, a kind of collective municipality – in the Vulkaneifel district in Rhineland-Palatinate, Germany. It belongs to the Verbandsgemeinde of Daun, whose seat is in the like-named town.

== Geography ==
The municipality lies in the south of the Vulkaneifel, a part of the Eifel known for its volcanic history, geographical and geological features, and even ongoing activity today, including gases that sometimes well up from the earth.

== History ==
On 11 June 1097, Strotzbüsch had its first documentary mention in a donation document in which Archbishop of Trier Egilbert confirmed the Saint Simeon Monastery's holdings in Strouadesbusch (Strotzbüsch) and Lutzenroda (Lutzerath). The donation itself came from the provost Poppe's holdings. Later, the village was also called Struwertzbusch (1360) and Stroßbusch (1476).

Until 1794, Strotzbüsch belonged to the Electoral-Trier Amt of Cochem. The tithes were shared among the Cathedral Provost of Trier, the Abbey of Echternach and Count Waldbott von Bassenheim.

== Politics ==
=== Municipal council ===
The council is made up of 8 council members, who were elected by majority vote at the municipal election held on 7 June 2009, and the honorary mayor as chairman.

=== Mayor ===
Strotzbüsch's mayor is Dirk Peifer.

=== Coat of arms ===
The German blazon reads: Schild geteilt, oben in Rot eine silberne Waage mit einem silbernen Palmwedel belegt. Unten in Gold ein schwarzer, doppelköpfiger Adler.

The municipality's arms might in English heraldic language be described thus: Per fess gules balances surmounted by a palm frond palewise argent, and Or an eagle bicapitate displayed sable armed and langued of the first.

The balances above the line of partition represent the Strotzbüscher Gericht, the village's former court, documented by a court seal from 1725. This seal shows the municipality's patron saint, Vincent. His attribute is the palm frond, which has been included as a charge in these arms.

The two-headed eagle below the line of partition refers to Strotzbüsch's former obligation to pay one third of its tithes to the Abbey of Echternach.

The arms have been borne since 21 March 1985.

== Culture and sightseeing ==
=== Buildings ===
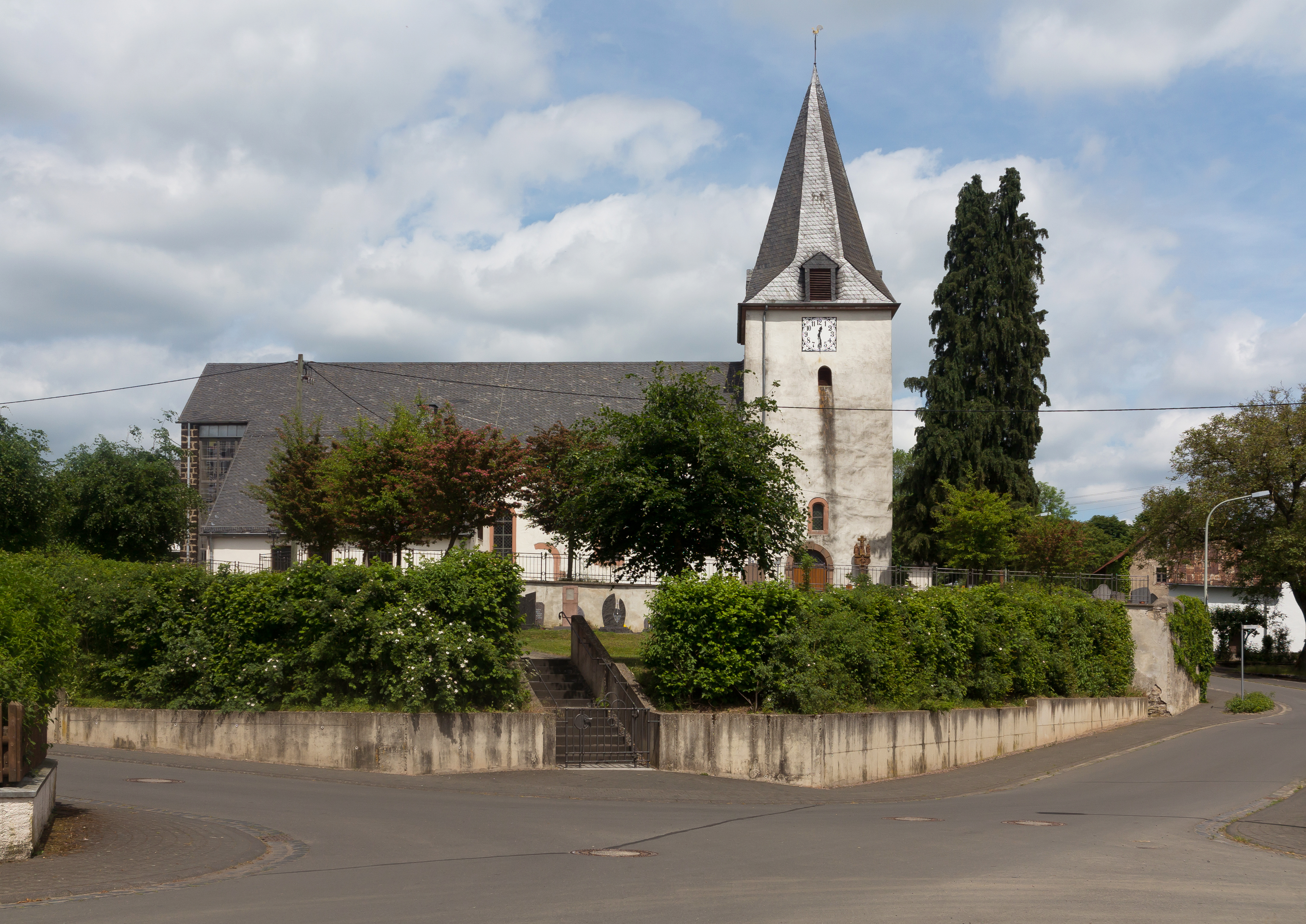
Strotzbüsch, Pfarrkirche Sankt Vinzenzius

- Saint Vincent's Catholic Parish Church (Pfarrkirche St. Vinzenzius), Kirchstraße 12 – late mediaeval quire tower, 15th/16th century, essential late mediaeval, nave renovated in 1722, expanded in 1968; shaft cross used as priest's gravestone, early 19th century; Crucifixion Bildstock, 18th century.
- Hontheimer Straße – wayside chapel, plastered building with timber-frame façade, 19th century.
- Strotzbüscher Mühle – old mill.

=== Natural monuments ===
- Mineral spring
- Siebenbachtal (lookout point from which the Üß can be seen in 7 places)

=== Archaeology ===
- Roman grave

=== Sport and leisure ===
- recreational hiking trails through natural areas
