= Kradenbach =

- Municipality
- Coat of arms

- Location of Kradenbach within Vulkaneifel district
- Interactive map of Kradenbach
- Location within Germany Location within Rhineland-Palatinate
- Coordinates: 50°15′28″N 6°51′15″E
- Country: Germany
- State: Rhineland-Palatinate
- District: Vulkaneifel
- Municipal assoc.: Daun

Government
  - Mayor (2019–24): Klaus Rödder

Area
  - Total: 1.73 km^{2} (0.67 sq mi)
- Elevation: 485 m (1,591 ft)

Population (2025-12-31)
  - Total: 144
  - Density: 83.2/km^{2} (216/sq mi)
- Time zone: UTC+01:00 (CET)
  - Summer (DST): UTC+02:00 (CEST)
- Postal codes: 54552
- Dialling codes: 06592
- Vehicle registration: DAU
- Website: www.kradenbach.de

Kradenbach is an Ortsgemeinde – a municipality belonging to a Verbandsgemeinde, a kind of collective municipality – in the Vulkaneifel district in Rhineland-Palatinate, Germany. It belongs to the Verbandsgemeinde of Daun, whose seat is in the like-named town.

== Geography ==
The municipality lies in the Vulkaneifel, a part of the Eifel known for its volcanic history, geographical and geological features, and even ongoing activity today, including gases that sometimes well up from the earth.

Kradenbach's area is 173 ha, 27 ha of which is wooded. It sits at an elevation of 480 m above sea level.

== History ==
Beginning in 1357, Kradenbach belonged to the Electoral-Trier Amt of Daun. Under Prussian administration, it belonged to the Bürgermeisterei (“Mayoralty”) of Sarmersbach.

== Politics ==
=== Municipal council ===
The council is made up of 6 council members, who were elected by at the municipal election held on 7 June 2009, and the honorary mayor as chairman.

=== Mayor ===
Kradenbach's mayor is Klaus Rödder.

=== Coat of arms ===
The German blazon reads: In Silber; durch einen blauen Wellenstab gespalten; vorne ein rotes Balkenkreuz; hinten drei rote Mitren übereinander.

The municipality's arms might in English heraldic language be described thus: Argent a pallet wavy azure, dexter a cross gules and sinister three mitres in pale of the last.

The blue wavy pallet (narrow vertical stripe) refers at once to the brook that gave the municipality its name and to the placename ending —bach, which means “brook”. The cross on the dexter (armsbearer's right, viewer's left) side is the arms formerly borne by the Electorate of Trier, once the feudal overlord, while the three mitres on the sinister (armsbearer's left, viewer's right) side symbolize Saint Maternus – who headed three different bishoprics in his lifetime (Cologne, Tongeren and Trier) – thus representing the municipality's patron saint.

== Culture and sightseeing ==
Buildings:

- Catholic church, Hauptstraße 12, biaxial aisleless church from 1785.
