= Gefell, Rhineland-Palatinate =

Gefell
- Municipality
- Coat of arms

- Location of Gefell within Vulkaneifel district
- Interactive map of Gefell
- Location within Germany Location within Rhineland-Palatinate
- Coordinates: 50°14′19″N 6°54′40″E
- Country: Germany
- State: Rhineland-Palatinate
- District: Vulkaneifel
- Municipal assoc.: Daun

Government
  - Mayor (2019–24): Alfred Gundert

Area
  - Total: 2.79 km^{2} (1.08 sq mi)
- Elevation: 535 m (1,755 ft)

Population (2025-12-31)
  - Total: 93
  - Density: 33/km^{2} (86/sq mi)
- Time zone: UTC+01:00 (CET)
  - Summer (DST): UTC+02:00 (CEST)
- Postal codes: 54552
- Dialling codes: 02692
- Vehicle registration: DAU
- Website: www.gefell.de

Gefell is an Ortsgemeinde – a municipality belonging to a Verbandsgemeinde, a kind of collective municipality – in the Vulkaneifel district in Rhineland-Palatinate, Germany. It belongs to the Verbandsgemeinde of Daun, whose seat is in the eponymous town.

== Geography ==
=== Location ===
The municipality lies in the Vulkaneifel, a part of the Eifel known for its volcanic history, geographical and geological features, and even ongoing activity today, including gases that sometimes well up from the earth.

== History ==
From 1357, Gefell was secularly under the lordship of the Electorate of Trier, but ecclesiastically it was an affiliate of the Parish of Beinhausen (Hilgerath) within the Archbishopric of Cologne. The village gets its name from the former Electoral-Trier road toll (known in German as a Gefälle or Gevelle).

Gefell had a chapel as early as 1683 that by 1719 was rich in holdings, namely 19 Morgen, 19 Ruten and two Schuh in choice meadowlands, as measured in Trier units (this works out to almost 7 ha). Moreover, it held capital to a total of 439 Gulden while the tithes yielded for each of the chapel and the pastor two Malter of oats. In this same year, the mill (Gefeller Mühle) was still in operation and was paying 3 Albus each year in rent. Five families who were liable to taxation were living in Gefell at the time, who, among other things, also had to pay the Simple tax, levied on assessed net earnings from cropland, newly cleared land, newly burnt land, meadows, forest use, proceeds from livestock and so on. The heads of these five liable families were Johannes Diewald, Heinrich Emmerichs, Peter Haubrichs, Matthias Krein and Matthias Saxler.

Roughly 90% of Gefellers are Roman Catholic and belong to the Catholic parish of St. Hubertus Beinhausen with its parish church at Hilgerath. Once, a walk of several kilometres was obligatory for those who wanted to attend Mass in greater numbers in Hilgerath.

== Politics ==
=== Municipal council ===
The council is made up of 6 council members, who were elected at the municipal election held on 7 June 2009, and the honorary mayor as chairman.

=== Mayor ===
Gefell’s mayor is Alfred Gundert, and his two deputies are Wolfgang Kläs and Bruno Wagner.

=== Coat of arms ===
The German blazon reads: Von Grün und Silber geviert; 1) eine silberne Zange; 2) ein rotes Balkenkreuz; 3) ein schwarzes Balkenkreuz; 4) ein silberner Turm.

The municipality’s arms might in English heraldic language be described thus: Quarterly, first vert a pair of tongs palewise argent, second argent a cross gules, third argent a cross sable and fourth vert a tower embattled of four of the second.

The tongs in the first quarter are Saint Apollonia’s attribute, and thus stand for the saint who is worshipped in the local chapel alongside Saint Barbara, the municipality’s patron saint, whose attribute, the tower, is seen in the fourth quarter. The two crosses symbolize the secular and ecclesiastical authorities that held sway in Gefell in the Middle Ages, the red one standing for the Electorate of Trier and the black one for the Archbishopric of Cologne.

== Culture and sightseeing ==
=== Buildings ===
- Saint Barbara’s Catholic Church (branch church), Dorfstraße 8, small aisleless church from 1850
