= Dockweiler =

- Municipality
- Coat of arms

- Location of Dockweiler within Vulkaneifel district
- Interactive map of Dockweiler
- Location within Germany Location within Rhineland-Palatinate
- Coordinates: 50°15′07″N 6°46′57″E
- Country: Germany
- State: Rhineland-Palatinate
- District: Vulkaneifel
- Municipal assoc.: Daun

Government
  - Mayor (2019–24): Matthias Haas

Area
  - Total: 6.05 km^{2} (2.34 sq mi)
- Elevation: 535 m (1,755 ft)

Population (2025-12-31)
  - Total: 668
  - Density: 110/km^{2} (286/sq mi)
- Time zone: UTC+01:00 (CET)
  - Summer (DST): UTC+02:00 (CEST)
- Postal codes: 54552
- Dialling codes: 06595
- Vehicle registration: DAU
- Website: www.dockweiler-web.de

Dockweiler is an Ortsgemeinde – a municipality belonging to a Verbandsgemeinde, a kind of collective municipality – in the Vulkaneifel district in Rhineland-Palatinate, Germany. It belongs to the Verbandsgemeinde of Daun, whose seat is in the like-named town.

== Geography ==
=== Location ===
The municipality lies on the watershed between the Ahr and the Moselle in the heart of the Vulkaneifel, a part of the Eifel known for its volcanic history, geographical and geological features, and even ongoing activity today, including gases that sometimes well up from the earth. Dockweiler lies in the north of Rhineland-Palatinate at an elevation of roughly 500 to 560 m above sea level between Daun and Gerolstein.

=== Geology ===
A lava flow stretching from the Ernstberg (700 m) and across the Eselsberg (637 m), ending just before the neighbouring village of Dreis, forms the bedrock under Dockweiler.

== History ==
In 1136, Dockweiler had its first documentary mention in the Springiersbach Monastery's directory of holdings. Finds of coins, Roman burial mounds and settlement centres near Dockweiler as well as the proximity to the former Meuse-Rhine and Meuse-Moselle Roman roads are taken as evidence of Dockweiler's founding going as far back as Roman times, although this cannot be confirmed.

Quite early on, the village belonged to the County of Kerpen, which later passed to the County of the Lords of Manderscheid-Schleiden.

In the 19th century, Dockweiler became a postal coach station, until 1895, when postal coaches were replaced by the railway; at this time, the Dockweiler/Dreis railway station also came into being.

== Politics ==
=== Municipal council ===
The council is made up of 12 council members, who were elected by majority vote at the municipal election held on 7 June 2009, and the honorary mayor as chairman.

=== Mayor ===
Dockweiler's mayor is Matthias Haas.

=== Coat of arms ===
The German blazon reads: Unter rotem Schildhaupt, darin ein goldener Zickzackbalken, schräg links von Silber und Rot geteilt; vorn ein schwarzes Rost, hinten eine doppelblättrige, goldene Rose mit rotem Butzen.

The municipality's arms might in English heraldic language be described thus: Per bend sinister argent a gridiron bendwise sinister sable and gules a rose with petals doubled Or seeded of the field, in a chief of the third a bar dancetty of three of the fourth.

The narrow zigzag stripe (“bar dancetty”) stands for the centuries through which the Counts of Manderscheid held sway in Dockweiler. The gridiron is Saint Lawrence’s attribute, and as such symbolizes the church's and the municipality's patron saint. Dockweiler passed as the result of a noble bequest to the Duchy of Arenberg. The Dukes bore a charge of three roses in their arms, and the rose in Dockweiler's arms recalls this time.

== Culture and sightseeing ==
Near the Romanesque church, which was built about 1200, are found limetrees and chestnut trees some 200 years old, which are held to be natural monuments. In the Dockweiler Wald (forest) is an acidic mineral spring. South of the village lies a block lava field, another natural monument.

Hikers can explore the woodlands in the Dockweiler-Daun-Kelberg triangle.

=== Buildings ===
- Saint Lawrence’s Catholic Parish Church, Pfarrer-Hubert-Schmitz-Straße 5, may originally have been an aisleless church in the 11th century, expanded into a basilica towards the end of the 12th century, Romanesque Revival tower and nave expansion in 1903 and 1904, architect L. von Fisenne, Gelsenkirchen.
- Dauner Straße 21 – former railway station, built to standard plans, early 20th century.
- Gerolsteiner Straße 4 – timber-frame house, partly solid.
- Gerolsteiner Straße 5 – Quereinhaus (a combination residential and commercial house divided for these two purposes down the middle, perpendicularly to the street), Classicist motifs, from 1856.
- Hauptstraße 24 – plaster structure (former rectory?), perhaps from mid 19th century.

== Economy and infrastructure ==
=== Transport ===
==== Road ====
Dockweiler is linked to the road network by Bundesstraßen 421 and 410. The municipality is served by two regional bus routes, 500 / 9311 serving the route Gerolstein-Daun-Cochem, and, intermittently, 511 / 9367 running the Jünkerath-Hillesheim-Daun route.

==== Rail ====
After discontinue public local rail transport on Cross Eifel Railway there was a touristic special train service which was running only from May to October to and from the old station on Dauner Straße. Trains ran scheduled daytime services to and from Gerolstein, Daun, Ulmen, Kaisersesch, Mayen and Andernach, but currently also this trains are not in service.
