= German Wildlife Route =

The German Wildlife Route (German: Deutsche Wildstraße) runs through the Eifel mountains.

It was opened on 26 July 1970. Following a 180-kilometre-long circular route from the red deer park in the town of Daun, it runs past various other wildlife conservation parks. It continues via Gerolstein, Birresborn, Neustraßburg, Gondorf, Manderscheid and Gillenfeld before returning to Daun.

The route also goes past the volcanic maars of the Eifel mountains.
