= Deudesfeld =

- Municipality
- Coat of arms

- Location of Deudesfeld within Vulkaneifel district
- Interactive map of Deudesfeld
- Location within Germany Location within Rhineland-Palatinate
- Coordinates: 50°6′14″N 6°43′52″E
- Country: Germany
- State: Rhineland-Palatinate
- District: Vulkaneifel
- Municipal assoc.: Daun

Government
  - Mayor (2019–24): Otmar Eckstein

Area
  - Total: 8.03 km^{2} (3.10 sq mi)
- Elevation: 440 m (1,440 ft)

Population (2025-12-31)
  - Total: 330
  - Density: 41/km^{2} (110/sq mi)
- Time zone: UTC+01:00 (CET)
  - Summer (DST): UTC+02:00 (CEST)
- Postal codes: 54570
- Dialling codes: 06599
- Vehicle registration: DAU
- Website: www.deudesfeld.de

Deudesfeld (in Eifel dialect: Deisseld) is an Ortsgemeinde – a municipality belonging to a Verbandsgemeinde, a kind of collective municipality – in the southwest Vulkaneifel district in Rhineland-Palatinate, Germany. It belongs to the Verbandsgemeinde of Daun, whose seat is in the like-named town. In Deudesfeld, Moselle Franconian is spoken.

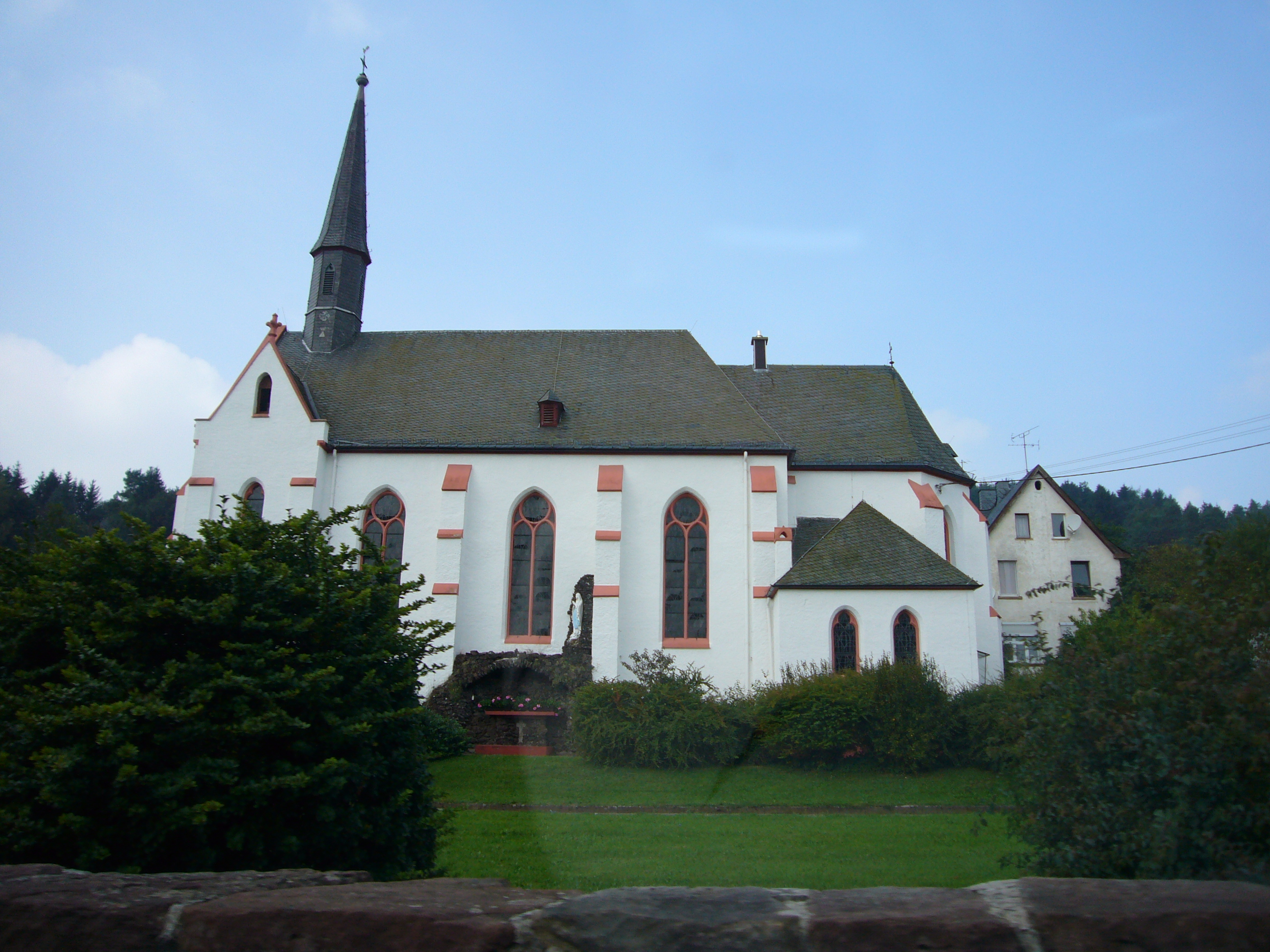
Parish church in Deudesfeld

== Geography ==
=== Location ===
The municipality lies in the Vulkaneifel, a part of the Eifel known for its volcanic history, geographical and geological features, and even ongoing activity today, including gases that sometimes well up from the earth.

=== Constituent communities ===
The municipality is made up of the main centre, likewise called Deudesfeld, and the outlying centre (Ortsteil) of Desserath, as well as the homesteads of Mausensmühle and Turnermühle.

== History ==
Deudesfeld, formerly Dudensvelt, Dudenesfelt or Dudesfeld, gets its name from the Frankish given name Dedin with the placename ending —feld (“field”). The customary dialectal name Deisselt is actually a corruption of the name Desserath (formerly Deissilrod), an outlying centre.

Finds of golden coins, potsherds and bits of tools dating from Roman times have led to the conclusion that there was already a settlement of some kind here as early as the 3rd century. Deudesfeld had its first documentary mention in 1171 when the knight Ludwig von Deudesfeld was mentioned by name as a witness. Among other things, the founding of the Cistercian Saint Thomas's Convent on the Kyll can be traced back to him in connection with an extensive donation that brought Deudesfeld a dependence lasting centuries. Only when the convent's holdings were sold off under French rule, which began in 1794, was the bond with the ecclesiastical order broken. Deudesfeld's allegiance to the Electorate of Trier also ended with the coming of the French.

Over the centuries, Deudesfeld was not spared the evils that afflicted other communities. Witches were persecuted and the Plague swept through. In particular, though, the secular and ecclesiastical authorities led to exploitation and repression. Sackings and atrocities in mediaeval wars only made the suffering keener. In the 17th century, the village was even emptied for seven years as the villagers hid themselves in the woods to survive. Even in Napoleonic times, when French troops came marching in, things got no better; the consequences were taxes payable to the French state, and young men being pressed into the Revolutionary army.

Further hardship came on 12 September 1888 when, within a few hours, a great fire destroyed the whole southwestern part of the village, burning 21 houses (out of 80 all together) and 24 barns and stables to rubble and ashes.

The earlier half of the 20th century was characterized foremost by the two World Wars and their aftermath, even for those living in a small village in the Eifel like Deudesfeld. Reconstruction after the Second World War brought along with it a far-reaching change in structure. While until the mid 20th century the villagers had mainly been small farmers, craftsmen and forestry workers, this has over the last few decades undergone a sweeping change. In 1956 there were still 56 agricultural businesses in Deudesfeld. Today, however, the Hochscheider Hof is the only one left that is run as a full-time operation.

Since that time, tourism has also earned significant importance for Deudesfeld as one of the municipality's main income earners. This has been favoured by state recognition of Deudesfeld as a recreation municipality, as well as by its location in the wooded Vulkaneifel with its well linked hiking trails and its many nearby outing destinations.

== Politics ==
=== Mayor ===
Since 2007, Otmar Eckstein has been Deudesfeld's mayor. He succeeded Günter Bill.

=== Coat of arms ===
The German blazon reads: Im von Schwarz über Silber geteilten Schild oben ein rotweiß geschachter Schrägrechtsbalken, unten eine blaue Axt mit Beil gekreuzt.

The municipality's arms might in English heraldic language be described thus: Per fess sable a bend counter-compony argent and gules, and argent an axe and a hatchet per saltire azure, both helved of the first, the axe in bend surmounting the hatchet.

The bend (slanted stripe) with the checkerboard pattern above the line of partition is the charge borne by the Cistercian order, who held the convent founded by Ludwig von Deudesfeld. The tools below the line of partition stand for the municipality's longtime patrons, the Apostles Simon and Jude; their attributes are carpentry tools.

== Culture and sightseeing ==
=== Buildings ===
==== Main centre ====
- Saint Simon's and Saint Jude's Catholic Parish Church, Hauptstraße 14, Gothic Revival aisleless church, 1880.
- Birkenstraße/corner of Hauptstraße – wayside cross (sandstone shaft cross from 1650).
- Near Hauptstraße 1 – sandstone Heiligenhäuschen (a small, shrinelike structure consecrated to a saint or saints).
- Hauptstraße 29 – estate along the street from 1914.
- Manderscheider Straße 2 – Quereinhaus (a combination residential and commercial house divided for these two purposes down the middle, perpendicularly to the street), apparently from 1880.
- Meisburger Straße/corner of Gartenstraße – wayside cross, formerly designed for an altar (?).
- Waldweg – sandstone wayside cross, shaft cross from 18th or early 19th century.
- Mausemühle, northwest of the village on the Salm, an old mill, mostly fenced off.

==== Desserath ====
- Hauptstraße 3 – Quereinhaus, apparently from 1901.
- Turnermühle, south of Desserath on the Salm, six-axis house, possibly from the latter half of the 19th century, barn with stable.
- Wayside cross, north of the village on a service path.

== Economy and infrastructure ==
Tourism plays a great rôle in Deudesfeld. Each year sees some 50,000 overnight stays, most of them in the outlying centre of Desserath. Since 1960, Deudesfeld has been a state-recognized recreation community. Available to guests are more than 250 guest beds.
