= Udler =

- Municipality
- Coat of arms

- Location of Udler within Vulkaneifel district
- Interactive map of Udler
- Location within Germany Location within Rhineland-Palatinate
- Coordinates: 50°8′20″N 6°52′33″E
- Country: Germany
- State: Rhineland-Palatinate
- District: Vulkaneifel
- Municipal assoc.: Daun

Government
  - Mayor (2019–24): Alfred Borsch

Area
  - Total: 6.30 km^{2} (2.43 sq mi)
- Elevation: 420 m (1,380 ft)

Population (2025-12-31)
  - Total: 287
  - Density: 45.6/km^{2} (118/sq mi)
- Time zone: UTC+01:00 (CET)
  - Summer (DST): UTC+02:00 (CEST)
- Postal codes: 54552
- Dialling codes: 06573
- Vehicle registration: DAU
- Website: www.udler.de

Udler is an Ortsgemeinde – a municipality belonging to a Verbandsgemeinde, a kind of collective municipality – in the Vulkaneifel district in Rhineland-Palatinate, Germany. It belongs to the Verbandsgemeinde of Daun, whose seat is in the like-named town.

== Geography ==
The municipality lies in the Vulkaneifel, a part of the Eifel known for its volcanic history, geographical and geological features, and even ongoing activity today, including gases that sometimes well up from the earth.

== History ==
Udler, earlier known as Odeler and Oudler, belonged beginning in 1357 to the Electoral-Trier Amt of Daun. After the Prussian takeover of the Rhineland, to which Udler then belonged, the village passed in 1815 or 1816 to the then newly formed Daun district and belonged to the Bürgermeisterei (“Mayoralty”) of Gillenfeld. In the early 19th century, the village had 188 inhabitants living in 33 houses.

=== Population development ===
The figures given for the years 1871 to 1987 come from censuses.

- 1815 – 151
- 1835 – 219
- 1871 – 220
- 1905 – 229
- 1939 – 262
- 1950 – 226
- 1961 – 223
- 1970 – 287
- 1987 – 249
- 2002 – 212

== Politics ==
=== Municipal council ===
The council is made up of 12 council members, who were elected by majority vote at the municipal election held on 7 June 2009, and the honorary mayor as chairman.

=== Coat of arms ===
The German blazon reads: Unter silbernem Schildhaupt, darin ein rotes Balkenkreuz, in Blau auf einem silbernen Stein stehende silberne Taube.

The municipality's arms might in English heraldic language be described thus: Azure a dove standing on a stone argent, on a chief of the second a cross gules.

The red cross in the chief symbolizes Udler's former allegiance to the Electoral-Trier Amt of Daun, which began in 1357. The tincture azure (blue) in the main field stands for the Sangweiher, a former Electoral fishpond in the municipality. The dove is a reference to the so-called Taubenlehen (“dove fief”), a promise that Eberhard von Udler made to the Church of the Saviour (Salvatorkirche) in 1522 because he wanted to be healed of gout. This promise was later transferred to the municipality of Udler. The municipality's patron saint is Saint Stephen, who was martyred by being stoned to death. He is thus symbolized by the second charge in the main field, the stone.

== Culture and sightseeing ==
=== Buildings ===
- Former Saint Stephen’s Catholic Church, Hauptstraße 25 – late mediaeval quire tower, nave renovated in 1734.
- Schalkenmehrener Straße 6/8 – house, apparently from 1751.
- Schalkenmehrener Straße 15 – former bakehouse, one-floor plastered building, late 19th century.
