= Daun (Verbandsgemeinde) =

- Verbandsgemeinde
- Coat of arms

- Location of Daun within Vulkaneifel district
- Interactive map of Daun
- Location within Germany Location within Rhineland-Palatinate
- Coordinates: 50°11′52″N 6°49′42″E
- Country: Germany
- State: Rhineland-Palatinate
- District: Vulkaneifel
- Subdivisions: 38 municipalities

Government
  - Mayor (2021–29): Thomas Scheppe

Area
  - Total: 31.589 km^{2} (12.197 sq mi)
- Elevation: 494 m (1,621 ft)

Population (2025-12-31)
  - Total: 21,867
  - Density: 692.23/km^{2} (1,792.9/sq mi)
- Time zone: UTC+01:00 (CET)
  - Summer (DST): UTC+02:00 (CEST)
- Vehicle registration: DAU
- Website: www.vgv-daun.de

Daun is a collective municipality (Verbandsgemeinde) in the Vulkaneifel district of Rhineland-Palatinate, Germany. The seat of the Daun Verbandsgemeinde is in the municipality of Daun.

The Verbandsgemeinde Daun consists of the following Ortsgemeinden ("local municipalities"):

1. Betteldorf
2. Bleckhausen
3. Brockscheid
4. Darscheid
5. Daun
6. Demerath
7. Deudesfeld
8. Dockweiler
9. Dreis-Brück
10. Ellscheid
11. Gefell
12. Gillenfeld
13. Hinterweiler
14. Hörscheid
15. Immerath
16. Kirchweiler
17. Kradenbach
18. Mehren
19. Meisburg
20. Mückeln
21. Nerdlen
22. Niederstadtfeld
23. Oberstadtfeld
24. Sarmersbach
25. Saxler
26. Schalkenmehren
27. Schönbach
28. Schutz
29. Steineberg
30. Steiningen
31. Strohn
32. Strotzbüsch
33. Udler
34. Üdersdorf
35. Utzerath
36. Wallenborn
37. Weidenbach
38. Winkel
