= Hinterweiler =

- Municipality
- Coat of arms

- Location of Hinterweiler within Vulkaneifel district
- Interactive map of Hinterweiler
- Location within Germany Location within Rhineland-Palatinate
- Coordinates: 50°14′13″N 6°45′25″E
- Country: Germany
- State: Rhineland-Palatinate
- District: Vulkaneifel
- Municipal assoc.: Daun

Government
  - Mayor (2019–24): Sebastian Koch

Area
  - Total: 5.32 km^{2} (2.05 sq mi)
- Elevation: 534 m (1,752 ft)

Population (2025-12-31)
  - Total: 213
  - Density: 40.0/km^{2} (104/sq mi)
- Time zone: UTC+01:00 (CET)
  - Summer (DST): UTC+02:00 (CEST)
- Postal codes: 54570
- Dialling codes: 06595
- Vehicle registration: DAU
- Website: www.hinterweiler.de

Hinterweiler is an Ortsgemeinde – a municipality belonging to a Verbandsgemeinde, a kind of collective municipality – in the Vulkaneifel district in Rhineland-Palatinate, Germany. It belongs to the Verbandsgemeinde of Daun, whose seat is in the like-named town.

== Geography ==
The municipality lies in the Vulkaneifel, a part of the Eifel known for its volcanic history, geographical and geological features, and even ongoing activity today, including gases that sometimes well up from the earth.

== History ==
Although Hinterweiler has never had the importance of some other centres, it can look back on a long history. Finds in the area called Im Gemeindewinkel (“In the Municipality’s Corner”) show that there must have been a Celtic settlement there. Traces of settlement from Roman times found to the north of the village at the foot of the Ernstberg and about 500 m west of the village bear witness to the Ernstberg's having been used as a place of worship in those days. The unearthing of a Frankish grave in Hinterweiler furthermore shows that the Franks, who came after Rome's downfall, settled Hinterweiler in the latter half of the first millennium AD. It can also be concluded from the name of a rural cadastral area that there was once a monastery within Hinterweiler's current municipal limits.

Witnessed in documents is Hinterweiler's early name before the year 349, which was simply Whyler, which meant “place” (its Modern High German descendant, Weiler, means “hamlet”), and it was also certain that the neighbouring place was also called Whyler. Whether the modern name Hinterweiler was derived from hinter Whyler (“behind Whyler”) is unknown. This is presumed, but there is no proof.

Within the Roman ruin site “Im Kloster” (“In the Monastery”), it has also been confirmed that there is a drystone-masonry grave, although with no grave goods, which could be from Merovingian times. In feudal times the village belonged to the Amt of Daun in the Archbishopric of Trier. In Prussian times, Hinterweiler was a municipality in the Bürgermeisterei (“Mayoralty”) of Rockeskyll.

From the Middle Ages until about 1930, millstones were mined at the foot of the Ernstberg.

Even today, church records stand as a main reference source. According to them, Hinterweiler was home to three smaller churches in the Middle Ages, of which only one chapel – the current building dates from 1860 – remains today. At that time, a population figure of 356 souls was counted within the parish. Higher than today's figure, too, was the number of hearths – and this surely meant households – in the village.

== Politics ==
=== Municipal council ===
The council is made up of 6 council members, who were elected at the municipal election held on 7 June 2009, and the honorary mayor as chairman.

=== Mayor ===
Hinterweiler's mayor is Sebastian Koch.

=== Coat of arms ===
The German blazon reads: Schild mit Bogen zum Schildhaupt geteilt, oben in Silber ein wachsender, schwarzer, rotbewehrter Adler, unten in Grün ein mit 3 goldenen Ähren belegter, silberner Mühlstein.

The municipality's arms might in English heraldic language be described thus: Per fess abased embowed, argent a demi-eagle sable armed and langued gules and vert a millstone of the first surmounted by three ears of wheat radiating from the hole Or.

The parting is meant to represent a mountain, the nearly 700 m-high Ernstberg. The charge below the line of partition, the millstone, represents the former millstone quarry at the foot of this mountain. The three ears of wheat stand for what was for centuries the village's main livelihood: agriculture. The eagle is Saint John the Evangelist's attribute, thus representing the municipality's and the church's patron saint.

== Culture and sightseeing ==
Buildings:

- Saint John's Catholic Church (branch church; Filialkirche St. Johannes), Hauptstraße 38, triaxial aisleless church, 1860.
- Hauptstraße – Wayside cross, basalt beam cross.
- Zum Ernstberg 1 a – estate along street with eaves forward.
