= Betteldorf =

- Municipality
- Coat of arms

- Location of Betteldorf within Vulkaneifel district
- Interactive map of Betteldorf
- Location within Germany Location within Rhineland-Palatinate
- Coordinates: 50°15′08″N 6°45′21″E
- Country: Germany
- State: Rhineland-Palatinate
- District: Vulkaneifel
- Municipal assoc.: Daun

Government
  - Mayor (2019–24): Frank Spies

Area
  - Total: 3.31 km^{2} (1.28 sq mi)
- Elevation: 540 m (1,770 ft)

Population (2025-12-31)
  - Total: 241
  - Density: 72.8/km^{2} (189/sq mi)
- Time zone: UTC+01:00 (CET)
  - Summer (DST): UTC+02:00 (CEST)
- Postal codes: 54570
- Dialling codes: 06595
- Vehicle registration: DAU
- Website: www.betteldorf.de

Betteldorf is an Ortsgemeinde – a municipality belonging to a Verbandsgemeinde, a kind of collective municipality – in the Vulkaneifel district in Rhineland-Palatinate, Germany. It belongs to the Verbandsgemeinde of Daun, whose seat is in the like-named town.

== Geography ==
=== Location ===
The municipality lies in the High Eifel at the foot of the Döhmberg, some 11 km northwest of the district seat of Daun. To the south, Bundesstraße 410 runs by the village.

== History ==
Betteldorf’s name goes back to a Roman whose name was Betilo, and who ran a way station in what is now the municipal area where horses were changed on the Meuse-Moselle Roman road.

== Politics ==
=== Municipal council ===
The council is made up of 8 council members, who were elected by majority vote at the municipal election held on 7 June 2009, and the honorary mayor as chairman.

=== Coat of arms ===
The German blazon reads: Unter rotem Schildhaupt, darin eine goldene Zange, in Gold ein grüner Leistenschragen, belegt mit einer roten Mispel mit goldenem Butzen.

The municipality’s arms might in English heraldic language be described thus: Or a saltire vert surmounted by a medlar blossom gules seeded of the field, in a chief of the third a pair of tongs fesswise of the field.

The local patron saint is Saint Apollonia, whose attribute, the tongs, stands as a charge in the chief. The saltire (X-shaped cross) refers to the Roman roads that crossed southwest of the Döhmberg. The early Roman settlement here is also documented by important finds of troves of coins. The red medlar blossom with the golden centre (“seeded of the field”, that is to say, “Or”, or gold) is taken from the arms borne by the Duke of Arenberg, under whose rule Betteldorf fell after the last Count of Manderscheid died. The tinctures gules and Or (red and gold) come from the Manderscheids’ arms.

== Culture and sightseeing ==
=== Buildings ===
Among the municipality’s sightseeing points of interest is Saint Apollonia’s Catholic Branch Church at Auf dem Höfchen 2. This is an aisleless church from the 18th century that was expanded about 1895 and again after 1945.

At Hauptstraße 20 stands a house with plasterwork, said to be from 1799.

Through the local youth social club’s efforts, a memorial was erected in the summer of 1922 in memory of those who fell in the First World War. On a red sandstone block stands a figure of the Archangel Michael.

=== Natural monuments ===
Some 750 m north of the village stands a menhir that since 1938 has been under protection as a natural monument.
