= Kaperich =

- Municipality
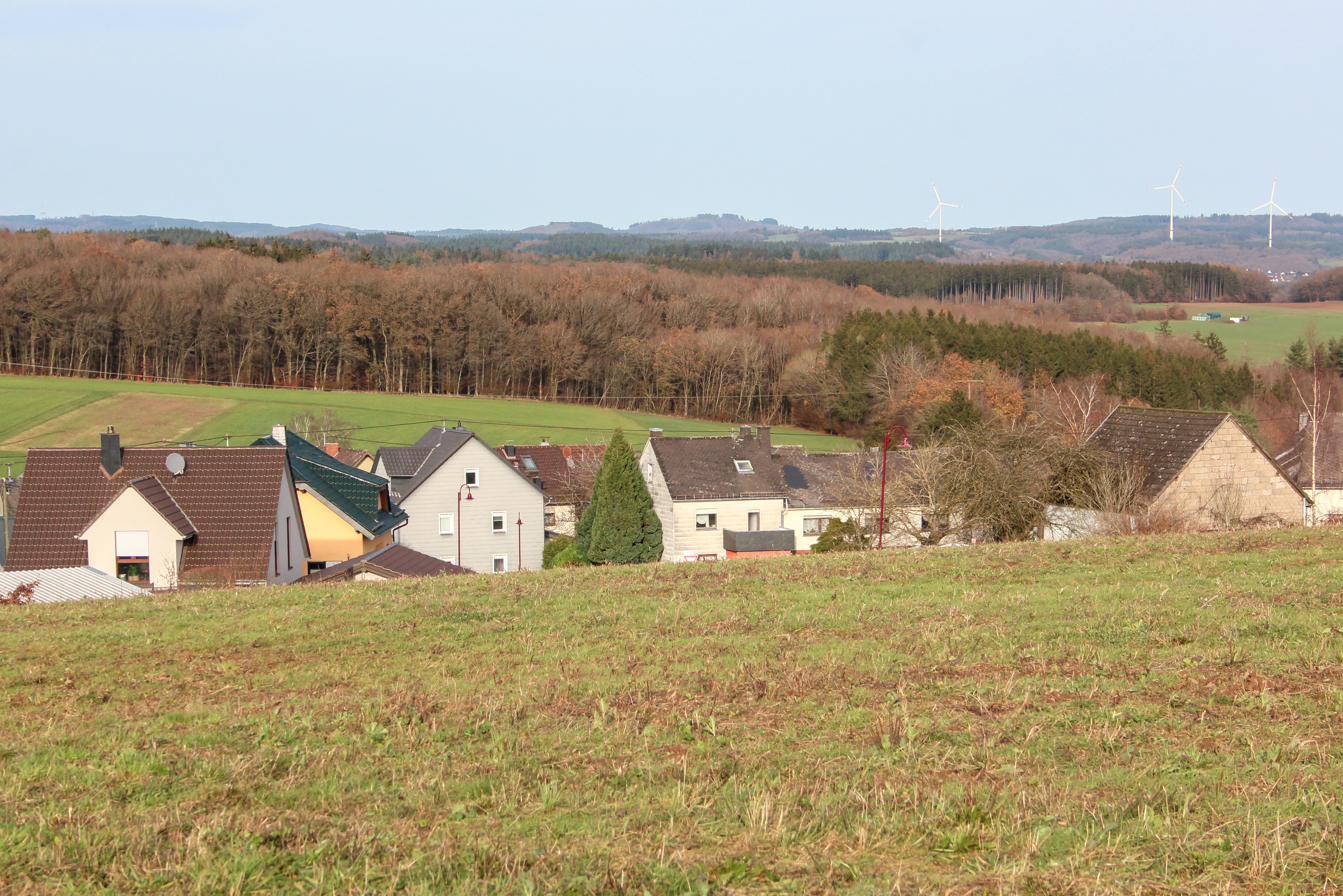

- Location of Kaperich within Vulkaneifel district
- Interactive map of Kaperich
- Location within Germany Location within Rhineland-Palatinate
- Coordinates: 50°15′00″N 7°01′35″E
- Country: Germany
- State: Rhineland-Palatinate
- District: Vulkaneifel
- Municipal assoc.: Kelberg

Government
  - Mayor (2019–24): Robert Karst

Area
  - Total: 2.69 km^{2} (1.04 sq mi)
- Elevation: 470 m (1,540 ft)

Population (2025-12-31)
  - Total: 167
  - Density: 62.1/km^{2} (161/sq mi)
- Time zone: UTC+01:00 (CET)
  - Summer (DST): UTC+02:00 (CEST)
- Postal codes: 56767
- Dialling codes: 02657
- Vehicle registration: DAU
- Website: www.kaperich.de

Kaperich is an Ortsgemeinde – a municipality belonging to a Verbandsgemeinde, a kind of collective municipality – in the Vulkaneifel district in Rhineland-Palatinate, Germany. It belongs to the Verbandsgemeinde of Kelberg, whose seat is in the like-named municipality.

== Geography ==
=== Location ===
The municipality lies in the Vulkaneifel, a part of the Eifel known for its volcanic history, geographical and geological features, and even ongoing activity today, including gases that sometimes well up from the earth.

=== Neighbouring municipalities ===
Kaperich’s neighbours are Lirstal, Höchstberg and Uersfeld.

=== Constituent communities ===
Kaperich has an outlying hamlet called Kölnische Höfe, which is home to roughly 25 people. This hamlet is sometimes also called “Pochtener Höfe”.

== History ==
In feudal times, Kaperich belonged until 1794 to the Electoral-Cologne Amt of Nürburg. Under Prussian administration, Kaperich became a municipality in the Adenau district and the Amt of Kelberg, until 1932. After administrative reform in 1970, the municipality, along with others in the Amt of Kelberg, passed to what was then known as the Daun district; the same district is now called the Vulkaneifel district.

=== Kölnische Höfe ===
Kölnische Höfe, sometimes also called Pochtener Höfe, was built sometime about 1500. In 1741, the Uersfeld church books listed two estates there.

The name “Kölnische Höfe” goes back to the former Electorate of Cologne landholdings there (“Cologne” is Köln in German), and the popular name “Pochtener Höfe” comes from the hamlet’s location in the Pochtener Wald (forest), which had its first documentary mention as Puthena in 1050.

Except in instances such as road signs and titles in documents, the name almost never takes the form “Kölnische Höfe” owing to the niceties of German grammar, for “Kölnische Höfe” is the form unprejudiced by an article. However, in common usage, the name always takes a definite article. Furthermore, it also inflects for case. Thus it is die Kölnischen Höfe in the nominative and accusative, den Kölnischen Höfen in the dative and der Kölnischen Höfe in the genitive. The name is also plural, meaning that the verb must take the third-person plural form if the name is the subject.

The communal bakehouse (Backhaus, or more popularly Backes in German) standing at the entrance to the hamlet is under monumental protection, and as such is the only building in the municipality with this distinction (see Culture and sightseeing – Buildings below). The quarrystone building was built in 1923.

== Politics ==
=== Municipal council ===
The council is made up of 6 council members, who were elected by majority vote at the municipal election held on 7 June 2009, and the honorary mayor as chairman.

=== Mayor ===
Kaperich’s mayor is Robert Karst.

== Culture and sightseeing ==
=== Buildings ===
- Communal bakehouse in outlying hamlet of Kölnische Höfe, quarrystone building, 1923.

=== Regular events ===
Since 1985, in the outlying hamlet of Kölnische Höfe, a “bakehouse festival” (Backesfest) has been held every other year in September. Up to 1,500 visitors take part in this event, which is organized by the “Hiester Wanderverein” (hiking club).
