= Gattan-e Sofla =

Gattan-e Sofla گتان سفلي
- Village
- Location within Iran
- Coordinates: 25°59′05″N 57°17′26″E
- Country: Iran
- Province: Hormozgan
- County: Jask
- Bakhsh: Central
- Rural District: Kangan

Population (2006)
  - Total: 386
- Time zone: UTC+3:30 (IRST)
  - Summer (DST): UTC+4:30 (IRDT)

Gattan-e Sofla (Persian: گتان سفلي, also Romanized as Gattān-e Soflá; also known as Gattān-e Pā’īn and Gattān-e Pākūhī) is a village in Kangan Rural District, in the Central District of Jask County, Hormozgan Province, Iran. At the 2006 census, its population was 386, in 67 families.
