= Bongard =

- Municipality
- Coat of arms

- Location of Bongard within Vulkaneifel district
- Interactive map of Bongard
- Location within Germany Location within Rhineland-Palatinate
- Coordinates: 50°17′35″N 6°50′21″E
- Country: Germany
- State: Rhineland-Palatinate
- District: Vulkaneifel
- Municipal assoc.: Kelberg

Government
  - Mayor (2019–24): Alois Sicken

Area
  - Total: 6.64 km^{2} (2.56 sq mi)
- Elevation: 495 m (1,624 ft)

Population (2025-12-31)
  - Total: 240
  - Density: 36/km^{2} (94/sq mi)
- Time zone: UTC+01:00 (CET)
  - Summer (DST): UTC+02:00 (CEST)
- Postal codes: 53539
- Dialling codes: 02692
- Vehicle registration: DAU

Bongard is an Ortsgemeinde – a municipality belonging to a Verbandsgemeinde, a kind of collective municipality – in the Vulkaneifel district in Rhineland-Palatinate, Germany. It belongs to the Verbandsgemeinde of Kelberg, whose seat is in the like-named municipality.

== Geography ==
The municipality lies in the Vulkaneifel, a part of the Eifel known for its volcanic history, geographical and geological features, and even ongoing activity today, including gases that sometimes well up from the earth.

== History ==
The first known dwellers of the lands in and around what is now Bongard were the Celts (about 500 BC). They lived on and at the Barsberg (mountain), and even today, the once roughly 60 m-long and perhaps 7 m-high protective wall can still be made out.

From the Middle Ages until the late 18th century, Bongard belonged to the Electorate of Trier.

== Politics ==
=== Municipal council ===
The council is made up of 6 council members, who were elected by majority vote at the municipal election held on 7 June 2009, and the honorary mayor as chairman.

=== Coat of arms ===
The German blazon reads: Unter rotem Schildhaupt mit silberner Zange, in Silber auf grünem Boden ein auffliegender roter, goldbewehrter Falke mit erhobenem rechten Fuß.

The municipality's arms might in English heraldic language be described thus: "Argent on a mount vert a falcon surgerant gules armed Or, the dexter leg raised, in a chief of the third a pair of tongs fesswise of the first."

According to information from the Koblenz Main State Archive, the noble family “von dem Bongart gen Dumegin” bore a charge in their seal much like the falcon in these arms. The seal was localized for Bongard by Kelberg and showed “einen auffliegenen Falken mit erhobenem rechten Fuß” or “a falcon surgerant (or rising, that is, getting ready to fly as shown by the position of the wings) with raised dexter (that is, right) foot”. This old noble armorial bearing now appears on Bongard's municipal arms below the chief. Bongard has long revered Saint Agatha as the church's and the village's patron saint. One of her attributes, the tongs, appears as a charge in the chief. The field tinctures gules and argent (red and silver) refer to the village's former allegiance to the Electorate of Trier.

== Culture and sightseeing ==
=== Buildings ===
- Saint Agatha's Catholic Church, Blankenheimer Straße, Baroque Revival quarrystone aisleless church; the complex is surrounded by churchyard, which itself is surrounded by a quarrystone wall
- Blankenheimer Straße 4 – timber-frame house, partly solid, early or mid 19th century
- Blankenheimer Straße 21 – timber-frame estate along street, 18th century
- Blankenheimer Straße 26 – timber-frame house, partly solid, plastered, possibly essentially from the 18th century, perhaps older
- Blankenheimer Straße 27 (nearby) – stately barn, quarrystone and timber-frame, earlier half of 19th century
- Blankenheimer Straße 30 – sprawling estate complex, former plastered timber-frame house, partly solid, current house a six-axis plastered house, latter half of the 19th century, bakehouse and other commercial buildings

=== Religion ===
The citizens of Bongard are roughly 90% Roman Catholic. Bongard belongs to the parish of Bodenbach. People from Bongard also like to visit the Heyerbergkapelle (chapel) with its Way of the Cross in the forest.
