= Gattan-e Olya =

Gattan-e Olya گتان عليا
- Village
- Location within Iran
- Coordinates: 25°59′21″N 57°17′38″E
- Country: Iran
- Province: Hormozgan
- County: Jask
- Bakhsh: Central
- Rural District: Kangan

Population (2006)
  - Total: 547
- Time zone: UTC+3:30 (IRST)
  - Summer (DST): UTC+4:30 (IRDT)

Gattan-e Olya (Persian: گتان عليا, also Romanized as Gattān-e ‘Olyā; also known as Bongard, Gatān, Gattān-e Bālā, and Gattān-e Nābī) is a village in Kangan Rural District, in the Central District of Jask County, Hormozgan Province, Iran. At the 2006 census, its population was 547, in 102 families.
