= Daun, Germany =

Daun
- Town
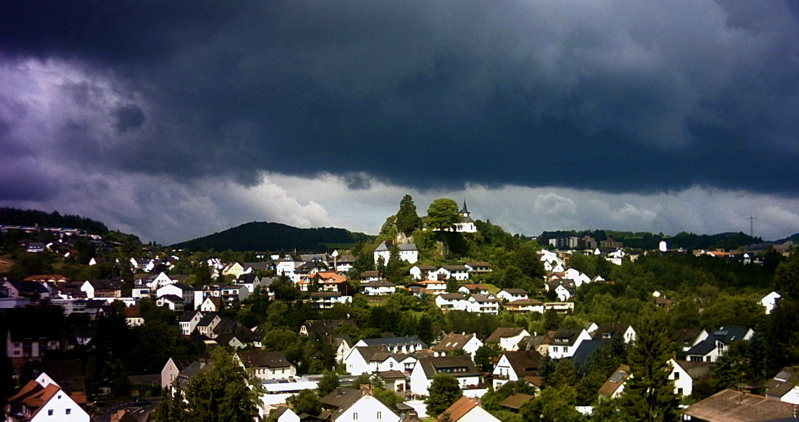

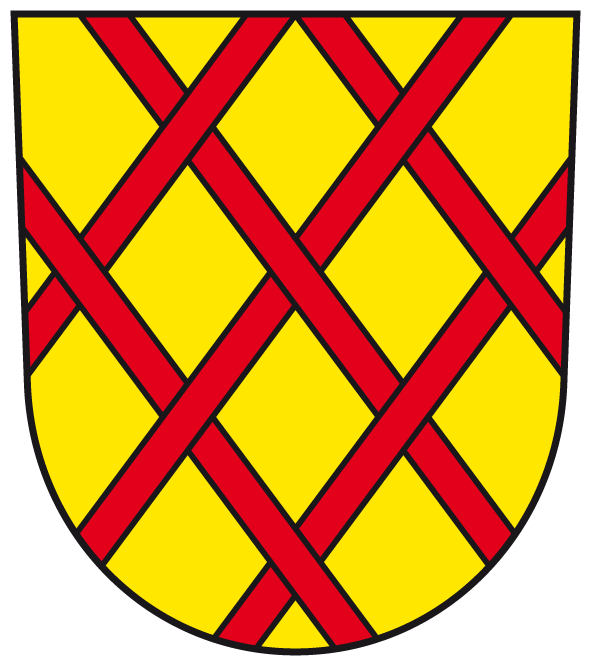
- Coat of arms

- Location of Daun within Vulkaneifel district
- Interactive map of Daun
- Location within Germany Location within Rhineland-Palatinate
- Coordinates: 50°11′55″N 6°49′55″E
- Country: Germany
- State: Rhineland-Palatinate
- District: Vulkaneifel
- Municipal assoc.: Daun
- Subdivisions: 8

Government
  - Mayor (2019–24): Friedhelm Marder (CDU)

Area
  - Total: 49.02 km^{2} (18.93 sq mi)
- Elevation: 410 m (1,350 ft)

Population (2025-12-31)
  - Total: 7,488
  - Density: 152.8/km^{2} (395.6/sq mi)
- Time zone: UTC+01:00 (CET)
  - Summer (DST): UTC+02:00 (CEST)
- Postal codes: 54550
- Dialling codes: 06592
- Vehicle registration: DAU
- Website: www.stadt-daun.de

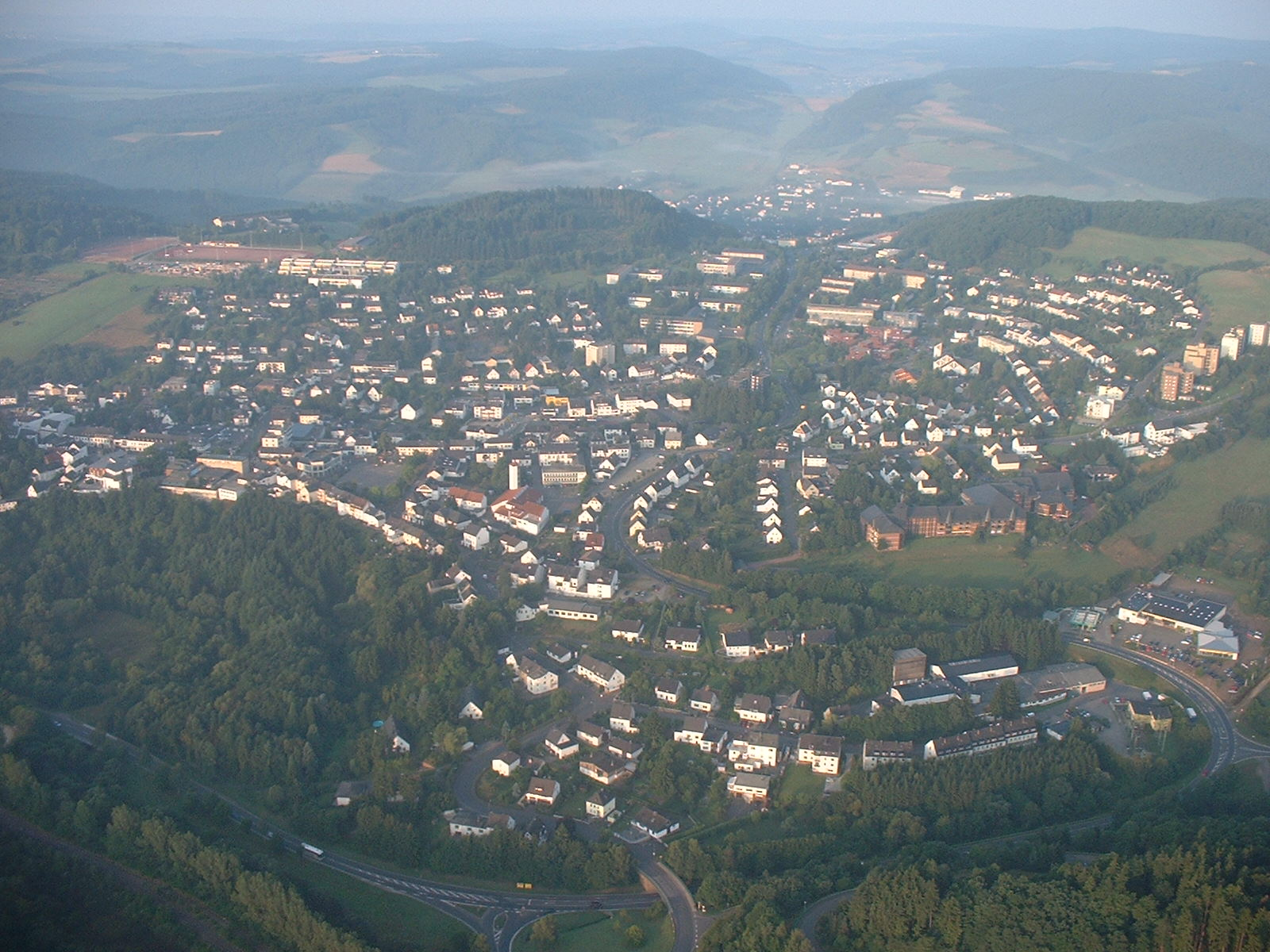
Aerial view of Daun

Daun (German pronunciation: [daʊn]) is a town in the Vulkaneifel district in Rhineland-Palatinate, Germany. It is the district seat and also the seat of the Verbandsgemeinde of Daun.

== Geography ==
=== Location ===
The town lies in the Vulkaneifel, a part of the Eifel known for its volcanic history, geographical and geological features, and even ongoing activity today, including gases that sometimes well up from the earth. Daun lies south of the High Eifel on the river Lieser. Found from 2.5 to 3.5 km southeast of Daun’s town centre are the Dauner Maare, a group of three volcanic lakes separated almost wholly by only the walls of tuff between them. The town is home to the Eifel-Vulkanmuseum. Daun is furthermore a spa town and has mineral water springs.

=== Constituent communities ===
The district seat of Daun has 8,514 inhabitants (as of 31 December 2005, counting only those with their main residence in the town). Besides the main town, also called Daun (4,264 inhabitants), the municipal area also includes these outlying centres (Stadtteile) that were formerly self-administering municipalities:

| Centre | Population | amalgamated |
|---|---|---|
| Boverath | 564 | 7 June 1969 |
| Gemünden | 215 | 1 April 1938 |
| Neunkirchen | 547 | 7 June 1969 |
| Pützborn | 1,129 | 7 June 1969 |
| Rengen | 438 | 7 November 1970 |
| Steinborn | 410 | 7 November 1970 |
| Waldkönigen | 699 | 7 November 1970 |
| Weiersbach | 251 | 10 June 1979 |

== History ==
The first settlement in the area came as early as the 7th century BC by which time the Celts had settled the fortified basalt mountain in Daun. The Romans, too, used this prominent hill in the Lieser valley as a watch post, as witnessed by Roman finds. The placename may have come from the Celtic-Roman word Dunum, meaning either “fence” or “fortified heights”, that is to say, a fort.

In the late 10th century, a castle complex belonging to the free Lords of Daun arose here. In 1075, Daun had its first documentary mention in a townsman named Adalbero de Duna.

In 1163, the free lords’ family died out. One of the family’s ministeriales, Richardus de Duna, took over his former Lord’s name and even the coat of arms with the Daun fretting. In 1337, Daun is mentioned for the first time as being a town. In 1346 came a grant of town rights along with market rights, and Daun became at the same time the location of a high court.

In 1712, the Electoral-Trier Amtshaus was built by the Elector of Trier and Archbishop Karl-Josef on the Burgberg ("Castle Mountain"). After a transitory occupation by the French beginning in 1794, the village passed in 1815 to the Kingdom of Prussia. In 1817, Daun became seat of the district and an Amt mayoralty, and also at the same time a district administrator’s seat. Since 1947, it has been part of the then newly founded state of Rhineland-Palatinate. Beginning in 1951, Daun could once more call itself a town.

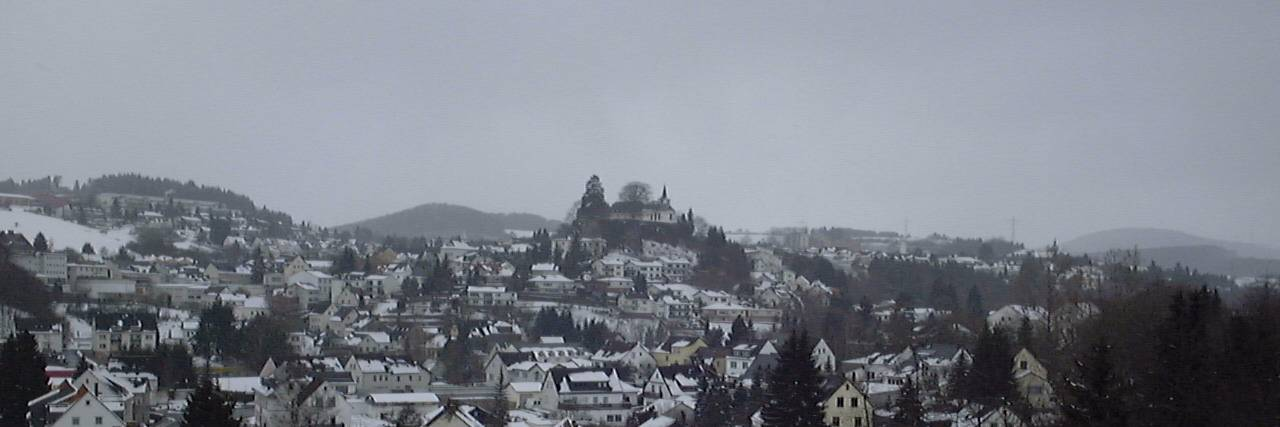
Daun in winter

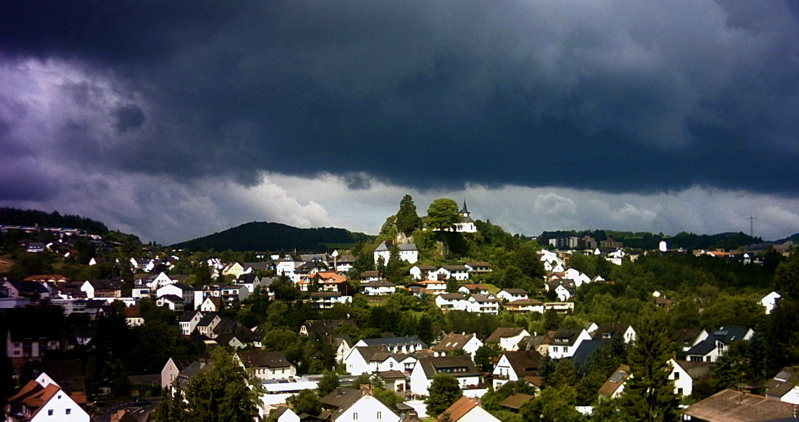
Daun in summer

On 15 May 1895, Daun was linked to the German railway network with the Eifelquerbahn (Cross Eifel Railway). On 1 December 1909, a further railway line, the Maare-Mosel-Bahn to Wittlich came into service. All public rail transport, however, ended in Daun more than a decade ago, although a two-hourly daytime service for tourists has been running in the summertime since 2005 on part of the Eifelquerbahn. The Maare-Mosel-Bahn, on the other hand, was torn up about a decade ago and has since become the Maare-Mosel-Radweg, a cycle path.

In 1965, Daun became a garrison town, housing at the Heinrich Hertz Barracks, among others, two signal corps units and one signals intelligence unit.

== Politics ==
=== Town council ===
The council is made up of 12 council members, who were elected at the municipal election held on 25 May 2014, and the mayor as chairman.

=== Mayor ===
Daun’s mayor is Friedhelm Marder (CDU).

=== Coat of arms ===
The town’s arms might be described thus: Or fretty gules.

The arms now borne by the town are the ones once borne by the Lords of Daun, and date from the 13th century. When the Lords died out, the town passed to the Electorate of Trier, thus explaining the Cross of Trier that appeared in seals dating from the 16th and following centuries. The current arms, however, are the Lords’ original ones.

The Armorial Wijnbergen, dating from c. 1270 - c. 1285, includes Ferry II of Daun, lord of Oberstein (blazon: Argent fretty sable).

=== Town partnerships ===
Daun fosters partnerships with the following places:

- Carisolo, Trentino, Italy since 4 April 2004

== Culture and sightseeing ==
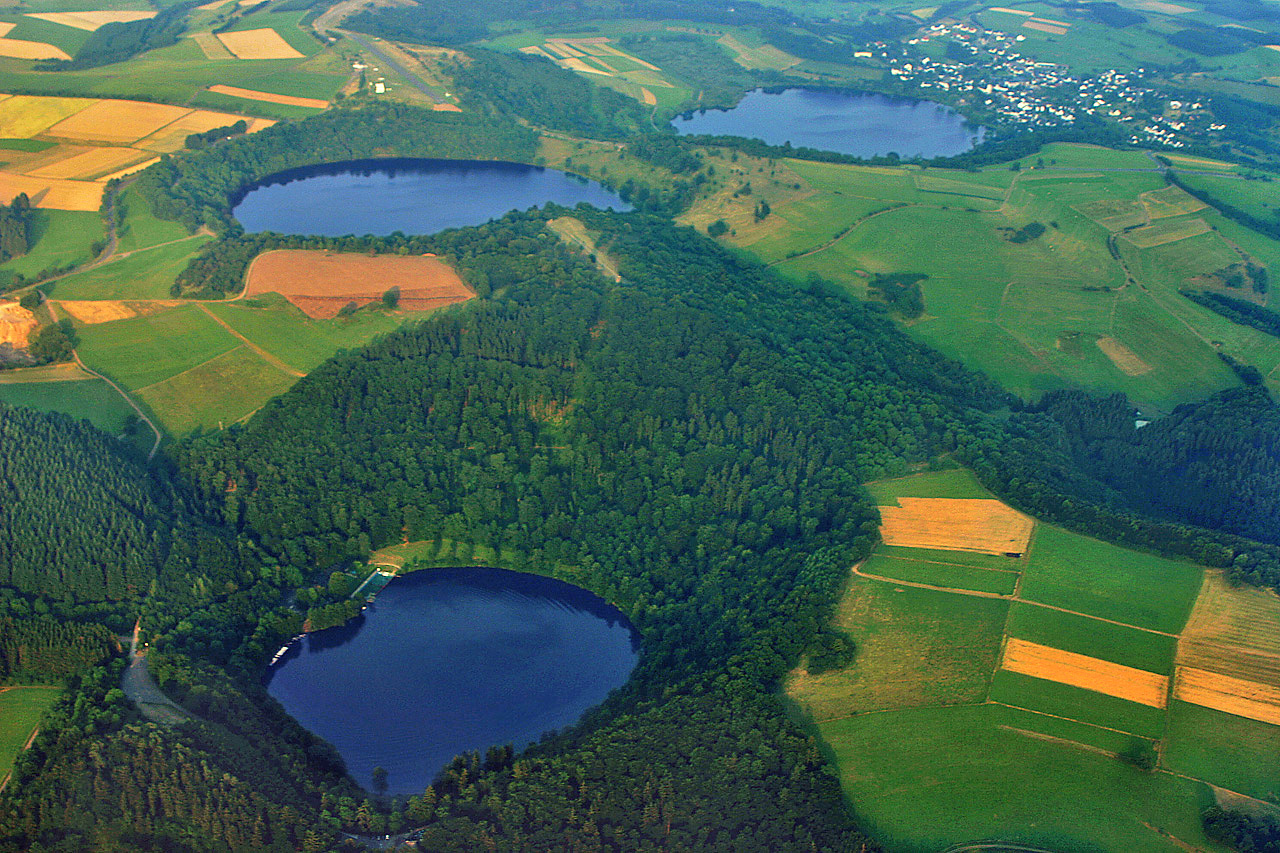
Gemünd Maar, Weinfeld Maar and Schalkenmehren Maar

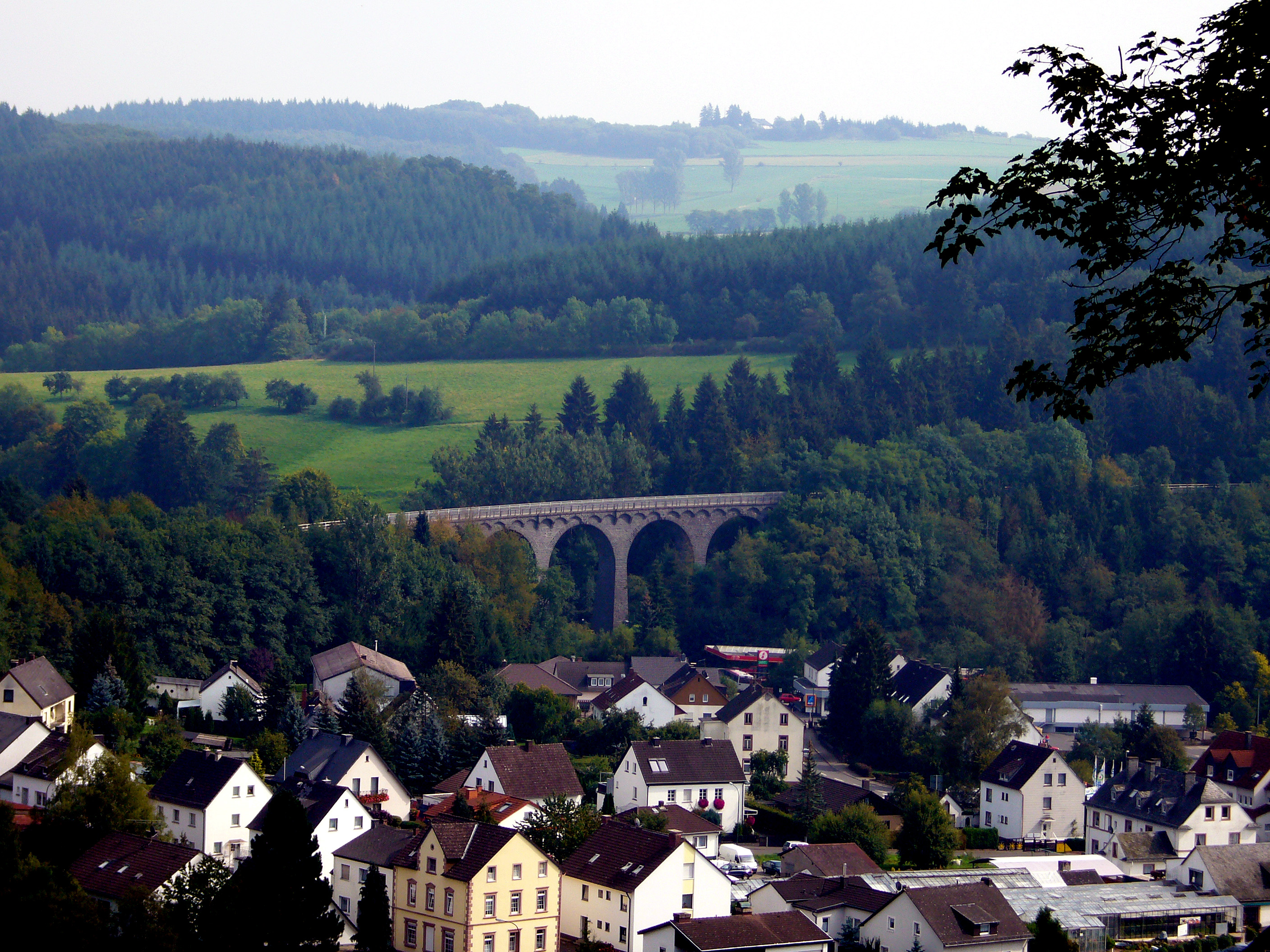
Railway viaduct in Daun, 2006

=== Natural monuments ===
- Gemünd Maar
- Schalkenmehren Maar
- Weinfeld Maar

A maar is a broad-low relief volcanic crater often filled with rainwater. Tuff rings sometimes surround a maar. There are many in the Volcanic Eifel.

=== Buildings ===
- Daun Castle (Dauner Burg)
  - Electoral-Trier Amtshaus (today a hotel) from 1712
  - Evangelical church (1865/67)
  - Tithe barn from 1740
  - Burgmann houses: Waldenhof, Hof Rademacher
- Railway viaduct from 1909
- Saint Nicholas’s Catholic Parish Church, west tower and crypt Romanesque, mid 13th century, new building work done between 1946 and 1969
- Railway station building, roof with half-hipped gables, 1895
- Former Evangelical graveyard with elaborate grave markers from the 19th century
- Former mayoral building (Burgfriedstraße 25)
- Kampbüchelskreuz (cross) from about 1825 (Leopoldstraße, at the marketplace)
- Former Kaiserbrunnen (“Emperor’s Fountain”), 1911, warriors’ memorial from after 1945 (Leopoldstraße, at the former district administrator’s office)
- Former district administrator’s office, 1830/31, today the Volcano Museum (Leopoldstraße)
- Former recreation home of the department store chain Leonhard Tietz (Kaufhof), 1910
- Former Amt court from 1860 (Wirichstraße, today a savings bank branch)
- Warriors’ memorial 1870/71
- Former school building from about 1910/20 (Leopoldstraße 34, today a civil registry office)

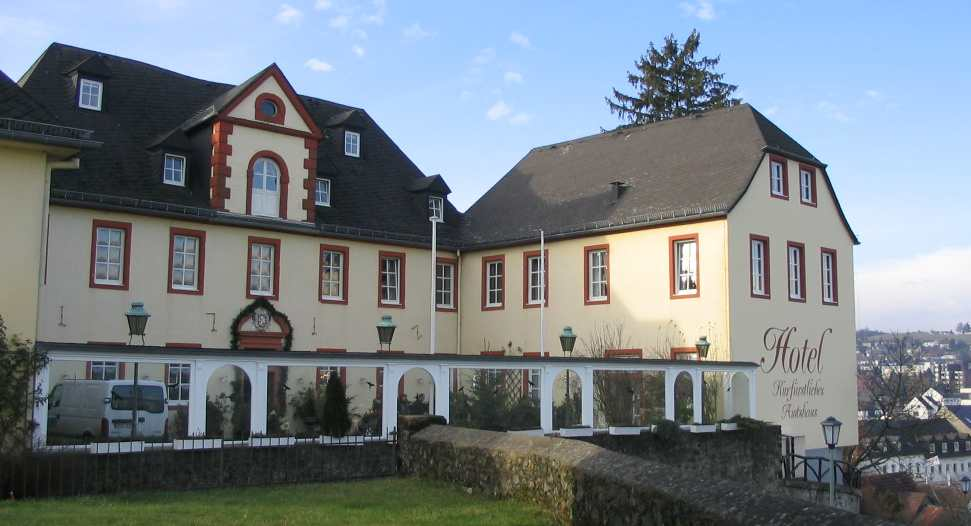
Daun, Burg Daun monumental zone: former Electoral-Trier Amtshaus

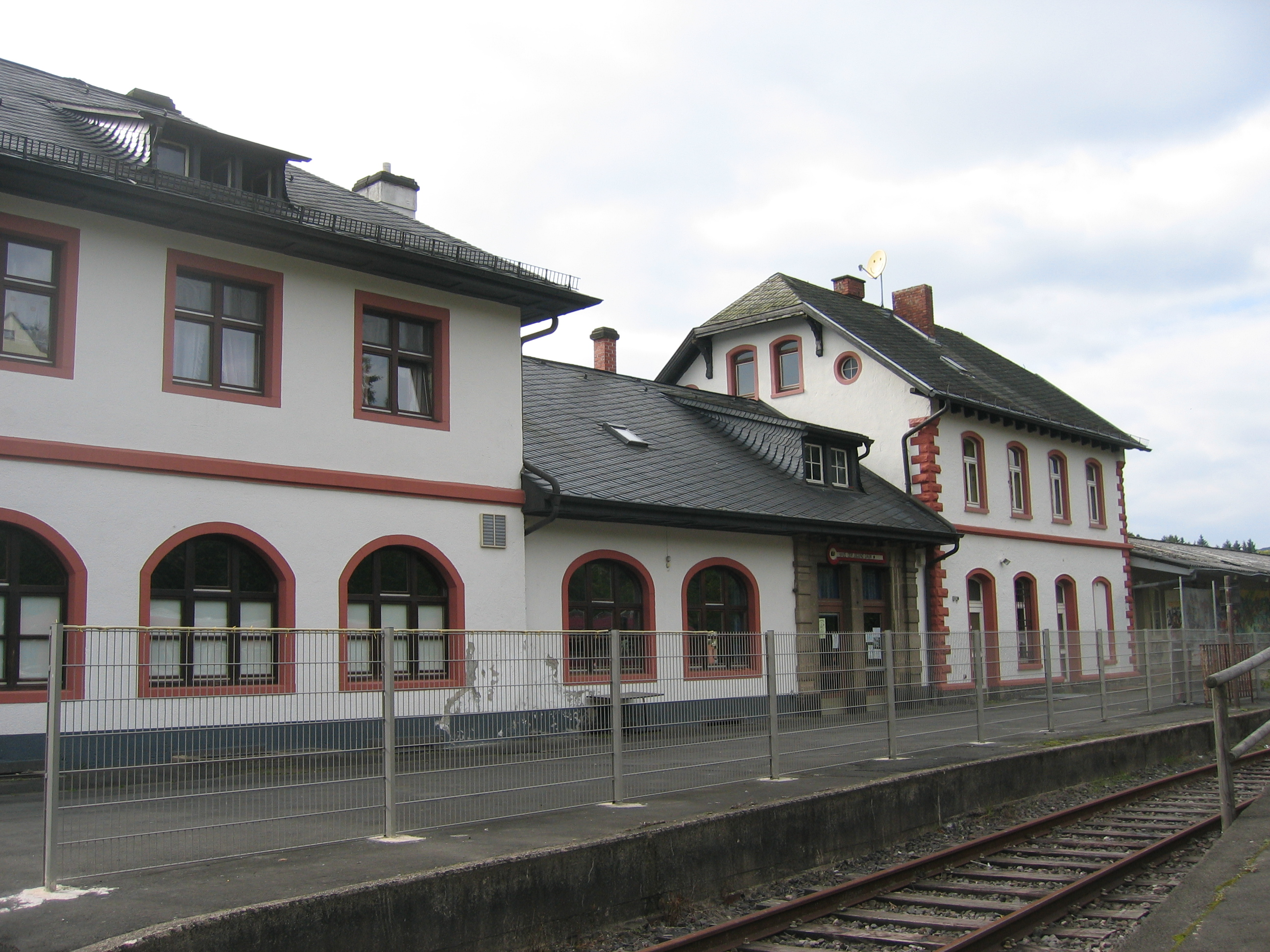
Daun, Bahnhofstraße: former railway station

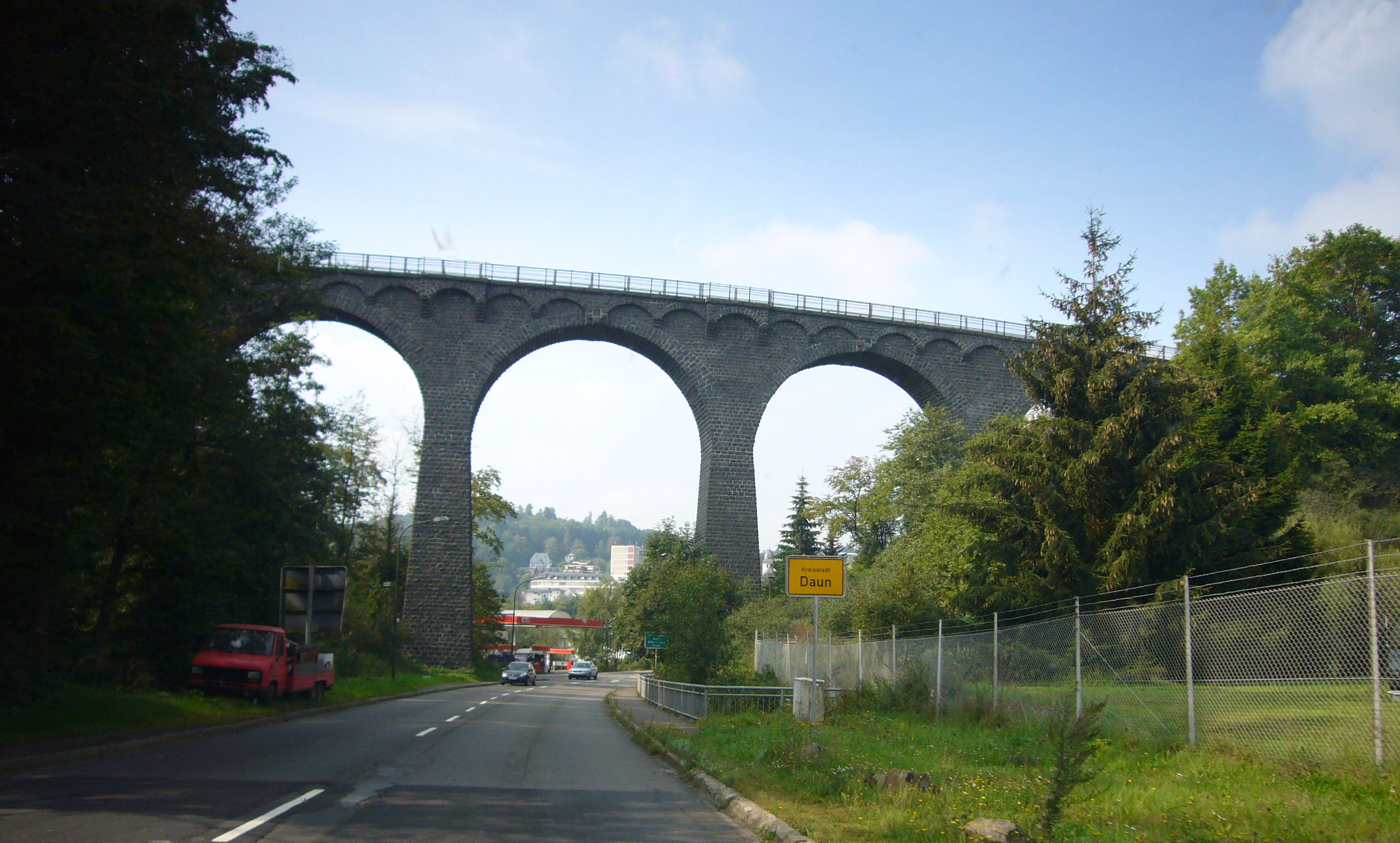
Daun, Mehrener Straße: five-arched railway viaduct

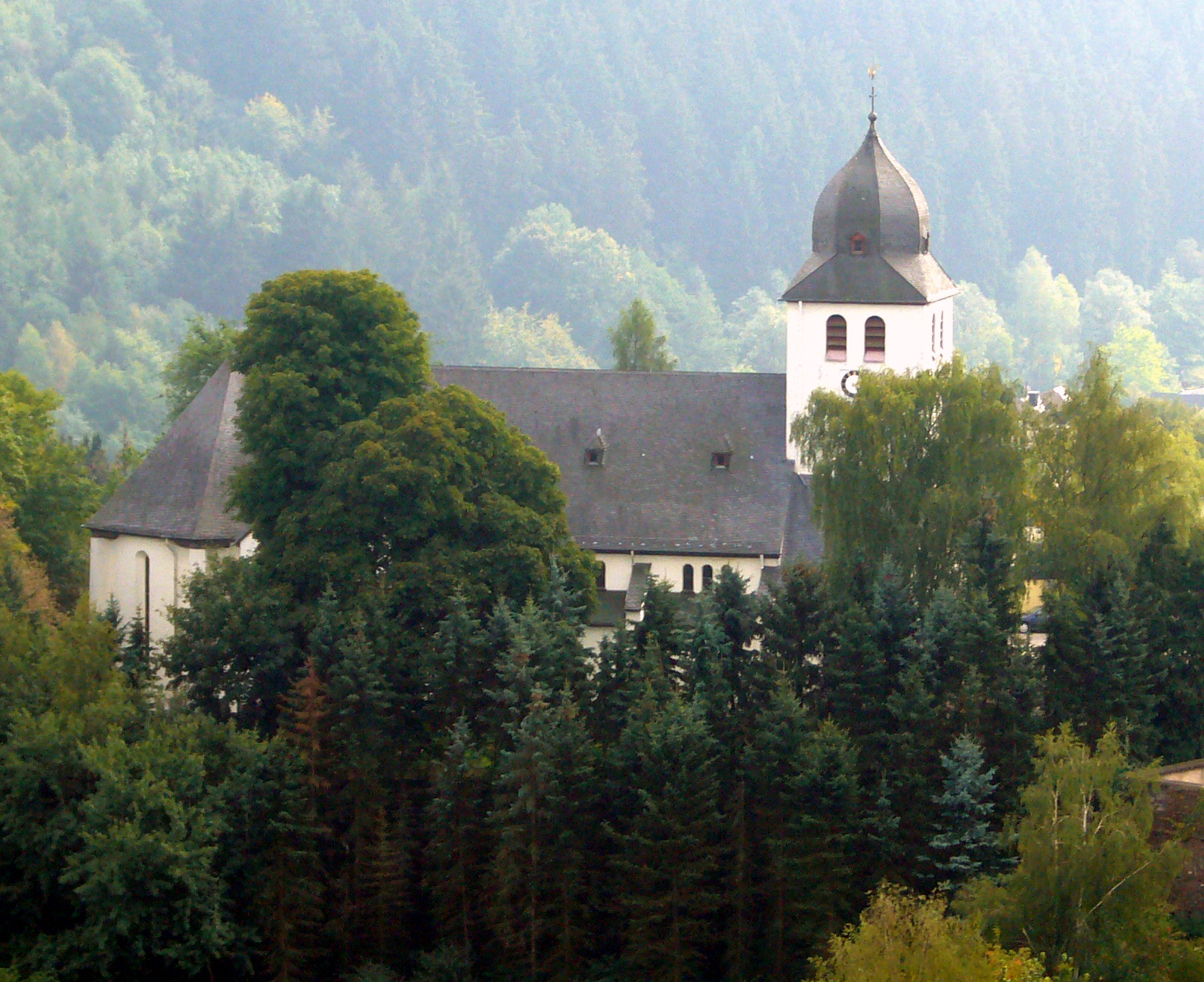
Daun, Wirichstraße: Saint Nicholas’s Catholic Parish Church

=== Museums ===
- Volcano Museum, Daun (Vulkanmuseum Daun) – about volcanic and other geological phenomena.

=== Regular events ===
- Every other year, the Krimi-Festival Tatort Eifel ("Crime Novel Festival, Crime Scene Eifel") is held in Daun, to which come notable crime fiction authors from all over German-speaking Europe. Within the framework of this festival, the Deutsche Kurzkrimi-Preis (“German Short Crime Story Prize”) is awarded.
- The St.-Laurentius-Kirmes begins each year on the Saturday after the first Wednesday in August and lasts five days. It is among the Eifel’s biggest folk festivals.
- VulkanBike Eifel-Marathon (a mountainbike marathon through the Eifel mountains, also: VulkanBike trailpark, VulkanBike extreme and VulkanBike crosscountry)
- ADAC Eifel Rallye
- Maare-Mosel-Lauf (walk)
- Flugplatzfest Ende August (“Late-August Airfield Festival”)
- Spring Festival

== Economy and infrastructure ==
=== Established businesses ===
- apra-norm Elektromechanik GmbH
- Dauner Sprudel GmbH
- TechniSat Digital GmbH
- Windspiel Manufaktur GmbH

=== Bundeswehr ===
Near Daun are the Heinrich Hertz Barracks, which house, among other units:

- Fernmeldebereich 93 (SKB; Signal Corps Division 93)
- Fernmeldeaufklärungsabschnitt 931 (SKB; Signal Intelligence section 931)
- Parts of the Bundeswehr Mayen service centre (WV)
- Daun Medical Centre (ZSan)

=== Media ===
In Daun there are an “open channel” and local editions of the Trierischer Volksfreund, the Eifelzeitung and the Wochenspiegel. Daun also has a multiplex cinema, the Kinopalast Vulkaneifel.

=== Education ===
General:

- Primary school
- Hauptschule
- Leopold-von-Daun Realschule
- Geschwister-Scholl-Gymnasium
- Thomas-Morus-Gymnasium

Vocational:

- Krankenpflegeschule Maria-Hilf (nursing)
- Fachschule für Altenpflege Maria-Hilf (geriatric care)

Special schools:

- St. Laurentius-Förderzentrum

Other schools:

- Music school
- Bildungszentrum der Bundesagentur für Arbeit (Training centre of the Federal Agency for Labour)

=== Clubs ===
Sport:

- TuS 05 Daun
- SV Neunkirchen-Steinborn
- SC Rot-Weiß Rengen
- KSC Daun-Weiersbach

=== Transport ===
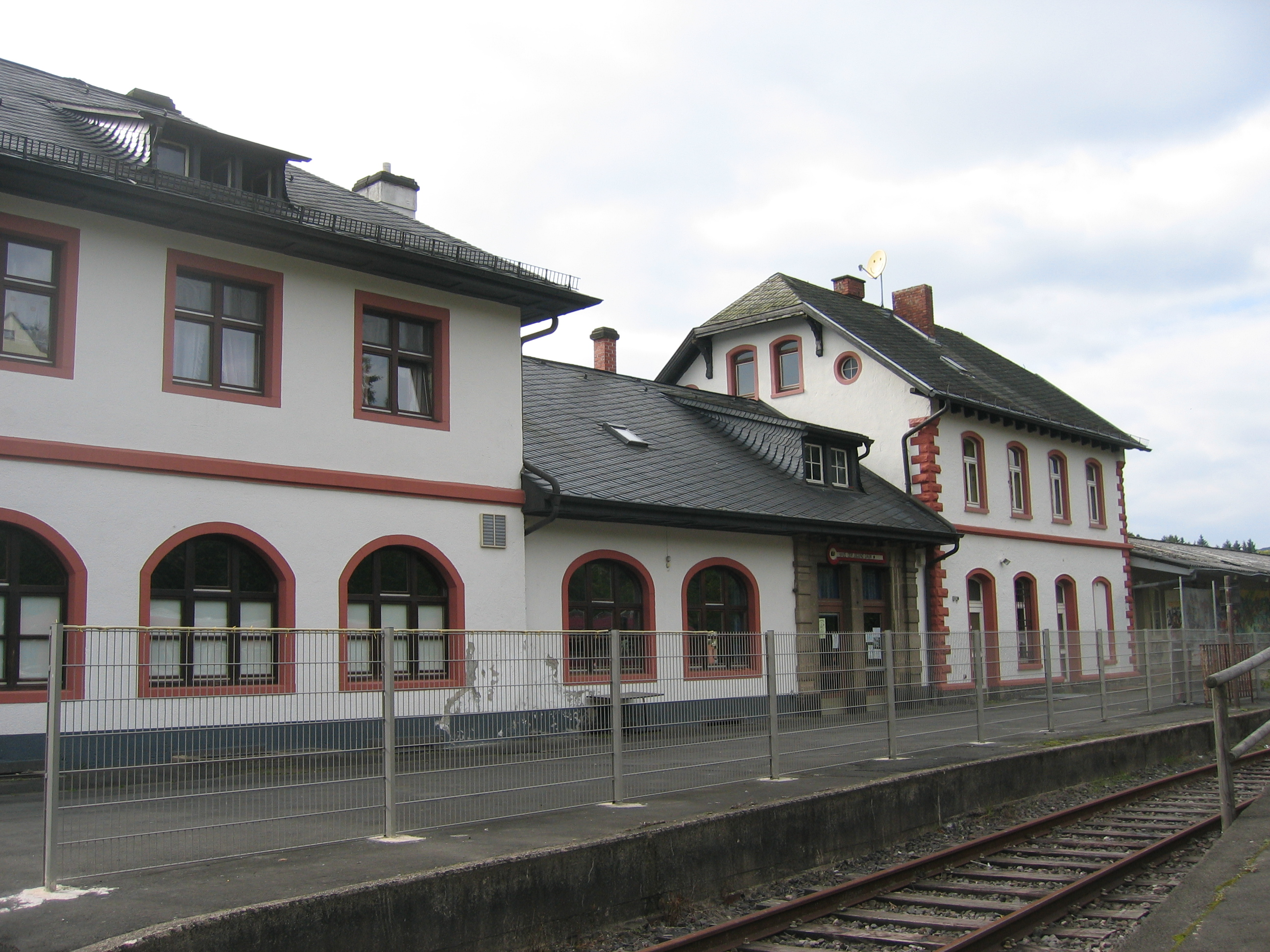
Former railway station building on the Cross Eifel Railway in Daun

Daun is linked to the Autobahn A 1. Also, Bundesstraßen 421 and 257 lead through the town. The town is linked to the railway network through the railway station on the Cross Eifel Railway (Eifelquerbahn), running from Gerolstein to Andernach, but the line is currently closed between Kaisersesch and Gerolstein, including through Daun.

== Notable people ==
- Karl Fleschen (1955– ), runner and Olympian
- Pascal "Pommes" Hens (1980– ), national handball player, handball world champion 2007
- Andreas Schäfer (1983– ), footballer
- Count Leopold Joseph von Daun (1705 – 1766), Austrian field marshal from the Holy Roman Empire noble family originating in Daun.
