= Bodenbach =

- Municipality
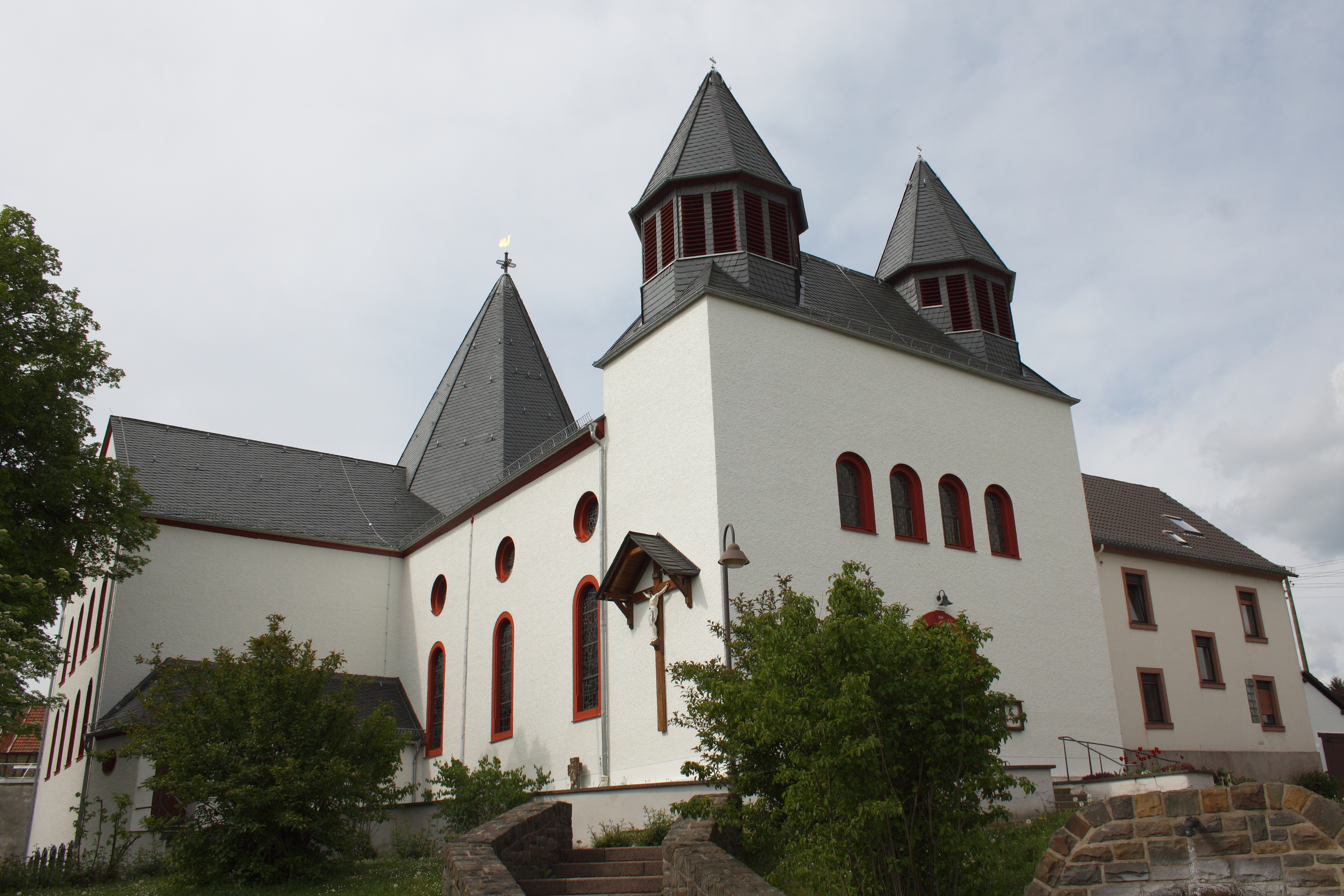
- Church of Saint Apollonia

- Coat of arms

- Location of Bodenbach within Vulkaneifel district
- Interactive map of Bodenbach
- Location within Germany Location within Rhineland-Palatinate
- Coordinates: 50°18′49″N 6°50′53″E
- Country: Germany
- State: Rhineland-Palatinate
- District: Vulkaneifel
- Municipal assoc.: Kelberg

Government
  - Mayor (2019–24): Thorsten Krämer

Area
  - Total: 4.78 km^{2} (1.85 sq mi)
- Elevation: 475 m (1,558 ft)

Population (2025-12-31)
  - Total: 193
  - Density: 40.4/km^{2} (105/sq mi)
- Time zone: UTC+01:00 (CET)
  - Summer (DST): UTC+02:00 (CEST)
- Postal codes: 53539
- Dialling codes: 02692
- Vehicle registration: DAU
- Website: www.bodenbach-eifel.de

Bodenbach is an Ortsgemeinde – a municipality belonging to a Verbandsgemeinde, a kind of collective municipality – in the Vulkaneifel district in Rhineland-Palatinate, Germany. It belongs to the Verbandsgemeinde of Kelberg, whose seat is in the like-named municipality.

== Geography ==
=== Location ===
The municipality lies in the Vulkaneifel, a part of the Eifel known for its volcanic history, geographical and geological features, and even ongoing activity today, including gases that sometimes well up from the earth.

== Politics ==
=== Municipal council ===
The council is made up of 6 council members, who were elected by majority vote at the municipal election held on 7 June 2009, and the honorary mayor as chairman.

=== Coat of arms ===
The German blazon reads: Im goldenen Schild, durch blauen Schräglinksbalken geteilt, oben eine schwarze, dreitürmige Kirche, unten ein grünes Rad mit Lindenblattspeichen.

The municipality’s arms might in English heraldic language be described thus: Or a bend sinister wavy azure, in dexter chief a church with three towers each with a conical roof sable and in base sinister a wheel spoked of eight, the spokes in the shape of lime leaves pointing away from the hub vert.

The church, a striking building with three towers, is a local landmark. The bend sinister wavy azure (that is, the slanted wavy stripe) is a canting charge meant to refer to the placename ending —bach, German for “brook” (Boden—, on the other hand, means “ground” or “bottom” – it is cognate with the latter – but there is no charge suggesting this part of the name). The spokes in the wheel, shaped like limetree leaves, stand for a very old lime (or linden) at the church, planted to commemorate the wars of liberation in 1813. The wheel itself refers to the municipality’s rural structure, while its tincture, vert (that is, green), stands for the wealth of woodland that the municipality has.

== Culture and sightseeing ==
=== Buildings ===
- Catholic church, Kirchstraße 4, Classicist aisleless church from 1829, expanded and made taller in 1950, beam cross from mid 18th century
- Hauptstraße – basalt wayside cross from 1803
- South of the village on the road to Bongard – Way of Our Lady of Sorrows, with seven stations, endowed in 1816, renewed in 1916

=== Religion ===
Bodenbach in der Eifel is the parochial seat of the parish of St. Apollonia Bodenbach to which belong the communities of Bodenbach, Bongard (branch church), Borler (chapel consecrated to Saint Bernard) and Gelenberg (Saint Wendelin’s Chapel). More than 90% of the population belongs to the Roman Catholic Church.
