= Hörschhausen =

- Municipality
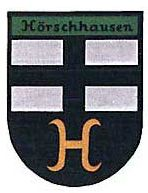
- Coat of arms

- Location of Hörschhausen within Vulkaneifel district
- Interactive map of Hörschhausen
- Location within Germany Location within Rhineland-Palatinate
- Coordinates: 50°14′39″N 6°56′13″E
- Country: Germany
- State: Rhineland-Palatinate
- District: Vulkaneifel
- Municipal assoc.: Kelberg

Government
  - Mayor (2019–24): Gerhard Wagner

Area
  - Total: 2.38 km^{2} (0.92 sq mi)
- Elevation: 456 m (1,496 ft)

Population (2025-12-31)
  - Total: 137
  - Density: 57.6/km^{2} (149/sq mi)
- Time zone: UTC+01:00 (CET)
  - Summer (DST): UTC+02:00 (CEST)
- Postal codes: 54552
- Dialling codes: 02692
- Vehicle registration: DAU
- Website: www.hoerschhausen.de

Hörschhausen is an Ortsgemeinde – a municipality belonging to a Verbandsgemeinde, a kind of collective municipality – in the Vulkaneifel district in Rhineland-Palatinate, Germany. It belongs to the Verbandsgemeinde of Kelberg, whose seat is in the like-named municipality.

== Geography ==
=== Location ===
Hörschhausen lies in the middle of the Eifel, in the Vulkan Eifel, a part of the Eifel known for its volcanic history, geographical and geological features, and even ongoing activity today, including gases that sometimes well up from the earth.

Hörschhausen lies on Bundesstraße 257 which leads to the nearest major centres, such as Kelberg and Ulmen. Nearby is the Hochkelberg (674 m above sea level).

=== Neighbouring municipalities ===
Hörschhausen’s neighbours are Katzwinkel, Ueß, Horperath, Berenbach and Utzerath.

== History ==
In 1494, Hörschhausen had its first documentary mention. In 1762, the chapel, which still stands today, was built and consecrated to Saint Apollinaris. It was built on a spot that is prone to flooding, with the Ueßbach and the Gäßbach flowing by right nearby, but it is unknown why this was done. It is believed that perhaps the chapel was built in time of drought, leading builders to overlook any danger of flooding. In 1794, Hörschhausen counted 85 inhabitants. In 1825, a fire destroyed four houses. On 21 January 1847 came the first meeting of the municipal council.

In 1851 a trove of roughly 1,800 coins, some made of silver and some of ore, from Roman times was unearthed about 565 m from Hörschhausen, under a heap of rubble while the linking road to Berenbach and on to Ulmen was being built. The coins are one of several archaeological finds made in Hörschhausen, one of the richest archaeological sites in the Verbandsgemeinde of Kelberg, in the Landesmuseum Trier. In 1852, the remains of a Roman settlement were found.

In 1895, Hörschhausen was linked to the Eifelquerbahn (Cross Eifel Railway) network through the neighbouring village of Utzerath. In 1920, the bakehouse was built on what is now Mühlenweg (street). In 1939, an old relic from a bygone age, the tithe barn, burnt down. Ten years later, in 1949, the volunteer fire brigade was founded. In 1952, the water supply was ensured.

In 1988, a new parish hall was built. In 1989, Hörschhausen became the finishing place in a stage of the campaign Eine wandernde Flagge für Europa (“A roaming flag for Europe”). In 1996, the bakehouse was torn down.

== Politics ==
=== Municipal council ===
The council is made up of 6 council members, who were elected by majority vote at the municipal election held on 7 June 2009, and the honorary mayor as chairman.

=== Mayor ===
Hörschhausen’s mayor is Gerhard Wagner.

=== Coat of arms ===
The German blazon reads: In silbern über schwarz geteiltem Schilde oben ein schwarzes Balkenkreuz, unten ein goldener Hausanker in Form des Buchstabens H.

The municipality’s arms might in English heraldic language be described thus: Per fess argent a cross sable and sable an H-shaped wall brace Or.

In the early 1950s, the Amt of Daun put forth a proposal to the Koblenz-Ehrenbreitstein State Archive for a few municipalities, among them Hörschhausen, for designs for coats of arms. Since no older seals or coats of arms were known, the designs were authorized. Nevertheless, it was not until 1980 that approval was granted for Hörschhausen to bear arms, and it had not been until 1979 that the application had even been submitted to the Regierungsbezirk administration in Trier.

Until the end of feudal times, Hörschhausen was an Electoral-Cologne holding, and the Cross of Cologne in the upper half of the escutcheon recalls this time. The gold H-shaped wall brace stands for both the municipality’s name, and the placename ending —hausen.

The arms have been borne since 6 February 1980.

== Culture and sightseeing ==
=== Buildings ===
- Catholic branch church, Dauner Straße 1, biaxial aisleless church, apparently from 1762.
