= Gunderath =

- Municipality
- Coat of arms

- Location of Gunderath within Vulkaneifel district
- Interactive map of Gunderath
- Location within Germany Location within Rhineland-Palatinate
- Coordinates: 50°15′18″N 6°58′54″E
- Country: Germany
- State: Rhineland-Palatinate
- District: Vulkaneifel
- Municipal assoc.: Kelberg

Government
  - Mayor (2019–24): Nick Radermacher

Area
  - Total: 1.29 km^{2} (0.50 sq mi)
- Elevation: 450 m (1,480 ft)

Population (2025-12-31)
  - Total: 128
  - Density: 99.2/km^{2} (257/sq mi)
- Time zone: UTC+01:00 (CET)
  - Summer (DST): UTC+02:00 (CEST)
- Postal codes: 56767
- Dialling codes: 02657
- Vehicle registration: DAU
- Website: www.gunderath.de

Gunderath is an Ortsgemeinde – a municipality belonging to a Verbandsgemeinde, a kind of collective municipality – in the Vulkaneifel district in Rhineland-Palatinate, Germany. It belongs to the Verbandsgemeinde of Kelberg, whose seat is in the like-named municipality.

== Geography ==
The municipality lies 12 km from Daun and 20 km from Mayen in the Vulkaneifel, a part of the Eifel known for its volcanic history, geographical and geological features, and even ongoing activity today, including gases that sometimes well up from the earth.

== History ==
The placename points to the village having its beginnings in the late clearing phase of Carolingian times. Until 1794, Gunderath belonged to the Amt of Nürburg in the Electorate of Cologne. Under Prussian administration, Gunderath became a municipality in the Bürgermeisterei (“Mayoralty”) of Kelberg in the Adenau district. In the course of municipal reform in 1970, Gunderath passed together with the other municipalities in the Amt of Kelberg to the Daun district, now known as the Vulkaneifel district.

== Politics ==
=== Municipal council ===
The council is made up of 6 council members, who were elected by majority vote at the municipal election held on 7 June 2009, and the honorary mayor as chairman.

=== Mayor ===
Gunderath's mayor is Nick Radermacher.

=== Coat of arms ===
The German blazon reads: Von Silber über Schwarz geteilt, oben ein schwarzes Balkenkreuz, unten ein silberner, goldbewehrter Habicht, den rechten Fang erhoben.

The municipality's arms might in English heraldic language be described thus: Per fess argent a cross sable and sable a hawk with wings endorsed of the first armed Or, the dexter talon raised.

Until the end of feudal times, Gunderath was an Electoral-Cologne holding, and the Cross of Cologne in the upper half of the escutcheon recalls this time. The hawk is Saint Quirinus's attribute and is thus a reference to the village's and the church's patron saint.

== Culture and sightseeing ==
Buildings:

- Catholic branch church, Kirchstraße 8, biaxial aisleless church, 1740.
- Haus Bergkrone, south of the village on the road to Uersfeld, two-dwelling house, representative mansard roof building, basalt, from 1921, west of and above the Bergkrone baryte mine from about 1898, originally several timber-frame buildings and a headframe.
