= Katzwinkel, Vulkaneifel =

Katzwinkel
- Municipality
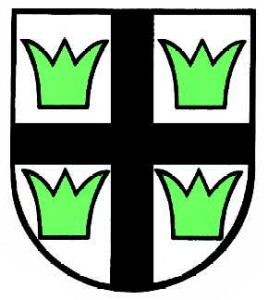
- Coat of arms

- Location of Katzwinkel within Vulkaneifel district
- Interactive map of Katzwinkel
- Location within Germany Location within Rhineland-Palatinate
- Coordinates: 50°15′00″N 6°55′27″E
- Country: Germany
- State: Rhineland-Palatinate
- District: Vulkaneifel
- Municipal assoc.: Kelberg

Government
  - Mayor (2019–24): Manfred Lenartz

Area
  - Total: 3.85 km^{2} (1.49 sq mi)
- Elevation: 480 m (1,570 ft)

Population (2025-12-31)
  - Total: 138
  - Density: 35.8/km^{2} (92.8/sq mi)
- Time zone: UTC+01:00 (CET)
  - Summer (DST): UTC+02:00 (CEST)
- Postal codes: 54552
- Dialling codes: 02692
- Vehicle registration: DAU
- Website: www.Katzwinkel-Eifel.de

Katzwinkel (German pronunciation: [ˈkatsˌvɪŋkl̩]) is an Ortsgemeinde – a municipality belonging to a Verbandsgemeinde, a kind of collective municipality – in the Vulkaneifel district in Rhineland-Palatinate, Germany. It belongs to the Verbandsgemeinde of Kelberg, whose seat is in the like-named municipality.

== Geography ==
The municipality lies in the Vulkaneifel, a part of the Eifel known for its volcanic history, geographical and geological features, and even ongoing activity today, including gases that sometimes well up from the earth.

Katzwinkel lies in the Gäsbach valley stretching up from the upper Üßbach’s right bank, just under 500 m west of Bundesstraße 257 between Kelberg and Ulmen. The municipality lies at the forks of three brooks, the Burbach, the Lanzbach and the Ringelbach, which together form the Gäsbach in the middle of the village. The village’s population is roughly 180 and its elevation ranges from 460 to 490 m above sea level; however, if areas outside the village but still within municipal limits are considered, the local mountain, the Staudchen, northeast of the village, reaches a height of 524 m above sea level. At the Afelskreuz (see Culture and sightseeing below), the 600 m above sea level mark is almost reached. The area within municipal limits measures 385 ha, and one third of it is wooded.

== History ==
Stone Age Finds brought to light here confirm prehistoric settlement in the area around Katzwinkel. The first documentary mention from 1143 shows that the Springiersbach Monastery had holdings in Katzwinkel.

Katzwinkel later belonged to the County of Nürburg and the Amt of Nürburg, and thereby also to the Electorate of Cologne. In the time of French occupation under Napoleon, Katzwinkel was assigned to the Mairie ("Mayoralty") of Sarmersbach in the canton of Daun. After this arrangement was abolished in 1815, the village remained with the Bürgermeisterei (also "Mayoralty") of Sarmersbach until 1931.

Until 1970, the municipality belonged to the Verbandsgemeinde of Daun, when it, along with Beinhausen, Boxberg, Brück, Hörschhausen and Neichen, was annexed to the Verbandsgemeinde of Kelberg.

== Politics ==
=== Municipal council ===
The council is made up of 6 council members, who were elected by majority vote at the municipal election held on 7 June 2009, and the honorary mayor as chairman.

=== Mayor ===
Katzwinkel's mayor is Manfred Lenartz, and his deputy is Guido Lenartz.

=== Coat of arms ===
The German blazon reads: In Silber ein schwarzes Balkenkreuz, bewinkelt von vier grünen dreizackigen Kronen.

The municipality's arms might in English heraldic language be described thus: Argent a cross sable between four cronels vert.

The black cross on a silver field is the arms formerly borne by the village's feudal overlord, the Electorate of Cologne, to which, of the formerly 98 municipalities in the district, only Katzwinkel and Hörschhausen belonged. The cross has what is described in the German blazon as "green, three-spiked crowns" (…grünen dreizackigen Kronen), although they more closely resemble a charge known as a cronel, set in each of its angles. The cronels are a clever kind of canting. In German heraldry, the term for the arrangement of four like charges around a cross in this fashion is bewinkelt, thus suggesting part of the name Katzwinkel (the name ending actually means "corner", "angle" or, as in this case, "place framed by hills and mountains").

== Culture and sightseeing ==
=== Buildings ===
Worth seeing in Katzwinkel is the Afelskreuz (cross) with its chapel. The name may come from Ablasskreuz ("Indulgence Cross"), although it is also possible, given the very similar pronunciation, that it came from Eifelkreuz ("Eifel Cross"). The more than 3 m-tall cross that stands here now was put up on the same spot as an older, rotten one in 1931. The year carved into the cross, 1231, refers to pilgrimages made at that time.

Two other buildings are listed as part of the municipality's cultural heritage:

- Saint Catherine's Catholic Church (branch church; Filialkirche St. Katharina), Baumschulstraße 4, triaxial aisleless church, 1810, altered about 1950-1960.
- Heiligenhäuschen (a small, shrinelike structure consecrated to a saint or saints), east of the village on the road to Ueß.

=== Natural monuments ===
The Teufelsstein ("Devil’s Stone") with a diameter of 2 m is a listed natural monument made of solidified lava.

== Economy and infrastructure ==
The village is characterized by agriculture and currently has four full-time businesses in the field, mainly in pasture and cattle raising.

=== Trails ===
Katzwinkel is linked to the Eifel’s network of hiking trails by the Eifel Club's Karl Kaufmann Way (Hauptwanderweg Nr. 2), roughly 1 500 m of which runs through the municipal area. There are also about 7.5 km of municipal hiking trails. Katzwinkel is also linked to the cycle path network with the Ahr-Mosel Radweg and Radweg Nr. 30.

The nearby municipalities of Kelberg and Ulmen, each about 5 km away, are the local centres for shopping and medical services. They also have pharmacies. Both neighbouring centres can be reached over Bundesstraße 257.

== Sundry ==
In 2005, Katzwinkel won a prize from the state of Rhineland-Palatinate for outstanding municipal projects. Of the 97 projects sent in, Katzwinkel's initiative placed seventh.
