= Brücktal =

- Municipality
- Coat of arms

- Location of Brücktal within Vulkaneifel district
- Interactive map of Brücktal
- Location within Germany Location within Rhineland-Palatinate
- Coordinates: 50°19′09″N 6°58′49″E
- Country: Germany
- State: Rhineland-Palatinate
- District: Vulkaneifel
- Municipal assoc.: Kelberg

Government
  - Mayor (2019–24): Werner Schumacher

Area
  - Total: 2.42 km^{2} (0.93 sq mi)
- Elevation: 470 m (1,540 ft)

Population (2025-12-31)
  - Total: 86
  - Density: 36/km^{2} (92/sq mi)
- Time zone: UTC+01:00 (CET)
  - Summer (DST): UTC+02:00 (CEST)
- Postal codes: 53539
- Dialling codes: 02692
- Vehicle registration: DAU
- Website: www.bruecktal.de

Brücktal is an Ortsgemeinde – a municipality belonging to a Verbandsgemeinde, a kind of collective municipality – in the Vulkaneifel district in Rhineland-Palatinate, Germany. It belongs to the Verbandsgemeinde of Kelberg, whose seat is in the like-named municipality.

== Geography ==
The municipality lies at the forks where the brooks Winsbach, Welcheratherbach and Nitzbach all flow together in the Vulkaneifel, a part of the Eifel known for its volcanic history, geographical and geological features, and even ongoing activity today, including gases that sometimes well up from the earth. Brücktal lies some 20 km northeast of the district seat of Daun.

== History ==
The village originally bore the name Brück. The placename comes from a bridge (Brücke in German) that once spanned the Nitzbach here. In the Middle Ages, Brücktal belonged, as a legacy of the Counts of Are-Hochstaden, to the Electoral-Cologne Amt of Nürburg, and in Napoleonic times to the Mairie (“Mayoralty”) of Nürburg.

In the course of administrative restructuring in Rhineland-Palatinate, the municipality passed in 1970 from the Adenau district to the Daun district, which has since been given the name Vulkaneifel.

The municipality itself also underwent a name change on 1 January 1971, when it shed the old name Brück and became Brücktal.

== Politics ==
=== Municipal council ===
The council is made up of 6 council members, who were elected by majority vote at the municipal election held on 7 June 2009, and the honorary mayor as chairman.

=== Coat of arms ===
The German blazon reads: In Silber eine blaue Wellenpfahldeichsel, bedeckt von einer gezinnten einbogigen Brücke.

The municipality’s arms might in English heraldic language be described thus: Argent a pall wavy with a third arm palewise azure surmounted in fess abased by an arched bridge embattled of five gules.

The unusual pall in these arms – the two diagonal arms alone are far more usual and a pall is seldom wavy – symbolizes the three brooks that meet in the municipality. The bridge is a canting charge for the municipality’s name, originally Brück (while the word for bridge is the very similar Brücke).

== Culture and sightseeing ==
=== Buildings ===
- Catholic branch church, Kapellenweg, biaxial aisleless church, basalt shaft cross, both from 1733
- Hauptstraße – wayside cross, a basalt shaft cross from the mid 18th century
- Wayside cross, west of the village on the road to Welcherath, a basalt beam cross from 1728
