= Sassen =

Sassen could refer to:

- Maan Sassen, Dutch politician
- Saskia Sassen, Dutch-American sociologist and economist
- Willem Sassen, Dutch Nazi collaborator and journalist who interviewed Adolf Eichmann
- Sassen, Germany, municipality in Rhineland-Palatinate, Germany
- German name for Sasna, territory in Old Prussia
