= Kötterichen =

- Municipality
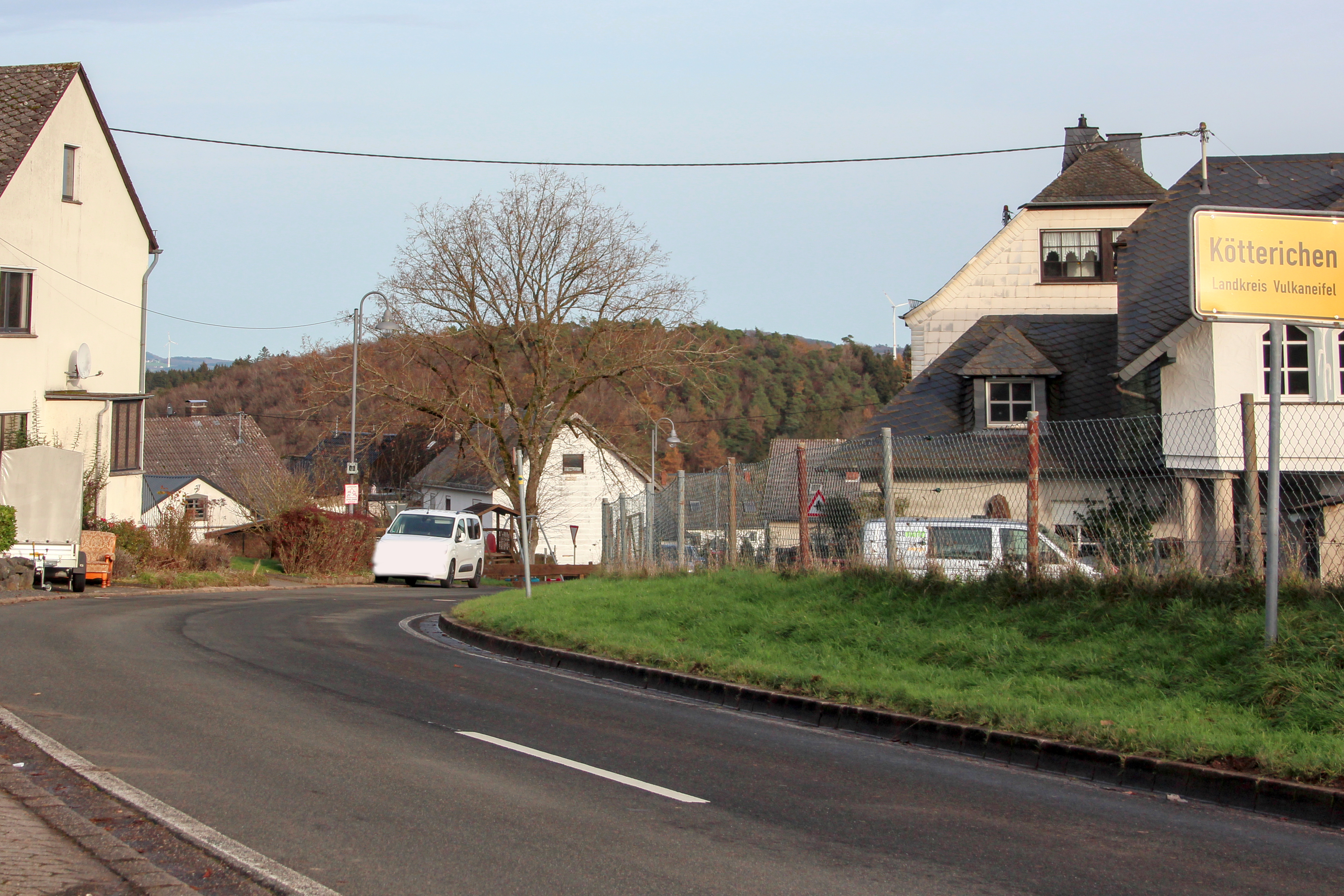

- Coat of arms

- Location of Kötterichen within Vulkaneifel district
- Interactive map of Kötterichen
- Location within Germany Location within Rhineland-Palatinate
- Coordinates: 50°14′26″N 6°59′08″E
- Country: Germany
- State: Rhineland-Palatinate
- District: Vulkaneifel
- Municipal assoc.: Kelberg

Government
  - Mayor (2019–24): Franz-Josef Jax

Area
  - Total: 1.31 km^{2} (0.51 sq mi)
- Elevation: 500 m (1,600 ft)

Population (2025-12-31)
  - Total: 120
  - Density: 92/km^{2} (240/sq mi)
- Time zone: UTC+01:00 (CET)
  - Summer (DST): UTC+02:00 (CEST)
- Postal codes: 56767
- Dialling codes: 02657
- Vehicle registration: DAU
- Website: www.koetterichen.de

Kötterichen is an Ortsgemeinde – a municipality belonging to a Verbandsgemeinde, a kind of collective municipality – in the Vulkaneifel district in Rhineland-Palatinate, Germany. It belongs to the Verbandsgemeinde of Kelberg, whose seat is in the like-named municipality.

== Geography ==
The municipality lies in the Vulkaneifel, a part of the Eifel known for its volcanic history, geographical and geological features, and even ongoing activity today, including gases that sometimes well up from the earth.

== History ==
In the Middle Ages, the village belonged to the Electoral-Cologne Schultheißenamt of Uersfeld. In 1794, the village belonged to the Electoral-Trier Amt of Daun. Under Prussian administration, Kötterichen belonged to the Amt of Kelberg in the Adenau district. In the course of administrative restructuring in Rhineland-Palatinate in 1970, the municipality passed to the newly formed Verbandsgemeinde of Kelberg.

== Politics ==
=== Municipal council ===
The council is made up of 6 council members, who were elected by majority vote at the municipal election held on 7 June 2009, and the honorary mayor as chairman.

=== Mayor ===
Kötterichen’s mayor is Franz-Josef Jax.

=== Coat of arms ===
The German blazon reads: Schild halbrechts und schräglinks geteilt, oben in Gold eine rote Lilie, vorne in Rot ein silberner Kelch, daneben links ein goldener Wecken, hinten in Blau ein aufgerichtetes goldenes Schwert, links daneben ein stehender goldener Bischofsstab.

The municipality’s arms might in English heraldic language be described thus: Per bend sinister, dexter per bend Or a fleur-de-lis gules and gules a chalice argent and to sinister a bun of the first, sinister azure a sword and a bishop’s staff in fess, both palewise and of the first.

The lily, as a Marian symbol, refers to the Marienkapelle (chapel). The chalice and the bun, symbols of the inn, recall the first documentary mention, the estate owner and innkeeper Michel. The sword and bishop’s staff, charges taken from the Ueß-Uersfeld court seal, refer to the time when Kötterichen belonged to Uersfeld, and to the nearby gallows for the high court of the Electoral-Cologne Schultheißenamt of Uersfeld.

== Culture and sightseeing ==
Buildings:

- Kirchstraße – chapel, small plastered building, about 1800.
- Hauptstraße (no number) – former communal bakehouse, one-floor timber-frame building, 19th century.
