= Kolverath =

- Municipality
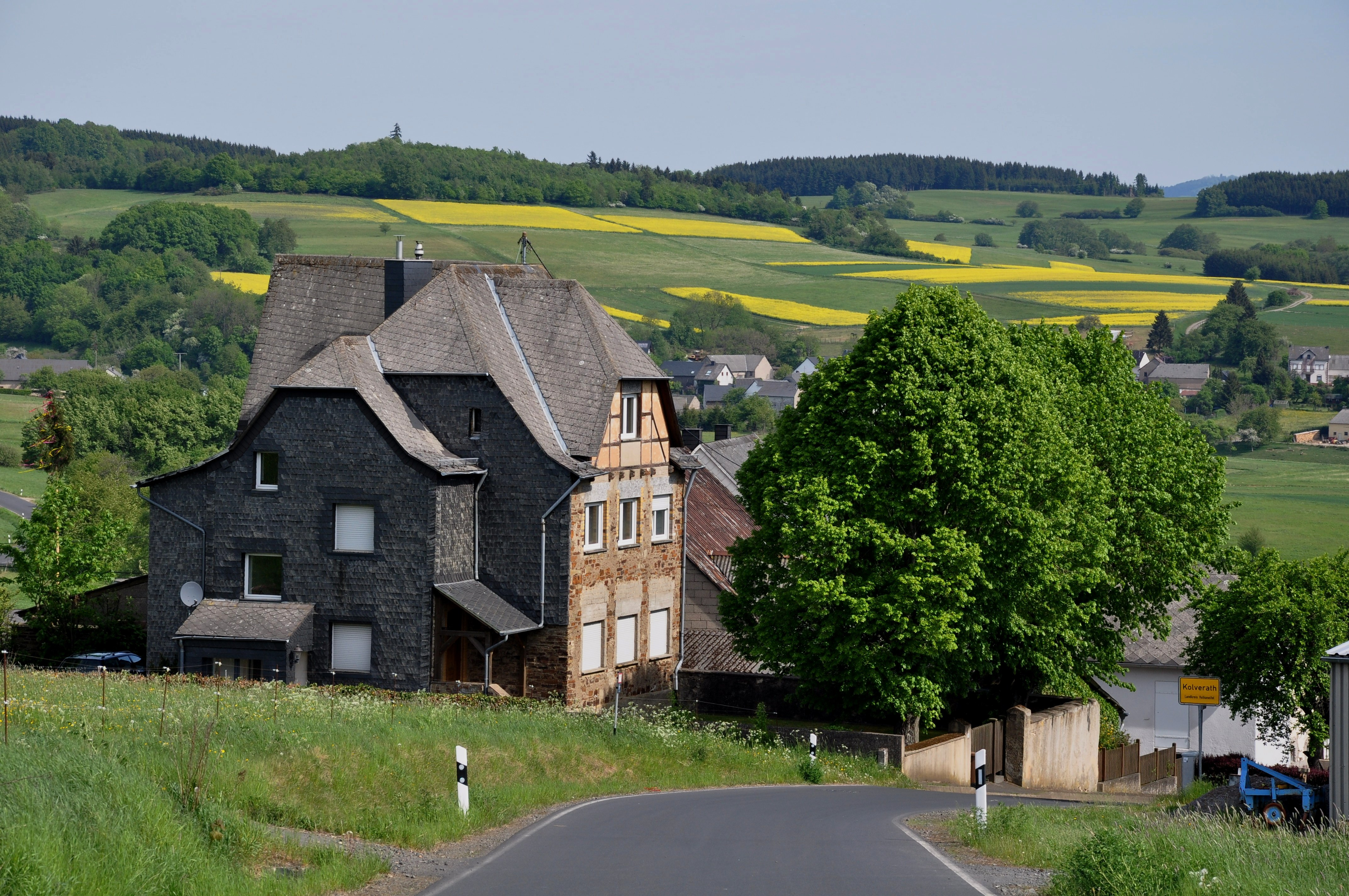

- Coat of arms

- Location of Kolverath within Vulkaneifel district
- Interactive map of Kolverath
- Location within Germany Location within Rhineland-Palatinate
- Coordinates: 50°16′20″N 6°58′20″E
- Country: Germany
- State: Rhineland-Palatinate
- District: Vulkaneifel
- Municipal assoc.: Kelberg

Government
  - Mayor (2019–24): Jürgen Jax

Area
  - Total: 2.46 km^{2} (0.95 sq mi)
- Elevation: 525 m (1,722 ft)

Population (2025-12-31)
  - Total: 94
  - Density: 38/km^{2} (99/sq mi)
- Time zone: UTC+01:00 (CET)
  - Summer (DST): UTC+02:00 (CEST)
- Postal codes: 56767
- Dialling codes: 02692
- Vehicle registration: DAU
- Website: www.kolverath.de

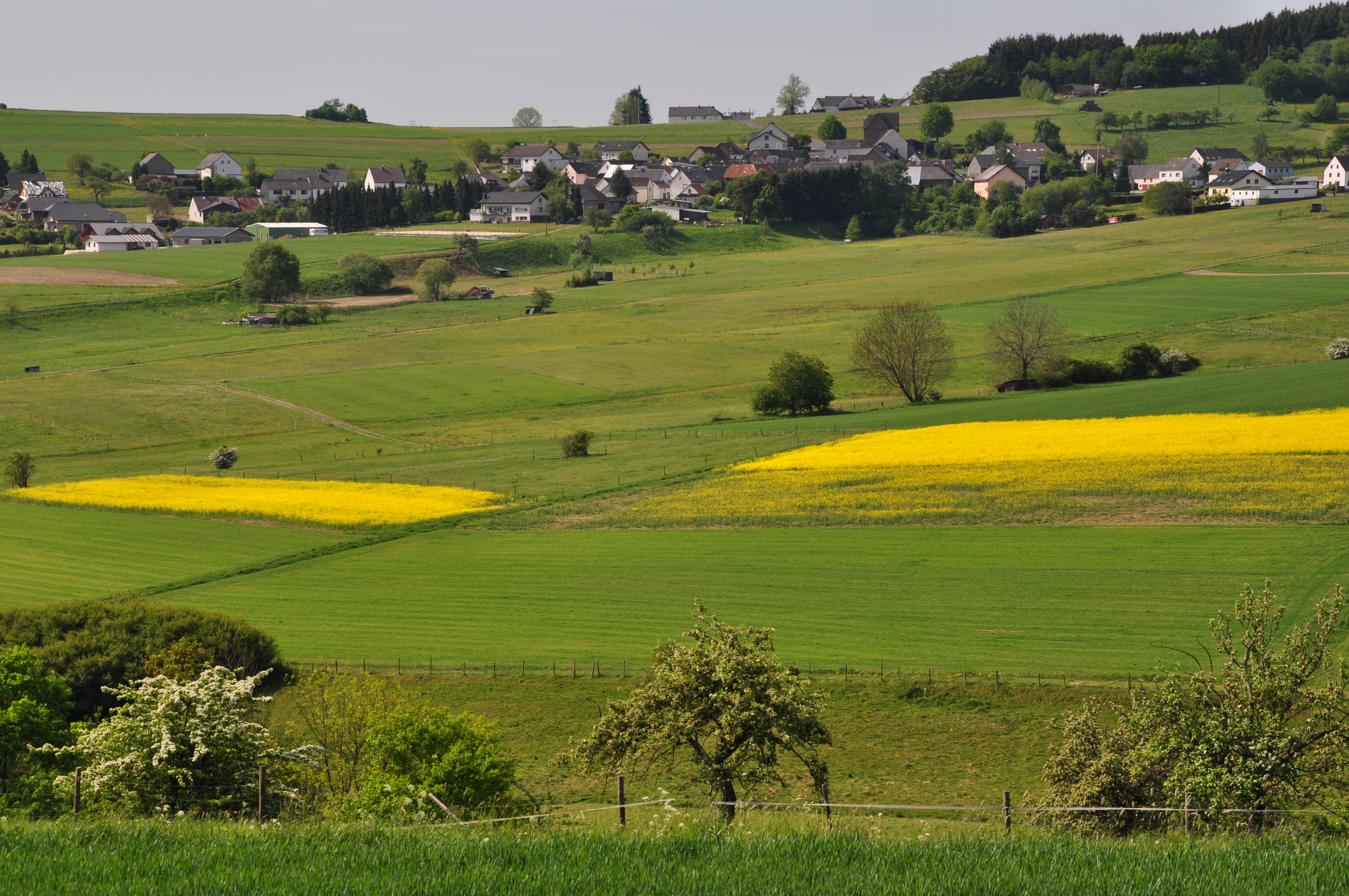
Kolverath seen from neighbouring Bereborn.

Kolverath is an Ortsgemeinde – a municipality belonging to a Verbandsgemeinde, a kind of collective municipality – in the Vulkaneifel district in Rhineland-Palatinate, Germany. It belongs to the Verbandsgemeinde of Kelberg, whose seat is in the like-named municipality.

== Geography ==
The municipality lies in the Vulkaneifel, a part of the Eifel known for its volcanic history, geographical and geological features, and even ongoing activity today, including gases that sometimes well up from the earth.

== Politics ==
=== Municipal council ===
The council is made up of 6 council members, who were elected by majority vote at the municipal election held on 7 June 2009, and the honorary mayor as chairman.

=== Mayor ===
Kolverath’s mayor is Jürgen Jax.

=== Coat of arms ===
The German blazon reads: In Gold eine eingebogene, grüne Spitze, darin ein goldenes Rad; vorn eine aufrechte rote Zange, hinten ein fünfstrahliger roter Stern.

The municipality’s arms might in English heraldic language be described thus: Tierced in mantle, dexter Or a pair of tongs palewise gules, sinister Or a mullet of five of the second and in base vert a wheel spoked of eight of the first.

The tongs are Saint Apollonia’s attribute, thus representing the municipality’s patron saint. The red mullet of five (five-pointed star) refers to the founder of the estate of Kolverath, first mentioned in 1324, Friedrich von Daun, called Colver. He bore in his arms a charge of three mullets with the Daun “fretty” pattern (see Daun’s coat of arms) and he gave the village its name. The division of the field is taken to represent the Hochkelberg upon which, legend has it, a golden wagon is buried. The gold wheel in base stands for this.

== Culture and sightseeing ==
Buildings:

- Saint Apollonia’s Catholic Church (branch church; Filialkirche St. Apollonia), Hauptstraße, small aisleless church from 1775.
- Hauptstraße 12 – estate along street from 1878.

== Economy and infrastructure ==
Kolverath lies 3 km south of Bundesstraße 410 (Gerolstein–Mayen). The nearest railway station is Monreal on the Eifelquerbahn (Cross Eifel Railway”; Kaisersesch–Andernach), some 17 km to the east.
