= Oberelz =

- Municipality
- Coat of arms

- Location of Oberelz within Vulkaneifel district
- Interactive map of Oberelz
- Location within Germany Location within Rhineland-Palatinate
- Coordinates: 50°15′58.33″N 7°3′2.99″E
- Country: Germany
- State: Rhineland-Palatinate
- District: Vulkaneifel
- Municipal assoc.: Kelberg

Government
  - Mayor (2019–24): Albert Grohnert

Area
  - Total: 5.55 km^{2} (2.14 sq mi)
- Elevation: 380 m (1,250 ft)

Population (2025-12-31)
  - Total: 119
  - Density: 21.4/km^{2} (55.5/sq mi)
- Time zone: UTC+01:00 (CET)
  - Summer (DST): UTC+02:00 (CEST)
- Postal codes: 56767
- Dialling codes: 02657
- Vehicle registration: DAU
- Website: www.oberelz.de

Oberelz is an Ortsgemeinde – a municipality belonging to a Verbandsgemeinde, a kind of collective municipality – in the Vulkaneifel district in Rhineland-Palatinate, Germany. It belongs to the Verbandsgemeinde of Kelberg, whose seat is in the like-named municipality.

== Geography ==
The municipality is located in the Vulkaneifel region, a sub-region of the Eifel known for its volcanic history, distinctive geographical and geological features, and ongoing volcanic activity. This includes gases that occasionally emerge from the earth.

== History ==
The village was mentioned in 1336 as Eltze. The name comes from the municipality's location in the headwaters of the river Elzbach, which empties into the Moselle near Moselkern. In feudal times, Oberelz belonged to the County of Virneburg. Under Prussian administration it was a municipality in the Bürgermeisterei (“Mayoralty”) of Kelberg in the Adenau district. In the course of administrative restructuring in Rhineland-Palatinate in 1970, the municipality, along with the others in the Amt of Kelberg, was assigned to the Daun district, which has since been given the name Vulkaneifel.

== Politics ==
=== Municipal council ===
The council has six members, chosen by majority vote at the municipal election held on 7 June 2009, with the honorary mayor as chairman.

=== Mayor ===
Oberelz's mayor is Albert Grohnert.

=== Coat of arms ===
The German blazon reads: Von Gold vor Rot durch Wellenschnitt geteilt, vorn 7 (4:3) zu 2 Balken aneinandergereihte rote Rauten, hinten 3 (1:1:1) goldene Kugeln.

The municipality's arms might in English heraldic language be described thus: Per bend sinister wavy, Or seven lozenges gules, four and three, and gules three bezants, two in bend sinister and one in base sinister.

The former mediaeval lord's arms are seen as a charge on the dexter (armsbearer's right, viewer's left) side. The seven lozenges were borne by the Counts of Virneburg; their arms can also be seen locally at the chapel, on the vault’s keystone. The three bezants (golden disks, or in this case balls or orbs, as the German blazon has it) are Saint Nicholas’s attribute, thus representing the municipality’s and the church’s patron saint. The line of partition, “per bend sinister wavy”, represents the river Elzbach.

== Culture and sightseeing ==
Buildings:

- Saint Nicholas’s Catholic Church (branch church; Filialkirche St. Nikolaus), Hauptstraße – aisleless church 1750.
- Wayside chapel, west of the village in the woods at the “Beutelstälchen” municipal limit – plastered building, partly timber-frame, from 1823.
