= Kirsbach =

- Municipality
- Coat of arms

- Location of Kirsbach within Vulkaneifel district
- Interactive map of Kirsbach
- Location within Germany Location within Rhineland-Palatinate
- Coordinates: 50°19′33″N 6°59′35″E
- Country: Germany
- State: Rhineland-Palatinate
- District: Vulkaneifel
- Municipal assoc.: Kelberg

Government
  - Mayor (2019–24): Alois Königs

Area
  - Total: 3.41 km^{2} (1.32 sq mi)
- Elevation: 480 m (1,570 ft)

Population (2025-12-31)
  - Total: 72
  - Density: 21/km^{2} (55/sq mi)
- Time zone: UTC+01:00 (CET)
  - Summer (DST): UTC+02:00 (CEST)
- Postal codes: 53539
- Dialling codes: 02692
- Vehicle registration: DAU
- Website: www.kirsbach.de

Kirsbach is an Ortsgemeinde – a municipality belonging to a Verbandsgemeinde, a kind of collective municipality – in the Vulkaneifel district in Rhineland-Palatinate, Germany. It belongs to the Verbandsgemeinde of Kelberg, whose seat is in the like-named municipality.

== Geography ==
The municipality lies in the Vulkaneifel, a part of the Eifel known for its volcanic history, geographical and geological features, and even ongoing activity today, including gases that sometimes well up from the earth.

== History ==
Kirsbach has no village chronicle, but it is known that in 1680, it had its first documentary mention. The chapel is the first place of worship in the municipality, and was built in the mid-1920s.

== Politics ==
=== Municipal council ===
The council is made up of 6 council members, who were elected by majority vote at the municipal election held on 7 June 2009, and the honorary mayor as chairman.

=== Mayor ===
Kirsbach's mayor is Alois Königs, and his deputy is Willi Krebsbach.

=== Coat of arms ===
The German blazon reads: Von Silber über Schwarz geteilt, oben ein durchgehendes schwarzes Kreuz, unten ein silberner Winkel mit silberner, goldgeschäfteter Axt gekreuzt.

The municipality's arms might in English heraldic language be described thus: Per fess argent a cross sable and sable a square of the first and an axe of the first helved Or per saltire, the former bendwise surmounting the latter.

From feudal times until about 1803, Kirsbach belonged as part of the Amt of Nürburg and the Schultheisserei of Welcherath to the Electorate of Cologne, whose arms were argent a cross sable (that is, a silver shield with a black cross), now also seen above the line of partition in Kirsbach's arms, and indeed in other municipalities’ arms in the Vulkaneifel district. Below the line of partition are a carpenter's square and an axe crossed in an X-shape (“per saltire”), and being carpenter's tools, they are held to refer to Saint Joseph, the municipality's and the church's patron saint, according to a message from the mayor. The tinctures sable and argent (black and silver) are also a reference to the former Electoral-Cologne hegemony.

== Culture and sightseeing ==
=== Buildings ===
- Catholic church, Baroque Revival quarrystone aisleless church, 1920/1930.
