= Ueß =

- Municipality
- Coat of arms

- Location of Ueß within Vulkaneifel district
- Interactive map of Ueß
- Location within Germany Location within Rhineland-Palatinate
- Coordinates: 50°15′22″N 6°56′18″E
- Country: Germany
- State: Rhineland-Palatinate
- District: Vulkaneifel
- Municipal assoc.: Kelberg

Government
  - Mayor (2019–24): Achim Maas

Area
  - Total: 1.49 km^{2} (0.58 sq mi)
- Elevation: 490 m (1,610 ft)

Population (2025-12-31)
  - Total: 61
  - Density: 41/km^{2} (110/sq mi)
- Time zone: UTC+01:00 (CET)
  - Summer (DST): UTC+02:00 (CEST)
- Postal codes: 56767
- Dialling codes: 02692
- Vehicle registration: DAU

Ueß (or Uess) is an Ortsgemeinde – a municipality belonging to a Verbandsgemeinde, a kind of collective municipality – in the Vulkaneifel district in Rhineland-Palatinate, Germany. It belongs to the Verbandsgemeinde of Kelberg, whose seat is in the like-named municipality.

== Geography ==
The municipality lies in the Vulkaneifel, a part of the Eifel known for its volcanic history, geographical and geological features, and even ongoing activity today, including gases that sometimes well up from the earth.

Ueß lies on the Üßbach stream and also exactly between Mosbruch and Hörschhausen.

== History ==
In 1103, history tells of an estate named Husenrode (now called Hauroth) with its outlying appurtenances, Zusse (derived from zu Usse, meaning “at Uss”), Berbenbac (Berenbach) and Lupah (Laubach). In December 1250 and on 23 February 1251, the village was named as Usse. In 1482, the Burgmann at the Nürburg (castle) was Michael von Ringelbach, who in 1485 sold a meadow to Peter von Esch, the Schultheiß at Mayen.

In the Middle Ages, Ueß belonged to the Electorate of Cologne as part of the Amt of Nürburg.

== Politics ==
=== Municipal council ===
The council is made up of 6 council members, who were elected by majority vote at the municipal election held on 25 May 2014, and the honorary mayor as chairman.

=== Mayor ===
Ueß's mayor is Achim Maas, and his deputy is Markus Möseler.

=== Coat of arms ===
The German blazon reads: Unter einem durch Zinnenschnitt von Rot und Silber geteilten Wellenschildhaupt in Schwarz wachsend ein silberner Kirchturm mit goldenem Dach.

The municipality's arms might in English heraldic language be described thus: Sable issuant from base a churchtower argent with roof Or, on a chief wavy per fess embattled of four gules and argent.

Ueß belonged until the end of feudal times to the Electoral-Cologne Amt of Nürburg, symbolized in these arms by the parting “per fess embattled” (that is, horizontally, but with a pattern resembling battlements on a castle wall) in the chief. The wavy line of partition setting this chief off from the main field is meant to symbolize the local brook, variously called the Üßbach or the Uess-Bach (these are both pronounced the same way, and there are yet other spellings). Standing in Ueß is a mighty, thousand-year-old, Romanesque churchtower, which has become the main charge in the municipality's arms. Also recalling the former allegiance to the Electorate of Cologne are the tinctures argent and sable (silver and black – Cologne's colours) in which the churchtower is rendered.

== Culture and sightseeing ==
Buildings:

- Saint Lucy’s Catholic Parish Church (Pfarrkirche St. Lucia), Hauptstraße – Romanesque churchtower, 11th/12th century, Gothic double-pitch tent roof; quire possibly from latter half of 14th century, Late Gothic columned hall, 1528, expanded into Gothic Revival hall in 1923; former rectory, quarrystone building, shortly after middle of 19th century; commercial buildings.
- Hauptstraße 10 – two-sided estate, Renaissance Revival basalt house from 1912, at the back older house with commercial part, apparently from 1840, low commercial wing.
