= Reimerath =

- Municipality
- Coat of arms

- Location of Reimerath within Vulkaneifel district
- Interactive map of Reimerath
- Location within Germany Location within Rhineland-Palatinate
- Coordinates: 50°18′33.5″N 6°57′33.90″E
- Country: Germany
- State: Rhineland-Palatinate
- District: Vulkaneifel
- Municipal assoc.: Kelberg

Government
  - Mayor (2019–24): Matthias Schneider

Area
  - Total: 2.54 km^{2} (0.98 sq mi)
- Elevation: 530 m (1,740 ft)

Population (2025-12-31)
  - Total: 67
  - Density: 26/km^{2} (68/sq mi)
- Time zone: UTC+01:00 (CET)
  - Summer (DST): UTC+02:00 (CEST)
- Postal codes: 53539
- Dialling codes: 02692
- Vehicle registration: DAU
- Website: www.reimerath.de

Reimerath is an Ortsgemeinde – a municipality belonging to a Verbandsgemeinde, a kind of collective municipality – in the Vulkaneifel district in Rhineland-Palatinate, Germany. It belongs to the Verbandsgemeinde of Kelberg, whose seat is in the like-named municipality.

== Geography ==
=== Location ===
The municipality lies in the Vulkaneifel, a part of the Eifel known for its volcanic history, geographical and geological features, and even ongoing activity today, including gases that sometimes well up from the earth.

=== Constituent communities ===
Reimerath has one outlying Ortsteil named Bruchhausen.

== History ==
In 1216, Reimerath had its first documentary mention as the estate of Revinroth. Bruchhausen had its first documentary mention in 1409.

The placename ending —roth refers to clearing woods for farming and points to a founding during the phase of clearings in the Late Middle Ages. In feudal times, until 1794, the village belonged to the Electoral-Cologne Amt of Nürburg. Under Prussian administration, Reimerath was a municipality in the Bürgermeisterei (“Mayoralty”) of Kelberg in the Adenau district. In the course of administrative restructuring in Rhineland-Palatinate in 1970, the municipality, along with the others in the Amt of Kelberg, was assigned to the Daun district, which has since been given the name Vulkaneifel.

Formerly, Reimerath was characterized by agriculture. Almost everybody owned cows. Until 1981, the village even had a full-time cowherd. The Kapelle zur Rosenkranzkönigin (“Chapel to Our Lady of the Rosary”) was built in 1951. There was once a sacristan here, but that was many years ago. The younger Möhnen (a traditional women's Carnival committee) see to the chapel's and the parish hall's cleanliness.

On the village's outskirts is an old quarry where trachyte was once mined. Some of this stone was used in the building of Cologne Cathedral. The lands have, however, long been let, and there is an angling pond there now.

== Politics ==
=== Municipal council ===
The council is made up of 6 council members, who were elected by majority vote at the municipal election held on 7 June 2009, and the honorary mayor as chairman.

=== Mayor ===
Reimerath's mayor is Matthias Schneider, and his deputy is Manfred Romes.

=== Coat of arms ===
The German blazon reads: Unter silbernem Schildhaupt mit schwarzem Balkenkreuz in Blau ein Kranz goldener Rosen mit silbernen Butzen.

The municipality's arms might in English heraldic language be described thus: Azure a chaplet of eight roses Or seeded argent, in a chief of the third a cross sable.

Until the conquest in the French Revolutionary Wars, Reimerath belonged to the Electorate of Cologne, which bore the black cross on a silver field seen in the chief of the municipality's arms. The chaplet on the blue field stands for the municipality's and the chapel's patron saint, Our Lady of the Rosary. This refers to her name in German, Rosenkranzkönigin. This means “Rosary Queen”, but Rosenkranz can also mean “rose chaplet”.

== Culture and sightseeing ==
Buildings:

- Catholic Church of Saint Mary, Our Lady of the Rosary (branch church; Filialkirche St. Maria Rosenkranzkönigin), Hauptstraße 17 – four-axis aisleless church from 1950.
- Hauptstraße 24 – timber-frame house, 18th/19th century.
- Hauptstraße/corner of Schulheiserweg – wayside cross, basalt beam cross from 16[...] (last two digits unclear).
- Wayside chapel, southwest of the village on the road to Kelberg – plastered building, possibly from 19th century.
