= Gelenberg =

- Municipality
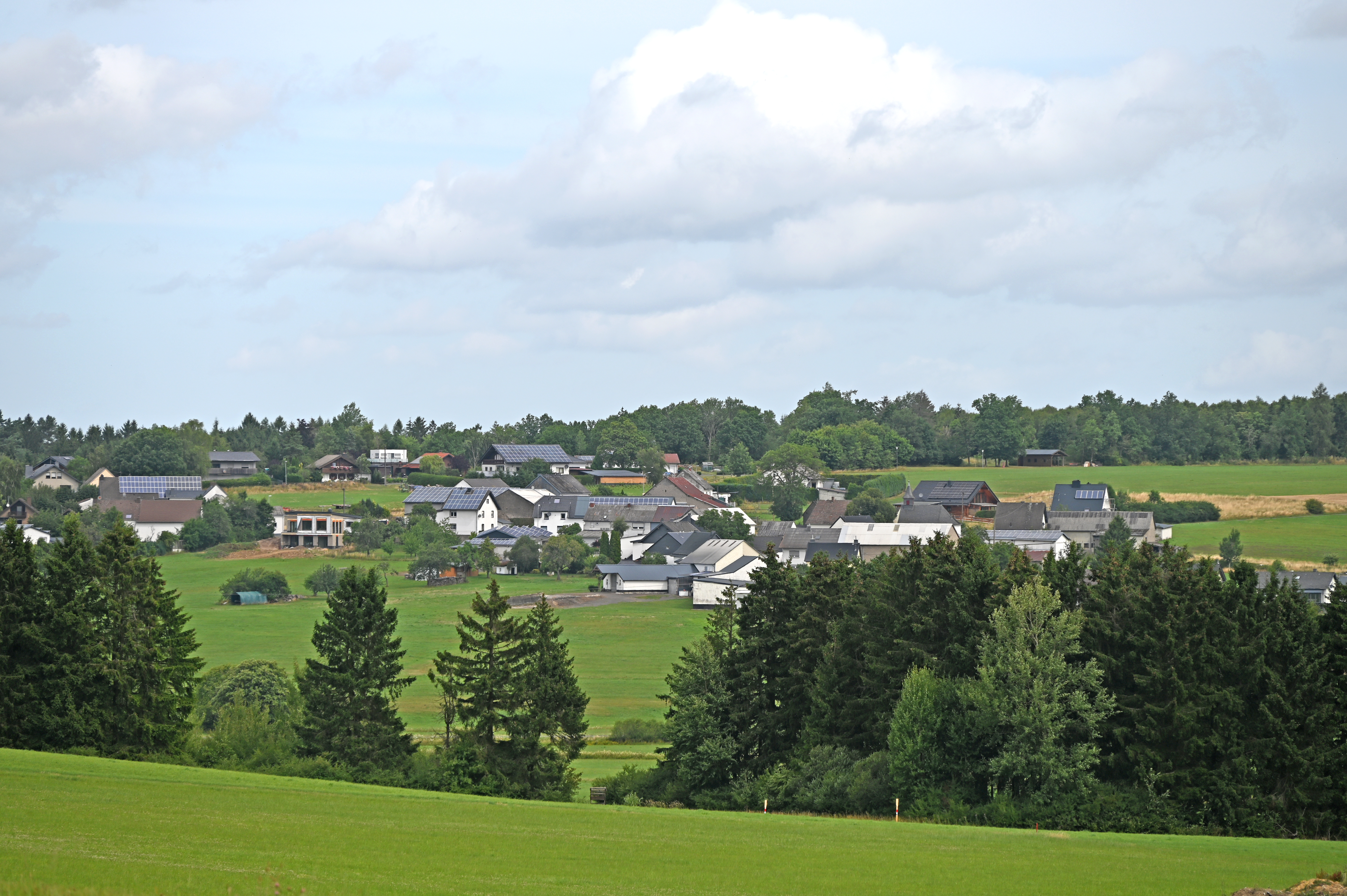
- Gelenberg from the south

- Coat of arms

- Location of Gelenberg within Vulkaneifel district
- Interactive map of Gelenberg
- Location within Germany Location within Rhineland-Palatinate
- Coordinates: 50°17′50″N 6°51′48″E
- Country: Germany
- State: Rhineland-Palatinate
- District: Vulkaneifel
- Municipal assoc.: Kelberg

Government
  - Mayor (2019–24): Peter Burggraf

Area
  - Total: 3.96 km^{2} (1.53 sq mi)
- Elevation: 535 m (1,755 ft)

Population (2025-12-31)
  - Total: 82
  - Density: 21/km^{2} (54/sq mi)
- Time zone: UTC+01:00 (CET)
  - Summer (DST): UTC+02:00 (CEST)
- Postal codes: 53539
- Dialling codes: 02692
- Vehicle registration: DAU

Gelenberg is an Ortsgemeinde – a municipality belonging to a Verbandsgemeinde, a kind of collective municipality – in the Vulkaneifel district in Rhineland-Palatinate, Germany. It belongs to the Verbandsgemeinde of Kelberg, whose seat is in the like-named municipality.

== Geography ==
=== Location ===
The municipality lies in the Vulkaneifel, a part of the Eifel known for its volcanic history, geographical and geological features, and even ongoing activity today, including gases that sometimes well up from the earth.

=== Geology ===
Near a basalt mountain at Gelenberg, an amygdaloidal layer was found in the greywacke.

== History ==
Gelenberg was settled very early on as witnessed by a group of prehistoric barrows. There are at least 17 of them, mostly untouched.

As early as 1683, Gelenberg had an oratory, as shown on a 1683 map of the Electoral-Trier Amt of Daun. It was consecrated to Saint Roch, patron saint of Plague victims. It was replaced in 1717 by a new chapel, this one consecrated to Saint Wendelin. However, by 1834, the chapel was in such a state of disrepair that services could no longer be held there. In 1848, a new one was built.

According to the 1817 local directory, the municipality had 88 inhabitants. In 1840, Gelenberg had 21 houses and 93 inhabitants. After the Franco-Prussian War in 1870 and 1871, the population had fallen to 80, reaching its lowest ever level – which it later reached once again – of 73 in 1905. This had risen back up to 83 by the time the Second World War broke out, only to fall down to 73 again by 1950. By 1964, this had risen to 87 and at the end of 1967, the population had reached 95, its all-time peak thus far.

== Religion ==
Roughly 90% of Gelenbergers are Roman Catholic. The village chapel is consecrated to Saint Wendelin. Gelenberg belongs to the Catholic parish of Bodenbach. People from Gelenberg also like to visit the Heyerbergkapelle (chapel) with its Way of the Cross in the forest.

== Politics ==
=== Municipal council ===
The council is made up of 6 council members, who were elected by majority vote at the municipal election held on 7 June 2009, and the honorary mayor as chairman.

=== Mayor ===
Gelenberg’s mayor is Peter Burggraf.

=== Coat of arms ===
The German blazon reads: In Grün über einem goldenen Berg, darin eine blaue Urne, eine links gewendete goldene Hirtenschaufel.

The municipality’s arms might in English heraldic language be described thus: Vert a herdsman’s shovel bendwise sinister Or, in base a mount of the second charged with an urn azure.

The “mount” in the base of the escutcheon refers to the barrows found in Gelenberg and is also a canting charge for the placename ending —berg (German for “mountain”). The urn also refers to the prehistoric finds made here. The herdsman’s shovel is a reference to the locally venerated saint, Wendelin of Trier, and the field tincture vert (green) stands for the village’s centuries-old agricultural character.

== Culture and sightseeing ==
Buildings:

- Catholic branch church, Kirchstraße 1, biaxial aisleless church, 1848.
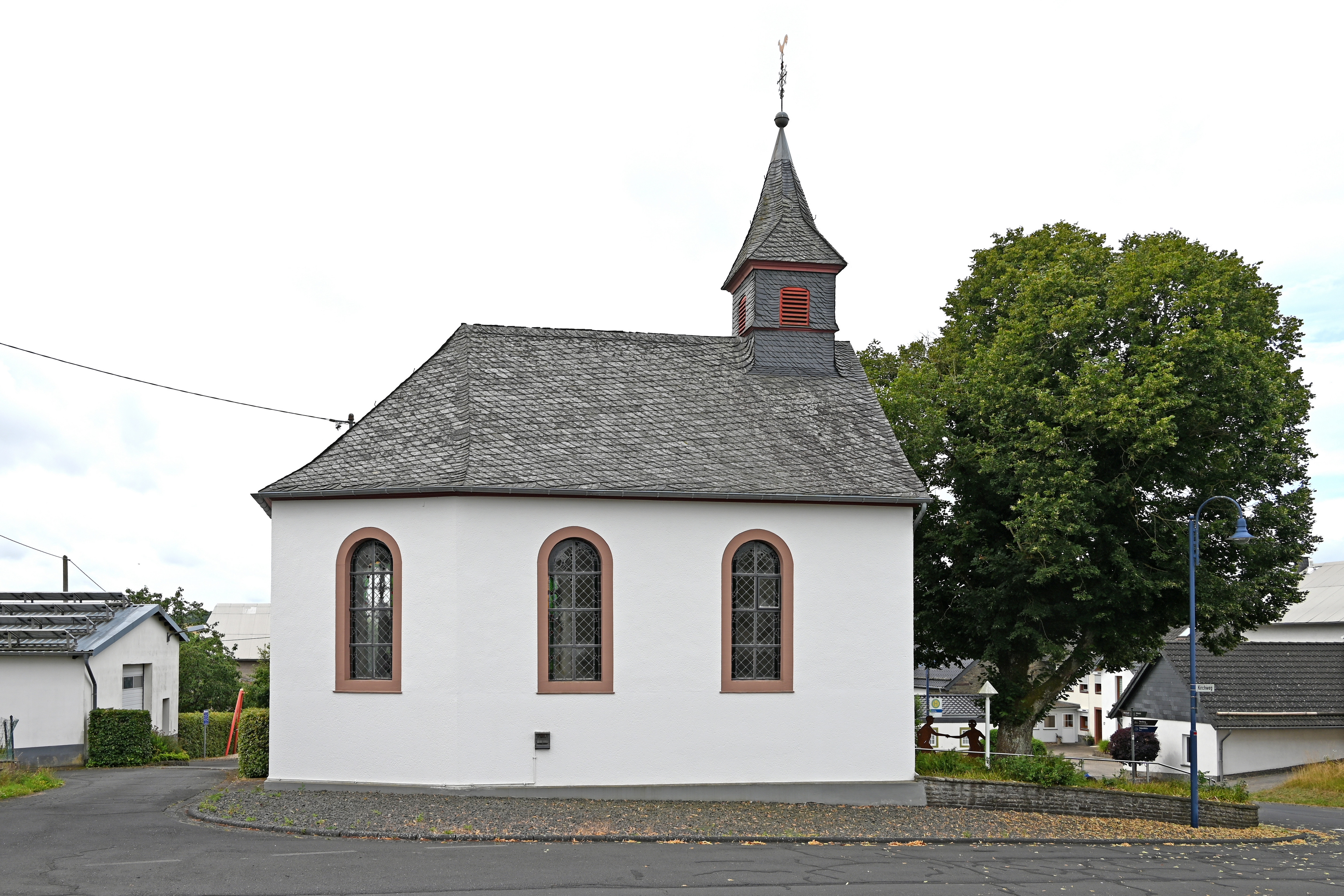
St Wendelin church with imperial lime tree

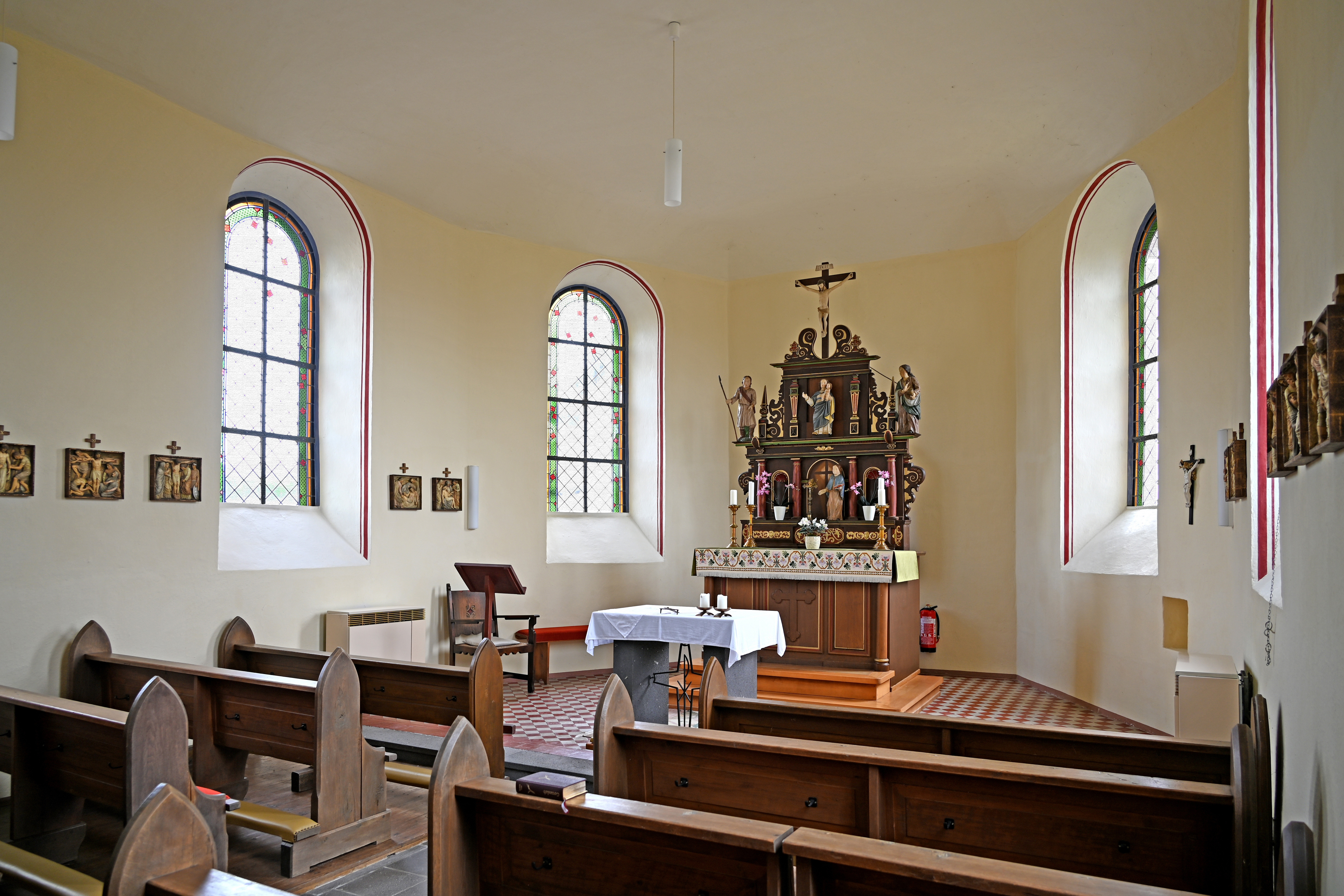
Interior

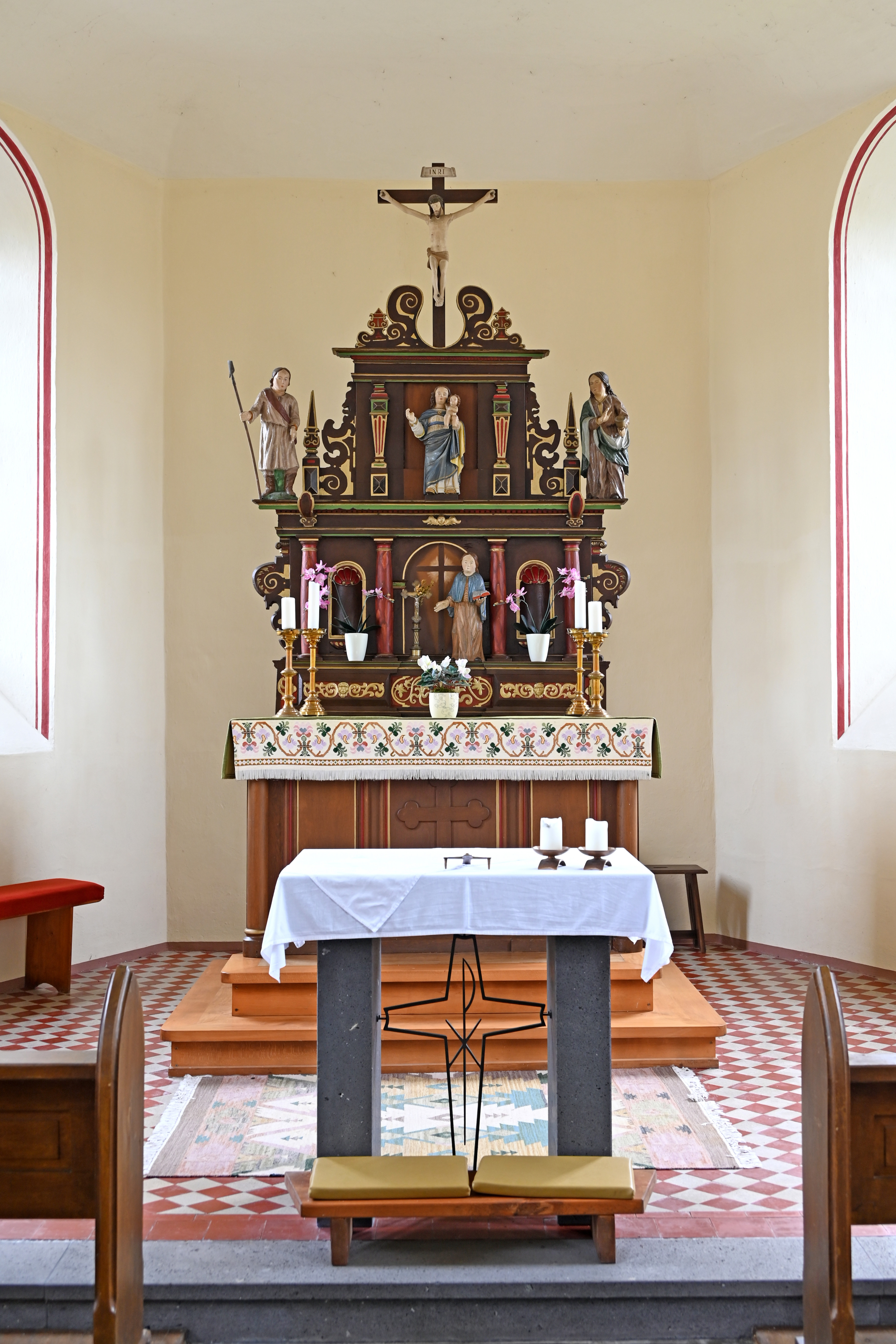
Baroque altar

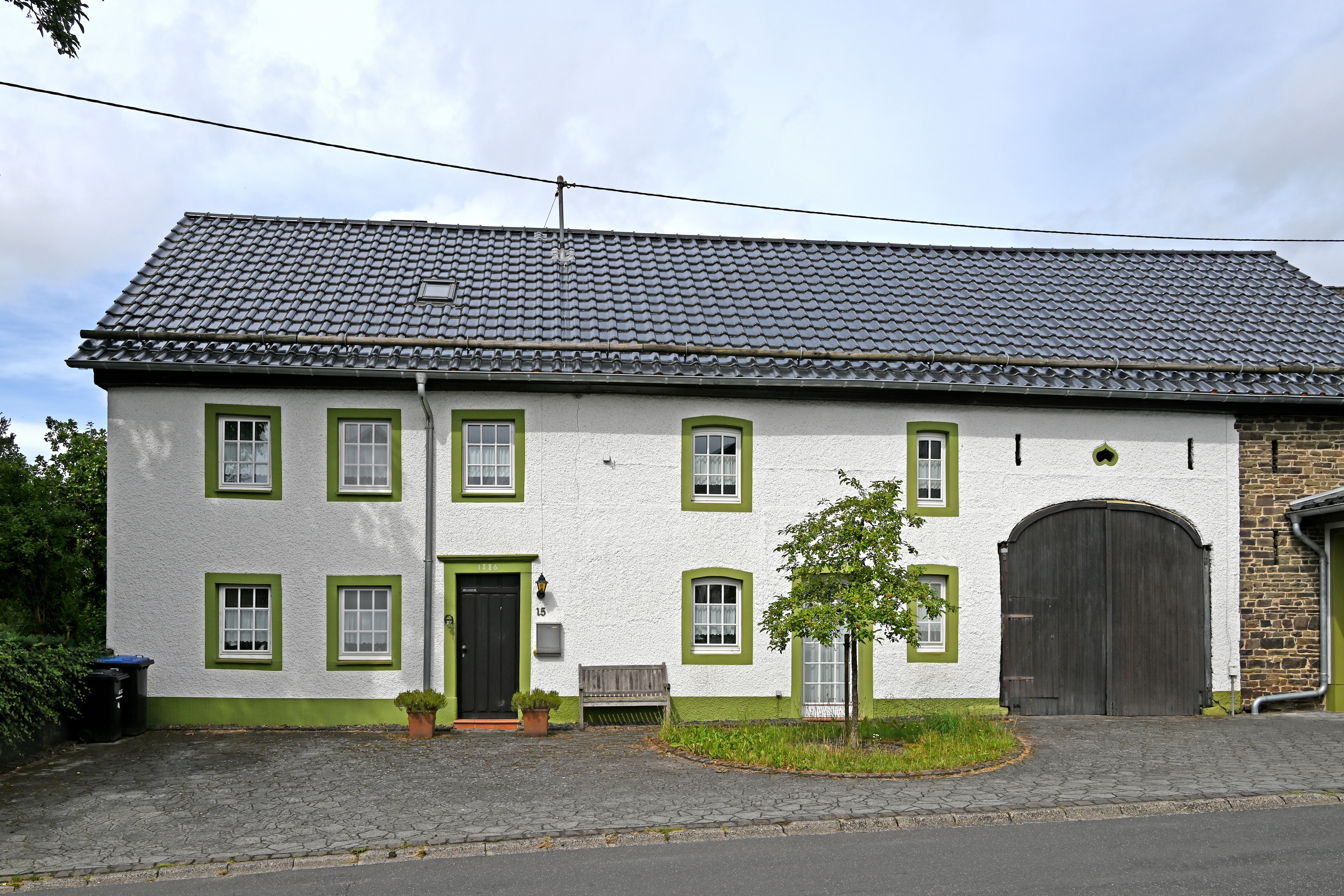
‘Trier House’ from 1886, Hauptstraße 15
