= Horperath =

- Municipality
- Location of Horperath within Vulkaneifel district
- Interactive map of Horperath
- Location within Germany Location within Rhineland-Palatinate
- Coordinates: 50°14′46″N 6°57′23″E
- Country: Germany
- State: Rhineland-Palatinate
- District: Vulkaneifel
- Municipal assoc.: Kelberg

Government
  - Mayor (2019–24): Heinz-Peter Reuter

Area
  - Total: 2.40 km^{2} (0.93 sq mi)
- Elevation: 470 m (1,540 ft)

Population (2025-12-31)
  - Total: 120
  - Density: 50/km^{2} (130/sq mi)
- Time zone: UTC+01:00 (CET)
  - Summer (DST): UTC+02:00 (CEST)
- Postal codes: 56766
- Dialling codes: 02692
- Vehicle registration: DAU
- Website: horperath.de

Horperath is an Ortsgemeinde – a municipality belonging to a Verbandsgemeinde, a kind of collective municipality – in the Vulkaneifel district in Rhineland-Palatinate, Germany. It belongs to the Verbandsgemeinde of Kelberg, whose seat is in the like-named municipality.

== Geography ==
The municipality lies in the Vulkaneifel, a part of the Eifel known for its volcanic history, geographical and geological features, and even ongoing activity today, including gases that sometimes well up from the earth.

== Politics ==
=== Municipal council ===
The council is made up of 6 council members, who were elected by majority vote at the municipal election held on 7 June 2009, and the honorary mayor as chairman.

=== Mayor ===
Horperath's mayor is Heinz-Peter Reuter.

=== Coat of arms ===
The German blazon reads: Von Silber über Rot geteilt, oben ein schwarzes Balkenkreuz, unten 3 (2:1) goldene Kugeln.

The municipality's arms might in English heraldic language be described thus: Per fess argent a cross sable and gules three bezants.

Until the end of feudal times, Horperath, as part of the Amt of Nürburg, was an Electoral-Cologne holding, and the Cross of Cologne in the upper half of the escutcheon recalls this time. The chapel in Horperath was built in 1747. The three bezants stand for Saint Nicholas’s attribute of three golden globes and thus represent the village's and the chapel's patron saint.

== Culture and sightseeing ==
Buildings:

- Saint Nicholas's Catholic Church (branch church; Filialkirche St. Nikolaus), small aisleless church, timber-frame barrel vault, from 1747.
- Im Ollen 6 – solid house, timber-frame gables, from 1836, but possibly essentially older.
- Zum Lindental 2 – long Quereinhaus (a combination residential and commercial house divided for these two purposes down the middle, perpendicularly to the street), from 1869.
