= Reinhard Saftig =

German football manager (born 1952)

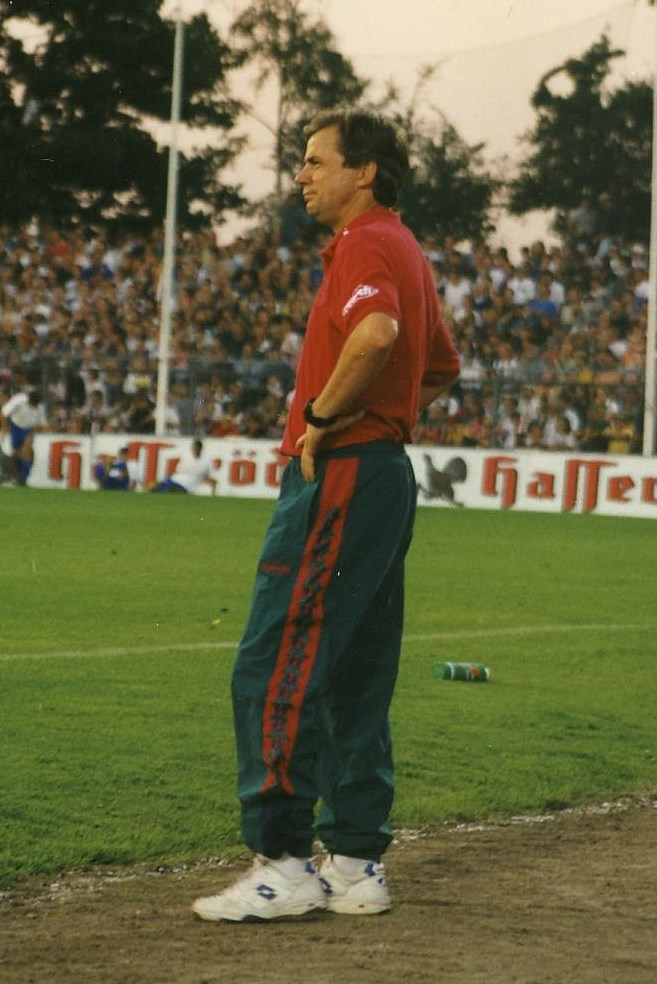
- Saftig coaching Mainz 05 in 1997

Personal information
- Full name: Reinhard Saftig
- Date of birth: 23 January 1952 (age 74)
- Place of birth: Uersfeld, West Germany
- Position: Midfielder

Youth career
- 1964–: TuS Mayen

Senior career*
Years	Team	Apps	(Gls)
–1974	TuS Mayen		
1974–1975	FV 04 Godesberg		
1975–1977	Sportfreunde Eisbachtal		
1977–1979	TuS Mayen		

Managerial career
- 1979–1983: Bayern Munich (assistant)
- 1983: Bayern Munich (caretaker)
- 1983–1986: Borussia Dortmund (assistant)
- 1986–1988: Borussia Dortmund
- 1989: Hannover 96
- 1989–1991: VfL Bochum
- 1991–1993: Bayer Leverkusen
- 1994: Kocaelispor
- 1994–1995: Galatasaray
- 1997: Mainz 05
- 2003–2005: Borussia Dortmund (scout)
- 2005–2008: Arminia Bielefeld (general manager)
- * Club domestic league appearances and goals

Reinhard Saftig (born 23 January 1952) is a German retired football player and manager.

Saftig has served as head coach of Bayern Munich, Borussia Dortmund, Hannover 96, VfL Bochum, and Bayer Leverkusen in the German Bundesliga.

== Career ==
Saftig was born in Uersfeld. He began his head coaching career as the short-term manager of Bayern Munich, as a replacement for Pal Csernai. Saftig was in this role for 45 days only (17 May to 30 June 1983).

He then took over in Borussia Dortmund in the latter half of the 1985–86 season and secured Borussia's stay in the top flight in three intense relegation play-offs against 2. Bundesliga side Fortuna Köln. The following season was much stronger and resulted in Borussia Dortmund qualifying for the UEFA Cup after finishing 4th.

In 1991, Saftig arrived at the scene of a fatal highway accident involving Maurice Banach, a former player in the A-Youth squad of Borussia Dortmund, before the emergency services arrived. Banach had played for Saftig during his time with the youth squad.

During the 1992–93 season, Saftig led Bayer Leverkusen to the final of the German Cup. After his untimely firing by the club, Leverkusen would go on to clinch the Cup, defeating Hertha Berlin Amateurs in the final.

In 1994, he briefly took over the reins of Turkish club Kocaelispor before switching to Galatasaray.

From 22 June 2005 until 2008, Saftig served as general manager for Arminia Bielefeld. Prior to this position, he had worked as chief scout for Borussia Dortmund.

== Coaching record ==
As of 27 October 2014

Team	From	To	Record					
Team	From	To	M	W	D	L	Win %	Ref.
Bayern Munich	16 May 1983	30 June 1983	3	1	1	1	33.33	
Borussia Dortmund	24 October 1984	27 October 1984	1	1	0	0	100.00	
Borussia Dortmund	20 April 1986	26 June 1988	86	33	24	29	38.37	
Hannover 96	22 March 1989	30 June 1989	12	1	4	7	8.33	
VfL Bochum	1 July 1989	22 April 1991	64	19	16	29	29.69	
Bayer Leverkusen	1 July 1991	4 May 1993	78	35	26	17	44.87	
Galatasaray	1 July 1994	15 March 1995	38	21	7	10	55.26	
Mainz 05	11 March 1997	22 August 1997	19	7	7	5	36.84	
Total			318	130	86	102	40.88	—
