= Uersfeld =

- Municipality
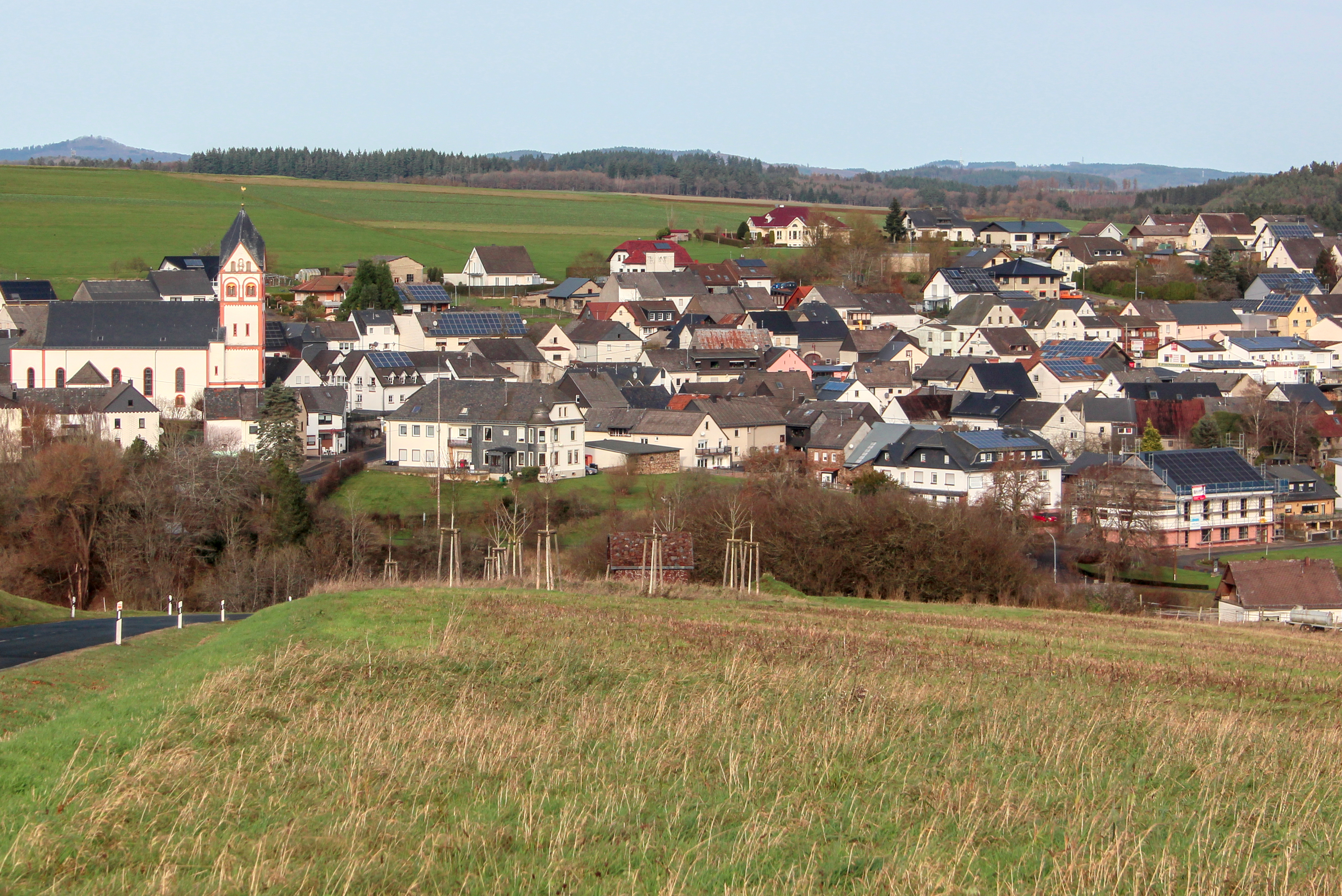

- Coat of arms

- Location of Uersfeld within Vulkaneifel district
- Interactive map of Uersfeld
- Location within Germany Location within Rhineland-Palatinate
- Coordinates: 50°15′20″N 7°0′50″E
- Country: Germany
- State: Rhineland-Palatinate
- District: Vulkaneifel
- Municipal assoc.: Kelberg

Government
  - Mayor (2019–24): Andreas Daniels

Area
  - Total: 4.26 km^{2} (1.64 sq mi)
- Elevation: 450 m (1,480 ft)

Population (2025-12-31)
  - Total: 678
  - Density: 159/km^{2} (412/sq mi)
- Time zone: UTC+01:00 (CET)
  - Summer (DST): UTC+02:00 (CEST)
- Postal codes: 56767
- Dialling codes: 02657
- Vehicle registration: DAU
- Website: www.uersfeld.de

Uersfeld is an Ortsgemeinde – a municipality belonging to a Verbandsgemeinde, a kind of collective municipality – in the Vulkaneifel district in Rhineland-Palatinate, Germany. It belongs to the Verbandsgemeinde of Kelberg, whose seat is in the like-named municipality.

== Geography ==
=== Location ===
The municipality lies in the Vulkaneifel, a part of the Eifel known for its volcanic history, geographical and geological features, and even ongoing activity today, including gases that sometimes well up from the earth.

=== Geology ===
Like the rest of what is now the Eifel, the place that is now Uersfeld was underwater about 400,000,000 years ago, at the bottom of a Devonian sea. This is witnessed by fossils of sea creatures. Such things were found many years ago by Franz Krämer from Kölnische Höfe (a hamlet now belonging to Kaperich) near Uersfeld's railway station. About 200,000,000 years ago, the Eifel was not only no longer underwater, but also considerably drier than it is today. It was a Triassic desert whose existence is still witnessed today in deposits of bunter and Rotliegend. About 70,000,000 years ago, a subtropical to tropical climate prevailed.

The mountains Höchst, Hochkelberg and others in the High Eifel arose about 35,000,000 years ago as a result of Tertiary vulcanism. The maars, however, are quite new, at least geologically speaking, the Mosbrucher Weiher being only 11,000 years old, and the Ulmener Maar only about 10,000.

== History ==
In the New Stone Age (3000 to 2000 BC), the Uersfeld-Kelberg area was home to hunter-gatherers, as witnessed by finds of flint blades and stone hatchets. The first time in which there were settlers in the area came in the first millennium BC, specifically about 700 BC, in Hallstatt times. There have been finds in the Uersfeld-Kelberg area from this time through to late Roman times, showing that there was settlement, albeit rather thin, but continuous, growing settlement nevertheless.

A great deal is known about Roman times in the area from archaeological finds. What is known matches ancient authors’ writings and is defined by ceramic finds and also coins. Dendrochronology can even yield details of years in which things happened.

Many barrow fields can be found in the Uersfeld church woods within the limits of the outlying centre of Höchstberg. However, for want of any archaeological investigation, it is uncertain from what time they date, but the grave robberies and Court Counsellor Comes's (1774-1856) resulting collection in Cochem have yielded some idea of the time. Court Counsellor Comes bequeathed part of his collection to the Society for Beneficial Research (Gesellschaft für nützliche Forschungen) in Trier. The rest was auctioned off, scattering Roman finds from Uersfeld throughout the world.

After the fall of the Roman Empire in the 5th century, there was nothing left in the Vulkaneifel but empty land. This is not hard to understand when one considers that all Western Europe lay at the perhaps 200,000 Frankish warriors’ feet. The Vulkaneifel could hardly have been called the most fruitful land available to the Franks and their families, nor the land with the most favourable climate. For well over one thousand years, people held an unfavourable opinion of the region.

With few exceptions, the area around the Hochkelberg and the Höchst, where Uersfeld now lies, was uninhabited. Only in the 11th century did the first clearing in a thousand years take place.

In the early 12th century, Uersfeld (Urnesfeld) had its first documentary mention in an undated document. Research has put its date somewhere between 1120 and 1169. The Abbot of Springiersbach, Richard, is named in this document. Springiersbach Abbey's first two abbots were both named Richard. They appeared in document between 1120 and 1163. The third abbot, Gottfried von Springiersbach, only crops up in a document for the first time in 1169. The 1120-1169 time period for the document is confirmed by the mention of three witnesses to the document who are named, Heinrich von Ulmen and his brother Rudolf, and Theodorich von Klotten. All three are named in documents from 1130, and the brothers von Ulmen are furthermore mentioned in documents from 1144.

In the document containing the first documentary mention, Justina, the knight Siegfried's noble wife, bequeathed three estates at Uersfeld, Wollmerath and Princka, which she had inherited from her rich father Alberto, to Springiersbach Abbey, receiving in consideration thereof eight Fuder of wine each year (a Fuder was somewhere between 800 and 1 000 L).

== Politics ==
=== Municipal council ===
The council is made up of 12 council members, who were elected by proportional representation at the municipal election held on 7 June 2009, and the honorary mayor as chairman.

The municipal election held on 7 June 2009 yielded the following results:

Year	SPD	FWG 1	FWG 2	Total
2009	2	7	3	12 seats
2004	2	7	3	12 seats

Elections on 25 May 2014:

- WGR: 7 seats
- GfU: 5 seats

=== Mayor ===
Uersfeld's mayor is Andreas Daniels, and his deputies are Werner Ritter and Elke Michels.

=== Coat of arms ===
The German blazon reads: Schild geteilt, oben gespalten; oben vorne in Grün eine silberne Windmühle, hinten in Silber ein schwarzes Balkenkreuz, belegt mit zwei schräggekreuzten Glevestäben, wobei die Stäbe gold, die Lilien rot sind; unten in Rot ein schräglinker, silberner Bischofsstab, belegt mit einem liegenden rückwärtssehenden silbernen Wolf.

The municipality's arms might in English heraldic language be described thus: Per fess, in chief per pale vert a windmill argent and argent a cross sable surmounted by two glaives per saltire staves Or and heads flory gules, in base gules a bishop's staff bendwise sinister surmounted by a wolf couchant reguardant of the second.

A windmill once stood near where the sporting ground is today, thus explaining the first charge. The black cross represents a former overlord, the Electorate of Cologne. The glaives come from a seal used by Johann von Husener from Uersfeld, who lived in the municipality in the 14th and 15th centuries as an Imperial notary. The bishop's staff and the wolf stand for the church's patron saint, Remaclus.

== Culture and sightseeing ==
Buildings:

- Saint Remaclus’s Catholic Church, Kirchstraße 1 – Baroque aisleless church, 1782, Romanesque Revival tower, 1895; basalt graveyard cross, 1785.
- Near Bergstraße 15 – wayside cross, basalt shaft cross from 1772
- Basalt fountain in the village centre.

== Notable people ==
- Reinhard Saftig, German football trainer
