= Kelberg (Verbandsgemeinde) =

Municipality in Rhineland-Palatinate, Germany

- Verbandsgemeinde
- Location of Kelberg within Vulkaneifel district
- Interactive map of Kelberg
- Location within Germany Location within Rhineland-Palatinate
- Coordinates: 50°17′N 6°55′E
- Country: Germany
- State: Rhineland-Palatinate
- District: Vulkaneifel
- Seat: Kelberg
- Subdivisions: 33 municipalities

Area
  - Total: 140.07 km^{2} (54.08 sq mi)

Population (2025-12-31)
  - Total: 6,926
  - Density: 49.45/km^{2} (128.1/sq mi)
- Time zone: UTC+01:00 (CET)
  - Summer (DST): UTC+02:00 (CEST)
- Website: www.vgv-kelberg.de

Kelberg is a Verbandsgemeinde ("collective municipality") in the district Vulkaneifel, in Rhineland-Palatinate, Germany. The seat of the Verbandsgemeinde is in Kelberg.

The Verbandsgemeinde Kelberg consists of the following Ortsgemeinden ("local municipalities"):

1. Arbach
2. Beinhausen
3. Bereborn
4. Berenbach
5. Bodenbach
6. Bongard
7. Borler
8. Boxberg
9. Brücktal
10. Drees
11. Gelenberg
12. Gunderath
13. Höchstberg
14. Horperath
15. Hörschhausen
16. Kaperich
17. Katzwinkel
18. Kelberg
19. Kirsbach
20. Kolverath
21. Kötterichen
22. Lirstal
23. Mannebach
24. Mosbruch
25. Neichen
26. Nitz
27. Oberelz
28. Reimerath
29. Retterath
30. Sassen
31. Uersfeld
32. Ueß
33. Welcherath
