= Borler =

- Municipality
- Coat of arms

- Location of Borler within Vulkaneifel district
- Interactive map of Borler
- Location within Germany Location within Rhineland-Palatinate
- Coordinates: 50°18′56″N 6°49′42″E
- Country: Germany
- State: Rhineland-Palatinate
- District: Vulkaneifel
- Municipal assoc.: Kelberg

Government
  - Mayor (2019–24): Franz-Josef Neunkirchen

Area
  - Total: 4.54 km^{2} (1.75 sq mi)
- Elevation: 440 m (1,440 ft)

Population (2025-12-31)
  - Total: 78
  - Density: 17/km^{2} (44/sq mi)
- Time zone: UTC+01:00 (CET)
  - Summer (DST): UTC+02:00 (CEST)
- Postal codes: 53539
- Dialling codes: 02696
- Vehicle registration: DAU
- Website: www.borler.de

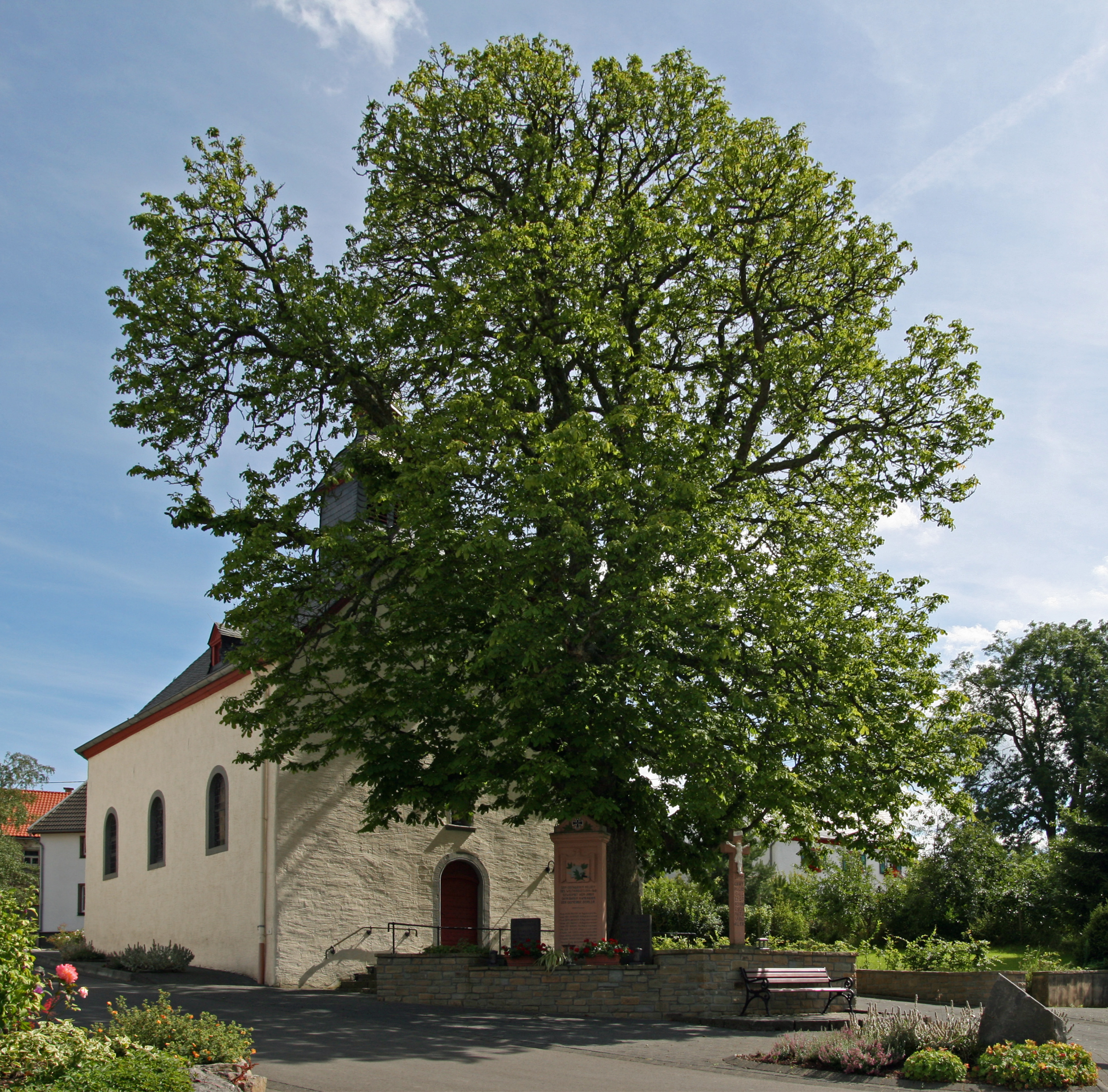
Village square (Hauptstraße 3): Saint Leonard's Catholic Church (branch church)

Borler is an Ortsgemeinde – a municipality belonging to a Verbandsgemeinde, a kind of collective municipality – in the Vulkaneifel district in Rhineland-Palatinate, Germany. It belongs to the Verbandsgemeinde of Kelberg, whose seat is in the like-named municipality.

== Geography ==
The municipality lies some 14 km from the Nürburgring in the Vulkaneifel, a part of the Eifel known for its volcanic history, geographical and geological features, and even ongoing activity today, including gases that sometimes well up from the earth.

== History ==
The village's street layout was extensively remodelled in 2006. The costs were to a great extent borne by Borler's citizens. All streets and paths were newly expanded. Streets with sidewalks, or pavements, on both sides were changed so that there was only one sidewalk. Leftover bits of land were given over to drought-resistant plants. The big playground in the middle of the village was converted to building land and replaced by a smaller playground behind the fire station. Today, many weekenders can be found in the village, including Belgians and people from the German urban agglomerations, such as the Ruhr area.

Once, agriculture shaped village life. By means of the Marshall Plan, a grassland and research institute was established in Borler. In the course of time, the institute, which was run by the Chamber of Agriculture, was abandoned. Until the 1980s, dairy cattle characterized the agriculture. The fodder was grown on the neighbouring meadows and cropfields around the village. There still is agriculture, but it is now commercially quite secondary.

== Politics ==
=== Municipal council ===
The council is made up of 6 council members, who were elected by majority vote at the municipal election held on 7 June 2009, and the honorary mayor as chairman.

=== Coat of arms ===
The German blazon reads: Im geteilten Schild oben in Gold ein wachsender, doppelköpfiger, rot bewehrter, schwarzer Adler, unten in rot 5 (2:1:2) silberne Ringe.

The municipality's arms might in English heraldic language be described thus: Per fess Or a demi-eagle bicapitate sable armed gules and gules five annulets argent, two, one and two.

One might add the words “and langued” after “armed”, but the German blazon mentions nothing about the tongue's tincture.

On the Heyerberg near the village once stood a castle with a chapel and also an estate. Their owner was St. Maximin's Abbey in Trier, but the Abbey had enfeoffed the Knights of Heyer with them. History mentioned them with Wilhelm, Burgmann of Daun in 1359. The Knights’ arms showed the five rings, or annulets, in the quincunx pattern, and in Borler's arms, they appear in Electoral-Trier tinctures beneath the line of partition. Set into the chapel above the portal is a Rococo cartouche bearing St. Maximin's arms. These show the two-headed (“bicapitate”) eagle above and a chalice below, along with three stars. The arms come from the former estate building, now no longer standing, and the eagle now appears in Borler's arms above the line of partition.

== Culture and sightseeing ==
=== Religion ===
The citizens of Borler are roughly 90% Roman Catholic. Borler belongs to the parish of Bodenbach. In the 1990s, the village chapel, consecrated to Saint Leonard, was extensively renovated both inside and out with the support of the Diocese of Trier and the Ortsgemeinde.

=== Heyerbergkapelle ===
The Heyerbergkapelle (also known as the Borler Kapelle) is a Romanesque Revival chapel built in 1875 some 1 200 m southeast of the village on the wooded Heyerberg (mountain). Before today's chapel, the old Heyerkirche (church) once stood on this same spot, even before 1600. It was a castle chapel and the gravesite for the Lords of Heyer. Right nearby stood the Electoral-Cologne Haus Heyer and the Electoral-Trier Hof Heyer. In the chapel, Saint Leonard, Saint Pancras and John the Baptist, whose statues are still preserved today, were revered. In the early 19th century, the chapel was first closed, and then in the years that followed, it was removed. Even the graveyard was closed in 1805, as Borler was part of the parish of Nohn, where the dead were thereafter buried.

In 1874, on Borler citizens’ initiative and with their donations, the new Heyerbergkapelle was built. The Romanesque Revival building with its semicircular apse was dedicated to Our Lady of Sorrows. At the church, restored in 1952, is a Way of the Cross, created in 1878, with 14 stations laid out with the distances proportional to the ones on the Via Dolorosa in Jerusalem.

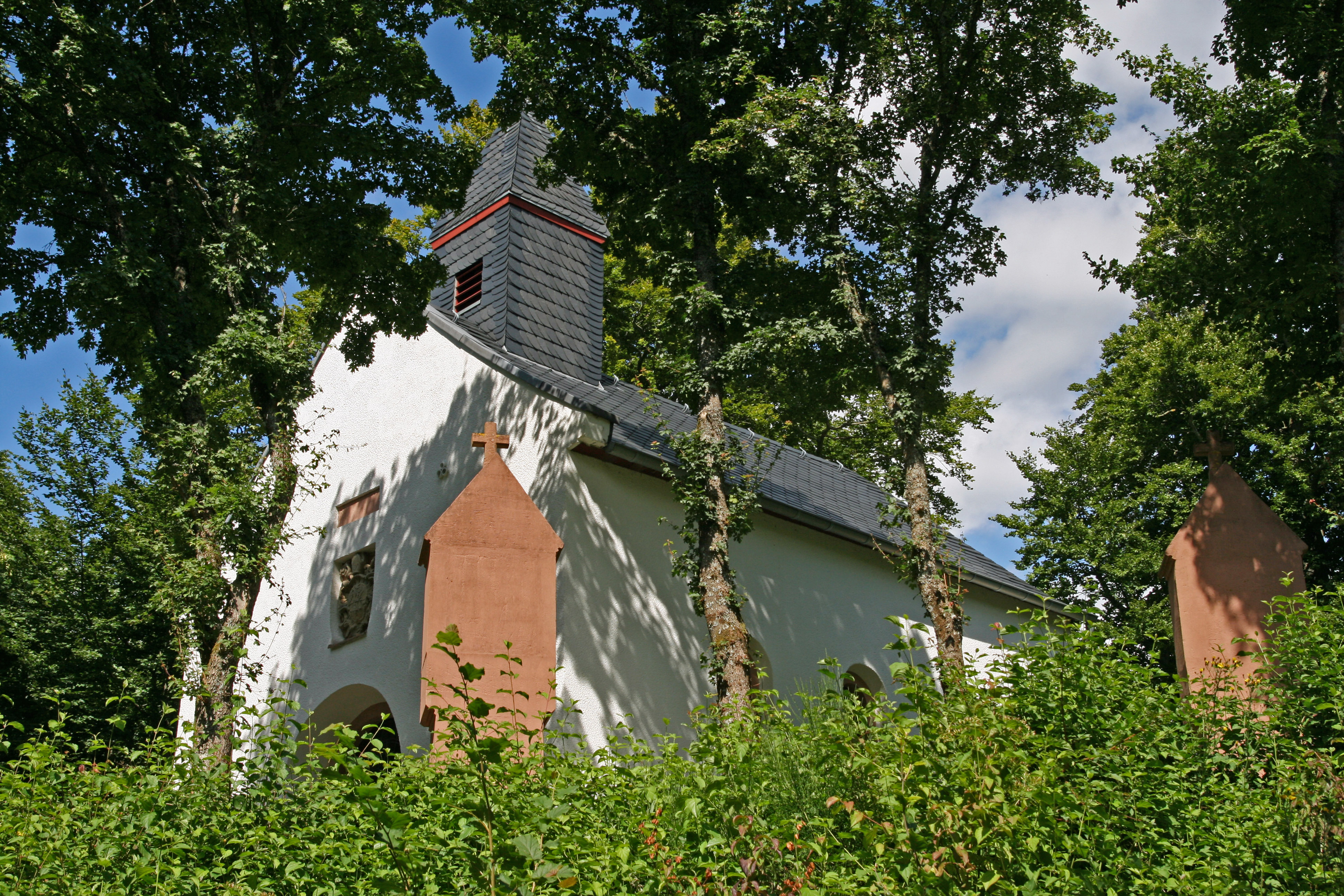
Heyerbergkapelle

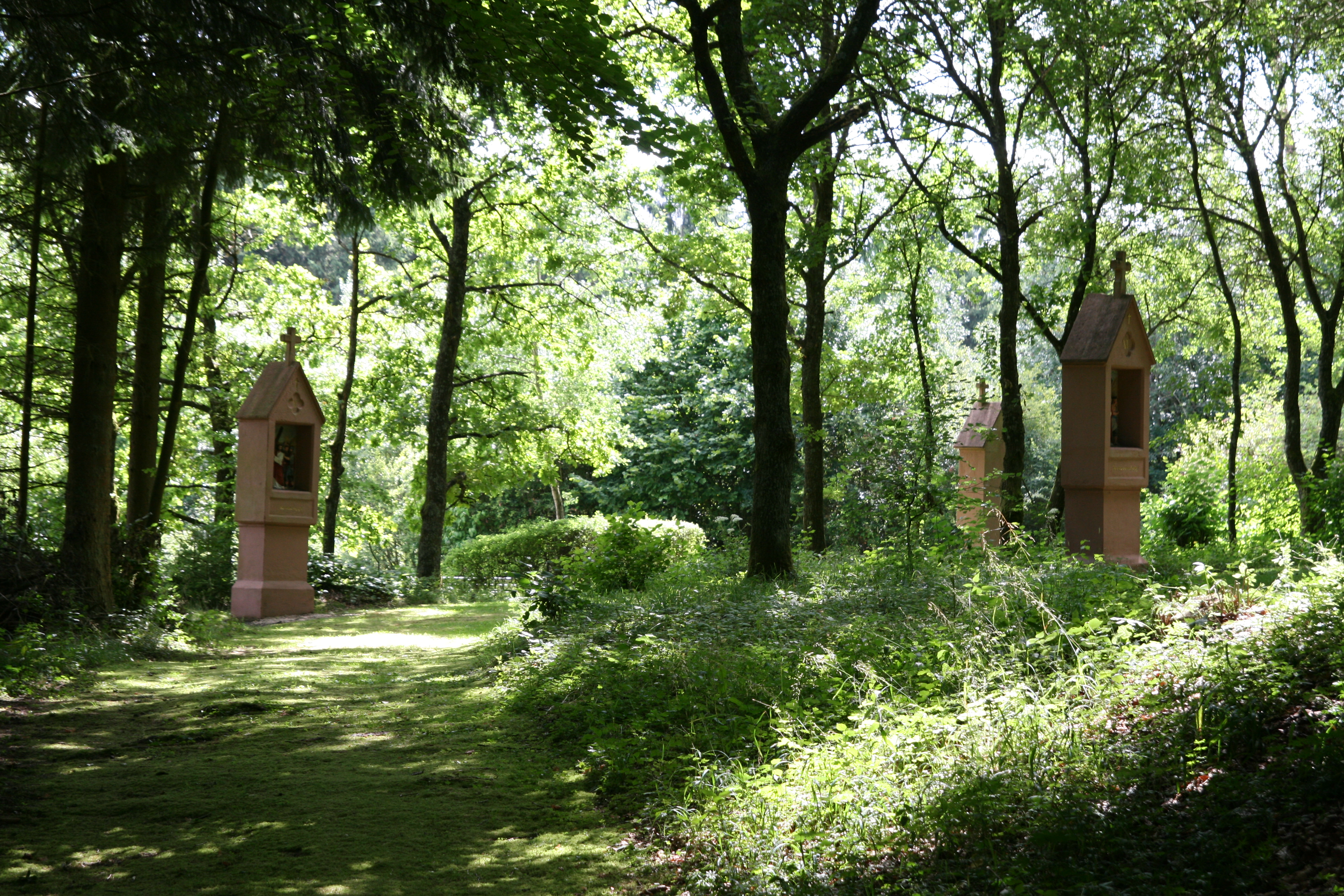
Way of the Cross

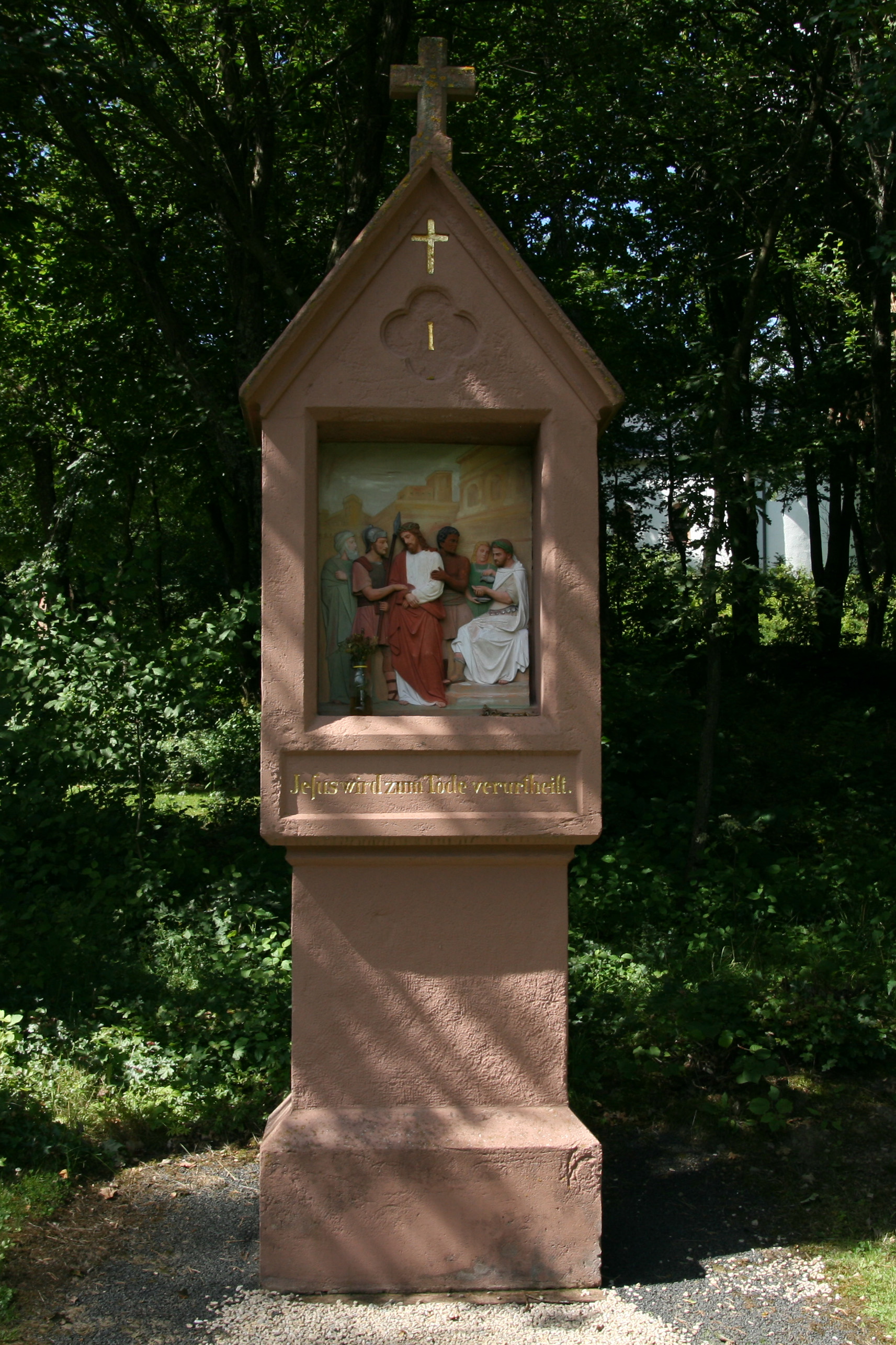
Stele on the Way of the Cross

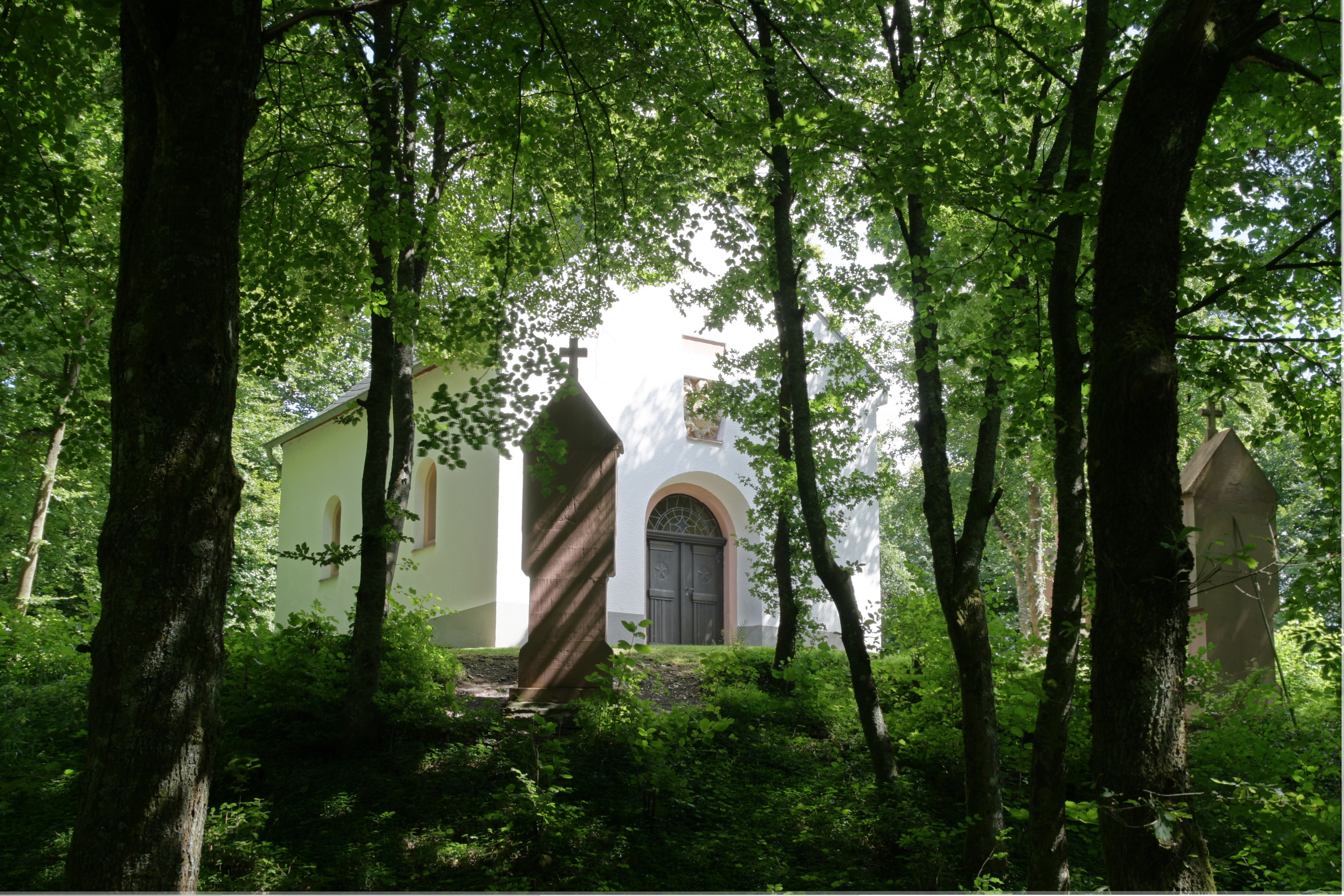
Heyerbergkapelle

=== Buildings ===
- Saint Leonard's Catholic Church (branch church), Hauptstraße 3, aisleless church from 1752 to 1753, shaft cross from 1790, 1914-1918 warriors’ memorial
- Bachgasse 3 – small timber-frame house, partly plastered
- Hauptstraße 1 – timber-frame house, 18th-19th century, knee wall raised in the 20th century
- Hauptstraße 10 – timber-frame house, partly solid, roof with half-hipped gables, latter half of the 18th century
- Kapellenweg 3 – building with roof with half-hipped gables, apparently from 1825
- Heyerbergkapelle or Borler Kapelle (see above), six small basalt crosses from 1761, 1756, 1699, 1779, 1699 and 1788
