= Sassen, Germany =

Sassen
- Municipality
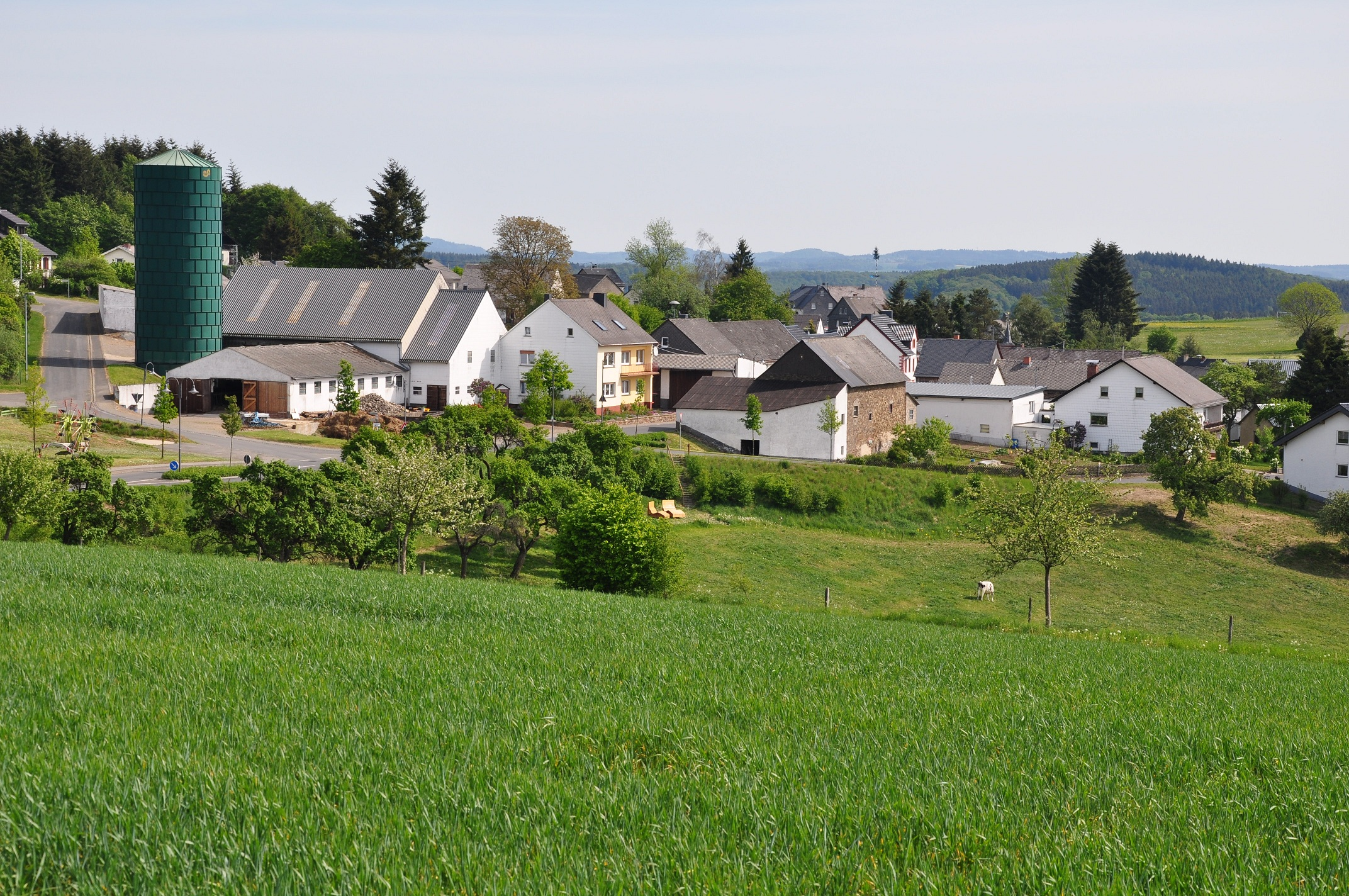

- Coat of arms

- Location of Sassen within Vulkaneifel district
- Interactive map of Sassen
- Location within Germany Location within Rhineland-Palatinate
- Coordinates: 50°15′58.27″N 6°57′57.98″E
- Country: Germany
- State: Rhineland-Palatinate
- District: Vulkaneifel
- Municipal assoc.: Kelberg

Government
  - Mayor (2019–24): Werner Nohner

Area
  - Total: 3.33 km^{2} (1.29 sq mi)
- Elevation: 550 m (1,800 ft)

Population (2025-12-31)
  - Total: 96
  - Density: 29/km^{2} (75/sq mi)
- Time zone: UTC+01:00 (CET)
  - Summer (DST): UTC+02:00 (CEST)
- Postal codes: 56767
- Dialling codes: 02692
- Vehicle registration: DAU

Sassen is an Ortsgemeinde – a municipality belonging to a Verbandsgemeinde, a kind of collective municipality – in the Vulkaneifel district in Rhineland-Palatinate, Germany. It belongs to the Verbandsgemeinde of Kelberg, whose seat is in the like-named municipality.

== Name ==
The municipality's name, Sassen, is derived from the German word Ansassen or Beisassen, words once used to designate people who were not local, but rather had come from elsewhere to settle. The area around Ülmen and Ürsfeld was already settled when others came along to settle at the village now known as Sassen.

Another explanation, however, is that the name arose from transplanted Saxons brought to the Eifel by Charlemagne. A Carthusian monk wrote in an account that Charlemagne also removed Franks from the Eifel to the Saxons’ homeland as part of his campaign to break Saxon resistance once and for all.

== Geography ==
The municipality lies in the Vulkaneifel, a part of the Eifel known for its volcanic history, geographical and geological features, and even ongoing activity today, including gases that sometimes well up from the earth.

Sassen lies on the south slopes of the Hochkelberg, the High Eifel’s third highest mountain, in a hollow with an elevation of about 550 m above sea level.

== History ==
In feudal times, which ended in 1794 with the French occupation, Sassen belonged to the Electoral-Cologne Amt of Nürburg. Under Prussian administration, it was a municipality in the Bürgermeisterei (“Mayoralty”) of Kelberg in the Adenau district. In the course of administrative restructuring in Rhineland-Palatinate in 1970, the municipality, along with the others in the Amt of Kelberg, was assigned to the Daun district, which has since been given the name Vulkaneifel.

Below the village once lay a farm, which may have been the “seed” for the first settlement in what is now the municipality. The oldest houses are all bungalows built out of Rhenish brick (an air-dried brick made of 9 parts pumice to 1 part lime) and simple woodwork. The front door opens straight into the kitchen. Above the stove was the smoke hood for smoking meat.

Sassen was once held by the Counts of Nürburg. The court was in Ülmen. Tithes were paid to the castle there and to Nürburg. On the Hohe Acht, a height near the village (not the like-named mountain), lay two fields, one named Zehntanwand and the other Freianwand, references to paying tithes (Zehnten – frei means “free”).

At the south end of the village stands a small chapel, which features Stations of the Cross. It was built in 1807, a date engraved above the door.

Ecclesiastically, Sassen once belonged to the parish of Ürsfeld, but since 1809 it has belonged to the parish of Üß.

== Politics ==
=== Municipal council ===
The council is made up of 6 council members, who were elected by majority vote at the municipal election held on 7 June 2009, and the honorary mayor as chairman.

=== Mayor ===
Sassen's mayor is Werner Nohner.

=== Coat of arms ===
The German blazon reads: Unter silbernem Schildhaupt, darin ein durchgehendes, schwarzes Balkenkreuz, in Rot ein silbernes Antoniuskreuz mit zwei daran hängenden silbernen Pilgerglöckchen.

The municipality's arms might in English heraldic language be described thus: Gules a cross tau with a small bell hanging from each arm argent, on a chief of the second a cross sable.

Until 1794, Sassen belonged as part of the Amt of Nürburg to the Electorate of Cologne. The cross in the chief recalls this time. The charge below this, the T-shaped cross, is Saint Anthony's attribute, thus representing the municipality's patron saint. It is shown here with two “pilgrim’s bells”.

== Culture and sightseeing ==
Buildings:

- Saint Wendelin's Catholic Church (branch church; Filialkirche St. Wendelin), Hauptstraße – aisleless church from 1750.
- Hauptstraße 12 – timber-frame house, partly solid or slated, 19th century.
- Heiligenhäuschen (a small, shrinelike structure consecrated to a saint or saints), east of the village – Baroque red sandstone niche housing, Pietà.
