= Berenbach =

Municipality in Rhineland-Palatinate, Germany

- Municipality
- Coat of arms

- Location of Berenbach within Vulkaneifel district
- Interactive map of Berenbach
- Location within Germany Location within Rhineland-Palatinate
- Coordinates: 50°14′04″N 6°57′27″E
- Country: Germany
- State: Rhineland-Palatinate
- District: Vulkaneifel
- Municipal assoc.: Kelberg

Government
  - Mayor (2019–24): Birgit Wirtz

Area
  - Total: 3.15 km^{2} (1.22 sq mi)
- Elevation: 430 m (1,410 ft)

Population (2025-12-31)
  - Total: 161
  - Density: 51.1/km^{2} (132/sq mi)
- Time zone: UTC+01:00 (CET)
  - Summer (DST): UTC+02:00 (CEST)
- Postal codes: 56766
- Dialling codes: 02676
- Vehicle registration: DAU
- Website: www.berenbach.de

Berenbach (German pronunciation: [ˈbeːʁənbax]) is an Ortsgemeinde – a municipality belonging to a Verbandsgemeinde, a kind of collective municipality – in the Vulkaneifel district in Rhineland-Palatinate, Germany. It belongs to the Verbandsgemeinde of Kelberg, whose seat is in the like-named municipality.

== Geography ==
The municipality lies right next to Ulmen in the Vulkaneifel, a part of the Eifel known for its volcanic history, geographical and geological features, and even the ongoing activity today, including gases that sometimes well up from the earth.

== History ==
In the Middle Ages, Berenbach belonged to the Amt of Nürburg in the Electorate of Cologne. Under Prussian administration, the village was in the Bürgermeisterei (“Mayoralty”) of Kelberg.

In the course of administrative restructuring in Rhineland-Palatinate, Berenbach was transferred in 1970 from the Mayen district to the Daun district, now known as the Vulkaneifel district.

== Politics ==
=== Municipal council ===
The council is made up of 6 council members, who were elected by majority vote at the municipal election held on 7 June 2009, and the honorary mayor as chairman.

=== Coat of arms ===
The German blazon reads: In silbernem Schild ein blauer Wellenbalken, oben ein schwarzes Balkenkreuz, unten ein aufsteigender roter Krummstab.

The municipality's arms might in English heraldic language be described thus: Argent a fess wavy azure, in chief a cross sable, issuant from base an abbot's staff sinister gules.

The village's allegiance in feudal times to the Electorate of Cologne is symbolized by the black cross on the silver field in the upper part of the escutcheon, as this was Cologne's armorial bearing. Both the 1774 church and the newer one built in 1933 are under Saint Bridget's patronage, symbolized in the base of the arms by her staff. The wavy fess (horizontal stripe) stands for the Ueßbach, the river that splits the village into two parts; it is also canting for the placename ending —bach (“brook”).

== Culture and sightseeing ==
=== Buildings ===
- Catholic church at Bergfrieden 16, an aisleless church built between 1933 and 1940.
- Furthermühle – a mill south of the village on the Ueßbach, apparently in historical condition, but fenced off.

== Transport ==
Berenbach train stop is located at Cross Eifel Railway from Andernach via Mayen and Ulmen to Gerolstein although the section from Kaisersesch to Gerolstein right now it is out of service.
