= Niederstadtfeld =

- Municipality
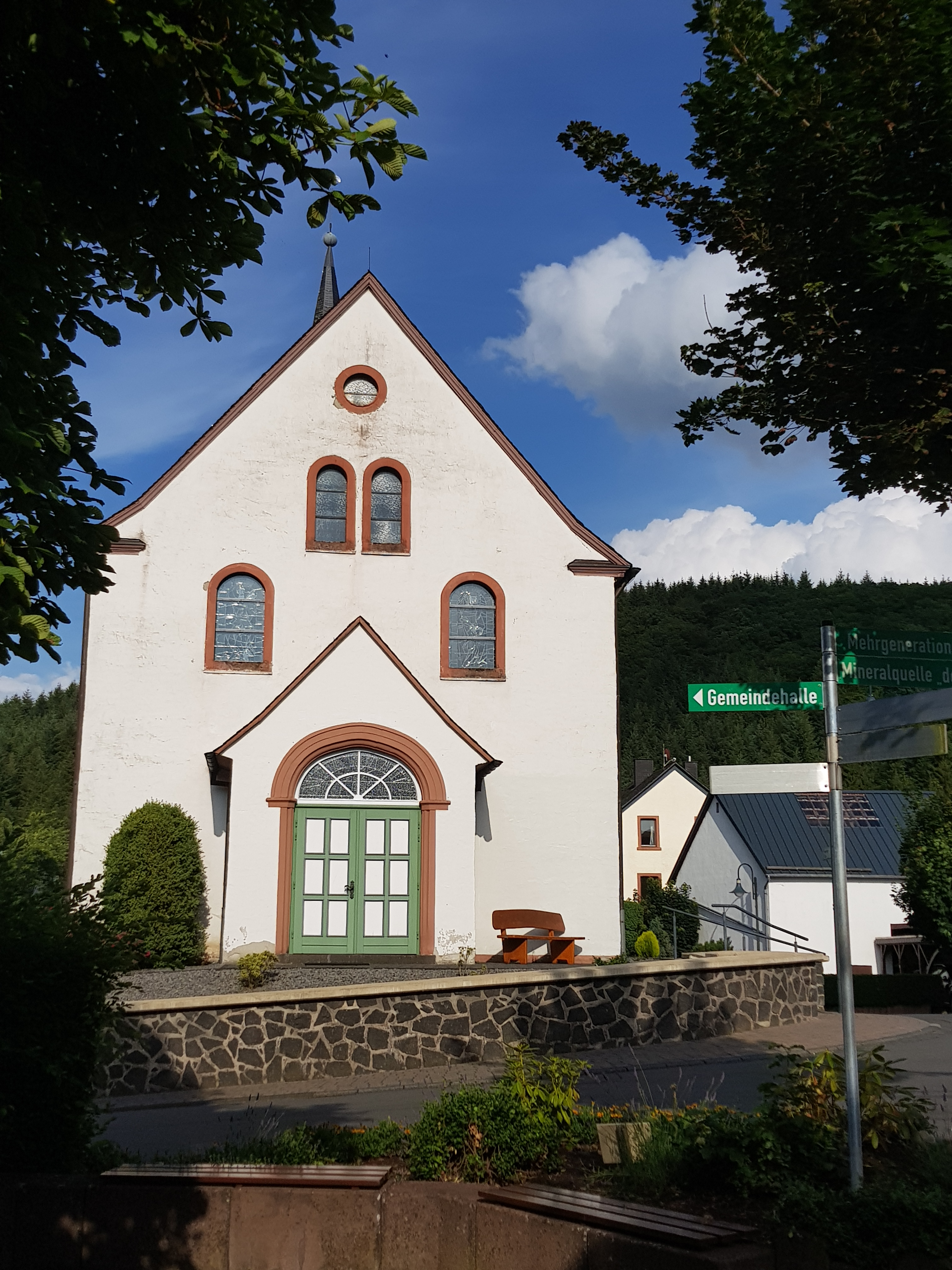

- Coat of arms

- Location of Niederstadtfeld within Vulkaneifel district
- Interactive map of Niederstadtfeld
- Location within Germany Location within Rhineland-Palatinate
- Coordinates: 50°09′34″N 6°45′40″E
- Country: Germany
- State: Rhineland-Palatinate
- District: Vulkaneifel
- Municipal assoc.: Daun

Government
  - Mayor (2019–24): Günter Horten

Area
  - Total: 9.13 km^{2} (3.53 sq mi)
- Elevation: 400 m (1,300 ft)

Population (2025-12-31)
  - Total: 432
  - Density: 47.3/km^{2} (123/sq mi)
- Time zone: UTC+01:00 (CET)
  - Summer (DST): UTC+02:00 (CEST)
- Postal codes: 54570
- Dialling codes: 06596
- Vehicle registration: DAU
- Website: www.niederstadtfeld.de

Niederstadtfeld is an Ortsgemeinde – a municipality belonging to a Verbandsgemeinde, a kind of collective municipality – in the Vulkaneifel district in Rhineland-Palatinate, Germany. It belongs to the Verbandsgemeinde of Daun, whose seat is in the like-named town.

== Geography ==
=== Location ===
The municipality lies in the Volcanic Eifel, a part of the Eifel known for its volcanic history, geographical and geological features. Volcanic activity continues even today, including gases that sometimes well up from the earth.

Niederstadtfeld lies roughly 8 km southwest of Daun, southwestwards towards Bitburg, near Bundesstraße 257, and can be reached directly over Landesstraße (State Road) 27. The original village (now the village centre) stands on a ridge between the Kälberbach and Schwemmbach valleys in a side valley of the Kleine Kyll river.

The Kleine Kyll valley is part of the protected area Zwischen Uess und Kyll. The newer built-up area today stretches farther along the ridge between the Kälberbach and Schwemmbach valleys as well as along the slope of the Kleine Kyll, with the sport complex, the primary school, the Hauptschule and the tennis courts all having been built down in the valley. The Kleine Kyll itself rises above Neroth and empties into the river Lieser downstream from Manderscheid at the Neumühle ("New Mill").

The local elevation ranges from 386 to 420 m above sea level, and the municipality's area is 913 ha, 465 ha of which is wooded and another 345 ha of which is agricultural land.

=== Neighbouring municipalities ===
Niederstadtfeld's neighbours are Bleckhausen, Deudesfeld, Meisburg, Neroth, Oberstadtfeld, Salm, Schutz, Üdersdorf, Wallenborn and Weidenbach.

== History ==
In 1016, the village of Stadefeld ("field on the banks of the Kleine Kyll") had its first documentary mention. In this year, the village was transferred by the Abbot of Prüm, Urold von Daun, as a donation to the newly founded collegiate foundation at Prüm, a deed that was also approved by Emperor Heinrich II. This ownership arrangement found further confirmation in 1136 under Abbot Albero, who appointed Count Bezelino as the Vogt. Thus it could have been that the collegiate foundation lost its grip on Stadefeld because the nobility not only claimed the local lordship, but also contributed to the building of a church, which was first mentioned in 1330.

In 1457, Archbishop Johann II, the Margrave of Baden, in right of the Lordships of Schönecken, enfeoffed the brothers Heinrich, Johann and Friedrich, Lords of Pyrmont and Ehrenberg, with, among other things, holdings and assets, and also with “Stadefeld”. In 1460, Archbishop Johann II took Stadefeld as well as the rest of Heinrich's holdings, people and villages into his protection against payment of a yearly protection fee. The municipality of Niederstadtfeld owned 1469 Morgen (roughly 465 ha) of woodlands, 482 Morgen (roughly 153 ha) of wasteland and wilderness and 10 Morgen (roughly 3 ha) of meadowland and other kinds of land.

In 1565, Archbishop of Trier Johann VI enfeoffed Count Dietrich I of Manderscheid-Kayl, for him and Margaretha von Sombref's other heirs, with, among other things, holdings of the Lords of Pyrmont, including Stadtfeld. Both Niederstadtfeld and Oberstadtfeld belonged to the Electoral-Trier Amt of Manderscheid. Niederstadtfeld had a special court. The parish belonged to the rural chapter of Kyllburg in the Diocese of Trier.

The parish was responsible to either the Count of Manderscheid-Kayl or the Lord of Wiltberg, who took turns in this position. Besides Niederstadtfeld, Oberstadtfeld was also part of this parish. The mill at Niederstadtfeld belonged to the municipality.

In August 1794, fire broke out in the newly built barn at the old rectory, which swiftly spread through the lower village, as most houses there still had thatched roofs. Many houses, barns and stables were destroyed in this fire.

In 1800, a new industry began, sickle making. This afforded many villagers a livelihood. Other industries that cropped up in the 19th century were hatmaking and lead mining. The lead mine's now caved-in shafts can still be seen even today.

In the time that followed the Franco-Prussian War (1870–1871), when great economic need prevailed, many people from Niederstadtfeld emigrated to the United States. Named are the families Pauls, Steffes, Ewen, Weber, Eull and Basten.

About the turn of the 20th century, with the beginnings of industrialization, migration to industrial areas began in Niederstadtfeld, as it likewise did in many other villages. The only livelihoods offered in the village were in forestry, agriculture and the village's two sawmills.

Niederstadtfeld – unlike its neighbour Oberstadtfeld – came through the Second World War relatively unscathed.

In 1955, a ball factory took over the sawmill that once stood on the former Kreisstraße (District Road) 8. Not long afterwards, though – in 1959 – the heat-pressing works, still in business today, set up shop in exactly the same spot.

== Politics ==
=== Municipal council ===
The council is made up of 8 council members, who were elected at the municipal election held on 7 June 2009, and the honorary mayor as chairman.

=== Mayor ===
Niederstadtfeld's mayor is Günter Horten.

=== Coat of arms ===
The German blazon reads: Von Gold, Rot und Silber zweimal geteilt, oben ein roter Zickzackbalken, in der Mitte eine silberne Waage, unten ein blaues Zahnrad.

The municipality's arms might in English heraldic language be described thus: A fess gules charged with balances argent, in chief Or a fess dancetty of three of the first, and in base argent a cogwheel spokeless azure.

Beginning in 1565, Niederstadtfeld belonged to the Counts of Manderscheid and was until 1794 in the Electoral-Trier Amt of Manderscheid. The red fess dancetty (that is, horizontal zigzag stripe) was the charge borne in those lords’ arms. Within the Manderscheid high court, Niederstadtfeld had its own court for Niederstadtfeld, Schutz and Deudesfeld. The balances are meant to document this historical fact. The cogwheel in the lower division of the escutcheon stands for both the earliest beginnings of the handicraft industry in Niederstadtfeld and the industry still found here today.

== Culture and sightseeing ==
=== Buildings ===
- Saint Sebastian’s Catholic Parish Church (Pfarrkirche St. Sebastian), Hauptstraße 14 – tower possibly mediaeval (church first mentioned in 1330), nave 1769, lengthened about 1840, sandstone churchyard cross from 1861.
- Am Mühlscheid – wayside chapel.
- Hauptstraße 8 – Baroque barn, 1795.
- Hauptstraße 17 – Baroque house, 1796.
- Hauptstraße 24 – one-floor Quereinhaus (a combination residential and commercial house divided for these two purposes down the middle, perpendicularly to the street) from 1893.
- Wayside cross, south of the village on the road to Schutz, shaft cross from 1633.
- Former mill at the way into Niederstadtfeld on Landesstraße (State Road) 27 coming from Oberstadtfeld (first mentioned in 1508).

=== Sport and leisure ===
- Since 2007, the Kosmos-Radweg (cycle path) has led from Daun to Meerfeld by way of Niederstadtfeld.

=== Natural monuments ===
- Sour mineral spring (Drees) on Landesstraße 27 going towards Schutz, roughly 50 m from the village.
- Beech tree, trunk circumference 2.50 m, on the edge of the path in the Marschbach valley between Wallenborn and Niederstadtfeld.

== Economy and infrastructure ==
=== Education ===
Niederstadtfeld has a primary school and an all-day Hauptschule.
