= Burberg =

Mountain in Germany

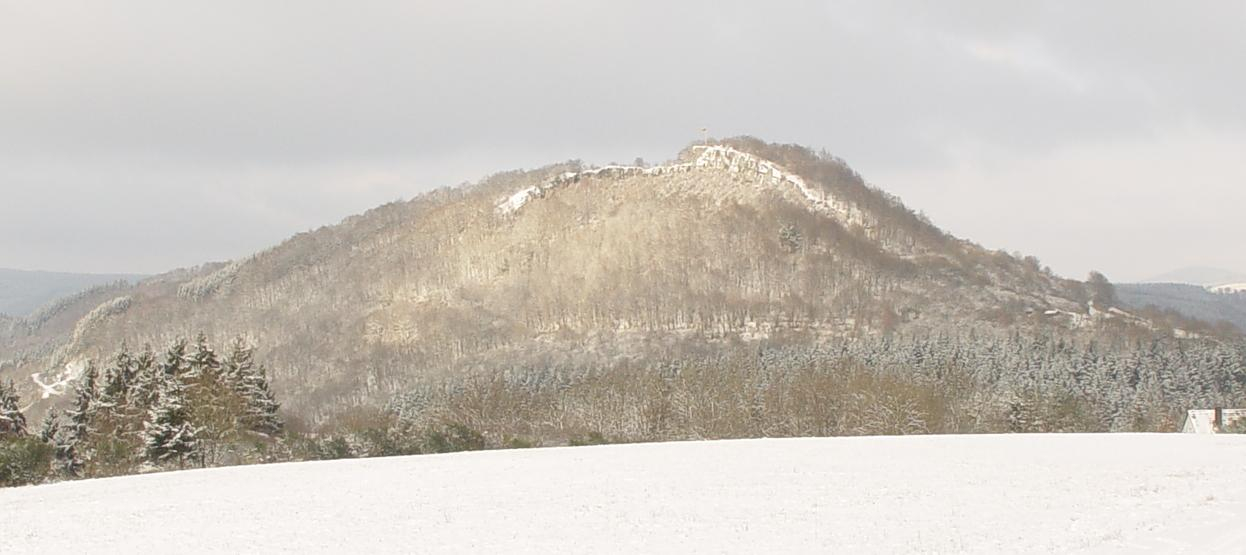
- View of the Burberg from the Schutz to the SE

Highest point
- Elevation: 528.5 m above sea level (NHN) (1,734 ft)
- Coordinates: 50°8′0.3″N 6°45′6″E

Geography
- Location within Rhineland-Palatinate
- Location: Near Schutz; Vulkaneifel, Rhineland-Palatinate (Germany)
- Parent range: Eifel

Geology
- Mountain type: volcano

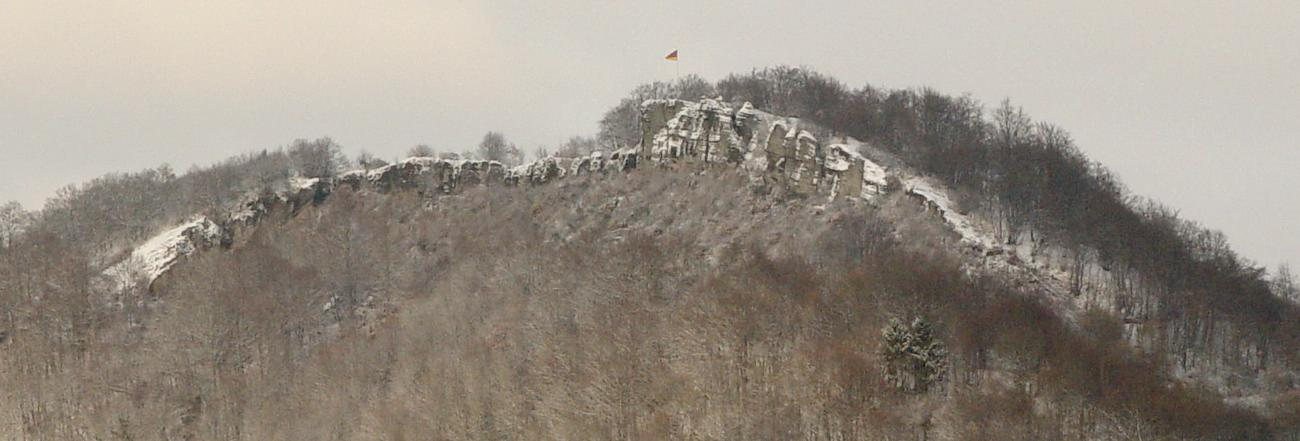
Typical rocks on the summit

The Burberg, also called the Buerberg and Bürberg, is a hill, 528.5 m above sea level (NHN), in the Eifel mountains in Germany. It rises near Schutz in the county of Vulkaneifel in the state of Rhineland-Palatinate.

== Geography ==
=== Location ===
The Burberg is located within the Volcanic Eifel Nature Park and the Hinterbüsch. At its southeastern foot is the village of Schutz on whose territory the hill is situated. 3.1 km west-southwest of the summit is the village of Weidenbach. The Walmerbach (Wallmerbach) stream flows past the hill to the west before discharging in the lee of the hill into the Kleine Kyll which runs from north to south.

=== Natural regions ===
The Burberg is part of the natural region major unit group of East Eifel (no. 27), in major unit Kyllburger Waldeifel (277) and sub-unit Salm Hill Country (Salmer Hügelland) (277.3).

=== Conservation ===
On the hill are parts of the protected landscape of Zwischen Ueß und Kyll (CDDA no. 326012; designated in 1982; 396.2312 km^{2}).

== History ==
The Burberg was formed about 11,000 years ago as a volcano. On the summit region are the remains of a Roman fortification dating to the 4th century AD.

== Literature ==
Karl-Josef Gilles: Der Burberg bei Schutz, Heimatjahrbucharchiv Landkreis Vulkaneifel, Projekt der Kreisverwaltung Vulkaneifel und dem Weiss-Verlag, Büro Daun, 1984, p. 211
