= Sarmersbach =

- Municipality
- Coat of arms

- Location of Sarmersbach within Vulkaneifel district
- Interactive map of Sarmersbach
- Location within Germany Location within Rhineland-Palatinate
- Coordinates: 50°14′32″N 6°52′55″E
- Country: Germany
- State: Rhineland-Palatinate
- District: Vulkaneifel
- Municipal assoc.: Daun

Government
  - Mayor (2019–24): Dieter Treis

Area
  - Total: 5.19 km^{2} (2.00 sq mi)
- Elevation: 470 m (1,540 ft)

Population (2025-12-31)
  - Total: 179
  - Density: 34.5/km^{2} (89.3/sq mi)
- Time zone: UTC+01:00 (CET)
  - Summer (DST): UTC+02:00 (CEST)
- Postal codes: 54552
- Dialling codes: 06592
- Vehicle registration: DAU
- Website: www.sarmersbach.de

Sarmersbach is an Ortsgemeinde – a municipality belonging to a Verbandsgemeinde, a kind of collective municipality – in the Vulkaneifel district in Rhineland-Palatinate, Germany. It belongs to the Verbandsgemeinde of Daun, whose seat is in the like-named town.

== Geography ==
The municipality lies in the Vulkaneifel, a part of the Eifel known for its volcanic history, geographical and geological features, and even ongoing activity today, including gases that sometimes well up from the earth.

Sarmersbach is in the traditional parochial area known as the Struth. The municipality's namesake river, the Sarmersbach, rises within its bounds, emptying into the river Lieser at Nerdlen.

== History ==
Sarmersbach had its first documentary mention only in 1316, but its founding may be placed in Frankish times in the 9th and 10th centuries. Even earlier than that, however, Celts and Romans had settled the broad fields. Archaeological finds from a small Roman temple in the “Auf den Steinen” area can today be found in the State Museum in Trier. Right near Sarmersbach ran the former Roman road between Trier and Cologne. An ancient indulgence cross, the so-called Afelskreuz, today stands at a prominent spot, an historical procession point, and nowadays a destination for many hikers and also worshippers.

Sarmersbach experienced Germany's long history in microcosm in the Middle Ages. They were held by both secular lords, such as the Castle Lords of Daun, the Lords of Winneburg and the Lords of Brohl, and ecclesiastical ones such as the Archbishopric of Trier and Springiersbach Abbey, under whom the unfree peasants toiled away at compulsory labour and paid their tithes. Sarmersbach's great importance in days of yore in the middle of the Struth villages can also be seen in the 14th-century Schöffenstuhl. This was the seat of seven elected Schöffen (roughly “lay jurists”), who along with their 49 colleagues in Daun and the Daun Amtmann or the Archbishop of Trier held the assizes several times each year, meting out justice for the Amt of Daun.

The Thirty Years' War with its attendant devastating Plague brought death to half the villagers. Almost the whole 17th century with its violent disputes between various lordly houses brought neediness, suffering and misery to the poverty-stricken Struth.

After the French Revolution, the Eifel, and thereby Sarmersbach too, were ceded to France. The French administration made Sarmersbach the administrative seat of the like-named mairie (“mayoralty”), to which belonged not only Sarmersbach but also Beinhausen, Boxberg, Kradenbach, Gefell, Hörschhausen, Katzwinkel, Neichen, Nerdlen, Schönbach and Utzerath. This arrangement persisted into Prussian times in 1815 after the Congress of Vienna (although the German-speaking Prussians called it a Bürgermeisterei, also meaning “mayoralty”). The Prussians also grouped Sarmersbach into the Daun district in the Rhineland, and this arrangement lasted until the mid-1920s. Ever since, Sarmersbach has been administered by the Bürgermeisterei – later the Verbandsgemeinde – of Daun.

Sarmersbach was until the late 1960s a rural farming village. Since then, agriculture has undergone a swift change in structure. While there were still 4,216 agricultural businesses in the Daun district (now the Vulkaneifel district) in 1971, by 2000 there were fewer than 1,500. In Sarmersbach, there is still a very big computer-driven dairy farm and a Demeter operation, recognized as good. Changes in agriculture were paralleled by changes in the face of the village. The once characteristic timber-frame buildings have almost without exception disappeared. New town developments are also attracting newcomers to Sarmersbach.

=== Religion ===
The citizens of Sarmersbach are roughly 90% Roman Catholic and belong to the Catholic parish of St. Hubertus Beinhausen with its Hilgerath parish church. In earlier times, believers from Sarmersbach needed to walk several kilometres to take part in church services in great numbers.

== Politics ==
=== Municipal council ===
The council is made up of 6 council members, who were elected at the municipal election held on 7 June 2009, and the honorary mayor as chairman.

=== Mayor ===
Sarmersbach's mayor is Dieter Treis, and his deputies are Gottfried Lenarz and Josef Weber.

=== Coat of arms ===
The German blazon reads: Schild durch einen silbernen Wellenbalken geteilt, oben in Rot ein silbernes Balkenkreuz, unten in Grün ein silberner, hersehender Hirschkopf mit Kreuz.

The municipality's arms might in English heraldic language be described thus: A fess wavy argent between gules a cross of the first and vert a stag's head caboshed ensigned with a Latin cross between the attires of the first.

The wavy fess (horizontal stripe) represents the village's namesake brook, the Sarmersbach. The silver cross on the red field above this refers to Sarmersbach's former inclusion in the Electoral-Trier Amt of Daun. Below the wavy fess is a stag's head with a Latin cross on top, Saint Hubert’s attribute, thus representing the parish's patron saint. The arms have been borne since 1984.

== Culture and sightseeing ==
Buildings:

- Saint Nicholas’s Catholic Church (branch church; Filialkirche St. Nikolaus), Hauptstraße 10 – biaxial aisleless church, from 1788.
- Hauptstraße/corner of Bergstraße – wayside cross, basalt shaft cross from 1762.
