= Little Kyll =

River in Germany

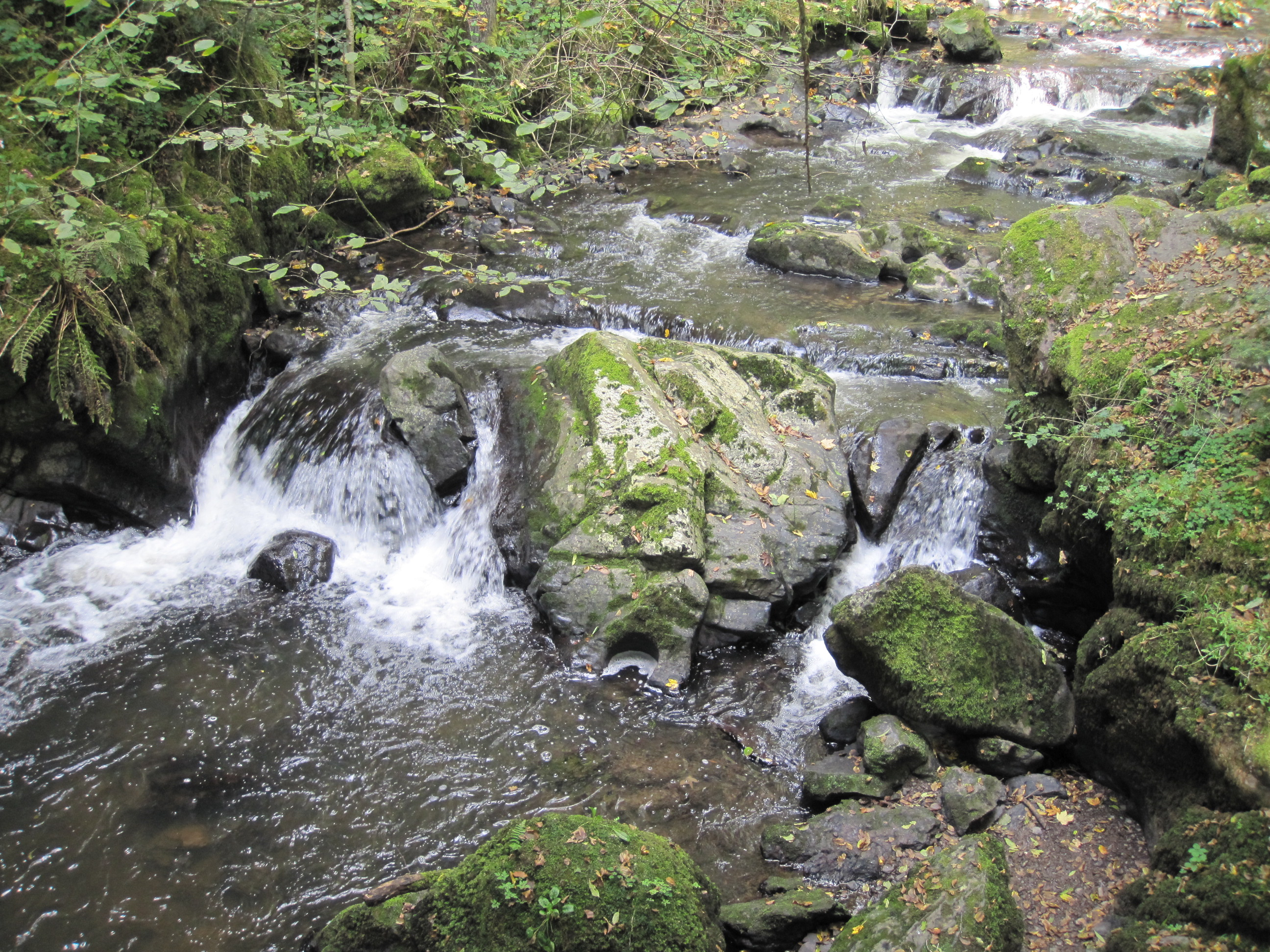
- Waterfall near the Wolfsschlucht gorge

Location
- Country: Germany
- State: Rhineland-Palatinate
- Districts: Vulkaneifel; Bernkastel-Wittlich
- Reference no.: DE: 26784

Physical characteristics
- Source
  - location: On the heights of the Neroth woods in the county of Vulkaneifel
  - coordinates: 50°12′37″N 6°45′36″E
  - elevation: ca. 584 m above sea level (NHN)
- Mouth
  - location: Discharges south of Manderscheid into the Lieser
  - coordinates: 50°03′48″N 6°48′51″E
  - elevation: ca. 246 m above sea level (NHN)
- Length: 23.879 km (14.838 mi)
- Basin size: 83.545 km^{2} (32.257 sq mi)

Basin features
- Progression: Lieser→ Moselle→ Rhine→ North Sea
- Landmarks: Villages: Neroth, Oberstadtfeld, Niederstadtfeld, Schutz
- Tributaries
  - left: See table
  - right: See table
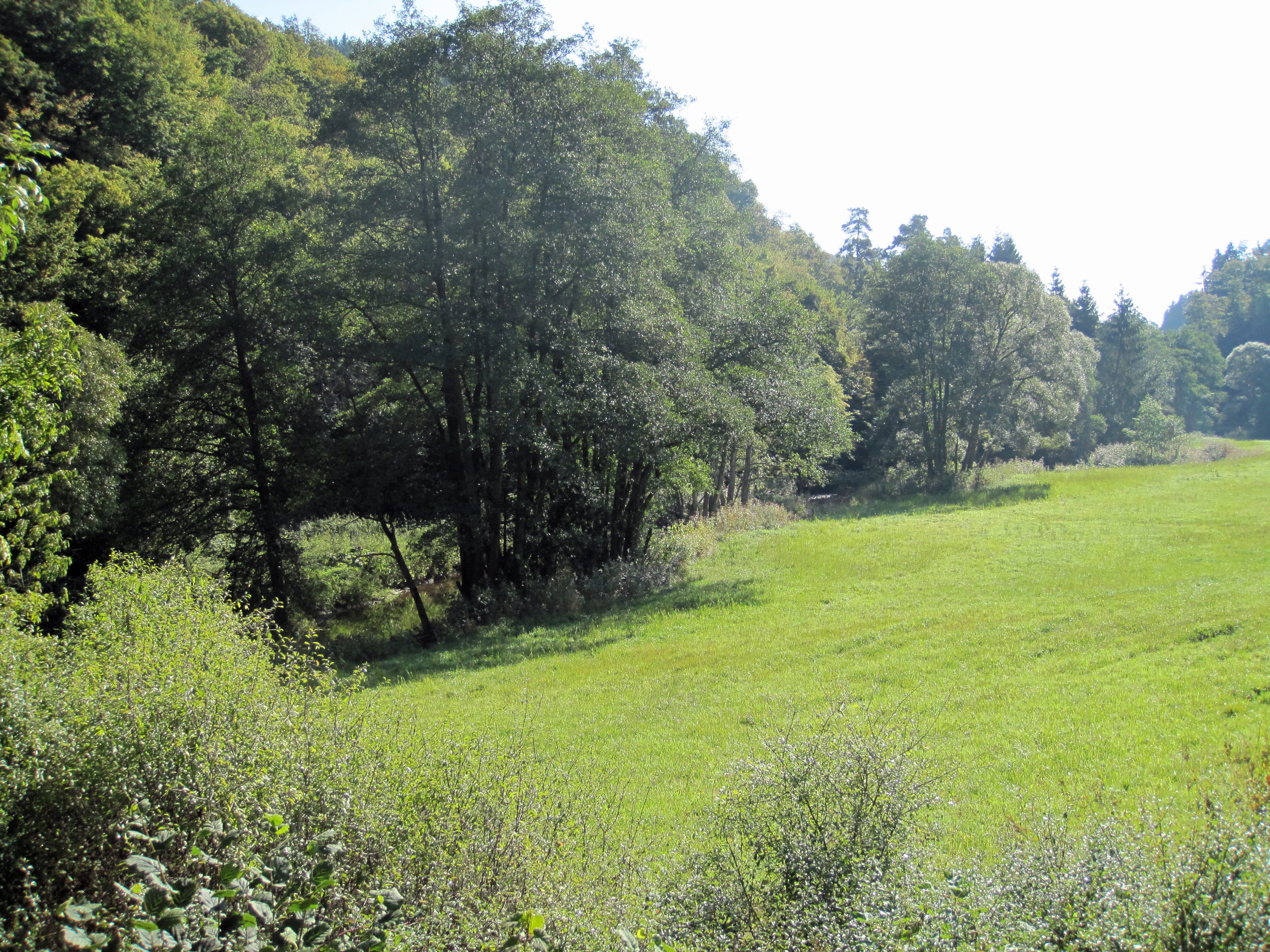
- Valley of the Kleine Kyll south of its confluence with the Meerbach

The Little Kyll German: Kleine Kyll, pronounced: "kill") is a 23.9-kilometre-long (14.9 mi) orographically right-hand tributary of the Lieser.

== Geography ==
=== Course ===
The Little Kyll rises 2 kilometres (1.2 mi) northeast of Neroth on the heights of the Neroth woods in the county of Vulkaneifel in the German state of Rhineland-Palatinate. It flows in a southerly direction through the municipalities of Neroth, Oberstadtfeld, Niederstadtfeld and Schutz and empties into the Lieser south of Manderscheid, Bernkastel-Wittlich.

=== Tributaries ===
The tributaries of the Little Kyll include the following (in a downstream direction):

Name	GKZ	Length (km)	Direction	Confluene after km	Location
Enzenbach	2678412	2.6	right	21.3	Neroth
Kreuzbach	26784132	0.8	right	20.5	
Dehmbach		1.0	right	19.7	
Bach vom Birkenberg (Winkelbach)	2678414	1.5	left	18.2	Oberstadtfeld
Risselbach		1.3	left	16.6	Niederstadtfeld
Kälberbach	2678416	3.9	right	16.2	Niederstadtfeld
Kerlbach		1.0	left	15.2	Niederstadtfeld
Walmerbach	267842	7.2	right	11.9	Schutz
Speicherbach	267844	3.5	right	10.0	
Meerbach	267846	4.2	right	6.3	Meerfeld
Ellbach	26784712	2.0	right	4.7	
Dombach		1.0	left	2.6	Manderscheid
Horngraben	2678472	2.5	right	1.9	
Fischbach	267848	6.1	right	0.8	

== Recreation ==
In the area between Oberstadtfeld and Bleckhausener Mühle/Meerfeld the cycleway Kosmosradweg runs parallel to the Kleine Kyll.

At the confluence with the Horngraben, south of Manderscheid is the gorge of Wolfsschlucht as well as a waterfall.

== See also ==
- List of rivers of Rhineland-Palatinate
