= Beinhausen =

- Municipality
- Coat of arms

- Location of Beinhausen within Vulkaneifel district
- Interactive map of Beinhausen
- Location within Germany Location within Rhineland-Palatinate
- Coordinates: 50°16′03″N 6°53′12″E
- Country: Germany
- State: Rhineland-Palatinate
- District: Vulkaneifel
- Municipal assoc.: Kelberg

Government
  - Mayor (2019–24): Eva Saxler

Area
  - Total: 2.63 km^{2} (1.02 sq mi)
- Elevation: 482 m (1,581 ft)

Population (2025-12-31)
  - Total: 86
  - Density: 33/km^{2} (85/sq mi)
- Time zone: UTC+01:00 (CET)
  - Summer (DST): UTC+02:00 (CEST)
- Postal codes: 54552
- Dialling codes: 02692
- Vehicle registration: DAU
- Website: www.beinhausen.de

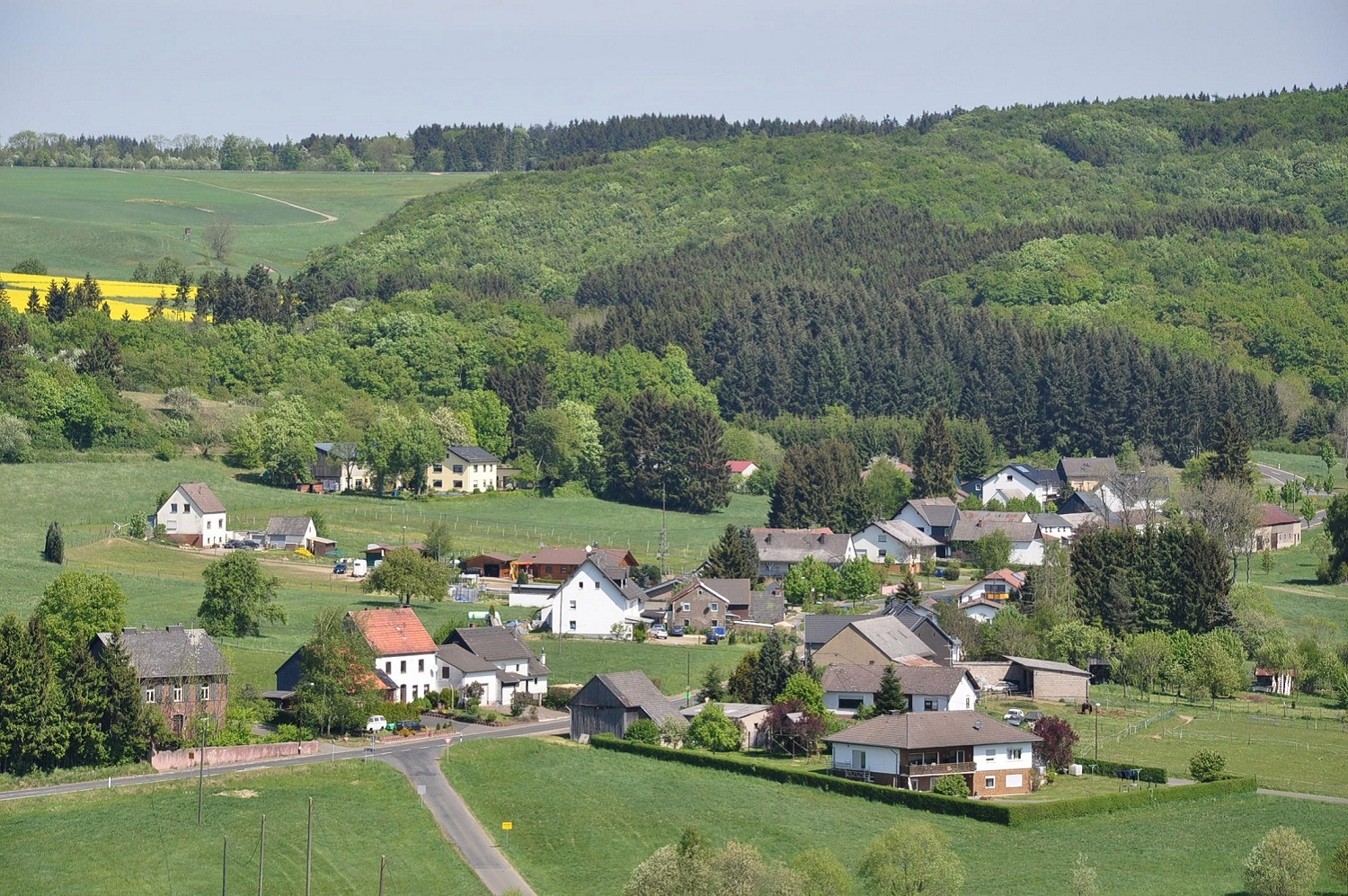
Beinhausen

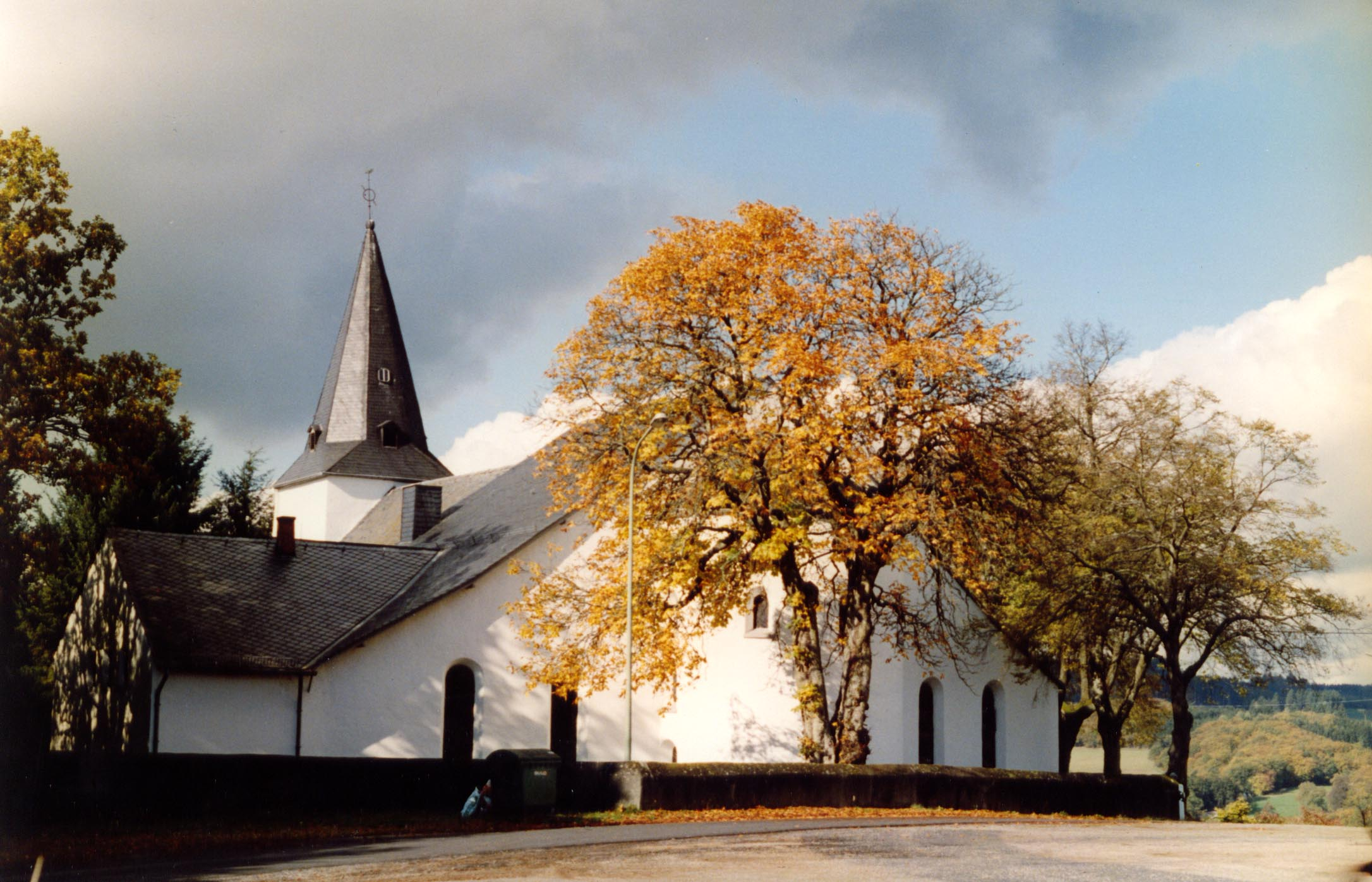
Hilgerath church near Beinhausen

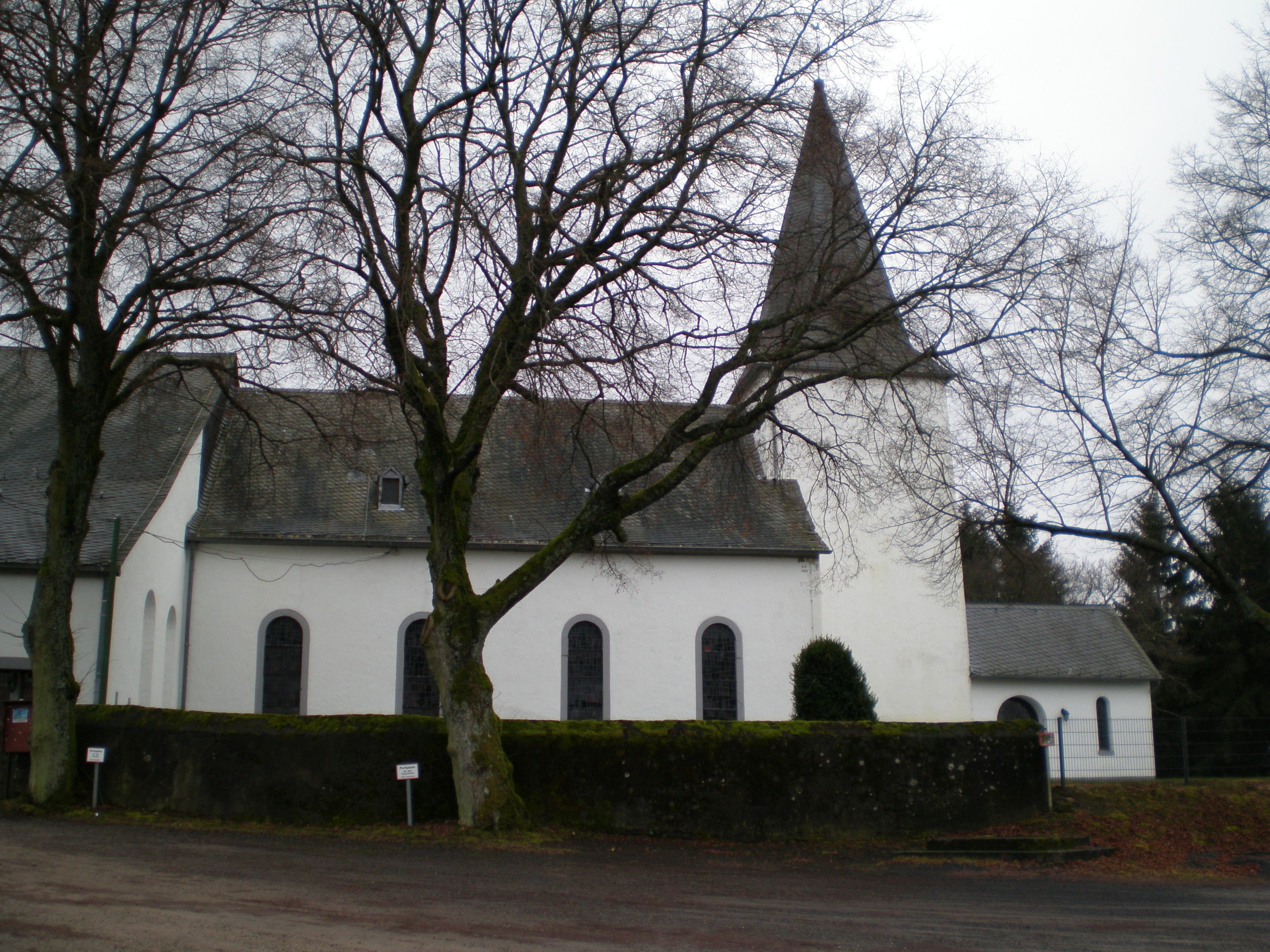
Another view of Hilgerath Church

Beinhausen is an Ortsgemeinde – a municipality belonging to a Verbandsgemeinde, a kind of collective municipality – in the Vulkaneifel district in Rhineland-Palatinate, Germany. It belongs to the Verbandsgemeinde of Kelberg, whose seat is in the like-named municipality.

== Geography ==
The municipality lies in the Eifel between Kelberg and Daun on the river Lieser, and more specifically in the Vulkaneifel, a part of the Eifel known for its volcanic history, geographical and geological features, and even ongoing activity today, including gases that sometimes well up from the earth.

== History ==
In the Middle Ages, Beinhausen belonged to the Amt of Daun in the Electorate of Trier. On 10 August 1290, Beinhausen had its first documentary mention as Beinchenhusen. A later source speaks of Beyirhusen, and later still, a 1504 purchase agreement names a one “Clais van Beyhusen” as well as the “Kirchenmeister (a title now no longer used, but akin to “sexton”) from Hilgenrait”. Under Prussian administration, the municipality was in the Bürgermeisterei (“Mayoralty”) of Sarmersbach. Beinhausen is overwhelmingly Catholic and is the parochial seat of the Parish of St. Hubertus Beinhausen, to which, besides Beinhausen itself, belong the villages of Boxberg, Neichen, Kradenbach, Nerdlen, Sarmersbach and Gefell. Until the early 20th century, Katzwinkel also belonged to the Hilgerath parish (as it was once known). The Beinhausen parish area is also commonly called Struth.

The Hilgerath parish church, standing alone on the mountain within Neichen's municipal limits, has been parish church since days of yore. The tower is known from its design to be from the mid 15th century; the main nave has existed in its current form since 1804. In 1950, the church was widened with two side naves.

In more recent times, the return of the Hilgerath Gnadenbild (variously translated “holy picture” or “image of grace”, among others), Beweinung Christi (“Lamentation of Christ”) from the mid 15th century might be noted in the history books. This had been stolen from the parish church in a burglary in 1975 and thereafter its whereabouts were unknown. In 1994, Bernhard Euteneuer, who from 1992 to 2000 was the Beinhausen parish priest, managed to fetch the valuable Gnadenbild back to Hilgerath from Biberach an der Riß, where it had resurfaced. To show their thankfulness, the Struth Catholics have ever since undertaken a yearly pilgrimage in which they converge on Hilgerath, always on the Sunday after the Feast of the Cross (14 September).

In the course of municipal restructuring in Rhineland-Palatinate, the municipality was assigned in 1970 to the Verbandsgemeinde of Kelberg.

=== Religion ===
More than 90% of the inhabitants belong to the Roman Catholic Church.

== Politics ==
=== Municipal council ===
The council is made up of 6 council members, who were elected by majority vote at the municipal election held on 7 June 2009, and the honorary mayor as chairman.

=== Coat of arms ===
The German blazon reads: In Silber ein grüner Berg, darin ein silberenes Haus, darüber ein schwarzer, hersehender Hirschkopf mit rotem Kreuz.

The municipality's arms might in English heraldic language be described thus: Argent in base a mount vert surmounted by a house of the field, above the mount a stag's head caboshed sable, between his attires a Latin cross gules.

The stag's head and the cross are references to Saint Hubert, the parish's patron saint. The green mount in base is meant to represent the hill of Hilgerath, upon which the parish church stands. The house surmounting the mount is meant to represent the village of Beinhausen, which lies at the foot of the hill. It also symbolizes the placename element —hausen. The municipality's name is reckoned to be a form of bei den Häusern – “at the houses”.

== Culture and sightseeing ==
=== Buildings ===
- Bergstraße 2 – timber-frame house, partly solid.
