= Boxberg =

Boxberg may refer to several places in Germany:

- Heidelberg-Boxberg, a district of the city of Heidelberg
- Boxberg, Baden-Württemberg, a town in Baden-Württemberg
- Boxberg, Saxony, a municipality in Upper Lusatia, Saxony
  - the Boxberg Power Station located there
- Boxberg, Rhineland-Palatinate, a municipality in Rhineland-Palatinate
