= Üdersdorf =

- Municipality
- Coat of arms

- Location of Üdersdorf within Vulkaneifel district
- Interactive map of Üdersdorf
- Location within Germany Location within Rhineland-Palatinate
- Coordinates: 50°09′11″N 6°48′12″E
- Country: Germany
- State: Rhineland-Palatinate
- District: Vulkaneifel
- Municipal assoc.: Daun

Government
  - Mayor (2019–24): Günter Altmeier

Area
  - Total: 17.47 km^{2} (6.75 sq mi)
- Elevation: 438 m (1,437 ft)

Population (2025-12-31)
  - Total: 1,057
  - Density: 60.50/km^{2} (156.7/sq mi)
- Time zone: UTC+01:00 (CET)
  - Summer (DST): UTC+02:00 (CEST)
- Postal codes: 54552
- Dialling codes: 06596
- Vehicle registration: DAU
- Website: www.uedersdorf.de

Üdersdorf is an Ortsgemeinde – a municipality belonging to a Verbandsgemeinde, a kind of collective municipality – in the Vulkaneifel district in Rhineland-Palatinate, Germany. It belongs to the Verbandsgemeinde of Daun, whose seat is in the like-named town.

== Geography ==
=== Location ===
The municipality lies in the Vulkaneifel, a part of the Eifel known for its volcanic history, geographical and geological features, and even ongoing activity today, including gases that sometimes well up from the earth.

Üdersdorf is a state-recognized recreational resort (Erholungsort) with many hiking trails in its wooded surroundings.

The maars (crater lakes) and the Lieser valley are right nearby. Not much farther away lie the spa towns of Daun and Manderscheid as well as the Nürburgring.

=== Constituent communities ===
Üdersdorf's two outlying Ortsteile are Tettscheid and Trittscheid.

== History ==
In 1287, Üdersdorf had its first documentary mention in a donation document in which the earnings from the village of Oistersdorf were transferred to Himmerod Abbey. In 1563, twelve “hearths”, or households, and some 70 inhabitants were counted in Üdersdorf; Trittscheid and Tettscheid had seven households each.

Until 1794, the village belonged to the Electoral-Trier Amt of Daun. In the time of French rule, Üdersdorf was the seat of a mairie (“mayoralty”). When Prussia took over the Rhineland, to which Üdersdorf then belonged, after the Congress of Vienna, the village passed to the then newly formed Daun district in 1815 or 1816 and was the seat of a Bürgermeisterei (also “mayoralty”) in the Amt of Daun. To this mayoralty belonged the villages of Uederdorf with the Uederdorfer Mühle (mills), Nieder-Stattfeld, Ober-Stattfeld, Trettscheid, Trittscheid and Weyersbach (Weiersbach, today an outlying centre of Daun). In 1878, the seat of the Amt was moved to Niederstadtfeld.

The village had its first chapel quite early on. In 1717, a church consecrated to Bartholomew the Apostle was built on the spot. Today's church was built in the 1860s. A local parochial school is known to have existed beginning in 1769. The first schoolhouse was built in 1824. In 1936, the school building still used as a primary school now was built.

On 1 January 1971, the formerly self-administering municipalities of Tettscheid (132 inhabitants) and Trittscheid (148 inhabitants) were amalgamated with Üdersdorf.

== Politics ==
=== Municipal council ===
The council is made up of 16 council members, who were elected by majority vote at the municipal election held on 7 June 2009, and the honorary mayor as chairman.

=== Mayor ===
Üdersdorf's mayor is Günter Altmeier.

=== Coat of arms ===
The German blazon reads: Unter goldenem Schildhaupt, darin ein rotes Schräggitter, durch silbernen, schräglinken Wellenbalken geteilten grünen Schild, oben eine silberne Säge, unten drei silberne Ähren, mit einer silbernen Sichel belegt.

The municipality's arms might in English heraldic language be described thus: Vert a bend sinister wavy argent, dexter a saw bendwise sinister of the same, the handles proper, and sinister three ears of wheat Or surmounted bendwise by a sickle of the second, the handle proper, on a chief of the third two bars gules fretty.

The “fretwork” in the chief is taken from the arms once borne by the knight de Palacio, who was the one who gave Üdersdorf its first documentary mention. The bend sinister wavy (slanted wavy stripe) symbolizes the river Lieser. The saw stands for Üdersdorf's, Tettscheid's and Trittscheid's artisanal beginnings and is also Saint Joseph’s attribute; Joseph being patron saint of craftsmen, among others. The three ears of wheat and the sickle refer to agriculture’s importance as the main source of food for people in all three centres for centuries.

=== Town partnerships ===
Üdersdorf fosters partnerships with the following places:

- Junglinster, Grevenmacher, Luxembourg since 1987.

== Culture and sightseeing ==
=== Buildings ===
==== Üdersdorf ====
- Saint Bartholomew's Catholic Parish Church (Pfarrkirche St. Bartholomäus), Manderscheider Straße 3 – basalt and sandstone Classicist aisleless church, 1863.
- Near Aarleystraße 1 – former bakehouse, one-floor quarrystone building, 19th century?
- Alte Schulstraße 8 – former school, plastered building, apparently from 1860, one-floor classroom built onto the back (older?).
- Auf dem Berg 17 – two-floor solid building, 1865.
- Dauner Straße 8 – Quereinhaus (a combination residential and commercial house divided for these two purposes down the middle, perpendicularly to the street), latter half of the 19th century.
- Manderscheider Straße 1 – two-floor plastered building.

==== Tettscheid ====
- Saint Josse’s Catholic Church (branch church; Filialkirche St. Jodocus), Im Dorf 1 – aisleless church from 1904.
- Im Dorf 16 – estate along street, house, from 1801.

==== Trittscheid ====
- Artesian well, latter half of the 19th century.
