= Oberstadtfeld =

- Municipality
- Coat of arms

- Location of Oberstadtfeld within Vulkaneifel district
- Interactive map of Oberstadtfeld
- Location within Germany Location within Rhineland-Palatinate
- Coordinates: 50°10′32″N 6°46′12″E
- Country: Germany
- State: Rhineland-Palatinate
- District: Vulkaneifel
- Municipal assoc.: Daun

Government
  - Mayor (2019–24): Hubert Molitor

Area
  - Total: 10.21 km^{2} (3.94 sq mi)
- Elevation: 440 m (1,440 ft)

Population (2025-12-31)
  - Total: 524
  - Density: 51.3/km^{2} (133/sq mi)
- Time zone: UTC+01:00 (CET)
  - Summer (DST): UTC+02:00 (CEST)
- Postal codes: 54570
- Dialling codes: 06596
- Vehicle registration: DAU

Oberstadtfeld is an Ortsgemeinde – a municipality belonging to a Verbandsgemeinde, a kind of collective municipality – in the Vulkaneifel district in Rhineland-Palatinate, Germany. It belongs to the Verbandsgemeinde of Daun, whose seat is in the like-named town.

== Geography ==
=== Location ===
Oberstadtfeld lies 6 km southwest of Daun on Bundesstraße 257 in the valley of the Kleine Kyll river in the Volcanic Eifel, a part of the Eifel known for its volcanic history, geographical and geological features, and even ongoing activity today, including gases that sometimes well up from the earth.

=== Neighbouring municipalities ===
Oberstadtfeld's neighbours are Pützborn (a constituent community of Daun), Neroth, Niederstadtfeld, Üdersdorf and Wallenborn.

=== Geology ===
Among geologists, Oberstadtfeld is well known for its varied fossils from an eventful geological past. Remnants of long-gone lifeforms, which have been preserved despite all the changes that have taken place in the rocks, show that the stone underlying the municipality is made up of marine deposits from the Lower Devonian. The fossils come from the Devonian Sea, as geologists call it, which covered not only the Eifel but also broad areas of Central Europe too, roughly 400 to 340 million years ago. Several lava flows and a dried-up maar kettle to the right of the road on the way to Üdersdorf bear witness to volcanic activity many millennia ago.

Climatic swings

=== Climate ===
Yearly precipitation in Oberstadtfeld amounts to 890 mm, falling into the highest fourth of the precipitation chart for all Germany. The driest month is April. The most rainfall comes in December. In that month, precipitation is 1.6 times what it is in April.

== History ==
In 1242, Oberstadtfeld had its first direct documentary mention in a partition document between the Count of Daun and Himmerod Abbey. Further documents dealing with tenancy agreements with the Lords of Castle Pyrmont come from 1392, 1447 and 1460.

About 1500, a two-naved church with middle supports was built in Oberstadtfeld. From 1503 comes a tenancy agreement with Pyrmont dealing with the mill; it was still using Pyrmont measurements up until 1780. The first available taxation roll from Oberstadtfeld in the Amt of Obermanderscheid comes from 1654. Forty-four years later, in 1698, as can be seen in a tenancy agreement, there were four Electoral estates at Oberstadtfeld: the Achterhof, the Hühnerhof, the Hundswinklerhof and the Heinenhof.

From 1787 comes the first population figure for Oberstadtfeld, which was then home to 251 inhabitants.

In 1794, the Eifel passed to France and was in the new Department of Sarre, and beginning in 1803, Oberstadtfeld was part of the parish of Niederstadtfeld in the Diocese of Trier. Formerly it had belonged to the greater parish of Steinborn in the Eifel deaconry in the Archdiocese of Cologne.

In 1808, the Oberstadtfeld mill was auctioned for 1,775 French francs to Matthias Irmen.

In 1815, the Eifel passed to Prussia. Oberstadtfeld's old church was replaced with a new nave between 1837 and 1841 after it had fallen into disrepair. The old tower, however, stayed standing.

In 1840, the register of inhabitants listed 356 villagers by name. In 1888, the Heiligenhäuschen (a small, shrinelike structure consecrated to a saint or saints) in the Mark valley on the road to Niederstadtfeld was built by Friedrich Hein as thanks for a healthy homecoming from the Franco-Prussian War.

Great parts of Oberstadtfeld were destroyed in the early 20th century when 17 houses along with stables and barns were lost to a fire. Crown Prince Wilhelm visited Oberstadtfeld after the fire, on the occasion of a journey through the Eifel. Towards the end of the Second World War, in 1944 and 1945, Oberstadtfeld was bombed in air raids three times. Twenty-eight civilians were killed.

== Politics ==
=== Municipal council ===
The council is made up of 12 council members, who were elected by majority vote at the municipal election held on 7 June 2009, and the honorary mayor as chairman.

=== Mayor ===
Oberstadtfeld's mayor is Hubert Molitor.

=== Coat of arms ===
The German blazon reads: Durch blauen, schrägrechten Stufenbalken geteilt. Vorne in Silber eine Scheune mit schwarzem Dach, hinten in Gold eine rote Flamme.

The municipality's arms might in English heraldic language be described thus: A bend indented azure between argent a barn with roof sable and Or fire gules.

The unusual bend (diagonal stripe) is taken from the arms formerly borne by the Lords of Pyrmont. In 1392, Werner von Falkenstein, the Archbishop of Trier, made it known that he had leased Oberstadtfeld and Weidenbach from Lyse von Lussenich, Widow of Pyrmont, although these two villages were to pass on Werner's death back to Heinrich of Pyrmont.

Once more, in 1447, another Heinrich of Pyrmont stated that he still owned the villages of Stadtfeld, and in 1503, too. A further important indicator of the lordly influence is that Pyrmont measurements were used at the Oberstadtfeld mill until 1780. The barn on the dexter (armsbearer's right, viewer's left) side is meant to refer to the four Electoral estates at Oberstadtfeld, the Achterhof, the Hühnerhof, the Hundswinklerhof and the Heinenhof. The state archive holds leasing protocols dealing with these estates from 1698 and 1792.

The red flame on the sinister (armsbearer's left, viewer's right) side is Saint Brigid's attribute, thus representing the municipality's and the church's patron saint.

== Culture and sightseeing ==
=== Buildings ===
- Saint Brigid's Catholic Church (branch church; Filialkirche St. Brigida), Hauptstraße 36 – Classicist aisleless church, 1837, Late Gothic west tower, about 1500; sandstone churchyard cross from 1726 and 1877; warriors’ memorial, 1914-1918, addition from 1945.
- Hauptstraße 30 – one-floor timber-frame house with knee wall, partly solid, from 1812 (?), parts possibly older.
- Hauptstraße 34 – former school, plastered building, from 1807.
- Hauptstraße 42 – half-house from 1801, quarrystone commercial building from 1897
- On the nearby mountain, Nerother Kopf, a castle ruin named Freudenkoppe; nearby, a millstone quarry.

=== Natural monuments ===
- Sour mineral spring (Drees), roughly 1 km from the village.
