= Bleckhausen =

- Municipality
- Location of Bleckhausen within Vulkaneifel district
- Interactive map of Bleckhausen
- Location within Germany Location within Rhineland-Palatinate
- Coordinates: 50°7′31″N 6°46′34″E
- Country: Germany
- State: Rhineland-Palatinate
- District: Vulkaneifel
- Municipal assoc.: Daun

Government
  - Mayor (2019–24): Markus Göbel

Area
  - Total: 6.32 km^{2} (2.44 sq mi)
- Elevation: 470 m (1,540 ft)

Population (2025-12-31)
  - Total: 281
  - Density: 44.5/km^{2} (115/sq mi)
- Time zone: UTC+01:00 (CET)
  - Summer (DST): UTC+02:00 (CEST)
- Postal codes: 54570
- Dialling codes: 06572
- Vehicle registration: DAU

Bleckhausen (in Eifel dialect: Blääkes) is an Ortsgemeinde – a municipality belonging to a Verbandsgemeinde, a kind of collective municipality – in the Vulkaneifel district in Rhineland-Palatinate, Germany. It belongs to the Verbandsgemeinde of Daun, whose seat is in the like-named town.

== Geography ==
=== Location ===
The municipality lies southeast of Weidenbach between the Kleine Kyll and the Lieser in the Volcanic Eifel, a part of the Eifel known for its volcanic history, geographical and geological features, and even ongoing activity today, including gases that sometimes well up from the earth.

Southeast of the village lies the nature conservation area Wacholdergelände bei Bleckhausen (“Juniper Lands near Bleckhausen”), the biggest of its kind anywhere in the Eifel.

== History ==
On 15 June 1354, Bleckhausen had its first documentary mention when Archbishop of Trier Bohemond II (1354–1362) acknowledged the chapel at Bleckhausen built under Archbishop Baldwin (1307–1354). The village belonged to the Electoral-Trier Amt of Manderscheid. In 1721, there were 25 inhabitants in Bleckhausen.

During the time of French administration, Bleckhausen was raised to parish; formerly, it was parochially bound with Manderscheid. Schutz was also assigned to the parish of Bleckhausen.

== Politics ==
=== Municipal council ===
The council is made up of 8 council members, who were elected by majority vote at the municipal election held on 7 June 2009, and the honorary mayor as chairman.

=== Coat of arms ===
The German blazon reads: In Silber ein roter Schrägrechtsbalken, belegt mit einer goldenen Zickzackleiste; oben ein schwarzes Antoniuskreuz, unten drei blaue Wellenleisten.

The municipality’s arms might in English heraldic language be described thus: Argent a bend gules surmounted by a bendlet dancetty Or, in sinister a cross tau sable and in dexter three bars wavy azure.

The bend (diagonal stripe) overlaid with the thinner zigzag stripe (“bendlet dancetty”) was inspired by the arms once borne by the Counts of Manderscheid, once and long Bleckhausen’s lords. The T-shaped cross is Saint Anthony’s cross, and thus a reference to the local patron saint. The bars represent both the municipal limits and the charming pastoral scenery, characterized by the Kleine Kyll, Waldbach and Trombach valleys.

== Culture and sightseeing ==
=== Buildings ===
- Belonging to the municipality is the Bleckhausener Mühle, a gristmill under monumental protection on the Kleine Kyll southwest of the village. It was first mentioned in 1718 (although the official state Directory of Cultural Monuments says that it dates from 1799). Parts of the milling works are still preserved. In the early 20th century, the miller’s family, numbering 14 members, was housed in the little mill building next to the workrooms.
- Saint Anthony’s Catholic Church (branch church), Hauptstraße 19, aisleless church from 1787, lengthened in 1846, additions to the side and the tower after 1945
- Alte Poststraße 4 – Quereinhaus (a combination residential and commercial house divided for these two purposes down the middle, perpendicularly to the street), apparently from 1870
- (Opposite) Brunnenstraße 2 a, well house, possibly from the 19th century
- Brunnenstraße 5 a – former school with half-hipped gables, partly covered in slates, apparently from 1843
- Brunnenstraße 12 – Quereinhaus from 1818, cobbled yard
- Brunnenstraße/corner of Alte Poststraße – well house, possibly from the 19th century
- Hauptstraße – sandstone wayside cross from 1810

=== Natural monuments ===
Among these are the juniper heath and the Drei Eichen (“Three Oaks”) natural monument.
