= Meerfelder Maar =

Volcanic lake in Eifel, Germany

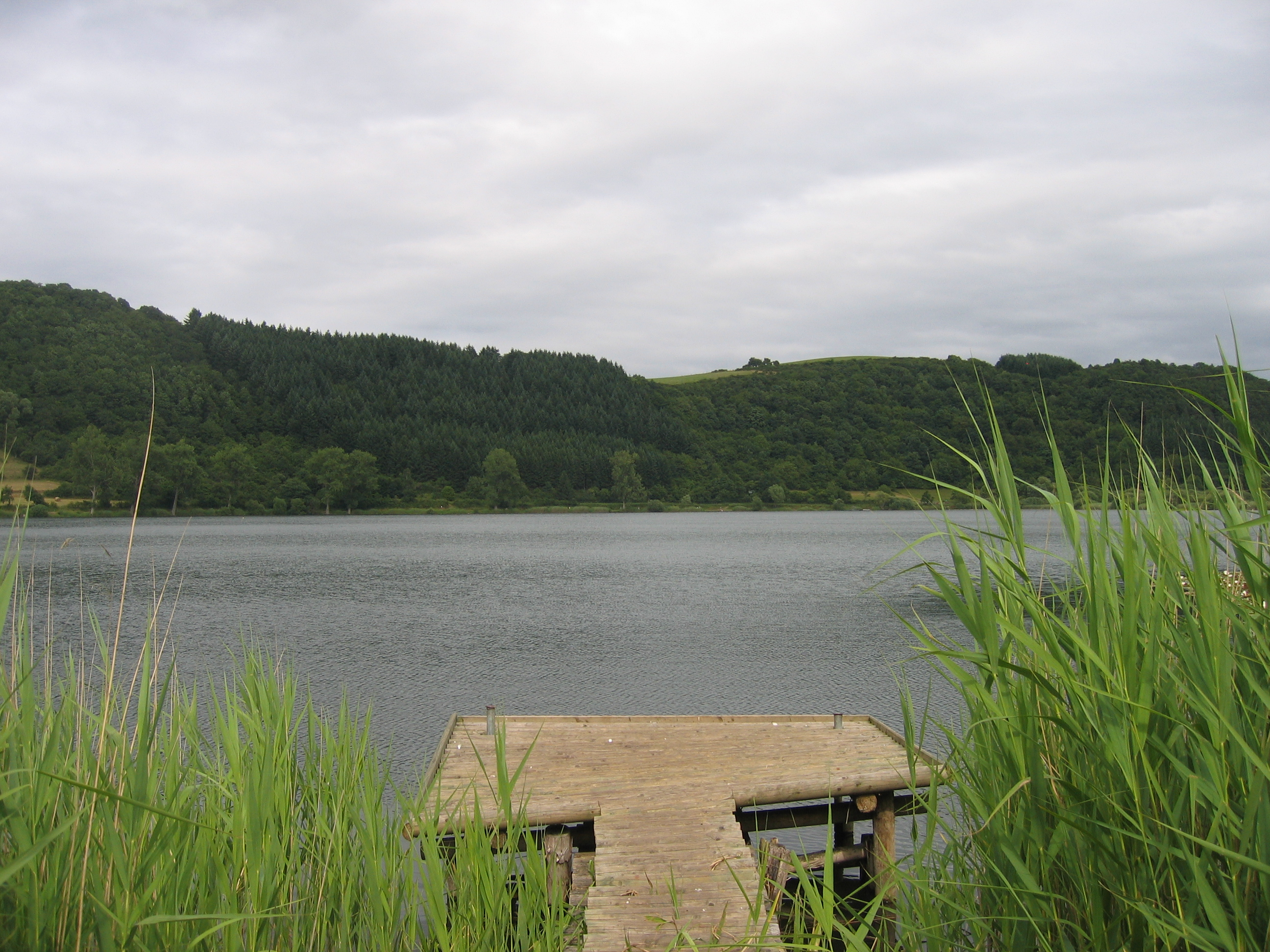
View of the east shore

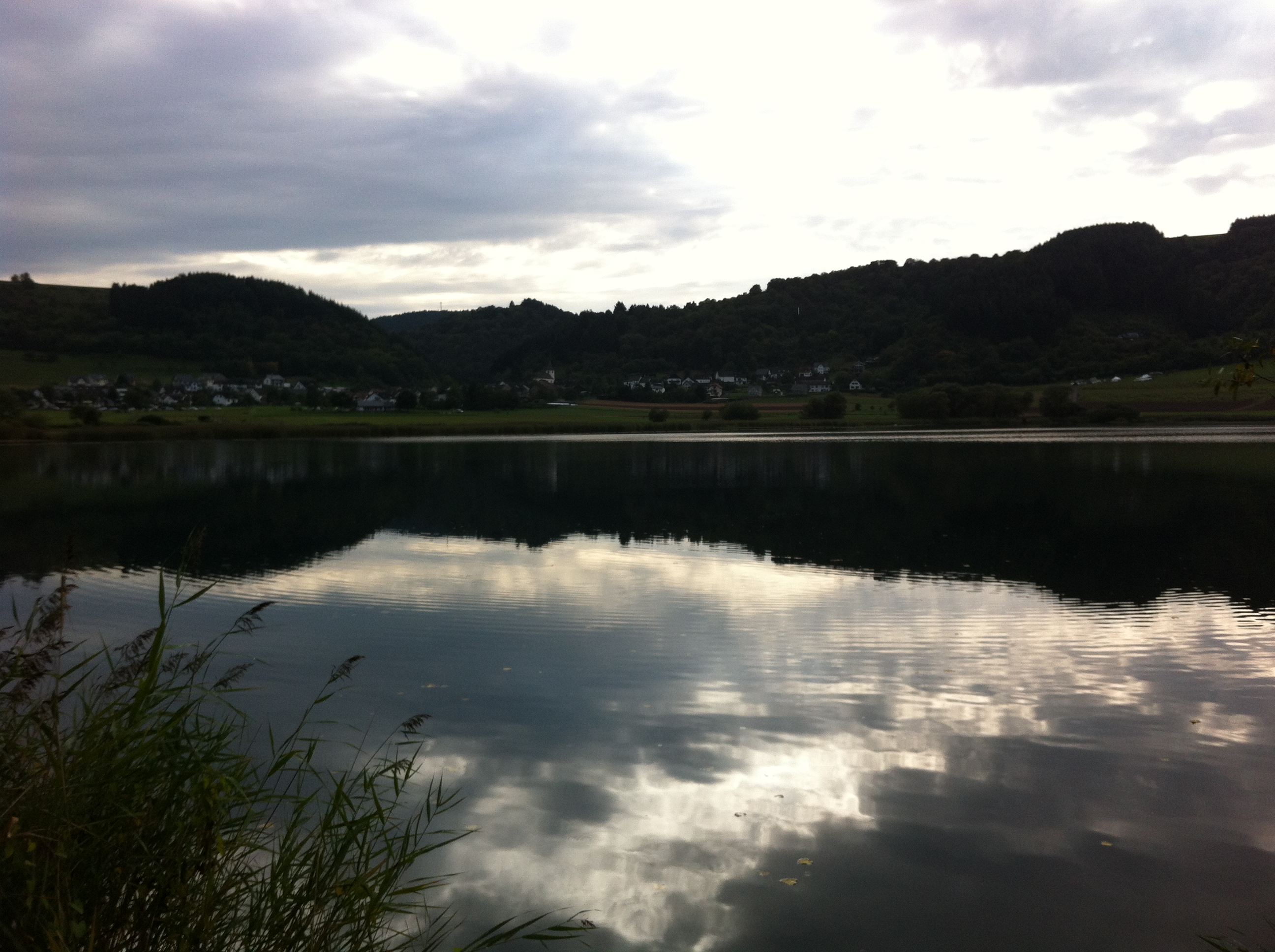
View of the west shore

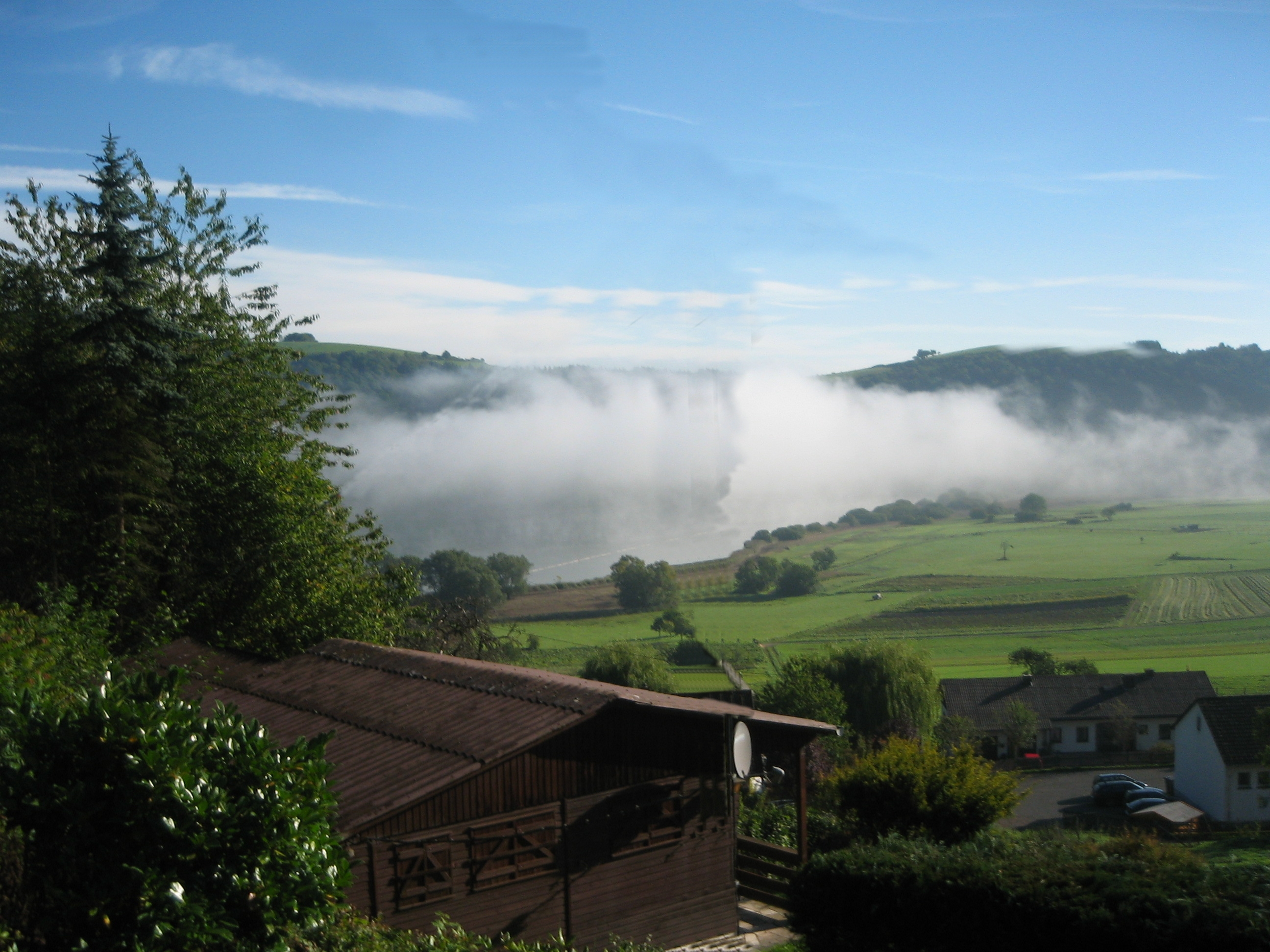
In the fog

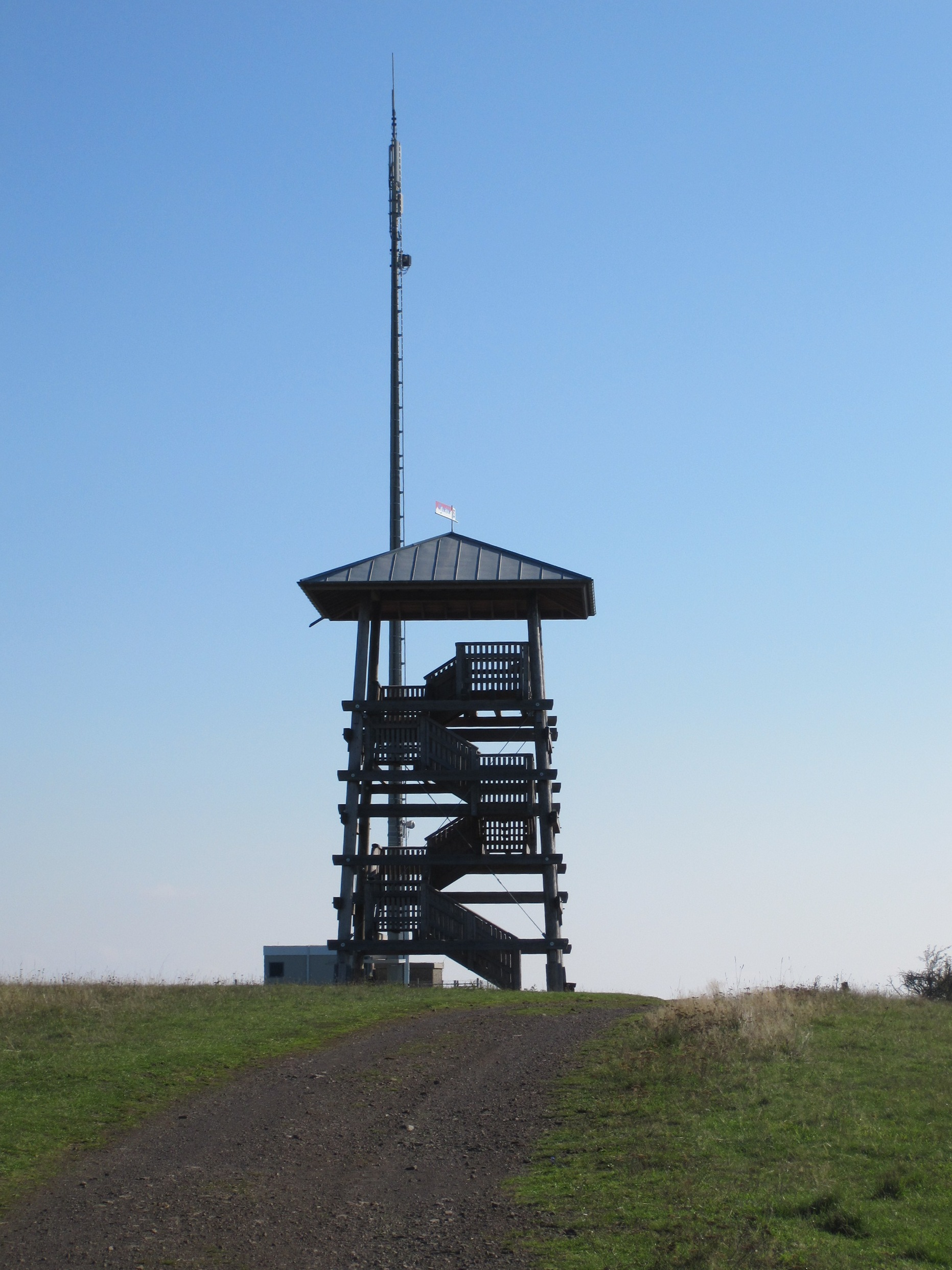
"Landesblick" observation tower

The Meerfelder Maar is a maar by the village of Meerfeld not far from the town of Manderscheid in the Eifel in the German state of Rhineland-Palatinate.

== Formation ==
The maar is at least 30,000 years old and, according to the more recent information, is probably even 40,000 years old. In 1978 the lake deposits were investigated in order to determine its exact age. Numerous borings have been carried out in the Meerfelder Maar right up to the present day.

It was formed by a huge underground phreatomagmatic explosion that happened when hot magma rose and struck a water-laden layer of rock. The explosive evaporation of the water crushed the surrounding rock and threw some of it upwards. The resulting hollow filled up again with rock and a funnel-shaped sink-hole formed at the surface. The magma chamber, from which the magma rose, lies about 2,000 to 6,000 metres below the Meerfelder Maar.

== Structure ==
The whole crater has a diameter of 1,400 metres from east to west and 1,200 metres from north to south, and is about 125 hectares in area. It is thus one of the larger maars in the Eifel. The highest part of the crater rim lies at a height of 515 m above NHN, where there is an observation tower, the Landesblick ("countryside view"). Half of the maar basin is filled today by the maar lake. The village of Meerfeld lies at the southern edge of the basin, still within the hollow created by the eruption.

== Maar lake ==
Over the course of time the maar has filled with water and formed the present day maar lake which has a maximum depth of 17 metres. It is 780 metres long (west to east) and 490 metres wide (north to south). The surface of the lake is 336.6 m above sea level (NHN).

From 1877 to 1880 the water level of the lake was artificially lowered in order to create meadows and pasture land. The cost of 12,000 gold marks was paid by the state and the province, which is why the municipality Meerfeld erected a commemorative monument in 1890.

Since the early 20th century the maar lake has suffered from overfertilization of the area and become polytrophic. Until 1984 the water was very dark during the summer months and had a yellow and brown colouration that was due to blue algae. In 1982 the Meerfelder Maar was therefore cleaned by deep draining (Tiefenentwässerung).

The lake itself is increasingly silting up. This is reflected in its vegetation. In the shore regions there are large areas where water-loving plants such as bulrushes, reeds, club rushes, water lilies, water hemlock and yellow irises are growing. There are about 15 species of fish. A fishing licence may be obtained in any of the restaurants in the municipality.

Since 1986 the maar and its wet-dry shoreline areas as well as the deciduous forest in the area of the maar basin have been declared a nature reserve.

== See also ==
- List of lakes in Germany

== Literature ==
- Martina Stebich: Palynologische Untersuchungen zur Vegetationsgeschichte des Weichsel-Spätglazial und Frühholozän an jährlich geschichteten Sedimenten des Meerfelder Maares (Eifel). Dissertationes Botanicae 320, Stuttgart 1999, ISBN 3-443-64232-2.
- Werner P. D´hein: Vulkanland Eifel. Natur- und Kulturführer, mit 26 Stationen der "Deutschen Vulkanstraße". Gaasterland-Verlag, Düsseldorf, 2006, ISBN 3-935873-15-8, ISBN 978-3-935873-15-4.
- Negendank, J.F.W. et al.: The Meerfelder Maar Lake Deposits. Zeitschrift für Gletscherkunde und Glazialgeologie, 21, 67-70, 1985. (pdf 600 kB)
