= Neichen =

- Municipality
- Coat of arms

- Location of Neichen within Vulkaneifel district
- Interactive map of Neichen
- Location within Germany Location within Rhineland-Palatinate
- Coordinates: 50°15′41″N 6°52′14″E
- Country: Germany
- State: Rhineland-Palatinate
- District: Vulkaneifel
- Municipal assoc.: Kelberg

Government
  - Mayor (2019–24): Peter Annen

Area
  - Total: 2.95 km^{2} (1.14 sq mi)
- Elevation: 480 m (1,570 ft)

Population (2025-12-31)
  - Total: 137
  - Density: 46.4/km^{2} (120/sq mi)
- Time zone: UTC+01:00 (CET)
  - Summer (DST): UTC+02:00 (CEST)
- Postal codes: 54552
- Dialling codes: 02692
- Vehicle registration: DAU
- Website: www.neichen-eifel.de

Neichen is an Ortsgemeinde – a municipality belonging to a Verbandsgemeinde, a kind of collective municipality – in the Vulkaneifel district in Rhineland-Palatinate, Germany. It belongs to the Verbandsgemeinde of Kelberg, whose seat is in the like-named municipality.

== Geography ==
The municipality lies in the Vulkaneifel, a part of the Eifel known for its volcanic history, geographical and geological features, and even ongoing activity today, including gases that sometimes well up from the earth.

Roughly 150 people live in Neichen.

== History ==
The name “Neichen” derives from a 14th-century description of the place as the hof von den Eichen (“Estate of the Oaks”), from which arose the shorter form Neichen through faulty separation of the last two words.

Until 1970, the municipality belonged to the Verbandsgemeinde of Daun, when it, along with Beinhausen, Boxberg, Brück, Hörschhausen and Katzwinkel, was annexed to the Verbandsgemeinde of Kelberg.

== Politics ==
=== Municipal council ===
The council is made up of 6 council members, who were elected by majority vote at the municipal election held on 7 June 2009, and the honorary mayor as chairman.

=== Mayor ===
Neichen's mayor is Peter Annen.

=== Coat of arms ===
The German blazon reads: In Gold ein grüner Schrägrechtsbalken, belegt mit goldenem Eichenblatt und gold-silbernen Früchten, begleitet oben und unten von je einem grünen Eichenblatt mit grün-silbernen Früchten.

The municipality's arms might in English heraldic language be described thus: Or a bend vert charged with an oakleaf of the field fructed of two argent and between two oakleaves bendwise of the second likewise fructed.

The oakleaves are canting for the municipality's name which, as mentioned above, derives from the German word Eichen (“oaks”) prefixed with a faultily separated dative plural definite article ending.

== Culture and sightseeing ==
In the village centre stands the small Catholic chapel from 1827 which is consecrated to Saint Brigid, patron saint not only of Ireland but also of, among other things, cattle. This once led to a yearly custom in which farmers would fetch water consecrated to Saint Brigid – Brigittenwasser – in little bottles from the church and take it home to put in sick livestock's fodder as needed. This was supposed to help the animals. This custom, however, is no longer practised.

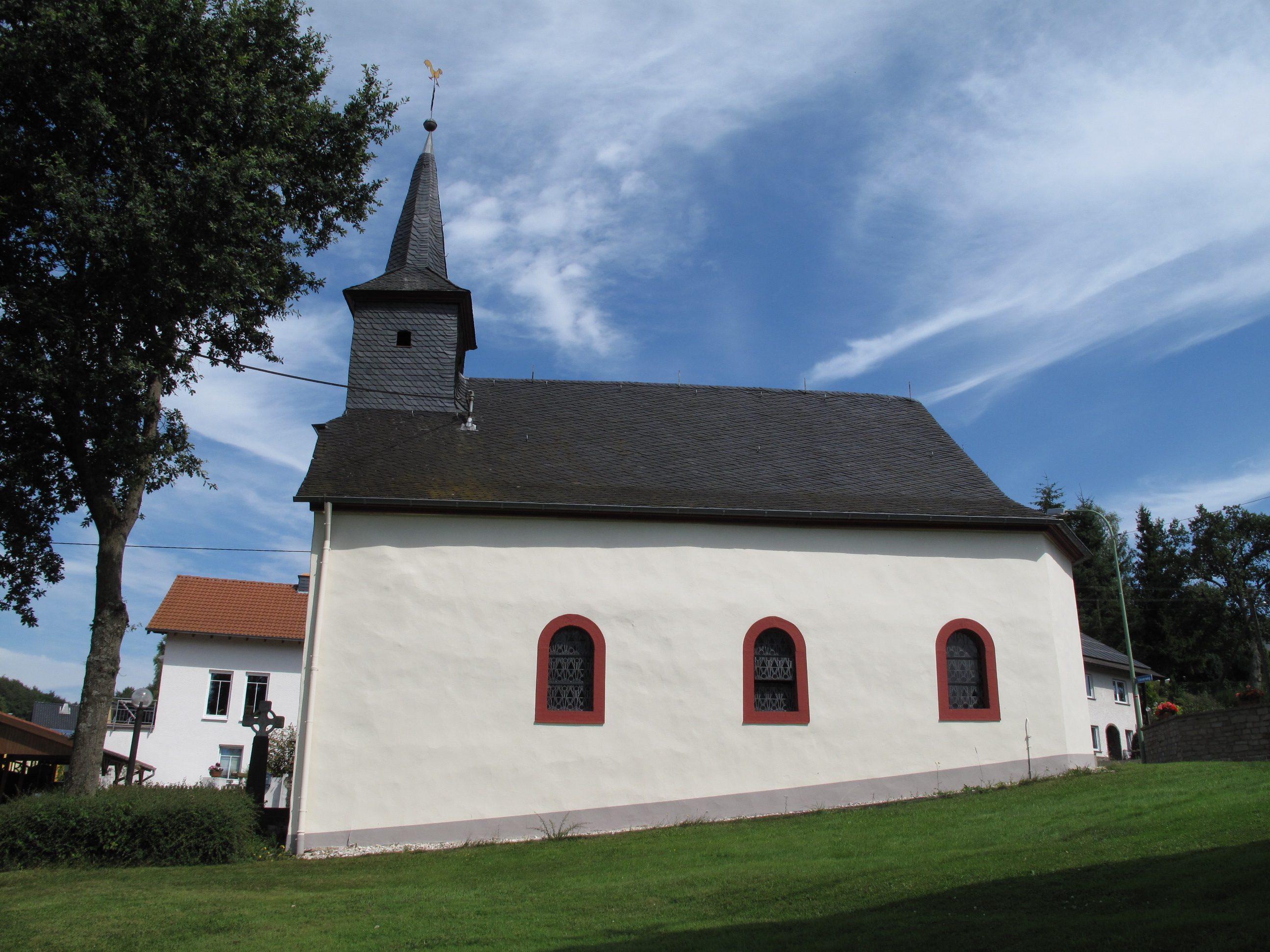
Neichen, chapel

=== Buildings ===
- Catholic branch church, Kapellenstraße, triaxial aisleless church from 1826 (or 1827 according to the above source).
- Hauptstraße 10 – timber-frame house of a corner estate, mid 19th century.
- Hauptstraße/corner of Im Backesgarten – wayside cross, beam cross from 1687.
- Saint Hubert’s Catholic Parish Church (Pfarrkirche St. Hubertus), Hauptstraße, so-called Hilgerath Church (Kirche Hilgerath), mediaeval west tower, aisleless church 1803, expanded in 1950; grave crosses in the outer wall, 17th and 18th centuries.
- Wayside chapel, south of Saint Hubert's Catholic Parish Church, Gothic Revival brick building from 1907, Gothic Revival altar.

=== Natural monuments ===
The Drees, a mineral spring, located in the village's outskirts. The water is sour and contains iron and carbonic acid. The spring is a product of the now mostly extinct volcanic activity that gives the Vulkaneifel its name. The springwater is an acquired taste, but its fanciers swear by their daily glass of Drees even today.

== Economy and infrastructure ==
Since there is only one business in the village, a honey wholesaler's, most people work in the bigger places in the surrounding area, like Daun or Mayen.
