= Meerfeld =

- Municipality
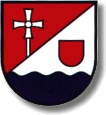
- Coat of arms

- Location of Meerfeld within Bernkastel-Wittlich district
- Interactive map of Meerfeld
- Location within Germany Location within Rhineland-Palatinate
- Coordinates: 50°5′39″N 6°45′20″E
- Country: Germany
- State: Rhineland-Palatinate
- District: Bernkastel-Wittlich
- Municipal assoc.: Wittlich-Land

Government
  - Mayor (2019–24): Eugen Weiler

Area
  - Total: 13.22 km^{2} (5.10 sq mi)
- Elevation: 350–500 m (1,150–1,640 ft)

Population (2025-12-31)
  - Total: 353
  - Density: 26.7/km^{2} (69.2/sq mi)
- Time zone: UTC+01:00 (CET)
  - Summer (DST): UTC+02:00 (CEST)
- Postal codes: 54531
- Dialling codes: 06572
- Vehicle registration: WIL
- Website: www.meerfeld.org

Meerfeld is a village and municipality belonging to a collective municipality in the county of Bernkastel-Wittlich in Rhineland-Palatinate, Germany.

== Geography ==
The municipality lies in the middle of a volcanic crater, part of which is filled with water and known as the Meerfelder Maar. The municipal area is 64.5% wooded. Meerfeld belongs to the collective municipality (Verbandsgemeinde) of Wittlich-Land.

== History ==
Meerfeld is first recorded in 1152 as part of the parish of Bettenfeld. The landholders were for centuries the lords of Malberg. In 1794, Meerfeld came under French rule. In 1814, it was assigned to the Kingdom of Prussia at the Congress of Vienna. Since 1946, it has been part of the then newly founded state of Rhineland-Palatinate.

== Politics ==
=== Municipal council ===
The council is made up of 8 council members and the honorary mayor as chairman. Elections are held every 5 years. On 25 May 2014, the 8 members were elected by majority vote and they unanimously chose Eugen Weiler as their local mayor (Ortsbürgermeister).

=== Coat of arms ===
The German blazon reads: Über blauen, durch Wellenschnitt geteilten Schildfuß schräglinks geteilt, rechts in Rot ein aufsteigendes silbernes Vortragskreuz, links in Silber ein rotes Schildchen, which is a description of the Meerfeld Coat of arms.

The municipality's arms might in English heraldic language be described thus: Over a base wavy azure, party per bend sinister gules issuant palewise from the line of partition John the Baptist's cross argent and argent an inescutcheon of the second.

The maar gave the municipality the first syllable in its name, Meer—, from an Old High German word meaning "bog" or "moor". The wavy base stands for this body of water. Until 1800, the village belonged, within the Duchy of Luxembourg, to the Lords of Malberg whose heraldic bearing was the red shield on a silver field. The church's and the village's longtime patron saint is John the Baptist, who is represented by the cross, his attribute. The tinctures gules, argent and azure (red, silver and blue) also recall the old Luxembourg landholders, as these were the ones that they bore.

== Economy and infrastructure ==
The state-recognized recreational resort (Erholungsort) logged over 30,000 overnight stays in 2003.

== Gallery ==
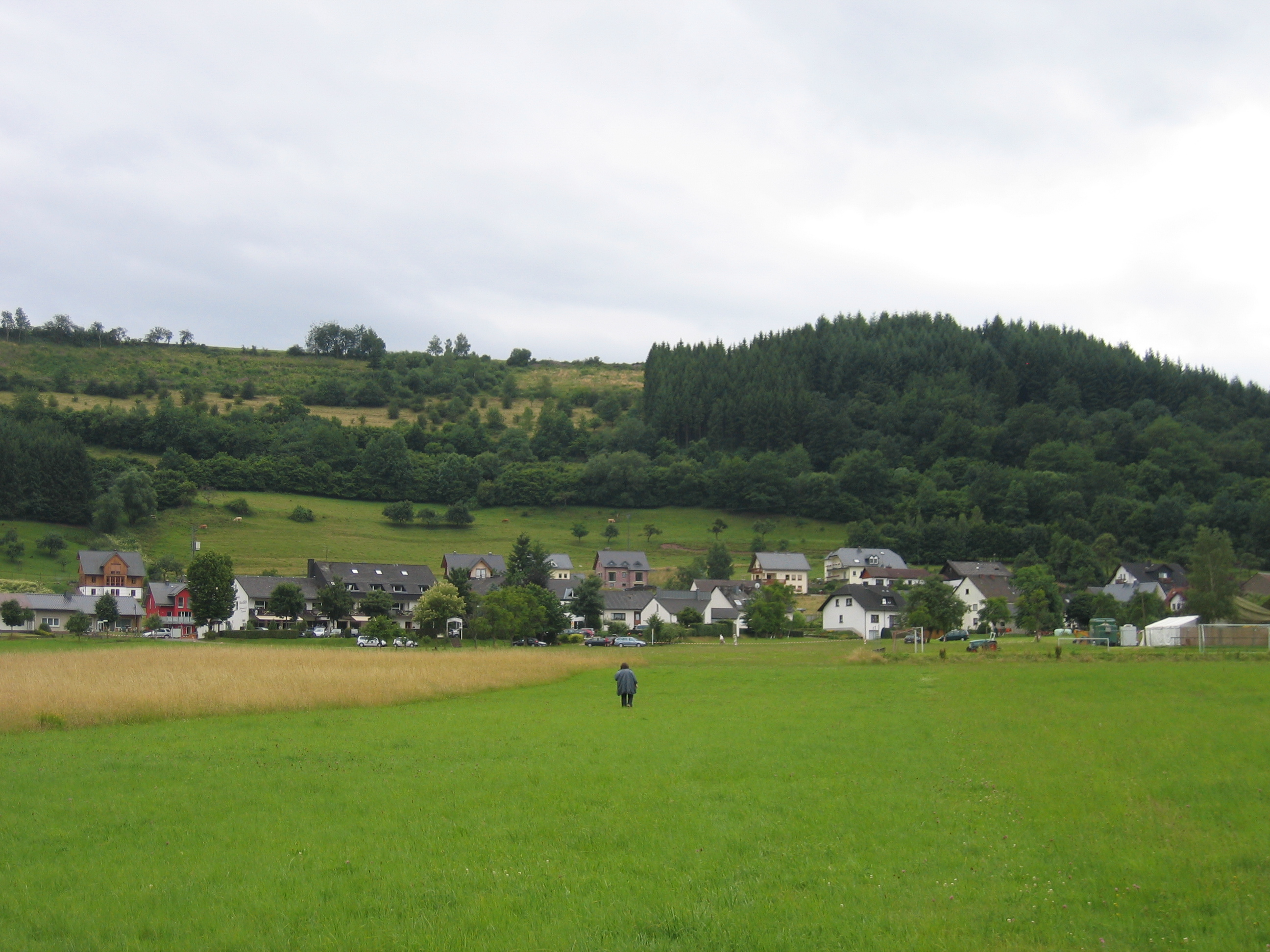
View of Meerfeld from the side of the maar

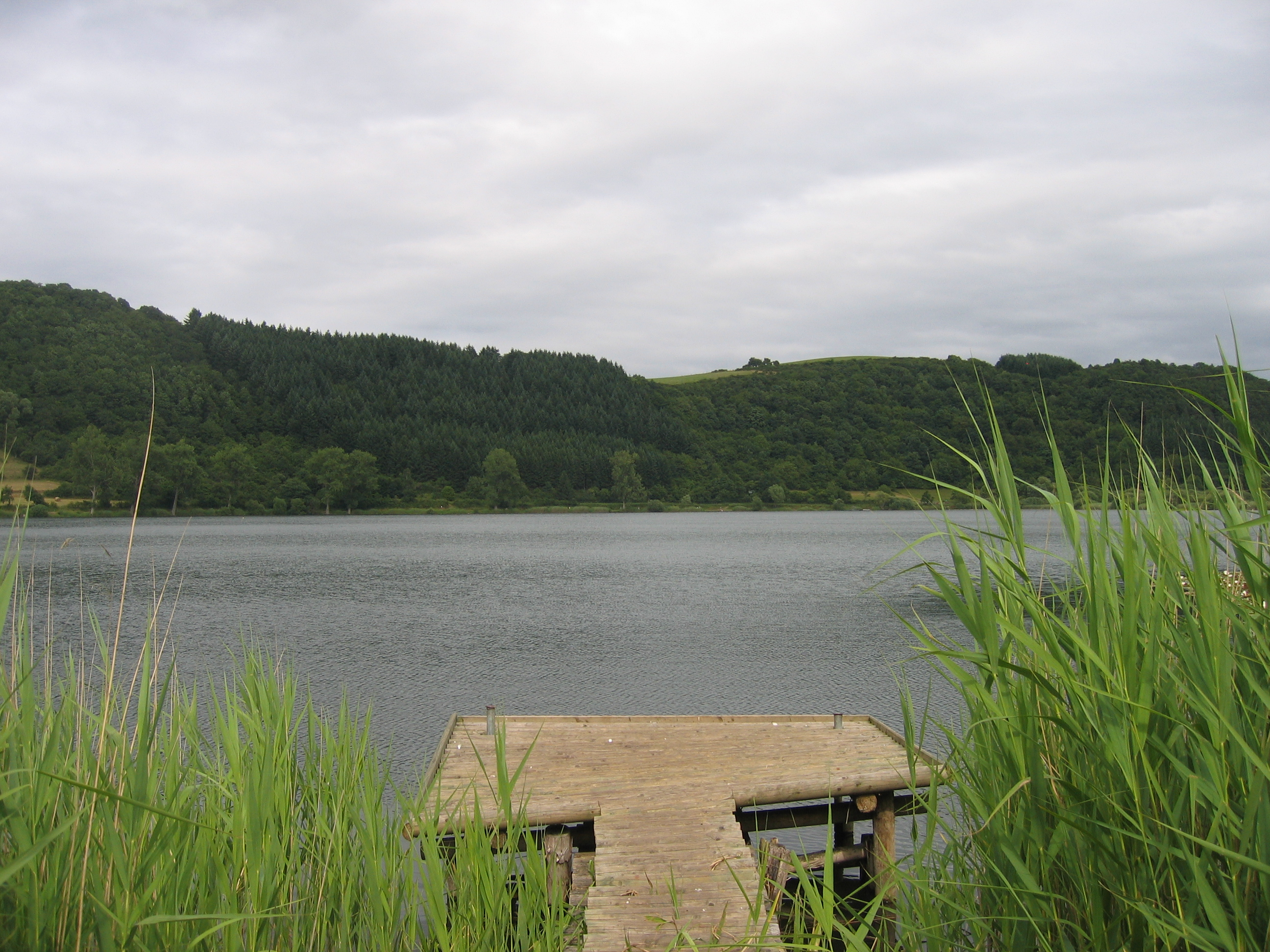
Meerfelder Maar

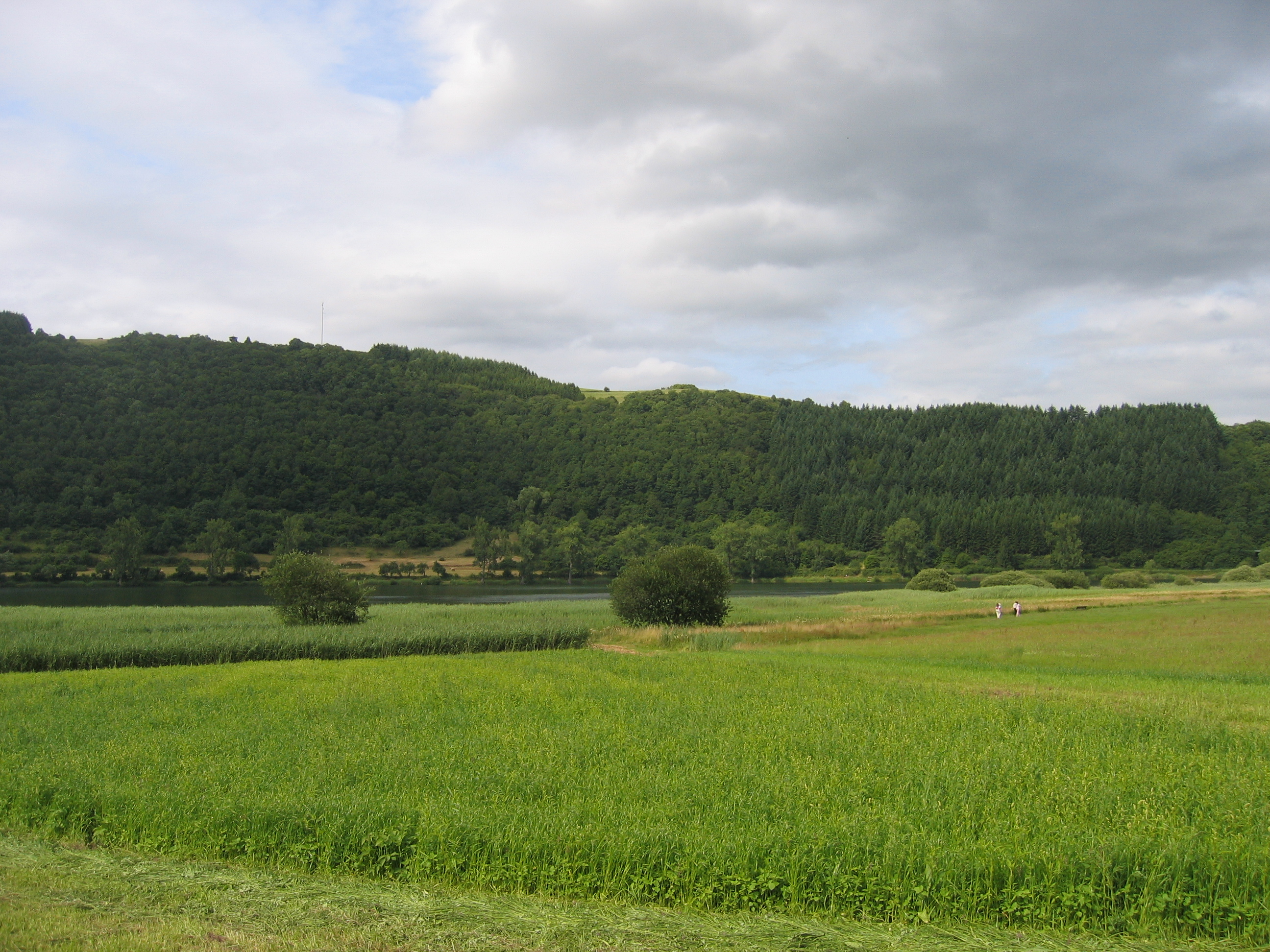
View of the maar from the village

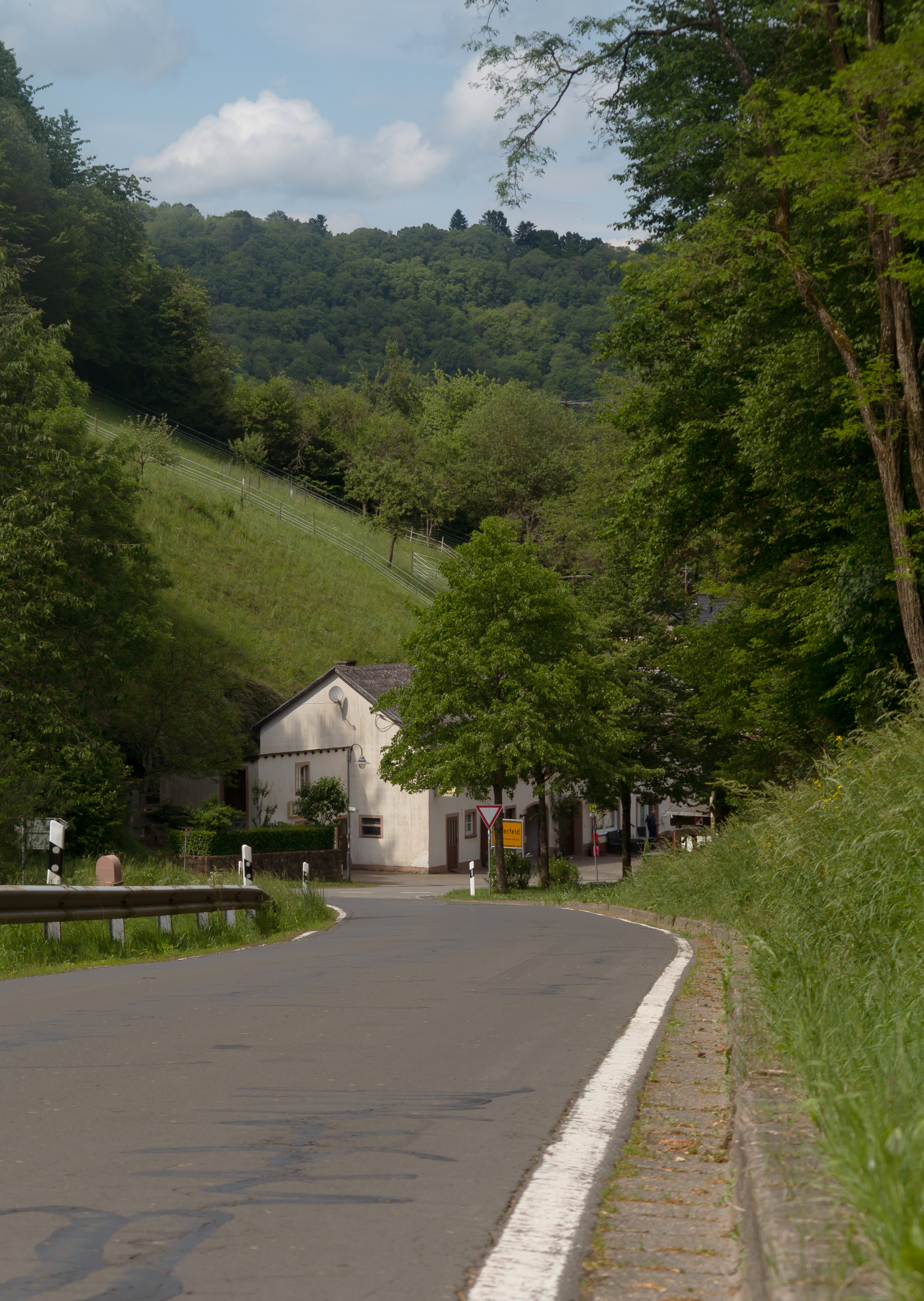
Entrance to the village from Bettenfeld
