= Bettenfeld =

- Municipality
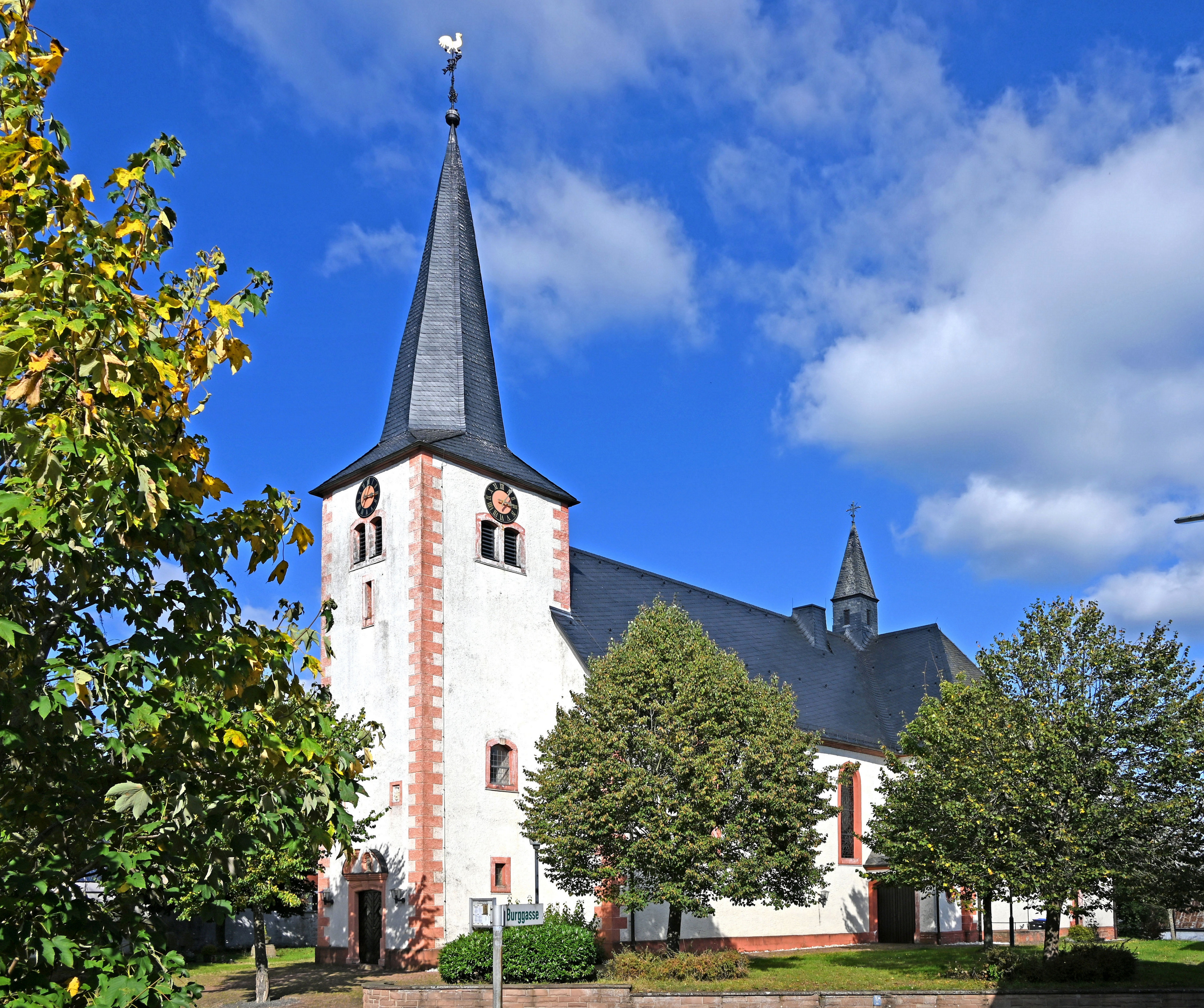

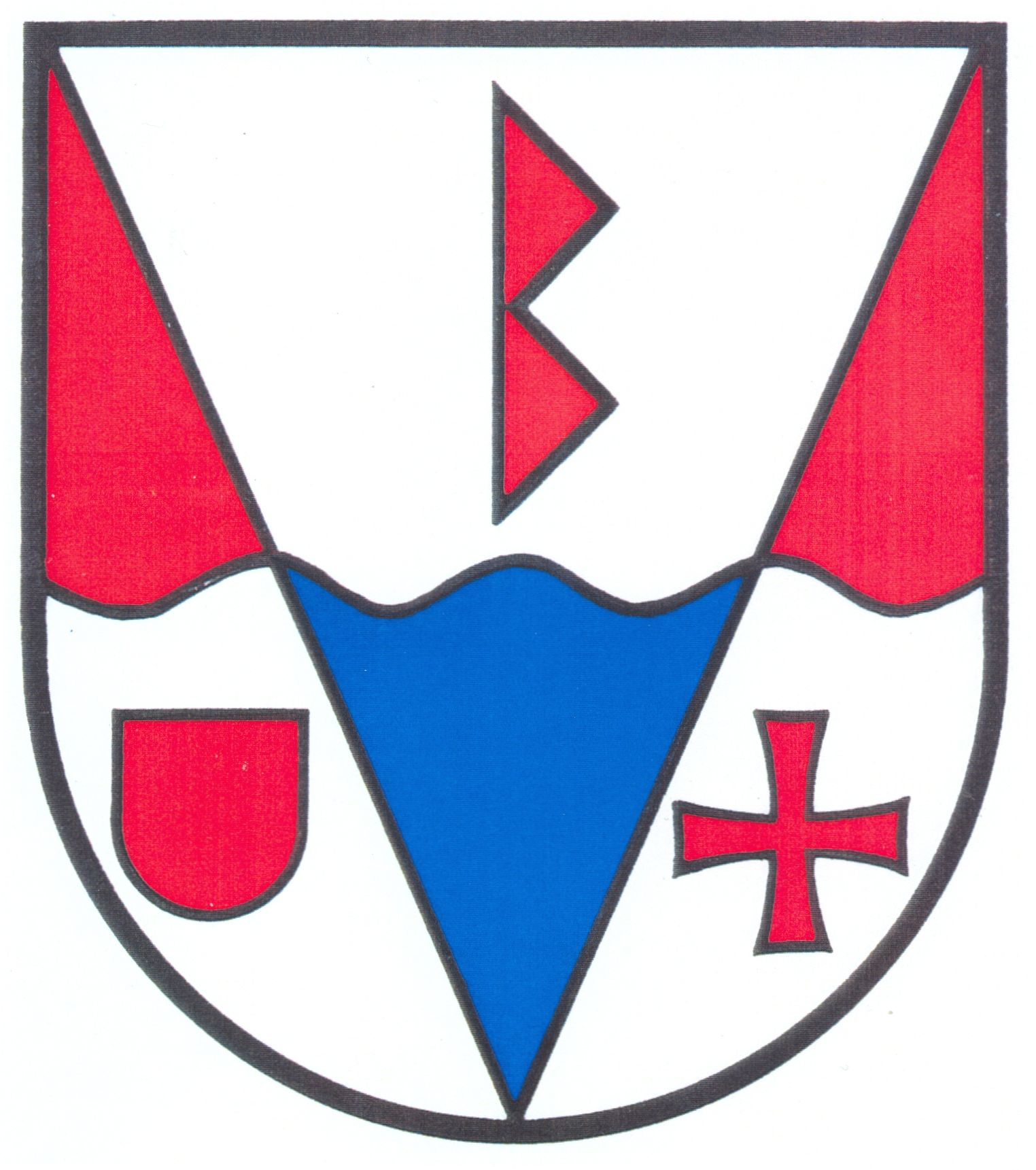
- Coat of arms

- Location of Bettenfeld within Bernkastel-Wittlich district
- Interactive map of Bettenfeld
- Location within Germany Location within Rhineland-Palatinate
- Coordinates: 50°5′7.27″N 6°45′35.37″E
- Country: Germany
- State: Rhineland-Palatinate
- District: Bernkastel-Wittlich
- Municipal assoc.: Wittlich-Land

Government
  - Mayor (2019–24): Heinz Tutt

Area
  - Total: 17.27 km^{2} (6.67 sq mi)
- Elevation: 465 m (1,526 ft)

Population (2025-12-31)
  - Total: 664
  - Density: 38.4/km^{2} (99.6/sq mi)
- Time zone: UTC+01:00 (CET)
  - Summer (DST): UTC+02:00 (CEST)
- Postal codes: 54533
- Dialling codes: 06572
- Vehicle registration: WIL
- Website: www.bettenfeld.de

Bettenfeld is an Ortsgemeinde – a municipality belonging to a Verbandsgemeinde, a kind of collective municipality – in the Bernkastel-Wittlich district in Rhineland-Palatinate, Germany.

== Geography ==
The village lies in the southern Vulkaneifel at elevations of between 460 and 480 m above sea level and is framed by two particularly high peaks: To the southwest lie the wooded lands of the 544 m-high Holzbeul, while rising on the east side of Bettenfeld's municipal area is the Mosenberg, a former volcano, with the Windsborn Crater Lake. This 519 m-high mountain is made up of four craters, the most impressive among which is the water-filled Windsborn, a crater lake whose rim is fully preserved; it is the only mountain crater lake north of the Alps. The Mosenberg's extraordinary appearance was already being appreciated in the 19th century by travellers, artists and scientists, among them the painter Fritz von Wille and the naturalist Alexander von Humboldt.

Bettenfeld belongs to the Verbandsgemeinde Wittlich-Land.

== Politics ==
The municipal council is made up of 12 council members, who were elected by proportional representation at the municipal election held on 7 June 2009, and the honorary mayor as chairman.

The municipal election held on 7 June 2009 yielded the following results:

Year	WG Meuers	WG Zens	WG Leitges	Total
2009	6	4	2	12 seats

== Economy and infrastructure ==
Bettenfeld is a state recognized tourism community. To the east runs the Autobahn A 1, and to the south runs the A 60.

== Famous people ==
- Hans-Josef Bracht (1955– ), politician
