= Schutz, Germany =

Schutz
- Municipality
- Coat of arms

- Location of Schutz within Vulkaneifel district
- Interactive map of Schutz
- Location within Germany Location within Rhineland-Palatinate
- Coordinates: 50°07′44″N 06°45′34″E
- Country: Germany
- State: Rhineland-Palatinate
- District: Vulkaneifel
- Municipal assoc.: Daun

Government
  - Mayor (2019–24): Thomas Oertlin

Area
  - Total: 9.04 km^{2} (3.49 sq mi)
- Elevation: 370 m (1,210 ft)

Population (2025-12-31)
  - Total: 132
  - Density: 14.6/km^{2} (37.8/sq mi)
- Time zone: UTC+01:00 (CET)
  - Summer (DST): UTC+02:00 (CEST)
- Postal codes: 54570
- Dialling codes: 06599
- Vehicle registration: DAU
- Website: www.schutz-vulkaneifel.de

Schutz is an Ortsgemeinde – a municipality belonging to a Verbandsgemeinde, a kind of collective municipality – in the Vulkaneifel district in Rhineland-Palatinate, Germany. It belongs to the Verbandsgemeinde of Daun, whose seat is in the like-named town.

== Geography ==
=== Location ===
The municipality lies in the Vulkaneifel, a part of the Eifel known for its volcanic history, geographical and geological features, and even ongoing activity today, including gases that sometimes well up from the earth.

Schutz lies on the Burberg. The elevation is 528.5 m above sea level.

=== Neighbouring municipalities ===
Schutz’s neighbours are Wallenborn (5 km), Weidenbach (3.5 km), Bleckhausen (1.3 km) and Deudesfeld (3.5 km).

== History ==
In 1238, Schutz had its first documentary mention. Dietrich von Hanster (or Hanxler) was enfeoffed by Heinrich, Lord of Manderscheid and Kerpen with a castle at Manderscheid, a house in the dale and the estate and the mill “zu Schutze” (“at Schutz”).

In 1570, the chapel, consecrated to Saint Wendelin, was mentioned.

In 1723, there was a dispute among Schutz, Manderscheid, Bleckhausen and Niederstadtfeld over how the woodlands of Idler and Ruckbein should be divided. It led to a court case. In 1794, the village had 94 inhabitants. In 1803, Schutz became a branch of the Parish of Bleckhausen.

In 1814, Schutz was grouped into the Bürgermeisterei (“Mayoralty”) of Weidenbach in the Daun district in the Regierungsbezirk of Trier. In 1845, a new chapel was built. In 1854, Schutz had 18 houses with 114 inhabitants. The municipality had 547 Morgen (340 ha) of wooded land, 417 Morgen (106 ha) of scrub and wild land and 4 Morgen (1 ha) of other lands.

To prevent famine, in 1915, the miller had to grind 82% of the grain. Bread was made from rye meal and potatoes. On 1 February, all cereal and meal stocks were seized, as were all the oats, for the army administration. Beginning at this time, everybody received a bread ticket entitling them to 200 g or half a Pfund (250 g) of bread each day. On 1 April everybody got a flour ticket. There was a bumper potato harvest. The winter was marked by petroleum shortages. Many people burnt candles and others obtained carbide lamps.

On 1 December 1916, according to a census, Schutz had 147 inhabitants. In 1918, Schutz was stricken twice by floods within a short time, once in January and again in May. By the time the First World War ended, 7 men from Schutz had fallen.

On 21 April 1923, electric light came to the village for the first time. On 9 November, a new bell was dedicated. In 1925, work began on the watermain.

In 1931, lasting rainy weather destroyed 75% of the harvest. In 1939, the bathing beach was dedicated.

In 1945, after the Second World War was over, once again, 7 men from Schutz had fallen, and 4 were missing.

In 1953, a new bridge on the road to Deudesfeld was built. In 1965, the memorial to the fallen in both World Wars was dedicated. In 1988, the new municipal coat of arms was chosen. A fire station was built in 1995, and work began in 2003 on a community centre, which was dedicated the following year.

== Politics ==
=== Municipal council ===
The council is made up of 6 council members, who were elected by majority vote at the municipal election held on 7 June 2009, and the honorary mayor as chairman.

=== Mayor ===
Schutz’s mayor is Thomas Oertlin.

=== Coat of arms ===
The German blazon reads: Unter rotem Schildhaupt, darin ein goldener Zickzackbalken, in Silber ein grüner Berg, darin ein silbernes Mühlrad.

The municipality’s arms might in English heraldic language be described thus: Argent a mount vert in base charged with a waterwheel of the field, on a chief gules a fess dancetty Or.

The chief showing a gold fess dancetty (horizontal zigzag stripe) on a red field is a rendering of the arms formerly borne by the Counts of Manderscheid, although the tinctures are reversed (this might be to comply with the general rule in heraldry that holds that two colours or two metals must not touch). The village once belonged to this noble family, and then later to the Electoral-Trier Amt of Manderscheid. The green mount in base symbolizes the Burberg, which is the local landscape’s most striking feature. The green tincture stands for the scenic and heavily wooded municipal area. The waterwheel refers to the four mills that once stood in Schutz. The first was mentioned in a document as early as 1238. The Rutschmühle has found its way into local legend.

The arms have been borne since 13 September 1988.

== Images ==
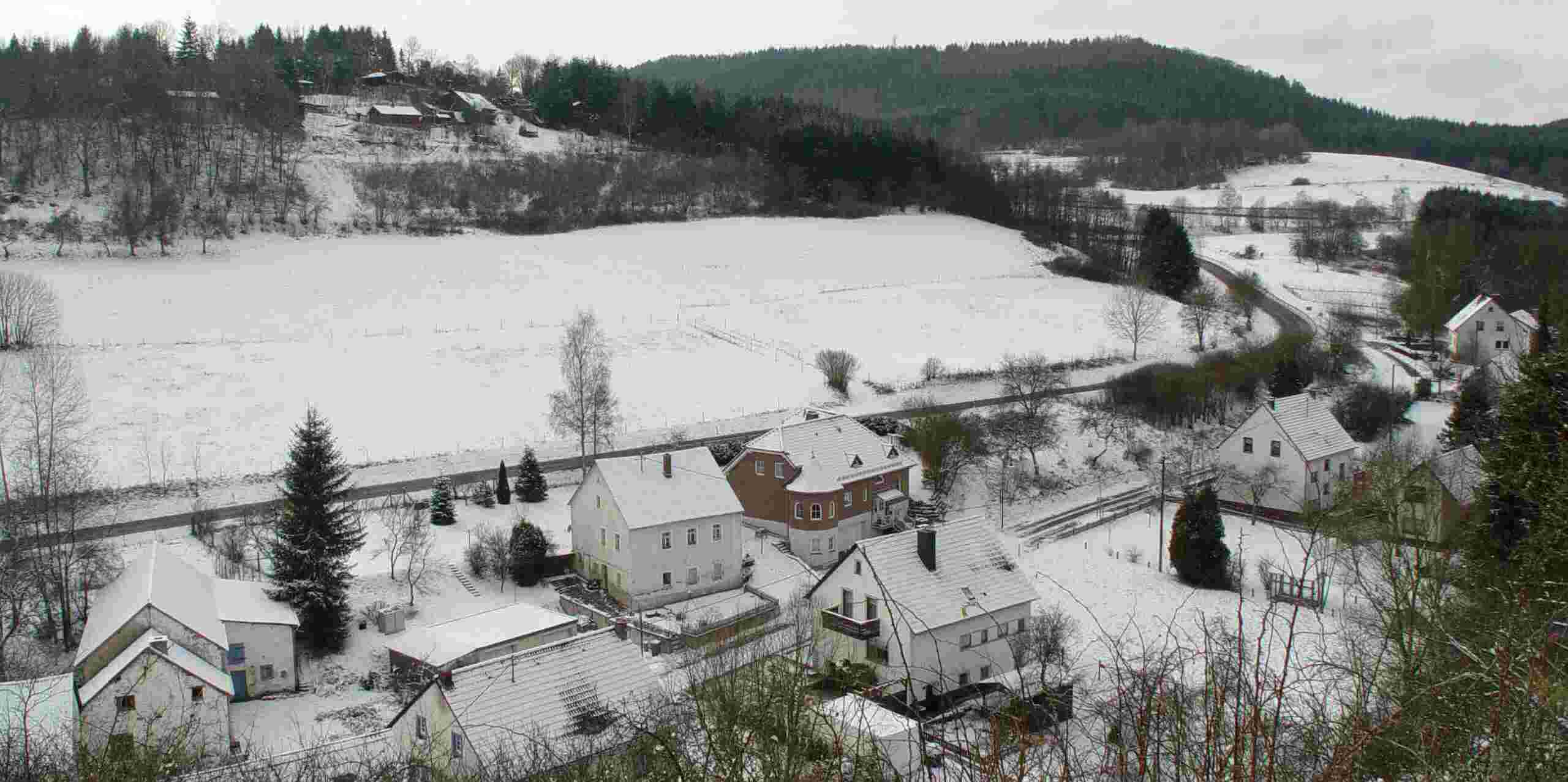
West part of the municipality (winter 2003)

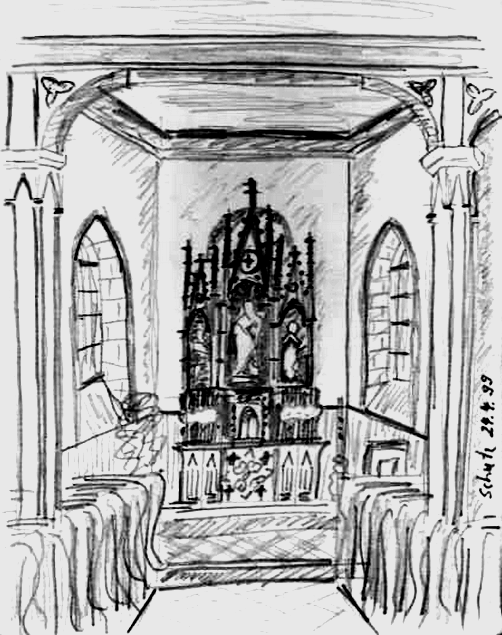
Saint Wendelin’s Chapel, pencil sketch (1999)

== Culture and sightseeing ==
Buildings:

- Saint Barbara’s Catholic Church, Dorfstraße 3 – Gothic Revival aisleless church, late 19th century.
- Burbergweg 2 – Quereinhaus (a combination residential and commercial house divided for these two purposes down the middle, perpendicularly to the street), apparently from 1824.
- Hauptstraße – wayside cross, sandstone shaft cross from 1706.
- Zur Lay 22 – former mill; house, stable-barn.
