= Weidenbach, Vulkaneifel =

Weidenbach
- Municipality
- Coat of arms

- Location of Weidenbach within Vulkaneifel district
- Interactive map of Weidenbach
- Location within Germany Location within Rhineland-Palatinate
- Coordinates: 50°7′43.47″N 6°42′33.85″E
- Country: Germany
- State: Rhineland-Palatinate
- District: Vulkaneifel
- Municipal assoc.: Daun

Government
  - Mayor (2019–24): Bernhard Dartsch

Area
  - Total: 10.76 km^{2} (4.15 sq mi)
- Elevation: 475 m (1,558 ft)

Population (2025-12-31)
  - Total: 244
  - Density: 22.7/km^{2} (58.7/sq mi)
- Time zone: UTC+01:00 (CET)
  - Summer (DST): UTC+02:00 (CEST)
- Postal codes: 54570
- Dialling codes: 06599
- Vehicle registration: DAU

Weidenbach (German pronunciation: [ˈvaɪdn̩bax]) is an Ortsgemeinde – a municipality belonging to a Verbandsgemeinde, a kind of collective municipality – in the Vulkaneifel district in Rhineland-Palatinate, Germany. It belongs to the Verbandsgemeinde of Daun, whose seat is in the like-named town. In Weidenbach, a Moselle Franconian dialect is spoken.

== Geography ==
The municipality lies in the Vulkaneifel, a part of the Eifel known for its volcanic history, geographical and geological features, and even ongoing activity today, including gases that sometimes well up from the earth. Weidenbach lies on the river Salm.

== History ==
On 17 October 1016, Weidenbach had its first documentary mention under the name Witenbuoch in a document from Emperor Heinrich II in which he confirmed to Abbot of Prüm Urold holdings in Weidenbach (Witenbuoch), Stadtfeld (Stadefelt) and Ließem (Liudesheim). The holdings served to support the collegiate church at Prüm that Urold endowed that same year.

Centuries later, the Lords of Pyrmont were enfeoffed with, among other holdings, Weidenbach by Archbishop of Trier Johann II in 1457. In 1460, the Archbishop also took Weidenbach under his protection. In 1565, Count Diedrich I of Manderscheid-Kayl was enfeoffed with Weidenbach.

In 1794, just before the French Revolutionary Wars, Weidenbach belonged to the court district of Ober-Stadtfeld in the Amt of Manderscheid. The lordship was held by the collegiate foundation B. M. V. (beatae Mariae virginis – “the Blessed Virgin Mary’s”, or “of the Blessed Virgin Mary” in Latin), which, however, drew little in the way of income from its holding, and then only on Saint Andrew’s Day (November 30).

When the French overran the Eifel and other lands on the Rhine’s left bank soon afterwards, the inhabitants of Weidenbach were asked to sign a resolution of unity with the French. Of the 147 people who lived in Weidenbach at the time, nineteen refused to sign.

In the time of French administration, the Mairie (“Mayoralty”) of Weidenbach belonged to the Canton of Manderscheid in the Region of Prüm. To this Mairie belonged Bleckhausen, Deudesfeld, Schutz and Weidenbach. Weidenbach was once parochially united with Deudesfeld, but it was granted its own parish in the time of French administration, although it was only a very small parish that did not stretch beyond Weidenbach itself.

== Politics ==
=== Municipal council ===
The council is made up of 6 council members, who were elected by majority vote at the municipal election held on 7 June 2009, and the honorary mayor as chairman.

=== Mayor ===
Weidenbach's mayor is Bernhard Dartsch.

=== Coat of arms ===
The German blazon reads: Unter rotem Schildhaupt, darin ein goldener Zickzackbalken, in Silber ein erniedrigter blauer Wellenbalken, überdeckt von einem Weidenbaum mit schwarzem Stamm und grünen Blättern.

The municipality's arms might in English heraldic language be described thus: Argent a fess abased azure surmounted by a willow eradicated with five branches sable and leaves vert, on a chief gules a fess dancetty Or.

The fess dancetty (horizontal zigzag stripe) in the chief symbolizes Weidenbach's lordly history, which brought it through the Lords of Pyrmont and the Electorate of Trier to Count Dietrich IV of Manderscheid-Schleiden. Recalling the time of the Lordship of Pyrmont and the allegiance to the Electorate of Trier through the Amt of Manderscheid is the fess dancetty in the chief, but with the tinctures reversed. The main field in the arms is canting for the municipality's name, Weidenbach, which in German literally means “Willowbrook”, thus explaining the charges there, a willow and a fess abased azure (blue horizontal wavy stripe set below the centre) representing a brook.

The arms have been borne since 1990.

== Culture and sightseeing ==
Buildings:

- Saint John the Baptist’s Catholic Parish Church (Pfarrkirche St. Johannes der Täufer), Hauptstraße 22 – four-axis aisleless church, 1830; sandstone Crucifixion Bildstock, late 18th century.
- Auf Hostert – Quereinhaus (a combination residential and commercial house divided for these two purposes down the middle, perpendicularly to the street), 19th century.
- At Hauptstraße 18 – Baroque house entrance from 1804.
- Across from Hauptstraße 58 – wayside cross, sandstone shaft cross from 1793.
- In der Hohl 8 – small Quereinhaus, possibly from the earlier half of the 19th century.
