= Neroth =

- Municipality
- Coat of arms

- Location of Neroth within Vulkaneifel district
- Interactive map of Neroth
- Location within Germany Location within Rhineland-Palatinate
- Coordinates: 50°11′46″N 6°44′45″E
- Country: Germany
- State: Rhineland-Palatinate
- District: Vulkaneifel
- Municipal assoc.: Gerolstein

Government
  - Mayor (2019–24): Egon Schommers

Area
  - Total: 7.24 km^{2} (2.80 sq mi)
- Elevation: 470 m (1,540 ft)

Population (2025-12-31)
  - Total: 811
  - Density: 112/km^{2} (290/sq mi)
- Time zone: UTC+01:00 (CET)
  - Summer (DST): UTC+02:00 (CEST)
- Postal codes: 54570
- Dialling codes: 06591
- Vehicle registration: DAU
- Website: www.mausefallendorf.de

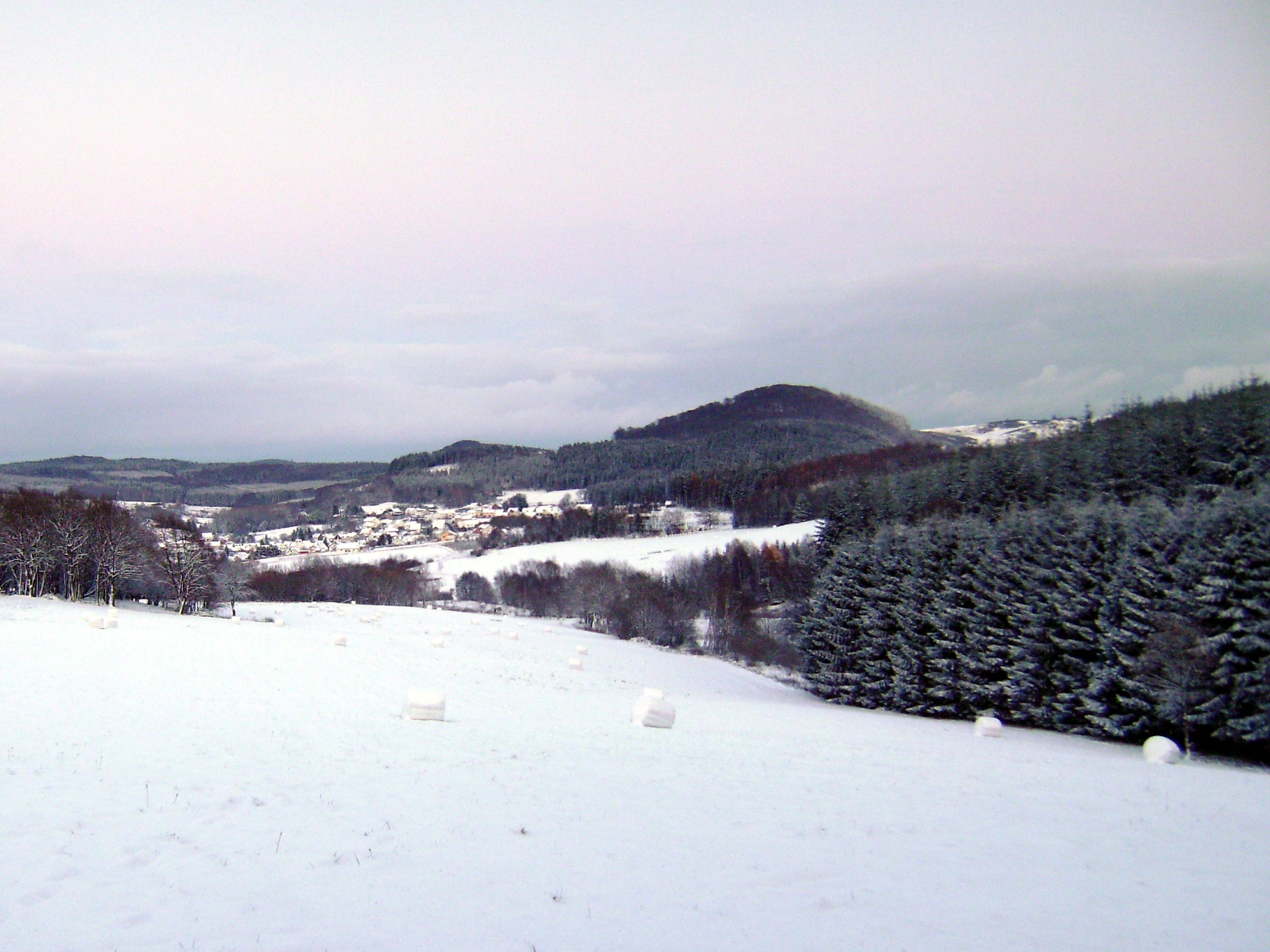
The Nerother Kopf, which rises up above the village (at left centre), on a winter afternoon, seen from the west; the Freudenkoppe ruin is hidden under the beeches.

Neroth is an Ortsgemeinde – a municipality belonging to a Verbandsgemeinde, a kind of collective municipality – in the Vulkaneifel district in Rhineland-Palatinate, Germany. It belongs to the Verbandsgemeinde of Gerolstein, whose seat is in the like-named town.

== Geography ==
The municipality lies in the Vulkaneifel, a part of the Eifel known for its volcanic history, geographical and geological features, and even ongoing activity today, including gases that sometimes well up from the earth.

== History ==
Neroth arose out of several small centres, namely Niederroth, Hundswinkel and Oberroth. The placename ending —roth refers to clearing woods for farming, and goes back to the 12th century or thereabouts.

As early as 1744, church books mentioned, besides the resident people, wandering families – the Jenische people. They were pedlars and took up residence in winter in Neroth. They distinguished themselves from the long established peasant families with their endogamous marriages and their own language, Jenisch.

== Politics ==
=== Municipal council ===
The council is made up of 12 council members, who were elected by proportional representation at the municipal election held on 7 June 2009, and the honorary mayor as chairman.

The municipal election held on 7 June 2009 yielded the following results:

Year	WG Schommers	WG Peters	Total
2009	7	5	12 seats

=== Mayor ===
Neroth's mayor is Egon Schommers.

=== Coat of arms ===
The German blazon reads: Zwischen einem durch Zinnenschnitt von Gold und Rot geteilten Schildhaupt und einem grünen Fünfberg, darin eine silberne Mausefalle, in Gold eine rote Waage.

The municipality's arms might in English heraldic language be described thus: Or balances gules and in chief a fess embattled of seven of the same, in base a mount of five vert charged with a hemispherical wire mousetrap argent.

The fess embattled (horizontal stripe with an upper edge resembling a castle's battlements) symbolizes the castle built by John of Bohemia on the Nerother Kopf (mountain). The red balances stand as a symbol of the old Neroth high court. The mount of five – a five-knolled hill – represents the five prominent peaks that frame the village. The silver mousetrap – the municipality's website shows a drawing of this particular type, among others – stands for the wireworking industry of the 19th century that was an important income earner in the municipality, and for today's unique mousetrap museum.

== Culture and sightseeing ==
On one of the nearby mountains, the Nerother Kopf, is found the Freudenkoppe, a castle ruin, near which is the old millstone quarry where the Nerother Wandervogel youth movement was founded by the brothers Robert and Karl Oelbermann on the night of New Year's Eve 1919 and New Year's Day 1920.

=== Mousetraps ===
In the 19th century, Neroth was no exception among the Eifel’s many villages insofar as it was poverty-stricken. Agriculture was extremely scant. Commercial and artisanal opportunities were hard to come by. Some of the villagers therefore plied sidelines to their usual work, peddling carved spoons or basketware. There was a further, smaller sector of the population made up of non-nomadic Jenische pedlars and tinkers. The stage was thus set for a new handicraft industry to arise, one that produced much sought-after articles: mousetraps and rat traps. The needed skills were brought to the community by a former teacher from Neroth, who saw such an industry as a way out of the otherwise intractable chronic wretchedness that had hitherto beset the village – and indeed most of the Eifel.

Many of the poorer villagers – both Jenische and non-Jenische – then went about peddling handicrafts made of wire, among these, mousetraps. The upshot was that many families’ livelihoods improved markedly. These wire handicrafts were made mostly by women at home, while the men became travelling mousetrap salesmen, going well beyond Germany's current borders to sell their wares, into what is now Poland and the Czech Republic. The pedlars used a secret language amongst themselves, Jenisch. Growing industrialization began to hinder the trade noticeably by the early 20th century, until in 1970, it was brought to an end.

Mousetraps have become so closely identified with Neroth that the municipality has a museum dedicated to mousetraps, and a dome-shaped wire mousetrap is even one of the charges in the municipal arms.

=== Buildings ===
- Saint Wendelin's Catholic Parish Church (Pfarrkirche St. Wendelin), Layenstraße 8 – former aisleless church, 1782, integrated into an addition built crosswise thereto in 1962; shaft cross, apparently from 1804.
- Hauptstraße – warriors’ memorial 1914-1918, soldier from 1932, addition made in 1945.
- Mühlenweg 3 – former school, stately plastered building from 1844.
