= Boxberg, Rhineland-Palatinate =

Boxberg
- Municipality
- Coat of arms

- Location of Boxberg within Vulkaneifel district
- Interactive map of Boxberg
- Location within Germany Location within Rhineland-Palatinate
- Coordinates: 50°16′32″N 6°52′42″E
- Country: Germany
- State: Rhineland-Palatinate
- District: Vulkaneifel
- Municipal assoc.: Kelberg

Government
  - Mayor (2019–24): Harald Fell

Area
  - Total: 5.65 km^{2} (2.18 sq mi)
- Elevation: 560 m (1,840 ft)

Population (2025-12-31)
  - Total: 201
  - Density: 35.6/km^{2} (92.1/sq mi)
- Time zone: UTC+01:00 (CET)
  - Summer (DST): UTC+02:00 (CEST)
- Postal codes: 54552
- Dialling codes: 02692
- Vehicle registration: DAU

Boxberg (German pronunciation: [ˈbɔksˌbɛʁk]) is an Ortsgemeinde – a municipality belonging to a Verbandsgemeinde, a kind of collective municipality – in the Vulkaneifel district in Rhineland-Palatinate, Germany. It belongs to the Verbandsgemeinde of Kelberg, whose seat is in the like-named municipality.

== Geography ==
The municipality lies in the Vulkaneifel, a part of the Eifel known for its volcanic history, geographical and geological features, and even ongoing activity today, including gases that sometimes well up from the earth.

Boxberg is also where the river Lieser rises.

== History ==
In feudal times, the village belonged to the Electoral-Trier Amt of Daun. The Niederehe Monastery owned landholdings at “Bocksberg”, which under French rule were auctioned off. Under Prussian administration, Boxberg was a municipality in the Bürgermeisterei (“Mayoralty”) of Sarmersbach. In the course of administrative restructuring in 1970, Boxberg was assigned to the Verbandsgemeinde of Kelberg.

== Politics ==
=== Municipal council ===
The council is made up of 6 council members, who were elected by majority vote at the municipal election held on 7 June 2009, and the honorary mayor as chairman.

=== Coat of arms ===
The German blazon reads: In Silber ein schrägrechter, blauer Wellenbalken; oben ein rotes Rad, unten ein schräg aufgerichtetes rotes Schwert.

The municipality’s arms might in English heraldic language be described thus: Argent a bend wavy azure between a wheel spoked of six and a sword bendwise, the pommel to base, all gules.

The bend wavy (that is, wavy slanted stripe) is meant to represent the river Lieser, which rises in Boxberg’s municipal area. The wheel has two meanings. Not only does it stand for the agricultural structure that prevailed in Boxberg for centuries, but it is also the local patron saint’s attribute; the local church is consecrated to Saint Catherine, who was to have been martyred on a breaking wheel. The sword also refers to death sentences. It stands for the old Electoral-Trier execution place, then known as “Schundbalg”, believed to have been the hill now called the Schillberg. The customary method of execution, however, did not involve a sword. The condemned were hanged on the gallows that stood there.

== Culture and sightseeing ==
=== Buildings ===
- Saint Catherine’s Catholic Church (branch church), Kirchstraße 12, biaxial aisleless church, essentially mediaeval, altered in 1718
- Kirchstraße 2 – estate along street from 1865

=== Religion ===
The citizens of Boxberg are roughly 90% Roman Catholic and belong to the parish of St. Hubertus Beinhausen with its parish church at Hilgerath.
