= Lieser (river) =

River in Germany

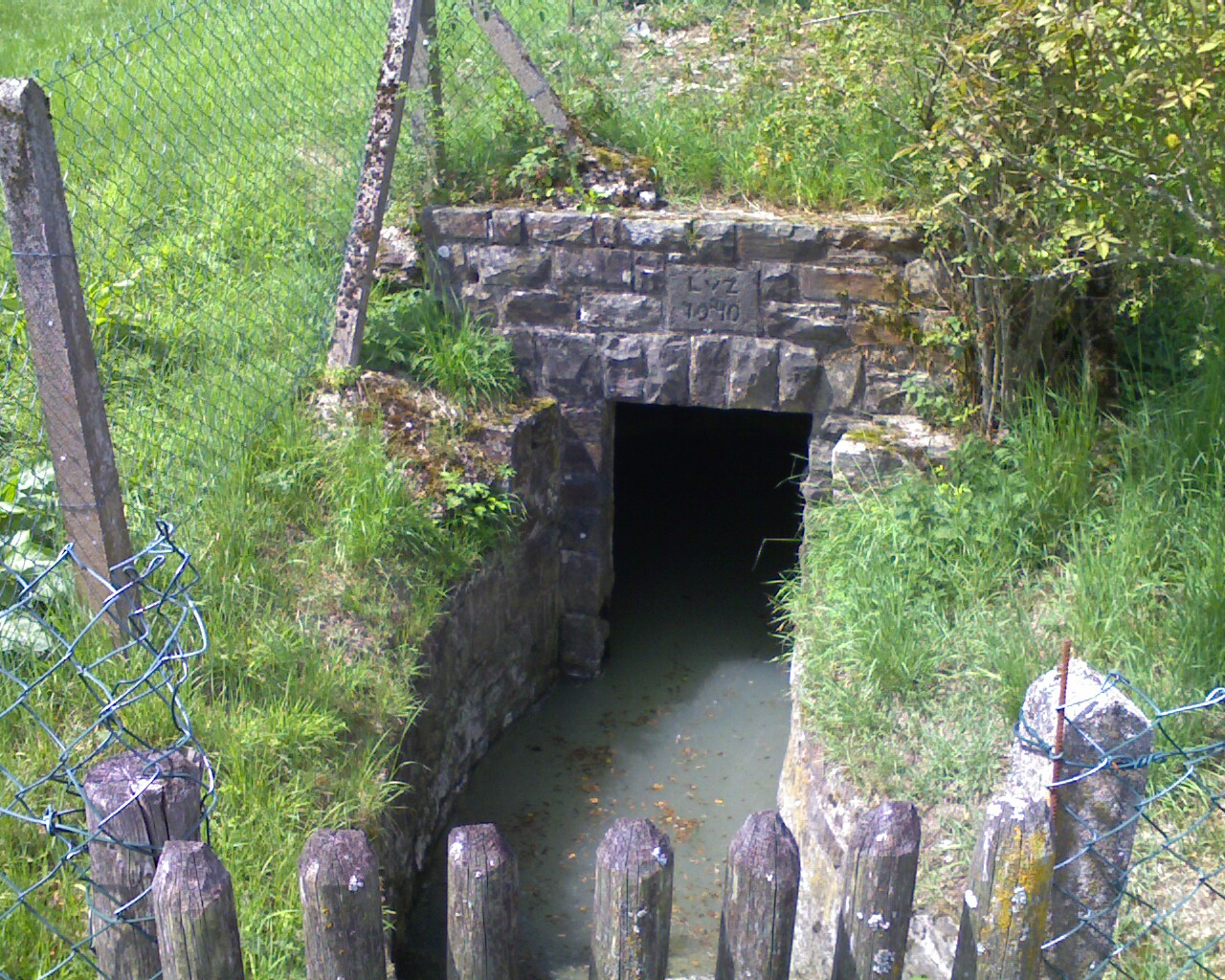
- The official source of the Lieser near Boxberg

- Course of the Lieser

Location
- Country: Germany
- State: Rhineland-Palatinate
- Districts: Vulkaneifel and Bernkastel-Wittlich
- Reference no.: DE: 2678

Physical characteristics
- Source
  - location: In the High Eifel near Boxberg
  - coordinates: 50°16′19″N 6°51′23″E
  - elevation: ca. 560 m above sea level (NHN)
- Mouth
  - location: Near Lieser into the Moselle
  - coordinates: 49°54′56″N 7°00′32″E
  - elevation: ca. 108 m above sea level (NHN)
- Length: 73.6 km
- Basin size: 402.4 km²
- Discharge
  - location: at Plein gauge
  - average: 3.49 m^{3}/s
  - minimum: Record low: 18 L/s (in 19.08.1998); Average low: 184 L/s
  - maximum: Average high: 64.2 m^{3}/s Record high: 124 m^{3}/s (in 12.01.1993)

Basin features
- Progression: Moselle→ Rhine→ North Sea
- Landmarks: Small towns: Daun, Wittlich
- Tributaries
  - left: Sterenbach (this and other below)
  - right: Kleine Kyll (this and other below)

The Lieser (German pronunciation: [ˈliːzɐ]) is a small river in Rhineland-Palatinate, Germany, a left tributary of the Moselle. It rises in the Eifel, near Boxberg, north of Daun. The Lieser flows south through Daun, Manderscheid and Wittlich. It flows into the Moselle west of the village of Lieser.

== See also ==
- List of rivers of Rhineland-Palatinate
