= Demerath =

- Municipality
- Coat of arms

- Location of Demerath within Vulkaneifel district
- Interactive map of Demerath
- Location within Germany Location within Rhineland-Palatinate
- Coordinates: 50°10′31″N 6°56′42″E
- Country: Germany
- State: Rhineland-Palatinate
- District: Vulkaneifel
- Municipal assoc.: Daun

Area
  - Total: 10.51 km^{2} (4.06 sq mi)
- Elevation: 440 m (1,440 ft)

Population (2025-12-31)
  - Total: 271
  - Density: 25.8/km^{2} (66.8/sq mi)
- Time zone: UTC+01:00 (CET)
  - Summer (DST): UTC+02:00 (CEST)
- Postal codes: 54552
- Dialling codes: 06573
- Vehicle registration: DAU
- Website: www.demerath-eifel.de

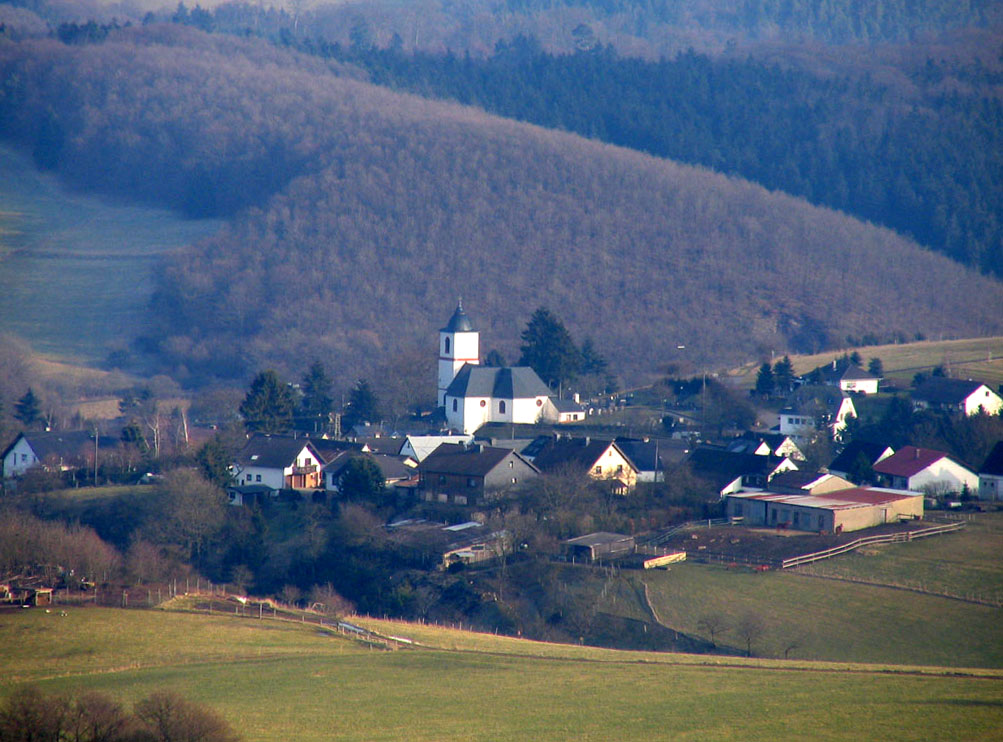
View from the west (Steineberg) of Demerath

Demerath is an Ortsgemeinde – a municipality belonging to a Verbandsgemeinde, a kind of collective municipality – in the Vulkaneifel district in Rhineland-Palatinate, Germany. It belongs to the Verbandsgemeinde of Daun, whose seat is in the like-named town.

== Geography ==
=== Location ===
The municipality lies in the Volcanic Eifel, a part of the Eifel known for its volcanic history, geographical and geological features, and even ongoing activity today, including gases that sometimes well up from the earth.

Close to Demerath are several of the Volcanic Eifel's maars; lakes that form in volcanic craters. These are the Pulvermaar and the Holzmaar in Gillenfeld, and the Schalkenmehrener Maar and the Ulmener Maar.

Cochem on the Moselle and the Nürburgring each lie 25 km away.

== History ==
In 1075, Demerath had its first documentary mention as Diemunderode. In 1319, the village was called Demeroyt, in 1341 Dymelderade and in 1368 Dymenroide. In 1475, the village church was described as the Demarait branch of the Parish of Wollmerath. From 1518, there was a high court in Demerath held by the Counts of Manderscheid. In 1644 came the Battle of the Steineberger Ley, at which many of the area's inhabitants were slaughtered by Lotharingian troops. In 1728, Demerath, Ambts Dauhn (that is, in the Amt of Daun) got a Polizey oder Dorfordnung (police force). In 1794 the village was occupied by French troops. About 1794, the so-called Freiheitseiche ("Freedom Oak") was planted. In 1803, Demerath was raised to a parish in its own right. Beginning in 1815, after Prussian rule had begun, Demerath belonged to the Daun district. In 1841, the municipality received a new police force for the Bürgermeisterei (“Mayoralty”) of Gillenfeld. From 1904, there was telephone service in Demerath. In 1920, the volunteer fire brigade was founded, as was the music club in 1960. In 1970, the local school was dissolved, and in 2003, the ailing Freedom Oak was felled and a new one was planted.

== Politics ==
=== Municipal council ===
The council is made up of 8 council members, who were elected by majority vote at the municipal election held on 7 June 2009, and the honorary mayor as chairman.

=== Mayor ===
As of 2021, the position of mayor of Demerath is vacant.

=== Coat of arms ===
The German blazon reads: Unter silbernem Schildhaupt, darin schräggekreuzt rotes Schwert und roter Schlüssel, in Grün ein goldener Stein, aus dem unteren Schildrand wachsend, darüber zwei goldene Eichblätter mit Eicheln.

The municipality's arms might in English heraldic language be described thus: Vert issuant from base a stone, above which an oak twig issuant from the chief leafed and fructed of two, the whole Or, in a chief argent a sword hilt sable and a key in saltire both gules, the key in bend sinister and surmounting the sword.

In its composition, the municipal arms go back to the French Revolution. The tinctures gules and argent (red and silver) in the chief stand as a reminder of the municipality's former allegiance to the Electorate of Trier. The key and the sword refer to the local patron saints, Peter and Paul. The stone in the base is a representation of the court stone before the church, and the oak sprig above stands for the Freiheitseiche (“Freedom Oak”), planted in the time of French rule, under which this court stone stood. The high court that sat here carried out its death and mutilation penalties upon this stone. The field tincture, vert (green), stands for the village's charming, rustic location in the scenic conservation area.

== Culture and sightseeing ==
=== Buildings ===
- Saint Peter's and Saint Paul's Catholic Parish Church, Talstraße 2, aisleless church, essentially from the 18th century, expanded in 1803, east tower from 1827, Bildstock from 1775.
- Gartenweg 1 – former bakehouse, single-floor quarrystone building, apparently from 1880.
- Talstraße 7 – estate alongside street, two-floor solid structure, 19th century.
- Talstraße 10 – house from a former timber-frame estate alongside street, partly solid, 18th century.
- Talstraße 21 – timber-frame Quereinhaus (a combination residential and commercial house divided for these two purposes down the middle, perpendicularly to the street) expanded into a corner estate, partly plastered.
- Ulmener Straße 2 – timber-frame house from a corner estate, partly solid or plastered.
