= Hohe List =

Hohe List or Hoher List is the name of hills in Rhineland-Palatinate, Germany:

- Hohe List (Palatinate) (475.8 m), in the Wasgau (Palatinate Forest) near Eppenbrunn, county of Südwestpfalz
- Hoher List (549.1 m), in the Volcanic Eifel near Schalkenmehren, county of Vulkaneifel
