= Gillenfeld =

- Municipality
- Coat of arms

- Location of Gillenfeld within Vulkaneifel district
- Interactive map of Gillenfeld
- Location within Germany Location within Rhineland-Palatinate
- Coordinates: 50°7′47″N 6°54′23″E
- Country: Germany
- State: Rhineland-Palatinate
- District: Vulkaneifel
- Municipal assoc.: Daun

Government
  - Mayor (2019–24): Karl-Heinz Schlifter

Area
  - Total: 14.99 km^{2} (5.79 sq mi)
- Elevation: 300 m (980 ft)

Population (2025-12-31)
  - Total: 1,377
  - Density: 91.86/km^{2} (237.9/sq mi)
- Time zone: UTC+01:00 (CET)
  - Summer (DST): UTC+02:00 (CEST)
- Postal codes: 54558
- Dialling codes: 06573
- Vehicle registration: DAU
- Website: www.gillenfeld.de

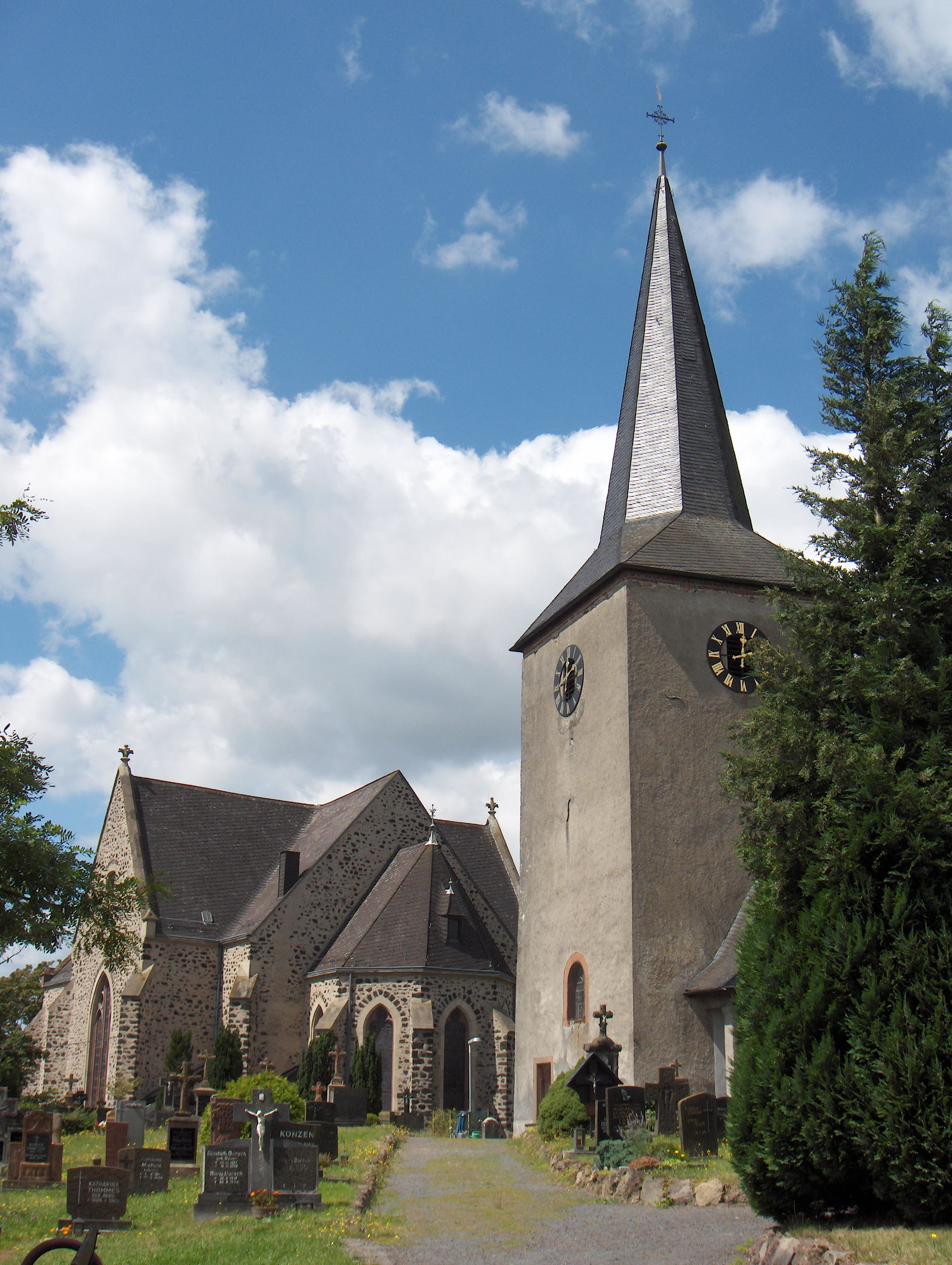
Gillenfeld, Saint Andrew's Parish Church (Pfarrkirche St. Andreas) with mediaeval belltower

Gillenfeld is an Ortsgemeinde – a municipality belonging to a Verbandsgemeinde, a kind of collective municipality – in the Vulkaneifel district in Rhineland-Palatinate, Germany. It belongs to the Verbandsgemeinde of Daun, whose seat is in the like-named town.

== Geography ==
The municipality lies in the Vulkaneifel, a part of the Eifel known for its volcanic history, geographical and geological features, and even ongoing activity today, including gases that sometimes well up from the earth. There is a volcanic lake in Gillenfeld, the Pulvermaar, and the Maare-Moselle Cycleway runs through the municipality on the old railway trackbed from Wittlich to Daun.

== History ==
In 1016, Gillenfeld was first documented when Emperor Henry II granted Saint Florian's Foundation in Koblenz market, minting and toll rights at Gilliveld. From 1016 to 1795, the Foundation and the House of Arenberg exercised lordship in Gillenfeld.

The French Revolution, which broke out in 1789, made of Gillenfelders free citizens of the French Republic, which at first did nothing to change their lives. This, though, shortly thereafter changed when war broke out between the allied powers of Austria and Prussia on the one hand and France on the other and Gillenfeld began suffering the attendant troop movements. Beginning in 1804, Gillenfelders were for ten years citizens of the French Empire and lay under French hegemony. In 1814 and 1815 came the cession of the whole Eifel to Prussia, and the official language reverted from French to German once again. Between 1836 and 1884, there was a great wave of emigration from Gillenfeld to America and to French-conquered Algeria in which 126 people left their home village. In 1876 and 1887, the village was devastated by great fires. The first struck the Lower Village and the next the Upper Village. The founding of the volunteer fire brigade in 1880 may have been to thank for the 1887 fire's failure to reach the same proportions as the 1876 fire.

Even as a parish seat, Gillenfeld can look back on a long tradition. As early as 1220, the village appeared as a parish and acquired archiepiscopal rights. Belonging to today's Parish of Gillenfeld are the municipalities of Ellscheid, Saxler and Winkel. The parish church is the St.-Andreas-Kirche (“Saint Andrew’s Church”), built in 1898 next to the old church, of which only the west tower still remained.

The events and the time of the Third Reich came to an end in Gillenfeld with the occupation by United States troops on 10 March 1945, and there came a new beginning.

In 1968, the new Hauptschule was built, and the village was expanded by the heavy demand for new building land. Then, the 1970s brought administrative reform, which led to the dissolution of the Mayoralty of Gillenfeld and the village's assignment to the Verbandsgemeinde of Daun. On 22 March 1988, the abandonment of the railway line between Daun and Wittlich led to the closure of Gillenfeld railway station.

== Politics ==
=== Municipal council ===
The council is made up of 16 council members, who were elected at the municipal election held on 7 June 2009, and the honorary mayor as chairwoman.

=== Mayor ===
Gillenfeld's mayor is Karl-Heinz Schlifter.

=== Coat of arms ===
The German blazon reads: Durch Wellenschnitt geteilt; oben in Silber eine rote Krone (Kaiserkrone), unten in Blau ein silberner Krug.

The municipality's arms might in English heraldic language be described thus: Per fess wavy, argent an Imperial crown gules and azure a wine jug of the first.

The Emperor's crown above the line of partition refers to Gillenfeld's first documentary mention in 1016, which was in a document from Holy Roman Emperor Heinrich II, who would have worn such a crown. The wavy line of partition and the tincture azure below refer to Gillenfeld's maars – lakes that form in volcanic craters – which characterize the local geography. The wine jug below the line of partition refers to Saint Florian, who here stands for the monastic foundation that held rights at Gillenfeld for centuries. A series of seals used by that institution depicted the Saint holding a wine jug.

The arms have been borne since 28 September 1990.

== Culture and sightseeing ==
=== Gillenfeld Maars ===
The Pulvermaar, a lake that has formed in a volcanic crater, lies not far from Gillenfeld, and is, after Lake Constance and the lakes in the foothills of the Alps, Germany's deepest lake. In the summer, there is a great deal of bathing here. Together with the Holzmaar, it forms the Gillenfeld Maars.

=== Dry maars – Dürres Maar and Hitsche Maar ===
West of the Alf valley lie three maars in a group of volcanoes side by side: the Holzmaar, the Dürres Maar and the Hitsche Maar. They arose one after the other along the geological fault: first, in the northwest, the Hitsche Maar, then the Dürres Maar and then last the Holzmaar in the southeast, meaning that volcanic activity shifted from northwest to southeast. The Hitsche Maar is therefore the oldest maar and the Holzmaar the newest in this group. These three maars came into being during the Weichselian glaciation and are believed to be more than 20,000 years old.

The lakes’ age sequence was revealed in the layering of tuffs, with the Hitsche Maar's tuffs buried under the Dürres Maar's, which in turn were buried under the Holzmaar's tuffs, which were the last to be cast up in the time of greater volcanic activity.

=== Buildings ===
- Am Kirchberg – former Saint Andrew's Parish Church's tower (today a warriors’ memorial chapel), essentially a mediaeval tower of the church built in 1729 and torn down in the late 19th century.
- Saint Andrew's Catholic Parish Church, Am Kirchberg 4, Gothic Revival basalt quarrystone building, 1898-1899; churchyard: eclectic grave, Family Maas, after 1863, four former wayside crosses, 18th century and earlier half of 19th century.
- Auf dem Hof – Heiligenhäuschen (a small, shrinelike structure consecrated to a saint or saints), sandstone, 1696 (?).
- Bahnhofstraße 1 – former railway station, built to standard plans, roof with half-hipped gables, goods shed, 1907-1909.
- Bahnhofstraße 3 – one-floor plaster building.
- Friedhofsweg 2 – small villa, 1910
- Holzmaarstraße 26 – former Quereinhaus (a combination residential and commercial house divided for these two purposes down the middle, perpendicularly to the street), 1880.
- Pulvermaarstraße 2 – former administrative building or school (?), Late Classicist plaster building.
- Pulvermaarstraße 7 – stately mansard roof building, about 1800, shop installed about 1900.
- At Pulvermaarstraße 23 – former blacksmith's shop (?), one-and-a-half-floor quarrystone building, about 1900.
- Pulvermaarstraße 39 – timber-frame house, partly solid or revetted, timber-frame stable-barn, partly solid.
- Pulvermaarstraße 45 – timber-frame house, partly solid or plastered, stable-barn.
- Between Pulvermaarstraße 55 and 65 – wayside chapel, basalt, possibly 18th century, altar with older sandstone relief.
- Railway bridge on the former railway line between Daun and Wittlich at railway kilometre 28.357, bridge on two piers revetted with basalt, 1907-1908 by Eisenbahndirektion St. Johann-Saarbrücken.
- Heiligenhäuschen, west of the village at the Kreisstraße 17/18 crossroads, gable-shaped, closed wall block.
- Wayside chapel, southwest of the village in the woods, small plaster building, basalt façade, from 1908, older sandstone relief.
- Wayside chapel, west of the village, east of the Dürres Maar, small building with hipped roof, timber-frame, from 1782.

== Economy and infrastructure ==
=== Road ===
Gillenfeld can be reached over the Autobahn combination A 1/A 48 (Koblenz-Trier-Saarbrücken), Mehren/Gillenfeld interchange towards Zell/Mosel (Bundesstraße 421) or Gillenfeld/Manderscheid interchange (A 1/A 48 Saarbrücken-Trier-Koblenz), farther towards Gillenfeld (Pulvermaar/Holzmaar).

=== Rail ===
On 1 December 1909, Gillenfeld was linked to the German railway network with the opening of the Maare-Mosel-Bahn. Since 29 May 1988, however, Gillenfeld can no longer be reached by train.
