= Steineberg =

- Municipality
- Coat of arms

- Location of Steineberg within Vulkaneifel district
- Interactive map of Steineberg
- Location within Germany Location within Rhineland-Palatinate
- Coordinates: 50°10′48.53″N 6°54′52.86″E
- Country: Germany
- State: Rhineland-Palatinate
- District: Vulkaneifel
- Municipal assoc.: Daun

Government
  - Mayor (2019–24): Harald Dahlem

Area
  - Total: 2.93 km^{2} (1.13 sq mi)
- Elevation: 525 m (1,722 ft)

Population (2025-12-31)
  - Total: 187
  - Density: 63.8/km^{2} (165/sq mi)
- Time zone: UTC+01:00 (CET)
  - Summer (DST): UTC+02:00 (CEST)
- Postal codes: 54552
- Dialling codes: 06573
- Vehicle registration: DAU
- Website: www.steineberg.de

Steineberg is an Ortsgemeinde – a municipality belonging to a Verbandsgemeinde, a kind of collective municipality – in the Vulkaneifel district in Rhineland-Palatinate, Germany. It belongs to the Verbandsgemeinde of Daun, whose seat is in the like-named town.

== Geography ==
=== Location ===
The municipality lies in the Vulkaneifel, a part of the Eifel known for its volcanic history, geographical and geological features, and even ongoing activity today, including gases that sometimes well up from the earth.

The village, which lies somewhat back from the Daun Maars, is actually a typical street village (by some definitions, a “thorpe”). Over the last few decades, particularly since the 1970s, the village has been growing. New building areas have been opened. Today, along the now four streets, live 240 inhabitants.

Steineberg lies south of the High Eifel, some 20 km north of the Moselle valley, near the district seat of Daun. The village's midpoint sits at an elevation of 530 m above sea level. The highest elevation, at 557 m above sea level, is the Steineberger Ley. The municipal area comprises 124 ha of wooded land and 169 ha of cropland and meadows.

=== Neighbouring municipalities ===
Steineberg borders in the north on the municipality of Steiningen, in the east on the municipality of Demerath, in the south on the municipality of Ellscheid and in the west on the municipality of Mehren.

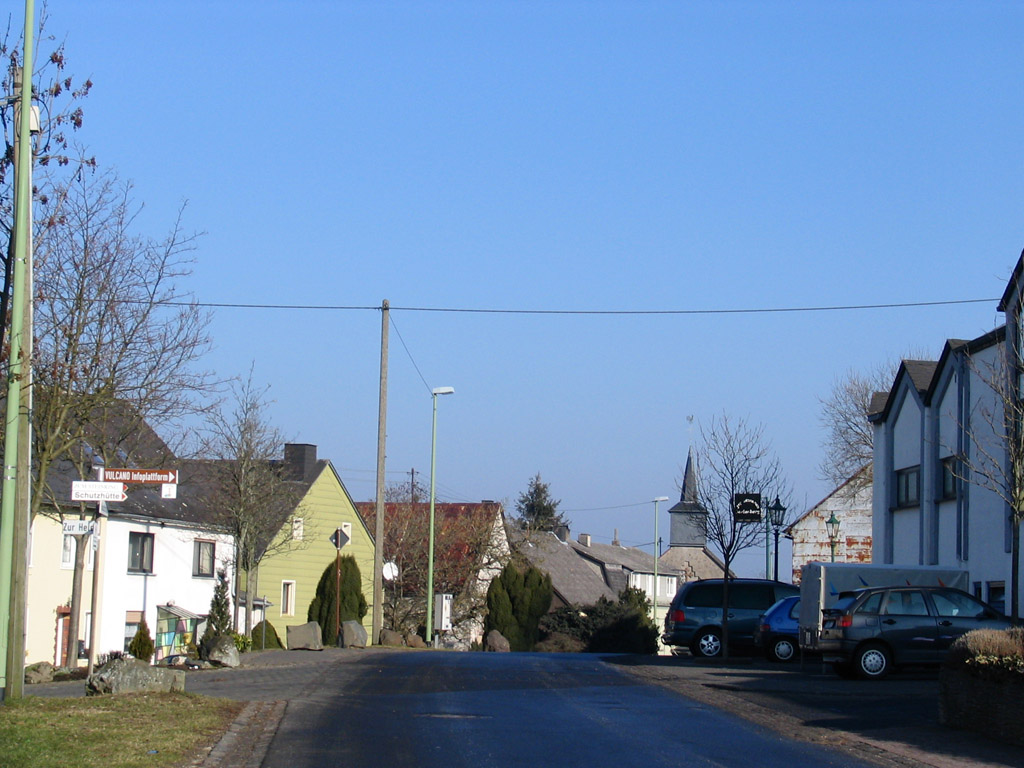
View along Steineberg's main street

== History ==
In prehistoric times, the Celts built a stone refuge castle on the Steineberger Ley.

In the Middle Ages, Steineberg belonged to the Electorate of Trier as part of the Amt of Daun.

Until 1967, many workers from Steineberg worked at the basalt quarry.

== Politics ==
=== Municipal council ===
The council is made up of 6 council members, who were elected by majority vote at the municipal election held on 7 June 2009, and the honorary mayor as chairman.

=== Mayor ===
Steineberg's mayor is Harald Dahlem.

=== Coat of arms ===
The German blazon reads: In Silber eine grüne Spitze, darin 3 silberne Steine, vorne ein rotes Schwert, hinten eine rote Taube.

The municipality's arms might in English heraldic language be described thus: Argent a pile transposed throughout vert charged with three stones of the field, one resting on the other two, dexter a sword palewise gules, the hilt to chief, and sinister a dove of the last.

The “pile transposed” (that is, the wedge-shaped charge) stands for the Steineberger Ley, the 560 m-high volcanic cone that defines the local scenery. On this mountain, the Celts built a defensive wall out of basalt stones and logs that served the local people as a refuge castle. The stones symbolize this place. They and the mountain are also the origin of the municipality's name (Steine = stones; Berg = mountain).

The sword on the dexter (armsbearer's right, viewer's left) side is meant to stand for the so-called Schwedenschlacht (“Swede Battle”) in the Thirty Years' War, which was supposedly fought near the Steineberger Ley. In this battle, many peasants are said to have died by the sword. The dove on the sinister (armsbearer's left, viewer's right) side symbolizes Saint Francis of Assisi, the municipality's patron saint, for it is one of his attributes.

The tincture vert (green) seen in the pile transposed stands for the village's scenically charming surroundings. The tinctures gules and argent (red and silver) stand for Steineberg's former allegiance to the Electorate of Trier as part of the Amt of Daun.

The arms have been borne since 15 January 1990.

== Culture and sightseeing ==
=== Steineberger Ley ===
The most prominent point of interest in the municipality is the Steineberger Ley at 557 m above sea level. This mountain on Steineberg's southeast outskirts, which can be seen from afar, and which stretches to the neighbouring municipality of Steiningen, is important to history and tourism. This thickly wooded mountain is the subject of many legends and historical events.

It had its beginning in the Eifel’s once much livelier vulcanism about 35,000,000 years ago in the Tertiary. Steineberg then lay in a north-south band that was characterized by a particularly high level of volcanic activity. As a result of these natural forces, the Steineberger Ley’s bedrock is solid basalt.

The second word in the name, Ley, is a word often used in the Eifel area, and it means “cliff” or “crag”. Another well known occurrence of this term is in the name Loreley.

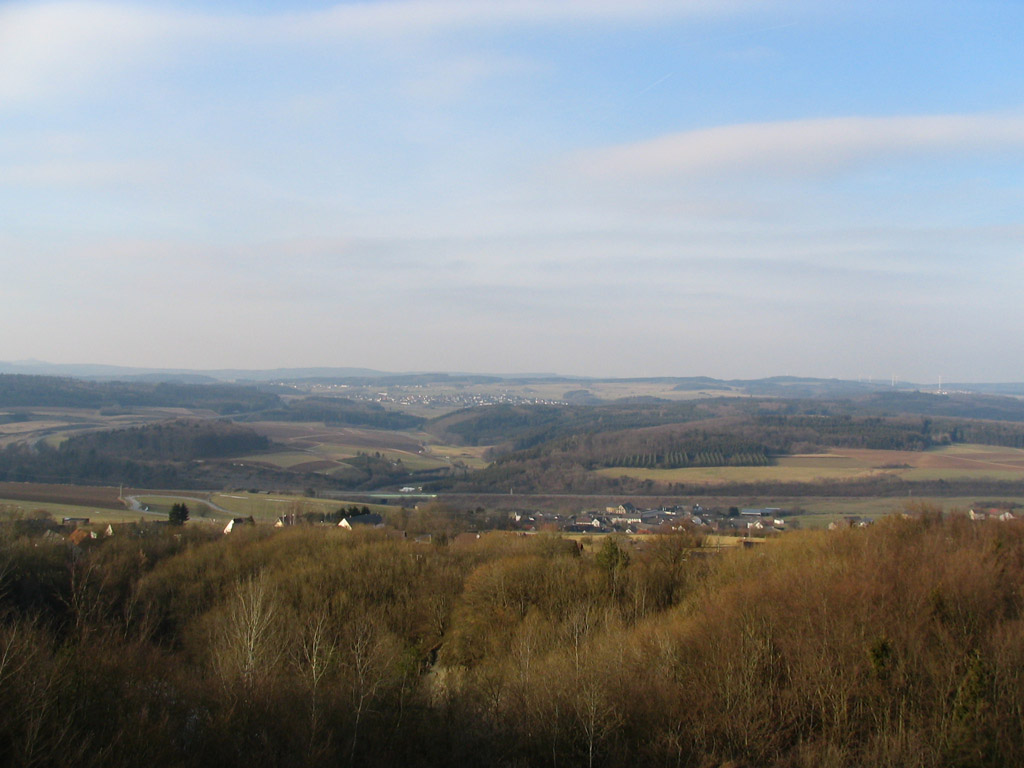
View of the Vulcano-Infoplattform over Steineberg and Steiningen, looking towards Darscheid

=== Vulcano Infoplattform ===
On 3 October 2003, the Vulcano Infoplattform of the municipality of Steineberg was opened on the Steineberger Ley. The 28 m-tall tower rose with the help of subsidies from the European Union, the state of Rhineland-Palatinate, the Verbandsgemeinde of Daun and the Daun/Vulkaneifel Economic Promotion Organization (Wirtschaftsförderungsgesellschaft Daun/Vulkaneifel). The structure was, for ecological reasons built out of 100-year-old, untreated Douglas-fir logs. It has an overall weight of 38 t and supports an observation deck 24 m above the ground.

Given its location above the Steineberger Ley's treetops, visitors can on a clear day see far across the Eifel and the Moselle valleys, and even make out the Nürburgring some 20 km away.

=== Celtic ringwall ===
The Steineberger Ley's peak bears at its south end an old fortification. Broken-down walls made of mortarless masonry and artificially steepened sides hem a gently sloping inner area of 2.2 ha. At the north end in particular, it is hard to tell natural rubble heaps apart from artificial wall remnants. An old gatehouse is believed to have stood where two wall ends clearly stand facing each other.

Since there have yet to be any archaeological investigations, the complex's age can only be estimated: The size of the area and the wall building method using dry stonework (likely with a wooden truss) would seem to suggest a Celtic castle from the time between 500 and 100 BC. In those times, similar castles arose throughout the low mountain range as rival lords squared off against each other.

From late Celtic (1st century BC) and late Roman times (4th century AD) come various finds that have, however, still yielded no conclusions as to the reasons why these peoples frequented the mountain. At its southern foot spreads an early Celtic burying ground with barrows (6th to 3rd centuries BC). Of the roughly 90 barrows, many of which were excavated in the 19th century, many are still discernible. The castle and the barrows are protected cultural monuments, any digging of or changes to which are therefore forbidden.

=== Buildings ===
- Saint Francis's Catholic Church (branch church; Filialkirche St. Franziskus), Hauptstraße – Gothic Revival aisleless church, 1884-1886.
- Hauptstraße/corner of Im Brühl – former pump well, latter half of 19th century.
- Hauptstraße/corner of Zur Held – pump well, latter half of 19th century.

== Economy and infrastructure ==
=== Economy ===
The municipality itself is characterized by agriculture, even if nowadays only one farm, dealing mainly in dairy, is still being run. Even before the First World War, many Steinebergers worked at a basalt quarry on the edge of the Steineberger Ley. Since this lay right near the historical ringwall on the “Ley”, closure of the quarry was already being considered in the 1950s. It eventually met just this fate in 1967, and beginning in 1976, the quarry became a wetland. In 1983, the Steineberger Ley was officially declared a natural monument, thereby ensuring protection.

Today, a large amount of Steineberg inhabitants work in the service and industrial sectors throughout the Eifel, mainly in Daun, Wittlich or Cochem.

=== Transport ===
Steineberg lies right near the Autobahnen A 1 and A 48, southeast of the Vulkaneifel Autobahn junction. The nearest Autobahn interchange, Daun-Mehren, is only a few kilometres away. Bundesstraße 421 passes by the municipality's southern limit. The nearest railway station is in Gerolstein, more than 20 km away. Steineberg can be reached by bus on route 503 from Daun.

== See also ==
Steineberg (Westerwald) is also the name of a constituent community of Malberg in the Westerwald.
