= Hoher List =

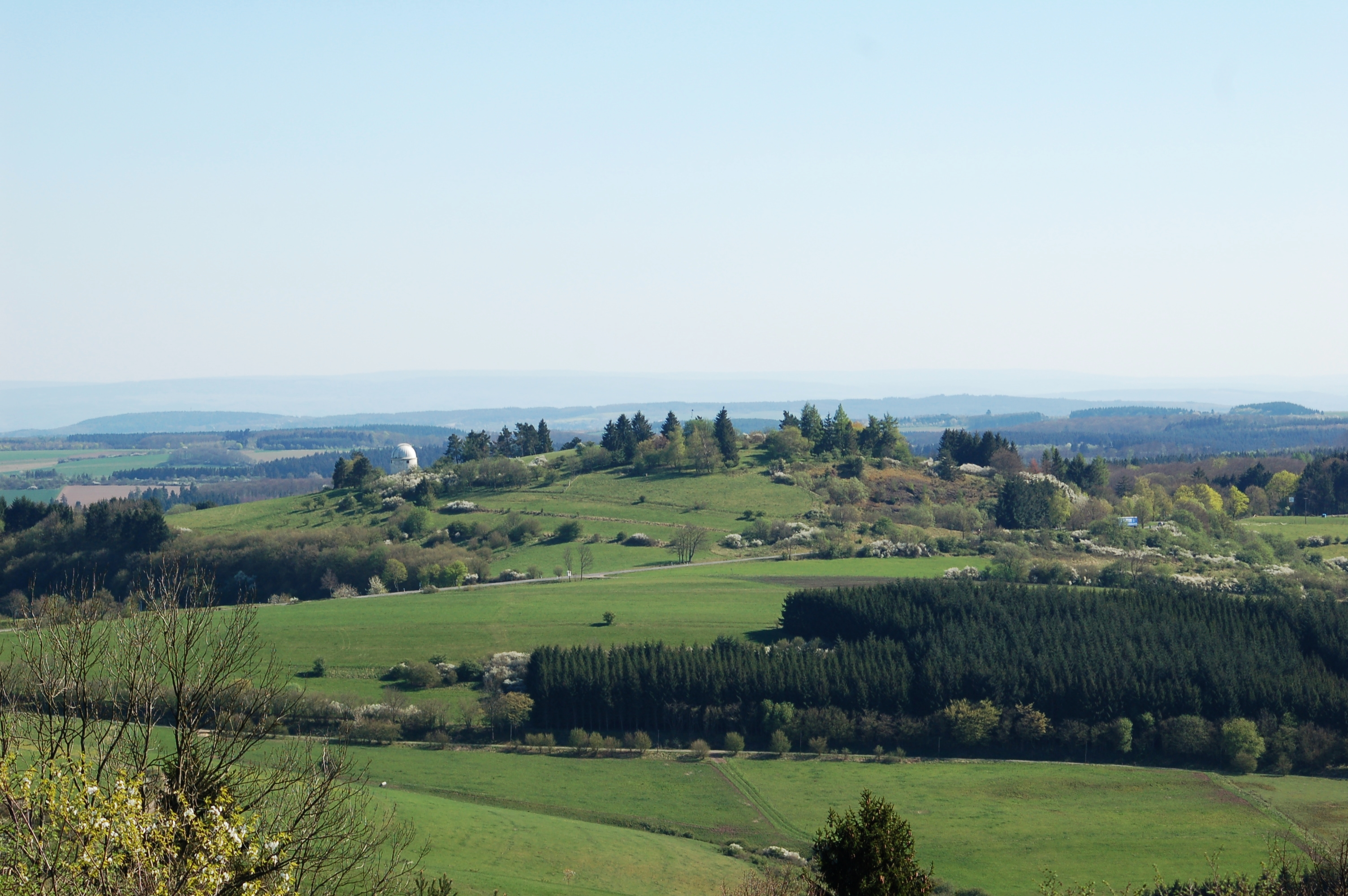
- View of the Hoher List from the Mäuseberg. A dome of the Hoher List Observatory may be seen amongst the trees.

Highest point
- Elevation: 549.1 m above sea level (NN) (1,802 ft)
- Coordinates: 50°09′42″N 6°50′55″E

Geography
- Location within Rhineland-Palatinate
- Location: Vulkaneifel, Rhineland-Palatinate, Germany
- Parent range: Volcanic Eifel

Geology
- Mountain type: Stratovolcano

The Hoher List is a stratovolcano, 549.1 m above sea level (NN), near the town of Daun in the Eifel region. The hill is in the county of Vulkaneifel in the German state of Rhineland-Palatinate.

== Location ==
The Hoher List lies in the Volcanic Eifel, part of the Eifel Mountains, in the Volcanic Eifel Nature Park. It is located about 4.5 km as the crow flies south of the town of Daun, immediately southwest of Schalkenmehren by the Schalkenmehrener Maar.

== Description ==
On the summit of this sparsely wooded domed hill stands the Hoher List Observatory and, on its densely forested southwestern spur at an elevation of 540.1 m is the castle of Altburg.

The L 64 state road, a section of the Eifel-Ardennes Road, runs past the summit of the Hoher List, linking Schalkenmehren to the north with Brockscheid to the south.
