= Strohner Maarchen =

Dry maar near Strohn, Germany

Coordinates: 50.122225°N 6.928523°E

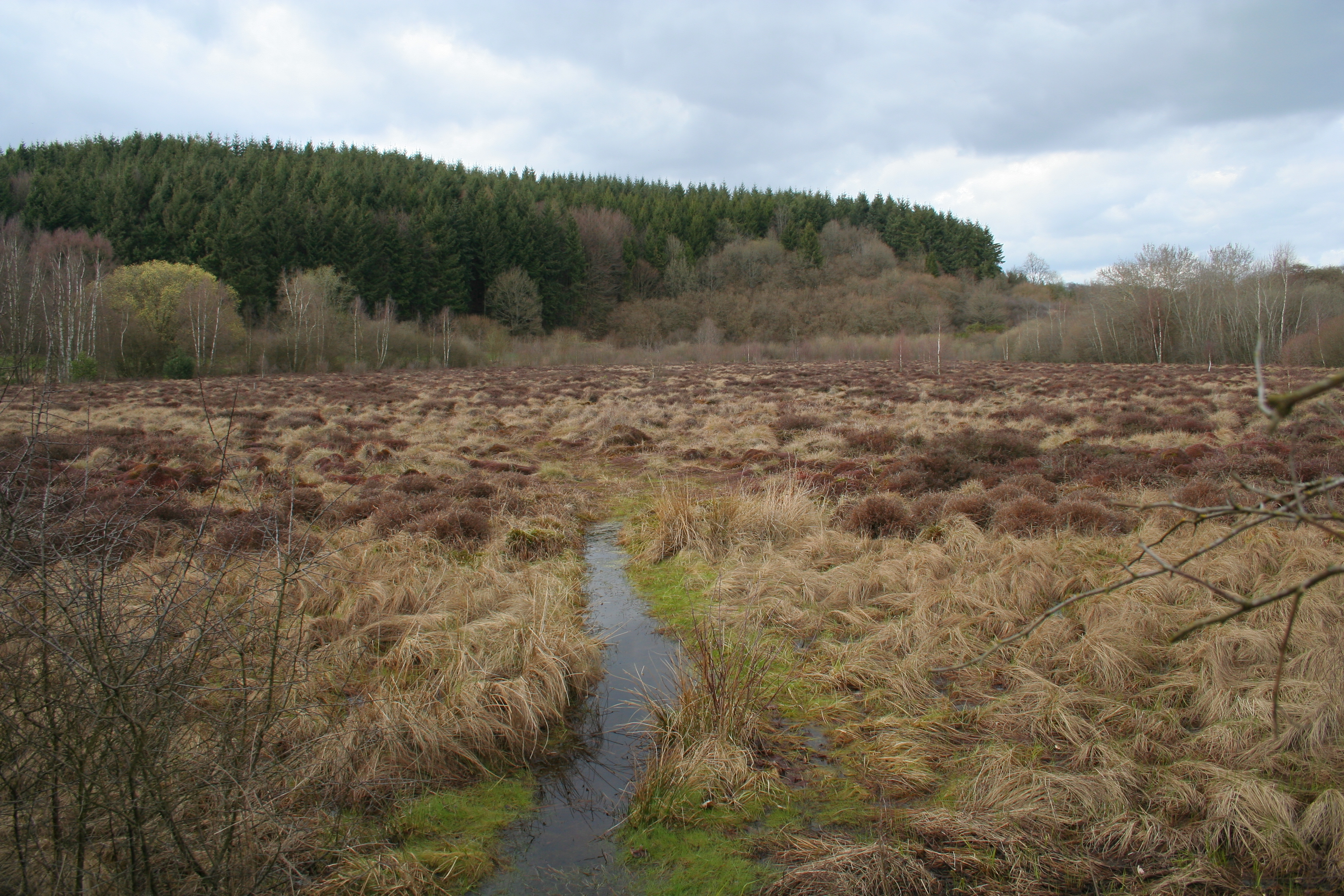
The Strohner Märchen

The Strohner Maarchen (also Strohner Märchen) is a dry maar near the village of Strohn in the Volcanic Eifel region of Germany. Its bowl forms an elongated oval and has a diameter of about 210 x 140 metres. Its name ("maarchen" means "little maar") stems from the fact that it is small for a maar. Together with the Pulvermaar to the north and the adjacent hill of Römerberg the Strohner Maarchen lies within the nature reserve of Pulvermaar mit Römerberg und Strohner Märchen.

Volcanologists from the Smithsonian Institution estimate the last eruption of the Strohner Maar and Pulvermaar in 8,300 BC.
