= Schalkenmehren =

- Municipality
- Coat of arms

- Location of Schalkenmehren within Vulkaneifel district
- Interactive map of Schalkenmehren
- Location within Germany Location within Rhineland-Palatinate
- Coordinates: 50°10′04″N 06°51′39″E
- Country: Germany
- State: Rhineland-Palatinate
- District: Vulkaneifel
- Municipal assoc.: Daun

Government
  - Mayor (2019–24): Peter Hartogh

Area
  - Total: 10.40 km^{2} (4.02 sq mi)
- Elevation: 425 m (1,394 ft)

Population (2025-12-31)
  - Total: 593
  - Density: 57.0/km^{2} (148/sq mi)
- Time zone: UTC+01:00 (CET)
  - Summer (DST): UTC+02:00 (CEST)
- Postal codes: 54552
- Dialling codes: 06592
- Vehicle registration: DAU
- Website: www.schalkenmehren.de

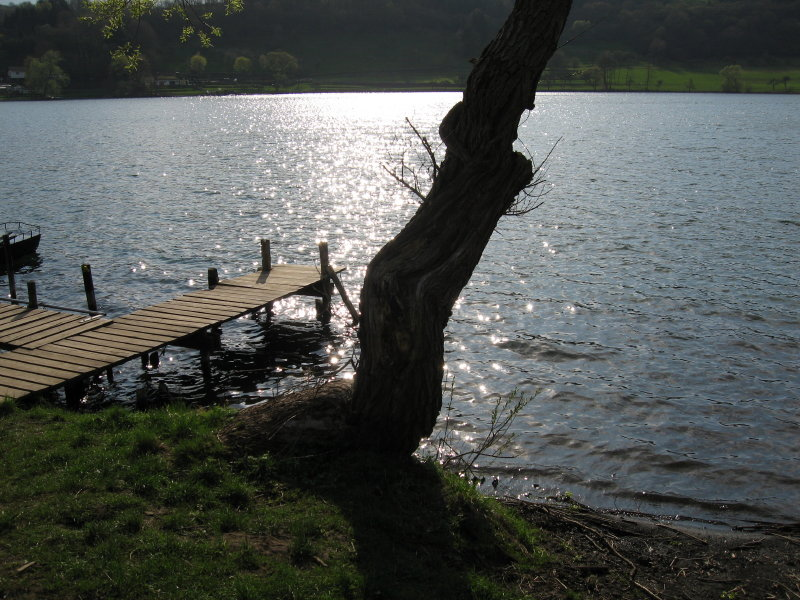
Sunset over the Schalkenmehrener Maar

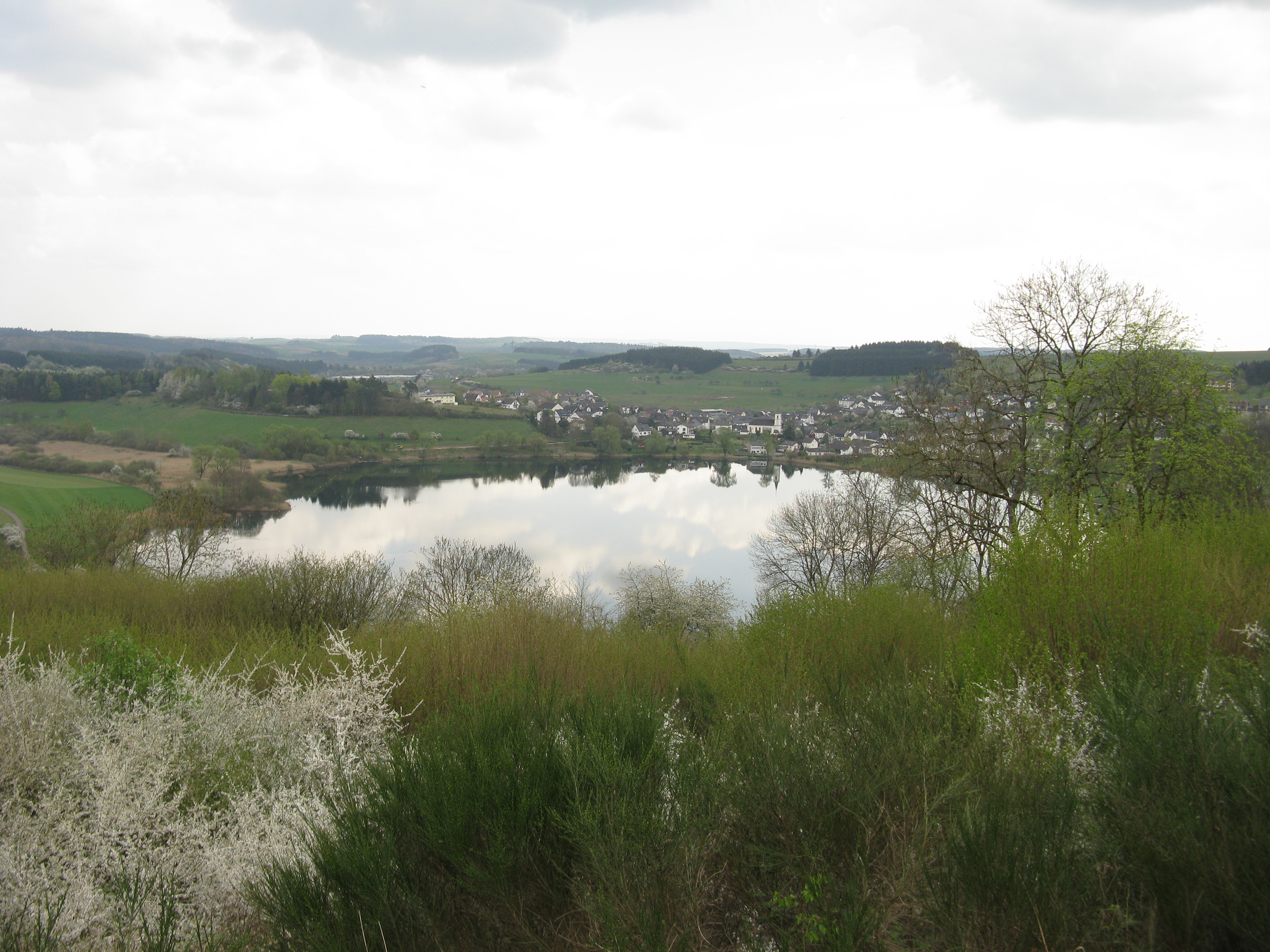
Overall view of Schalkenmehrener Maar

Schalkenmehren is an Ortsgemeinde – a municipality belonging to a Verbandsgemeinde, a kind of collective municipality – in the Vulkaneifel district in Rhineland-Palatinate, Germany. It belongs to the Verbandsgemeinde of Daun, whose seat is in the like-named town.

== Geography ==
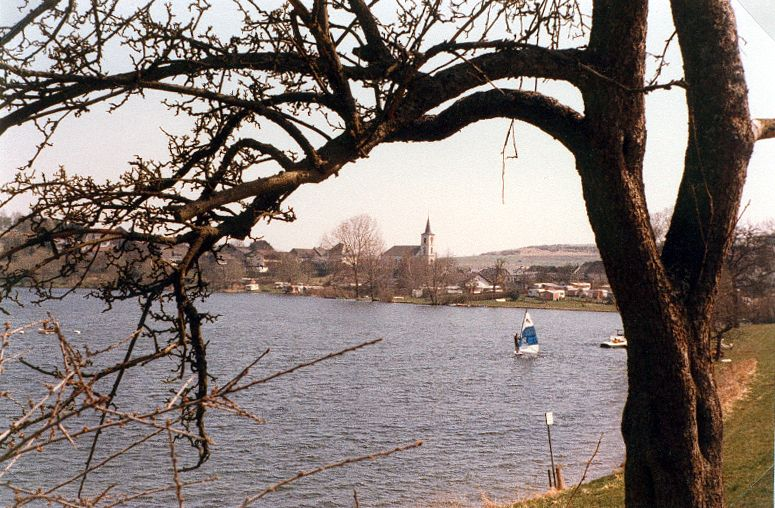
Schalkenmehren

The municipality of Schalkenmehren lies in the Vulkaneifel, a part of the Eifel known for its volcanic history, geographical and geological features, and even ongoing activity today, including gases that sometimes well up from the earth. It is roughly 4 km south-southeast of Daun as the crow flies, at the northeast foot of the Hoher List, a stratovolcano which is home to a former observatory. Several volcanic lakes, like the Schalkenmehrener Maar, the Weinfelder Maar and the Gemündener Maar, lie within the municipality’s limits.

The Schalkenmehrener Maar has a popular bathing area.

== History ==
On 25 November 1287, Schalkenmehren had its first documentary mention in a document from Himmerod Abbey.

Some mention of the now vanished village of Weinfeld must be made, for it is linked historically with Schalkenmehren. The only building from this forsaken village that still stands today is a small church which even now appears as a charge in Schalkenmehren’s coat of arms. It is consecrated to Saint Martin. Weinfeld lay east of this church, where a cross-country path to Mehren now leads. It had been a Roman settlement that converted early on to Christianity, perhaps as early as Constantine’s time, but certainly after Saint Boniface’s works in Germany.

The village’s name is variously interpreted as being derived from Weihefeld (roughly "Hallowed Field") or from Winefeld, meaning "Friend’s Field" (this root also shows up in English, in names such as "Baldwin").

Weinfeld was a parish quite early on. The Altburg (castle), built in 731, belonged to the parish of Weinfeld. The parish included Weinfeld, Schalkenmehren with the Altburg, Saxler, Udler and three houses from Gemünden. The chapel in Schalkenmehren was considered a branch of the one in Weinfeld. Today, the Weinfeld chapel is a pilgrimage site. In the yard around the chapel, the dead of Schalkenmehren are still buried, as they have been for centuries.

By 1562, though, Weinfeld had been forsaken. It was in this year that the last pastor left the now dead village and moved to Schalkenmehren. In 1522, the Plague had broken out in the German Emperor’s army. A chronicle from the Saarland reports: "At that time, warring peoples had brought a plaguelike sickness in, which in the Rhinelands wrought great devastation. The people died en masse and suddenly." Weinfeld was one of quite a few Eifel villages that were wiped out in the epidemic. The statues of the "Plague Saints", Saint Sebastian and Saint Roch, recall this time. The survivors migrated away or moved to Schalkenmehren. However, Weinfeld remained a parish until 1803 – the onset of Napoleonic times – and the pastors still bore the title Parish Priest of Weinfeld, even though they lived in Schalkenmehren.

In 1920, the young schoolteacher Anna Droste-Lehnert came to Schalkenmehren. It struck her that the Eifel farmers were very poor, and also that they could weave very pretty cloths, the so-called Maartuch ("maar cloth"). With friends from the Wandervogel movement, she convinced the villagers to found, together with her, a coöperative. In 1926, nineteen Schalkenmehren citizens joined together to form the Heimweberei-Genossenschaft Schalkenmehren e.G. The farmers wove, the farmers’ wives did the cutting and sewing, and the coöperative marketed the products. Mrs. Droste-Lehnert also designed new patterns for the weavers. In the 1930s, the coöperative was very successful, and even in the difficult time just after the Second World War, it managed to keep itself going. In the 1970s, one episode of the German children’s television programme Die Sendung mit der Maus featured the coöperative.

When the village’s structure moved away from farming and the numbers of active weavers declined, the coöperative was dissolved in 1983.

Some active women citizens of the municipality of Schalkenmehren later founded the Heimweberei-Museum Schalkenmehren ("Schalkenmehren Home Weaving Museum"), which exhibits the history of the Heimweberei-Genossenschaft Schalkenmehren e.G. They run it as a volunteer operation.

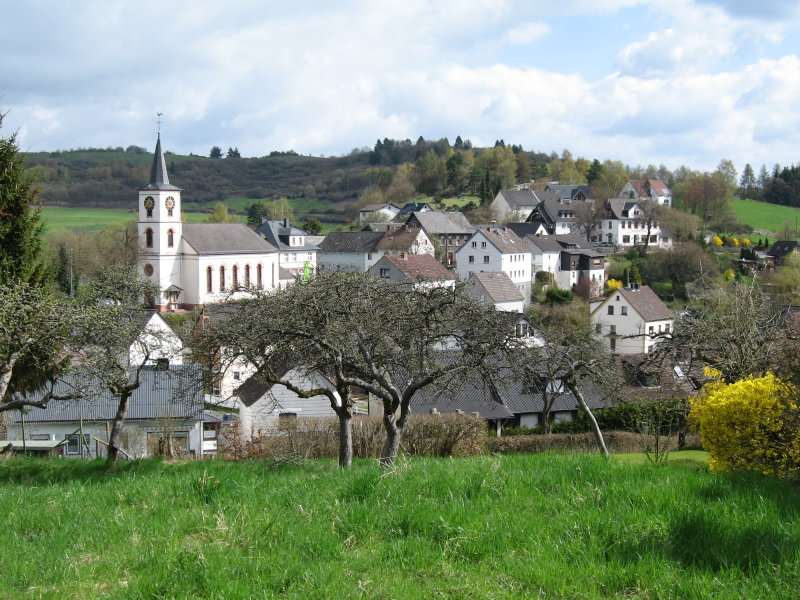
Schalkenmehren village centre

== Politics ==
=== Municipal council ===
The council is made up of 12 council members, who were elected by majority vote at the municipal election held on 7 June 2009, and the honorary mayor as chairman.

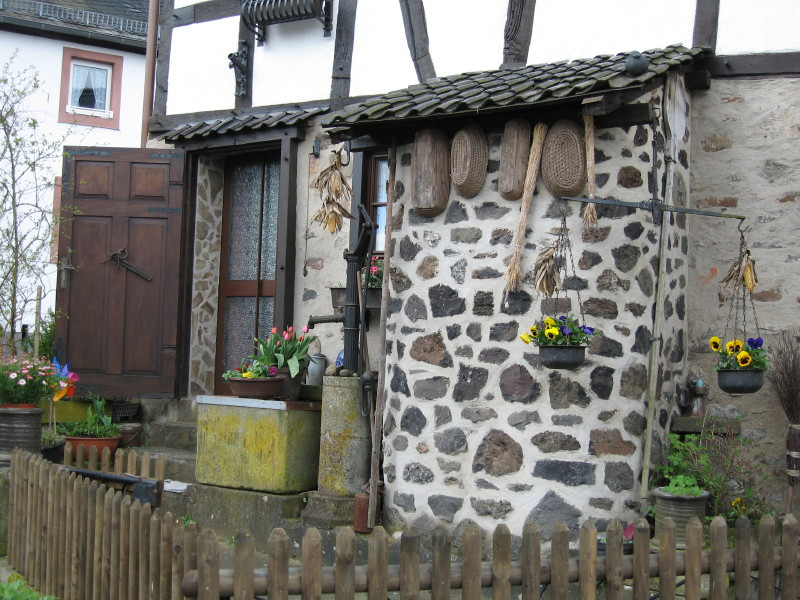
Old tools at a Schalkenmehren farmhouse

=== Mayor ===
Schalkenmehren’s mayor is Peter Hartogh, and his deputies are Lothar Kaspers and Elfriede Geibel.

=== Coat of arms ===
The municipality’s arms might be described thus: Per fess wavy, azure a chapel argent with roof sable and argent three fish of the first.

The chapel shown in the upper part of the arms is the only building still standing from what was once the village of Weinfeld. The parish of Weinfeld was mentioned as early as the 14th century. The wavy line of partition, and the fish as well, are meant to refer to the maars that characterize the area and the municipality itself. Furthermore, the fish are supposed to represent the wealth of fish in these bodies of water.

== Culture and sightseeing ==
=== Museums ===
Schalkenmehren has a museum dedicated to the weaving industry that was once an important livelihood to many in the municipality.

=== Sport and leisure ===
Schalkenmehren also has a small airfield for both motorized aircraft and gliders.

=== Observatory ===
The municipality was also home to an astronomical observatory which belonged to the University of Bonn, the Hoher List Observatory. It stands on the mountain of the same name.

=== Buildings ===
- Saint Martin’s Catholic Parish Church (Pfarrkirche St. Martin), Mehrener Straße 3 – Classicist aisleless church, 1840-1844; tomb from 1891; warriors’ memorial 1914-1918, round temple.
- Mehrener Straße 5 – former school, hipped roof, Reform architecture, from 1913-1914.
- Mehrener Straße 27 – former railway station, standard design, half-hipped roof, timber-frame goods shed, from about 1909.
- Mehrener Straße/corner of Auf Koop – wayside chapel, plastered building, 19th century.
- Udlerstraße – Baroque sandstone Heiligenhäuschen (a small, shrinelike structure consecrated to a saint or saints), 18th century.
- Udlerstraße 5/7 – plastered building with high saddle roof, may have been remodelled in the 19th century.
- Udlerstraße 9 – timber-frame barn, partly solid, earlier half of 19th century (baselessly said to be from 1502).
- Uscherberg 9 – timber-frame house, partly solid, date unclear.
- Uscherberg 11 – so-called Haus Hinners timber-frame house, partly solid, later marked with year 1742.
- Zum Scheid 2 – timber-frame house, partly solid, 18th century, but marked 1832 (or perhaps 1852).
- Zur Sternwarte 1 – timber-frame house, partly solid, 18th century, oven porch.
- At Zur Sternwarte 1 – wayside cross, shaft cross, early 18th century.
- At Zur Sternwarte 1 – Artesian well, latter half of 19th century.
- Zur Sternwarte 2 – timber-frame house, partly solid, 18th century.
- Dronketurm, northwest of the village – lookout tower, 1900-1902.
- Heiligenhäuschen, northwest of the village, east of the Weinfelder Maar – brick, sandstone relief, 18th century (?).
- Heiligenhäuschen, west of the village on Landesstraße (State Road) 64 – brick, sandstone relief, 18th/19th century.
- Heiligenhäuschen, northwest of the village on the road to Daun – round enclosed brick housing, 18th/19th century.
- Weinfelder Kirche (church), northeast of the village up from the Weinfelder Maar – former Saint Martin’s Parish Church in the vanished village of Weinfeld; biaxial aisleless church, 1723, west tower and quire Gothic, possibly 14th century.
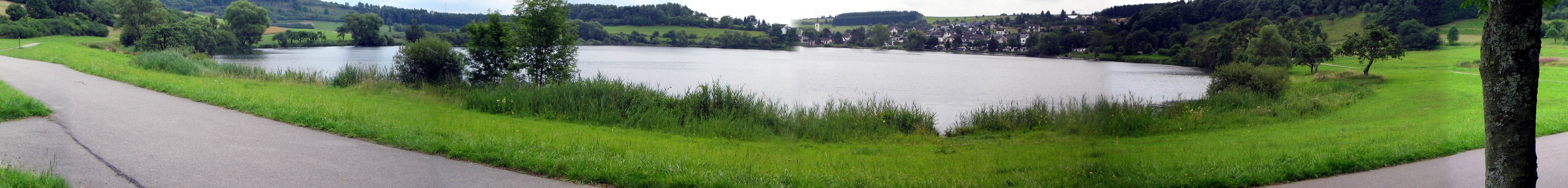
Panorama of Schalkenmehren

== Economy and infrastructure ==
On 1 December 1909, Schalkenmehren was linked to the railway network with the opening of the Maare-Mosel-Bahn, but since 29 May 1988, it has no longer been possible to reach Schalkenmehren by rail. Today, the former railway track is a cycle path, the Maare-Mosel-Radweg.
