= Dürres Maar =

Coordinates: 50°07′20.4″N 06°52′18.6″E

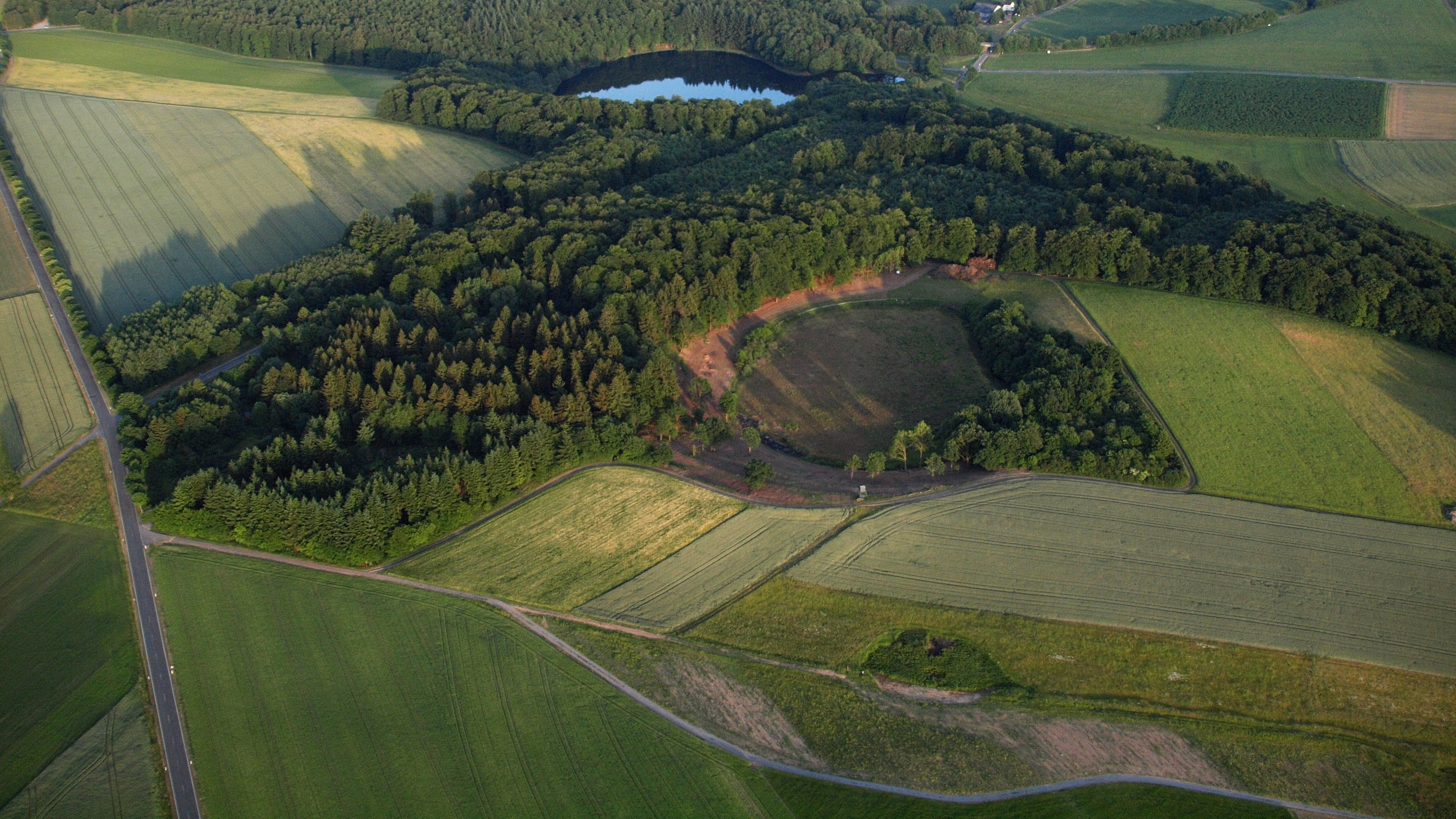
Maars: the Hitsche Maar (front) Dürres Maar (centre) and Holzmaar (rear). 2015 aerial photograph

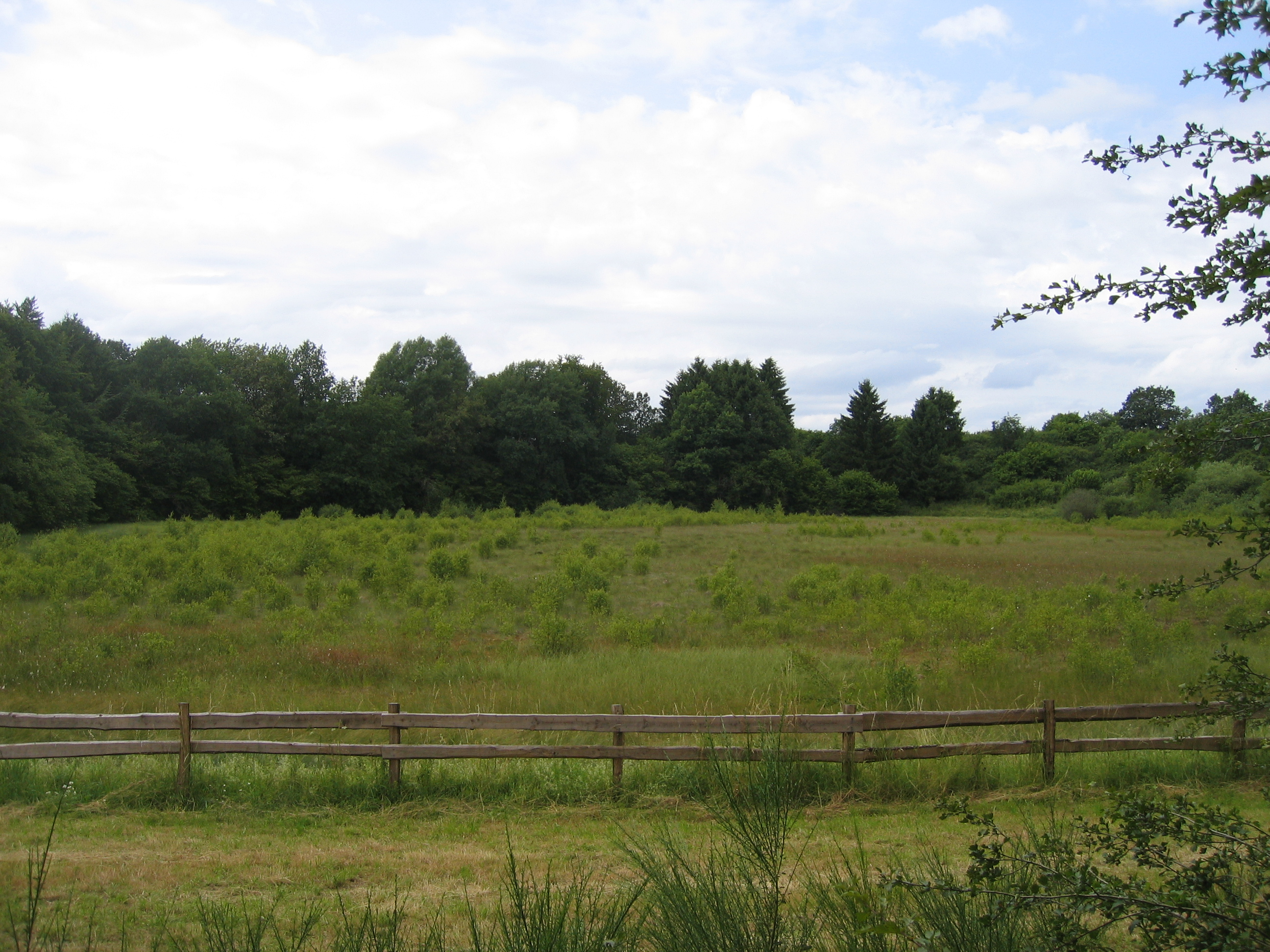
Dürres Maar

The Dürres Maar is a maar located in the vicinity of the village of Gillenfeld, Germany in the West Eifel mountains about 400 metres northwest of the Holzmaar. The Dürres Maar ist a dry maar, the original maar lake has silted up. It is surrounded by an embankment of lapilli tuff which has only been gently eroded and has a diameter of about 290 metres. The Dürres Maar was formed more than 25,000 years ago.

In the hollow formed by the maar is a transitional bog, which is made of sphagnum and brown moss peats. The peat body is about 3,000 to 4,000 years old and has a thickness of about 12 metres. Below the peat are heavily disintegrated limnic deposits that date to the late late glacial period.

The bog is not only fed by precipitation, but also be springs that are found at the northeastern end.

The Dürres Maar is protected as a nature reserve.

== Literature ==
- D´hein (2006). Natur- und Kulturführer Vulkanlandeifel. Mit 26 Stationen der "Deutschen Vulkanstraße" (in German). Düsseldorf: Gaasterland-Verlag. ISBN 3-935873-15-8.
- H. Straka (1975). "Die spätquartäre Vegetationsgeschichte der Vulkaneifel. Pollenanalytische Untersuchungen an vermoorten Maaren". Beiträge zur Landespflege in Rheinland Pfalz (in German). 3. Oppenheim: Landesamt für Umweltschutz Rheinland-Pfalz.
- H. Kempter (1994). "Der Verlauf des anthropogenen Elementeintrags in Regenwassermoore des westlichen Mitteleuropas während des jüngeren Holozäns". Paläoklimaforschung (in German). 26. Stuttgart, Jena: Gustav Fischer Verlag.
- M. Forst; R. Hierlmeier; A. Kiebel; B. Ruthsatz. "Hoch- und Zwischenmoore in Trockenmaaren der Vulkaneifel". Angewandte Landschaftsökologie (in German). H14. Münster: Landwirtschaftsverlag.
