= Hoher List Observatory =

Observatory

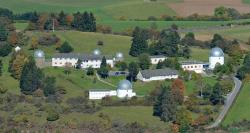
Hoher List Observatory

Hoher List Observatorium is an observatory located on the Hoher List mountain (549 m ASL) about 60 km south-west of the city of Bonn, close to the town of Daun in the Eifel region (Rhineland-Palatinate).

It is privately owned and some parts are listed as historic monuments. Built at the middle of the 20th century, until 2012 the Hoher List Observatory was owned and operated by the University of Bonn.

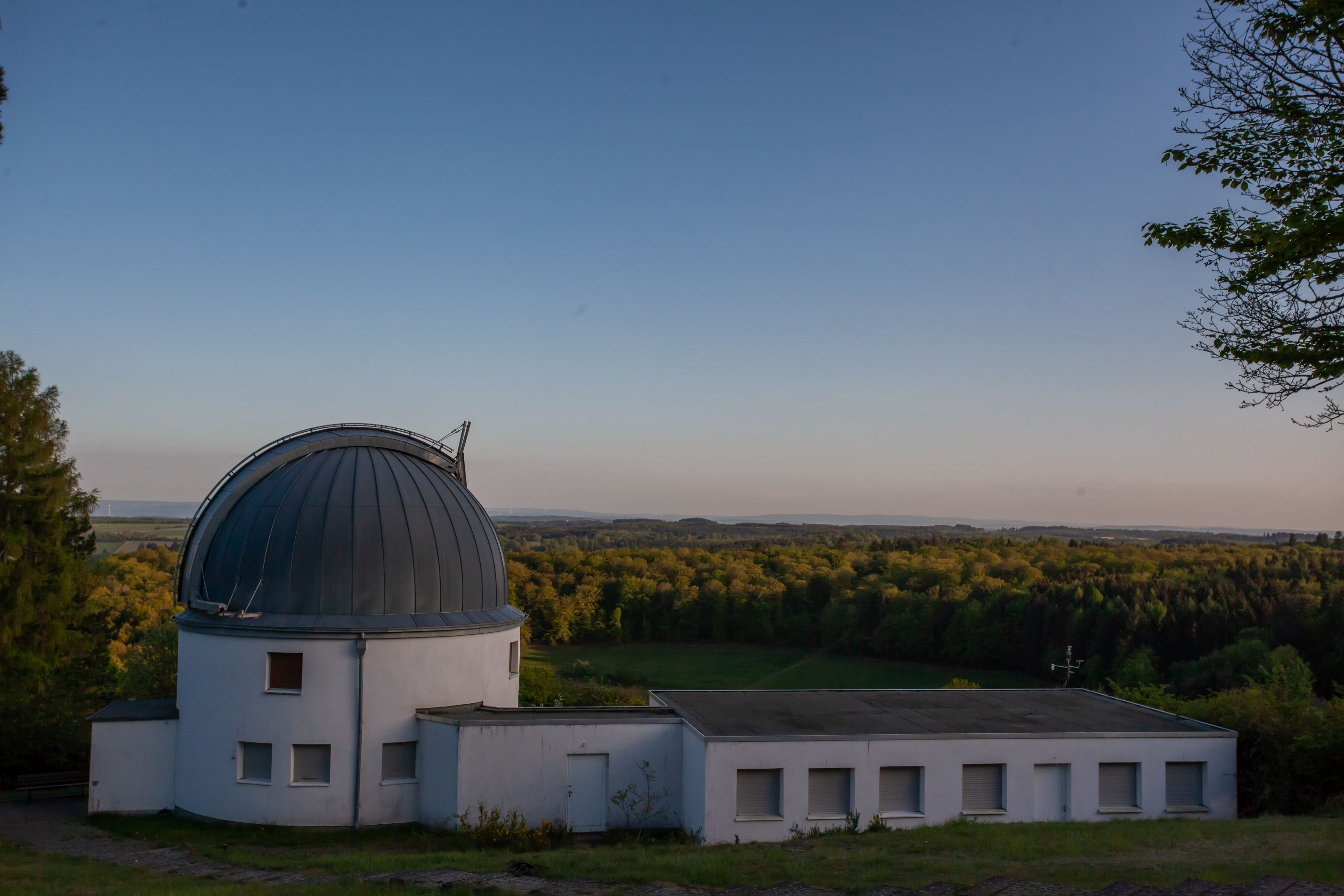
Observatory dome with the 1-metre telescope and buildings of the Astronomische Vereinigung am Hohen List e.V.

== History ==
The Bonn observatory was founded by Friedrich Wilhelm August Argelander (1799–1875). His friendship with Frederick William IV of Prussia facilitated the construction of the observatory in the years 1840 to 1844 by architect Karl Friedrich Schinkel. Argelander is recognised in astronomy for his famous Bonner Durchmusterung, which resulted in a star catalogue containing 325,000 stars.

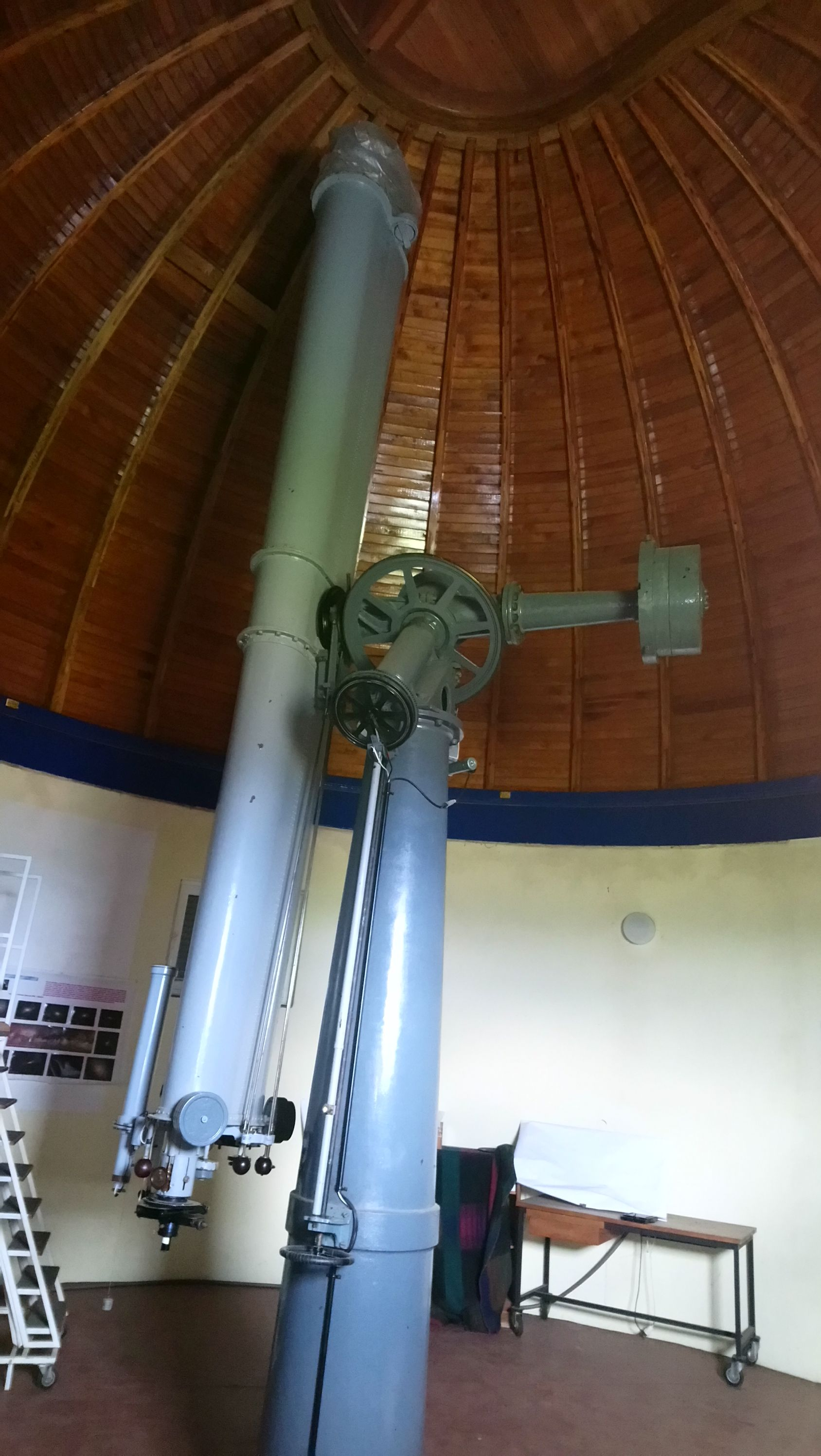
The double refractor

Astronomical observations were carried out from the old Bonn Observatory until the 1950s. However, the steady brightening of the night sky over the city by light pollution (street lights, illumination of buildings) made observations more and more difficult. The then director of Bonn Observatory, Friedrich Becker, recognised the importance of finding a location sufficiently distant from any artificial lights on the one hand, but sufficiently close to the Bonn institute to ensure a close connection with students and staff at Bonn. An alternative site to Bonn itself was investigated in 1949 with the help of a botanist who worked in the Eifel area and was interested in astronomy. In a conversation with the then assistant astronomer Hans Schmidt, who later succeeded Becker, the top of the Hoher List mountain above the village of Schalkenmehren was identified as a good site for astronomical observations. This rural environment featured a dark night sky, unaffected by artificial sky brightening. It was decided to erect the observatory there and transfer the telescopes from Bonn.

In 1954 the new Observatorium Hoher List was inaugurated, its first dome hosting a Schmidt telescope with a 50 cm mirror. A major extension followed in 1964, prompting the transfer of the 1899 double refractor from Bonn to the Eifel. The last dome of the observatory was constructed in 1966, and a 1 m Cassegrain telescope installed, which is now the largest and most modern telescope at Hoher List.

Since its construction the observatory has been an outpost of Bonn Observatory (since 2006 the Observatory Department of the Argelander Institute for Astronomy of the University of Bonn), where many students have obtained their diploma or doctoral degree, and where many important scientific projects in the field of astrometry and photometry of stars in our Milky Way have been published.

Eventually, the Observatory Hoher List lost its former scientific relevance, because scientific observations became more and more difficult in the Eifel region. The brightness of the night sky had increased, the weather conditions and quality of instruments were inferior to those of the excellent observing sites in Chile or in the United States. The observatory then served to support the practical part of student education and it provided a laboratory for the development of astronomical instrumentation that could be deployed on telescopes in e.g. Spain or Chile.

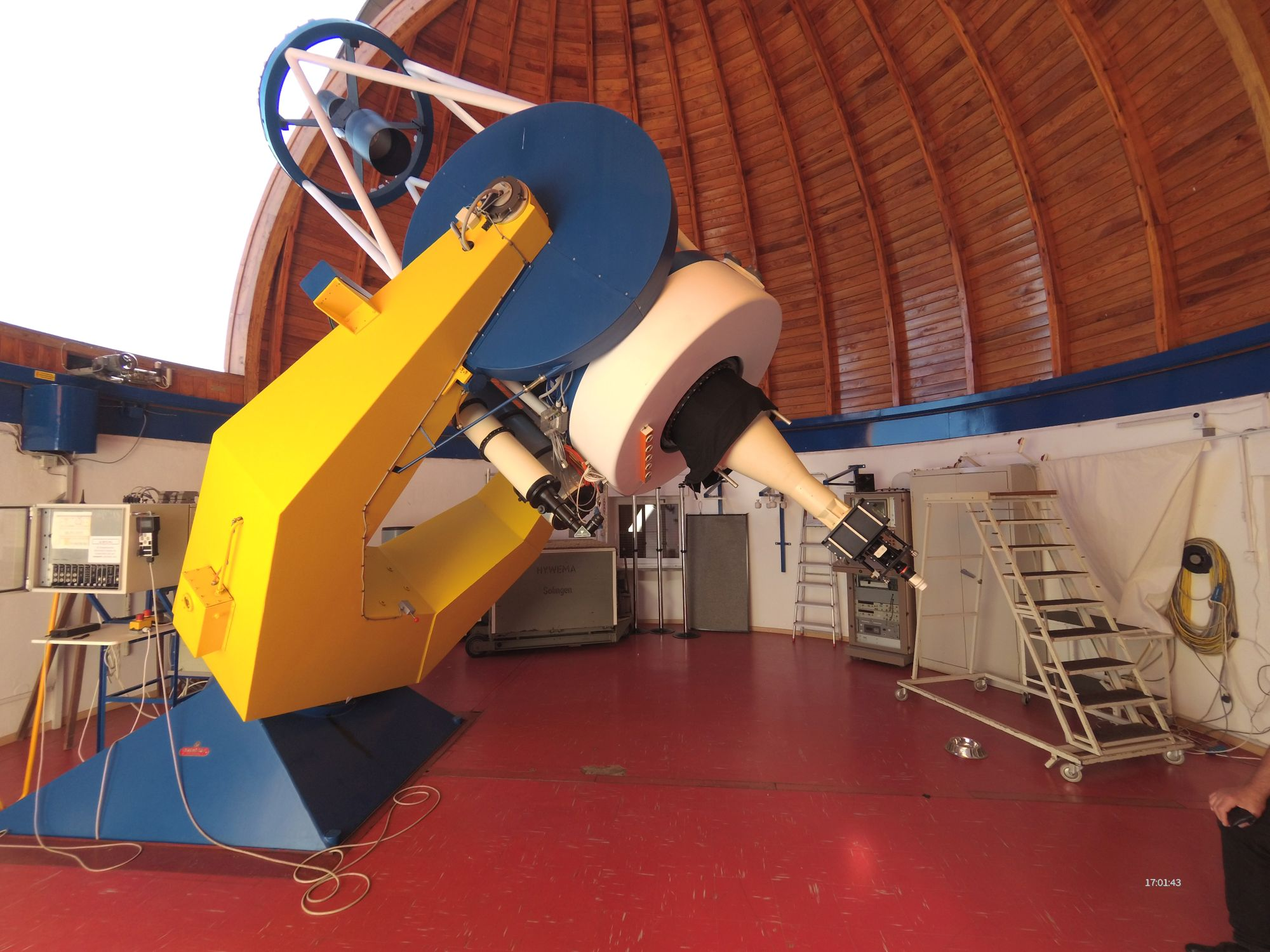
The 1 metre telescope

== Closure and continued use ==
In February 2012, the Argelander Institute for Astronomy ceased any scientific education and observing on Hoher List, and the University of Bonn closed the observatory in July 2012. The scientific instrumentation, including all telescopes, were to be sold thereafter, as actually happened in case of the 50 cm Schmidt telescope. The Schröder refractor was transferred to Bonn for a permanent exhibition. In September 2013, the entire site of the observatory was placed under monument protection by the Landesdenkmalpflege Rheinland-Pfalz, in order to prevent its full dismantling. One month earlier, the former observatory's friends' association was renamed as Astronomische Vereinigung Vulkaneifel am Hoher List e. V. (AVV). Since then, this not-for-profit association maintains the observatory by holding regular guided tours, public talks and public observing events.

On 1 March 2020 the site was purchased by a former member of staff. Since then, the AVV has access to all telescopes at Hoher List, enabling a wider range of activities for visitors. More recently the 1 metre and Ritchey-Chrétien telescopes were re-silvered, returning them to optimal performance. The following table lists the current instrumentation at Hoher List Observatory.

instrument	aperture	focal length
Askania Nasmyth-Cassegrain	D = 106.5 cm	f = 15.7/6.5 m
Ritchey-Chrétien	D = 60 cm	f = 4.8 m
Double refractor (visual/photographic)	D = 36 cm D = 30 cm	f = 5.4 m f = 5.1 m
Zeiss Jena Astrograph	D = 30 cm	f = 1.5 m
Vixen VISAC Astrograph	D = 20 cm	f = 1.8/1.355 m
Celestron Schmidt-Cassegrain	D = 28 cm	f = 2.8 m
Wachter folded refractor	D = 20 cm	f = 4.0 m
Lichtenknecker guiding refractor	D = 15 cm	f = 1.5 m

Guided tours, which include a talk on astronomical themes, take place on Saturdays between 1 April and 31 October, at 15:00. From 1 November through 31 March, also Saturdays, from 20:00, observations with telescopes of Hoher List Observatory are offered to visitors as weather conditions allow. Public talks given by experienced amateur astronomers and by university lecturers of astronomy on various astronomical subjects are held every third Wednesday of the month, from February through November, starting at 19:00, with observations offered thereafter.

AVV members and visitors convene every Tuesday at 19:00. In case of clear sky, observations of the Moon, planets, galactic nebulae and galaxies are carried out. In case of cloudy skies, spontaneous talks are given, or questions emerging from the audience are discussed.

== See also ==
- List of astronomical observatories
