= Ellscheid =

- Municipality
- Coat of arms

- Location of Ellscheid within Vulkaneifel district
- Interactive map of Ellscheid
- Location within Germany Location within Rhineland-Palatinate
- Coordinates: 50°9′8″N 6°54′55″E
- Country: Germany
- State: Rhineland-Palatinate
- District: Vulkaneifel
- Municipal assoc.: Daun

Government
  - Mayor (2019–24): Dieter Ackermann

Area
  - Total: 5.21 km^{2} (2.01 sq mi)
- Elevation: 450 m (1,480 ft)

Population (2025-12-31)
  - Total: 287
  - Density: 55.1/km^{2} (143/sq mi)
- Time zone: UTC+01:00 (CET)
  - Summer (DST): UTC+02:00 (CEST)
- Postal codes: 54552
- Dialling codes: 06573
- Vehicle registration: DAU
- Website: www.ellscheid.de

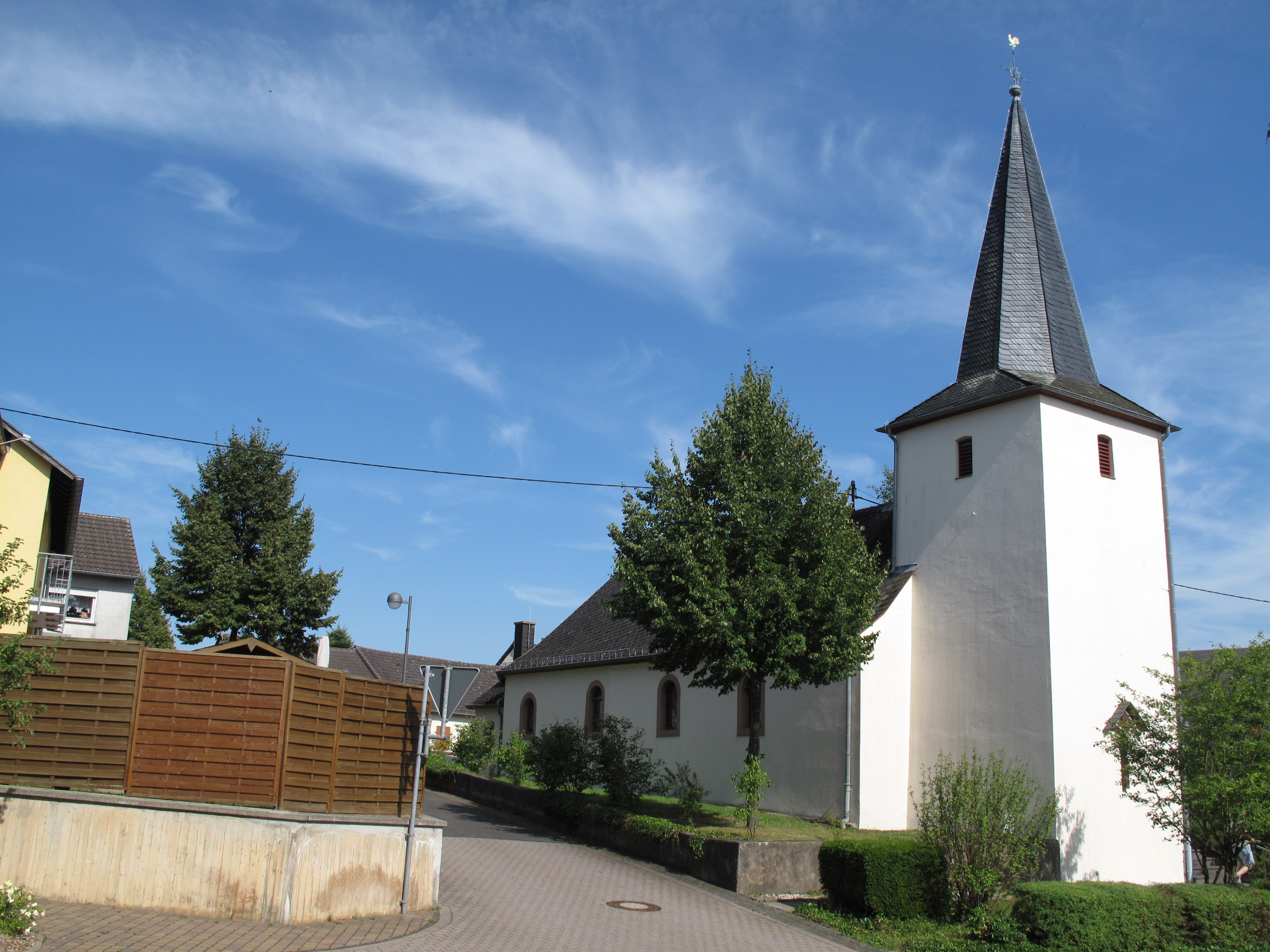
Ellscheid, church

Ellscheid (German pronunciation: [ˈɛlʃaɪt]) is an Ortsgemeinde – a municipality belonging to a Verbandsgemeinde, a kind of collective municipality – in the Vulkaneifel district in Rhineland-Palatinate, Germany. It belongs to the Verbandsgemeinde of Daun, whose seat is in the like-named town.

== Geography ==
=== Location ===
Ellscheid lies on the Pulvermaar ("Powder Maar") in the middle of the Volcanic Eifel, a part of the Eifel known for its volcanic history, geographical and geological features, and even ongoing activity today, including gases that sometimes well up from the earth. The Mürmes nature conservation area is a well known outing destination. The Mürmes is a wetland area between Ellscheid, Saxler and Mehren.

== History ==
Clear signs of what might have been the first permanent settlement of the area are the Celtic barrows around Ellscheid (Starkenbruch, Rothreiser, Jungholz‚ Hügelchen). These graves come from the early Iron Age, Hallstatt times in the 7th century BC. The best known Celtic remnant, though, is the ringwall on the Steineberger Ley some 4 km away.

Beginning about 400 BC, the Celts migrated away from the region, leaving the land to the Treveri, and then about 20 BC, the Romans came. The Eifel belonged to the province of Gallia Belgica.

The Romans were followed in the 5th century by a Germanic tribe, the Franks, who moved into the Eifel using the Romans’ own roads. Roman rule ended. The population did not become much denser until about 900, during which time Hedelscheit (now Ellscheid) came into being.

The name Ellscheid points to a founding sometime in the second wave of Frankish settlement between 800 and 1200, as the villages that arose in the first wave generally have names ending in —feld or —rath. The Franks liked to settle on sheltered slopes near water. Ellscheid might have arisen in the rural area now known as Struthsuhr, where wall remnants have been found. According to the Ellscheid school chronicle, the village there, at the foot of the Seidenklopp, was sacked and destroyed by the French in the Thirty Years' War. The slope sheltered it from the cold north wind and the site had water from the nearby Laubach. After the village was destroyed by the French, the villagers fled to the area known as Hunzestall, which lies off to the side in a side valley of the Mürmes. In two deep trenches that can still be seen today, the villagers and their livestock are said to have lived through this hard time. Thereafter, the village was built anew, this time on the spot where it still stands now. Its focal point was apparently the estate (the former Saxlerhaus), about which the new houses gathered. The name itself refers to the location. Hedelscheit was mentioned in the Urkundenbuch zur Geschichte der jetzt die preußischen Regierungsbezirke Coblenz und Trier bildenden mittelrheinischen Territorien (“Document Book about the History of the Middle-Rhenish Territories Now Forming the Prussian Governmental Regions of Coblenz and Trier”) by Heinrich Beyer, in which Beyer stated that Hedelscheit had belonged in 1136 to the holdings of the Foundation of “Our Lady at Prüm”. This Hedelscheit is apparently the origin of the modern-day Ellscheid.

Hedelscheit is made up of two words. Hedel means “alder” and Scheit comes from the old Celtic word keito-n, meaning “wood” or “forest” (cf. Welsh coedwig and Breton koadeg). Therefore, freely translated, the name Hedelscheit means “Alderwood” (or Erlenwald as it would commonly be expressed in German). On the wet valley floodplain, there might quite possibly once have been a natural alder wood, at whose edge the first Ellscheiders might have settled. When this might have happened, though, is hardly traceable.

== Politics ==
=== Municipal council ===
The council is made up of 6 council members, who were elected at the municipal election held on 7 June 2009, and the honorary mayor as chairman.

=== Mayor ===
Ellscheid's mayor is Dieter Ackermann.

=== Coat of arms ===
The German blazon reads: Von Silber und Blau schräglinks geteilt; oben ein rotes Antoniuskreuz mit 2 Glöckchen unten 3 (1:1:1) silberne Fische.

The municipality's arms might in English heraldic language be described thus: Per bend sinister argent a cross tau, hanging from each arm a bell, gules, and azure three fish fesswise in bend sinister of the first.

The T-shaped cross is Saint Anthony’s attribute, and is thus a reference to the village’s and the church’s patron saint. It is shown here with two bells, a bell also being one of Saint Anthony’s attributes. The three fish stand for the three Electoral fishing ponds within Ellscheid’s limits (Mürmesweiher, Finkenweiher and Mittelweiher). The villagers were once obliged to do compulsory labour for the Elector by catching fish and cleaning the ponds.

== Culture and sightseeing ==
=== Archaeology ===
In Ellscheid, the foundations of a Roman villa rustica have been unearthed.

Many barrows are to be found around Ellscheid. The biggest, cone-shaped tumuli lie in the “Starkenbruch”. These Celtic gravesites stand about two metres high and have a circumference of some 30 m. They might have been Celtic princes’ graves, as they stand at one of the highest points in the area. They can easily be spotted in the woods. The barrows in the “Rothreisern” are not quite as mighty. These graves come from the early Iron Age, Hallstatt times in the 6th century BC. They are classified as part of the Eifel-Hunsrück culture.

=== Buildings ===
- Saint Anthony’s Catholic Church (branch church), Hauptstraße 38, Four-axis aisleless church from 1772, west tower from 1811.
- Hauptstraße 36 – Quereinhaus (a combination residential and commercial house divided for these two purposes down the middle, perpendicularly to the street), plastered, possibly partly timber-frame.
- Wayside cross, north of the village in the woods.

=== Clubs ===
In Ellscheid there are many clubs not only for sporting interests but for other leisure activities as well.

There is a sport club which is itself subdivided into sections for football, walking, tennis and volleyball. Furthermore, there is a singing circle and a few clubs, such as the village development working group, that busy themselves with shaping the municipality's appearance.
