= Hitsche Maar =

Coordinates: 50.124437°N 6.870327°E

The Hitsche Maar lies in the Eifel Mountains between Bitburg and Ulmen. The maar has a diameter of 60 metres and a crater depth of 5 metres. Known as the "smallest maar in the Eifel", the Hitsche has silted up to form a sedge marsh.

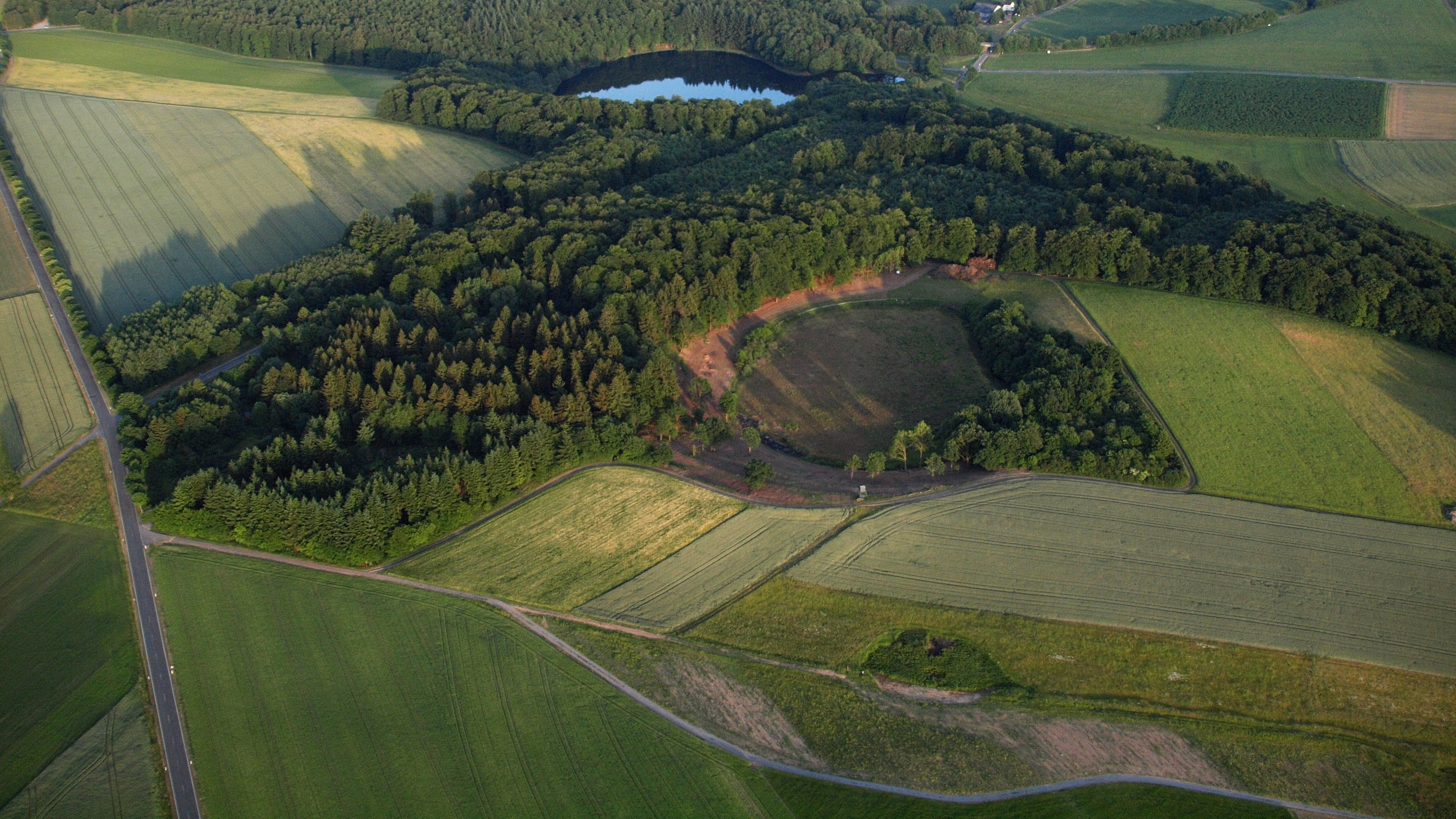
Maars in the Eifel: the Hitsche Maar (front) Dürres Maar (centre) and Holzmaar (rear), 2015 aerial photograph

== Name ==
The name of the maar, which is often shortened to Die Hitsche but also called the Hetsche, Hättsche, or Hütsche, probably derives from the local dialect word for "toad".

== Formation ==
The Hitsche Maar is a dry maar and lies west of the Alf valley in a group of volcanoes and two other maars: the Holzmaar and the Dürres Maar. Like the other two, it lies along the geological fault line running from northwest to southeast caused by volcanic activity during the Weichselian glaciation and, with an age of over 20,000 years, is the oldest of these maars. The tuffs of the Hitsche Maar were covered by the tuffs from the Dürres Maar.
