= Hohe List (Palatinate) =

Coordinates: 49.1163°N 7.6223°E

Highest point
- Elevation: 475.8 m (1,561 ft)

Geography
- Location: Wasgau, Rhineland-Palatinate, Germany
- Parent range: Palatinate Forest

The Hohe List is a hill near Eppenbrunn, in the county of Südwestpfalz in the German state of Rhineland-Palatinate. It is 475.8 m high. The Hohe List is the third highest summit in the western part of the Wasgau, a cross-border region that includes the southern part of the Palatinate Forest and the northern part of the Vosges in France.
