= Saxler =

- Municipality
- Coat of arms

- Location of Saxler within Vulkaneifel district
- Interactive map of Saxler
- Location within Germany Location within Rhineland-Palatinate
- Coordinates: 50°8′23.19″N 6°53′46.67″E
- Country: Germany
- State: Rhineland-Palatinate
- District: Vulkaneifel
- Municipal assoc.: Daun

Government
  - Mayor (2019–24): Winfried Scheppe

Area
  - Total: 1.82 km^{2} (0.70 sq mi)
- Elevation: 410 m (1,350 ft)

Population (2025-12-31)
  - Total: 56
  - Density: 31/km^{2} (80/sq mi)
- Time zone: UTC+01:00 (CET)
  - Summer (DST): UTC+02:00 (CEST)
- Postal codes: 54558
- Dialling codes: 06573
- Vehicle registration: DAU

Saxler is an Ortsgemeinde – a municipality belonging to a Verbandsgemeinde, a kind of collective municipality – in the Vulkaneifel district in Rhineland-Palatinate, Germany. It belongs to the Verbandsgemeinde of Daun, whose seat is in the like-named town.

== Geography ==
=== Location ===
The municipality lies in the Vulkaneifel, a part of the Eifel known for its volcanic history, geographical and geological features, and even ongoing activity today, including gases that sometimes well up from the earth.

=== Neighbouring municipalities ===
North of Saxler lies Ellscheid, and to the south lies Gillenfeld.

== History ==
During drainage works in 1991 north-northwest of Saxler, a Roman settlement was unearthed, as were many potsherds from the 2nd to 4th century.

In the Middle Ages, Saxler belonged to the Electoral-Trier Amt of Daun.

In 1286, Saxler had its first documentary mention when Johann von Daun was enfeoffed by the Archbishopric of Cologne with Castle Sachsler along with its fishponds and its mill. In 1362, Archbishop Werner of Trier acquired shares in the mill, which by 1479 had become wholly the Archbishopric's property.

== Politics ==
Saxler belongs to the court district of Daun.

=== Municipal council ===
The council is made up of 6 council members, who were elected by majority vote at the municipal election held on 7 June 2009, and the honorary mayor as chairman.

=== Mayor ===
Saxler's mayor is Winfried Scheppe.

=== Coat of arms ===
The German blazon reads: In blauem Schild ein schrägrechter silberner Balken, belegt mit einer roten, langstieligen Schaufel; oben begleitet von einem silbernen Mühlrad, unten von einem silbernen schrägrechts nach unten gewendeten Fisch.

The municipality's arms might in English heraldic language be described thus: Azure a bend sinister argent charged with a shovel gules, dexter a waterwheel and sinister a fish bendwise sinister, the head to base, both of the second.

The two charges each side of the bend sinister (that is, diagonal stripe running crosswise to the usual direction for this ordinary) refer to the mill and the fishponds with which Johann von Daun was enfeoffed in the village's first documentary mention. The long-handled shovel is Saint Wendelin's attribute, thus representing the municipality's and the church's patron saint.

== Culture and sightseeing ==
Buildings:

- Saint Wendelin's Catholic Church (branch church; Filialkirche St. Wendelin), Dorfstraße 20 – small aisleless church from 1716.
- Dorfstraße – two Heiligenhäuschen (small, shrinelike structures consecrated to a saint or saints), plastered housings, possibly from the 18th century.

== Economy and infrastructure ==
West of the village runs the Autobahn A 1. The village's main street is Kreisstraße 19. Also near the village runs the Maare-Mosel-Radweg, a cycle path.
