= Holzmaar =

Body of water in Rhineland-Palatinate, Germany

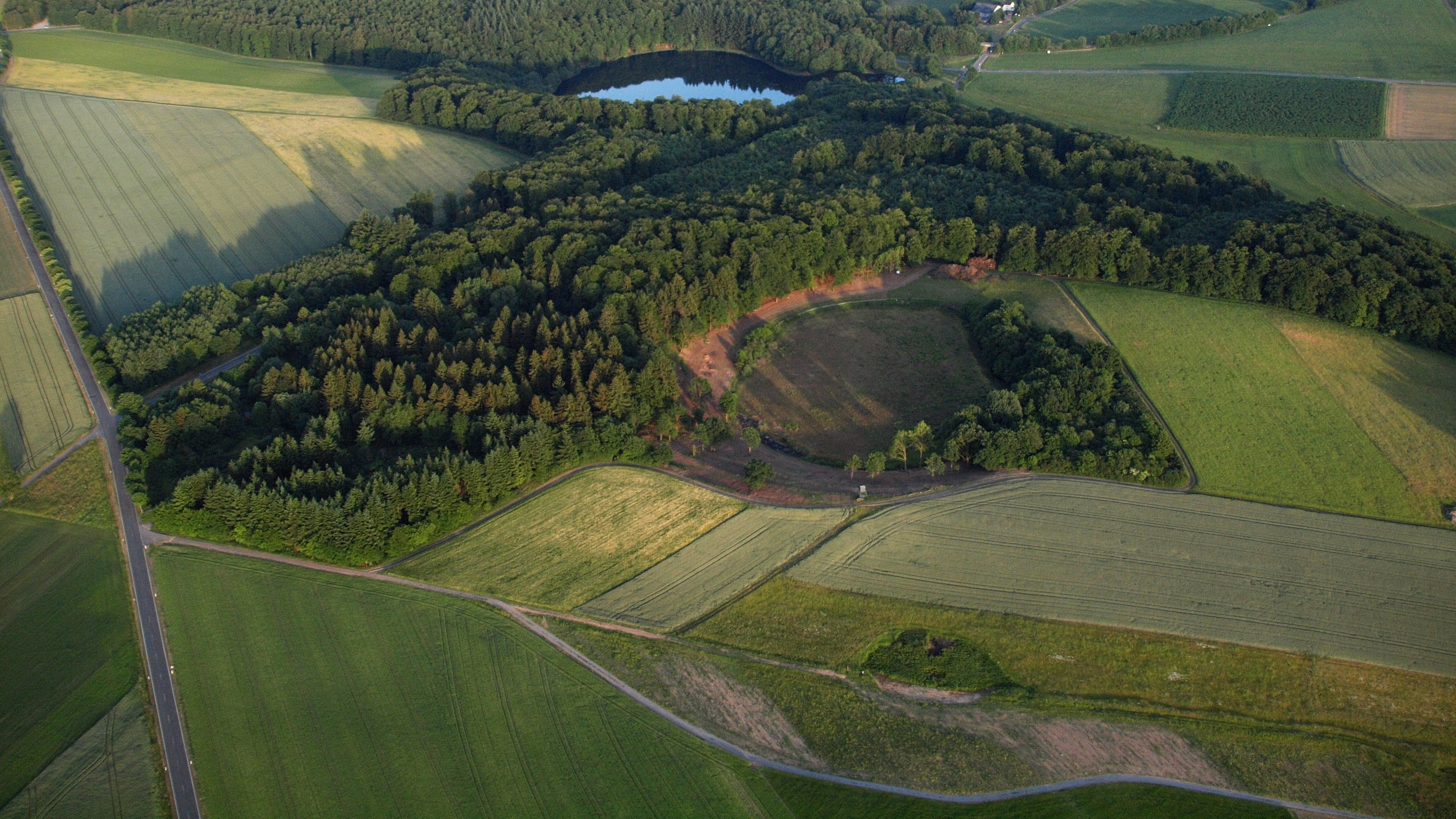
- The Hitsche Maar (front) Dürres Maar (centre) and Holzmaar (rear). (2015 aerial photograph)

- Location within Germany
- Location: Rhineland-Palatinate, Germany
- Coordinates: 50°7′8″N 6°52′45″E
- Type: Maar
- Max. width: 325 m (1,066 ft)
- Surface area: 6.8 ha (17 acres)
- Average depth: 21 m (69 ft)

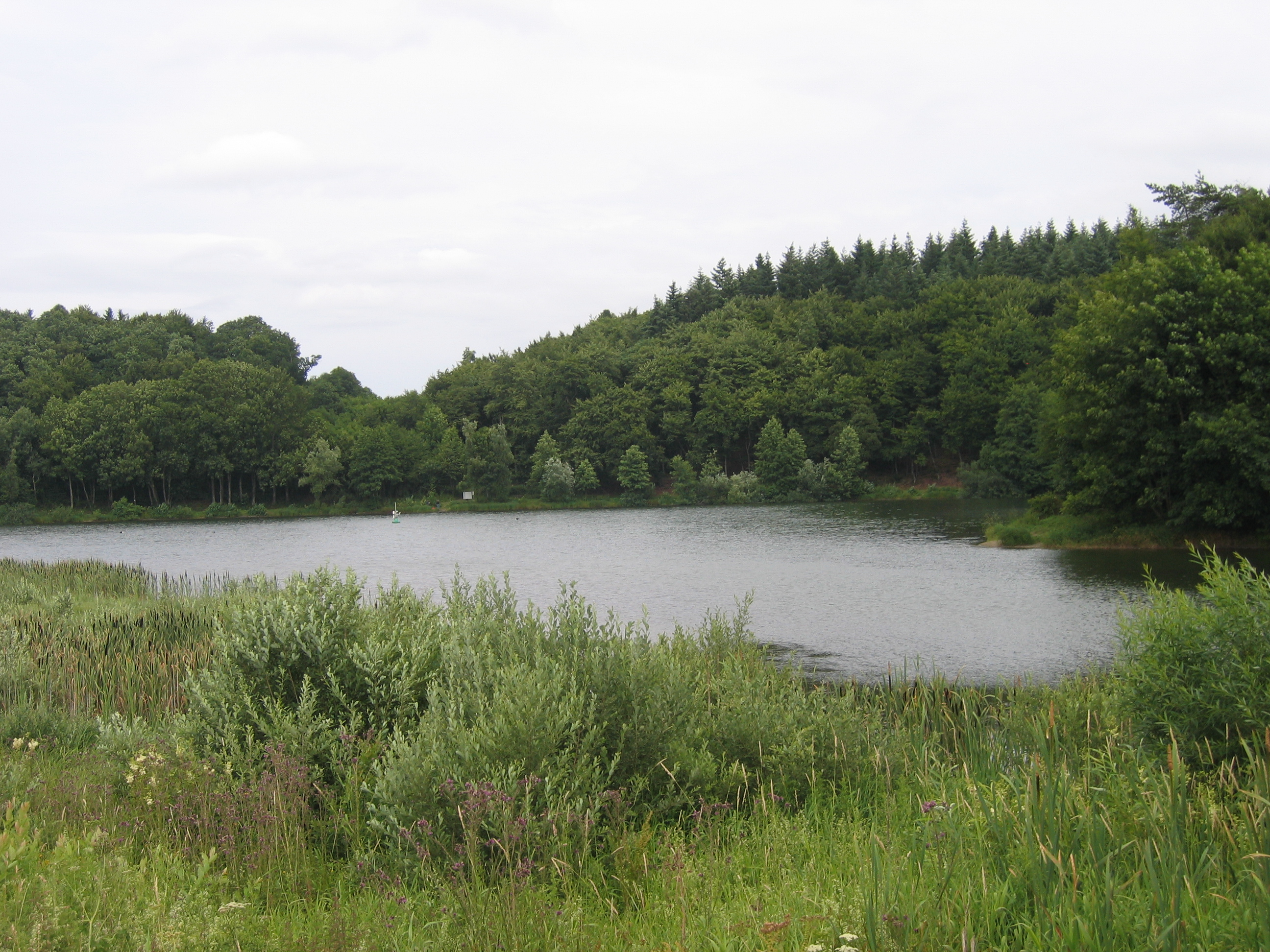
The Holzmaar

The Holzmaar lies in the Volcanic Eifel in the German state of Rhineland-Palatinate almost halfway between Gillenfeld (2.5 km away to the southwest) and Eckfeld. The maar has an area of about 6.8 hectares (17 acres), a diameter of 325 metres (1,066 ft) and a depth of 21 metres (69 ft) and lies within a nature reserve, almost completely surrounded by woods. It is one of the two maars making up the Gillenfeld Maars, the other being the Pulvermaar.

The Holzmaar is fed by a headstream of the Sammetbach which crosses the maar. In the immediate vicinity is another maar, the Dürres Maar.

On its south and southwest shores, the maar has silted up with sediments, core samples from which give a comprehensive picture of the climate going back to the last cold period. The sediments of the Holzmaar go back 23,200 years. This assessment was made possible by comparing the sequence and radiometric dating obtained in the maar basin with that of the Meerfelder Maar. The time of the maximum of the last glaciation derived from varve chronology is in close agreement with data from the Greenland Ice Sheet Project (GISP2), but are somewhat at odds with those of the Greenland Ice Core Project (GRIP).

In the sequence of sediments three zones of strata were found, when the most dust was deposited in the crater lake. If these dust-laden layers correspond to the ice advances of the northern German inland ice sheet, by comparing them with the exact chronological sequence of the dust layers in the Maar sediments an equally accurate age for local terminal moraines may be possible at suitable locations in northern Germany.

== Literature ==
- Werner D´hein: Natur- und Kulturführer Vulkanlandeifel. Mit 26 Stationen der "Deutschen Vulkanstraße". Gaasterland-Verlag, Düsseldorf. 2006, ISBN 3-935873-15-8
- H. Wolfgang Wagner et al., 2012: Trier und Umgebung, Sammlung geologischer Führer, Bd. 60, 3. Auflage, Bornträger, ISBN 978-3-443-15094-5, (see:) http://www.schweizerbart.de/publications/detail/artno/011006040
- Bernd Zolitschka, Paläoklimatische Bedeutung laminierter Sedimente: Holzmaar (Eifel, Deutschland), Lake C2 (Nordwest-Territorien, Kanada) und Lago Grande di Monticchio (Basilicata, Italien). Relief Boden Palaeoklima, Vol. 13, 1998. ISBN 978-3-443-09013-5
