= Pulvermaar =

Lake in Germany

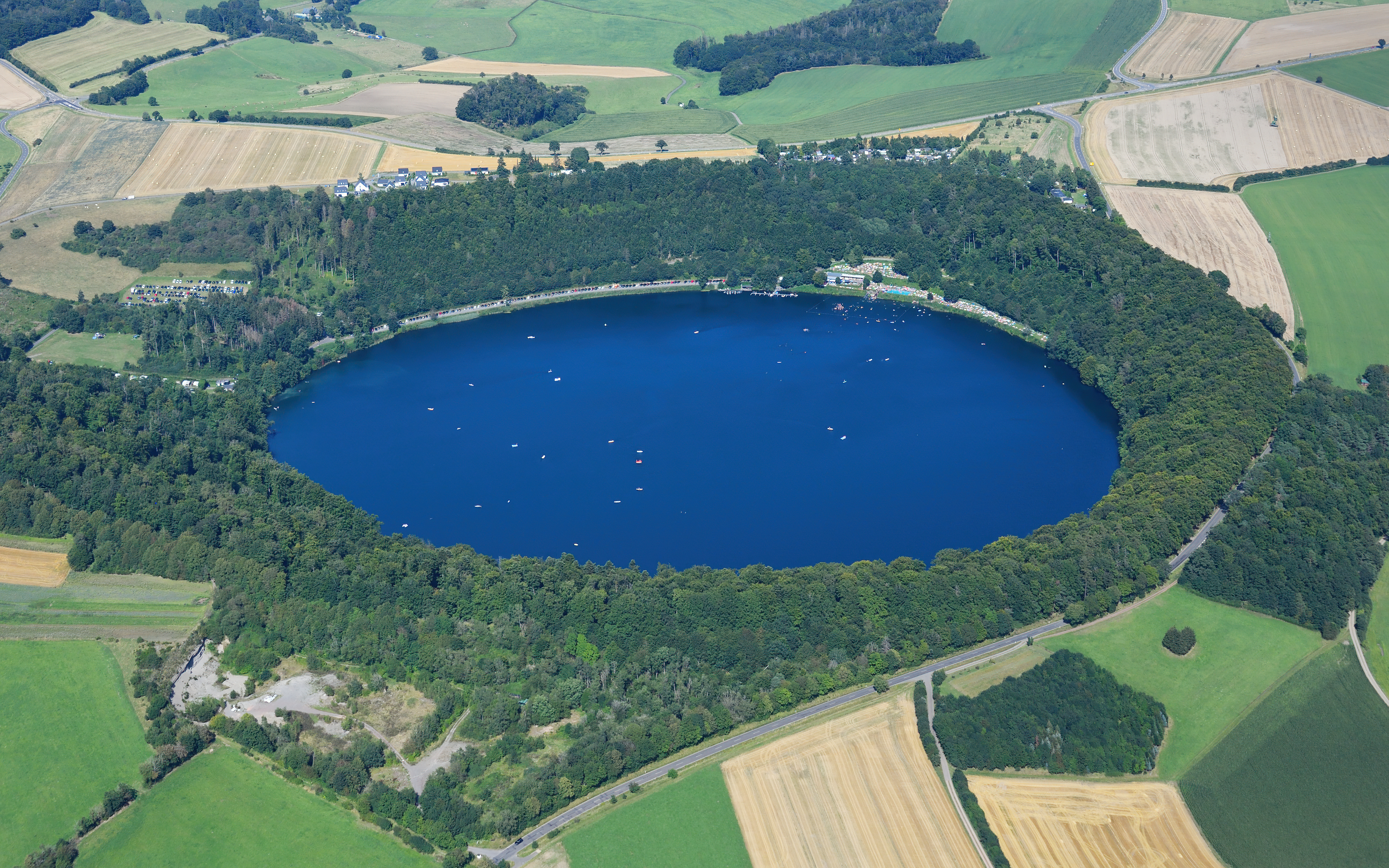
- Aerial view of Pulvermaar

- Location within Germany
- Location: Rhineland-Palatinate, Germany
- Coordinates: 50°7′52″N 6°55′34″E
- Type: Maar
- Max. width: 700 m (2,300 ft)
- Surface area: 38.48 ha (95.1 acres)
- Max. depth: 72 m (236 ft)
- Surface elevation: 411 m (1,348 ft)

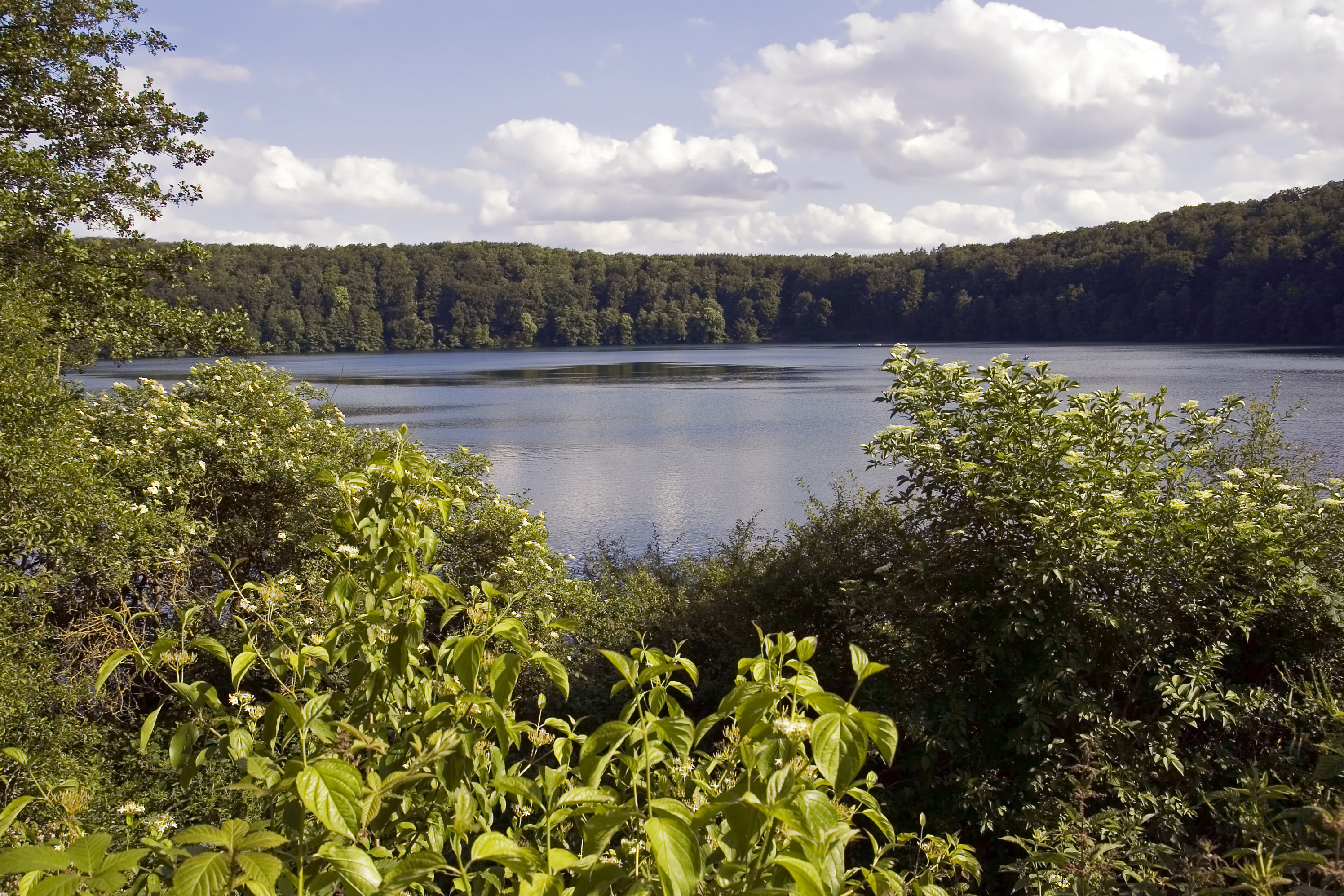
Pulvermaar in early summer

The Pulvermaar is a water-filled maar that lies southeast of Daun in the German state of Rhineland-Palatinate. Together with the Holzmaar it is one of the Gillenfeld maars.

== Description ==
A tuff site in the bog formations of the neighbouring Strohner Maar is ascribed to the Pulvermaar and is therefore older than the Pulvermaar. Early pollen analyses of the bogs gave an age for the tuff site – and thus the Pulvermaar – of about 10,050 years. More recent studies show, however, underwater terraces at greater depth as well as ice wedges inside the tephra deposits, both of which suggest that the maar was formed during the last ice age, 20,000 to 30,000 years ago. Volcanologists from the Smithsonian Institution estimate the last eruption of the Strohner Maar and Pulvermaar in 8,300 BC.

The almost circular maar has steep funnel-shaped sides. The maar lake lies at a height of 411 m above sea level (NN) and, with a maximum depth of 72 metres (236 ft), is the deepest in the Volcanic Eifel. It has a diameter of about 700 metres (2,300 ft) and surface area of 38.48 hectares (95.1 acres) and is thus also the largest waterbody of the Eifel maars, even if the volcanic structure as a whole, which measures 900 * 950 m is exceeded by other maars in the Eifel.

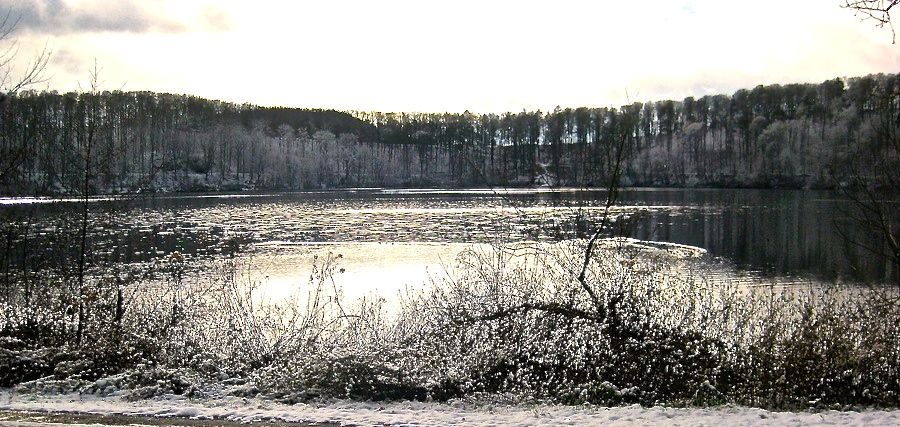
In winter

After Lake Constance and the lakes of the Pre-Alps (the Königssee, Walchensee, Lake Starnberg, Ammersee, Chiemsee, Tegernsee) the Pulvermaar is the deepest natural lake in Germany. It is likely that the Pulvermaar was originally even deeper, perhaps as deep as 200 metres. Its rim would have had a height of 50 metres.

The maar is surrounded by woods on the rim of the crater, through which a footpath runs around the lake. There is a bathing place on the eastern shore.

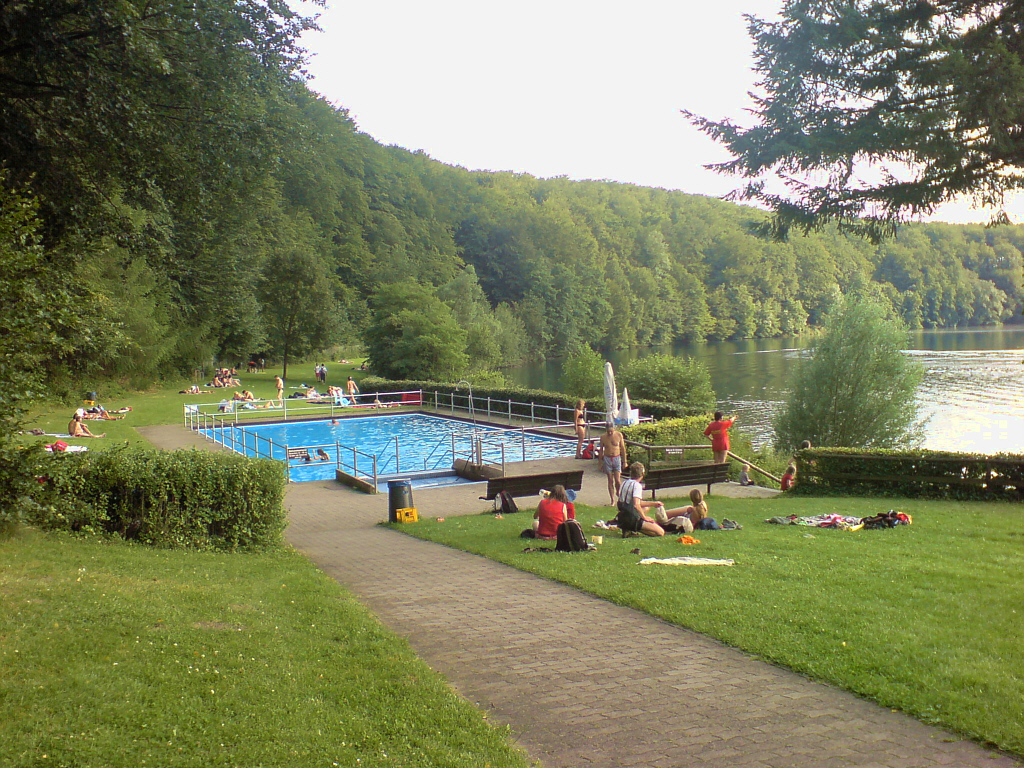
Bathing site

== See also ==
- List of lakes of Germany

== Literature ==
- Werner D´hein: Natur- und Kulturführer Vulkanlandeifel. Mit 26 Stationen der „Deutschen Vulkanstraße“. Gaasterland-Verlag, Düsseldorf, 2006, ISBN 3-935873-15-8
