= Schalkenmehrener Maar =

Lake in the Eifel, Germany

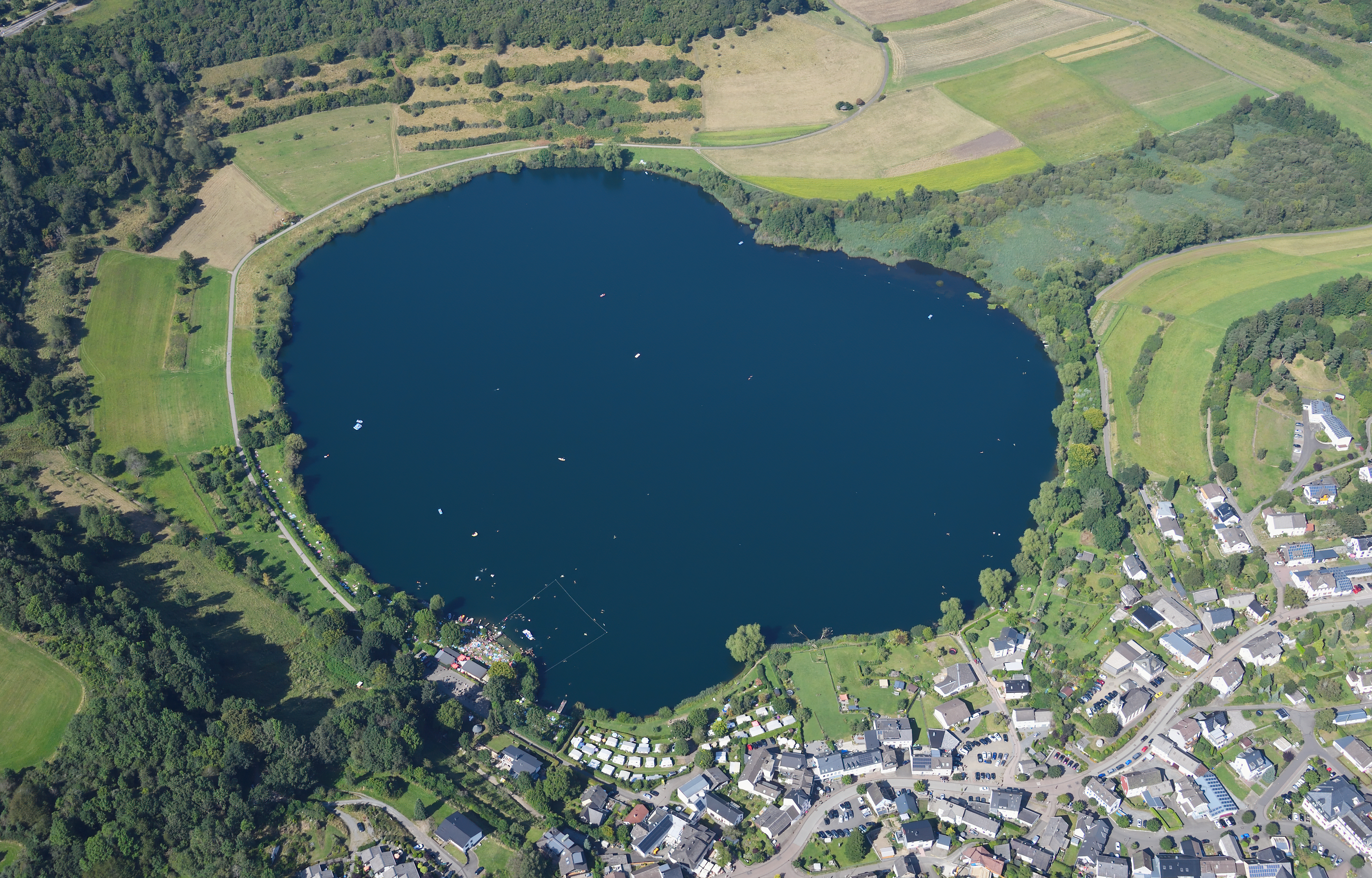
- Aerial view of Schalkenmehrener Maar, 2024

- Location within Rhineland-Palatinate
- Interactive map of Schalkenmehrener Maar
- Location: Daun, Rhineland-Palatinate
- Coordinates: 50°10′10″N 6°51′29″E
- Type: Maar
- Etymology: Schalkenmehren, Germany
- Part of: Daun Maar Group
- Basin countries: Germany
- Max. length: 554 m (1,818 ft)
- Max. width: 502 m (1,647 ft)
- Average depth: 21 m (69 ft)
- Max. depth: 90 m (300 ft)
- Surface elevation: 420 m (1,380 ft)

The Schalkenmehrener Maar is a maar roughly 3 km (1.9 mi) southeast of the town of Daun in the Eifel in the German state of Rhineland-Palatinate.

It is one of the Daun Maars (Dauner Maare) or Daun Maar Group and is a double maar, comprising a western maar lake and an eastern dry maar. Both were formed around 10,500 years ago as the result of a phreatomagmatic explosion during the Würm Ice Age. The lake in the western part of the maar varies between 552 and 502 m (1,811 and 1,647 ft) in diameter and is up to 21 m (69 ft) deep. The height of the maar above sea level is 420 m (1,380 ft) (average elevation of the water surface). It fills the more recent of the 2 maar basins. The eastern part of the maar is occupied by a raised bog.

Botanically, three different zones can be distinguished: the shore area, the raised bog and the slopes of the maar basin. In the shore area, as well as the reeds there are communities of yellow iris, white water-lily, yellow loosestrife, purple loosestrife and club-rush. The slopes of the maar basin are dominated by a mix of dry grassland and woodland edge vegetation. In addition to Breckland thyme and oregano, there is restharrow, hare's-foot clover, hop trefoil, narrow-leaved everlasting pea, musk mallow, clustered bellflower, downy hemp-nettle, fox and cubs, brown knapweed, greater knapweed, small scabious, woodruff and large communities of rosebay willow-herb. Neophytes that may be seen include garden lupins and large-flowered mountain trumpets.

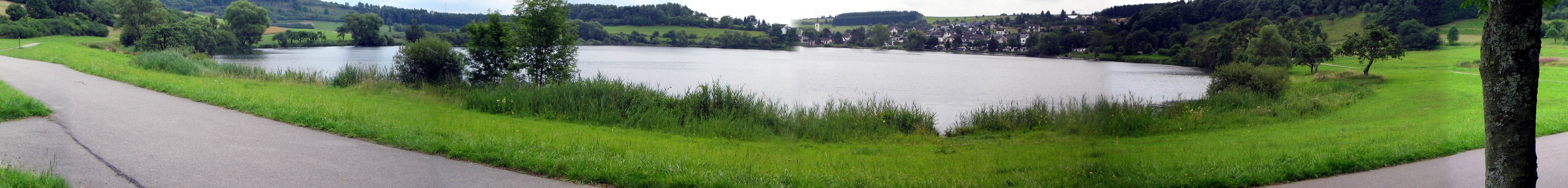
Panorama of the maar

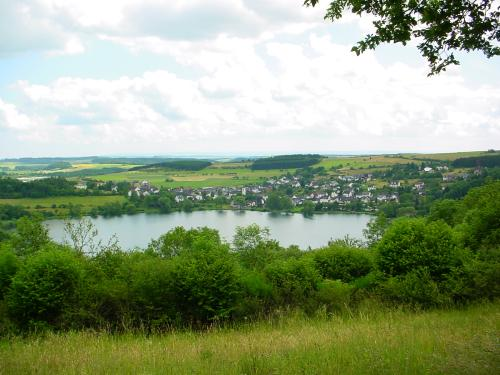
The Schalkenmehrener Maar near Daun

== See also ==
- List of lakes of Germany

== Literature ==
- Werner D’hein: Natur- und Kulturführer Vulkanlandeifel. Mit 26 Stationen der "Deutschen Vulkanstraße". Gaasterland-Verlag, Düsseldorf, 2006. ISBN 3-935873-15-8
