= Kroppach Switzerland =

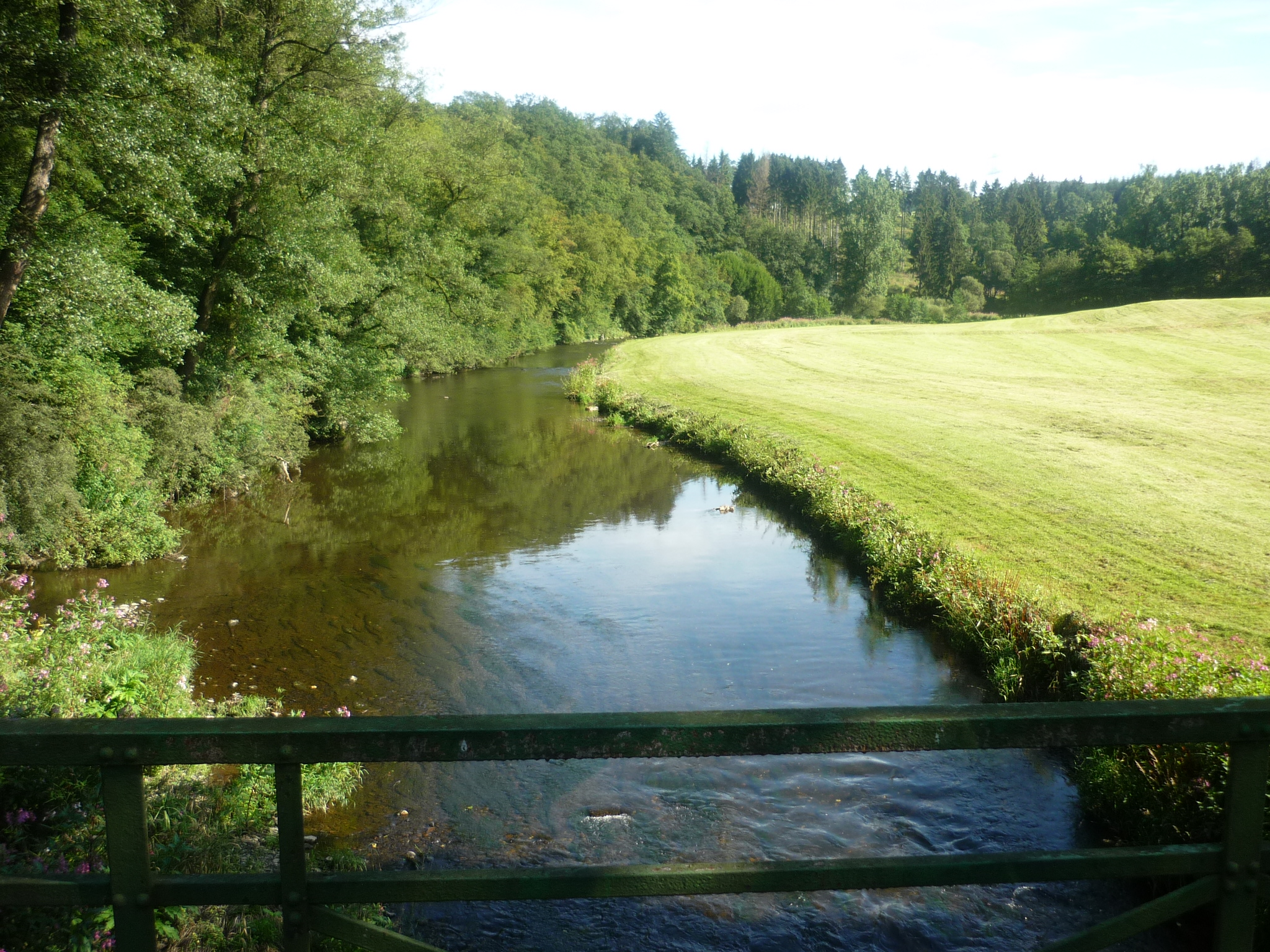
Kroppach Switzerland, the Nister between Wissen and Helmeroth

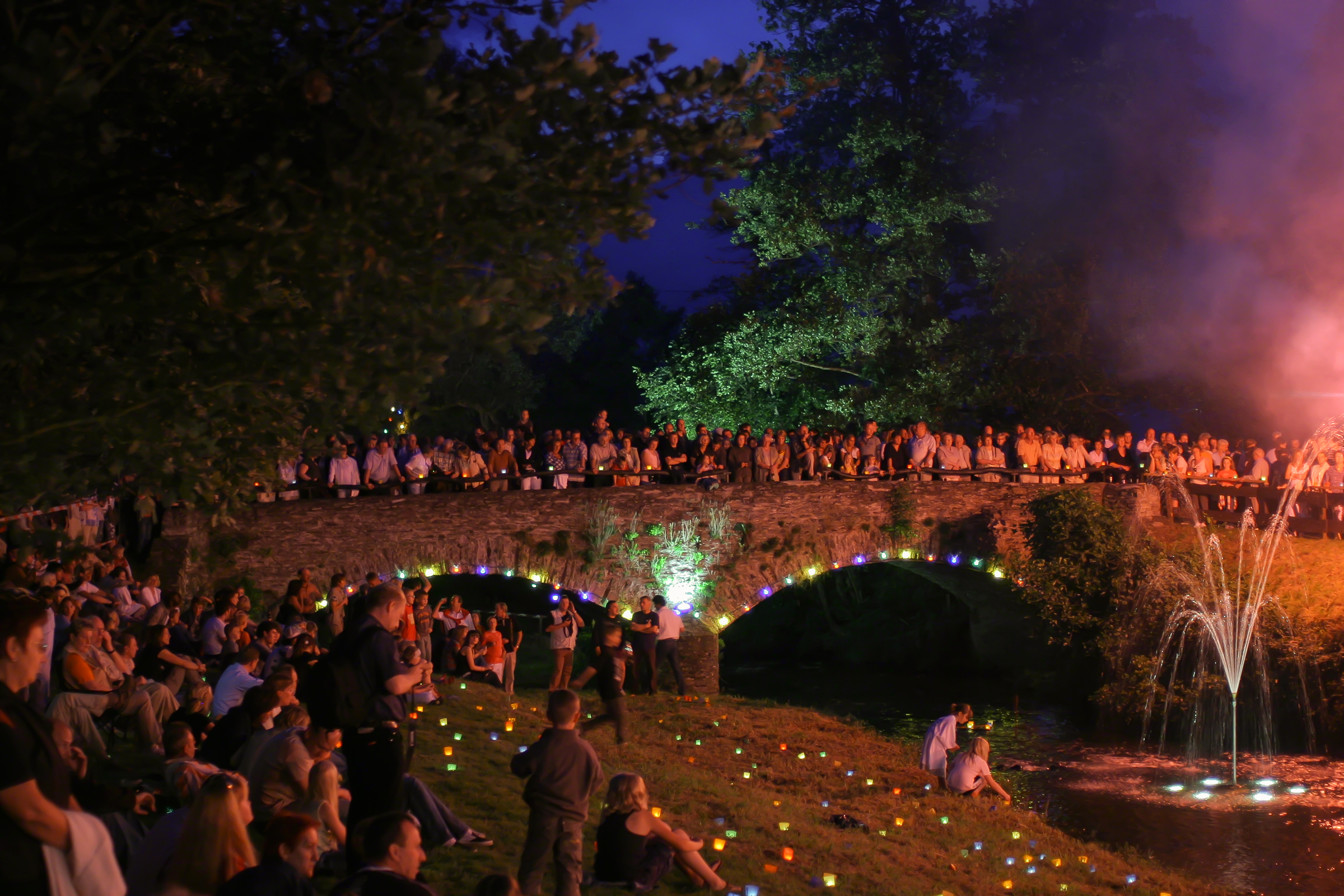
The Brückenfest in Limbach is one of the most popular events in Kroppach Switzerland

Kroppach Switzerland (German: Kroppacher Schweiz) is a region in the collective municipalities of Hachenburg, Altenkirchen-Flammersfeld and Wissen in the Rhineland-Palatinate part of the Westerwald. It lies on the lower courses of the Nister and takes the first part of its name from the village of Kroppach, which is located above the Nister valley, and the second part thanks to its characteristic rock faces.

Kroppach Switzerland is part of the natural region of the Nister Upland (Nisterbergland) and thus the Mittelsieg Uplands.

== Villages ==
The village of Astert, Limbach, Heuzert, Heimborn, Stein-Wingert, Idelberg and Helmeroth belong to Kroppach Switzerland.

== Geology ==
Geologically the region was formed by the River Nister, flowing from the High Westerwald, carving a winding course deep into the undulating countryside over thousands of years. As the river scoured downwards year by year, it left steeply cut river banks to create a striking rocky landscape.

== Region ==
Kroppach Switzerland is part of the Nister Valley (Nistertal) protected area, designated in 1969. It is crossed by numerous, waymarked footpaths along the course of the Nister. Among the best known are the Westerwaldsteig, the Marienwanderweg – an old pilgrims' way, which links the Cistercian abbey of Marienstatt with the Franciscan abbey of Marienthal - and the educational path on the so-called “End of the World (Ende der Welt) near Stein-Wingert. The main access points into Kroppach Switzerland are Hachenburg, Kroppach/station Ingelbach and Wissen.
