= Nister (disambiguation) =

Nister is an Ortsgemeinde – a community belonging to a Verbandsgemeinde – in the Westerwaldkreis in Rhineland-Palatinate, Germany.

Nister may also refer to:

- Nister (river), river in Rhineland-Palatinate, Germany
- Der Nister, Ukrainian Yiddish author, philosopher, translator, and critic
- Ernest Nister (1841–1906), German publisher and printer
