= Merkelbach =

- Municipality
- Coat of arms

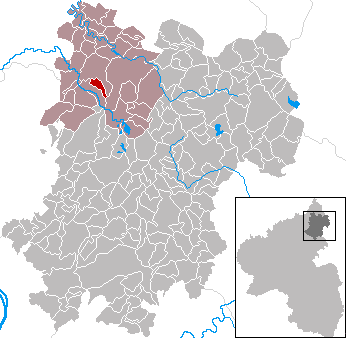
- Location of Merkelbach within Westerwaldkreis district
- Interactive map of Merkelbach
- Location within Germany Location within Rhineland-Palatinate
- Coordinates: 50°38′44″N 7°46′11″E
- Country: Germany
- State: Rhineland-Palatinate
- District: Westerwaldkreis
- Municipal assoc.: Hachenburg

Government
  - Mayor (2019–24): Edgar Schneider

Area
  - Total: 2.54 km^{2} (0.98 sq mi)
- Elevation: 355 m (1,165 ft)

Population (2025-12-31)
  - Total: 446
  - Density: 176/km^{2} (455/sq mi)
- Time zone: UTC+01:00 (CET)
  - Summer (DST): UTC+02:00 (CEST)
- Postal codes: 57629
- Dialling codes: 02662
- Vehicle registration: WW
- Website: www.merkelbach-westerwald.de

Merkelbach is an Ortsgemeinde – a community belonging to a Verbandsgemeinde – in the Westerwaldkreis in Rhineland-Palatinate, Germany.

== Geography ==
The community lies in the Westerwald between Limburg and Siegen. It belongs to the Verbandsgemeinde of Hachenburg, a kind of collective municipality. Its seat is in the like-named town.

== History ==
The first mention of Merkelbach was recorded in 1418.

== Politics ==
The municipal council is made up of 10 council members, including the extraofficial mayor (Bürgermeister), who were elected in a majority vote in a municipal election on 13 June 2004.

== Economy and infrastructure ==
The community lies right on Bundesstraße 413, leading from Bendorf (near Koblenz) to Hachenburg. The nearest Autobahn interchanges are in Dierdorf and Neuwied on the A 3 (Cologne–Frankfurt). The nearest InterCityExpress stop is the railway station at Montabaur on the Cologne-Frankfurt high-speed rail line. The community is linked by bus connections every two hours to Hachenburg and the InterCityExpress station at Montabaur.
