= Marzhausen =

- Municipality
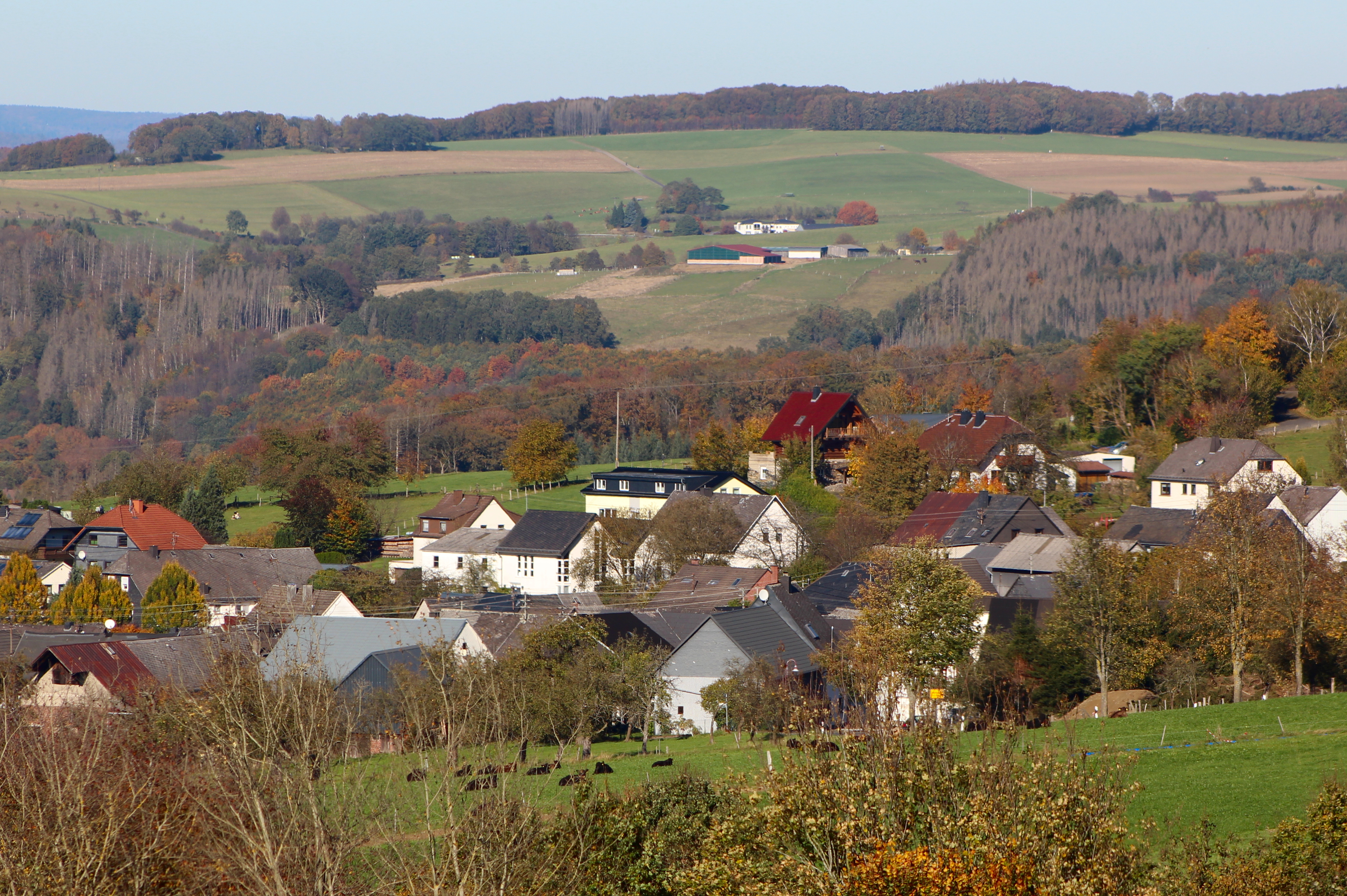

- Coat of arms

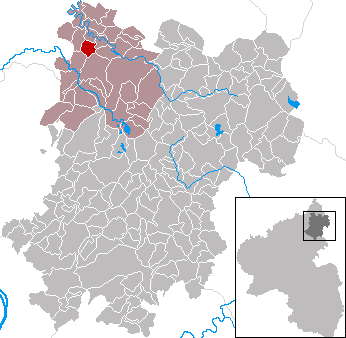
- Location of Marzhausen within Westerwaldkreis district
- Interactive map of Marzhausen
- Location within Germany Location within Rhineland-Palatinate
- Coordinates: 50°41′28″N 7°45′21″E
- Country: Germany
- State: Rhineland-Palatinate
- District: Westerwaldkreis
- Municipal assoc.: Hachenburg

Government
  - Mayor (2019–24): Gregor Brings

Area
  - Total: 3.03 km^{2} (1.17 sq mi)
- Elevation: 300 m (980 ft)

Population (2025-12-31)
  - Total: 256
  - Density: 84.5/km^{2} (219/sq mi)
- Time zone: UTC+01:00 (CET)
  - Summer (DST): UTC+02:00 (CEST)
- Postal codes: 57627
- Dialling codes: 02688
- Vehicle registration: WW
- Website: www.hachenburg-vg.de

Marzhausen is an Ortsgemeinde – a community belonging to a Verbandsgemeinde – in the Westerwaldkreis in Rhineland-Palatinate, Germany. The community, first documented in 1346, lies between Hachenburg and Altenkirchen on the edge of the Kroppach Switzerland (Kroppacher Schweiz) and is characterized by agriculture. Marzhausen belongs to the Verbandsgemeinde of Hachenburg, a kind of collective municipality, governed by a community council of 7 council members, including the extraofficial mayor (Bürgermeister), who are elected.

Marzhausen is linked to the long-distance highway network through Bundesstraße 414. The Autobahn interchanges Mogendorf and Dierdorf on the A 3 (Cologne–Frankfurt) can me reached over Bundesstraßen 8 and 413.
