= Mudenbach =

- Municipality
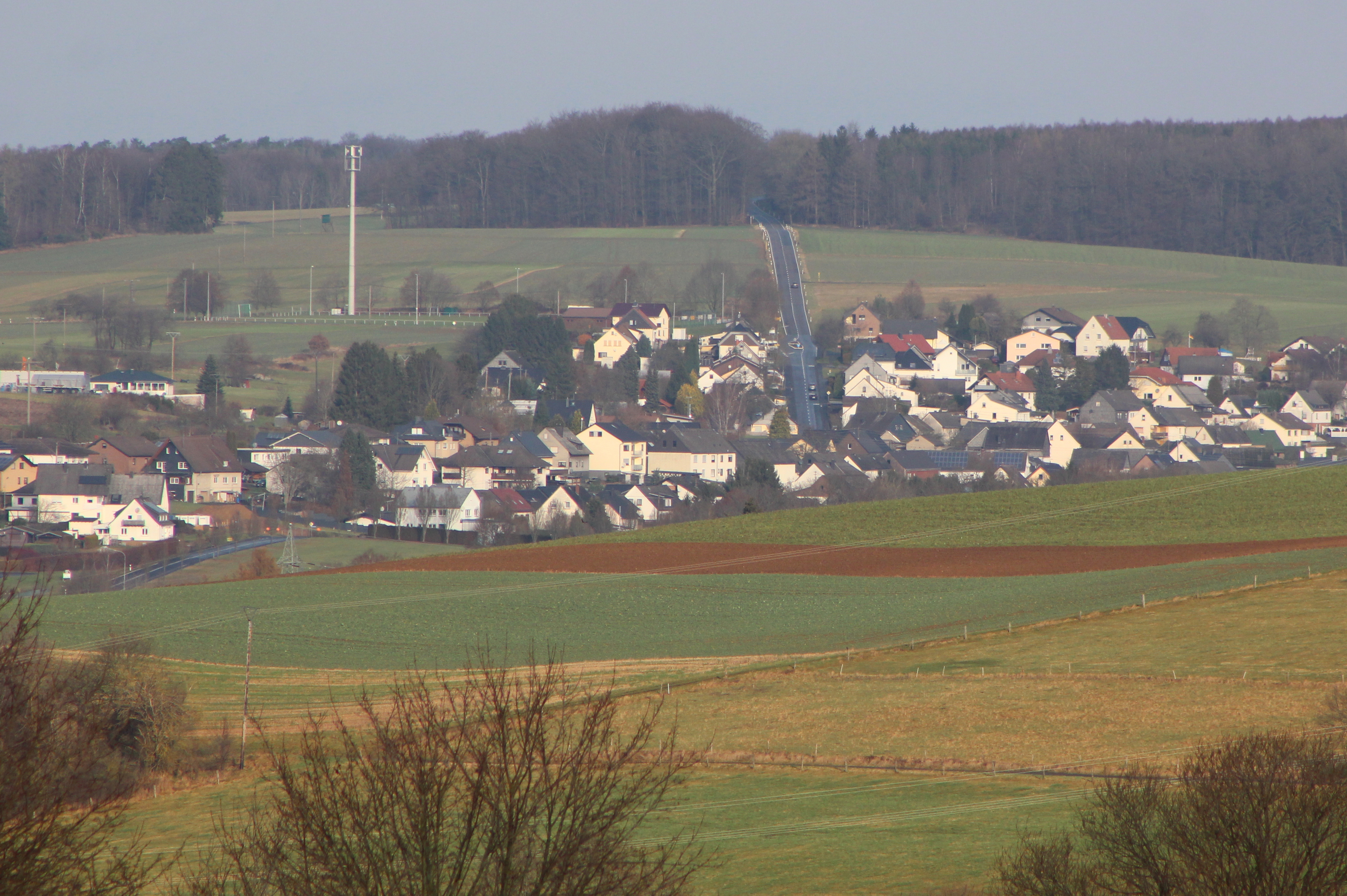

- Coat of arms

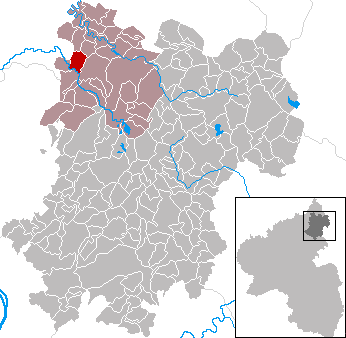
- Location of Mudenbach within Westerwaldkreis district
- Interactive map of Mudenbach
- Location within Germany Location within Rhineland-Palatinate
- Coordinates: 50°40′4″N 7°44′7″E
- Country: Germany
- State: Rhineland-Palatinate
- District: Westerwaldkreis
- Municipal assoc.: Hachenburg

Government
  - Mayor (2019–24): Christa Hülpüsch

Area
  - Total: 4.78 km^{2} (1.85 sq mi)
- Elevation: 295 m (968 ft)

Population (2025-12-31)
  - Total: 763
  - Density: 160/km^{2} (413/sq mi)
- Time zone: UTC+01:00 (CET)
  - Summer (DST): UTC+02:00 (CEST)
- Postal codes: 57614
- Dialling codes: 02688
- Vehicle registration: WW
- Website: mudenbach.de

Mudenbach is an Ortsgemeinde – a community belonging to a Verbandsgemeinde – in the Westerwaldkreis in Rhineland-Palatinate, Germany.

== Geography ==
=== Location ===
The community lies in the northern Westerwald on the river Wied. The community is mainly agriculturally structured. It belongs to the Verbandsgemeinde of Hachenburg, a kind of collective municipality. Its seat is in the like-named town.

=== Constituent communities ===
Mudenbach has one outlying centre named Hanwerth.

== History ==
In 1270, Mudenbach had its first documentary mention.

== Politics ==
The municipal council is made up of 13 council members, including the extraofficial mayor (Bürgermeister), who were elected in a majority vote in a municipal election on 13 June 2004.

== Economy and infrastructure ==
Mudenbach is linked to the long-distance transport network by Landesstraße 265 leading to Bundesstraße 8, which links the community to the middle centres of Hachenburg and Altenkirchen. The Autobahn interchanges Mogendorf and Dierdorf on the A 3 (Cologne–Frankfurt) can be reached by Bundesstraßen 8 and 413. The Hennef interchange on the A 5 (AS 60) can be reached directly by Bundesstraße 8.
