= Mörsbach =

- Municipality
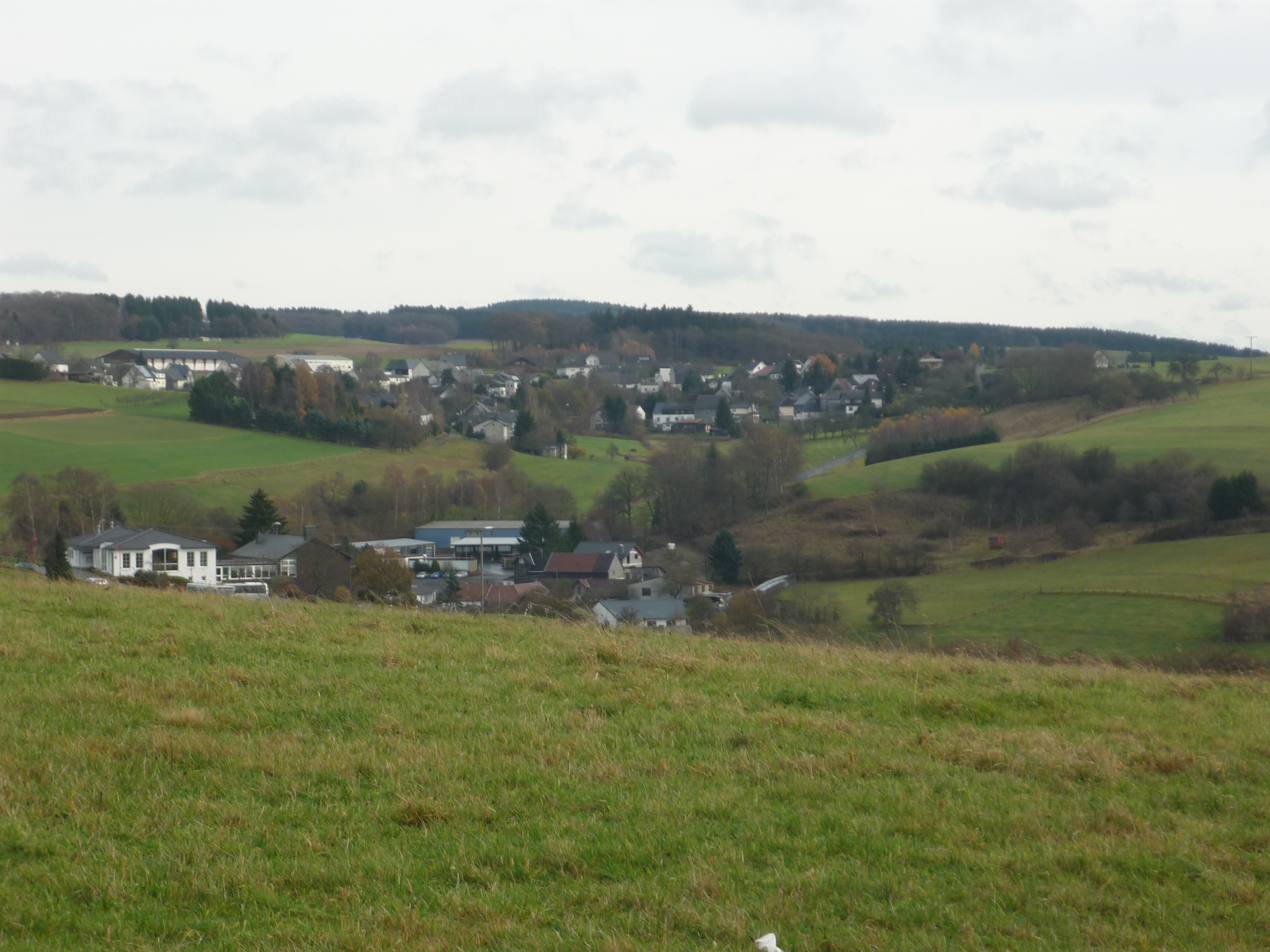
- Niedermörsbach

- Coat of arms

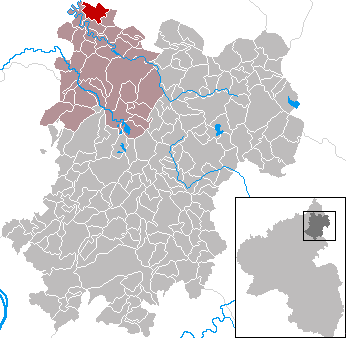
- Location of Mörsbach within Westerwaldkreis district
- Interactive map of Mörsbach
- Location within Germany Location within Rhineland-Palatinate
- Coordinates: 50°43′36″N 7°47′0″E
- Country: Germany
- State: Rhineland-Palatinate
- District: Westerwaldkreis
- Municipal assoc.: Hachenburg
- Subdivisions: 4

Government
  - Mayor (2019–24): Egon Müller

Area
  - Total: 5.92 km^{2} (2.29 sq mi)
- Elevation: 340 m (1,120 ft)

Population (2025-12-31)
  - Total: 402
  - Density: 67.9/km^{2} (176/sq mi)
- Time zone: UTC+01:00 (CET)
  - Summer (DST): UTC+02:00 (CEST)
- Postal codes: 57629
- Dialling codes: 02688
- Vehicle registration: WW
- Website: www.hachenburg-vg.de

Mörsbach is an Ortsgemeinde – a community belonging to a Verbandsgemeinde – in the Westerwaldkreis in Rhineland-Palatinate, Germany.

== Geography ==
=== Location ===
The community lies in the Westerwald between Limburg and Siegen in the nature and landscape conservation area of the Kroppach Switzerland (Kroppacher Schweiz). It belongs to the Verbandsgemeinde of Hachenburg, a kind of collective municipality. Its seat is in the like-named town. Another Mörsbach is Part of the Town Zweibrücken in Rheinland-Pfalz near the Border to Saarland with about 1000 Citizen

=== Constituent communities ===
Mörsbach's Ortsteile are Obermörsbach, Niedermörsbach, Wintershof and Burbach.

== History ==
In 1335, Mörsbach had its first documentary mention as Mersbach.

== Politics ==
The municipal council is made up of 9 council members, including the extraofficial mayor (Bürgermeister), who were elected in a majority vote in a municipal election on 13 June 2004.

== Economy and infrastructure ==
South of the community runs Bundesstraße 414, leading from Hohenroth to Hachenburg. The nearest Autobahn interchanges are Siegen, Wilnsdorf and Herborn on the A 45 (Dortmund–Gießen). The nearest InterCityExpress stop is the railway station at Montabaur on the Cologne-Frankfurt high-speed rail line.
