= Welkenbach =

- Municipality
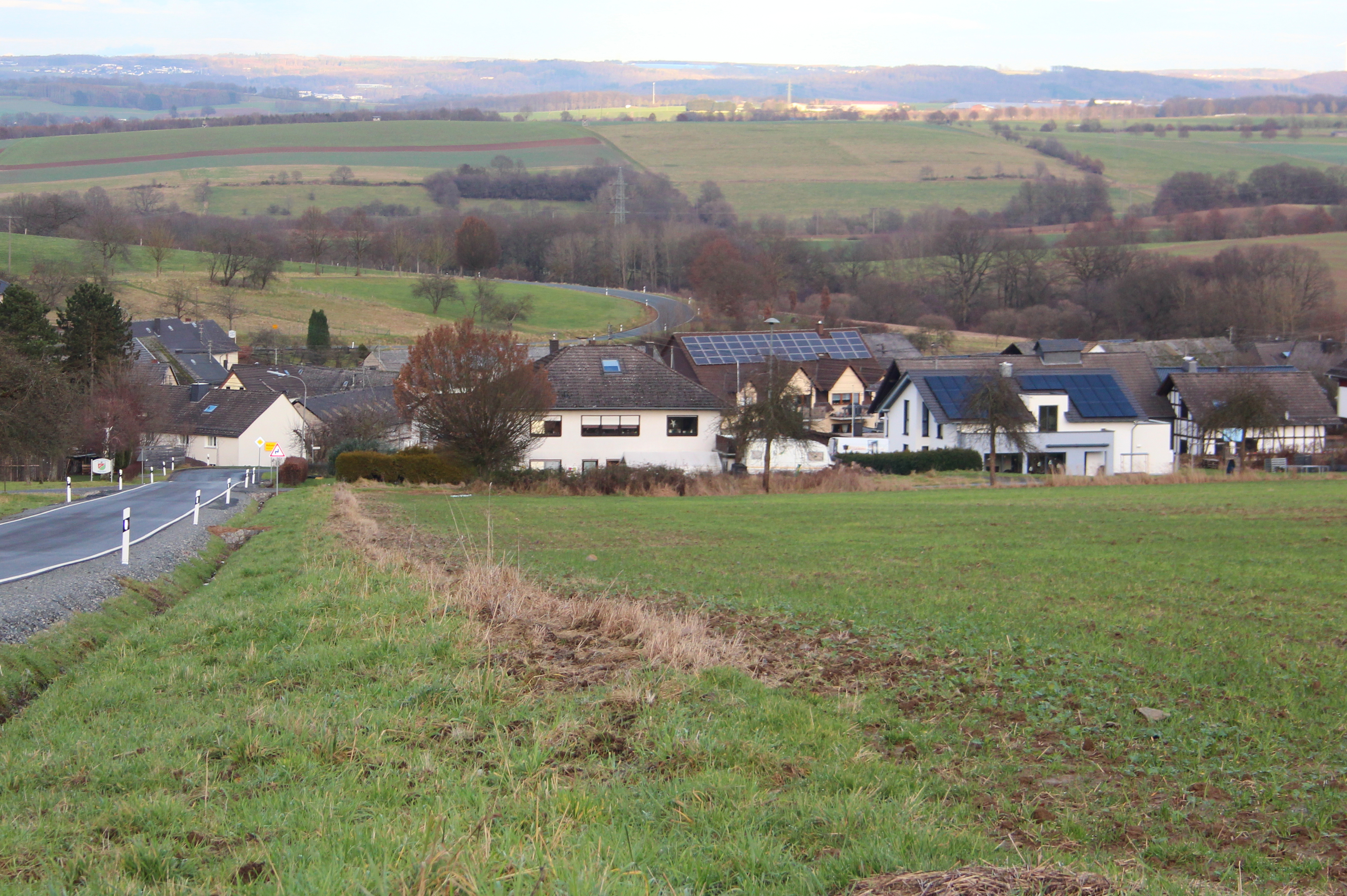

- Coat of arms

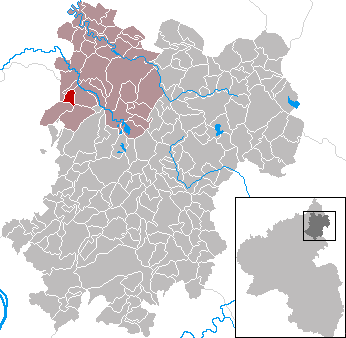
- Location of Welkenbach within Westerwaldkreis district
- Interactive map of Welkenbach
- Location within Germany Location within Rhineland-Palatinate
- Coordinates: 50°38′0″N 7°43′35″E
- Country: Germany
- State: Rhineland-Palatinate
- District: Westerwaldkreis
- Municipal assoc.: Hachenburg

Government
  - Mayor (2019–24): Matthias Becker

Area
  - Total: 2.30 km^{2} (0.89 sq mi)
- Elevation: 315 m (1,033 ft)

Population (2025-12-31)
  - Total: 157
  - Density: 68.3/km^{2} (177/sq mi)
- Time zone: UTC+01:00 (CET)
  - Summer (DST): UTC+02:00 (CEST)
- Postal codes: 57644
- Dialling codes: 02680
- Vehicle registration: WW
- Website: www.hachenburg-vg.de

Welkenbach is an Ortsgemeinde – a community belonging to a Verbandsgemeinde – in the Westerwaldkreis in Rhineland-Palatinate, Germany.

== Geography ==
The community lies in the Westerwald between Limburg an der Lahn and Siegen. Verbandsgemeinde of Hachenburg, a kind of collective municipality. Its seat is in the like-named town.

== History ==
In 1315, Welkenbach had its first documentary mention as Welkemerode.

== Politics ==
The municipal council is made up of 7 council members, including the extraofficial mayor (Bürgermeister), who were elected in a majority vote in a municipal election on 13 June 2004.

== Economy and infrastructure ==
Welkenbach is served by the local bus lines 415 and 417. The community lies west of Bundesstraße 8, leading from Limburg an der Lahn nach Siegburg. The nearest Autobahn interchanges are in Dierdorf and Neuwied on the A 3 (Cologne–Frankfurt). The nearest InterCityExpress stop is the railway station at Montabaur on the Cologne-Frankfurt high-speed rail line.
