= Heuzert =

- Municipality
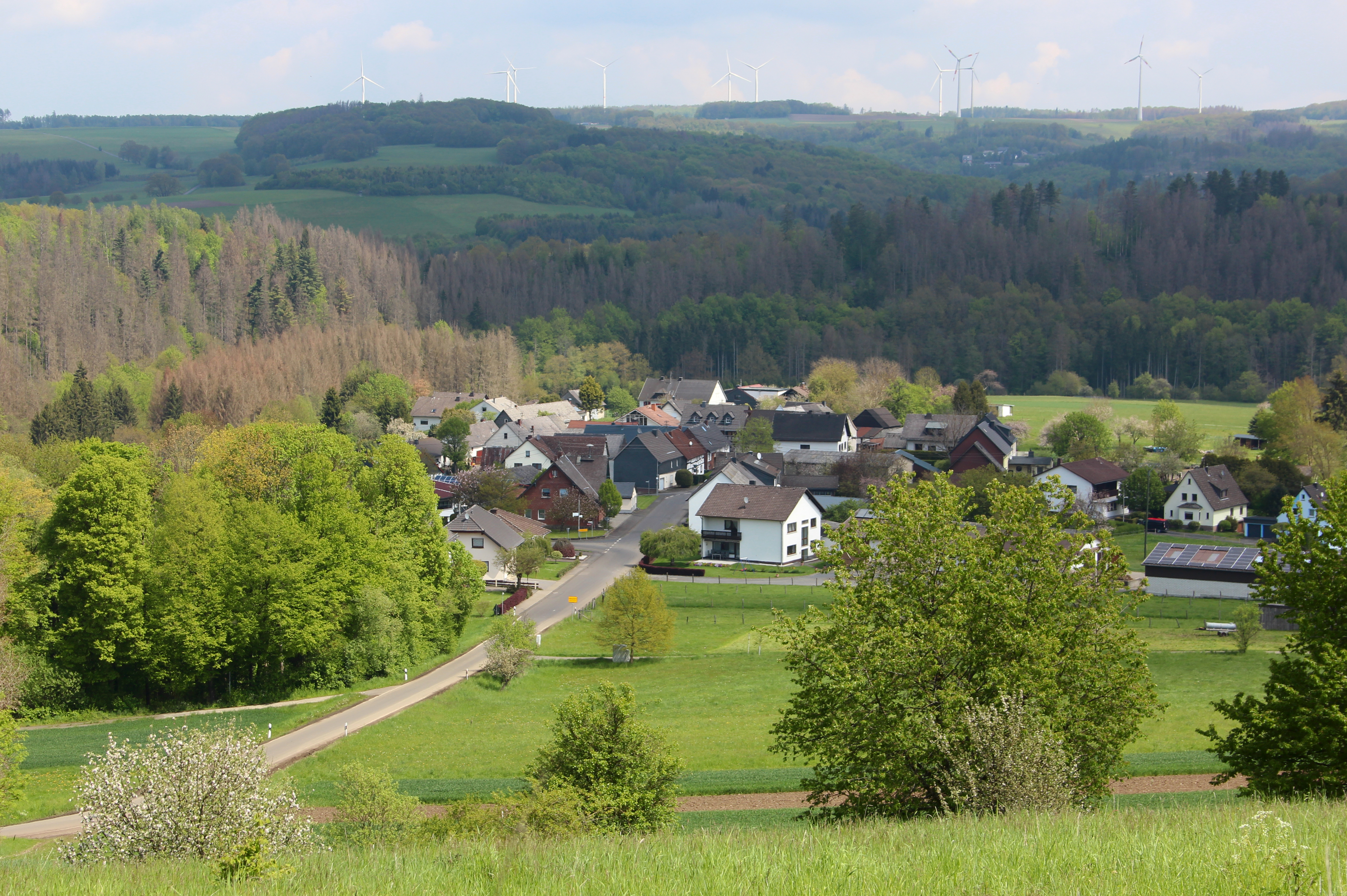

- Coat of arms

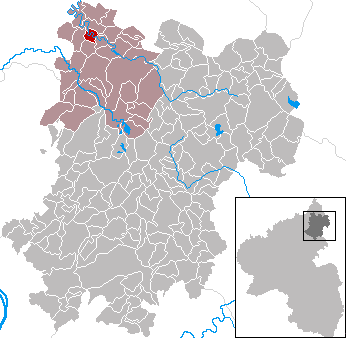
- Location of Heuzert within Westerwaldkreis district
- Interactive map of Heuzert
- Location within Germany Location within Rhineland-Palatinate
- Coordinates: 50°42′04″N 7°45′30″E
- Country: Germany
- State: Rhineland-Palatinate
- District: Westerwaldkreis
- Municipal assoc.: Hachenburg

Government
  - Mayor (2019–24): Manfred Schneider

Area
  - Total: 2.13 km^{2} (0.82 sq mi)
- Elevation: 230 m (750 ft)

Population (2025-12-31)
  - Total: 121
  - Density: 56.8/km^{2} (147/sq mi)
- Time zone: UTC+01:00 (CET)
  - Summer (DST): UTC+02:00 (CEST)
- Postal codes: 57627
- Dialling codes: 02688
- Vehicle registration: WW
- Website: www.hachenburg-vg.de/08_gemeinden/heuzert

Heuzert is an Ortsgemeinde – a community belonging to a Verbandsgemeinde – in the Westerwaldkreis in Rhineland-Palatinate, Germany. The agriculturally structured residential community of Heuzert to the Verbandsgemeinde of Hachenburg, a kind of collective municipality. Its seat is in the like-named town.

== Geography ==
The community lies in the Westerwald between Limburg and Siegen, on the river Nister in the nature and landscape conservation area of the Kroppach Switzerland.

== History ==
In 1286, Heuzert had its first documentary mention as Hutcenrothe.

== Politics ==
The municipal council is made up of 6 council members who were elected in a majority vote in a municipal election on 7 June 2009.

== Economy and infrastructure ==
Heuzert has access to the public transport through the local bus line 410 (Hachenburg - Wissen) and is located in the area of the transport association Verkehrsverbund Rhein-Mosel (VRM), in the fare zone number 452. South of the community runs Bundesstraße 414, leading from Hohenroth to Hachenburg. The nearest Autobahn interchanges are in Siegen, Wilnsdorf and Herborn on the A 45 (Dortmund–Gießen). The nearest railway stop is Hattert at the Limburg-Altenkirchen railway, nearest InterCityExpress stop is Montabaur (Cologne-Frankfurt high-speed rail line). Heuzert is located at the Marienwanderweg, a walking path leading from Marienstatt Abbey in Streithausen to Marienthal Abbey (Westerwald).
