= Heimborn =

- Municipality
- Coat of arms

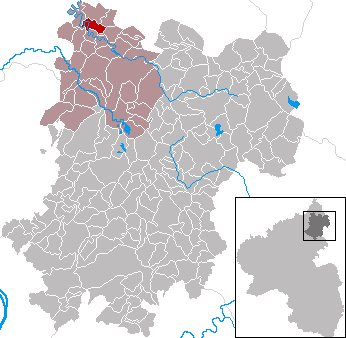
- Location of Heimborn within Westerwaldkreis district
- Interactive map of Heimborn
- Location within Germany Location within Rhineland-Palatinate
- Coordinates: 50°42′46″N 7°45′19″E
- Country: Germany
- State: Rhineland-Palatinate
- District: Westerwaldkreis
- Municipal assoc.: Hachenburg
- Subdivisions: 3

Government
  - Mayor (2019–24): Katja Krüger

Area
  - Total: 3.74 km^{2} (1.44 sq mi)
- Elevation: 220 m (720 ft)

Population (2025-12-31)
  - Total: 282
  - Density: 75.4/km^{2} (195/sq mi)
- Time zone: UTC+01:00 (CET)
  - Summer (DST): UTC+02:00 (CEST)
- Postal codes: 57629
- Dialling codes: 02688
- Vehicle registration: WW
- Website: www.hachenburg-vg.de

Heimborn is an Ortsgemeinde – a community belonging to a Verbandsgemeinde – in the Westerwaldkreis in Rhineland-Palatinate, Germany. The agriculturally structured residential community belongs to the Verbandsgemeinde of Hachenburg, a kind of collective municipality. Its seat is in the like-named town.

== Geography ==
=== Location ===
The community lies in the Westerwald between Limburg and Siegen, at the forks of the Nister in the middle of the Kroppach Switzerland.

=== Constituent communities ===
Heimborn's Ortsteile are Heimborn and Ehrlich.

== History ==
In 1346, Heimborn had its first documentary mention.

== Politics ==
The municipal council is made up of 6 council members who were elected in a majority vote in a municipal election on 7 June 2009.

== Economy and infrastructure ==
Heimborn is located in the area of the transport association Verkehrsverbund Rhein-Mosel (VRM), zone number 452 and connected to the public transport through the bus line 410 (Hachenburg - Wissen). South of the community runs Bundesstraße 414, leading from Hohenroth to Hachenburg. The nearest Autobahn interchanges are Siegen, Wilnsdorf and Herborn on the A 45 (Dortmund–Gießen), some 25 km away. The nearest InterCityExpress stop is the railway station at Montabaur on the Cologne-Frankfurt high-speed rail line. Heimborn is located at the Marienwanderweg, a walking path leading from Marienstatt Abbey in Streithausen to Marienthal Abbey (Westerwald).
