= Winkelbach =

- Municipality
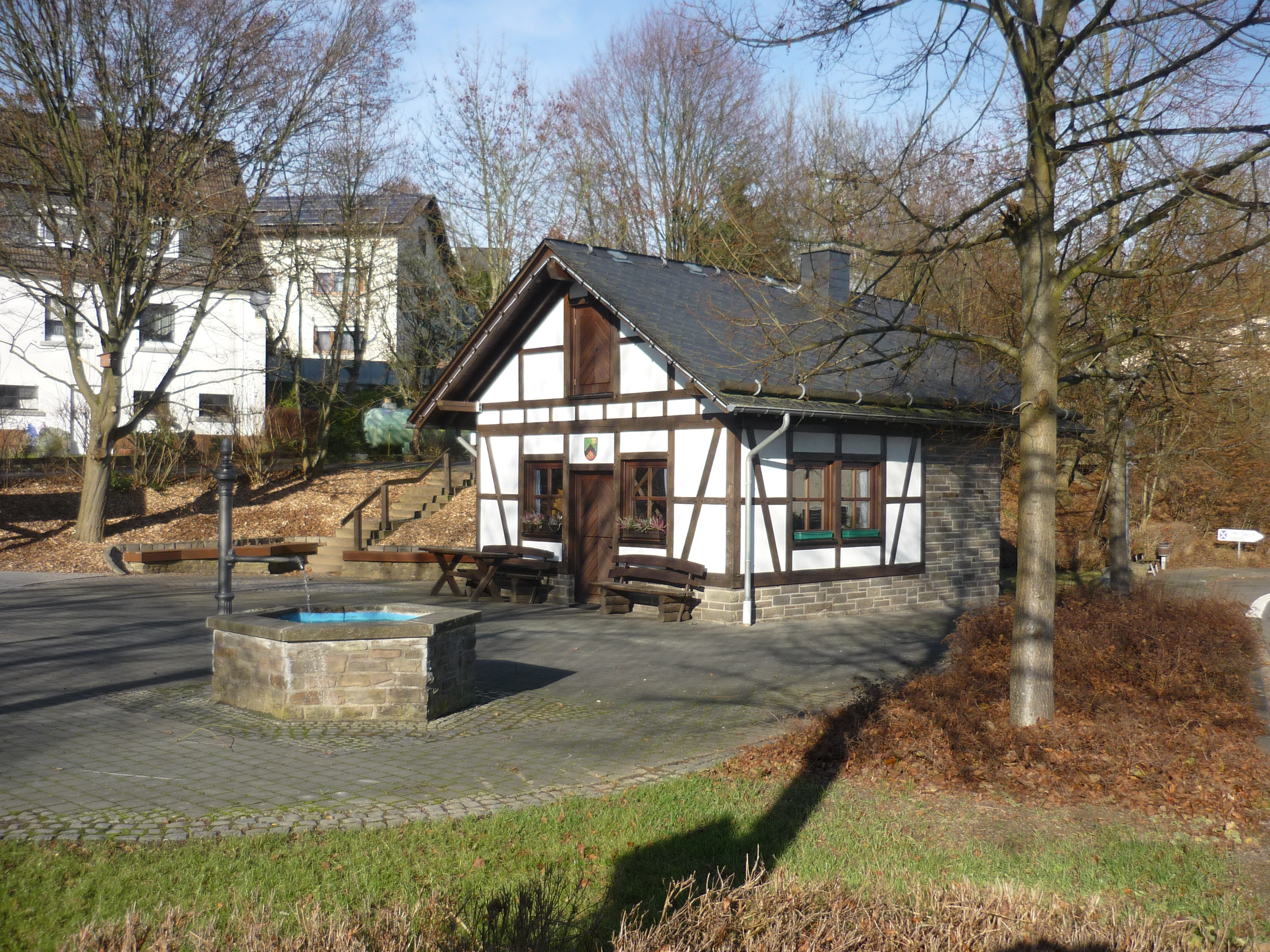

- Coat of arms

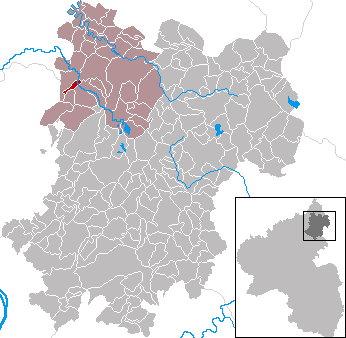
- Location of Winkelbach within Westerwaldkreis district
- Interactive map of Winkelbach
- Location within Germany Location within Rhineland-Palatinate
- Coordinates: 50°39′N 7°44′E
- Country: Germany
- State: Rhineland-Palatinate
- District: Westerwaldkreis
- Municipal assoc.: Hachenburg

Government
  - Mayor (2019–24): Eckhard Biehl

Area
  - Total: 1.34 km^{2} (0.52 sq mi)
- Elevation: 302 m (991 ft)

Population (2025-12-31)
  - Total: 234
  - Density: 175/km^{2} (452/sq mi)
- Time zone: UTC+01:00 (CET)
  - Summer (DST): UTC+02:00 (CEST)
- Postal codes: 57644
- Dialling codes: 02680
- Vehicle registration: WW
- Website: www.hachenburg-vg.de

Winkelbach is an Ortsgemeinde – a community belonging to a Verbandsgemeinde – in the Westerwaldkreis in Rhineland-Palatinate, Germany.

== Geography ==
The community lies in the Westerwald between Limburg and Siegen in the upper Wied valley. Through the community flows the Wied. Winkelbach belongs to the Verbandsgemeinde of Hachenburg, a kind of collective municipality. Its seat is in the like-named town.

== History ==
In 1262, Winkelbach had its first documentary mention.

== Politics ==
The municipal council is made up of 9 council members, including the honorary mayor (Bürgermeister), who were elected in a majority vote in a municipal election on 13 June 2004.

== Economy and infrastructure ==
The local bus lines 408, 415, 417 and 255 connect Winkelbach to the public transport.

Running right through the community is Bundesstraße 8, which leads from Limburg an der Lahn to Siegburg. The nearest Autobahn interchanges are in Dierdorf and Neuwied on the A 3 (Cologne–Frankfurt), some 25 km away.

Winkelbach was connected to the public rail transport though a station on the Selters-Hachenburg narrow gauge railway, which already has been closed and deconstructed.

The nearest InterCityExpress stop is the railway station at Montabaur on the Cologne-Frankfurt high-speed rail line.
