= Wahlrod =

- Municipality
- Coat of arms

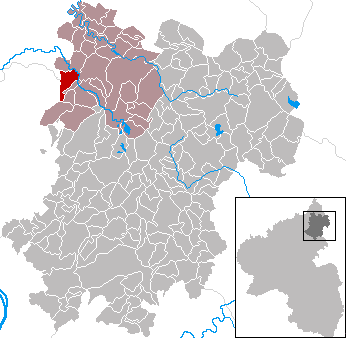
- Location of Wahlrod within Westerwaldkreis district
- Interactive map of Wahlrod
- Location within Germany Location within Rhineland-Palatinate
- Coordinates: 50°39′1″N 7°43′13″E
- Country: Germany
- State: Rhineland-Palatinate
- District: Westerwaldkreis
- Municipal assoc.: Hachenburg

Government
  - Mayor (2019–24): Sandra Dörner

Area
  - Total: 5.99 km^{2} (2.31 sq mi)
- Elevation: 290 m (950 ft)

Population (2025-12-31)
  - Total: 913
  - Density: 152/km^{2} (395/sq mi)
- Time zone: UTC+01:00 (CET)
  - Summer (DST): UTC+02:00 (CEST)
- Postal codes: 57614
- Dialling codes: 02680
- Vehicle registration: WW
- Website: www.wahlrod.de

Wahlrod is an Ortsgemeinde – a community belonging to a Verbandsgemeinde – in the Westerwaldkreis in Rhineland-Palatinate, Germany.

== Geography ==
The community lies in the northern Westerwaldkreis and borders on Altenkirchen district. Wahlrod belongs to the Verbandsgemeinde of Hachenburg, a kind of collective municipality. Its seat is in the like-named town.

== History ==
In 1249, Wahlrod had its first documentary mention.

== Politics ==
The municipal council is made up of 13 council members, including the honorary mayor (Bürgermeister), who were elected in a majority vote in a municipal election on 13 June 2004.

== Economy and infrastructure ==
=== Transport ===
Wahlrod is served by the local bus lines 123, 124, 255, 408 and 413.

Running right through the community is Bundesstraße 8, leading from Limburg an der Lahn to Siegburg. The nearest Autobahn interchanges are in Dierdorf and Neuwied on the A 3 (Cologne–Frankfurt), some 25 km away.

There was a station of the Selters-Hachenburg narrow gauge railway in Wahlrod, but the line has been closed and the former tracks almost all have been removed.

The nearest InterCityExpress stop is the railway station at Montabaur on the Cologne-Frankfurt high-speed rail line.
