= Roßbach, Westerwaldkreis =

Roßbach
- Municipality
- Interactive map of Roßbach
- Location within Germany Location within Rhineland-Palatinate
- Coordinates: 50°36′21″N 7°41′0″E
- Country: Germany
- State: Rhineland-Palatinate
- District: Westerwaldkreis
- Municipal assoc.: Hachenburg

Government
  - Mayor (2019–24): Wilfried Oettgen

Area
  - Total: 7.48 km^{2} (2.89 sq mi)
- Elevation: 300 m (980 ft)

Population (2025-12-31)
  - Total: 874
  - Density: 117/km^{2} (303/sq mi)
- Time zone: UTC+01:00 (CET)
  - Summer (DST): UTC+02:00 (CEST)
- Postal codes: 56271
- Dialling codes: 02680
- Vehicle registration: WW
- Website: www.rossbach-ww.de

Roßbach (German pronunciation: [ˈʁoːsˌbax]) is an Ortsgemeinde – a community belonging to a Verbandsgemeinde – in the Westerwaldkreis in Rhineland-Palatinate, Germany.

== Geography ==
The community lies between Hachenburg and Dierdorf. The residential community of Roßbach belongs to the Verbandsgemeinde of Hachenburg, a kind of collective municipality. Its seat is in the like-named town.

== Politics ==
The municipal council is made up of 13 council members, including the extraofficial mayor (Bürgermeister), who were elected in a municipal election on 13 June 2004.

	SPD	CDU	Wählergemeinschaft	Total
2004	5	3	4	12 seats

== Economy and infrastructure ==
Roßbach lies west of Bundesstraße 413 from Bendorf (near Koblenz) to Hachenburg. The nearest Autobahn interchanges are in Dierdorf on the A 3 (Cologne–Frankfurt). The nearest InterCityExpress stop is the railway station at Montabaur on the Cologne-Frankfurt high-speed rail line.
