= Kundert =

- Municipality
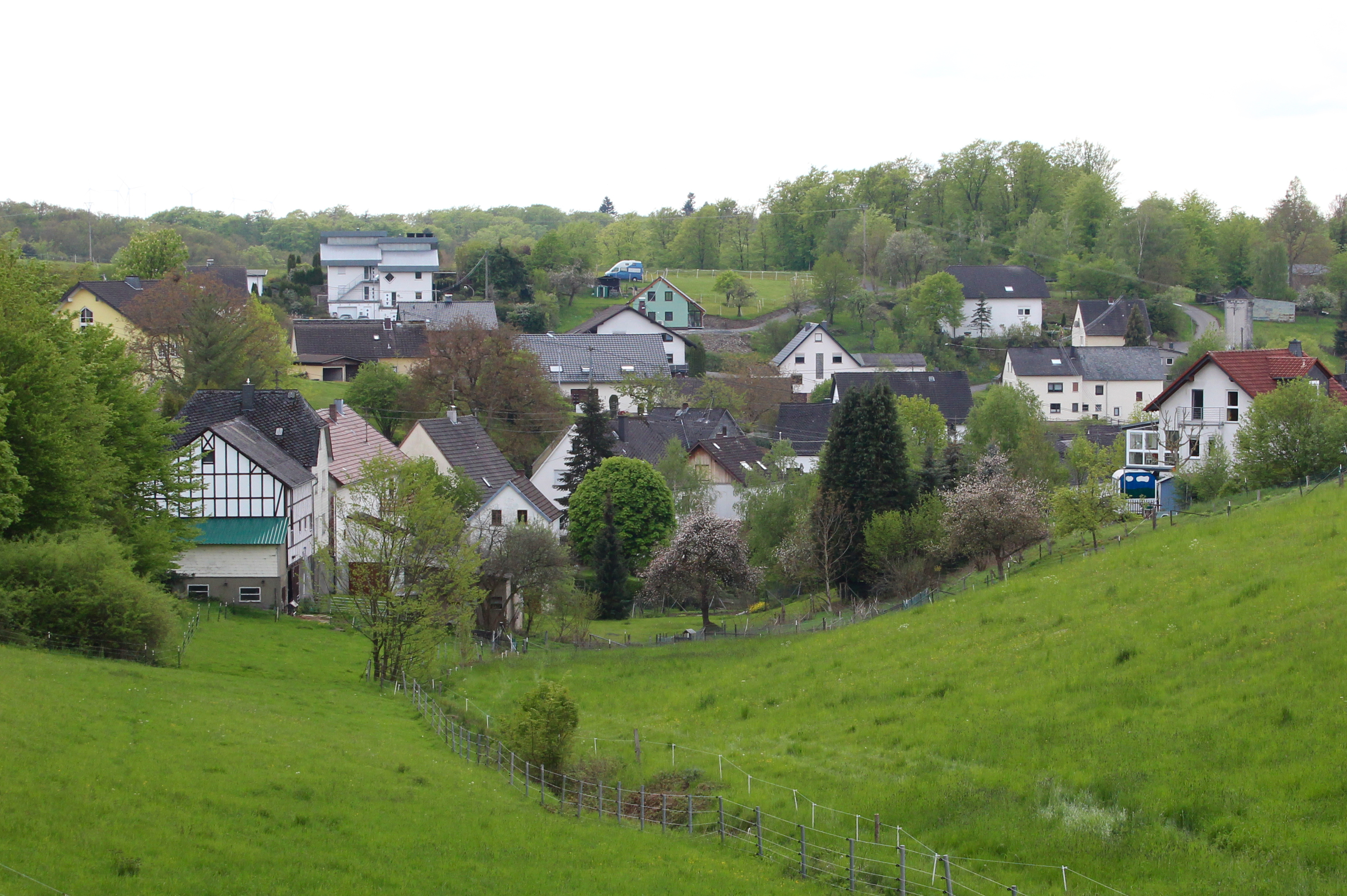

- Coat of arms

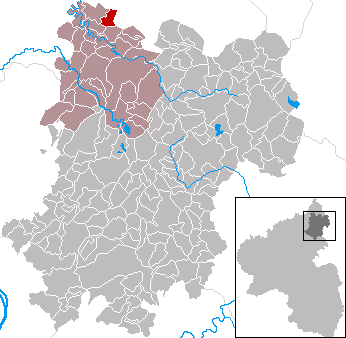
- Location of Kundert within Westerwaldkreis district
- Interactive map of Kundert
- Location within Germany Location within Rhineland-Palatinate
- Coordinates: 50°43′07″N 7°47′31″E
- Country: Germany
- State: Rhineland-Palatinate
- District: Westerwaldkreis
- Municipal assoc.: Hachenburg

Government
  - Mayor (2019–24): Burkhard Schneider

Area
  - Total: 3.14 km^{2} (1.21 sq mi)
- Elevation: 300 m (980 ft)

Population (2025-12-31)
  - Total: 280
  - Density: 89/km^{2} (230/sq mi)
- Time zone: UTC+01:00 (CET)
  - Summer (DST): UTC+02:00 (CEST)
- Postal codes: 57629
- Dialling codes: 02662
- Vehicle registration: WW
- Website: www.hachenburg-vg.de/08_gemeinden/kundert

Kundert is an Ortsgemeinde – a community belonging to a Verbandsgemeinde – in the Westerwaldkreis in Rhineland-Palatinate, Germany. The residential community of Kundert belongs to the Verbandsgemeinde of Hachenburg, a kind of collective municipality. Its seat is in the like-named town.

== Geography ==
The community lies in the Westerwald between Limburg and Siegen, in the Kroppach Switzerland nature and landscape conservation area.

== History ==
In 1346, Kundert had its first documentary mention under the name Kunderoed. Kundert was once an agriculturally oriented village, but nowadays is more a residential community.

== Politics ==
The municipal council is made up of 6 council members who were elected in a majority vote in a municipal election on 13 June 2004.

== Economy and infrastructure ==
=== Transport ===
South of the community runs Bundesstraße 414, leading from Hohenroth to Hachenburg. The nearest Autobahn interchanges are in Freudenberg, Siegen, Wilnsdorf and Herborn on the A 45 (Dortmund–Gießen). The nearest InterCityExpress stop is the railway station at Montabaur on the Cologne-Frankfurt high-speed rail line.

=== Public institutions ===
The community has at its disposal a public football ground and playground, a well-developed hiking path network, its own barbecue pavilion and two timber-frame houses of the Kinderkrebshilfe Unnau (“Unnau Children’s Cancer Help”). There is also a community bakehouse in Kundert with a long baking tradition. Furthermore, there is a mixed choir that contributes considerably to community life.
