= Giesenhausen =

- Municipality
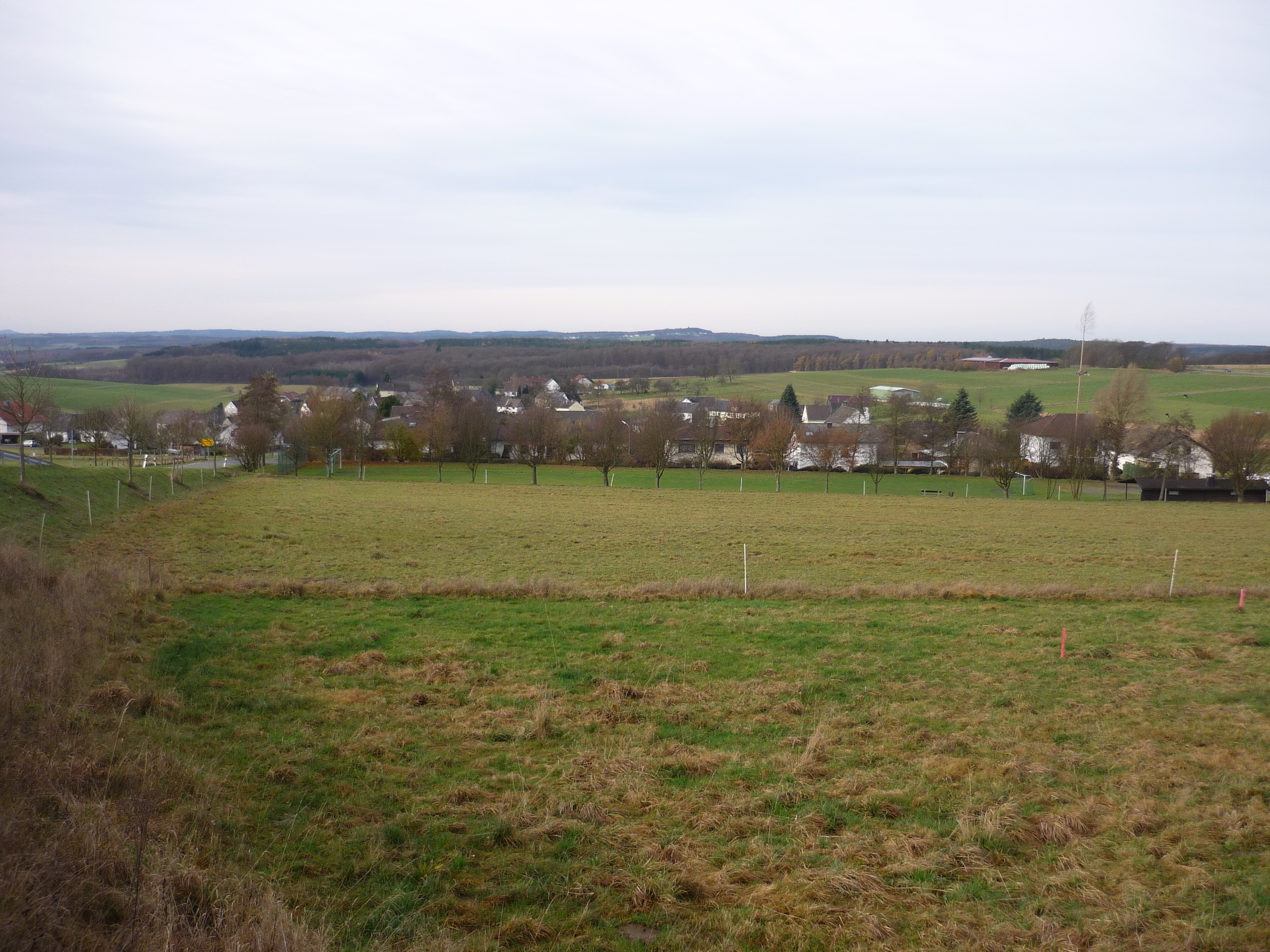

- Coat of arms

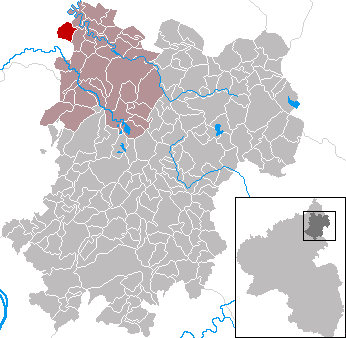
- Location of Giesenhausen within Westerwaldkreis district
- Interactive map of Giesenhausen
- Location within Germany Location within Rhineland-Palatinate
- Coordinates: 50°42′13″N 7°43′23″E
- Country: Germany
- State: Rhineland-Palatinate
- District: Westerwaldkreis
- Municipal assoc.: Hachenburg

Government
  - Mayor (2024–-): Astrid Lauer

Area
  - Total: 4.88 km^{2} (1.88 sq mi)
- Elevation: 300 m (980 ft)

Population (2025-12-31)
  - Total: 334
  - Density: 68.4/km^{2} (177/sq mi)
- Time zone: UTC+01:00 (CET)
  - Summer (DST): UTC+02:00 (CEST)
- Postal codes: 57612
- Dialling codes: 02688
- Vehicle registration: WW
- Website: giesenhausen.de

Giesenhausen is an Ortsgemeinde – a municipality belonging to a Verbandsgemeinde – in the Westerwaldkreis in Rhineland-Palatinate, Germany.

== Geography ==
The municipality lies in the Westerwald between Limburg and Siegen, on the edge of the Kroppach Switzerland. The agriculturally oriented residential municipality of Giesenhausen belongs to the Verbandsgemeinde of Hachenburg, a kind of collective municipality. Its seat is in the like-named town.

== History ==
In 1311, Giesenhausen had its first documentary mention.

== Politics ==
The municipal council is made up of 8 council members who were elected in a majority vote in a municipal election in May 2014.

== Regular events ==
The Maifest (“May Festival”), held yearly on 30 April at the grill lodge and organized by the Maijugend (“May Youth”) is a highlight in municipality life.

== Economy and infrastructure ==
South of the municipality runs Bundesstraße 414 leading from Hohenroth to Hachenburg. The nearest Autobahn interchanges are in Siegen, Wilnsdorf and Herborn on the A 45 (Dortmund–Aschaffenburg), some 25 km away. The nearest InterCityExpress stop is the railway station at Montabaur on the Cologne-Frankfurt high-speed rail line.
