= Steinebach =

Steinebach may refer to:

- Steinebach an der Wied, a municipality in the Westerwald district, Rhineland-Palatinate, Germany
- Steinebach/Sieg, a municipality in the district of Altenkirchen, Rhineland-Palatinate, Germany
- Steinebach (Kinzig), a river of Hesse, Germany, tributary of the Kinzig
