= Streithausen =

- Municipality
- Coat of arms

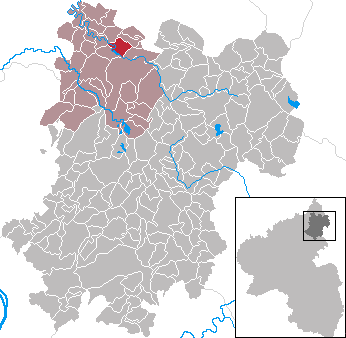
- Location of Streithausen within Westerwaldkreis district
- Interactive map of Streithausen
- Location within Germany Location within Rhineland-Palatinate
- Coordinates: 50°41′37″N 7°48′55″E
- Country: Germany
- State: Rhineland-Palatinate
- District: Westerwaldkreis
- Municipal assoc.: Hachenburg

Government
  - Mayor (2019–24): Eric Kohlhaas

Area
  - Total: 3.92 km^{2} (1.51 sq mi)
- Elevation: 280 m (920 ft)

Population (2025-12-31)
  - Total: 483
  - Density: 123/km^{2} (319/sq mi)
- Time zone: UTC+01:00 (CET)
  - Summer (DST): UTC+02:00 (CEST)
- Postal codes: 57629
- Dialling codes: 02662
- Vehicle registration: WW
- Website: www.streithausen.de

Streithausen is an Ortsgemeinde – a community belonging to a Verbandsgemeinde – and a state-recognized tourism community (Fremdenverkehrsgemeinde) in the Westerwaldkreis in Rhineland-Palatinate, Germany.

== Geography ==
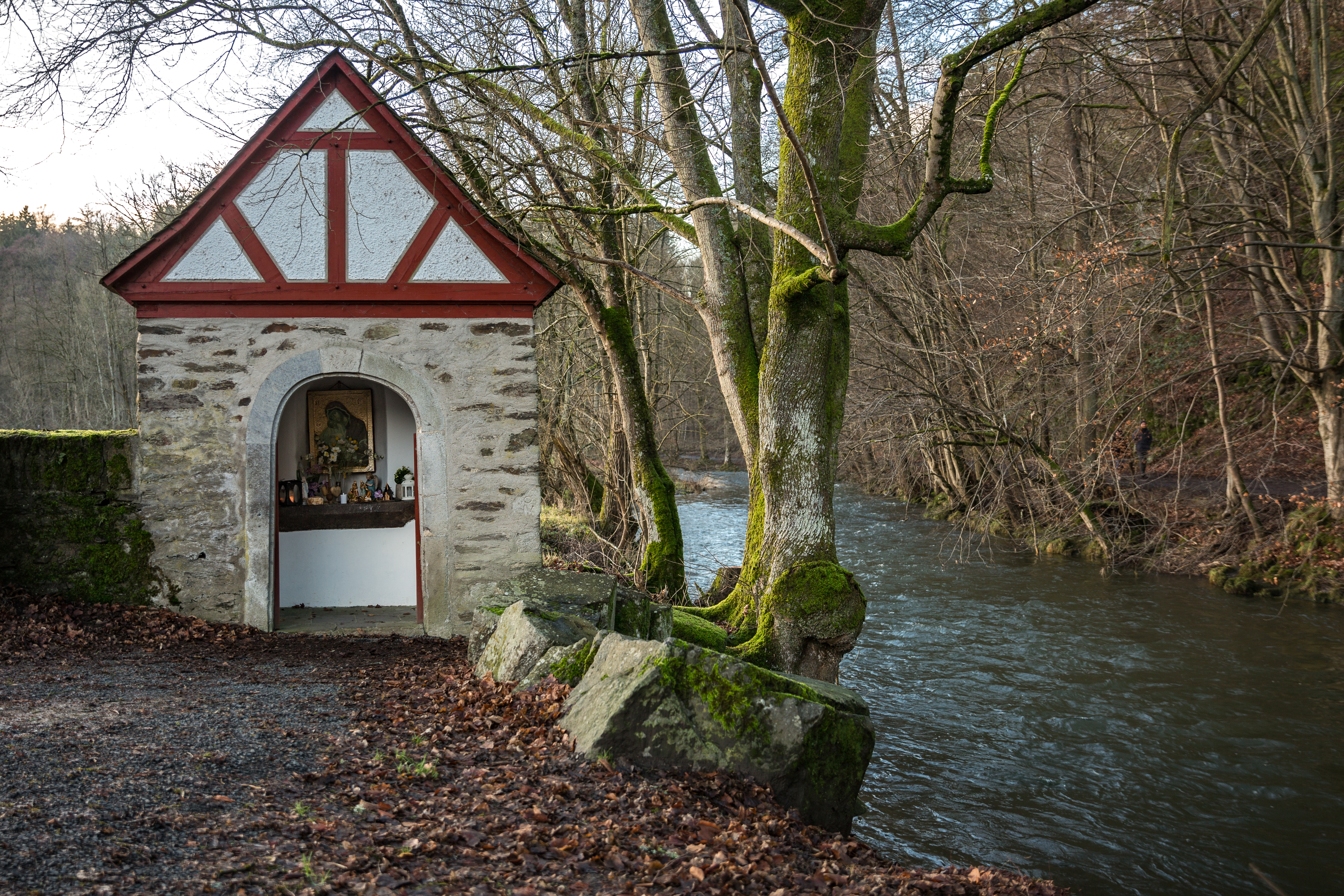
Nister in Streithausen

=== Location ===
With reference to the broader area, Streithausen lies between Koblenz and Siegen in the north–south axis and between Cologne and Frankfurt in the east–west axis in the northern Westerwald, which likewise forms the northern part of Rhineland-Palatinate. The community is regarded as part of the Kroppach Switzerland (Kroppacher Schweiz), a nature and landscape conservation area characterized by the Große Nister and Kleine Nister with their narrow valleys and in places steep mountain slopes. The village lies south of the Kleine Nister in a side valley, which has been built up, or is being built up, on both slopes (south slope with the Ley and Sonnenberg, north slope with the Leychen and Hofberg). Streithausen belongs to the Verbandsgemeinde of Hachenburg, a kind of collective municipality. Its seat is in the like-named town.

=== Neighbouring communities ===
The municipal area comprises 392 ha in elevations ranging from 230 to 380 m above sea level. It borders in the northeast on Atzelgift’s and Nister’s municipal areas. From the southeast to the southwest at the Große Nister, Streithausen abuts Hachenburg, Müschenbach and Astert, in the west on Limbach and in the northwest at the Kleine Nister on Limbach und Atzelgift. The community limit stretches for roughly 15 km.

=== Constituent communities ===
Besides the individual estates of Kempfsmühle north of the Kleine Nister at the forest’s edge, Morgensonne to the southeast on the road between Luckenbach and Hachenburg, and Kellershof to the south on the boundary with Nister, the Cistercian monastery of Marienstatt, founded in 1222, also belongs to Streithausen.

=== Climate ===
Streithausen falls into the northwest-German climatic zone and is included in the climatic regions of the Bergisches Land, the Sauerland, the Eifel and the Middle Rhine Valley. The macroclimate is marked by maritime influences. Yearly precipitation averages 1 150 mm. The mean yearly temperature is 7.8 °C.

== History ==
The community’s first documentary mention bears the date 2 November 1279. In 2004, Streithausen celebrated its 725-year jubilee with a great ceremonial act and a play written specially for the occasion. That same year, Streithausen was chosen as the loveliest village in the Westerwaldkreis.

== Culture and sightseeing ==
=== Buildings ===
Marienstatt Abbey, main building

Worth seeing are various timber-frame houses in the heart of the community, among them the community house Scholtzenhaus, and also the community-owned Marienstatt Abbey with its Gymnasium, brewhouse and bookshop.

=== Regular events ===
There, every year, the locally famous Streitser Kirmes is held, at which traditional customs are still practised today as a conclusion. The Streithausen fair company had its 30-year jubilee in 2005.

== Economy and infrastructure ==
The community has at its disposal a library, children’s playgrounds, leisure and sport facilities and an extensive hiking path network with connections to the Kroppach Switzerland.

=== Education ===
The community is the primary school centre for four Ortsgemeinden, in Marienstatt Abbey also a Gymnasium is located which belongs to the monastery.

Within these four communities (Limbach, Streithausen, Atzelgift and Luckenbach), municipal, cultural and sporting facilities are integrated. As part of this arrangement, the community of Streithausen also keeps a common sport ground and plots of land for possible later collective intentions (for instance a sporthall at the primary school) in the Nasse Heide (“Wet Heath”) area.

The fairground on district road (Kreisstraße) K 20 is used not only by Streithausen but also by the neighbouring community of Atzelgift.

=== Transport ===
Nearest accessabilities to train service are the Hattert stop and the Hachenburg station. The local bus line 270 connects Streithausen with Hachenburg and Betzdorf. Streithausen is located in the area of the transport association Verkehrsverbund Rhein-Mosel (VRM), in the fare zone number 453. The Marienwanderweg is a walking path leading from Marienstatt Abbey in Streithausen to Marienthal Abbey (Westerwald).

=== Electricity ===
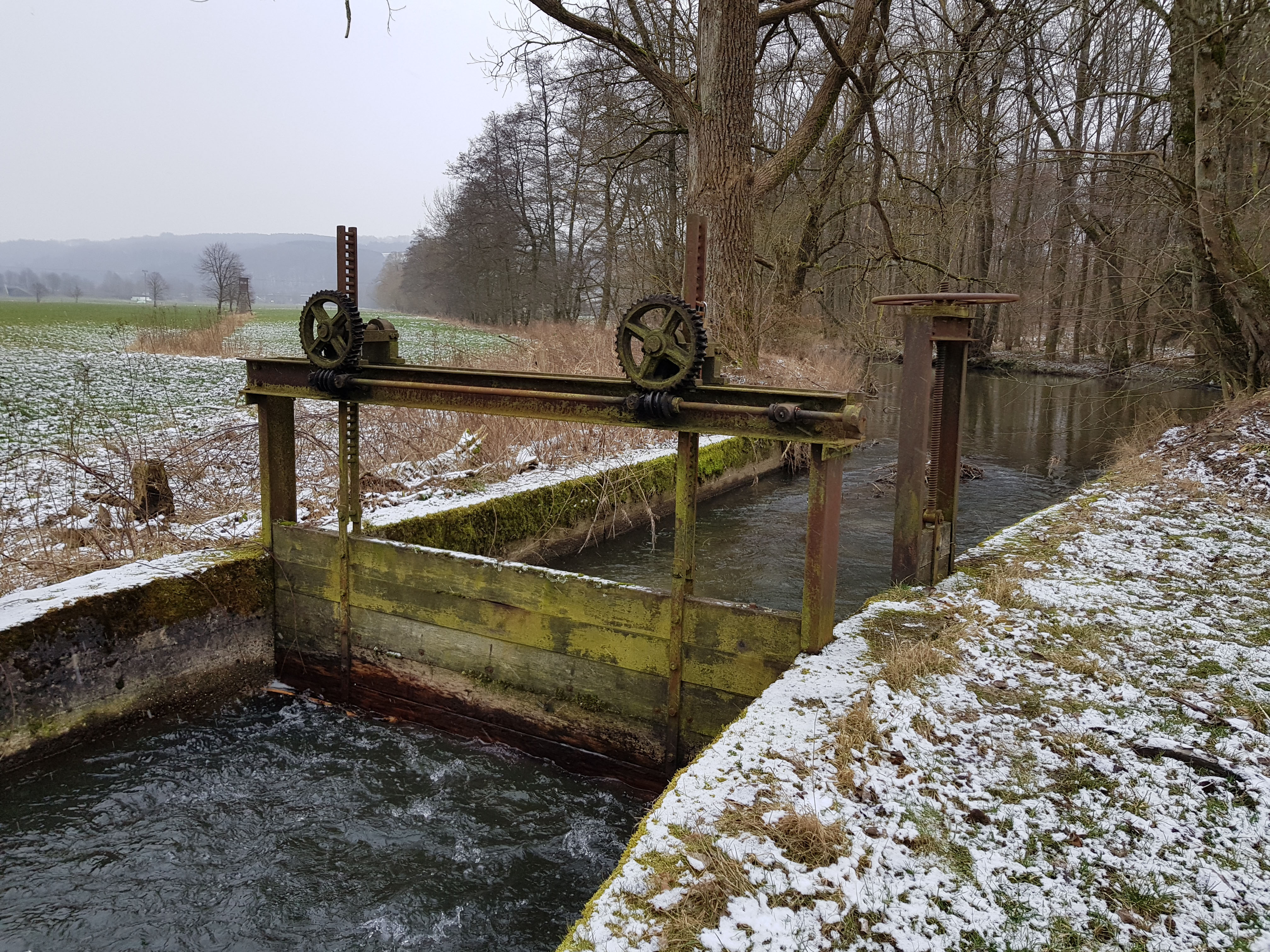
Hydropower in Streithausen

In Streithausen, electrity is produced by hydropower.
