= Borod =

- Municipality
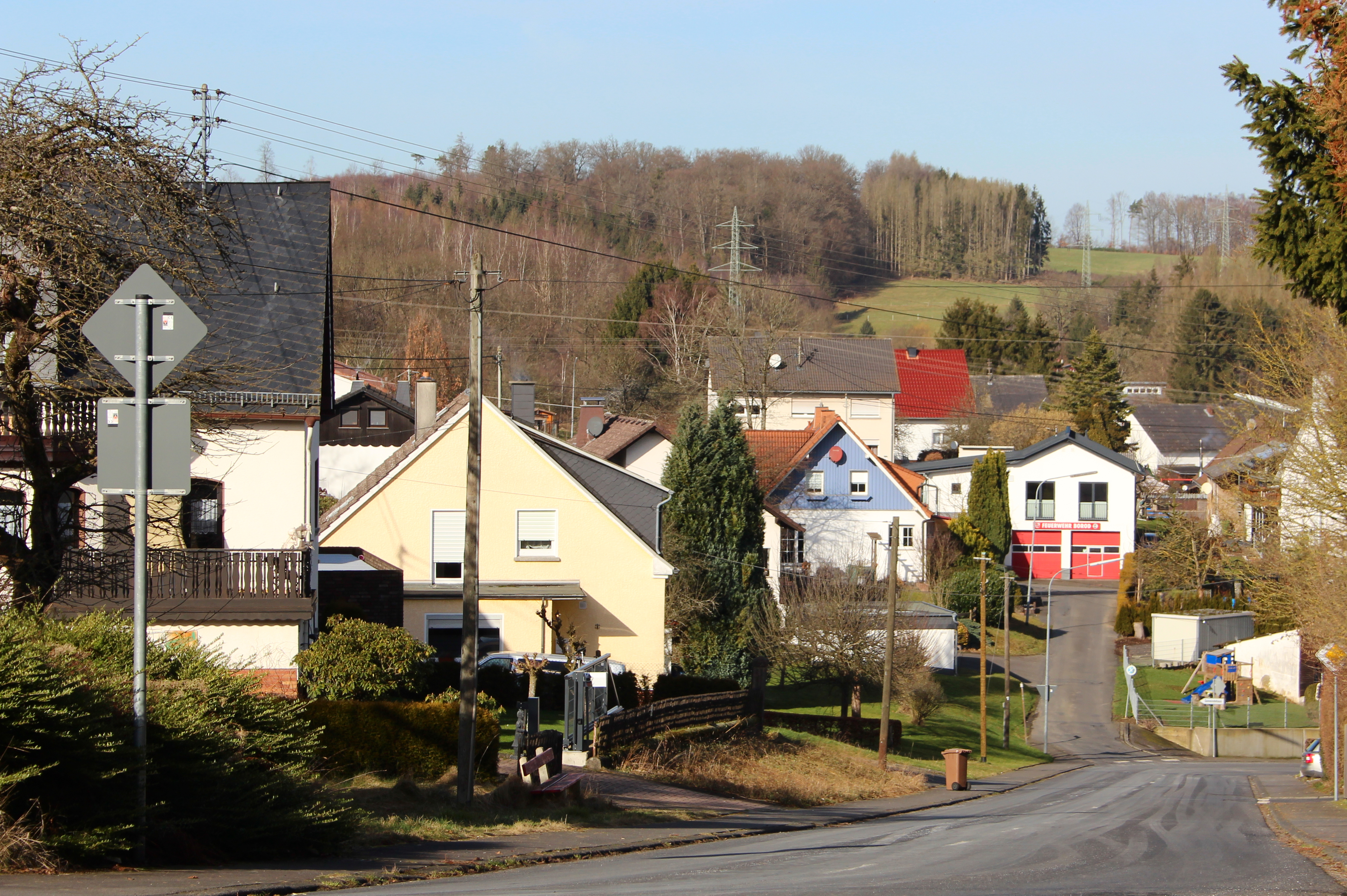

- Coat of arms

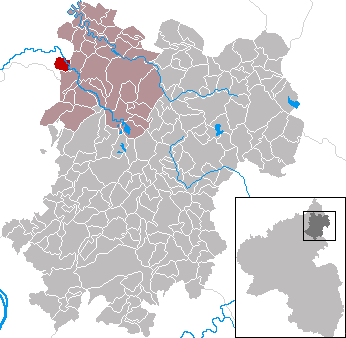
- Location of Borod within Westerwaldkreis district
- Interactive map of Borod
- Location within Germany Location within Rhineland-Palatinate
- Coordinates: 50°40′03″N 7°42′35″E
- Country: Germany
- State: Rhineland-Palatinate
- District: Westerwaldkreis
- Municipal assoc.: Hachenburg

Government
  - Mayor (2019–24): Volkmar Gäfgen

Area
  - Total: 3.14 km^{2} (1.21 sq mi)
- Elevation: 280 m (920 ft)

Population (2025-12-31)
  - Total: 561
  - Density: 179/km^{2} (463/sq mi)
- Time zone: UTC+01:00 (CET)
  - Summer (DST): UTC+02:00 (CEST)
- Postal codes: 57614
- Dialling codes: 02688
- Vehicle registration: WW
- Website: www.gemeinde-borod.de

Borod is an Ortsgemeinde – a municipality belonging to a Verbandsgemeinde – in the Westerwaldkreis in Rhineland-Palatinate, Germany.

== Geography ==
On the western boundary of the Verbandsgemeinde of Hachenburg – a kind of collective municipality – in the northwestern Westerwaldkreis lies the municipality of Borod in a side valley of the river Wied. The municipality stretches from the bonemill on the Wied in a southwesterly direction. Borod belongs to the Verbandsgemeinde of Hachenburg, whose seat is in the like-named town.

The municipality has an area of 314 ha, of which 101 ha is wooded and 272 ha is given over to agriculture, The rest is the built-up area. The municipality's elevation ranges between 248 and 336 m above sea level. The yearly average temperature is roughly 8 °C. Yearly average precipitation is 900 mm. The high proportion of wooded land guarantees a great wealth of water. The landscape's diversity with its extensive forests, many hedgerows and groves and good water-conducting vegetation form the best conditions for a high quality of life, recreation close to nature and nature-oriented hiking.

== History ==
In the years 1454 to 1465, Borod had its first documentary mention as Burnroede.

== Politics ==
The municipal council is made up of 12 council members, including the honorary mayor (Oberbürgermeister), who were elected in a majority vote in a municipal election on 7 June 2009.

	Freie Wählergruppen	Total
2002	2	12 seats, as of Nov 2006 only 11 owing to missing succeeding candidates

== Economy and infrastructure ==
=== Transport ===
Borod is located in the area of the transport association Verkehrsverbund Rhein-Mosel (VRM) and served by the local bus lines 408 and 413 and also favourably linked to the long-distance road network by Bundesstraße 8. The Bundesstraße joins the municipality with the middle centres of Hachenburg (10 km) and Altenkirchen (6 km). To reach the Autobahn interchanges at Mogendorf (25 km) and Dierdorf (28 km), drivers take Bundesstraßen 8 and 413. Bundesstraße 8 also affords direct access to the Autobahn interchange at Hennef on the A 560 (AS 60) (50 km). Borod is located on Westerwaldsteig, a long distance walking path from Herborn via Rennerod, Westerburg, Bad Marienberg and Hachenburg to Bad Hönningen.

=== Public institutions ===
Public institutions are concentrated around the former school whose tower can be seen far afield. Right near this stand the primary school and the municipality house, in which is also found the fire brigade's equipment house. A bus loop with a waiting building rounds out the municipality institutions in the middle of the municipality. A qualified village renewal concept guarantees positive development in both the public and private sectors.

=== Personalities born in Borod ===
- Ewald Schnug (1930–2013), Master Gardener, Bearer of the Federal Cross of Merit, First Alderman of Altenkirchen, Gamekeeper's ring leader, County hunting master

=== Education ===
Preschool-age children are served by the kindergarten in Wahlrod. Schoolchildren go to the primary school in Borod, the Hauptschule and Realschule in Hachenburg or the Gymnasien in Altenkirchen, Marienstatt and Dierdorf, each of which can be reached by public bus.
