= Wied, Rhineland-Palatinate =

Wied
- Municipality
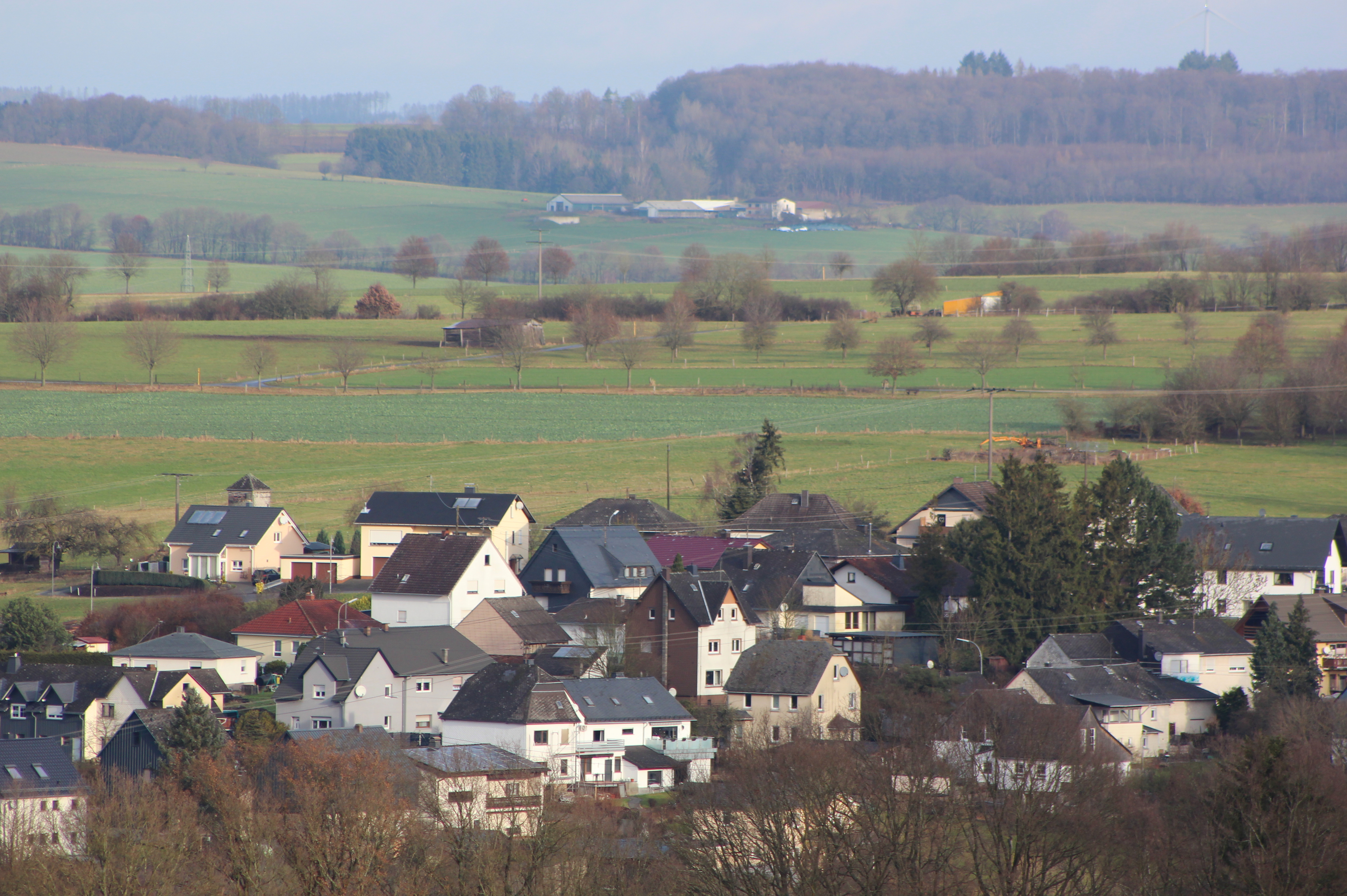

- Coat of arms

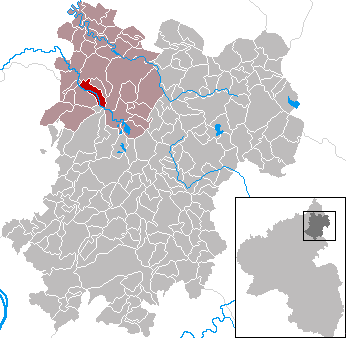
- Location of Wied within Westerwaldkreis district
- Interactive map of Wied
- Location within Germany Location within Rhineland-Palatinate
- Coordinates: 50°38′21″N 7°45′26″E
- Country: Germany
- State: Rhineland-Palatinate
- District: Westerwaldkreis
- Municipal assoc.: Hachenburg

Government
  - Mayor (2019–24): Birgit Hopfinger

Area
  - Total: 4.69 km^{2} (1.81 sq mi)
- Elevation: 305 m (1,001 ft)

Population (2025-12-31)
  - Total: 537
  - Density: 114/km^{2} (297/sq mi)
- Time zone: UTC+01:00 (CET)
  - Summer (DST): UTC+02:00 (CEST)
- Postal codes: 57629
- Dialling codes: 02662
- Vehicle registration: WW
- Website: www.ww-wied.de

Wied (German pronunciation: [viːt]) is an Ortsgemeinde – a community belonging to a Verbandsgemeinde – in the Westerwaldkreis in Rhineland-Palatinate, Germany.

== Geography ==
The community lies in the Westerwald between Limburg and Siegen in the Wied valley. Through the community flows the Wied. Wied belongs to the Verbandsgemeinde of Hachenburg, a kind of collective municipality. Its seat is in the like-named town.

== History ==
In 1461, Wied had its first documentary mention. Originally, Wied was called Wiede, which meant something like “grazing land” (Weide in modern German).

== Politics ==
The municipal council is made up of 13 council members, including the honorary mayor (Bürgermeister), who were elected in a majority vote in a municipal election on 13 June 2004.

== Economy and infrastructure ==
=== Traffic ===
The local bus line 420 connects Wied to the public transport, the college is located in the fare zone number 434 of the public transport association Verkehrsverbund Rhein-Mosel (VRM).

In the past also the Selters-Hachenburg narrow gauge railway passed Wied on its way from Selters via Hattert to Hachenburg.

The community lies right on Bundesstraße 413, leading from Bendorf (near Koblenz) to Hachenburg. The nearest Autobahn interchanges are in Dierdorf and Neuwied on the A 3 (Cologne–Frankfurt), some 20 km away.

The nearest accessabilities of train service are Hattert stop and Hachenburg station, the nearest InterCityExpress stop is the railway station at Montabaur on the Cologne-Frankfurt high-speed rail line.

=== Kliniken Wied ===
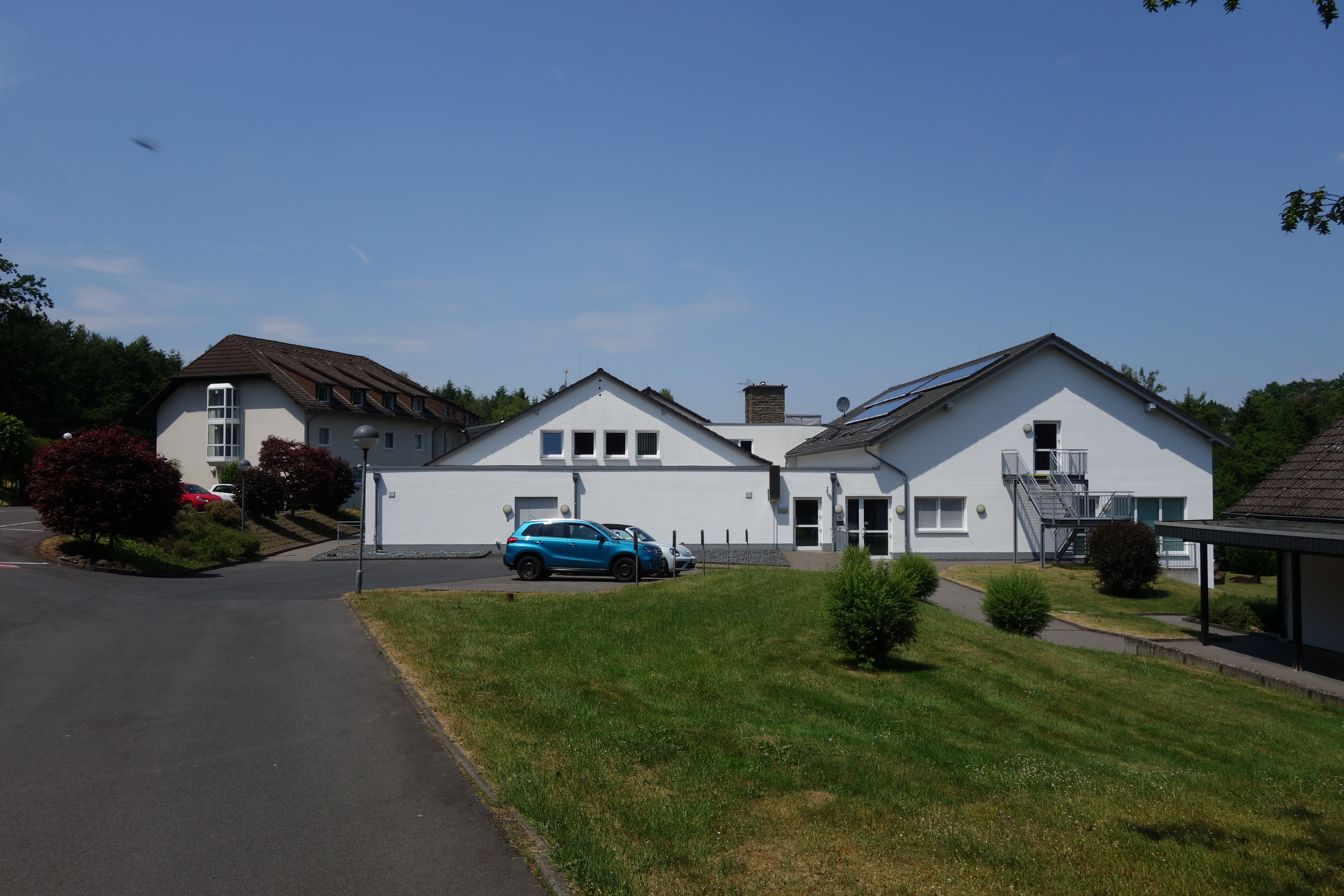
Kliniken Wied, Haus Mühlental

Kliniken Wied (i. e. 'Clinics Wied') is by far the biggest employer of the community. It consists of Haus Mühlental (House Mill valley) in Wied and Haus Sonnenhang (House Sunny slope) in Steimel, both specialised on addiction disorder and psychosomatics. Altogether there are 214 therapy places served by 166 employees. Since 2019 both clinics are part of the Median corporation.
