= Steinebach an der Wied =

- Municipality
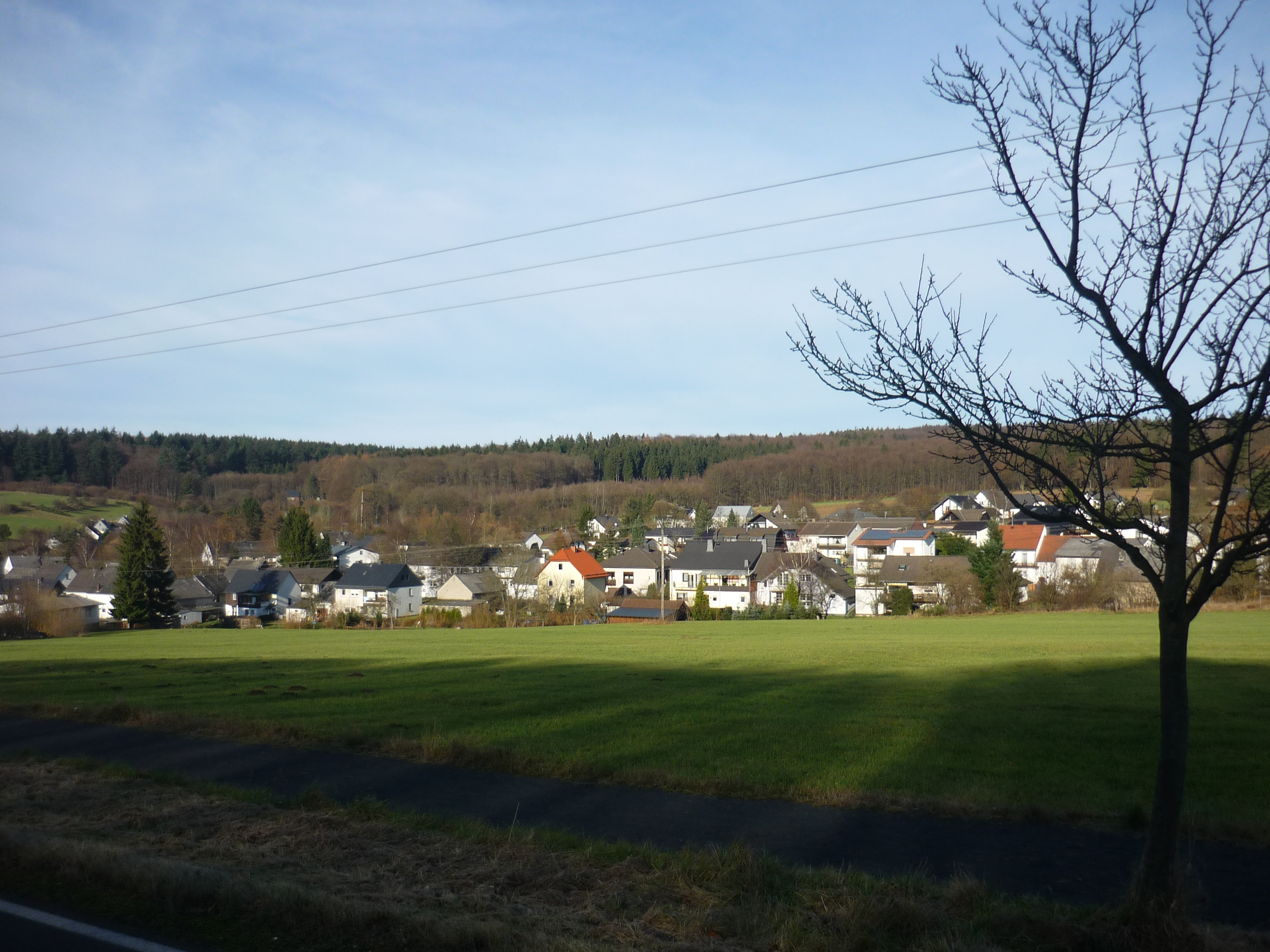

- Coat of arms

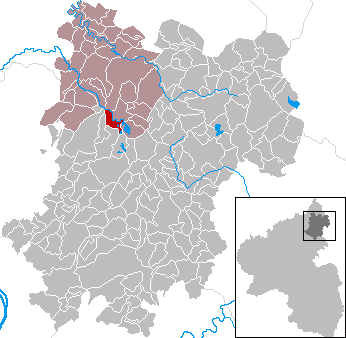
- Location of Steinebach an der Wied within Westerwaldkreis district
- Interactive map of Steinebach an der Wied
- Location within Germany Location within Rhineland-Palatinate
- Coordinates: 50°36′36″N 7°48′17″E
- Country: Germany
- State: Rhineland-Palatinate
- District: Westerwaldkreis
- Municipal assoc.: Hachenburg
- Subdivisions: 4

Government
  - Mayor (2019–24): Heinz Schneider

Area
  - Total: 8.30 km^{2} (3.20 sq mi)
- Elevation: 378 m (1,240 ft)

Population (2025-12-31)
  - Total: 822
  - Density: 99.0/km^{2} (257/sq mi)
- Time zone: UTC+01:00 (CET)
  - Summer (DST): UTC+02:00 (CEST)
- Postal codes: 57629
- Dialling codes: 02662
- Vehicle registration: WW
- Website: www.steinebach-wied.de

Steinebach an der Wied is an Ortsgemeinde – a community belonging to a Verbandsgemeinde – in the Westerwaldkreis in Rhineland-Palatinate, Germany.

== Geography ==
=== Location ===
On the southern boundary of the Verbandsgemeinde of Hachenburg (a kind of collective municipality whose seat is in the like-named town), in the northwest of the Westerwaldkreis, on the Westerwald Lake Plateau and on the Wied lies the community of Steinebach an der Wied.

=== Constituent communities ===
Steinebach an der Wied's Ortsteile are Steinebach, Schmidthahn, Langenbaum and Seeburg.

== Politics ==
The municipal council is made up of 13 council members, including the extraofficial mayor (Bürgermeister), who were elected in a majority vote in a municipal election on 13 June 2004.

== Culture and sightseeing ==
=== Buildings ===
In the community are found the ruins of a castle, Burg Steinebach (on the Wied).

== Economy and infrastructure ==
Steinebach an der Wied is linked to the long-distance road network by Bundesstraße 8, which also links the community with the middle centres of Hachenburg and Altenkirchen. The Autobahn interchanges Mogendorf and Dierdorf on the A 3 (Cologne–Frankfurt) can be reached by way of Bundesstraße 8/Bundesstraße 413. The Hennef interchange on the A 5 can be reached directly by Bundesstraße 8. The nearest InterCityExpress stop is the railway station at Montabaur on the Cologne-Frankfurt high-speed rail line.
