= Lochum =

- Municipality
- Coat of arms

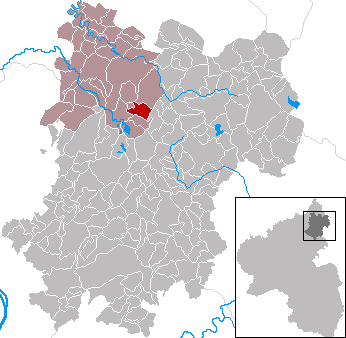
- Location of Lochum within Westerwaldkreis district
- Interactive map of Lochum
- Location within Germany Location within Rhineland-Palatinate
- Coordinates: 50°36′38″N 7°51′35″E
- Country: Germany
- State: Rhineland-Palatinate
- District: Westerwaldkreis
- Municipal assoc.: Hachenburg

Government
  - Mayor (2019–24): Frank Petmecky

Area
  - Total: 4.65 km^{2} (1.80 sq mi)
- Elevation: 467 m (1,532 ft)

Population (2025-12-31)
  - Total: 289
  - Density: 62.2/km^{2} (161/sq mi)
- Time zone: UTC+01:00 (CET)
  - Summer (DST): UTC+02:00 (CEST)
- Postal codes: 57629
- Dialling codes: 02666
- Vehicle registration: WW
- Website: www.hachenburg-vg.de/08_gemeinden/lochum

Lochum is an Ortsgemeinde – a community belonging to a Verbandsgemeinde – in the Westerwaldkreis in Rhineland-Palatinate, Germany.

== Geography ==
The village is located in the northeast of Koblenz on the Westerwald Lake Plateau. The residential community of Lochum belongs to the Verbandsgemeinde of Hachenburg, a kind of collective municipality. Its administrative center is the homonym town.

== History ==
In 1048, Lochum had its first documentary mention.

== Politics ==
The municipal council is made up of 9 council members, including the extraofficial mayor (Bürgermeister), who were elected in a majority vote in a municipal election on 13 June 2004.

== Economy and infrastructure ==
The local bus lines 430, 431 and 433 serve Lochum, it is located in the area of the transport association Verkehrsverbund Rhein-Mosel (VRM), in the fare zone number 430. The community lies between Bundesstraßen 255, linking Koblenz and Hachenburg, and 414, leading from Montabaur to Herborn. Bundesautobahn 3 with its Montabaur interchange (AS 40) lies 25 km away. The nearest access to railway service is Rotenhain station at the Limburg-Altenkirchen railway, nearest InterCityExpress stop is Montabaur station on the Cologne-Frankfurt high-speed rail line.
