= Gehlert =

- Municipality
- Coat of arms

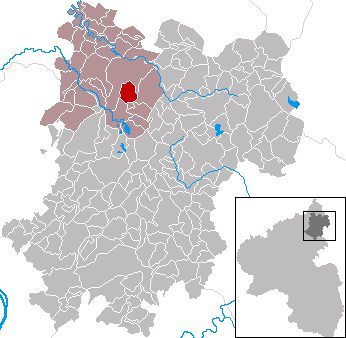
- Location of Gehlert within Westerwaldkreis district
- Interactive map of Gehlert
- Location within Germany Location within Rhineland-Palatinate
- Coordinates: 50°38′30″N 7°49′46″E
- Country: Germany
- State: Rhineland-Palatinate
- District: Westerwaldkreis
- Municipal assoc.: Hachenburg

Government
  - Mayor (2019–24): Elsabe Giese

Area
  - Total: 5.19 km^{2} (2.00 sq mi)
- Elevation: 400 m (1,300 ft)

Population (2025-12-31)
  - Total: 596
  - Density: 115/km^{2} (297/sq mi)
- Time zone: UTC+01:00 (CET)
  - Summer (DST): UTC+02:00 (CEST)
- Postal codes: 57627
- Dialling codes: 02662
- Vehicle registration: WW
- Website: www.gemeinde-gehlert.de

Gehlert is an Ortsgemeinde – a municipality belonging to a Verbandsgemeinde – in the Westerwaldkreis in Rhineland-Palatinate, Germany.

== Geography ==
The municipality lies in the Westerwald between Limburg and Siegen, roughly 2 km south of Hachenburg. Gehlert belongs to the Verbandsgemeinde of Hachenburg, a kind of collective municipality. Its seat is in the like-named town.

== History ==
In 1255, Gehlert had its first documentary mention as Geilinrode.

== Politics ==
The municipal council is made up of 12 council members who were elected in a majority vote in a municipal election on 7 June 2009.

== Regular events ==
The yearly Whitsun kermis is the highlight of municipality life.

== Economy and infrastructure ==
Northwest of the municipality runs Bundesstraße 413 leading from Bendorf (near Koblenz) to Hachenburg. The nearest Autobahn interchanges are in Siegen, Wilnsdorf and Herborn on the A 45 (Dortmund–Gießen) and also in Mogendorf on the A 3 (Cologne–Frankfurt), some 25 km away. The nearest InterCityExpress stop is the railway station at Montabaur on the Cologne-Frankfurt high-speed rail line. Gehlert is also located beside the Wiedweg, a long distance walking path from Hachenburg via Altenkirchen to Leutesdorf at the Rhine.
