= Kroppach =

- Municipality
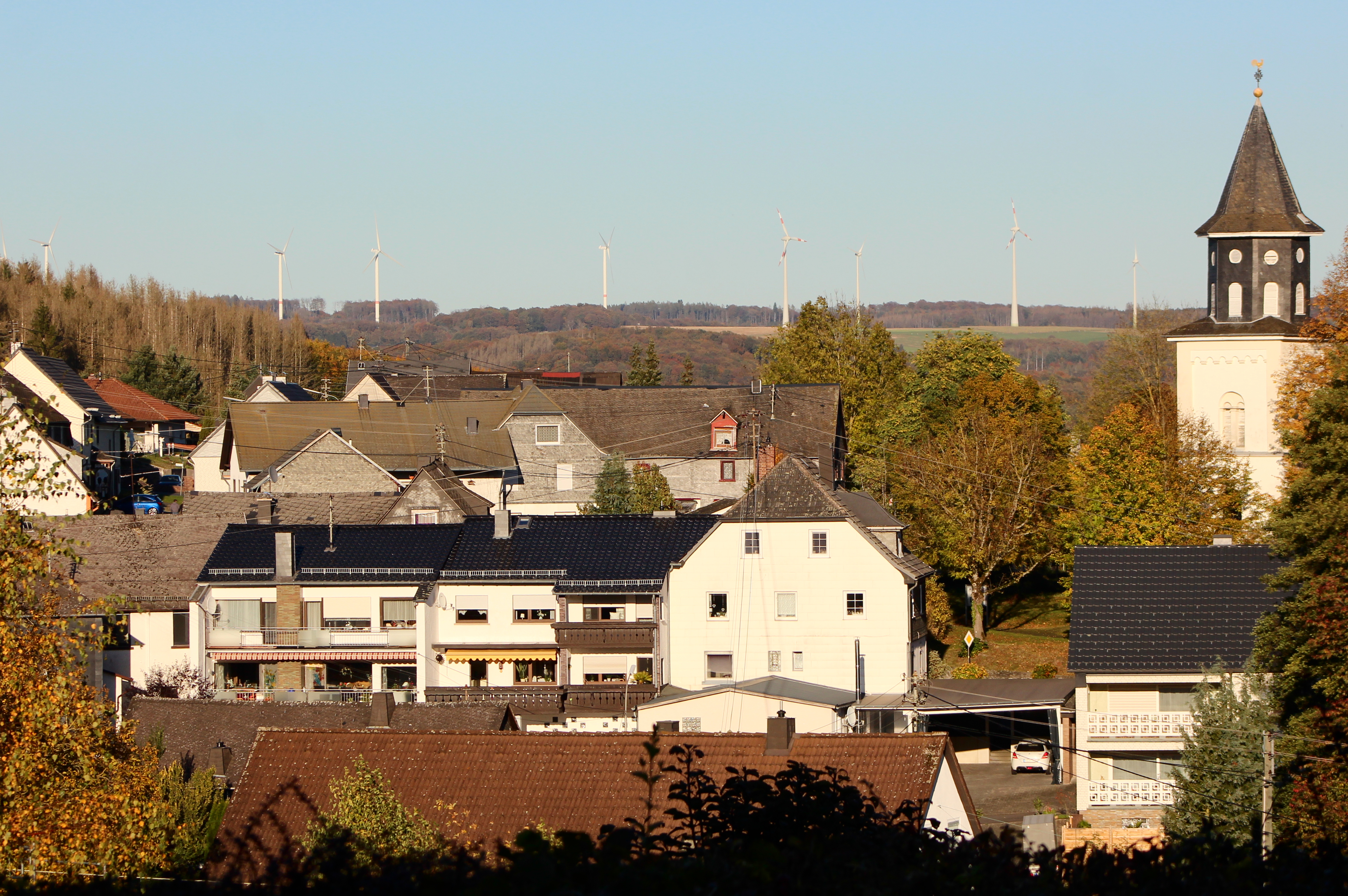

- Coat of arms

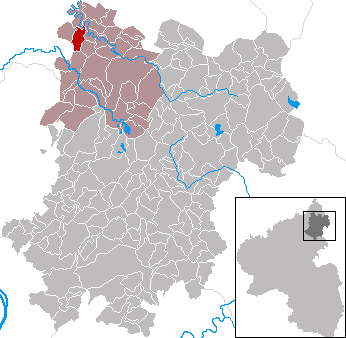
- Location of Kroppach within Westerwaldkreis district
- Interactive map of Kroppach
- Location within Germany Location within Rhineland-Palatinate
- Coordinates: 50°41′44″N 7°44′25″E
- Country: Germany
- State: Rhineland-Palatinate
- District: Westerwaldkreis
- Municipal assoc.: Hachenburg

Government
  - Mayor (2019–24): Michael Birk

Area
  - Total: 3.97 km^{2} (1.53 sq mi)
- Elevation: 319 m (1,047 ft)

Population (2025-12-31)
  - Total: 780
  - Density: 200/km^{2} (510/sq mi)
- Time zone: UTC+01:00 (CET)
  - Summer (DST): UTC+02:00 (CEST)
- Postal codes: 57612
- Dialling codes: 02688
- Vehicle registration: WW
- Website: www.gemeinde-kroppach.de

Kroppach is an Ortsgemeinde – a community belonging to a Verbandsgemeinde – in the Westerwaldkreis in Rhineland-Palatinate, Germany. The agriculturally structured residential community of Kroppach belongs to the Verbandsgemeinde of Hachenburg, a kind of collective municipality. Its seat is in the like-named town.

== Geography ==
The community lies between Hachenburg and Altenkirchen and is described as the gateway to the Kroppach Switzerland nature and landscape conservation area.

== History ==
In 1199, Kroppach had its first documentary mention. In 1999, this event was the subject of a celebratory publication (Festschrift). Kroppach was for a long time the seat of a tithe court and had its own court seal. In 1661, a so-called Kirchspiel-Winterschule (“parish winter school”) was established, which 70 years later, beginning in 1731, was also run the year round.

== Politics ==
The municipal council is made up of 12 council members who were elected in a majority vote in a municipal election on 13 June 2004.

== Culture and sightseeing ==
=== Parks ===
The local recreation area, called the Kroppacher Schweiz, or “Kroppach Switzerland”, with its many hiking paths and panoramas into the Nister Valley is a recognized nature and landscape conservation area.

== Economy and infrastructure ==
=== Transport ===
Ingelbach station , street view from the direction of Kroppach

The train station named "Ingelbach" of the Limburg-Altenkirchen railway is located at the border of Kroppach and Ingelbach. South of the community runs Bundesstraße 414, leading from Hohenroth to Hachenburg. The local bus linies 408, 410 and 255 serve Kroppach, the village is located in the area of the transport association Verkehrsverbund Rhein-Mosel (VRM), fare zone number 452. The nearest Autobahn interchanges are in Siegen, Wilnsdorf and Herborn on the A 45 (Dortmund–Gießen). The nearest InterCityExpress stop is the railway station at Montabaur on the Cologne-Frankfurt high-speed rail line.

=== Energy ===
Sustainable electricity production takes place in the area of Kroppach/Giesenhausen through a Wind farm as well as a Solar park.
