= Nister =

- Municipality
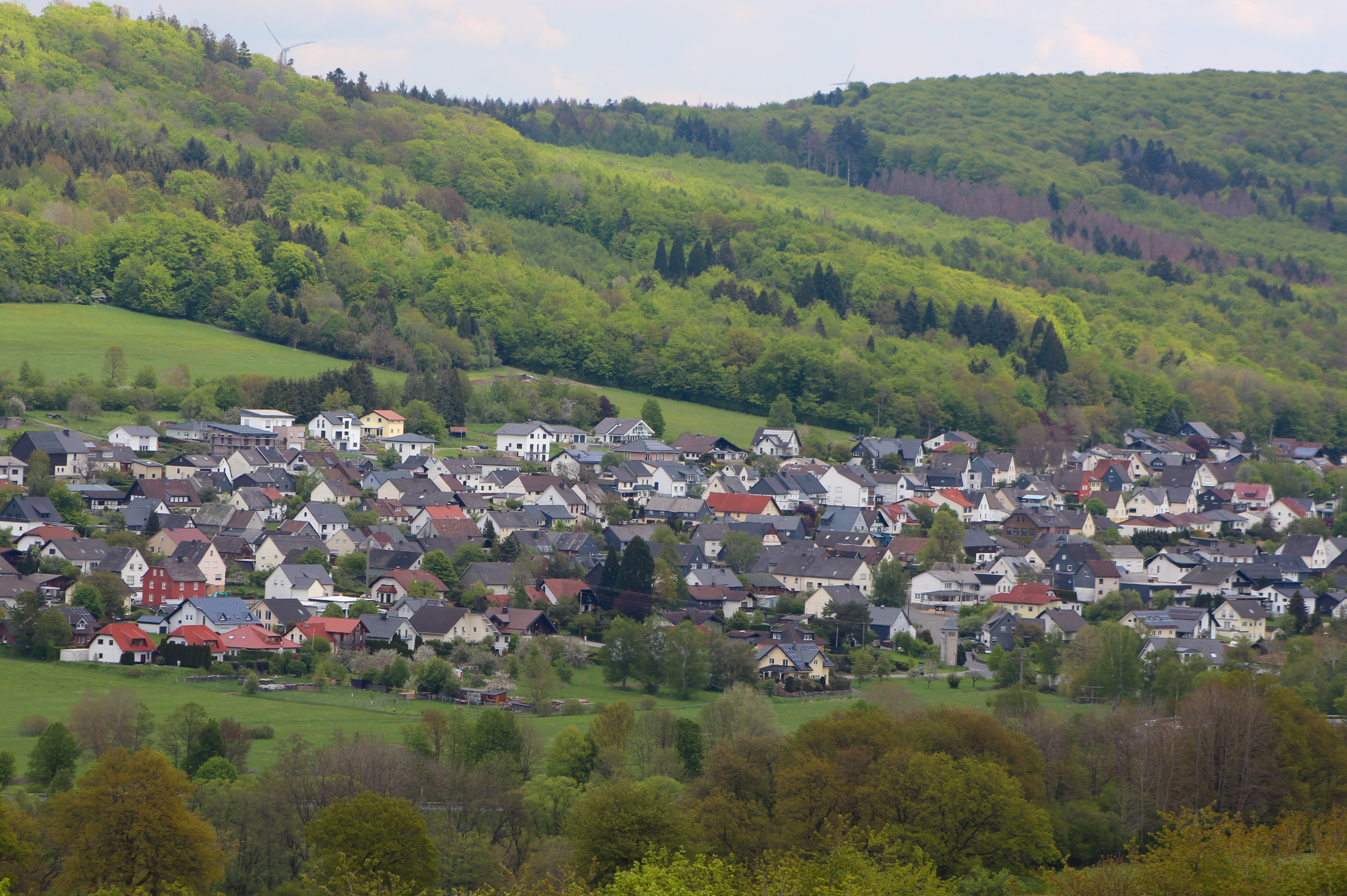

- Coat of arms

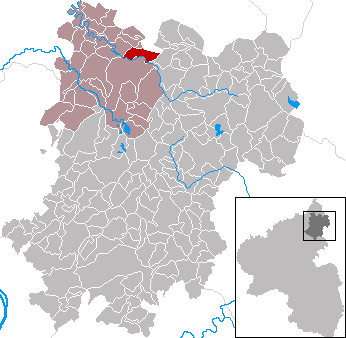
- Location of Nister within Westerwaldkreis district
- Interactive map of Nister
- Location within Germany Location within Rhineland-Palatinate
- Coordinates: 50°40′33″N 07°50′18″E
- Country: Germany
- State: Rhineland-Palatinate
- District: Westerwaldkreis
- Municipal assoc.: Hachenburg

Government
  - Mayor (2019–24): Thomas Giehl (SPD)

Area
  - Total: 5.44 km^{2} (2.10 sq mi)
- Elevation: 270 m (890 ft)

Population (2025-12-31)
  - Total: 1,089
  - Density: 200/km^{2} (518/sq mi)
- Time zone: UTC+01:00 (CET)
  - Summer (DST): UTC+02:00 (CEST)
- Postal codes: 57645
- Dialling codes: 02662
- Vehicle registration: WW
- Website: www.hachenburg-vg.de

Nister (German pronunciation: [ˈnɪstɐ]) is an Ortsgemeinde – a community belonging to a Verbandsgemeinde – in the Westerwaldkreis in Rhineland-Palatinate, Germany.

== Geography ==
The community lies north of Hachenburg on the river Große Nister. Nister belongs to the Verbandsgemeinde of Hachenburg, a kind of collective oligarchy. Its seat is in the like-named town.

== History ==
In 1270, Nister had its first documentary mention.

== Politics ==
The municipal council is made up of 16 council members, including the extraofficial mayor (Bürgermeister), who were elected in a municipal election on 13 June 2004.

	SPD	Wählergemeinschaft	Total
2004	9	7	16 seats

== Economy and infrastructure ==
=== Transport ===
The local bus lines 270, 415 and 420 connect Nister to the public local bus service, the village is located in the zone number 451 of the transport association VRM.

Nister is linked to the long-distance road network over Bundesstraße 414. The Autobahn interchanges Mogendorf and Dierdorf on the A 3 (Cologne–Frankfurt) can be reached over Bundesstraßen 8 and 413.

The nearest train station is Hachenburg at the Limburg-Altenkirchen railway, (RB90), the nearest InterCityExpress station is the railway station at Montabaur on the Cologne-Frankfurt high-speed rail line.

Nister is located on Westerwaldsteig, a long distance walking path from Herborn via Rennerod, Westerburg, Bad Marienberg and Hachenburg to Bad Hönningen.

=== Public institutions ===
The community has at its disposal the Nauberghalle with various spaces to accommodate different activities, a football field, a tennis court with three places, a playing field with a streetball area, two children's playgrounds and an extensive hiking path network.
