= Atzelgift =

- Municipality
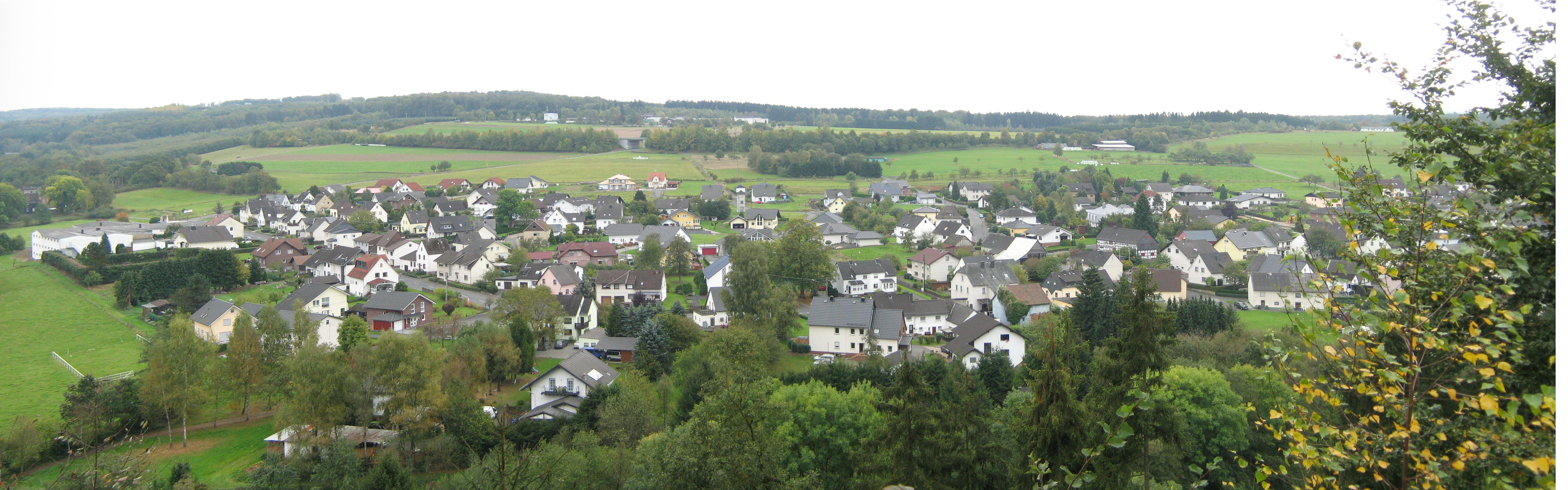

- Coat of arms

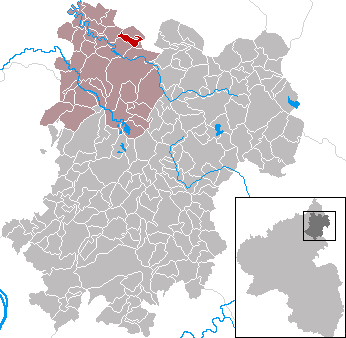
- Location of Atzelgift within Westerwaldkreis district
- Interactive map of Atzelgift
- Location within Germany Location within Rhineland-Palatinate
- Coordinates: 50°41′57″N 7°49′30″E
- Country: Germany
- State: Rhineland-Palatinate
- District: Westerwaldkreis
- Municipal assoc.: Hachenburg

Government
  - Mayor (2019–24): Claudia Kohlhaas

Area
  - Total: 2.74 km^{2} (1.06 sq mi)
- Elevation: 285 m (935 ft)

Population (2025-12-31)
  - Total: 622
  - Density: 227/km^{2} (588/sq mi)
- Time zone: UTC+01:00 (CET)
  - Summer (DST): UTC+02:00 (CEST)
- Postal codes: 57629
- Dialling codes: 02662
- Vehicle registration: WW
- Website: atzelgift.blogspot.com

Atzelgift (German pronunciation: [ˈatsl̩ˌɡɪft]) is an Ortsgemeinde – a municipality belonging to a Verbandsgemeinde – in the Westerwaldkreis in Rhineland-Palatinate, Germany.

== Geography ==
The municipality lies in the Westerwald between Limburg and Siegen, and is a recognized health resort (Erholungsort). Through the municipality flows the river Kleine Nister. Atzelgift belongs to the Verbandsgemeinde of Hachenburg, a kind of collective municipality. Its seat is in the like-named town.

== History ==
In 1396, Atzelgift had its first documentary mention under the name Hatzelgufte.

== Politics ==
The municipal council is made up of 12 council members who were elected by proportional representation in a municipal election on 25 May 2014.

== Economy and infrastructure ==
The local bus line 270 goes from Hachenburg via Atzelgift to Betzdorf. South of the municipality runs Bundesstraße 414, which leads from Betzdorf to Hachenburg. The nearest Autobahn interchanges are in Siegen, Herborn and Wilsdorf on the A 45 (Dortmund–Gießen), roughly 25 km (16 mi) away. The nearest InterCityExpress stop is at the railway station at Montabaur on the Cologne-Frankfurt high-speed rail line.
