= Hachenburg (Verbandsgemeinde) =

- Verbandsgemeinde
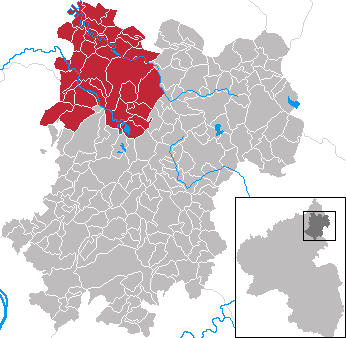
- Location of Hachenburg within Westerwaldkreis district
- Interactive map of Hachenburg
- Location within Germany Location within Rhineland-Palatinate
- Coordinates: 50°40′N 7°49′E
- Country: Germany
- State: Rhineland-Palatinate
- District: Westerwaldkreis
- Seat: Hachenburg
- Subdivisions: 33 municipalities

Area
  - Total: 173.87 km^{2} (67.13 sq mi)

Population (2025-12-31)
  - Total: 25,146
  - Density: 144.63/km^{2} (374.58/sq mi)
- Time zone: UTC+01:00 (CET)
  - Summer (DST): UTC+02:00 (CEST)
- Website: www.hachenburg-vg.de

Hachenburg is a Verbandsgemeinde ("collective municipality") in the district Westerwaldkreis, in Rhineland-Palatinate, Germany. The seat of the Verbandsgemeinde is in Hachenburg.

The Verbandsgemeinde Hachenburg consists of the following Ortsgemeinden ("local municipalities"):

1. Alpenrod
2. Astert
3. Atzelgift
4. Borod
5. Dreifelden
6. Gehlert
7. Giesenhausen
8. Hachenburg
9. Hattert
10. Heimborn
11. Heuzert
12. Höchstenbach
13. Kroppach
14. Kundert
15. Limbach
16. Linden
17. Lochum
18. Luckenbach
19. Marzhausen
20. Merkelbach
21. Mörsbach
22. Mudenbach
23. Mündersbach
24. Müschenbach
25. Nister
26. Roßbach
27. Steinebach an der Wied
28. Stein-Wingert
29. Streithausen
30. Wahlrod
31. Welkenbach
32. Wied
33. Winkelbach
