= Astert =

- Municipality
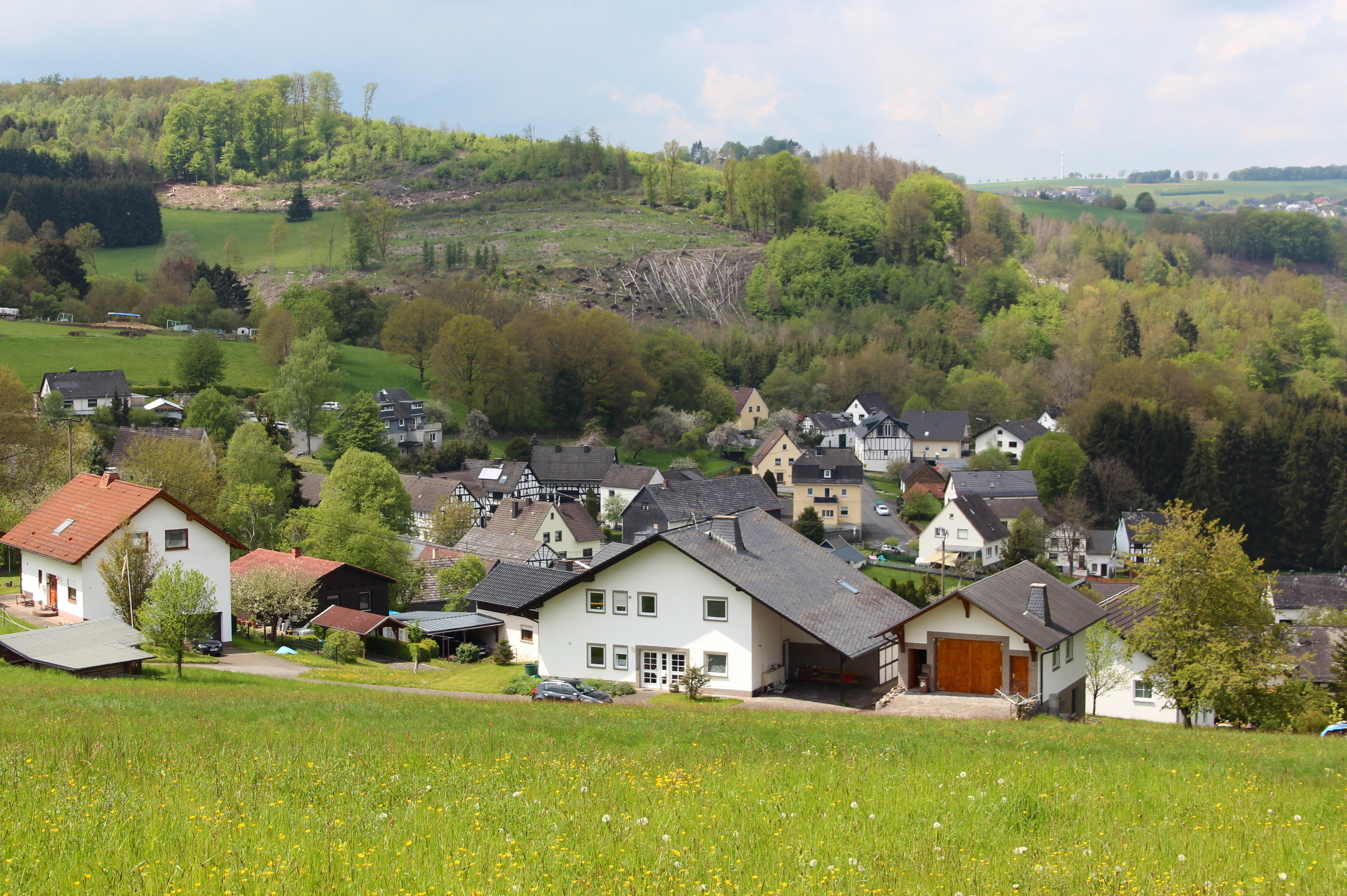

- Coat of arms

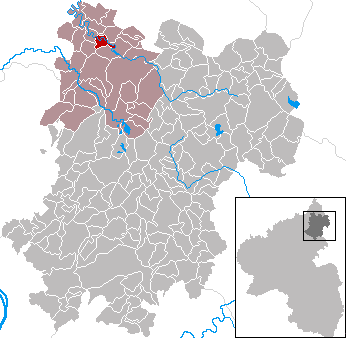
- Location of Astert within Westerwaldkreis district
- Interactive map of Astert
- Location within Germany Location within Rhineland-Palatinate
- Coordinates: 50°41′42″N 7°46′42″E
- Country: Germany
- State: Rhineland-Palatinate
- District: Westerwaldkreis
- Municipal assoc.: Hachenburg
- Subdivisions: 2

Government
  - Mayor (2019–24): Erich Wagner

Area
  - Total: 2.39 km^{2} (0.92 sq mi)
- Elevation: 235 m (771 ft)

Population (2025-12-31)
  - Total: 261
  - Density: 109/km^{2} (283/sq mi)
- Time zone: UTC+01:00 (CET)
  - Summer (DST): UTC+02:00 (CEST)
- Postal codes: 57627
- Dialling codes: 02688
- Vehicle registration: WW
- Website: www.astert.de

Astert is an Ortsgemeinde – a municipality belonging to a Verbandsgemeinde – in the Westerwaldkreis in Rhineland-Palatinate, Germany.

== Geography ==
=== Location ===
The municipality lies in the Westerwald between Limburg and Siegen in the Kroppacher Schweiz (“Kroppach Switzerland”), a nature and landscape conservation area. Through the municipality flows the river Große Nister. In 1985, Astert was chosen as Rhineland-Palatinate's prettiest place in the contest Unser Dorf soll schöner werden (“Our village should become lovelier”). Astert belongs to the Verbandsgemeinde of Hachenburg, a kind of collective municipality. Its seat is in the like-named town.

=== Constituent communities ===
Astert's Ortsteile are Oberdorf and Unterdorf.

== History ==
In 1282, Astert had its first documentary mention in a document from the Marienstatt Monastery, in which it was named as Asterode.

Statistik zur Einwohnerentwicklung

- 1815 – 152
- 1835 – 150
- 1871 – 175
- 1905 – 200
- 1939 – 225
- 1950 – 220
- 1961 – 199
- 1970 – 206
- 1987 – 214
- 2005 – 249

== Politics ==
The municipal council is made up of 8 council members who were elected in a majority vote in a municipal election on 7 June 2009.

== Regular events ==
In this small but lively municipality, village festivals can be enjoyed almost every month. The raising of the Maypole and Carnival, roo, are times when both old and young inhabitants can celebrate together. The municipality's youth, who are not very strongly represented, like to gather at the Backes (an old baking house).

=== Culinary specialities ===
Moreover, there is something else that sets Astert apart, its speciality. It is known as Asterter Klüsen – a regional word for dumplings. They are a well loved dish not only among the locals, but also for people from the neighbouring communities, who enjoy this hearty dish. The dumplings’ recipe and preparation, however, are things that only longtime village ladies may know. The art of cooking the Asterter Klüsen, though, is taught younger ladies so that this delight does not pass away into legend.

== Economy and infrastructure ==
South of the municipality runs Bundesstraße 414, which leads from Altenkirchen to Hachenburg. The nearest Autobahn interchanges are in Siegen and Wilsdorf on the A 45 (Dortmund–Gießen), roughly 25 km away. The nearest InterCityExpress stop lies about 40 km away at the railway station at Montabaur on the Cologne-Frankfurt high-speed rail line.
