= Hohenroth =

- Municipality
- Church of the Nativity of the Virgin Mary

- Coat of arms

- Location of Hohenroth within Rhön-Grabfeld district
- Interactive map of Hohenroth
- Location within Germany Location within Bavaria
- Coordinates: 50°19′N 10°11′E
- Country: Germany
- State: Bavaria
- Admin. region: Unterfranken
- District: Rhön-Grabfeld
- Municipal assoc.: Bad Neustadt an der Saale

Government
  - Mayor (2020–26): Georg Straub

Area
  - Total: 17.14 km^{2} (6.62 sq mi)
- Elevation: 273–302 m (896–991 ft)

Population (2025-12-31)
  - Total: 3,555
  - Density: 207.4/km^{2} (537.2/sq mi)
- Time zone: UTC+01:00 (CET)
  - Summer (DST): UTC+02:00 (CEST)
- Postal codes: 97618
- Dialling codes: 09771
- Vehicle registration: NES
- Website: www.hohenroth.de

Hohenroth is a municipality in the district of Rhön-Grabfeld in Bavaria in Germany.
