= Dierdorf =

- Town
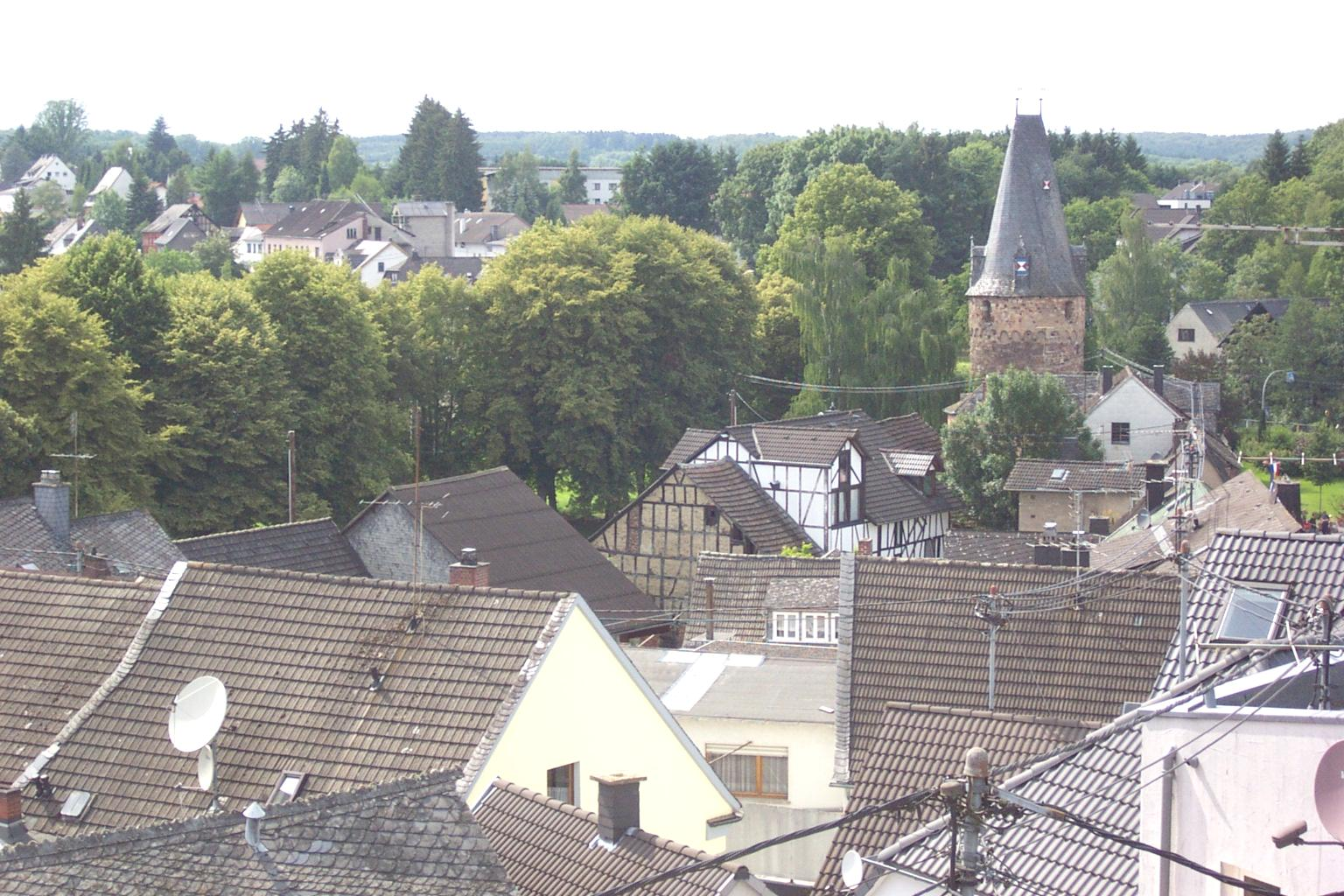

- Coat of arms

- Location of Dierdorf within Neuwied district
- Interactive map of Dierdorf
- Location within Germany Location within Rhineland-Palatinate
- Coordinates: 50°32′56″N 7°39′34″E
- Country: Germany
- State: Rhineland-Palatinate
- District: Neuwied
- Municipal assoc.: Dierdorf
- Subdivisions: 5

Government
  - Mayor (2024–29): Ulrich Schreiber

Area
  - Total: 31.98 km^{2} (12.35 sq mi)
- Elevation: 240 m (790 ft)

Population (2025-12-31)
  - Total: 6,162
  - Density: 192.7/km^{2} (499.0/sq mi)
- Time zone: UTC+01:00 (CET)
  - Summer (DST): UTC+02:00 (CEST)
- Postal codes: 56269
- Dialling codes: 02689
- Vehicle registration: NR
- Website: www.dierdorf.de

Dierdorf (German pronunciation: [ˈdiːɐ̯dɔʁf]) is a town in the district of Neuwied, in Rhineland-Palatinate, Germany. It is situated in the Westerwald, approx. 20 km northeast of Neuwied, and 20 km north of Koblenz.

From the end of the 17th century until 1824, it was the seat of the counts and princes of Wied-Runkel, who resided at Dierdorf Castle, which was demolished in 1902.

Dierdorf is the seat of the Verbandsgemeinde ("collective municipality") Dierdorf.

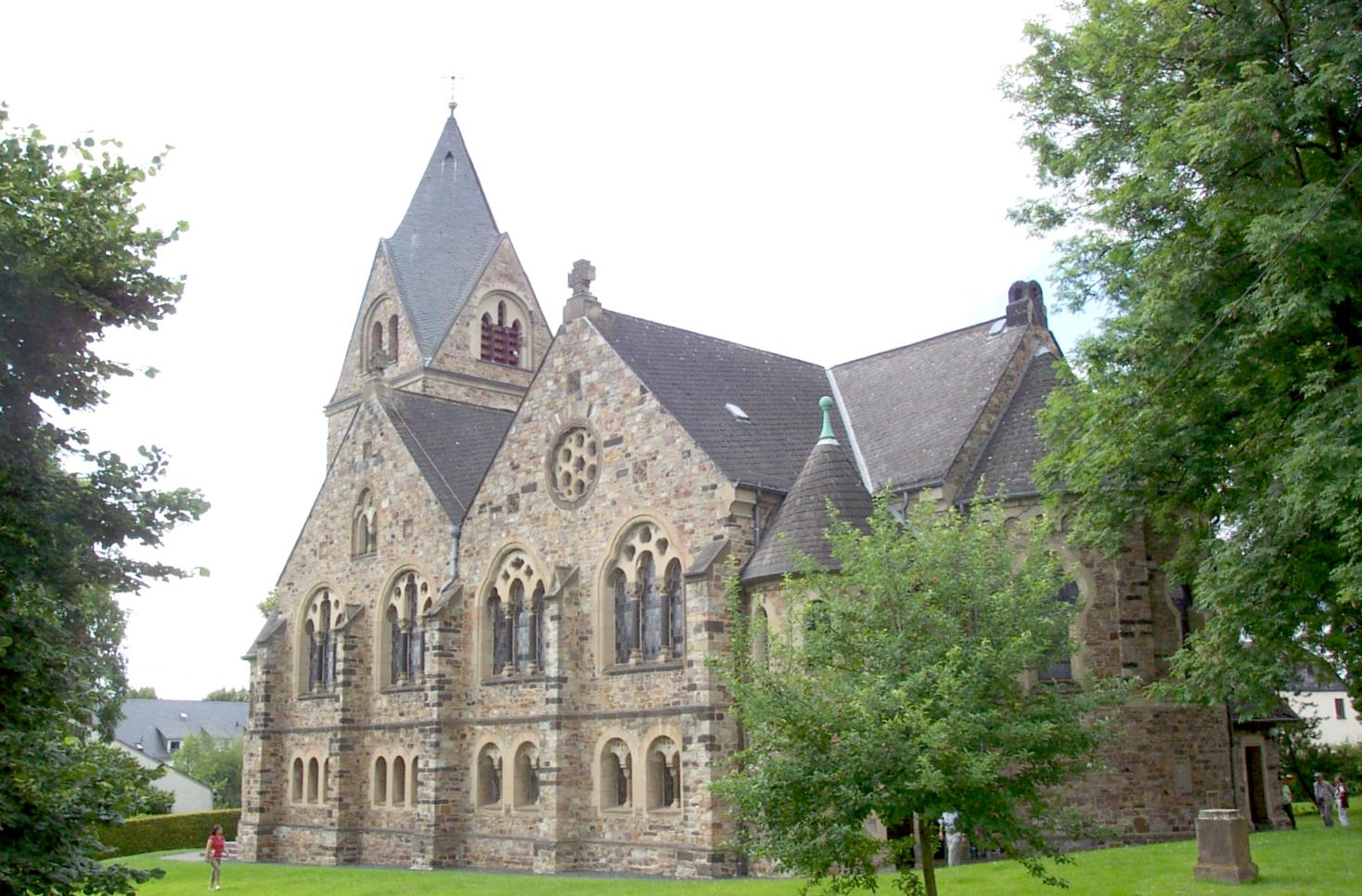
Dierdorf Protestant church

== Local council ==
The elections in May 2014 showed the following results.

Election	SPD	CDU	FDP	Free Voters	Total
2014	6	12	2	2	22 Seats
2009	8	9	3	2	22 Seats

== Sister city ==
Dierdorf is the sister city of Fountain Hills (USA), Courtisols (France) and Krotoszyn (Poland).

== Sons and daughters of the town ==
- Eva Grebel (born 1966), astronomer, professor at the Center for Astronomy at the University of Heidelberg
- Juan Holgado (born 1968), Spanish archer (Olympic champion 1992)
- Samir El-Assal (born 1966), C.E.O of Frank GmbH

== Transport ==
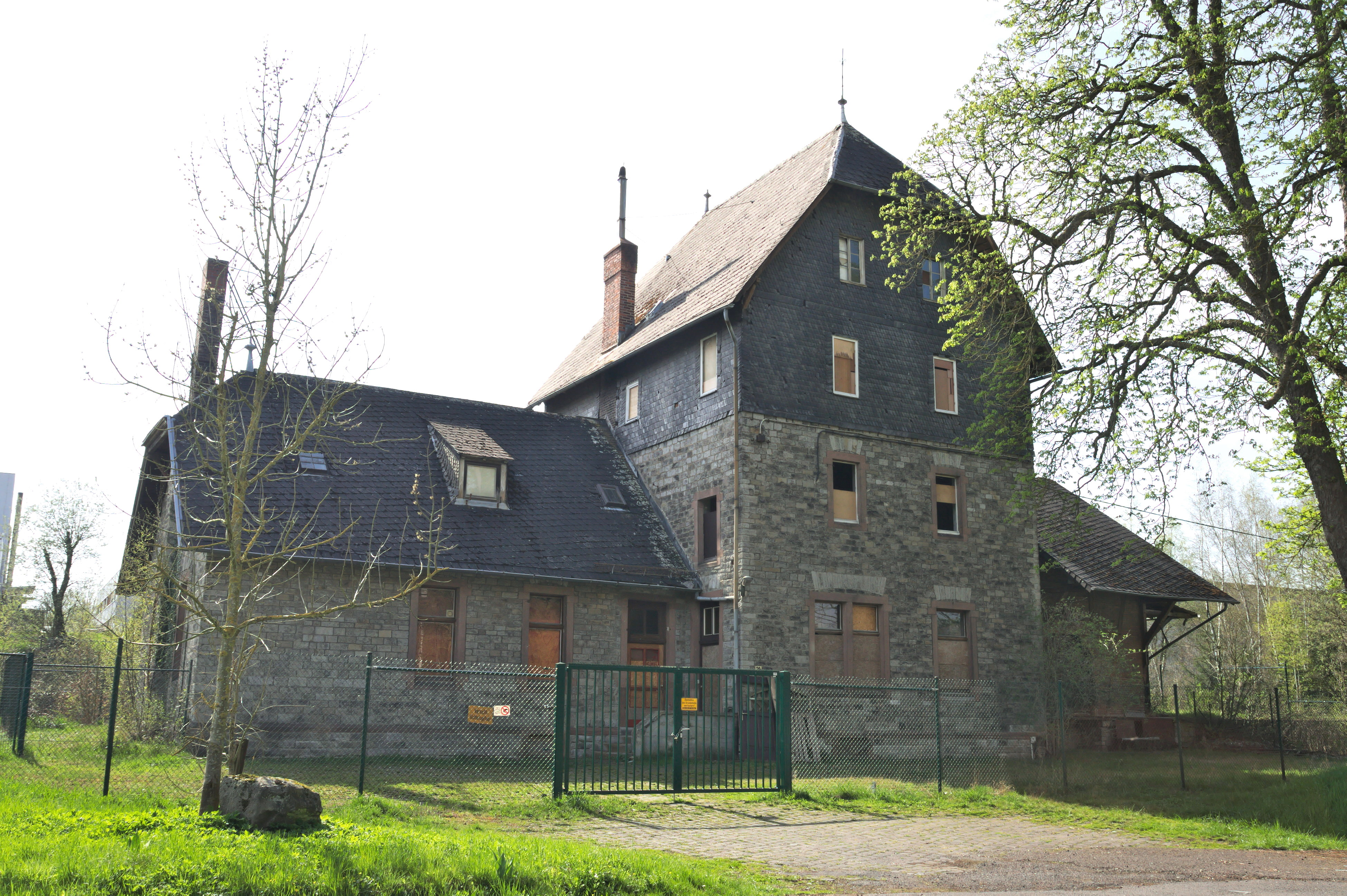
Former Dierdorf train station

Dierdorf had a train station on the Engers-Au railway line, the section from Siershahn to Altenkirchen nowadays is only served by fright trains, nearest train station nowadays is Siershahn.
