= List of municipal flags of Western Germany =

This page lists the municipal flags of Western Germany. It is a part of the Lists of German municipal flags, which is split into regions due to its size.

== Index by state ==
Click the states to browse the municipal flags

== North Rhine-Westphalia ==
=== Cities ===
Municipality	Flag	Coat of arms	Enactment Date	Description	Ref.
Aachen			16th century	A black-yellow horizontal striped flag. The coats of arms has a black eagle on a gold background in its coat of arms to represent its connection to other cities in the imperial era.	
Bergisch Gladbach			6 April 1977	A green-white horizontal striped flag with the coat of arms. A variant of the flag consist of two green stripes on the top and bottom with a white stripe in the middle. The coat of arms features the Bergische Lion. It is the heraldic animal of the county or the duchy of Berg, which had possessions in the area very early on. He was also seen in the old Bergisch Gladbach coat of arms. The deer head is taken from the old Bensberg coat of arms and is intended to point to the forest, which played an important role in Bensberg throughout history. The changing centre beam, taken from the historical coat of arms of the Counts of Berg, is intended to point to the Bergisches Land and connect the symbols of both cities. It was also already depicted in the old Bergisch Gladbach coat of arms.	

Bielefeld

Bielefeld (variant)

Bochum

Bochum (variant)

Bonn

Bottrop

Bottrop (variant)

Cologne

Cologne (variant)

Dortmund

Dortmund (variant)

Duisburg

Duisburg (variant)

Düsseldorf

Düsseldorf (variant)

Essen

Essen (variant)

Gelsenkirchen

Gütersloh

Gütersloh (variant)

Hagen

Hamm

Hamm (variant)

Herne

Krefeld

Krefeld (variant)

Leverkusen

Leverkusen (variant)

Moers

Mönchengladbach

Mönchengladbach (variant)

Mülheim

Mülheim (variant)

Münster

Münster (variant 1)

Münster (variant 2)

Neuss

Neuss (variant)

Oberhausen

Oberhausen (variant)

Paderborn

Paderborn (variant)

Recklinghausen

Recklinghausen (variant)

Remscheid

Remscheid (variant)

Siegen

Siegen (variant)

Solingen

Solingen (variant)

Wuppertal

Wuppertal (variant)

=== Communities ===
Alst

=== Towns and villages ===
Ahaus

Ahlen

Aldenhoven

Alfter

Alpen

Alsdorf

Altena

Altena (variant)

Altenbeken

Altenberge

Altenberge (variant)

Anröchte

Anröchte (variant)

Arnsberg

Arnsberg (variant)

Ascheberg

Attendorn

Augustdorf

Augustdorf (variant)

Bad Berleburg

Bad Driburg

Bad Honnef

Bad Laasphe

Bad Laasphe (variant)

Bad Lippspringe

Bad Münstereifel

Bad Münstereifel (variant)

Bad Oeynhausen

Bad Oeynhausen (variant)

Bad Salzuflen

Bad Salzuflen (variant)

Bad Sassendorf

Bad Wünnenberg

Bad Wünnenberg (variant)

Baesweiler

Baesweiler (variant)

Balve

Balve (variant)

Barntrup

Barntrup (variant)

Beckum

Beckum (variant)

Bedburg

Bedburg (variant)

Bedburg-Hau

Beelen

Beelen (variant)

Bergheim

Bergheim (variant)

Bergkamen

Bergkamen (variant)

Bergneustadt

Bergneustadt (variant)

Bestwig

Beverungen

Billerbeck

Billerbeck (variant)

Blankenheim

Blomberg

Blomberg (variant)

Bocholt

Bocholt (variant)

Bönen

Bönen (variant)

Borchen

Borchen (variant)

Borgentreich

Borgentreich (variant)

Borgholzhausen

Borken

Bornheim

Brakel

Brakel (variant)

Breckerfeld

Breckerfeld (variant)

Brilon

Brüggen

Brühl

Brühl (variant)

Bünde

Bünde (variant)

Burbach

Büren

Büren (variant)

Burscheid

Burscheid (variant)

Castrop-Rauxel

Castrop-Rauxel (variant)

Coesfeld

Dahlem

Dahlem (variant)

Datteln

Datteln (variant)

Delbrück

Detmold

Detmold (variant)

Dinslaken

Dinslaken (variant)

Dörentrup

Dörentrup (variant)

Dormagen

Dormagen (variant)

Dorsten

Drensteinfurt

Drensteinfurt (variant)

Drolshagen

Dülmen

Dülmen (variant)

Düren

Düren (variant)

Eitorf

Elsdorf

Emmerich am Rhein

Emmerich am Rhein (variant)

Emsdetten

Engelskirchen

Engelskirchen (variant)

Enger

Enger (variant)

Ennepetal

Ennepetal (variant)

Ennigerloh

Ennigerloh (variant)

Ense

Ense (variant)

Erftstadt

Erftstadt (variant)

Erkelenz

Erkelenz (variant)

Erkrath

Erkrath (variant)

Erndtebrück

Erwitte

Erwitte (variant)

Eschweiler

Eschweiler (variant)

Eslohe

Espelkamp

Euskirchen

Euskirchen (variant)

Everswinkel

Everswinkel (variant)

Extertal

Extertal (variant)

Finnentrop

Finnentrop (variant)

Frechen

Frechen (variant)

Freudenberg

Fröndenberg

Fröndenberg (variant)

Gangelt

Geilenkirchen

Geldern

Geldern (variant)

Gescher

Geseke

Geseke (variant)

Gevelsberg

Gevelsberg (variant)

Gladbeck

Gladbeck (variant)

Goch

Grefrath

Greven

Grevenbroich

Grevenbroich (variant)

Gronau

Gronau (variant)

Gummersbach

Gummersbach (variant)

Haan

Halle

Halle (variant)

Haltern am See

Harsewinkel

Harsewinkel (variant)

Haan

Hallenberg

Halver

Halver (variant)

Hamminkeln

Hattingen

Hattingen (variant)

Havixbeck

Heek

Heek (variant)

Heiden

Heiden (variant)

Heiligenhaus

Heimbach

Heimbach (variant)

Heinsberg

Hellenthal

Hellenthal (variant)

Hemer

Hennef

Hennef (variant)

Herdecke

Herdecke (variant)

Herford

Herford (variant)

Herscheid

Herten

Herzebrock-Clarholz

Herzebrock-Clarholz (variant)

Herzogenrath

Herzogenrath (variant)

Hilchenbach

Hiddenhausen

Hiddenhausen (variant)

Hilden

Hille

Hille (variant)

Hopsten

Hopsten (variant)

Hörstel

Hörstel (variant)

Holzwickede

Holzwickede (variant)

Horn-Bad Meinberg

Horn-Bad Meinberg (variant)

Horstmar

Horstmar (variant)

Hövelhof

Höxter

Höxter (variant)

Hückelhoven

Hückeswagen

Hückeswagen (variant)

Hüllhorst

Hünxe

Hünxe (variant)

Hürtgenwald

Hürth

Hürth (variant)

Ibbenbüren

Ibbenbüren (variant)

Inden

Iserlohn

Iserlohn (variant)

Isselburg

Isselburg (variant)

Issum

Jüchen

Jüchen (variant)

Jülich

Jülich (variant)

Kaarst

Kalkar

Kall

Kalletal

Kalletal (variant)

Kamen

Kamen (variant)

Kamp-Lintfort

Kamp-Lintfort (variant)

Kempen

Kerken

Kerken (variant)

Kerpen

Kerpen (variant)

Kevelaer

Kevelaer (variant)

Kierspe

Kirchlengern

Kirchhundem

Kleve

Kleve (variant)

Königswinter

Königswinter (variant)

Korschenbroich

Korschenbroich (variant)

Kranenburg

Kreuzau

Kreuztal

Kreuztal (variant)

Kürten

Kürten (variant)

Ladbergen

Laer

Laer (variant)

Lage

Langenberg

Langenberg (variant)

Langenfeld

Legden

Legden (variant)

Leichlingen

Leichlingen (variant)

Lemgo

Lemgo (variant)

Lengerich

Lengerich (variant)

Langerwehe

Lennestadt

Leopoldshöhe

Leopoldshöhe (variant)

Lichtenau

Lichtenau (variant)

Lienen

Lienen (variant)

Lindlar

Lindlar (variant)

Linnich

Linnich (variant)

Lippetal

Lippstadt

Lippstadt (variant 1)

Lippstadt (variant 2)

Lippstadt (variant 3)

Lohmar

Lohmar (variant)

Löhne

Löhne (variant)

Lotte

Lotte (variant)

Lübbecke

Lübbecke (variant)

Lüdenscheid

Lüdinghausen

Lüdinghausen (variant)

Lügde

Lügde (variant)

Lünen

Marienheide

Marienmünster

Marienmünster (variant)

Marl

Marl (variant)

Marsberg

Marsberg (variant)

Mechernich

Meckenheim

Medebach

Meerbusch

Meerbusch (variant)

Meinerzhagen

Menden

Menden (variant)

Merzenich

Meschede

Meschede (variant)

Metelen

Mettingen

Mettmann

Mettmann (variant)

Minden

Minden (variant)

Möhnesee

Möhnesee (variant)

Monheim am Rhein

Monschau

Monschau (variant)

Morsbach

Much

Much (variant)

Nachrodt-Wiblingwerde

Nachrodt-Wiblingwerde (variant)

Netphen

Nettersheim

Nettersheim (variant 1)

Nettersheim (variant 2)

Nettetal

Neuenkirchen

Neuenrade

Neuenrade (variant)

Neukirchen-Vluyn

Neunkirchen

Neunkirchen-Seelscheid

Niederkrüchten

Niederzier

Niederzier (variant)

Nieheim

Nieheim (variant)

Nideggen

Niederkassel

Niederkassel (variant)

Nordkirchen

Nordkirchen (variant)

Nordwalde

Nörvenich

Nottuln

Nottuln (variant)

Nümbrecht

Nümbrecht (variant)

Ochtrup

Ochtrup (variant)

Odenthal

Oelde

Oelde (variant)

Oer-Erkenschwick

Oerlinghausen

Oerlinghausen (variant)

Olfen

Olpe

Olsberg

Olsberg (variant)

Ostbevern

Ostbevern (variant)

Overath

Petershagen

Petershagen (variant)

Plettenberg

Porta Westfalica

Porta Westfalica (variant)

Preußisch Oldendorf

Preußisch Oldendorf (variant)

Pulheim

Radevormwald

Radevormwald (variant)

Raesfeld

Raesfeld (variant)

Rahden

Rahden (variant)

Ratingen

Recke

Rees

Rees (variant)

Reichshof

Reken

Rheda-Wiedenbrück

Rheda-Wiedenbrück (variant)

Rhede

Rhede (variant)

Rheinbach

Rheinbach (variant)

Rheinberg

Rheinberg (variant)

Rheine

Rheine (variant)

Rheurdt

Rietberg

Rietberg (variant)

Rödinghausen

Rödinghausen (variant)

Roetgen

Rommerskirchen

Rommerskirchen (variant)

Rosendahl

Rosendahl (variant)

Rösrath

Rösrath (variant)

Ruppichteroth

Rüthen

Rüthen (variant)

Saerbeck

Salzkotten

Salzkotten (variant)

Sankt Augustin

Sankt Augustin (variant)

Sassenberg

Sassenberg (variant)

Schalksmühle

Schalksmühle (variant)

Schermbeck

Schleiden

Schleiden (variant)

Schieder-Schwalenberg

Schieder-Schwalenberg (variant)

Schlangen

Schlangen (variant)

Schloß Holte-Stukenbrock

Schloß Holte-Stukenbrock (variant)

Schmallenberg

Schöppingen

Schöppingen (variant)

Schwalmtal

Schwelm

Schwelm (variant)

Schwerte

Schwerte (variant)

Selfkant

Selfkant (variant)

Selm

Selm (variant)

Senden

Sendenhorst

Sendenhorst (variant)

Siegburg

Simmerath

Simmerath (variant)

Sonsbeck

Soest

Spenge

Spenge (variant)

Sprockhövel

Sprockhövel (variant)

Stadtlohn

Stadtlohn (variant)

Steinfurt

Steinfurt (variant)

Steinhagen

Steinheim

Stemwede

Stemwede (variant)

Stolberg

Stolberg (variant)

Straelen

Straelen (variant)

Südlohn

Südlohn (variant)

Sundern

Swisttal

Tecklenburg

Tecklenburg (variant)

Telgte

Telgte (variant)

Titz

Tönisvorst

Tönisvorst (variant)

Troisdorf

Troisdorf (variant)

Übach-Palenberg

Übach-Palenberg (variant)

Uedem

Uedem (variant)

Unna

Unna (variant)

Velbert

Velbert (variant)

Velen

Velen (variant)

Verl

Verl (variant)

Versmold

Versmold (variant)

Vettweiß

Viersen

Viersen (variant)

Vlotho

Vlotho (variant)

Voerde

Vreden

Vreden (variant)

Wachtberg

Wachtendonk

Wachtendonk (variant)

Wadersloh

Waldbröl

Waldbröl (variant)

Waldfeucht

Waldfeucht (variant)

Waltrop

Waltrop (variant)

Warburg

Warburg (variant)

Warendorf

Warendorf (variant)

Warstein

Wassenberg

Wassenberg (variant)

Weeze

Weeze (variant)

Wegberg

Wegberg (variant)

Weilerswist

Welver

Wenden

Werdohl

Werdohl (variant)

Werl

Wermelskirchen

Wermelskirchen (variant)

Werne

Werne (variant)

Werther

Werther (variant)

Wesel

Wesseling

Wesseling (variant)

Westerkappeln

Westerkappeln (variant)

Wetter

Wetter (variant)

Wettringen

Wickede

Wiehl

Wiehl (variant)

Willich

Willich (variant)

Willebadessen

Wilnsdorf

Windeck

Winterberg

Wipperfürth

Wipperfürth (variant)

Witten

Witten (variant)

Wülfrath

Wülfrath (variant)

Würselen

Xanten

Xanten (variant)

Zülpich

=== Historical ===
Amt Duisdorf

Aldenhoven

Anröchte

Anröchte (variant)

Ascheberg

Bad Fredeburg

Bad Godesberg

Bad Godesberg (variant)

Beringhausen

Beuel

Beuel (variant)

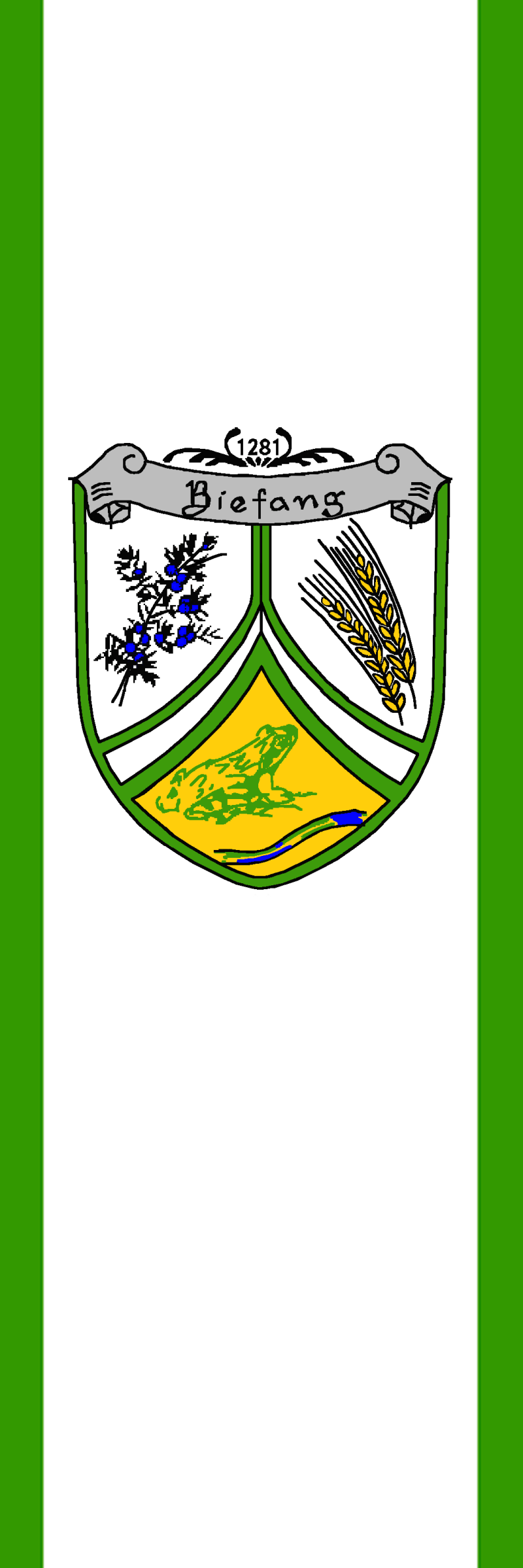
Biefang

Bonn (1792–1969)

Bonn (1792–1969; variant)

Borntosten

Bredelar

Dorp

Dorp (variant)

Eversberg

Freienohl

Giershagen

Haldern

Haldern (variant)

Hamborn

Homberg

Homberg (variant)

Horneburg

Horneburg (variant)

Kettwig

Levern

Meiderich

Niedermarsberg

Obermarsberg

Oesdorf

Rheinhausen

Rheinhausen (variant)

Padberg

Rheydt

Rheydt (variant)

Ruhrort

Rumeln-Kaldenhausen

Rumeln-Kaldenhausen (variant)

Seppenrade

Seppenrade (variant)

Steele

Störmede

Walsum

Wattenscheid

Wattenscheid (variant)

Westfeld

Werden

Witzhelden

== Rhineland-Palatinate ==
=== Cities ===
Adenau

Alzey

Andernach

Bad Dürkheim

Bad Kreuznach

Bad Neuenahr-Ahrweiler

Bendorf

Bingen am Rhein

Bitburg

Bitburg (variant)

Boppard

Frankenthal

Frankenthal (variant)

Germersheim

Germersheim (variant)

Grünstadt

Idar-Oberstein

Ingelheim am Rhein

Ingelheim am Rhein (variant)

Kaiserslautern

Koblenz

Koblenz (variant 1)

Koblenz (variant 2)

Lahnstein

Lahnstein (variant)

Landau

Landau (variant)

Ludwigshafen

Ludwigshafen (variant)

Mainz

Mainz (variant 1)

Mainz (variant 2)

Mainz (variant 3)

Mayen

Neustadt an der Weinstraße

Neuwied

Pirmasens

Remagen

Remagen (variant)

Schifferstadt

Sinzig

Sinzig (variant)

Speyer

Trier

Trier (variant)

Wittlich

Worms

Wörth am Rhein

Zweibrücken

=== Towns and villages ===
Aach

Abentheuer

Abtweiler

Acht

Achtelsbach

Adenbach

Adenau

Affler

Ahrbrück

Ailertchen

Albersweiler

Albessen

Albig

Albisheim

Alf

Alflen

Alken

Allenbach

Allendorf

Allenfeld

Almersbach

Alpenrod

Alsbach

Alsdorf, Bitburg-Prüm

Alsdorf, Altenkirchen

Alsenz

Alsheim

Altdorf

Altdorf (variant)

Altenahr

Altenbamberg

Altendiez

Altenglan

Altenkirchen, Kusel

Altenkirchen

Alterkülz

Althornbach

Altlay

Altleiningen

Altrich

Altrip

Altscheid

Altstrimmig

Altweidelbach

Ammeldingen an der Our

Ammeldingen bei Neuerburg

Anhausen

Annweiler am Trifels

Anschau

Antweiler

Appenheim

Arbach

Aremberg

Arenrath

Arft

Argenschwang

Argenthal

Armsheim

Arnshöfen

Arzbach

Arzfeld

Asbach, Birkenfeld

Asbach (Westerwald)

Aschbach

Aspisheim

Astert

Attenhausen

Atzelgift

Auderath

Auel

Auen

Aull

Auw an der Kyll

Auw bei Prüm

Ayl

Baar

Bacharach

Bachenberg

Bad Bergzabern

Bad Bertrich

Bad Breisig

Bad Ems

Bad Hönningen

Bad Marienberg

Bad Sobernheim

Badem

Badenhard

Badenheim

Baldringen

Balduinstein

Balesfeld

Bann

Bannberscheid

Barbelroth

Bärenbach, Bad Kreuznach

Bärenbach, Rhein-Hunsrück

Barweiler

Bärweiler

Basberg

Bassenheim

Battenberg

Battweiler

Bauler, Ahrweiler

Bauler, Bitburg-Prüm

Baumholder

Bausendorf

Baustert

Bayerfeld-Steckweiler

Becheln

Bechenheim

Becherbach (Bad Kreuznach)

Becherbach bei Kirn

Bechhofen

Bechtheim

Bechtolsheim

Bedesbach

Beilingen

Beilstein

Beindersheim

Beinhausen

Bekond

Belg

Belgweiler

Bell, Mayen-Koblenz

Bell, Rhein-Hunsrück

Bellheim

Bellheim (variant)

Bellingen

Beltheim

Bengel (Mosel)

Bennhausen

Benzweiler

Bereborn

Berenbach

Berg, Ahrweiler

Berg, Germersheim

Berg, Rhein-Lahn

Bergen

Bergenhausen

Berghausen

Berglangenbach

Berglicht

Bergweiler

Berkoth

Berlingen

Bermel

Bermersheim

Bermersheim vor der Höhe

Berndorf

Berndroth

Bernkastel-Kues

Berod bei Hachenburg

Berod bei Wallmerod

Berscheid

Berschweiler bei Baumholder

Berschweiler bei Kirn

Betzdorf

Berzhahn

Berzhausen

Bescheid

Betteldorf

Bettendorf

Bettenfeld

Bettingen

Beulich

Beuren, Cochem-Zell

Beuren, Trier-Saarburg

Bickenbach

Bickendorf

Biebelnheim

Biebelsheim

Biebern

Biebrich

Biedershausen

Biedesheim

Biersdorf am See

Biesdorf

Bilkheim

Billigheim-Ingenheim

Binningen

Binsfeld

Birgel

Birkenbeul

Birkenfeld

Birkenheide

Birken-Honigsessen

Birkenhördt

Birkheim

Birkweiler

Birlenbach

Birnbach

Birresborn

Birtlingen

Bischheim

Bissersheim

Bisterschied

Bitzen

Blankenrath

Blaubach

Bleckhausen

Bleialf

Bobenheim am Berg

Bobenheim-Roxheim

Bobenthal

Böbingen

Böchingen

Bockenau

Bockenheim an der Weinstraße

Boden

Bodenbach

Bodenheim

Bogel

Böhl-Iggelheim

Bolanden

Bollenbach

Böllenborn

Bollendorf

Bölsberg

Bonefeld

Bonerath

Bongard

Boos, Mayen-Koblenz

Boos, Bad Kreuznach

Börfink

Borler

Bornheim (Pfalz)

Bornheim (Rheinhessen)

Bornich

Borod

Börrstadt

Börsborn

Bosenbach

Bottenbach

Boxberg

Brachbach

Brachtendorf

Brandscheid

Brandscheid, Westerwaldkreis

Braubach

Brauneberg

Braunshorn

Braunweiler

Brauweiler

Brecht

Breit

Breitenau

Breitenbach

Breitenheim

Breitenthal

Breitscheid, Mainz-Bingen

Breitscheid (Westerwald)

Breitscheidt

Bremberg

Bremm

Brenk

Bretthausen

Bretzenheim

Breunigweiler

Brey

Briedel

Brieden

Briedern

Brimingen

Brockscheid

Brodenbach

Brohl

Brohl-Lützing

Bruch

Bruchertseifen

Bruchhausen

Bruchmühlbach-Miesau

Bruchweiler

Bruchweiler-Bärenbach

Brücken, Birkenfeld

Brücken, Kusel

Brücktal

Bruschied

Bruttig-Fankel

Bubach

Bubenheim

Bubenheim

Buborn

Buch, Rhein-Hunsrück

Buch, Rhein-Lahn

Büchel

Büchenbeuren

Buchet

Buchholz, Neuwied

Budenbach

Budenheim

Büdesheim

Büdlich

Buhlenberg

Bullay

Bundenbach

Bundenthal

Burbach

Bürdenbach

Burg, Bitburg-Prüm

Burg, Bernkastel-Wittlich

Burgbrohl

Burgen, Bernkastel-Wittlich

Burgen, Mayen-Koblenz

Burglahr

Burgschwalbach

Burgsponheim

Burrweiler

Burtscheid

Busenberg

Busenhausen

Caan

Callbach

Carlsberg

Charlottenberg

Clausen

Cochem

Contwig

Cramberg

Cronenberg

Daaden

Dachsenhausen

Dackenheim

Dackscheid

Dahlem

Dahlheim

Dahn

Dahnen

Dalberg

Daleiden

Dalheim

Dambach

Damflos

Damscheid

Dankerath

Dannenfels

Dannstadt-Schauernheim

Darscheid

Darstein

Dasburg

Dattenberg

Datzeroth

Daubach

Daubach

Daun

Dausenau

Dauwelshausen

Daxweiler

Dedenbach

Deesen

Deidesheim

Deimberg

Dellfeld

Demerath

Dennweiler-Frohnbach

Densborn

Dernau

Dernbach, Neuwied

Dernbach, Südliche Weinstraße

Dernbach, Westerwaldkreis

Derschen

Desloch

Dessighofen

Detzem

Deudesfeld

Deuselbach

Dexheim

Dhronecken

Dichtelbach

Dickendorf

Dickenschied

Dickesbach

Dieblich

Diefenbach

Dielkirchen

Dienethal

Dienheim

Dienstweiler

Dierbach

Dierdorf

Dierfeld

Dierscheid

Diethardt

Dietrichingen

Diez

Dill

Dillendorf

Dimbach

Dingdorf

Dintesheim

Dirmstein

Ditscheid

Dittelsheim-Heßloch

Dittweiler

Dockendorf

Dockweiler

Dodenburg

Dohm-Lammersdorf

Dohr

Dolgesheim

Dommershausen

Donsieders

Dörnberg

Dorn-Dürkheim

Dornholzhausen

Dörrebach

Dörrenbach

Dörrmoschel

Dörscheid

Dörsdorf

Dorsel

Dorsheim

Dörth

Döttesfeld

Drees

Dreifelden

Dreikirchen

Dreis

Dreisbach

Dreis-Brück

Dreisen

Duchroth

Dudeldorf

Dudenhofen

Dümpelfeld

Dünfus

Düngenheim

Dunzweiler

Duppach

Dürrholz

Ebernhahn

Ebertshausen

Ebertsheim

Echternacherbrück

Echtershausen

Eckelsheim

Eckenroth

Eckersweiler

Eckfeld

Edenkoben

Edesheim

Ediger-Eller

Ehlenz

Ehlscheid

Ehr

Ehweiler

Eich

Eichelhardt

Eichelhardt (variant)

Eichen

Eichenbach

Eilscheid

Eimsheim

Einig

Einöllen

Einselthum

Eisenach

Eisenberg

Eisenschmitt

Eisighofen

Eitelborn

Elben

Elbingen

Elchweiler

Elkenroth

Ellenberg

Ellenhausen

Ellenz-Poltersdorf

Ellern

Ellerstadt

Ellscheid

Ellweiler

Elmstein

Elsoff

Elzweiler

Emmelbaum

Emmelshausen

Emmerzhausen

Endlichhofen

Engelstadt

Enkenbach-Alsenborn

Enkirch

Ensch

Ensheim

Enspel

Enzen

Eppelsheim

Eppenberg

Eppenbrunn

Eppenrod

Erbach

Erbes-Büdesheim

Erden

Erdesbach

Erfweiler

Ergeshausen

Erlenbach bei Dahn

Erlenbach bei Kandel

Ernst

Ernzen

Erpel

Erpolzheim

Ersfeld

Erzenhausen

Esch, Vulkaneifel

Esch, Bernkastel-Wittlich

Eschbach, Rhein-Lahn

Eschbach, Südliche Weinstraße

Eschfeld

Esselborn

Essenheim

Essingen

Eßlingen

Eßweiler

Esthal

Etgert

Etschberg

Etteldorf

Ettinghausen

Ettringen

Etzbach

Eulenberg

Eulenbis

Eulgem

Euscheid

Eußerthal

Ewighausen

Fachbach

Faid

Falkenstein

Farschweiler

Fehl-Ritzhausen

Feilbingert

Feilsdorf

Fell

Fensdorf

Ferschweiler

Feuerscheid

Feusdorf

Fiersbach

Filsen

Filz

Finkenbach-Gersweiler

Fisch

Fischbach bei Dahn

Fischbach

Fischbach

Fischbach-Oberraden

Flacht

Flammersfeld

Flemlingen

Fleringen

Fließem

Flomborn

Flonheim

Flörsheim-Dalsheim

Flußbach

Fluterschen

Föckelberg

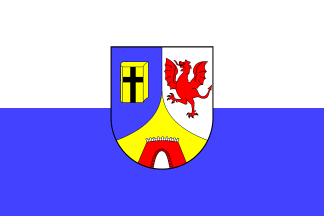
Föhren

Fohren-Linden

Forst an der Weinstraße

Forst, Altenkirchen

Forst (Eifel)

Forst (Hunsrück)

Forstmehren

Framersheim

Frankelbach

Frankeneck

Frankenstein

Frankweiler

Franzenheim

Frauenberg

Freckenfeld

Frei-Laubersheim

Freilingen

Freimersheim, Südliche Weinstraße

Freimersheim

Freinsheim

Freinsheim (variant)

Freirachdorf

Freisbach

Frettenheim

Freudenburg

Friedelsheim

Friedewald

Friesenhagen

Friesenheim

Frohnhofen

Fronhofen

Frücht

Fuchshofen

Fürfeld

Fürthen

Fußgönheim

Gabsheim

Gackenbach

Galenberg

Gamlen

Gappenach

Gau-Algesheim

Gau-Bickelheim

Gau-Bischofsheim

Gauersheim

Gaugrehweiler

Gau-Heppenheim

Gau-Odernheim

Gau-Odernheim (variant)

Gau-Weinheim

Gebhardshain

Gebroth

Gefell

Gehlert

Gehlweiler

Gehrweiler

Geichlingen

Geilnau

Geiselberg

Geisfeld

Geisig

Gelenberg

Gemmerich

Gemünd

Gemünden, Rhein-Hunsrück

Gemünden, Westerwaldkreis

Gensingen

Gentingen

Gerach

Gerbach

Gerhardsbrunn

Gering

Gerolsheim

Gerolstein

Gevenich

Gieleroth

Gielert

Gierschnach

Giershausen

Giesdorf

Giesenhausen

Gillenbeuren

Gillenfeld

Gilzem

Gindorf

Gimbweiler

Ginsweiler

Gipperath

Girkenroth

Girod

Gladbach

Glanbrücken

Glan-Münchweiler

Gless

Gleisweiler

Gleiszellen-Gleishorbach

Göcklingen

Goddert

Gödenroth

Gollenberg

Göllheim

Gommersheim

Gonbach

Gondenbrett

Gondershausen

Gondorf

Gönnersdorf

Gönnersdorf

Gönnheim

Görgeshausen

Gornhausen

Gösenroth

Gossersweiler-Stein

Graach an der Mosel

Gräfendhron

Grafschaft

Gransdorf

Greimerath

Greimerath

Greimersburg

Grenderich

Griebelschied

Gries

Grimburg

Grolsheim

Großbundenbach

Großfischlingen

Großholbach

Großkampenberg

Großkarlbach

Großlangenfeld

Großlittgen

Großmaischeid

Großniedesheim

Großseifen

Großsteinhausen

Grumbach

Grünebach

Guckheim

Gückingen

Guldental

Güllesheim

Gumbsheim

Gunderath

Gundersheim

Gundersweiler

Gundheim

Guntersblum

Gusenburg

Gusterath

Gutenacker

Gutenberg

Gutweiler

Hachenburg

Hagenbach

Hahn

Hahnenbach

Hahnheim

Hahnstätten

Hahnweiler

Hainau

Hainfeld

Halbs

Hallgarten

Hallschlag

Halsdorf

Halsenbach

Hambach

Hambuch

Hamm am Rhein

Hamm, Bitburg-Prüm

Hamm (Sieg)

Hammerstein

Hangen-Weisheim

Hanhofen

Hanroth

Harbach

Hardert

Hardt

Hargarten

Hargesheim

Harschbach

Harscheid

Harspelt

Haßloch

Hartenfels

Harthausen

Härtlingen

Harxheim

Hasborn

Haschbach am Remigiusberg

Haserich

Hasselbach, Rhein-Hunsrück

Hasselbach, Altenkirchen

Hattert

Hattgenstein

Hatzenbühl

Hatzenport

Hauenstein

Hauptstuhl

Hauroth

Hausbay

Hausen, Birkenfeld

Hausen (Wied)

Hausten

Hausweiler

Hecken

Heckenbach

Heckenmünster

Heckhuscheid

Heddert

Hefersweiler

Heidenburg

Heidweiler

Heilbach

Heilberscheid

Heilenbach

Heiligenmoschel

Heiligenroth

Heimbach (Nahe)

Heimborn

Heimweiler

Heinzenbach

Heinzenberg

Heinzenhausen

Heisdorf

Heistenbach

Helferskirchen

Hellenhahn-Schellenberg

Hellertshausen

Helmenzen

Helmeroth

Heltersberg

Hemmelzen

Henau

Hennweiler

Henschtal

Hentern

Herborn

Herbstmühle

Herchweiler

Herdorf

Herforst

Hergenfeld

Hergenroth

Hergersweiler

Herl

Hermersberg

Hermeskeil

Herold

Herren-Sulzbach

Herresbach

Herrstein

Herschbach, Selters

Herschbach, Wallmerod

Herschberg

Herschbroich

Herschweiler-Pettersheim

Hersdorf

Herxheim am Berg

Herxheim bei Landau/Pfalz

Herxheimweyher

Herzfeld

Heßheim

Hesweiler

Hettenhausen

Hettenleidelheim

Hettenrodt

Hetzerath

Heuchelheim bei Frankenthal

Heuchelheim-Klingen

Heupelzen

Heuzert

Hilgenroth

Hilgert

Hillesheim, Mainz-Bingen

Hillesheim

Hillscheid

Hilscheid

Hilst

Himmighofen

Hintertiefenbach

Hinterweidenthal

Hinterweiler

Hinzenburg

Hinzert-Pölert

Hinzweiler

Hirschberg

Hirschfeld

Hirschhorn

Hirschthal

Hirten

Hirz-Maulsbach

Hochborn

Hochdorf-Assenheim

Hochscheid

Hochspeyer

Hochstadt

Hochstätten

Höchstberg

Höchstenbach

Hochstetten-Dhaun

Hockweiler

Hof

Hoffeld

Höheinöd

Höheischweiler

Hohenfels-Essingen

Hohenleimbach

Hohenöllen

Hohen-Sülzen

Höhfröschen

Höhn

Höhr-Grenzhausen

Holler

Hollnich

Holsthum

Holzappel

Holzbach

Holzerath

Holzhausen an der Haide

Holzheim

Homberg, Kusel

Homberg, Westerwaldkreis

Hömberg

Hommerdingen

Honerath

Hönningen

Hontheim

Hoppstädten

Hoppstädten-Weiersbach

Horath

Horbach

Horbach, Südwestpfalz

Horbach, Westerwaldkreis

Horbruch

Hördt

Horhausen, Rhein-Lahn

Horhausen, Altenkirchen

Höringen

Horn

Hornbach

Horperath

Horrweiler

Horschbach

Hörscheid

Hörschhausen

Hosten

Hottenbach

Hövels

Hübingen

Hüblingen

Hüffelsheim

Hüffler

Hümmel

Hümmerich

Hundsangen

Hundsbach

Hundsdorf

Hungenroth

Hunzel

Hupperath

Hütschenhausen

Hütten

Hütterscheid

Hüttingen an der Kyll

Hüttingen bei Lahr

Idelberg

Idenheim

Idesheim

Igel

Ilbesheim

Ilbesheim bei Landau in der Pfalz

Illerich

Immerath

Immert

Immesheim

Impflingen

Imsbach

Imsweiler

Ingelbach

Ingendorf

Insheim

Insul

Ippenschied

Irmenach

Irmtraut

Irrel

Irrhausen

Irsch

Isenburg

Isert

Isselbach

Jakobsweiler

Jeckenbach

Jettenbach

Jockgrim

Jucken

Jugenheim in Rheinhessen

Jünkerath

Kaden

Kadenbach

Kaifenheim

Kail

Kaisersesch

Kalenborn

Kalenborn

Kalenborn-Scheuern

Kalkofen

Kallstadt

Kalt

Kaltenborn

Kaltenengers

Kaltenholzhausen

Kammerforst

Kamp-Bornhofen

Kandel

Kanzem

Kapellen-Drusweiler

Kaperich

Kappel

Kappeln

Kapsweyer

Karbach

Karl

Karlshausen

Kasbach-Ohlenberg

Kaschenbach

Kasdorf

Kasel

Käshofen

Kastel-Staadt

Kastellaun

Katzenbach

Katzweiler

Katzenelnbogen

Katzwinkel, Vulkaneifel

Katzwinkel

Kaub

Kausen

Kehlbach

Kehrig

Keidelheim

Kelberg

Kell am See

Kellenbach

Kemmenau

Kempenich

Kempfeld

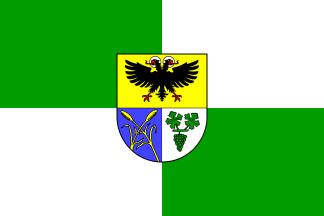
Kenn

Keppeshausen

Kerben

Kerpen

Kerschenbach

Kerzenheim

Kescheid

Kesfeld

Kesseling

Kesten

Kestert

Kettenhausen

Kettenheim

Kettig

Kickeshausen

Kindenheim

Kinderbeuern

Kindsbach

Kinheim

Kinzenburg

Kirburg

Kirchberg

Kircheib

Kirchen

Kirchheim an der Weinstraße

Kirchheimbolanden

Kirchsahr

Kirchwald

Kirchweiler

Kirf

Kirn

Kirrweiler, Kusel

Kirrweiler

Kirsbach

Kirschroth

Kirschweiler

Kisselbach

Klausen

Kleinbundenbach

Kleinfischlingen

Kleinich

Kleinkarlbach

Kleinlangenfeld

Kleinmaischeid

Kleinniedesheim

Kleinsteinhausen

Klein-Winternheim

Kliding

Klingelbach

Klingenmünster

Klosterkumbd

Klotten

Kludenbach

Klüsserath

Knittelsheim

Knittelsheim (variant)

Knopp-Labach

Knöringen

Kobern-Gondorf

Kölbingen

Kollig

Kollweiler

Kolverath

Kommen

Köngernheim

Königsau

Königsfeld

Konken

Konz

Kopp

Körborn

Kordel

Kördorf

Korlingen

Körperich

Korweiler

Kottenborn

Kottenheim

Kötterichen

Kottweiler-Schwanden

Köwerich

Koxhausen

Kraam

Kradenbach

Krähenberg

Kratzenburg

Krautscheid

Kreimbach-Kaulbach

Kretz

Krickenbach

Kriegsfeld

Kronweiler

Kroppach

Kröppen

Krottelbach

Kröv

Kruchten

Kruft

Krümmel

Krummenau

Krunkel

Kuhardt

Kuhnhöfen

Külz

Kümbdchen

Kundert

Kurtscheid

Kusel

Kyllburg

Kyllburgweiler

Lahr, Bitburg-Prüm

Lahr (Hunsrück)

Lambertsberg

Lambrecht

Lambsborn

Lambsheim

Lampaden

Landkern

Landscheid

Landstuhl

Langenbach bei Kirburg

Langenbach, Kusel

Langenfeld, Mayen-Koblenz

Langenhahn

Langenlonsheim

Langenscheid

Langenthal

Langscheid

Langsur

Langweiler

Langweiler

Langwieden

Lascheid

Lasel

Laubach, Cochem-Zell

Laubach, Rhein-Hunsrück

Laubenheim

Laudert

Laufeld

Laufersweiler

Laumersheim

Lauperath

Laurenburg

Lauschied

Lautersheim

Lauterecken

Lautert

Lautzenbrücken

Lautzenhausen

Lehmen

Leidenborn

Leienkaul

Leimbach, Ahrweiler

Leimbach, Bitburg-Prüm

Leimen

Leimersheim

Leiningen

Leinsweiler

Leisel

Leitzweiler

Leiwen

Lemberg

Lettweiler

Leubsdorf

Leuterod

Leutesdorf

Lichtenborn

Liebenscheid

Liebshausen

Lieg

Lierfeld

Lierschied

Liesenich

Lieser

Ließem

Limbach, Bad Kreuznach

Limbach, Westerwaldkreis

Limburgerhof

Lind, Ahrweiler

Lind, Mayen-Koblenz

Linden, Kaiserslautern

Linden, Westerwaldkreis

Lindenberg

Lindenschied

Lingenfeld

Lingerhahn

Linkenbach

Lipporn

Lirstal

Lissendorf

Linz am Rhein

Lochum

Löf

Lohnsfeld

Lohnweiler

Lohrheim

Löllbach

Lollschied

Longen

Longkamp

Longuich

Lonnig

Lonsheim

Lorscheid

Lörzweiler

Lösnich

Lötzbeuren

Luckenbach

Lückenburg

Ludwigshöhe

Ludwigswinkel

Lug

Lünebach

Lustadt

Lütz

Lutzerath

Lützkampen

Luxem

Lykershausen

Macken

Mackenbach

Mackenrodt

Mähren

Maikammer

Maisborn

Maitzborn

Malberg

Malberg

Malbergweich

Malborn

Mammelzen

Mandel

Mandern

Manderscheid, Bitburg-Prüm

Manderscheid

Mannebach

Mannebach

Mannweiler-Cölln

Manubach

Marienfels

Marienhausen

Marienrachdorf

Maring-Noviand

Marnheim

Maroth

Martinshöhe

Martinstein

Marzhausen

Masburg

Maßweiler

Mastershausen

Masthorn

Matzenbach

Matzerath

Mauchenheim

Mauden

Mauel

Mauschbach

Maxdorf

Maxsain

Mayschoß

Meckel

Meckenbach

Meckenbach

Meckenheim

Medard

Meddersheim

Meerfeld

Mehlbach

Mehlingen

Mehren

Mehren

Mehring

Meinborn

Meisburg

Meisenheim

Melsbach

Mendig

Mengerschied

Menningen

Merkelbach

Merlscheid

Mermuth

Merschbach

Mertesdorf

Mertesheim

Mertloch

Merxheim

Merzalben

Merzkirchen

Merzweiler

Mesenich

Messerich

Mettendorf

Mettenheim

Metterich

Mettweiler

Metzenhausen

Meudt

Meuspath

Michelbach

Michelbach, Altenkirchen

Miehlen

Miellen

Minden

Minderlittgen

Minfeld

Minheim

Misselberg

Mittelbrunn

Mittelfischbach

Mittelhof

Mittelreidenbach

Mittelstrimmig

Mogendorf

Molsberg

Mölsheim

Molzhain

Mommenheim

Monreal

Monsheim

Montabaur

Möntenich

Monzelfeld

Monzernheim

Monzingen

Morbach

Moritzheim

Mörlen

Mörsbach

Mörschbach

Morscheid

Morschheim

Mörschied

Mörsdorf

Mörsfeld

Morshausen

Mörstadt

Mosbruch

Moschheim

Moselkern

Mückeln

Müden (Mosel)

Mudenbach

Mudersbach

Mudershausen

Mühlpfad

Mülbach

Mülheim an der Mosel

Mülheim-Kärlich

Müllenbach

Müllenbach, Cochem-Zell

Münchwald

Münchweiler am Klingbach

Münchweiler an der Alsenz

Münchweiler an der Rodalb

Mündersbach

Münk

Münsterappel

Münster-Sarmsheim

Münstermaifeld

Mürlenbach

Müsch

Müschenbach

Musweiler

Mutterschied

Mutterstadt

Mützenich (bei Prüm)

Muxerath

Nachtsheim

Nack

Nackenheim

Nannhausen

Nanzdietschweiler

Nassau

Nastätten

Neuerburg

Nieder-Olm

Nierstein

Obermoschel

Oberwesel

Oppenheim

Osthofen

Otterberg

Polch

Prüm

Ramstein-Miesenbach

Ransbach-Baumbach

Rennerod

Rheinböllen

Rhens

Rockenhausen

Rodalben

Saarburg

Sankt Goar

Sankt Goarshausen

Schweich

Selters

Simmern

Speicher

Stolberg

Stromberg

Traben-Trarbach

Ulmen

Unkel

Vallendar

Wachenheim

Waldmohr

Weißenthurm

Westerburg

Wirges

Wissen

Wolfstein

Wörrstadt

Zell

== Saarland ==
=== Cities ===
Homburg

Merzig

Neunkirchen

Saarbrücken

Saarlouis

Sankt Ingbert

Sankt Wendel

Völklingen

=== Towns and villages ===
Beckingen

Bexbach

Blieskastel

Bous

Dillingen

Ensdorf

Eppelborn

Freisen

Friedrichsthal

Gersheim

Großrosseln

Heusweiler

Illingen

Kirkel

Kleinblittersdorf

Lebach

Losheim am See

Mandelbachtal

Marpingen

Merchweiler

Mettlach

Mettlach (variant)

Nalbach

Namborn

Nohfelden

Nonnweiler

Oberthal

Ottweiler

Perl

Püttlingen

Quierschied

Rehlingen-Siersburg

Riegelsberg

Saarwellingen

Schiffweiler

Schmelz

Schwalbach

Spiesen-Elversberg

Sulzbach

Tholey

Überherrn

Wadern

Wadgassen

Wallerfangen

Weiskirchen

== See also ==
- List of municipal flags of Northern Germany
- List of municipal flags of Central Germany
- List of municipal flags of Eastern Germany
- List of municipal flags of Southern Germany
