= 11th Armored Division (United States) =

- 11th Armored Division shoulder sleeve insignia
- Active: 15 August 1942 – 31 August 1945 (Disbandment)
- Country: United States
- Branch: United States Army
- Type: Armor
- Role: Armored warfare
- Size: Division
- Part of: Third Army
- Garrison/HQ: Camp Polk, Louisiana
- Nickname: "Thunderbolt"
- Motto: J'Avance (I Advance)
- Engagements: World War II; Rhineland; Ardennes-Alsace; Central Europe

Commanders
- Notable commanders: Major General Edward H. Brooks; Brigadier General Charles S. Kilburn

Insignia
- Distinctive unit insignia

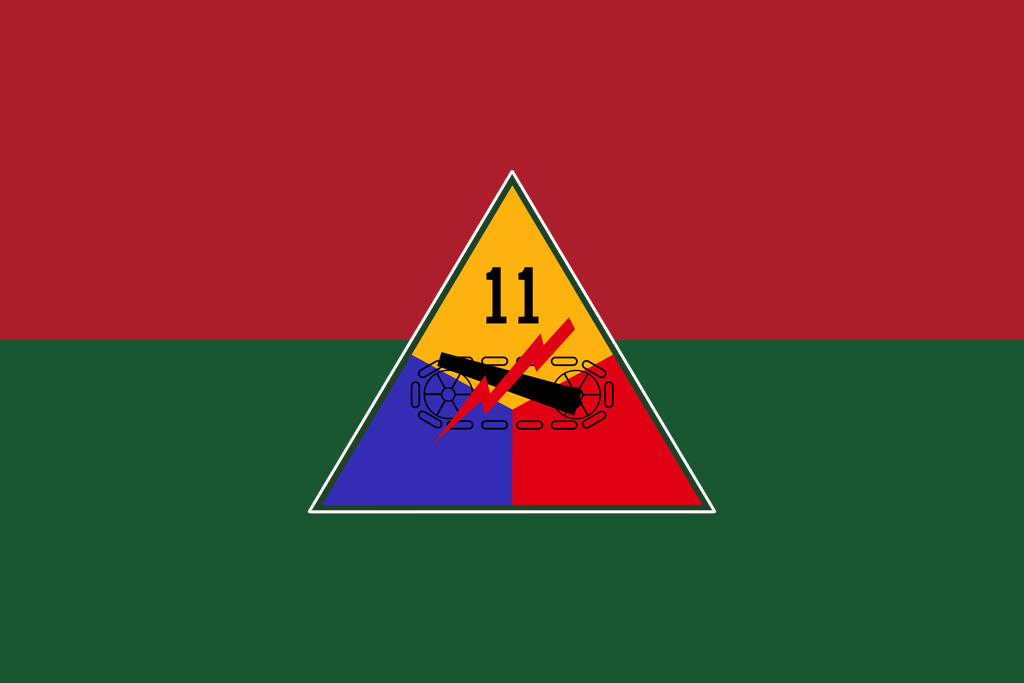
- Flag of the United States Army 11th Armored Division

The 11th Armored Division (11 AD) was a division of the United States Army in World War II. It was activated on 15 August 1942 at Camp Polk, Louisiana and moved on 24 June 1943 for the Louisiana Maneuvers under the command of Major General Edward H. Brooks. The division transferred then to Camp Barkeley, Texas on 5 September 1943, the division participated, beginning 29 October 1943, in the California Maneuvers and arrived at Camp Cooke California on 11 February 1944. The division staged at Camp Kilmer, New Jersey from 16 to 29 September 1944 until departing New York Port of Embarkation on 29 September 1944, arriving in England on 11 October 1944.

The 11 AD landed in France on 16 December 1944, crossed into Belgium on 29 December, and entered Germany on 5 March 1945. The 11th Armored Division was disbanded in August 1945.

== Commanders ==
Commanders of the 11th Armored Division were:

- Major General Edward H. Brooks, August 1942 – March 1944
- Brigadier General Charles S. Kilburn, March 1944 – March 1945
- Brigadier General (later Major General) Holmes E. Dager, March 1945 – May 1945

== Combat chronicle ==
It arrived in England 11 October 1944 with its new commander Brigadier General Charles S. Kilburn as Gen. Brooks had been reassigned to the command of 2nd Armored Division, and prepared for combat with two months' training in the Salisbury Plain Training Area. The division landed in Normandy on 16 December 1944, assigned to contain the enemy in the Lorient Pocket, but the onset of the Battle of the Bulge resulted in a forced march to the Meuse and the defense of a 30-mile sector from Givet to Sedan, 23 December. Launching an attack from Neufchâteau, Belgium, 30 December, the 11th defended the highway to Bastogne against fierce assault.

An eyewitness account by John Fague of B Company, 21st Armored Infantry Battalion of the 11th Armored Division, describes the killing of 80 German prisoners by American soldiers at the Chenogne massacre "Machine guns were being set up. These boys were to be machine gunned and murdered. We were committing the same crimes we were now accusing the Japanese and Germans of doing".

The division took heavy losses in the first five days of the Battle of the Bulge, nearly 1000 soldiers killed, wounded or missing and nearly 60 tanks and other vehicles destroyed.

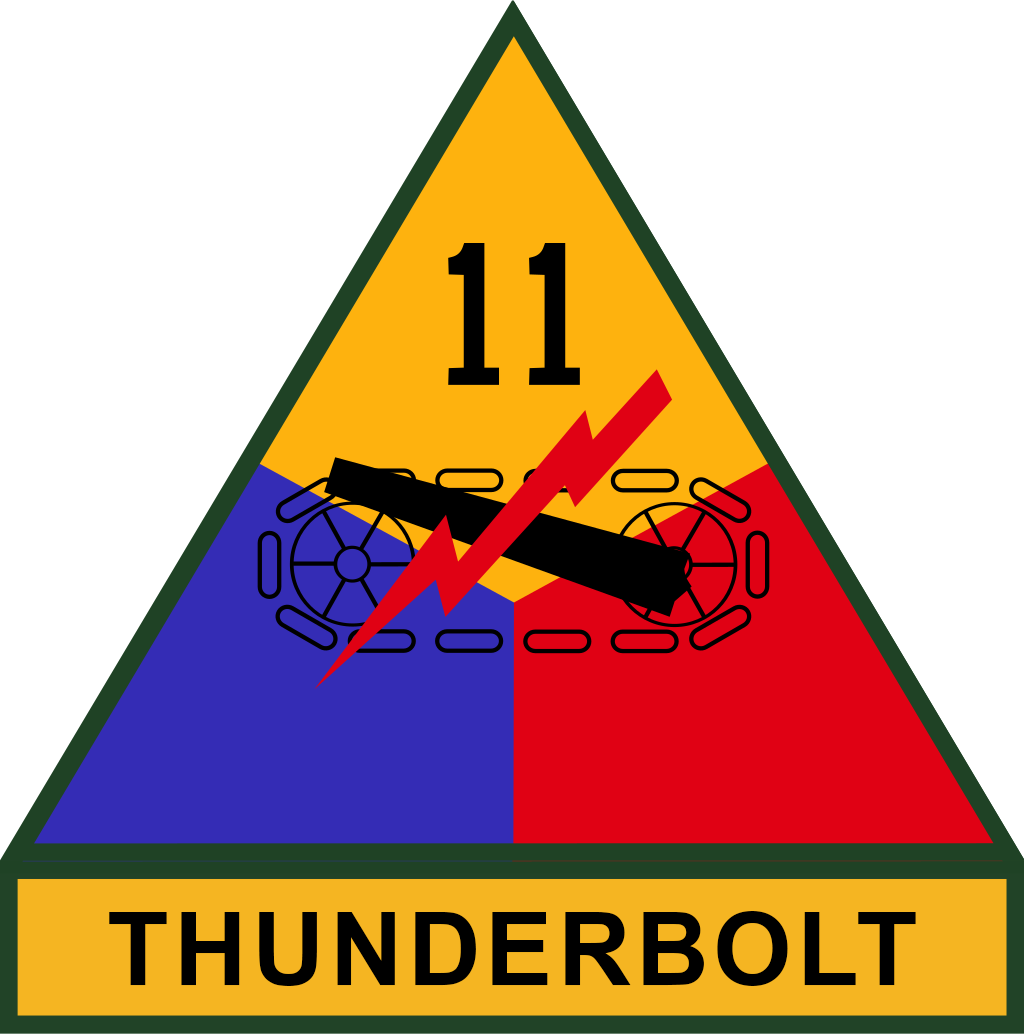
11th Armored Division "Thunderbolt" Insignia

The division acted as spearhead of a wedge into the enemy line, and its junction with the First Army at Houffalize, Belgium, 16 January 1945, created a huge trap. This action gave the division its nickname "Thunderbolt" for its rapid advance into the battle. After the liquidation of the Bulge, the Siegfried Line was pierced, Lützkampen falling 7 February, Grosskampenberg on the 17th, and the key point, Roscheid, 20 February.

After a brief rest, the division crossed the Prum and Kyll Rivers, taking Gerolstein and Nieder Bettingen against violent opposition. Andernach and Brohl fell 9 March, in the sweep to the Rhine. In the swing southward to clear the Saar-Moselle-Rhine pocket, the Moselle River was crossed at Bullay and the Worms Airport captured, 21 March.

After rest and maintenance, the division drove across the Rhine at Oppenheim, took Hanau and Fulda, and headed for the Thuringian Forest, reaching Oberhof, 3 April. The offensive raced through Bavaria, Coburg falling on the 10th, Bayreuth on the 14th.

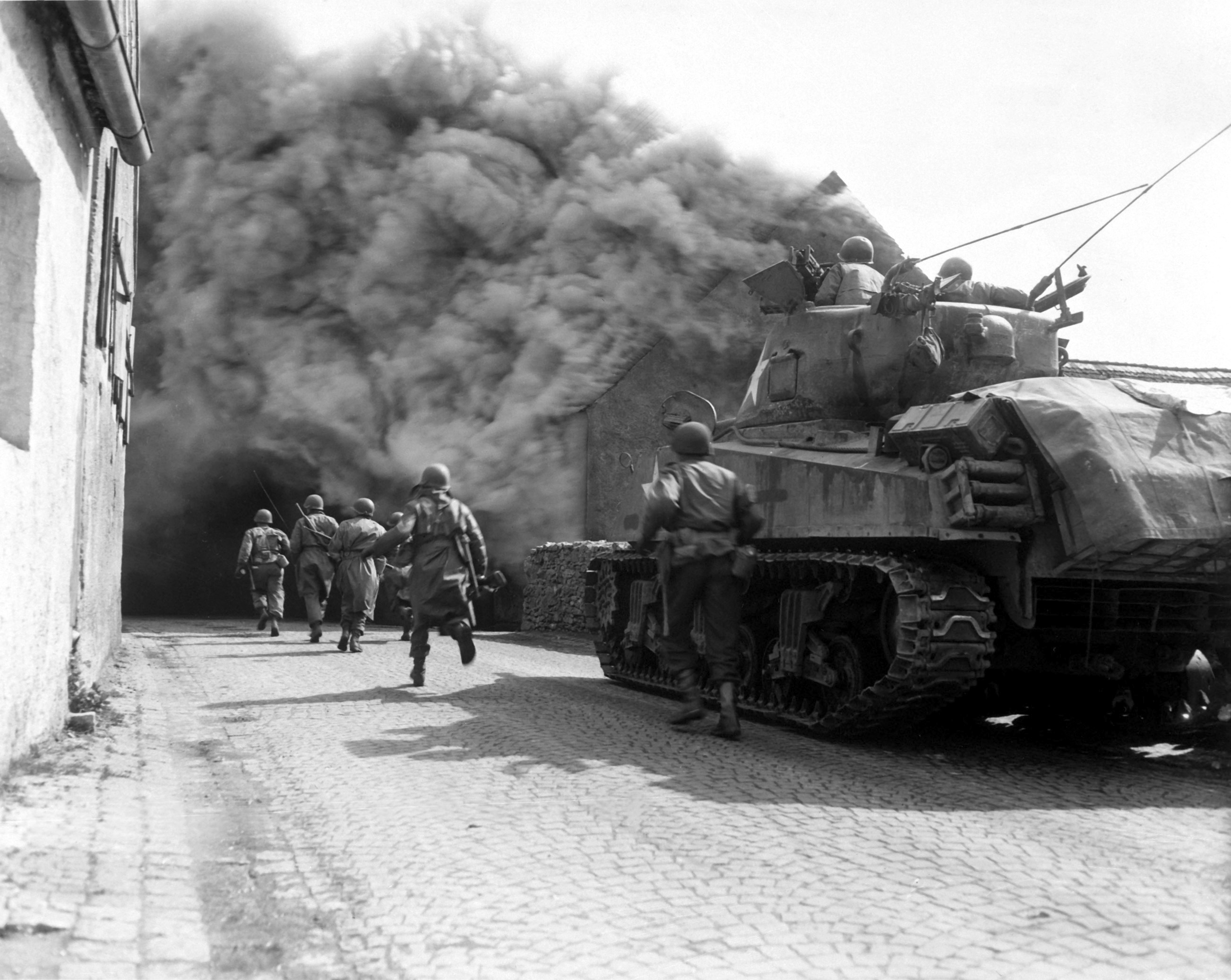
Forward elements of the 11th Armored Division advance into Wernberg in Germany on 22 April 1945 (U.S. Army photo).

In the final drive, the division crossed the Regen river, 24 April, overran Grafenau and Freyung, and plunged toward the Danube, seizing Rohrbach, Neufelden, and Zwettl. The enemy put up its last significant resistance along the approaches to Linz, Austria, but the 11th entered that city, 5 May. Pushing onward, elements contacted Soviet forces, 8 May, the first unit of the Third Army, to meet the Soviet Red Army.

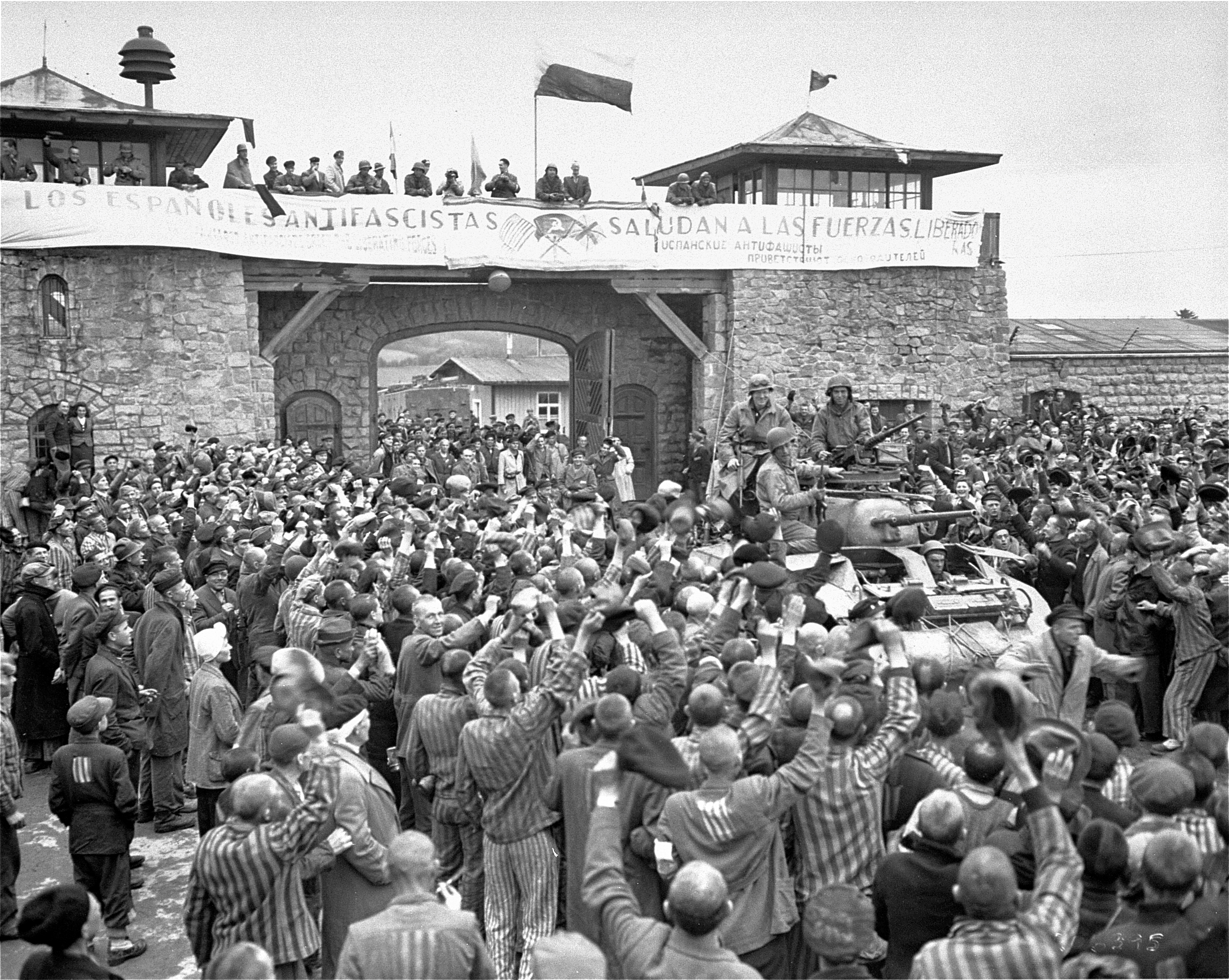
An M8 Greyhound armored car of the 11th Division entering the Mauthausen concentration camp in Austria on 6 May 1945.

On 5 May 1945, elements of the division liberated the Mauthausen concentration camp.

The war in Europe officially ended on V-E Day, 8 May, with a separate surrender to the Soviet forces the next day. The division was placed on occupational duty until it was disbanded on 31 August 1945.

== Division organization ==
=== Heavy armored division ===
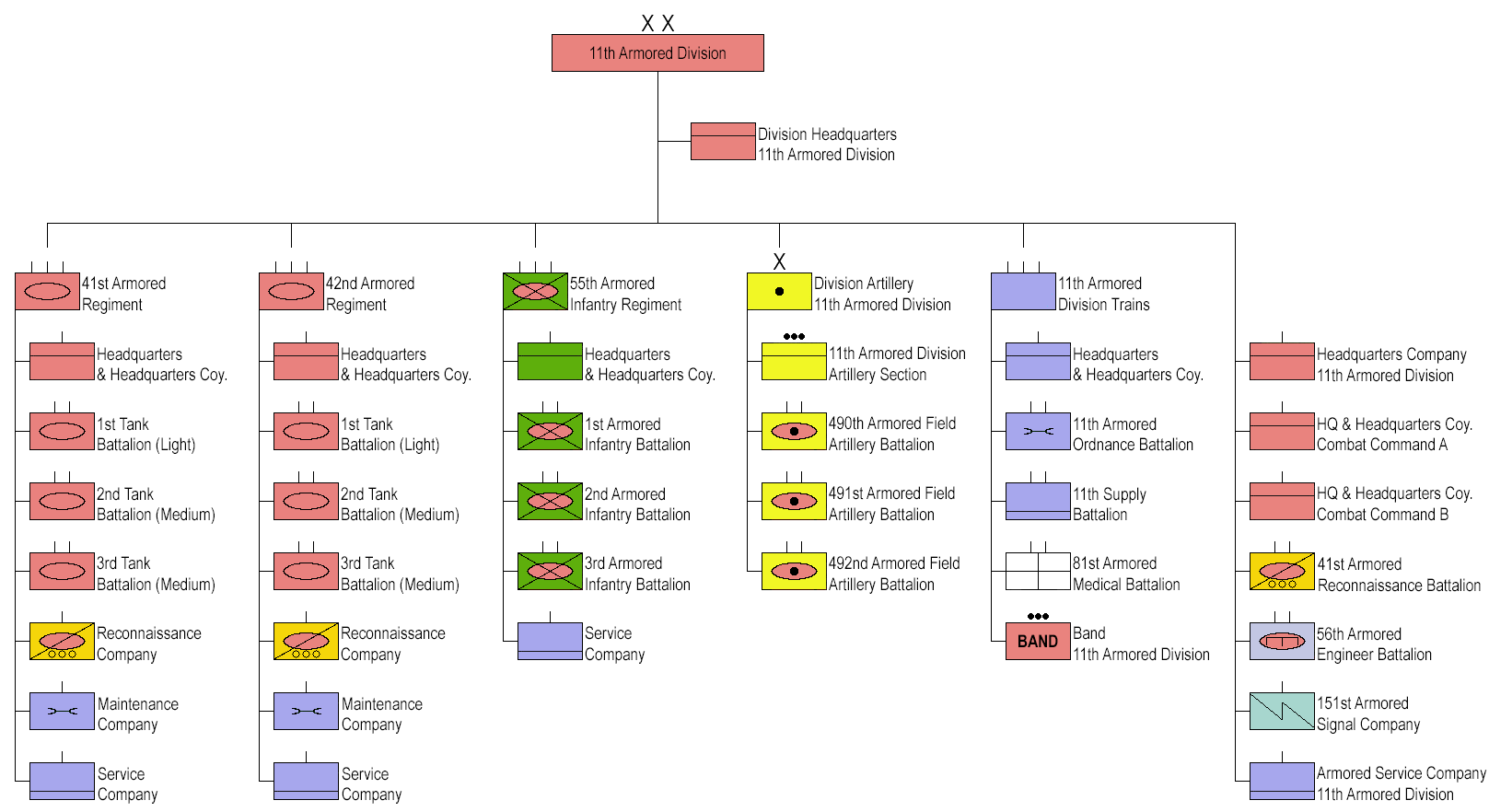
11th Armored Division organization after the division's activation (click to enlarge)

The division was activated in the Army of the United States as a heavy armored division in 1942. At the time the 11th Armored Division was composed of the following units:

- 11th Armored Division
  - Division Headquarters
  - Headquarters Company, 11th Armored Division
  - Headquarters and Headquarters Company, Combat Command A
  - Headquarters and Headquarters Company, Combat Command B
  - 151st Armored Signal Company
  - Armored Service Company (includes the division's Military Police Platoon)
  - 41st Armored Regiment
    - Headquarters and Headquarters Company
    - Reconnaissance Company (M3 scout cars and T30 HMC self propelled guns)
    - Maintenance Company
    - Service Company
    - 1st Tank Battalion (Light)
      - Headquarters and Headquarters Company
      - 3× Light Tank companies (A, B, C) (M3/M5 Stuart light tanks)
    - 2nd Tank Battalion (Medium)
      - Headquarters and Headquarters Company
      - 3× Medium Tank companies (D, E, F) (M4 Sherman tanks)
    - 3rd Tank Battalion (Medium)
      - Headquarters and Headquarters Company
      - 3× Medium Tank companies (G, H, I) (M4 Sherman tanks)
  - 42nd Armored Regiment
    - same organization as 41st Armored Regiment
  - 55th Armored Infantry Regiment
    - Headquarters and Headquarters Company
    - 3× Armored infantry battalions
      - each battalion consists of: 1× Headquarters and Headquarters Company, 3× Rifle companies on M3 half-tracks
    - Service Company
  - 41st Armored Reconnaissance Battalion
    - Headquarters and Headquarters Company
    - 3× Reconnaissance companies (M3 scout cars)
    - Light Tank Company (M3/M5 Stuart light tanks)
  - 56th Armored Engineer Battalion
    - Headquarters and Headquarters Company
    - 4× Armored engineer companies
    - Bridge Company
  - 11th Armored Division Artillery
    - 11th Armored Division Artillery Section
    - 490th Armored Field Artillery Battalion
      - Headquarters and Headquarters Battery
      - 3× Field artillery batteries (M7 Priest self propelled howitzers)
      - Service Battery
    - 491st Armored Field Artillery Battalion
      - same organization as 490th Armored Field Artillery Battalion
    - 492nd Armored Field Artillery Battalion
      - same organization as 490th Armored Field Artillery Battalion
  - 11th Armored Division Trains
    - Headquarters and Headquarters Company
    - 14th Armored Ordnance Battalion
      - Headquarters and Headquarters Company
      - 3× Maintenance companies
    - 14th Supply Battalion
      - Headquarters and Headquarters Company
      - 2× Truck companies
    - 81st Armored Medical Battalion
      - Headquarters and Headquarters Company
      - 3× Medical companies
    - 11th Armored Division Band

=== Light armored division ===
Early in 1943, the Army Ground Force began a series of studies to reorganize the various divisions within the Army. After reviewing the tables of organization and after allowing the various commands to review and comment on the proposed restructure, the War Department published on 15 September 1943 a new armored division tables of organization. The restructuring removed the two armored regiments and armored infantry regiment from the table of organization and replaced them with three tank battalions and three armored infantry battalions. Each tank battalion included one light and three medium tank companies. Both Combat Commands, A and B, remained, but an additional Reserve Command was added to the organization. This was a small headquarters element of 10 personnel tasked to clarify command and control in the division's rear area. Armored engineer battalions lost their bridge companies, while their engineer companies were reduced from four to three. The division's cavalry reconnaissance squadron was increased in size to include an HQ Troop, four reconnaissance troops, a light tank company, and an assault gun troop of four platoons (one for each reconnaissance troop). Within the division trains, the division lost its supply battalion and the division's armored service company. These changes pared the division's strength from 14,630 men to 10,937, slashed the number of tanks from 360 to 263, reduced the variety of vehicles to ease repair problems, and eliminated the maintenance-prone motorcycles.

After its reorganization as a light armored division the 11th Armored Division was composed of the following units:

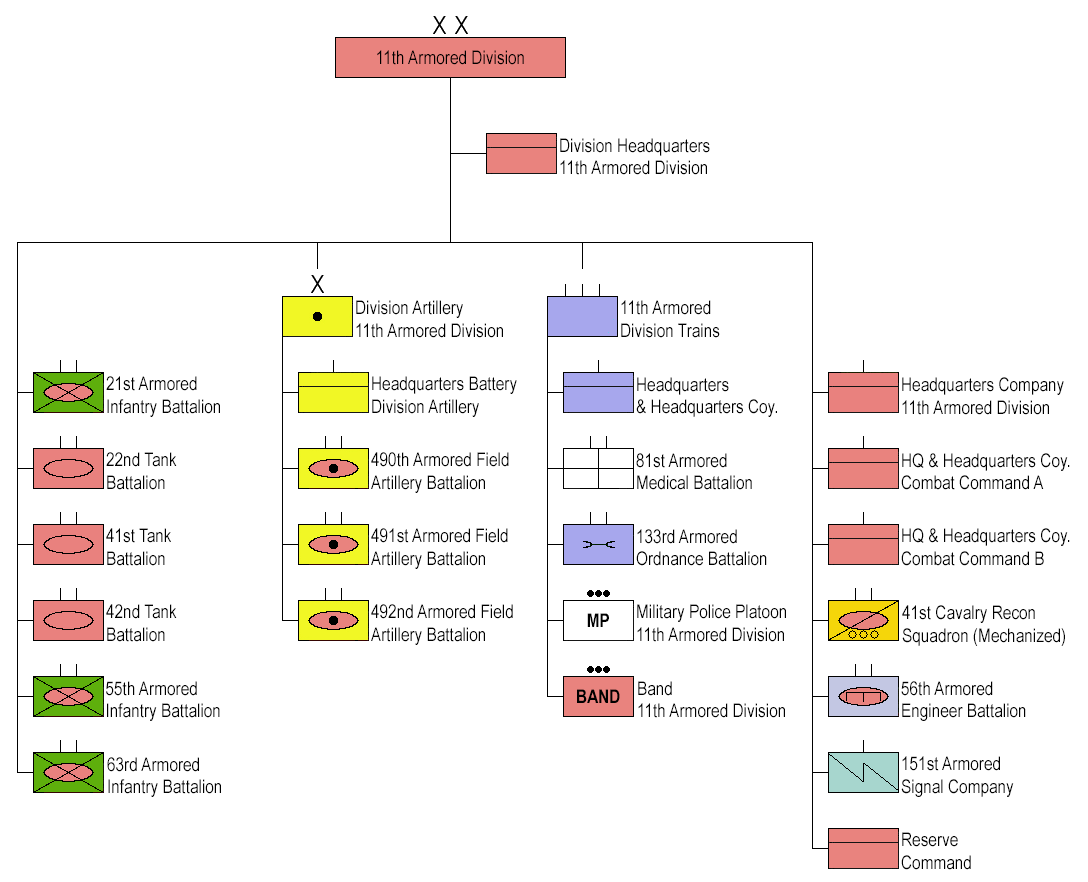
11th Armored Division organization after the division's reorganization (click to enlarge)

- 11th Armored Division
  - Division Headquarters
  - Headquarters Company, 11th Armored Division
  - Headquarters and Headquarters Company, Combat Command A
  - Headquarters and Headquarters Company, Combat Command B
  - 151st Armored Signal Company
  - Reserve Command
  - 22nd Tank Battalion
    - Headquarters and Headquarters Company
    - 3× Medium Tank companies (M4 Sherman tanks)
    - Light Tank Company (M3/M5 Stuart or M24 Chaffee light tanks)
    - Service Company
  - 41st Tank Battalion
    - same organization as 22nd Tank Battalion
  - 42nd Tank Battalion
    - same organization as 22nd Tank Battalion
  - 21st Armored Infantry Battalion
    - Headquarters and Headquarters Company
    - 3× Rifle companies (M3 half-tracks)
    - Service Company
  - 55th Armored Infantry Battalion
    - same organization as 21st Armored Infantry Battalion
  - 63rd Armored Infantry Battalion
    - same organization as 21st Armored Infantry Battalion
  - 41st Cavalry Reconnaissance Squadron (Mechanized)
    - Headquarters and Headquarters and Service Troop
    - 4× Cavalry reconnaissance troops (M8 Greyhound armored cars)
    - Cavalry Assault Gun Troop (M8 Scott self propelled guns)
    - Light Tank Company (M3/M5 Stuart or M24 Chaffee light tanks)
  - 56th Armored Engineer Battalion
    - Headquarters and Headquarters Company
    - 3× Armored engineer companies
  - 11th Armored Division Artillery
    - Headquarters and Headquarters Battery
    - 490th Armored Field Artillery Battalion
      - Headquarters and Headquarters Battery
      - 3× Field artillery batteries (M7 Priest self propelled howitzers)
      - Service Battery
    - 491st Armored Field Artillery Battalion
      - same organization as 490th Armored Field Artillery Battalion
    - 492nd Armored Field Artillery Battalion
      - same organization as 490th Armored Field Artillery Battalion
  - 11th Armored Division Trains
    - Headquarters and Headquarters Company
    - 81st Armored Medical Battalion
      - Headquarters and Headquarters Company
      - 3× Medical companies
    - 133rd Armored Ordnance Battalion
      - Headquarters and Headquarters Company
      - 3× Maintenance companies
    - Military Police Platoon
    - 11th Armored Division Band

== Casualties ==
- Total battle casualties: 2,877
- Killed in action: 432
- Wounded in action: 2,394
- Missing in action: 11
- Prisoner of war: 40
