= Hertzfeld =

Hertzfeld, Hertzfeldt are surnames of:

- Andy Hertzfeld (born 1953), a key member of the original Apple Macintosh development team
- Don Hertzfeldt
- Estella Hertzfeld (1837–1881), Dutch poet

== See also ==
- Herzfeld
