= Reipeldingen =

- Municipality
- Location of Reipeldingen within Eifelkreis Bitburg-Prüm district
- Interactive map of Reipeldingen
- Location within Germany Location within Rhineland-Palatinate
- Coordinates: 50°04′58″N 06°10′54″E
- Country: Germany
- State: Rhineland-Palatinate
- District: Eifelkreis Bitburg-Prüm
- Municipal assoc.: Arzfeld

Government
  - Mayor (2019–24): Gommarus Oest

Area
  - Total: 4.76 km^{2} (1.84 sq mi)
- Elevation: 490 m (1,610 ft)

Population (2025-12-31)
  - Total: 89
  - Density: 19/km^{2} (48/sq mi)
- Time zone: UTC+01:00 (CET)
  - Summer (DST): UTC+02:00 (CEST)
- Postal codes: 54689
- Dialling codes: 06550
- Vehicle registration: BIT
- Website: www.reipeldingen.de

Reipeldingen is a municipality in the district of Bitburg-Prüm, in Rhineland-Palatinate, western Germany.
