= Olmscheid =

- Municipality
- Coat of arms

- Location of Olmscheid within Eifelkreis Bitburg-Prüm district
- Interactive map of Olmscheid
- Location within Germany Location within Rhineland-Palatinate
- Coordinates: 50°03′59″N 6°13′25″E
- Country: Germany
- State: Rhineland-Palatinate
- District: Eifelkreis Bitburg-Prüm
- Municipal assoc.: Arzfeld

Government
  - Mayor (2019–24): Ingo Kleis

Area
  - Total: 4.87 km^{2} (1.88 sq mi)
- Elevation: 510 m (1,670 ft)

Population (2025-12-31)
  - Total: 198
  - Density: 40.7/km^{2} (105/sq mi)
- Time zone: UTC+01:00 (CET)
  - Summer (DST): UTC+02:00 (CEST)
- Postal codes: 54689
- Dialling codes: 06550
- Vehicle registration: BIT
- Website: www.olmscheid.net

Olmscheid is a municipality in the district of Bitburg-Prüm, in Rhineland-Palatinate, western Germany.
