= Preischeid =

- Municipality
- Coat of arms

- Location of Preischeid within Eifelkreis Bitburg-Prüm district
- Interactive map of Preischeid
- Location within Germany Location within Rhineland-Palatinate
- Coordinates: 50°02′13″N 6°09′13″E
- Country: Germany
- State: Rhineland-Palatinate
- District: Eifelkreis Bitburg-Prüm
- Municipal assoc.: Arzfeld

Government
  - Mayor (2019–24): Martin Klaesges

Area
  - Total: 6.20 km^{2} (2.39 sq mi)
- Elevation: 460 m (1,510 ft)

Population (2025-12-31)
  - Total: 148
  - Density: 23.9/km^{2} (61.8/sq mi)
- Time zone: UTC+01:00 (CET)
  - Summer (DST): UTC+02:00 (CEST)
- Postal codes: 54689
- Dialling codes: 06550
- Vehicle registration: BIT
- Website: www.preischeid.de

Preischeid is a municipality in the district of Bitburg-Prüm, in Rhineland-Palatinate, western Germany.
