= Strickscheid =

- Municipality
- Location of Strickscheid within Eifelkreis Bitburg-Prüm district
- Interactive map of Strickscheid
- Location within Germany Location within Rhineland-Palatinate
- Coordinates: 50°08′52″N 06°17′52″E
- Country: Germany
- State: Rhineland-Palatinate
- District: Eifelkreis Bitburg-Prüm
- Municipal assoc.: Arzfeld

Government
  - Mayor (2019–24): Albert Thiex

Area
  - Total: 1.41 km^{2} (0.54 sq mi)
- Elevation: 310 m (1,020 ft)

Population (2025-12-31)
  - Total: 28
  - Density: 20/km^{2} (51/sq mi)
- Time zone: UTC+01:00 (CET)
  - Summer (DST): UTC+02:00 (CEST)
- Postal codes: 54597
- Dialling codes: 06556
- Vehicle registration: BIT
- Website: www.strickscheid.de

Strickscheid is a municipality in the district of Bitburg-Prüm, in Rhineland-Palatinate, western Germany.
