= Niederpierscheid =

- Municipality
- Location of Niederpierscheid within Eifelkreis Bitburg-Prüm district
- Interactive map of Niederpierscheid
- Location within Germany Location within Rhineland-Palatinate
- Coordinates: 50°04′44″N 06°22′23″E
- Country: Germany
- State: Rhineland-Palatinate
- District: Eifelkreis Bitburg-Prüm
- Municipal assoc.: Arzfeld

Government
  - Mayor (2019–24): Marco Steins

Area
  - Total: 1.64 km^{2} (0.63 sq mi)
- Elevation: 369 m (1,211 ft)

Population (2025-12-31)
  - Total: 33
  - Density: 20/km^{2} (52/sq mi)
- Time zone: UTC+01:00 (CET)
  - Summer (DST): UTC+02:00 (CEST)
- Postal codes: 54649
- Dialling codes: 06554
- Vehicle registration: BIT
- Website: www.niederpierscheid.de

Niederpierscheid is a municipality in the district of Bitburg-Prüm, in Rhineland-Palatinate, western Germany.
