= Oberpierscheid =

- Municipality
- Coat of arms

- Location of Oberpierscheid within Eifelkreis Bitburg-Prüm district
- Interactive map of Oberpierscheid
- Location within Germany Location within Rhineland-Palatinate
- Coordinates: 50°03′58″N 6°22′28″E
- Country: Germany
- State: Rhineland-Palatinate
- District: Eifelkreis Bitburg-Prüm
- Municipal assoc.: Arzfeld

Government
  - Mayor (2019–24): Arno Steins

Area
  - Total: 10.53 km^{2} (4.07 sq mi)
- Elevation: 530 m (1,740 ft)

Population (2025-12-31)
  - Total: 338
  - Density: 32.1/km^{2} (83.1/sq mi)
- Time zone: UTC+01:00 (CET)
  - Summer (DST): UTC+02:00 (CEST)
- Postal codes: 54649
- Dialling codes: 06554
- Vehicle registration: BIT
- Website: www.oberpierscheid.de

Oberpierscheid is a municipality in the district of Bitburg-Prüm, in Rhineland-Palatinate, western Germany.
