= Pintesfeld =

- Municipality
- Location of Pintesfeld within Eifelkreis Bitburg-Prüm district
- Interactive map of Pintesfeld
- Location within Germany Location within Rhineland-Palatinate
- Coordinates: 50°06′30″N 06°21′56″E
- Country: Germany
- State: Rhineland-Palatinate
- District: Eifelkreis Bitburg-Prüm
- Municipal assoc.: Arzfeld

Government
  - Mayor (2019–24): Thomas Wirtz

Area
  - Total: 1.90 km^{2} (0.73 sq mi)
- Elevation: 450 m (1,480 ft)

Population (2025-12-31)
  - Total: 36
  - Density: 19/km^{2} (49/sq mi)
- Time zone: UTC+01:00 (CET)
  - Summer (DST): UTC+02:00 (CEST)
- Postal codes: 54649
- Dialling codes: 06554
- Vehicle registration: BIT
- Website: www.pintesfeld.de

Pintesfeld is a municipality in the district of Bitburg-Prüm, in Rhineland-Palatinate, western Germany.
