= Eschfeld =

- Municipality
- Coat of arms

- Location of Eschfeld within Eifelkreis Bitburg-Prüm district
- Interactive map of Eschfeld
- Location within Germany Location within Rhineland-Palatinate
- Coordinates: 50°06′45″N 6°12′01″E
- Country: Germany
- State: Rhineland-Palatinate
- District: Eifelkreis Bitburg-Prüm
- Municipal assoc.: Arzfeld
- First mentioned: 1330

Government
  - Mayor (2022–24): Stephan Heck

Area
  - Total: 4.78 km^{2} (1.85 sq mi)
- Elevation: 500 m (1,600 ft)

Population (2025-12-31)
  - Total: 191
  - Density: 40.0/km^{2} (103/sq mi)
- Time zone: UTC+01:00 (CET)
  - Summer (DST): UTC+02:00 (CEST)
- Postal codes: 54619
- Dialling codes: 06559
- Vehicle registration: BIT
- Website: www.eschfeld.de

Eschfeld is a municipality in the district of Bitburg-Prüm, in Rhineland-Palatinate, western Germany.

== Geography ==
Eschfeld is located in the South Eifel Nature Park. The community includes parts of the Banzenhof residential area and the hamlet of Wässerchen. Both towns also belong to the neighboring municipality of Reiff.

== History ==
Eschfeld's beginnings as a Celtic settlement date back to around 400 BC. BC, which is concluded by finds of bone remains and vessel shards from 1948. There is also a group of tumulus and a cremation burial ground in the Eschfeld area from the Hunsrück-Eifel culture period and the Roman period. Both are now viewed as a connected necropolis.

The first documented mention dates back to 1330, when Eschfeld belonged to the Archdiocese of Trier. Until the end of the 18th century, Eschfeld was the capital of one of the three dairy farms (administrative and judicial districts) that belonged to the Dasburg rule in the Luxembourg county of Vianden. 13 towns belonged to the Eschfeld dairy.

Information on the size of Eschfeld's population was given in 1611, when ten "Feuerstätten" (dwellings) were recorded in the village. The decline in population caused by the plague that broke out in Eschfeld in 1656 was not recovered until around 100 years later. Like large parts of the Rhineland, Eschfeld was occupied by the French in 1794 and was given its own mayor's office (Mairie). During the bobbin war against the occupying forces, four Eschfeld citizens were executed in Luxembourg. During the French administration, Eschfeld belonged to the French diocese of Metz from 1802. As a result of the Congress of Vienna in 1815, Eschfeld also became part of Prussia and belonged to the diocese of Trier again from 1818.

From 1904 Eschfeld was part of the Leidenborn mayor's office, from 1936 it belonged to the Daleiden-Leidenborn office and since 1970 to the Arzfeld municipality.

A loan association was founded in 1884, a rural training school was established in 1887 and a fruit-growing association was founded in 1889. Eschfeld has been connected to the electricity grid since 1928. The Second World War left a great deal of damage in Eschfeld, around 60% of the village was destroyed. On 22 February 1945, the town was occupied by American troops.

In 1969, a school was built in Eschfeld, which existed until the 1980s. The building was converted into a village community centre in 1993.

=== Population development ===
The development of the population of Eschfeld, the values from 1871 to 1987, are based on censuses:

Year	population
1815	121
1835	222
1871	233
1905	220
1939	480

Year	population
1950	243
1961	218
1970	241
1987	182
1997	191

Year	population
2005	182
2011	182
2017	198
2022	201

== Politics ==
=== Municipal council ===
The municipal council in Eschfeld consists of six councillors, who were elected in a majority vote in the local elections on 26 May 2019, and the honorary local mayor as chairman.

=== Mayor ===
Peter Marx had been in office since 2014, but died unexpectedly in October 2021. As no valid nominations were submitted for a direct election scheduled for 20 February 2022, the new election was now the responsibility of the council in accordance with the municipal code. In the election on 10 March 2022, the previous 1st alderman, Stephan Heck, was elected as the new mayor of Eschfeld.

=== Coat of arms ===
The German blazon reads: Geteilt und oben gespalten, vorn in silber blaues bauchiges Tongefäß, hinten in grün goldene Ähre, unten in rot silberne Leiste, belegt mit silberner Scheibe, diese belegt mit blauem Balken und rotem Pfahl mit trapezförmigen Enden.

The municipality's arms might in English heraldic language be described thus: Divided and split at the top, in front in silver blue bulbous clay vessel, behind in green golden ear of corn, below in red silver bar, covered with silver disc, this covered with blue bar and red pole with trapezoidal ends.

The 2400-year-old clay pot comes from a Celtic burial mound and is the oldest evidence of the settlement of the Eschfeld area. The former place name Eszfeld stands for a cleared seed field, hence the green pasture and the ear of corn. For over half a century, Eschfeld belonged to the Luxembourg county of Vianden, whose coat of arms features a silver bar on a red background. The parish of Eschfeld was looked after by priests from the Vianden Trinitarian convent. Their religious symbol, the Trinitarian cross, symbolises the Trinity.

== Sightseeing ==
Eschfeld's church and cemetery were located in what is now the lower village until 1867. The current parish church of St. Luzia was built in 1869 and decorated with ceiling and wall paintings by priest Christoph März between 1906 and 1921. The Romanesque baptismal font stands at the side of the church. Eschfeld's cemetery of honour is also located next to the parish church. The former Volksschule was built next to the parish church in 1912.
