= Arzfeld (Verbandsgemeinde) =

- Verbandsgemeinde
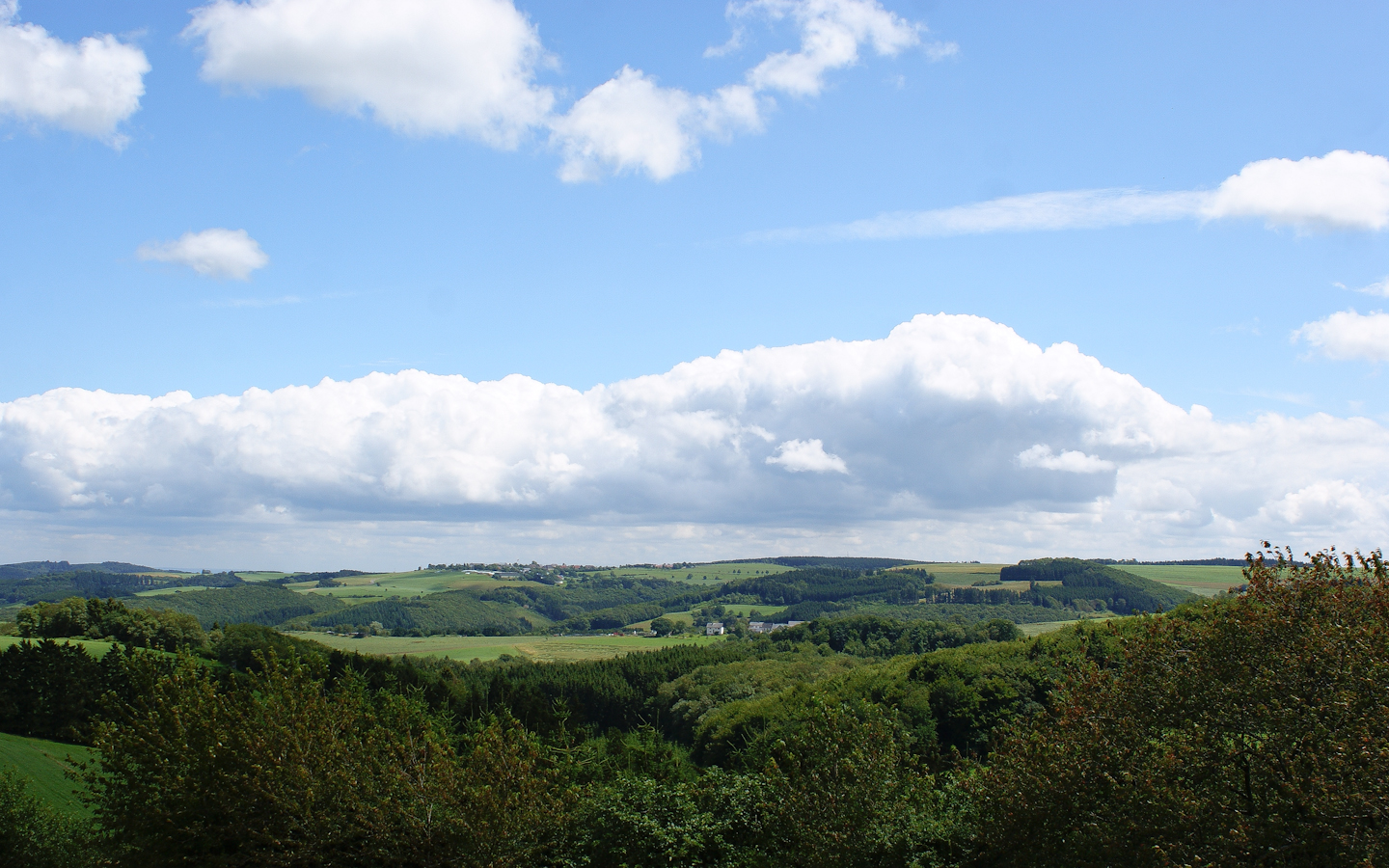
- Lauperath

- Location of Arzfeld within Bitburg-Prüm district
- Interactive map of Arzfeld
- Location within Germany Location within Rhineland-Palatinate
- Coordinates: 50°05′N 6°17′E
- Country: Germany
- State: Rhineland-Palatinate
- District: Bitburg-Prüm
- Seat: Arzfeld
- Subdivisions: 43 municipalities

Area
  - Total: 265.89 km^{2} (102.66 sq mi)

Population (2025-12-31)
  - Total: 9,544
  - Density: 35.89/km^{2} (92.97/sq mi)
- Time zone: UTC+01:00 (CET)
  - Summer (DST): UTC+02:00 (CEST)
- Website: www.vg-arzfeld.de

Arzfeld is a Verbandsgemeinde ("collective municipality") in the district Bitburg-Prüm, in Rhineland-Palatinate, Germany. The seat of the Verbandsgemeinde is in Arzfeld. It was established in 1970 by the merger of the former Ämter Daleiden-Leidenborn and Waxweiler, and covers the western part of the district. Its area is 265.9 km^{2} (102.7 sq mi) and its population is 9,664 (December 2021).

The Verbandsgemeinde Arzfeld consists of the following Ortsgemeinden ("local municipalities"):

1. Arzfeld
2. Dackscheid
3. Dahnen
4. Daleiden
5. Dasburg
6. Eilscheid
7. Eschfeld
8. Euscheid
9. Großkampenberg
10. Hargarten
11. Harspelt
12. Herzfeld
13. Irrhausen
14. Jucken
15. Kesfeld
16. Kickeshausen
17. Kinzenburg
18. Krautscheid
19. Lambertsberg
20. Lascheid
21. Lauperath
22. Leidenborn
23. Lichtenborn
24. Lierfeld
25. Lünebach
26. Lützkampen
27. Manderscheid
28. Mauel
29. Merlscheid
30. Niederpierscheid
31. Oberpierscheid
32. Olmscheid
33. Pintesfeld
34. Plütscheid
35. Preischeid
36. Reiff
37. Reipeldingen
38. Roscheid
39. Sengerich
40. Sevenig (Our)
41. Strickscheid
42. Üttfeld
43. Waxweiler
