= Üttfeld =

- Municipality
- Location of Üttfeld within Eifelkreis Bitburg-Prüm district
- Interactive map of Üttfeld
- Location within Germany Location within Rhineland-Palatinate
- Coordinates: 50°8′10″N 6°15′11″E
- Country: Germany
- State: Rhineland-Palatinate
- District: Eifelkreis Bitburg-Prüm
- Municipal assoc.: Arzfeld

Government
  - Mayor (2019–24): Jutta Zils

Area
  - Total: 14.93 km^{2} (5.76 sq mi)
- Elevation: 518 m (1,699 ft)

Population (2025-12-31)
  - Total: 384
  - Density: 25.7/km^{2} (66.6/sq mi)
- Time zone: UTC+01:00 (CET)
  - Summer (DST): UTC+02:00 (CEST)
- Postal codes: 54619
- Dialling codes: 06559
- Vehicle registration: BIT
- Website: uettfeld.de

Üttfeld is a municipality in the district of Bitburg-Prüm, in Rhineland-Palatinate, western Germany.
