= Sengerich =

- Municipality
- Location of Sengerich within Eifelkreis Bitburg-Prüm district
- Interactive map of Sengerich
- Location within Germany Location within Rhineland-Palatinate
- Coordinates: 50°07′21″N 06°13′18″E
- Country: Germany
- State: Rhineland-Palatinate
- District: Eifelkreis Bitburg-Prüm
- Municipal assoc.: Arzfeld

Government
  - Mayor (2019–24): Rudolf Heck

Area
  - Total: 1.10 km^{2} (0.42 sq mi)
- Elevation: 530 m (1,740 ft)

Population (2025-12-31)
  - Total: 20
  - Density: 18/km^{2} (47/sq mi)
- Time zone: UTC+01:00 (CET)
  - Summer (DST): UTC+02:00 (CEST)
- Postal codes: 54619
- Dialling codes: 06559
- Vehicle registration: BIT
- Website: www.sengerich.de

Sengerich is a municipality in the district of Bitburg-Prüm, in Rhineland-Palatinate, western Germany.
