= Plütscheid =

- Municipality
- Coat of arms

- Location of Plütscheid within Eifelkreis Bitburg-Prüm district
- Interactive map of Plütscheid
- Location within Germany Location within Rhineland-Palatinate
- Coordinates: 50°05′22″N 6°25′40″E
- Country: Germany
- State: Rhineland-Palatinate
- District: Eifelkreis Bitburg-Prüm
- Municipal assoc.: Arzfeld

Government
  - Mayor (2019–24): Johann Heltemes

Area
  - Total: 12.68 km^{2} (4.90 sq mi)
- Elevation: 456 m (1,496 ft)

Population (2025-12-31)
  - Total: 316
  - Density: 24.9/km^{2} (64.5/sq mi)
- Time zone: UTC+01:00 (CET)
  - Summer (DST): UTC+02:00 (CEST)
- Postal codes: 54597
- Dialling codes: 06554
- Vehicle registration: BIT
- Website: www.pluetscheid.de

Plütscheid is a municipality in the district of Bitburg-Prüm, in Rhineland-Palatinate, western Germany.
