= Leidenborn =

- Municipality
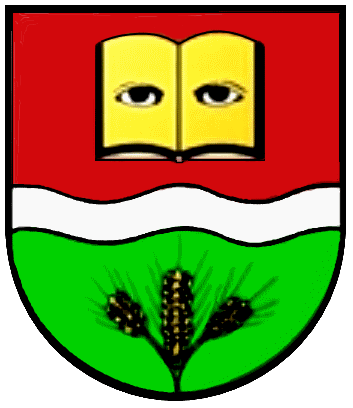
- Coat of arms

- Location of Leidenborn within Eifelkreis Bitburg-Prüm district
- Interactive map of Leidenborn
- Location within Germany Location within Rhineland-Palatinate
- Coordinates: 50°08′13″N 6°13′06″E
- Country: Germany
- State: Rhineland-Palatinate
- District: Eifelkreis Bitburg-Prüm
- Municipal assoc.: Arzfeld

Government
  - Mayor (2019–24): Hermann Schwalen

Area
  - Total: 5.57 km^{2} (2.15 sq mi)
- Elevation: 520 m (1,710 ft)

Population (2025-12-31)
  - Total: 202
  - Density: 36.3/km^{2} (93.9/sq mi)
- Time zone: UTC+01:00 (CET)
  - Summer (DST): UTC+02:00 (CEST)
- Postal codes: 54619
- Dialling codes: 06559
- Vehicle registration: BIT
- Website: www.leidenborn.de

Leidenborn is a municipality in the district of Bitburg-Prüm, in Rhineland-Palatinate, western Germany.
