= Mauel =

- Municipality
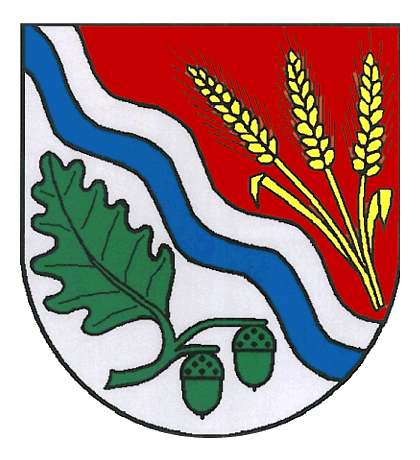
- Coat of arms

- Location of Mauel within Eifelkreis Bitburg-Prüm district
- Interactive map of Mauel
- Location within Germany Location within Rhineland-Palatinate
- Coordinates: 50°04′25″N 6°23′34″E
- Country: Germany
- State: Rhineland-Palatinate
- District: Eifelkreis Bitburg-Prüm
- Municipal assoc.: Arzfeld

Government
  - Mayor (2019–24): Walter Fuchs

Area
  - Total: 5.34 km^{2} (2.06 sq mi)
- Elevation: 396 m (1,299 ft)

Population (2025-12-31)
  - Total: 43
  - Density: 8.1/km^{2} (21/sq mi)
- Time zone: UTC+01:00 (CET)
  - Summer (DST): UTC+02:00 (CEST)
- Postal codes: 54649
- Dialling codes: 06554
- Vehicle registration: BIT
- Website: www.mauel-net.de

Mauel is a municipality in the district of Bitburg-Prüm, in Rhineland-Palatinate, western Germany.
