= Kesfeld =

- Municipality
- Coat of arms

- Location of Kesfeld within Eifelkreis Bitburg-Prüm district
- Interactive map of Kesfeld
- Location within Germany Location within Rhineland-Palatinate
- Coordinates: 50°9′11″N 6°13′59″E
- Country: Germany
- State: Rhineland-Palatinate
- District: Eifelkreis Bitburg-Prüm
- Municipal assoc.: Arzfeld

Government
  - Mayor (2019–24): Roland Kotz

Area
  - Total: 4.47 km^{2} (1.73 sq mi)
- Elevation: 496 m (1,627 ft)

Population (2025-12-31)
  - Total: 71
  - Density: 16/km^{2} (41/sq mi)
- Time zone: UTC+01:00 (CET)
  - Summer (DST): UTC+02:00 (CEST)
- Postal codes: 54619
- Dialling codes: 06559
- Vehicle registration: BIT
- Website: www.kesfeld.de

Kesfeld is a municipality in the district of Bitburg-Prüm, in Rhineland-Palatinate, western Germany.
