= Dahnen =

- Municipality
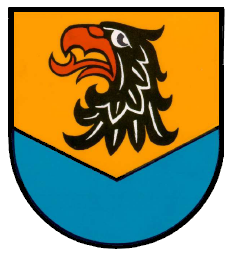
- Coat of arms

- Location of Dahnen within Eifelkreis Bitburg-Prüm district
- Interactive map of Dahnen
- Location within Germany Location within Rhineland-Palatinate
- Coordinates: 50°04′26″N 06°08′48″E
- Country: Germany
- State: Rhineland-Palatinate
- District: Eifelkreis Bitburg-Prüm
- Municipal assoc.: Arzfeld

Government
  - Mayor (2019–24): Peter Philippe

Area
  - Total: 17.21 km^{2} (6.64 sq mi)
- Elevation: 480 m (1,570 ft)

Population (2025-12-31)
  - Total: 341
  - Density: 19.8/km^{2} (51.3/sq mi)
- Time zone: UTC+01:00 (CET)
  - Summer (DST): UTC+02:00 (CEST)
- Postal codes: 54689
- Dialling codes: 06550
- Vehicle registration: BIT
- Website: www.dahnen.net

Dahnen (German pronunciation: [ˈdaːnən]) is a municipality in the district of Bitburg-Prüm, in Rhineland-Palatinate, western Germany.
