= Harspelt =

- Municipality
- Location of Harspelt within Eifelkreis Bitburg-Prüm district
- Interactive map of Harspelt
- Location within Germany Location within Rhineland-Palatinate
- Coordinates: 50°08′17″N 6°10′20″E
- Country: Germany
- State: Rhineland-Palatinate
- District: Eifelkreis Bitburg-Prüm
- Municipal assoc.: Arzfeld

Government
  - Mayor (2019–24): Dirk Wetzel

Area
  - Total: 4.82 km^{2} (1.86 sq mi)
- Elevation: 480–500 m (1,570–1,640 ft)

Population (2025-12-31)
  - Total: 66
  - Density: 14/km^{2} (35/sq mi)
- Time zone: UTC+01:00 (CET)
  - Summer (DST): UTC+02:00 (CEST)
- Postal codes: 54617
- Dialling codes: 06559
- Vehicle registration: BIT
- Website: www.harspelt.de

Harspelt is a municipality in the district of Bitburg-Prüm, in Rhineland-Palatinate, western Germany.
