= Eichelhardt =

- Municipality
- Coat of arms

- Location of Eichelhardt within Altenkirchen district
- Interactive map of Eichelhardt
- Location within Germany Location within Rhineland-Palatinate
- Coordinates: 50°43′6″N 7°42′2″E
- Country: Germany
- State: Rhineland-Palatinate
- District: Altenkirchen
- Municipal assoc.: Altenkirchen-Flammersfeld

Government
  - Mayor (2019–24): Rainer Zeuner

Area
  - Total: 2.84 km^{2} (1.10 sq mi)
- Elevation: 296 m (971 ft)

Population (2025-12-31)
  - Total: 513
  - Density: 181/km^{2} (468/sq mi)
- Time zone: UTC+01:00 (CET)
  - Summer (DST): UTC+02:00 (CEST)
- Postal codes: 57612
- Dialling codes: 02681, 02682
- Vehicle registration: AK
- Website: vg-altenkirchen-flammersfeld.de

Eichelhardt is a municipality in the district of Altenkirchen, in Rhineland-Palatinate, Germany.

== Transport links ==
Eichelhardt is located in the area of the transport association Verkehrsverbund Rhein-Mosel (VRM), in the fare zone number 912 and served by the local bus lines 280 and 289, the village also is located at the Marienwanderweg, a walking path leading from Marienstatt Abbey in Streithausen to Marienthal Abbey (Westerwald).
