= Alst =

Coordinates: 52.098°N 7.328°E

Alst is a hamlet of the City of Horstmar in the northwest of North Rhine-Westphalia, near Münster, Germany.

== Location ==
Alst is located in the district of Steinfurt, which is part of the region of Münster, near Horstmar. The distance to the northern district town Steinfurt is about eight kilometers, Münster in the south-east direction is about 30 kilometers away. The Dutch border with Gronau in northwest is also about 30 km away.

== History ==
Already in 1155 AD the hamlet Alst is mentioned. Its name might be based on alahstedi (Old German for sanctuary site) and Alstet (about 1319). The name 'Alst (Alahstedi)' indicates an early Germanic place of sacrifice. This was probably at the site of the present 'Alster Kreuz' (Alst Cross), where a few years ago the remains of a Christ Corpus of early Christian times were found between ancient oak roots.

But the story goes far back in time, of which no written records exist. The local historian Heinrich Börsting says: 'There is no doubt that the existence of Alst Castle 'Haus Alst' starts in the Saxon period and is far older than any other castles of Horstmar and Schagern.'. Many historians conclude this advanced age from the name 'Alst'.

The inhabitants of Alst were very early called half citizens of Horstmar. Most likely this is due to the fact that the lords of Haus Alst were Burgmanns of Horstmar at the same time and were therefore obliged by the bishop to perform military service and to defend the castle of Horstmar. As sojourners they paid half taxes and citizens were obliged to guard and other services.

=== Flag ===
The Flag of Alst is horizontally striped in the colors green and white.

== Culture and sights ==
=== Haus Alst ===
Haus Alst, first officially mentioned in 1217 AD, is a former house of a Burgmann and has been residence of the family Schorlemer-Alst. It was built on the site of an older castle and built in the Renaissance style.

=== Friedenskapelle Alst ===
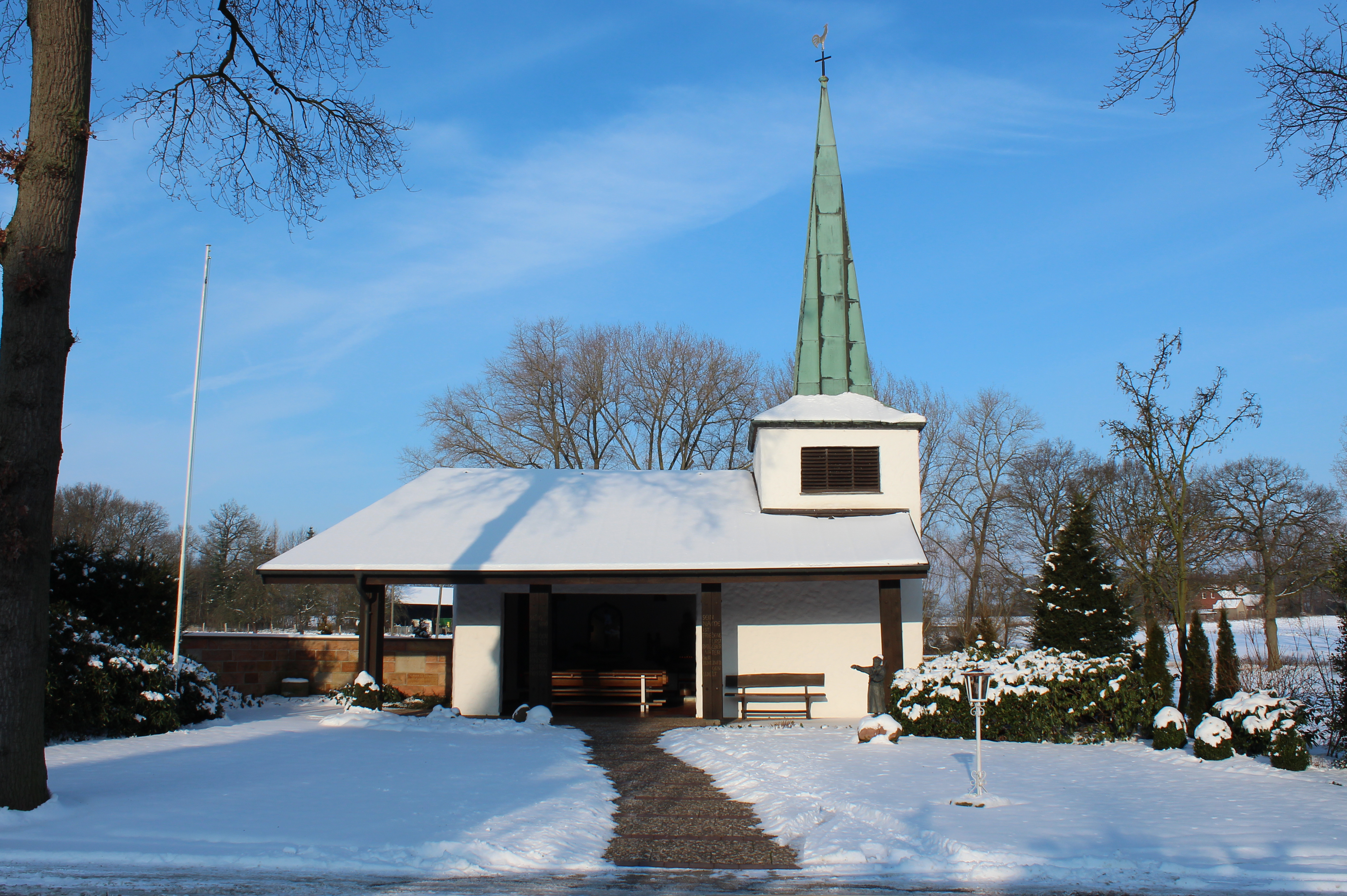
Friedenskapelle Alst (peace chapel of Alst)

Information text, available in the chapel:

The desire for peace, born of the horrors of two world wars, was the motive for the construction of this chapel. In many hours of self-performance the 260 residents of the hamlet Alst and some friends created the monument, which was inaugurated in 1967. 1988 donated the spouses Erich and Gabriele Büttner the crucifix in the middle of the front wall. The Cross is assisted by a statue of the Madonna—the Queen of Peace. The group of figures in between should tell us: 'Join hands to peace'. A stele on the left wall, built in 1985, depicts the Annunciation and the Nativity.

=== Schützenverein Alst e.V. ===
The first known documents about the Schützenverein Alst are from 1705 AD, after historians first assumed 1880 and 1830 as year of establishment. The first statutes of the association have been recorded on 11 February 1880 in five points. On November 1, 1983, four members of the Schützenverein created statues for registration at the District Court. The statues were ratified on November 12, 1983, on the Annual General Meeting of the association. Since 1984 the Schützenverein Alst organizes a Tanz in den Mai (Dance into May) annually.

Wi willt tosammen staohn
un dat wat Recht is doan
is dann een nicht naon Kopp
do fleit wat up!

(Slogan on the association's flag)

== People ==
- Burghard Freiherr von Schorlemer-Alst, Politician (1825–1895)
- Maximilian-Friedrich von Droste zu Hülshoff (1764–1840), Composer, lived and dies on Haus Alst and was buried on the cemetery of Leer near Horstmar.
