= Lauperath =

- Municipality
- Coat of arms

- Location of Lauperath within Eifelkreis Bitburg-Prüm district
- Interactive map of Lauperath
- Location within Germany Location within Rhineland-Palatinate
- Coordinates: 50°05′10″N 6°20′21″E
- Country: Germany
- State: Rhineland-Palatinate
- District: Eifelkreis Bitburg-Prüm
- Municipal assoc.: Arzfeld

Government
  - Mayor (2019–24): Roland Erschfeld

Area
  - Total: 5.77 km^{2} (2.23 sq mi)
- Elevation: 490 m (1,610 ft)

Population (2025-12-31)
  - Total: 91
  - Density: 16/km^{2} (41/sq mi)
- Time zone: UTC+01:00 (CET)
  - Summer (DST): UTC+02:00 (CEST)
- Postal codes: 54649
- Dialling codes: 06554
- Vehicle registration: BIT
- Website: www.lauperath.de

Lauperath is a municipality in the district of Bitburg-Prüm, in Rhineland-Palatinate, western Germany.
