= Hargarten =

Place in Rhineland-Palatinate, Germany

- Municipality
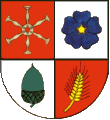
- Coat of arms

- Location of Hargarten within Eifelkreis Bitburg-Prüm district
- Interactive map of Hargarten
- Location within Germany Location within Rhineland-Palatinate
- Coordinates: 50°05′49″N 6°24′29″E
- Country: Germany
- State: Rhineland-Palatinate
- District: Eifelkreis Bitburg-Prüm
- Municipal assoc.: Arzfeld

Government
  - Mayor (2019–24): Ulrich Kockelmann

Area
  - Total: 2.00 km^{2} (0.77 sq mi)
- Elevation: 520 m (1,710 ft)

Population (2025-12-31)
  - Total: 96
  - Density: 48/km^{2} (120/sq mi)
- Time zone: UTC+01:00 (CET)
  - Summer (DST): UTC+02:00 (CEST)
- Postal codes: 54649
- Dialling codes: 06554
- Vehicle registration: BIT
- Website: www.hargarten-net.com

Hargarten is a municipality in the district of Bitburg-Prüm, in Rhineland-Palatinate, western Germany.
