= Lambertsberg =

- Municipality
- Coat of arms

- Location of Lambertsberg within Eifelkreis Bitburg-Prüm district
- Interactive map of Lambertsberg
- Location within Germany Location within Rhineland-Palatinate
- Coordinates: 50°05′29″N 6°23′24″E
- Country: Germany
- State: Rhineland-Palatinate
- District: Eifelkreis Bitburg-Prüm
- Municipal assoc.: Arzfeld

Government
  - Mayor (2019–24): Jochen Schoden

Area
  - Total: 3.66 km^{2} (1.41 sq mi)
- Elevation: 480 m (1,570 ft)

Population (2025-12-31)
  - Total: 372
  - Density: 102/km^{2} (263/sq mi)
- Time zone: UTC+01:00 (CET)
  - Summer (DST): UTC+02:00 (CEST)
- Postal codes: 54649
- Dialling codes: 06554
- Vehicle registration: BIT
- Website: www.lambertsberg.de

Lambertsberg is a municipality in the district of Bitburg-Prüm, in Rhineland-Palatinate, Germany.
