= Lichtenborn =

- Municipality
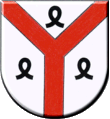
- Coat of arms

- Location of Lichtenborn within Eifelkreis Bitburg-Prüm district
- Interactive map of Lichtenborn
- Location within Germany Location within Rhineland-Palatinate
- Coordinates: 50°06′36″N 6°17′32″E
- Country: Germany
- State: Rhineland-Palatinate
- District: Eifelkreis Bitburg-Prüm
- Municipal assoc.: Arzfeld

Government
  - Mayor (2019–24): Alois Leick

Area
  - Total: 11.43 km^{2} (4.41 sq mi)
- Elevation: 548 m (1,798 ft)

Population (2025-12-31)
  - Total: 306
  - Density: 26.8/km^{2} (69.3/sq mi)
- Time zone: UTC+01:00 (CET)
  - Summer (DST): UTC+02:00 (CEST)
- Postal codes: 54619
- Dialling codes: 06554, 06559
- Vehicle registration: BIT
- Website: www.lichtenborn.de

Lichtenborn is a municipality in the district of Bitburg-Prüm, located in Rhineland-Palatinate, western Germany.
