= Dackscheid =

- Municipality
- Coat of arms

- Location of Dackscheid within Eifelkreis Bitburg-Prüm district
- Interactive map of Dackscheid
- Location within Germany Location within Rhineland-Palatinate
- Coordinates: 49°56′46.8″N 06°28′58.36″E
- Country: Germany
- State: Rhineland-Palatinate
- District: Eifelkreis Bitburg-Prüm
- Municipal assoc.: Arzfeld

Government
  - Mayor (2019–24): Matthias Knauf

Area
  - Total: 2.93 km^{2} (1.13 sq mi)
- Elevation: 240 m (790 ft)

Population (2025-12-31)
  - Total: 48
  - Density: 16/km^{2} (42/sq mi)
- Time zone: UTC+01:00 (CET)
  - Summer (DST): UTC+02:00 (CEST)
- Postal codes: 54634
- Dialling codes: 06561
- Vehicle registration: BIT
- Website: www.dackscheid.eu

Dackscheid is a municipality in the district of Bitburg-Prüm, in Rhineland-Palatinate, western Germany.
