= Merlscheid =

- Municipality
- Location of Merlscheid within Eifelkreis Bitburg-Prüm district
- Interactive map of Merlscheid
- Location within Germany Location within Rhineland-Palatinate
- Coordinates: 50°07′37″N 6°20′54″E
- Country: Germany
- State: Rhineland-Palatinate
- District: Eifelkreis Bitburg-Prüm
- Municipal assoc.: Arzfeld

Government
  - Mayor (2019–24): Thomas Schier

Area
  - Total: 3.52 km^{2} (1.36 sq mi)
- Elevation: 360–390 m (1,180–1,280 ft)

Population (2025-12-31)
  - Total: 34
  - Density: 9.7/km^{2} (25/sq mi)
- Time zone: UTC+01:00 (CET)
  - Summer (DST): UTC+02:00 (CEST)
- Postal codes: 54597
- Dialling codes: 06556
- Vehicle registration: BIT
- Website: www.merlscheid.de

Merlscheid is a municipality in the district of Bitburg-Prüm, in Rhineland-Palatinate, western Germany.
