= Altdorf, Rhineland-Palatinate =

Altdorf
- Municipality
- Location of Altdorf within Südliche Weinstraße district
- Interactive map of Altdorf
- Location within Germany Location within Rhineland-Palatinate
- Coordinates: 49°17′14″N 8°13′09″E
- Country: Germany
- State: Rhineland-Palatinate
- District: Südliche Weinstraße
- Municipal assoc.: Edenkoben

Government
  - Mayor (2019–24): Helmut Litty

Area
  - Total: 6.37 km^{2} (2.46 sq mi)
- Elevation: 122 m (400 ft)

Population (2025-12-31)
  - Total: 937
  - Density: 147/km^{2} (381/sq mi)
- Time zone: UTC+01:00 (CET)
  - Summer (DST): UTC+02:00 (CEST)
- Postal codes: 67482
- Dialling codes: 06327
- Vehicle registration: SÜW
- Website: www.altdorf-pfalz.de

Altdorf (German pronunciation: [ˈaltˌdɔʁf]) is a municipality in the Südliche Weinstraße district, in Rhineland-Palatinate, Germany.
