= Kickeshausen =

- Municipality
- Location of Kickeshausen within Eifelkreis Bitburg-Prüm district
- Interactive map of Kickeshausen
- Location within Germany Location within Rhineland-Palatinate
- Coordinates: 50°04′07″N 06°14′57″E
- Country: Germany
- State: Rhineland-Palatinate
- District: Eifelkreis Bitburg-Prüm
- Municipal assoc.: Arzfeld

Government
  - Mayor (2019–24): Albert Zimmermann

Area
  - Total: 1.53 km^{2} (0.59 sq mi)
- Elevation: 504 m (1,654 ft)

Population (2025-12-31)
  - Total: 44
  - Density: 29/km^{2} (74/sq mi)
- Time zone: UTC+01:00 (CET)
  - Summer (DST): UTC+02:00 (CEST)
- Postal codes: 54689
- Dialling codes: 06550
- Vehicle registration: BIT
- Website: www.kickeshausen.de

Kickeshausen is a municipality in the district of Bitburg-Prüm, in Rhineland-Palatinate, western Germany.
