= Euscheid =

- Municipality
- Location of Euscheid within Eifelkreis Bitburg-Prüm district
- Interactive map of Euscheid
- Location within Germany Location within Rhineland-Palatinate
- Coordinates: 50°08′05″N 6°18′23″E
- Country: Germany
- State: Rhineland-Palatinate
- District: Eifelkreis Bitburg-Prüm
- Municipal assoc.: Arzfeld

Government
  - Mayor (2019–24): Rainer Probst

Area
  - Total: 3.69 km^{2} (1.42 sq mi)
- Elevation: 471 m (1,545 ft)

Population (2025-12-31)
  - Total: 154
  - Density: 41.7/km^{2} (108/sq mi)
- Time zone: UTC+01:00 (CET)
  - Summer (DST): UTC+02:00 (CEST)
- Postal codes: 54597
- Dialling codes: 06556
- Vehicle registration: BIT
- Website: www.euscheid.de

Euscheid is a municipality in the district of Bitburg-Prüm, in Rhineland-Palatinate, Germany.
