= Daleiden =

- Municipality
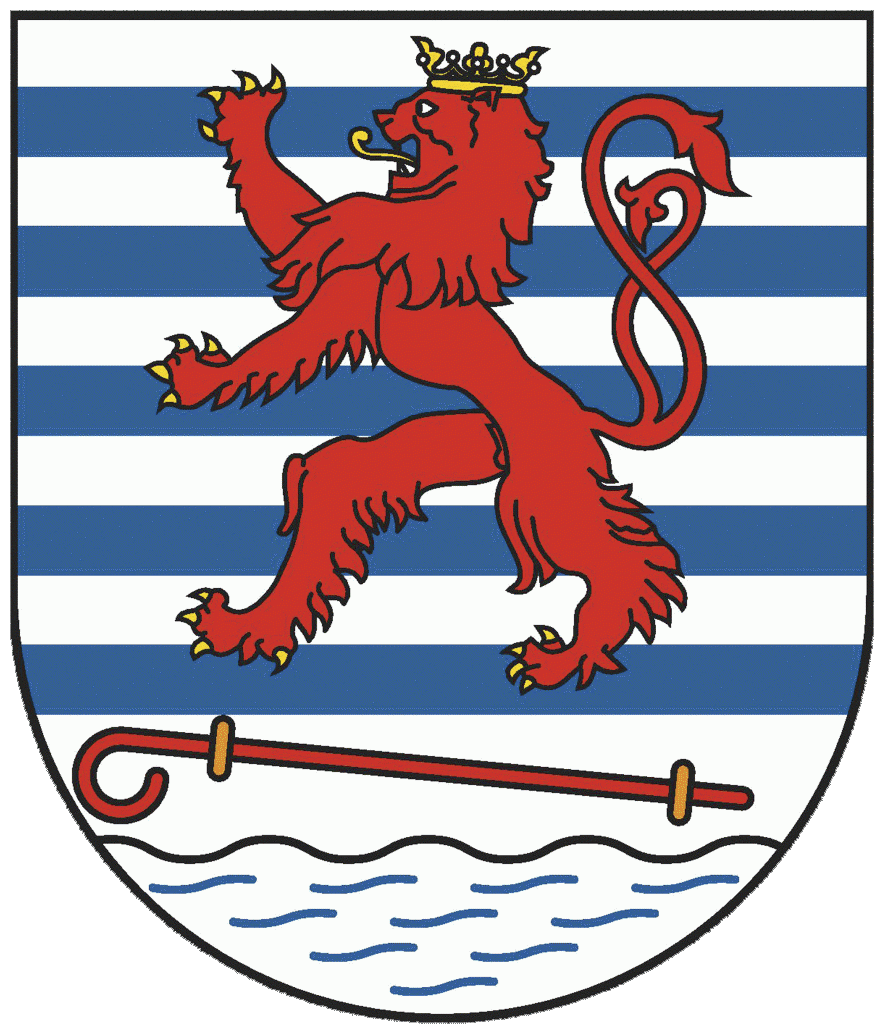
- Coat of arms

- Location of Daleiden within Eifelkreis Bitburg-Prüm district
- Interactive map of Daleiden
- Location within Germany Location within Rhineland-Palatinate
- Coordinates: 50°4′11″N 6°10′56″E
- Country: Germany
- State: Rhineland-Palatinate
- District: Eifelkreis Bitburg-Prüm
- Municipal assoc.: Arzfeld

Government
  - Mayor (2019–24): Herbert Maus

Area
  - Total: 15.59 km^{2} (6.02 sq mi)
- Elevation: 452 m (1,483 ft)

Population (2025-12-31)
  - Total: 916
  - Density: 58.8/km^{2} (152/sq mi)
- Time zone: UTC+01:00 (CET)
  - Summer (DST): UTC+02:00 (CEST)
- Postal codes: 54689
- Dialling codes: 06550
- Vehicle registration: BIT
- Website: www.daleiden.de

Daleiden is a municipality in the district of Bitburg-Prüm, in Rhineland-Palatinate, western Germany.

== Geography ==
Daleiden is located six kilometers away from the border to Luxembourg. The highest point of the village is called "Hohe Haardt" which is 505 metres high. Further parts of the municipality of Daleiden are Bermichthof, Bommert, Burtdell, Falkenauel, Feder, Kalenbornerhof, Laarberg, Neuhof, Schwabert, Vor der Höh, Zingent and Zinglersseif.
