= Irrhausen =

- Municipality
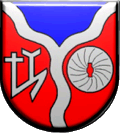
- Coat of arms

- Location of Irrhausen within Eifelkreis Bitburg-Prüm district
- Interactive map of Irrhausen
- Location within Germany Location within Rhineland-Palatinate
- Coordinates: 50°04′50″N 6°12′45″E
- Country: Germany
- State: Rhineland-Palatinate
- District: Eifelkreis Bitburg-Prüm
- Municipal assoc.: Arzfeld

Government
  - Mayor (2019–24): Edgar Krings

Area
  - Total: 7.19 km^{2} (2.78 sq mi)
- Elevation: 370 m (1,210 ft)

Population (2025-12-31)
  - Total: 220
  - Density: 31/km^{2} (79/sq mi)
- Time zone: UTC+01:00 (CET)
  - Summer (DST): UTC+02:00 (CEST)
- Postal codes: 54689
- Dialling codes: 06550
- Vehicle registration: BIT
- Website: www.irrhausen.de

Irrhausen is a municipality in the district of Bitburg-Prüm, in Rhineland-Palatinate, western Germany.
