= Lünebach =

- Municipality
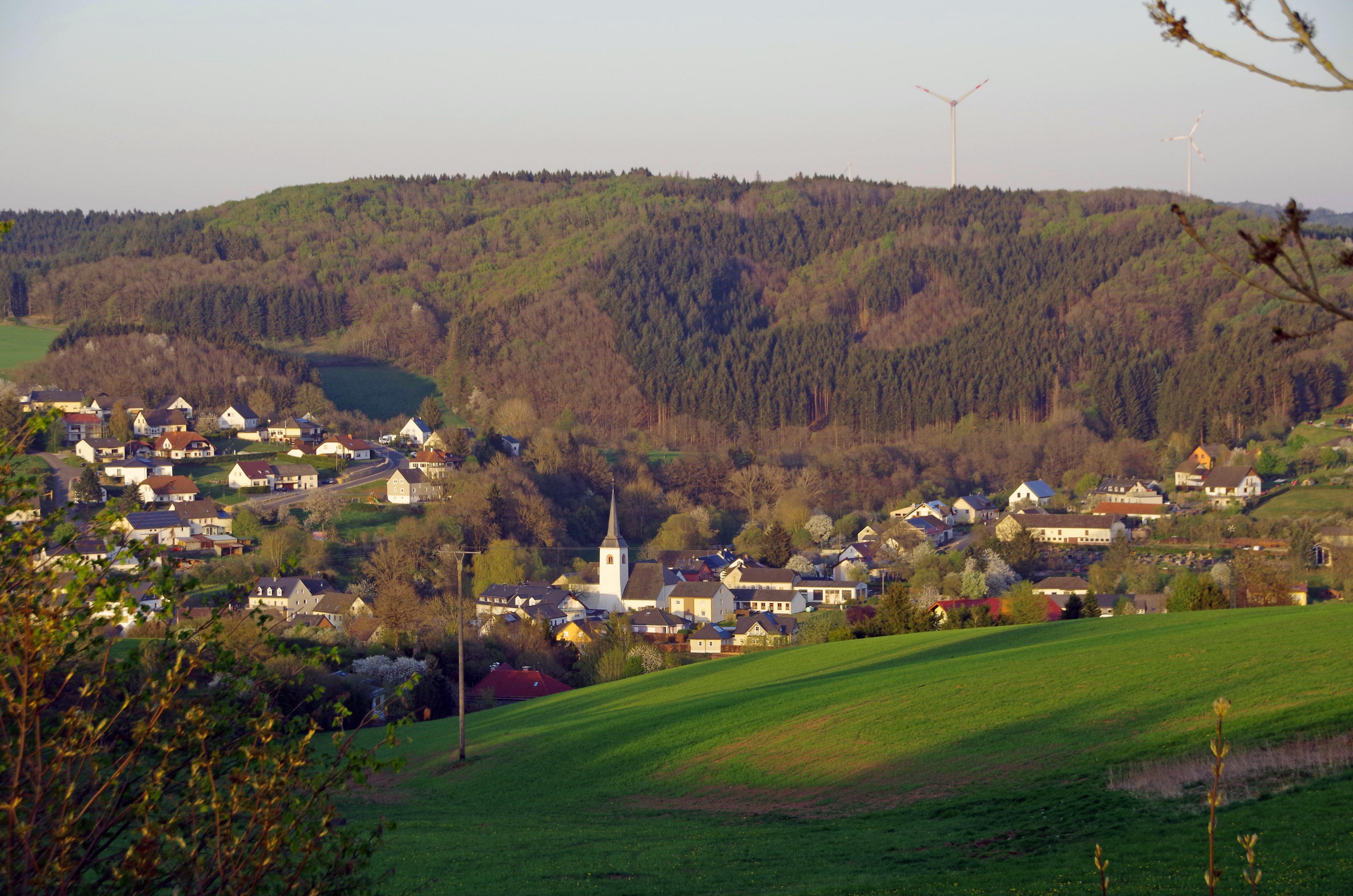

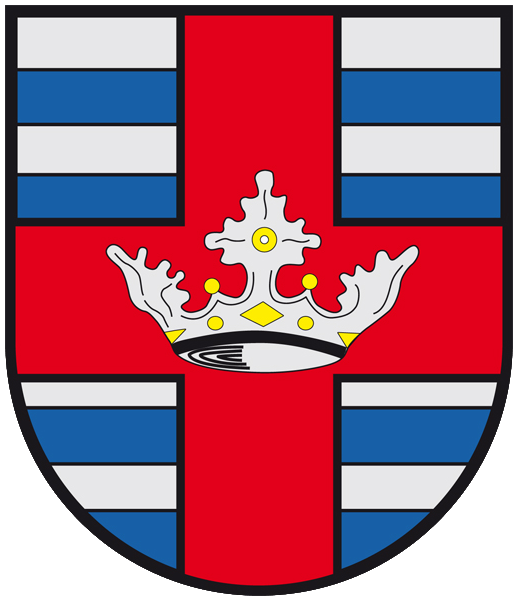
- Coat of arms

- Location of Lünebach within Eifelkreis Bitburg-Prüm district
- Interactive map of Lünebach
- Location within Germany Location within Rhineland-Palatinate
- Coordinates: 50°8′20″N 6°20′54″E
- Country: Germany
- State: Rhineland-Palatinate
- District: Eifelkreis Bitburg-Prüm
- Municipal assoc.: Arzfeld

Government
  - Mayor (2019–24): Albert Tautges

Area
  - Total: 10.27 km^{2} (3.97 sq mi)
- Elevation: 400 m (1,300 ft)

Population (2025-12-31)
  - Total: 621
  - Density: 60.5/km^{2} (157/sq mi)
- Time zone: UTC+01:00 (CET)
  - Summer (DST): UTC+02:00 (CEST)
- Postal codes: 54597
- Dialling codes: 06556
- Vehicle registration: BIT
- Website: www.luenebach.info

Lünebach is a municipality in the district of Bitburg-Prüm, in Rhineland-Palatinate, western Germany.
