= Jucken =

- Municipality
- Location of Jucken within Eifelkreis Bitburg-Prüm district
- Interactive map of Jucken
- Location within Germany Location within Rhineland-Palatinate
- Coordinates: 50°03′18″N 6°13′50″E
- Country: Germany
- State: Rhineland-Palatinate
- District: Eifelkreis Bitburg-Prüm
- Municipal assoc.: Arzfeld

Government
  - Mayor (2019–24): Franz-Josef Metz

Area
  - Total: 6.18 km^{2} (2.39 sq mi)
- Elevation: 500 m (1,600 ft)

Population (2025-12-31)
  - Total: 178
  - Density: 28.8/km^{2} (74.6/sq mi)
- Time zone: UTC+01:00 (CET)
  - Summer (DST): UTC+02:00 (CEST)
- Postal codes: 54689
- Dialling codes: 06550, 06564
- Vehicle registration: BIT
- Website: www.jucken.com

Jucken (German pronunciation: [ˈjʊkn̩]) is a municipality in the district of Bitburg-Prüm, in Rhineland-Palatinate, western Germany.
