= Krautscheid =

- Municipality
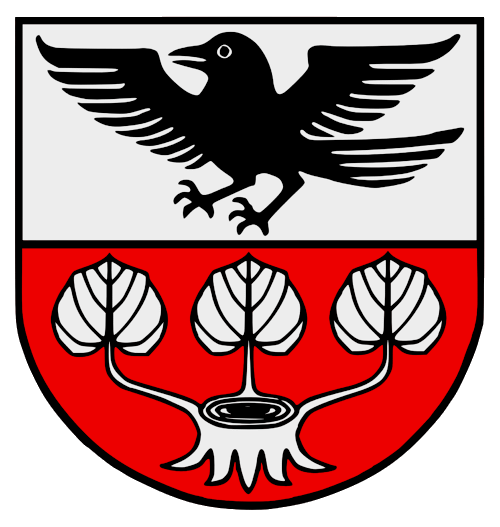
- Coat of arms

- Location of Krautscheid within Eifelkreis Bitburg-Prüm district
- Interactive map of Krautscheid
- Location within Germany Location within Rhineland-Palatinate
- Coordinates: 50°3′51″N 6°19′50″E
- Country: Germany
- State: Rhineland-Palatinate
- District: Eifelkreis Bitburg-Prüm
- Municipal assoc.: Arzfeld

Government
  - Mayor (2019–24): Peter Pusch

Area
  - Total: 8.59 km^{2} (3.32 sq mi)
- Elevation: 525 m (1,722 ft)

Population (2025-12-31)
  - Total: 196
  - Density: 22.8/km^{2} (59.1/sq mi)
- Time zone: UTC+01:00 (CET)
  - Summer (DST): UTC+02:00 (CEST)
- Postal codes: 54673
- Dialling codes: 06554
- Vehicle registration: BIT
- Website: krautscheid.com

Krautscheid is a municipality in the district of Bitburg-Prüm, in Rhineland-Palatinate, western Germany.
