= Reiff (Rhineland-Palatinate) =

- Municipality
- Location of Reiff within Eifelkreis Bitburg-Prüm district
- Interactive map of Reiff
- Location within Germany Location within Rhineland-Palatinate
- Coordinates: 50°06′04″N 06°12′50″E
- Country: Germany
- State: Rhineland-Palatinate
- District: Eifelkreis Bitburg-Prüm
- Municipal assoc.: Arzfeld

Government
  - Mayor (2019–24): Peter Wonner

Area
  - Total: 5.80 km^{2} (2.24 sq mi)
- Elevation: 510 m (1,670 ft)

Population (2025-12-31)
  - Total: 57
  - Density: 9.8/km^{2} (25/sq mi)
- Time zone: UTC+01:00 (CET)
  - Summer (DST): UTC+02:00 (CEST)
- Postal codes: 54619
- Dialling codes: 06559
- Vehicle registration: BIT
- Website: www.reiff-net.de

Reiff is a municipality in the district of Bitburg-Prüm, in Rhineland-Palatinate, western Germany.
