= Lierfeld =

- Municipality
- Location of Lierfeld within Eifelkreis Bitburg-Prüm district
- Interactive map of Lierfeld
- Location within Germany Location within Rhineland-Palatinate
- Coordinates: 50°08′10″N 06°21′23″E
- Country: Germany
- State: Rhineland-Palatinate
- District: Eifelkreis Bitburg-Prüm
- Municipal assoc.: Arzfeld

Government
  - Mayor (2019–24): Heinz Müsch

Area
  - Total: 1.71 km^{2} (0.66 sq mi)
- Elevation: 420 m (1,380 ft)

Population (2025-12-31)
  - Total: 82
  - Density: 48/km^{2} (120/sq mi)
- Time zone: UTC+01:00 (CET)
  - Summer (DST): UTC+02:00 (CEST)
- Postal codes: 54597
- Dialling codes: 06556
- Vehicle registration: BIT
- Website: www.lierfeld.com

Lierfeld is a municipality in the district of Bitburg-Prüm, in Rhineland-Palatinate, western Germany.
