= Arzfeld =

Municipality in Germany

- Municipality
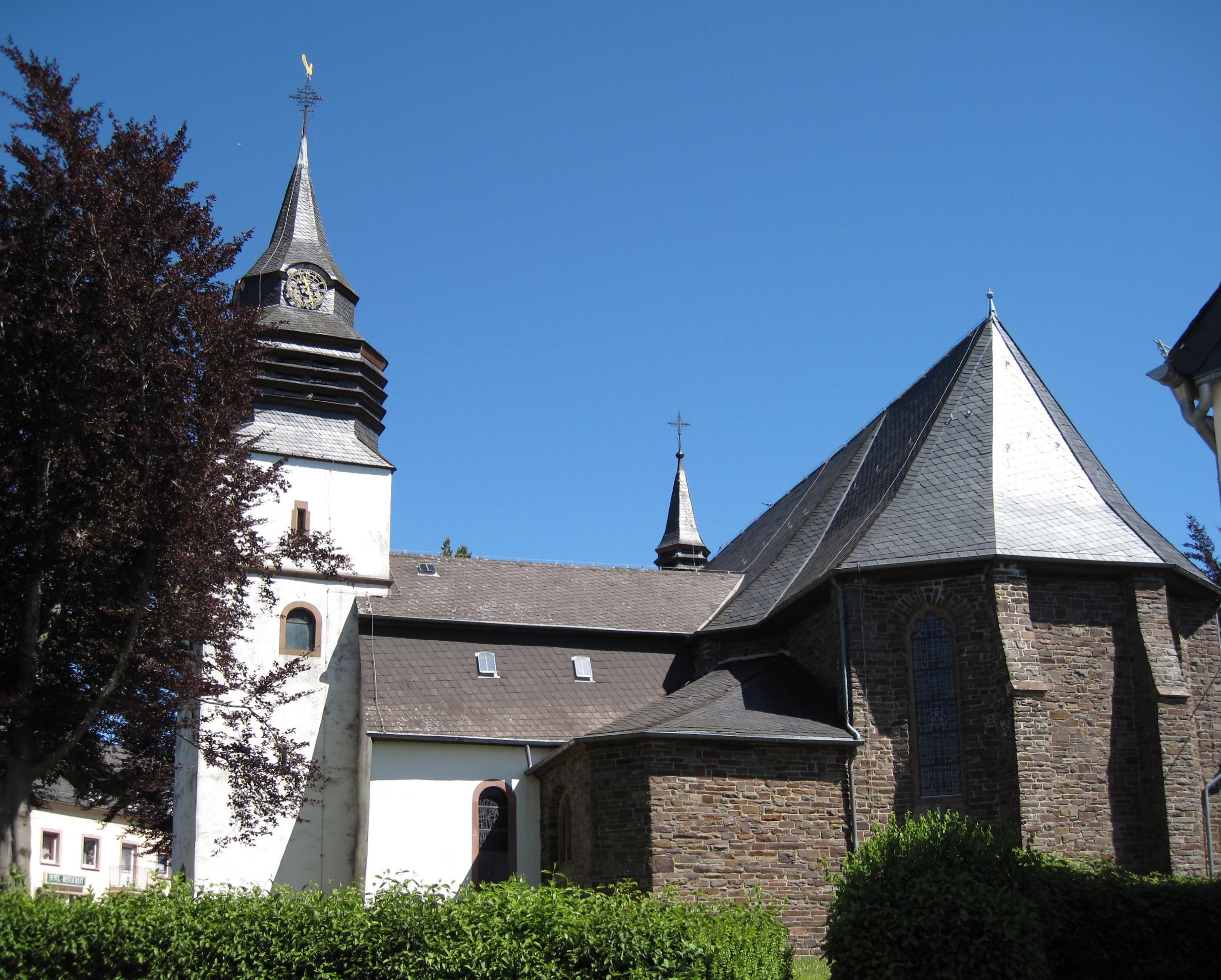

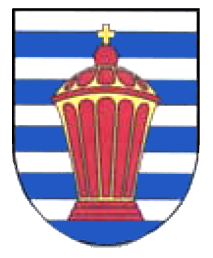
- Coat of arms

- Location of Arzfeld within Eifelkreis Bitburg-Prüm district
- Interactive map of Arzfeld
- Location within Germany Location within Rhineland-Palatinate
- Coordinates: 50°5′20″N 6°16′31″E
- Country: Germany
- State: Rhineland-Palatinate
- District: Eifelkreis Bitburg-Prüm
- Municipal assoc.: Arzfeld

Government
  - Mayor (2019–24): Walter Heinisch (CDU)

Area
  - Total: 19.38 km^{2} (7.48 sq mi)
- Elevation: 490 m (1,610 ft)

Population (2025-12-31)
  - Total: 1,467
  - Density: 75.70/km^{2} (196.1/sq mi)
- Time zone: UTC+01:00 (CET)
  - Summer (DST): UTC+02:00 (CEST)
- Postal codes: 54687
- Dialling codes: 06550
- Vehicle registration: BIT
- Website: www.vg-arzfeld.de

Arzfeld is a municipality in the district Bitburg-Prüm, in Rhineland-Palatinate, Germany. It is situated in the Eifel, near the border with Luxembourg, approximately 20 km north-west of Bitburg and 25 km south-east of Sankt-Vith.

Arzfeld is the seat of the Verbandsgemeinde ("collective municipality") Arzfeld. The Church of St. Luzia is located here.
