= Lascheid =

- Municipality
- Location of Lascheid within Eifelkreis Bitburg-Prüm district
- Interactive map of Lascheid
- Location within Germany Location within Rhineland-Palatinate
- Coordinates: 50°06′35″N 6°24′34″E
- Country: Germany
- State: Rhineland-Palatinate
- District: Eifelkreis Bitburg-Prüm
- Municipal assoc.: Arzfeld

Government
  - Mayor (2019–24): Thomas Colles

Area
  - Total: 3.47 km^{2} (1.34 sq mi)
- Elevation: 530 m (1,740 ft)

Population (2025-12-31)
  - Total: 80
  - Density: 23/km^{2} (60/sq mi)
- Time zone: UTC+01:00 (CET)
  - Summer (DST): UTC+02:00 (CEST)
- Postal codes: 54597
- Dialling codes: 06554
- Vehicle registration: BIT
- Website: www.lascheid.net

Lascheid is a municipality in the district of Bitburg-Prüm, in Rhineland-Palatinate, western Germany.

== Geography ==
The site is located on a high altitude on a ridge in eastern Islek, which is counted to the southern Eifel . The state border with Luxembourg is about 20 km west of the village. Lascheid also includes a part of the hamlet Gesotz. 59.5% of the municipal area are used for agriculture, 35.6% are forest (status 2012).

To the community border Dackscheid in the north, Lasel in the east, Hargarten in the south and Waxweiler and Pintesfeld in the west.

== History ==
The place probably has its origins in the medieval clearing phases. In 1540 he was first mentioned as "Lasscheid". Until the end of the 18th century Lascheid belonged to the condominium Pronsfeld. In the French rule he was managed by the Mairie Waxweiler, in the Prussian era by the mayor Waxweiler in Prüm.
