= Roscheid =

- Municipality
- Location of Roscheid within Eifelkreis Bitburg-Prüm district
- Interactive map of Roscheid
- Location within Germany Location within Rhineland-Palatinate
- Coordinates: 50°07′24″N 6°11′20″E
- Country: Germany
- State: Rhineland-Palatinate
- District: Eifelkreis Bitburg-Prüm
- Municipal assoc.: Arzfeld

Government
  - Mayor (2019–24): Günter Nickels

Area
  - Total: 5.13 km^{2} (1.98 sq mi)
- Elevation: 510 m (1,670 ft)

Population (2025-12-31)
  - Total: 49
  - Density: 9.6/km^{2} (25/sq mi)
- Time zone: UTC+01:00 (CET)
  - Summer (DST): UTC+02:00 (CEST)
- Postal codes: 54619
- Dialling codes: 06559
- Vehicle registration: BIT
- Website: https://roscheid.de/

Roscheid is a municipality in the district of Bitburg-Prüm, in Rhineland-Palatinate, western Germany.
