= Eilscheid =

- Municipality
- Location of Eilscheid within Eifelkreis Bitburg-Prüm district
- Interactive map of Eilscheid
- Location within Germany Location within Rhineland-Palatinate
- Coordinates: 50°07′46″N 06°23′13″E
- Country: Germany
- State: Rhineland-Palatinate
- District: Eifelkreis Bitburg-Prüm
- Municipal assoc.: Arzfeld

Government
  - Mayor (2019–24): Lothar Pütz

Area
  - Total: 2.38 km^{2} (0.92 sq mi)
- Elevation: 521 m (1,709 ft)

Population (2025-12-31)
  - Total: 45
  - Density: 19/km^{2} (49/sq mi)
- Time zone: UTC+01:00 (CET)
  - Summer (DST): UTC+02:00 (CEST)
- Postal codes: 54649
- Dialling codes: 06654
- Vehicle registration: BIT
- Website: www.eilscheid.de

Eilscheid is a municipality in the district of Bitburg-Prüm, in Rhineland-Palatinate, western Germany.
