= Kinzenburg =

- Municipality
- Location of Kinzenburg within Eifelkreis Bitburg-Prüm district
- Interactive map of Kinzenburg
- Location within Germany Location within Rhineland-Palatinate
- Coordinates: 50°07′13″N 06°20′25″E
- Country: Germany
- State: Rhineland-Palatinate
- District: Eifelkreis Bitburg-Prüm
- Municipal assoc.: Arzfeld

Government
  - Mayor (2019–24): Michael Kandels

Area
  - Total: 1.22 km^{2} (0.47 sq mi)
- Elevation: 400 m (1,300 ft)

Population (2025-12-31)
  - Total: 50
  - Density: 41/km^{2} (110/sq mi)
- Time zone: UTC+01:00 (CET)
  - Summer (DST): UTC+02:00 (CEST)
- Postal codes: 54597
- Dialling codes: 06554
- Vehicle registration: BIT
- Website: www.kinzenburg.de

Kinzenburg (German pronunciation: [ˈkɪntsn̩ˌbʊʁk]) is a municipality in the district of Bitburg-Prüm, in Rhineland-Palatinate, western Germany.

It has had the following population in various censuses since 1815:

- 1815 – 50
- 1835 – 70
- 1871 – 70
- 1905 – 73
- 1939 – 80
- 1950 – 75
- 1961 – 59
- 1965 – 63
- 1970 – 62
- 1975 – 58
- 1980 – 58
- 1985 – 64
- 1987 – 56
- 1990 – 48
- 1995 – 42
- 2000 – 39
- 2005 – 40

Data source: Statistisches Landesamt Rheinland-Pfalz
