= Großkampenberg =

- Municipality
- Coat of arms

- Location of Großkampenberg within Eifelkreis Bitburg-Prüm district
- Interactive map of Großkampenberg
- Location within Germany Location within Rhineland-Palatinate
- Coordinates: 50°9′36″N 6°12′42″E
- Country: Germany
- State: Rhineland-Palatinate
- District: Eifelkreis Bitburg-Prüm
- Municipal assoc.: Arzfeld

Government
  - Mayor (2019–24): Bertram Ademes

Area
  - Total: 6.31 km^{2} (2.44 sq mi)
- Elevation: 525 m (1,722 ft)

Population (2025-12-31)
  - Total: 135
  - Density: 21.4/km^{2} (55.4/sq mi)
- Time zone: UTC+01:00 (CET)
  - Summer (DST): UTC+02:00 (CEST)
- Postal codes: 54619
- Dialling codes: 06559
- Vehicle registration: BIT
- Website: www.grosskampenberg.de

Großkampenberg is a municipality in the district of Bitburg-Prüm, in Rhineland-Palatinate, western Germany.
