= Lützkampen =

- Municipality
- Coat of arms

- Location of Lützkampen within Eifelkreis Bitburg-Prüm district
- Interactive map of Lützkampen
- Location within Germany Location within Rhineland-Palatinate
- Coordinates: 50°08′49″N 6°11′11″E
- Country: Germany
- State: Rhineland-Palatinate
- District: Eifelkreis Bitburg-Prüm
- Municipal assoc.: Arzfeld

Government
  - Mayor (2019–24): Manfred Müller

Area
  - Total: 10.98 km^{2} (4.24 sq mi)
- Elevation: 510 m (1,670 ft)

Population (2025-12-31)
  - Total: 340
  - Density: 31/km^{2} (80/sq mi)
- Time zone: UTC+01:00 (CET)
  - Summer (DST): UTC+02:00 (CEST)
- Postal codes: 54617
- Dialling codes: 06559
- Vehicle registration: BIT
- Website: www.luetzkampen.de

Lützkampen is a municipality in the district of Bitburg-Prüm, in Rhineland-Palatinate, western Germany.
