= Herzfeld =

- Municipality
- Location of Herzfeld within Eifelkreis Bitburg-Prüm district
- Interactive map of Herzfeld
- Location within Germany Location within Rhineland-Palatinate
- Coordinates: 50°07′59″N 06°12′34″E
- Country: Germany
- State: Rhineland-Palatinate
- District: Eifelkreis Bitburg-Prüm
- Municipal assoc.: Arzfeld

Government
  - Mayor (2019–24): Edgar Richarz

Area
  - Total: 2.67 km^{2} (1.03 sq mi)
- Elevation: 499 m (1,637 ft)

Population (2025-12-31)
  - Total: 35
  - Density: 13/km^{2} (34/sq mi)
- Time zone: UTC+01:00 (CET)
  - Summer (DST): UTC+02:00 (CEST)
- Postal codes: 54619
- Dialling codes: 06559
- Vehicle registration: BIT
- Website: www.herzfeld-net.de

Herzfeld is a municipality in the district of Bitburg-Prüm, in Rhineland-Palatinate, western Germany.
