= German Volcano Route =

Tourist route from the River Rhine to the mountains of the High Eifel

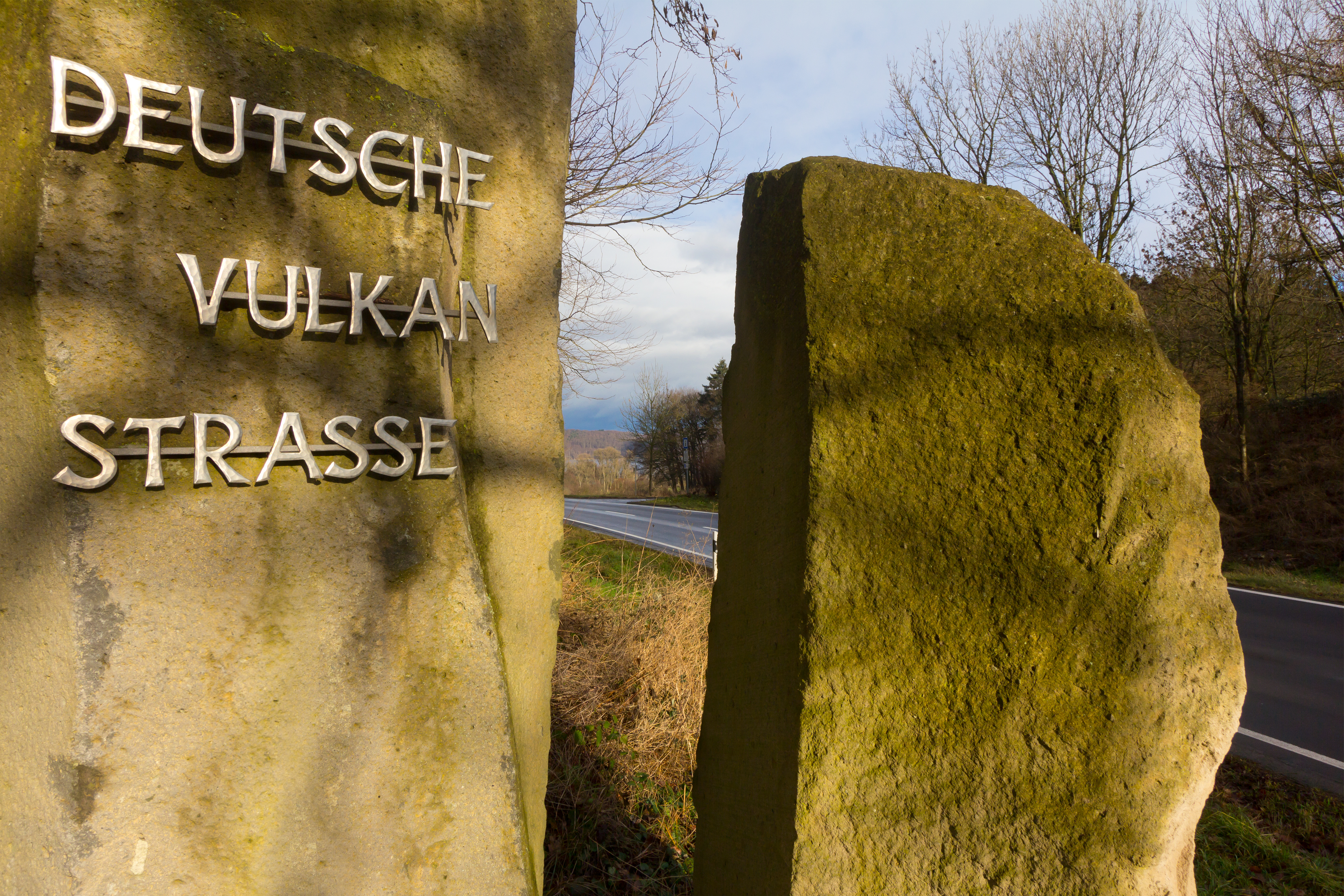
Start point of the German Volcano Route just before Station 1 with a view of the Laacher See

The German Volcano Route or, less commonly, German Volcano Road (German: Deutsche Vulkanstraße) is a 280-kilometre-long tourist route from the River Rhine to the mountains of the High Eifel. It links 39 sites within the Geopark Vulkanland Eifel in the Volcanic Eifel (Vulkaneifel), at which geological, cultural-historical and industrial-historical nature and cultural monuments on the subject of volcanicity in the Eifel are located.

The project was carried out in 2008 in cooperation between the counties of Ahrweiler, Bernkastel-Wittlich, Cochem-Zell, Mayen-Koblenz and Vulkaneifel. The choice of the 39 stations was made by the German Vulcanology Society (Deutsche Vulkanologische Gesellschaft, DVG).

== Route ==
Station	Name	Image
Station 1	Car park at Erntekreuz with a view of the Laacher See	
Station 2	Maria Laach Abbey, Glees	
Station 3	Eppelsberg, cinder cone	
Station 4	Roman mine, Meurin, near Kruft	
Station 5	Rauschermühle information centre	
Station 6	German Volcano Museum, Mendig – Lava Dome, Mendig	
Station 7	Wingertsbergwand	
Station 8	Mayener Grubenfeld	
Station 9	Slip fold, Dachsbusch, Glees	
Station 10	Devonian Terrace, Kurfürstenbrunnen well and Angelika Spring	
Station 11	Trasshöhlen (caves)	
Station 12	Bausenberg, horseshoe crater near Niederzissen	
Station 13	Brohltal/Laacher See Volcano Park (Vulkanpark Brohltal/Laacher See) information centre in Niederzissen	
Station 14	Tuff Rock Centre (Tuffsteinzentrum), Weibern	
Station 15	Hohe Acht (746,9 m), highest mountain in the Eifel	
Station 16	Stone quarry at Raustert	
Station 17	Mosbrucher Weiher (pond)	
Station 18	Ulmener Maar	
Station 19	Volcano Platform, Steineberg	
Station 20	Thermal springs and Käse Grotto (Käsegrotte), Bad Bertrich	
Station 21	Immerather Maar (maar lake)	
Station 22	Pulvermaar	
Station 23	Volcano House, Strohn (Vulkanhaus Strohn)	
Station 24	Holzmaar (maar lake)	
Station 25	Dürres Maar and Hitsche Maar	
Station 26	Weinfelder Maar	
Station 27	Gemündener Maar	
Station 28	Volcano Museum, Daun (Vulkanmuseum Daun)	
Station 29	Dreiser Weiher	
Station 30	Basalt intrusion, Arensberg	
Station 31	Palagonite tuff ring and volcano garden, Steffeln	
Station 32	Mühlstein Caves in the Rother Kopf (Eis)	
Station 33	Papenkaule and Hagelskaule near Gerolstein	
Station 34	Stone runs, Hundsbach valley	
Station 35	Kaltwasser Geyser Wallender Born in Wallenborn	
Station 36	Meerfelder Maar	
Station 37	Mosenberg Reihenvulkan and Hinkelsmaar	
Station 38	Maar Museum, Manderscheid	
Station 39	Rock folds in the basement near Manderscheid	

== Literature ==
- Overview map 1:100,000 series, State Office for Survey and Geobasis Information (Landesamt für Vermessung and Geobasisinformation) Rheinland-Pfalz, ISBN 3-89637-368-4
- d´Hein: Nationaler Geopark Vulkanland Eifel. Ein Natur- and Kulturführer. Gaasterland-Verlag, Düsseldorf, 2006, ISBN 3-935873-15-8
- Wolfgang Blum, Wilhelm Meyer: Deutsche Vulkanstraße. Görres Verlag, Koblenz, 2006, ISBN 3-935690-53-3
