= Maar =

Low-relief volcanic crater

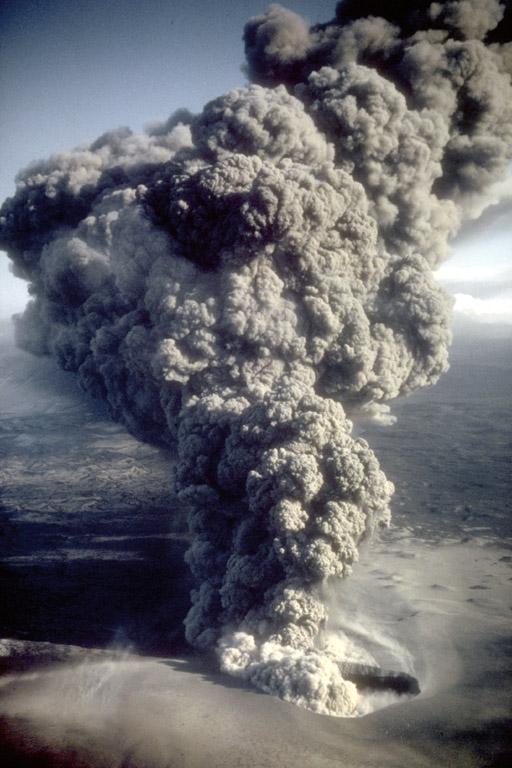
The ten-day phreatomagmatic eruption that formed the Ukinrek maars

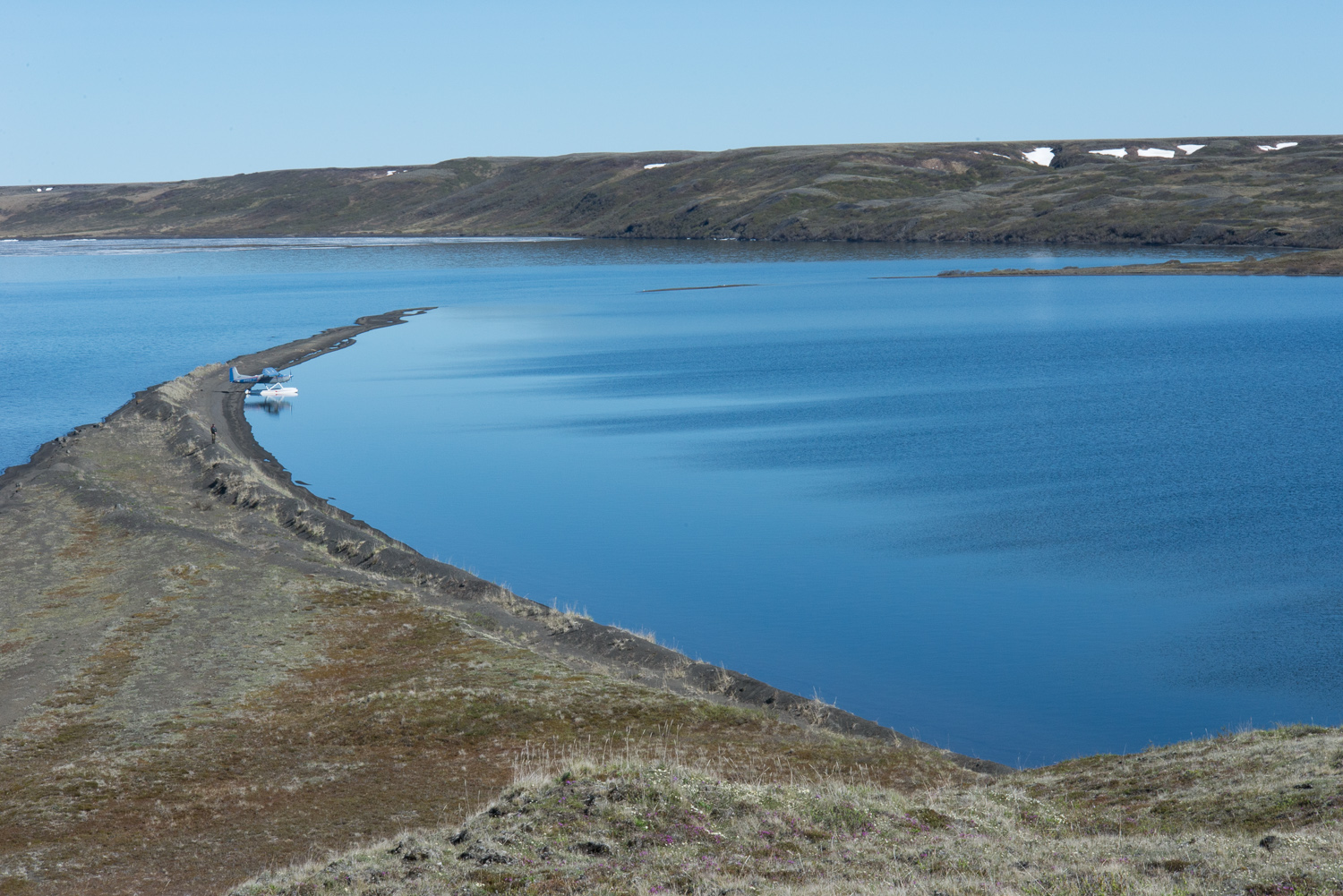
The Devil Mountain Lakes on the Seward Peninsula in western Alaska – the largest maar-based lakes in the world

A maar /mɑːr/ is a broad, low-relief volcanic crater caused by a phreatomagmatic eruption (an explosion which occurs when groundwater comes into contact with hot lava or magma). A maar characteristically fills with water to form a relatively shallow crater lake, which may also be called a maar.

Maars generally range in size from 20 to 3,000 m (66 to 9,800 ft) across and from 5 to 200 m (20 to 700 ft) deep. Most maars fill with water to form natural lakes. Most maars have low rims composed of a mixture of loose fragments of volcanic rocks and rocks torn from the walls of the diatreme.

== Etymology ==
The name maar comes from a Moselle Franconian dialect word used for the circular lakes of the Daun area of Germany. The word evolved from its first use in German in the modern geological sense in 1819 and is now used in English and in the geological sciences as the term for the explosion crater, even if water from rainfall might always have drained from the crater after the formation event. This extension in meaning was due to recognising that the lake may no longer exist. Since maar lakes are formed after initially ground or subsurface water interacts with a magma intrusion to create an explosion crater, the name came to be used for the crater type as well. (Note: Notes: Sebastian Münster (1488–1552) first applied the word "maar" (as Marh) to the Ulmener Maar and the Laacher See in his 1544 book Cosmographia. See: Sebastian Münster, Cosmographia (Basel, Switzerland: Heinrich Petri, 1544), p. 341. From p. 341: "Item zwen namhafftiger seen seind in der Eyfel / einer bey de schloß Ulmen / und ein ander bey dem Closter züm Laich / die seind sere tieff / habe kein ynflüß aber vil außflüß / die nennet man Marh unnd seind fischreich." (Also two noteworthy lakes are in the Eifel, one by the Ulmen castle, and another by the monastery at Laich; they are very deep; [they] have no streams flowing in but many flowing out; one calls them "maars" and [they] are rich in fish.); In 1819, Johann Steininger (1794–1874), a secondary-school teacher from Trier, coined the term "maar" in its modern sense. See: Steininger, J., Geognostische Studien am Mittelrhein [Geological studies on the middle Rhein] (Mainz, (Germany): Kupferberg, 1819).; In 1825, George Julius Poulett Scrope (1797–1876) introduced the term "maar" into English. See: Scrope, G.P., Considerations on Volcanoes (London, England: Philipps, 1825), p. 166.; Horst Noll, a geologist at the University of Köln (Cologne), Germany, said that the local term maar might even have derived from the Latin word mare (i.e. sea) and been introduced into local language during the Roman occupation of the West Eifel. See: Noll, H. (1967) "Maare und Maar-ähnliche Explosionskrater in Island. Ein Vergleich mit dem Maar-Vulkanismus der Eifel" (Maars and maar-like explosion craters in Iceland. A comparison with the maar-volcanism of the Eifel.), Special publication of the Geological Institute of the University of Köln, p. 1.; Wilhelm Meyer, Geologie der Eifel [Geology of the Eifel] (Stuttgart, Germany: Schweizerbart'sche Verlagsbuchhandlung, 1986), p. 311.; Herbert Lutz and Volker Lorenz (2013) "Early volcanological research in the Vulkaneifel, Germany, the classic region of maar–diatreme volcanoes: the years 1774–1865." On-line publication of Springer International Publishing, Berlin, Germany.; The American Heritage Dictionary states that the word "maar" derives from the Latin mare (sea), as does the German language Universal Lexikon.) The present definition of the term relates to both its common and scientific discourse use in language over two centuries. Depending upon context there may be other descriptors available to use in the geological sciences such as the term tuff ring or maar-diatreme volcanoes. These last are volcanoes produced by explosive eruptions that cut deeply into the country rock with the maar being "the crater cut into the ground and surrounded by an ejecta ring". A 2011 geological clarification of a maar is "Maar volcanoes are distinguished from other small volcanoes in having craters with their floor lying below the pre-eruptive surface".

== Maar lakes and dry maars ==
Maar lakes, also referred to simply as maars, occur when groundwater or precipitation fills the funnel-shaped and usually round hollow of the maar depression formed by volcanic explosions. Examples of these types of maar are the three maars at Daun in the Eifel mountains of Germany.

A dry maar results when a maar lake dries out, becomes aggraded or silted up. An example of the latter is the Eckfelder Maar. Near Steffeln is the Eichholzmaar (also called the Gussweiher) which has dried out during the last century and is being renaturalised into a maar. In some cases the underlying rock is so porous that maar lakes are unable to form. After winters of heavy snow and rainfall many dry maars fill partially and temporarily with water; others contain small bogs or often artificial ponds that, however, only occupy part of the hollow.

== Distribution ==
The largest known maars are found at Espenberg on the Seward Peninsula in northwest Alaska. These maars range in size from 4 to 8 km (2.5 to 5.0 mi) in diameter and a depth up to 300 m (980 ft). These eruptions occurred in a period of about 100,000 years, with the youngest (the Devil Mountain Maar) occurring about 17,500 years ago. Their large size is due to the explosive reaction that occurs when magma comes into contact with permafrost. Hydromagmatic eruptions are increasingly explosive when the ratio of water to magma is low. Since permafrost melts slowly, it provides a steady source of water to the eruption while keeping the water to magma ratio low. This produces the prolonged, explosive eruptions that created these large maars. Examples of the Seward Peninsula maars include North Killeak Maar, South Killeak Maar, Devil Mountain Maar and Whitefish Maar.

Maars occur in western North America, Patagonia in South America, the Eifel region of Germany (where they were originally described), and in other geologically young volcanic regions of Earth. Elsewhere in Europe, La Vestide du Pal, a maar in the Ardèche department of France, is easily visible from the ground or air. Kilbourne Hole and Hunt's Hole, in southern New Mexico near El Paso, Texas, are maars. The Crocodile Lake in Los Baños in the Philippines, though originally thought to be a volcanic crater, is a maar. The carbon dioxide-saturated Lake Nyos in northwestern Cameroon is another example, as is Zuñi Salt Lake in New Mexico, a shallow saline lake that occupies a flat-floored crater about 6,500 ft (2,000 m) across and 400 ft (120 m) deep. Its low rim is composed of loose pieces of basaltic lava and wall rocks (sandstone, shale, limestone) of the underlying diatreme, as well as chunks of ancient crystalline rocks blasted upward from great depths. Maars in Canada are found in the Wells Gray-Clearwater volcanic field of east-central British Columbia and in kimberlite fields throughout Canada. Another field of maars is found in the Pali-Aike Volcanic Field in Patagonia, South America. and in the Sudanese Bayuda Volcanic Field. The Auckland volcanic field in the urban area of Auckland, New Zealand, has several maars, including the readily accessible Lake Pupuke in the North Shore suburb of Takapuna.

Arizona's Meteor Crater was for many years thought to be a maar of volcanic origin but it is now known to be an impact crater.

=== Germany ===
==== Eifel maars ====
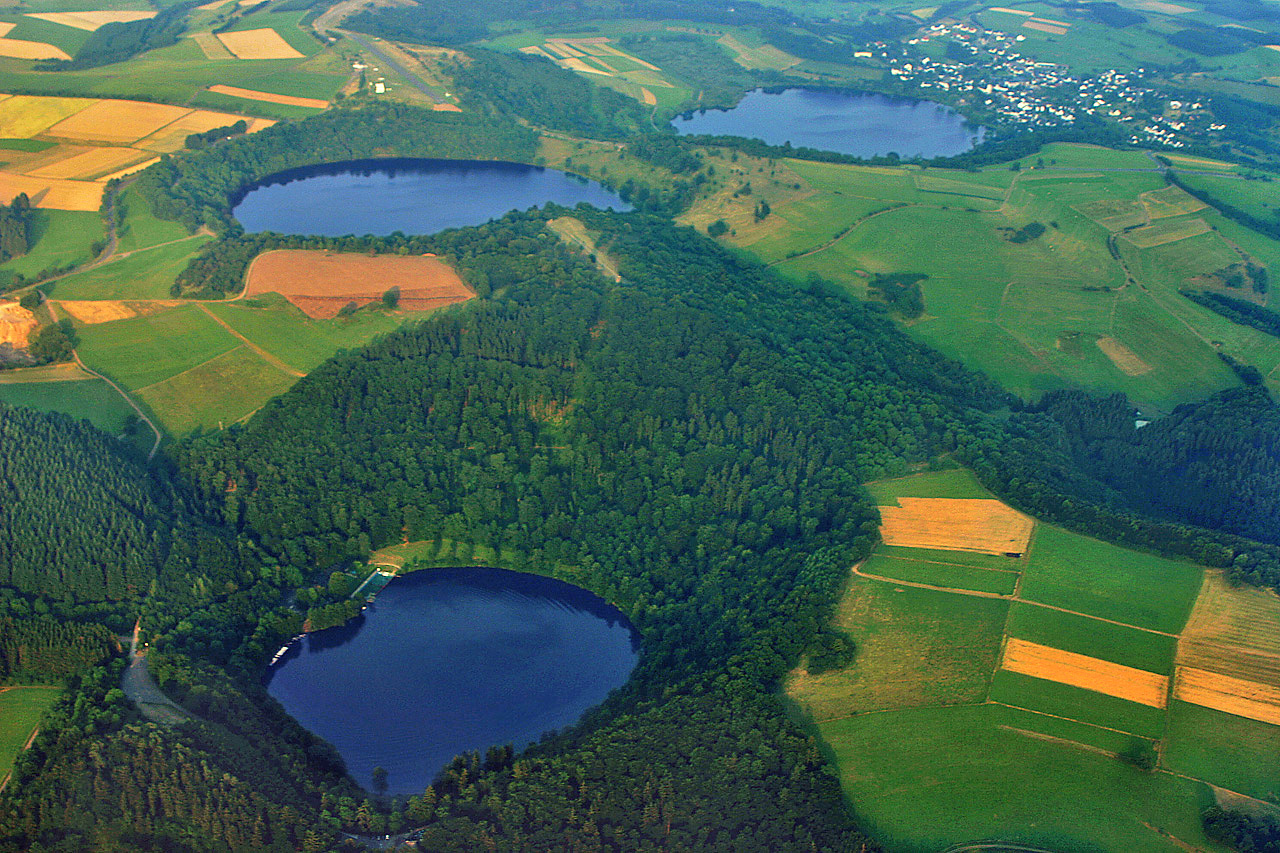
The three maars at Daun (from front to rear): the Gemündener, Weinfelder and Schalkenmehrener Maar

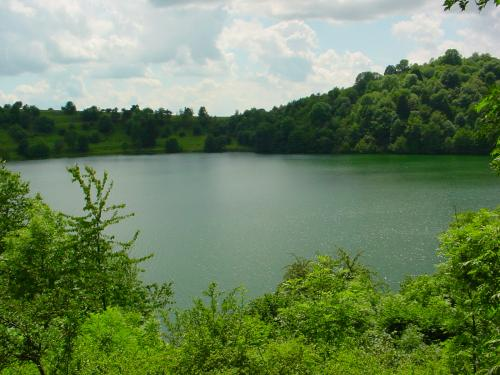
Weinfelder Maar

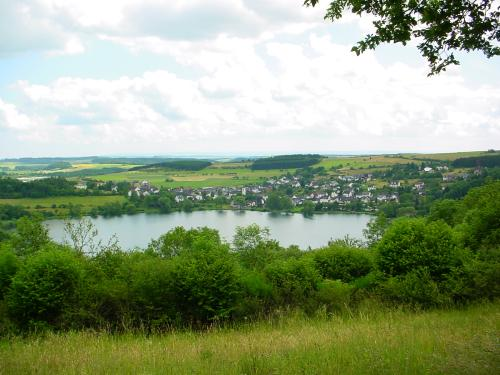
Schalkenmehrener Maar

In the Volcanic Eifel there are about 75 maars. Both lake-filled and dry maars are typical, though the latter are more common. The last eruptions took place at least 11,000 years ago, and many maars are older, as evidenced by their heavy erosion and less obvious shapes and volcanic features.

===== Water-filled maars of the Eifel =====
Name Geo-coordinates	Location near/between	Area in ha	Depth in m	Remarks
Eichholzmaar (50°16′19″N 6°33′54″E)	Duppach, Steffeln	1.1	3.2	Smallest permanent Eifel maar lake
Gemündener Maar (50°10′39″N 6°50′11″E)	Gemünden	7.2	39.0	
Holzmaar (50°7′9″N 6°52′43″E)	Eckfeld, Gillenfeld	6.8	21.0	Crossed by a stream
Immerather Maar (50°7′19″N 6°57′31″E)	Immerath, Strotzbüsch	6.0	2.9	Shallowest of all Eifel maar lakes
Meerfelder Maar (50°6′2″N 6°45′23″E)	Deudesfeld, Meerfeld	24.0	17.0	
Pulvermaar (50°7′52″N 6°55′34″E)	Gillenfeld, Immerath	38.48	72.0	Deepest and largest maar lake in Germany
Schalkenmehrener Maar (50°10′10″N 6°51′29″E)	Gemünden, Schalkenmehren	21.6	21.0	
Ulmener Maar (50°12′36″N 6°58′59″E)	Ulmen	6.0	37.0	Most recent maar in the Eifel
Weinfelder Maar (50°10′35″N 6°51′1″E)	Gemünden, Schalkenmehren	16.8	51.0	Also called the Totenmaar

===== Dry maars of the Eifel =====
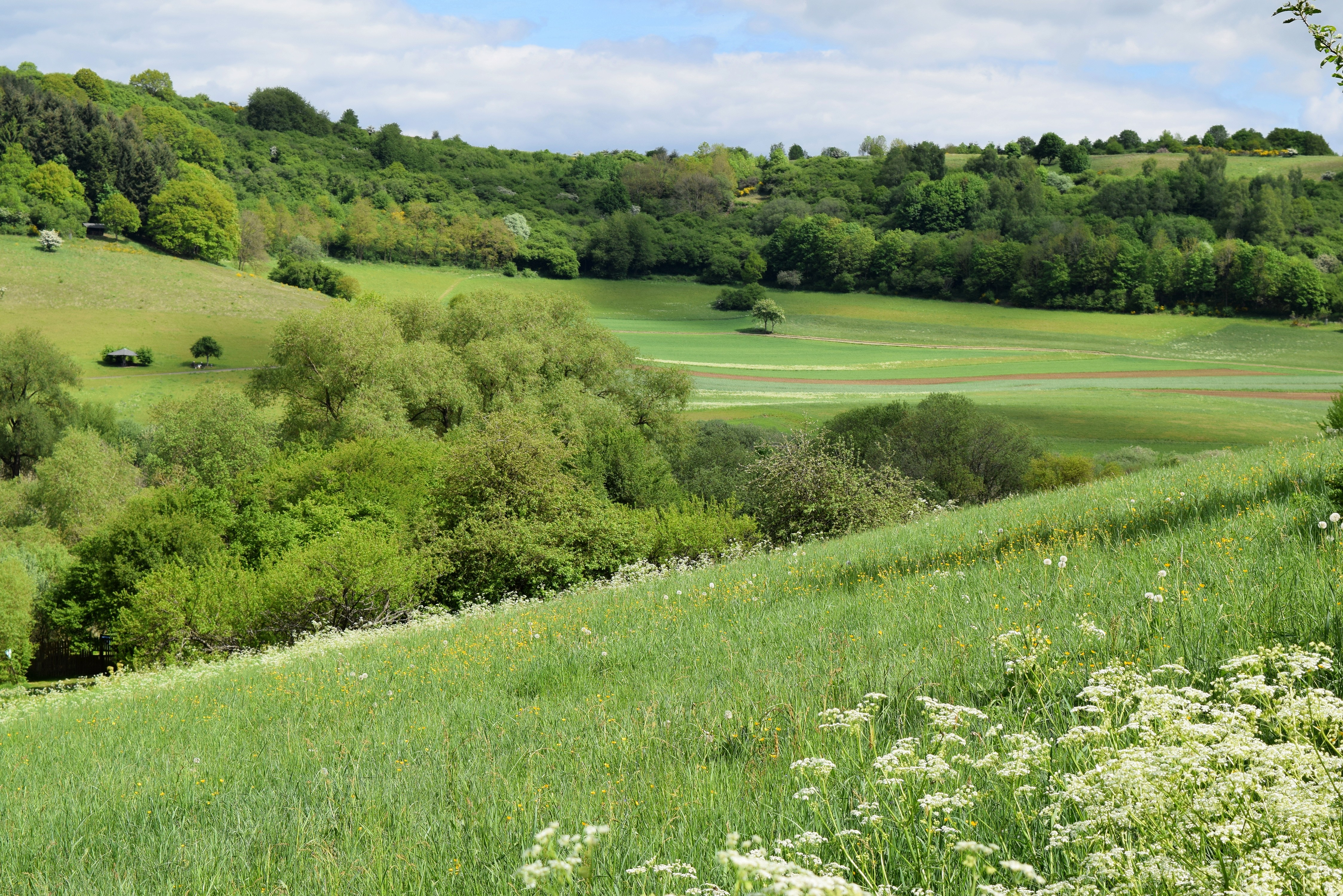
Schalkenmehrener "dry" Maar

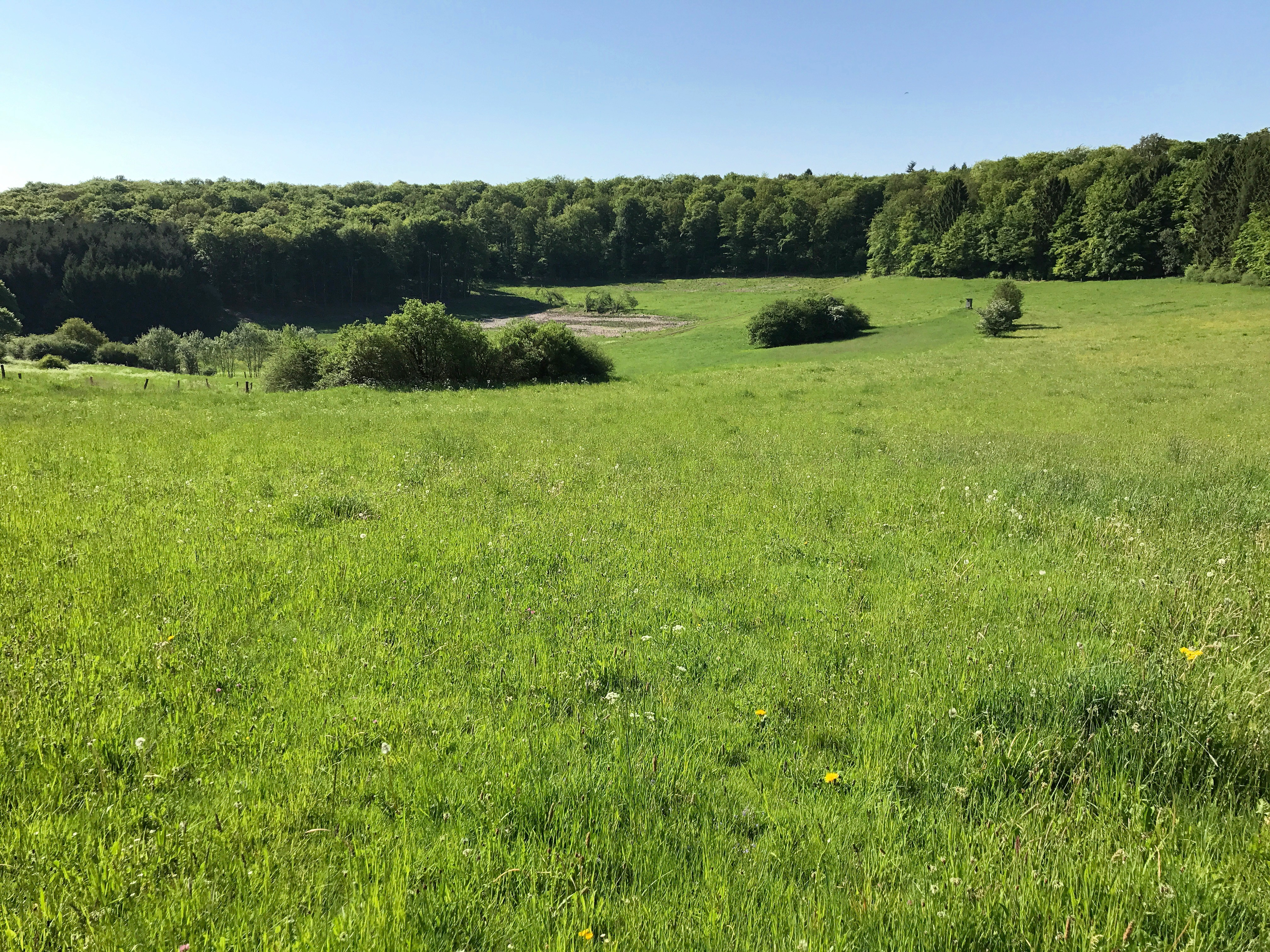
The Trockenmaar on the Hohe List (1 km SW of Schalkenmehren)

In the Eifel and Volcanic Eifel there are numerous dry maars:

- Mosbrucher Weiher (4 km SE of Kelberg)
- Booser Doppelmaar (W of Boos; near Kelberg)
- Dreiser Weiher (W of Dreis-Brück, N of Daun)
- Dürres Maar (SW of Gillenfeld)
- Duppacher Weiher (near Duppach, NW of Gerolstein)
- Geeser Maar (E of Gerolstein, N of Gees)
- Eckfelder Maar (near Eckfeld)
- Eigelbacher Maar (near Kopp, county of Daun; maar basin: c. 1200 m × 1200 m)
- Hitsche Maar (NW of the Dürre Maar, smallest Eifel maar; Ø = 60 m)
- Immerather Risch (Middle Low German: risch = reed bed; N of the Immerather Maar)
- Gerolsteiner Maar (NE of Gerolstein)
- Schalkenmehrener Maar E (of Schalkenmehren)
- Schönfelder Maar (SW of Stadtkyll-Schönfeld)
- Steffelner Laach or "Laach Maar" (near Steffeln)
- Dehner Maar (near Reuth)
- Walsdorfer Maar ("Schilierwiese"; S of Walsdorf; maar basin: c. 1150 m × 1000 m)
- Wollmerather Maar (near Wollmerath)

===== Broader use of the term maar =====
The following volcanic features are often colloquially referred to as a "maar" or "maar lake", although they are not, strictly speaking, maars:

- Windsborn Crater Lake and Hinkelsmaar in the Manderscheid Volcano Group near Bettenfeld, crater lakes of the Mosenberg (Eifel)|Mosenberg
- Laacher See near Maria Laach, lake in a caldera of the Laacher See volcano
- Strohner Märchen (south of the Pulvermaar), volcanic pipe which has become a maar
- Papenkaule, a volcanic crater, and the associated eruption site of the Hagelskaule
- Elfenmaar near Bad Bertrich, an almost entirely eroded stratovolcano
- Rodder Maar near Niederdürenbach, the origin of which is unclear

==== Maars outside the Eifel ====
In Germany there are also several maars outside of the Eifel. A well-known example is the Messel pit, a former maar lake near Messel in the county of Darmstadt-Dieburg and which is known for its well preserved fossils. In addition in the Swabian Jura and the Albvorland (the Swabian Volcano) there are maar-forming volcanoes. Because the over 350 eruption points were only active in the Upper Miocene 17 to 11 million years ago, all the maars, apart from the dry maar, Randecker Maar and the Molach, are only detectable geologically. In the Ore Mountains near Hammerunterwiesenthal, the Hammerunterwiesenthal Maar formed about 30 million years ago during the Oligocene; the maar measures 2 kilometres from east to west and 1.4 kilometres from north to south.

=== Rest of Europe ===
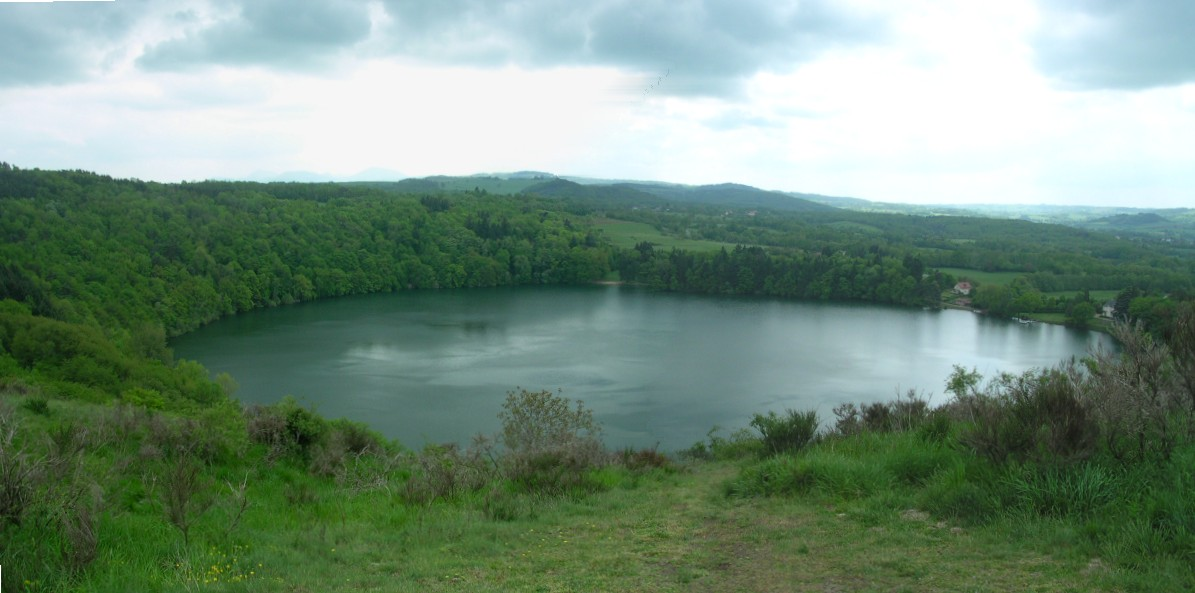
Gour de Tazenat, Chaîne des Puys, France

The Chaîne des Puys in France contains numerous maars; Lake Albano in the Alban Mountains is a complex maar, and there is also a submarine maar (Kolumbo) near Santorini in Greece. The Campo de Calatrava Volcanic Field in Spain contains numerous maars; a typical example being the maar of Hoya del Mortero at Poblete in the Province of Ciudad Real.

Active maars were commonplace in Fife and Lothian, Scotland during the Carboniferous period. The location of one such maar was Elie Ness.

=== Americas ===
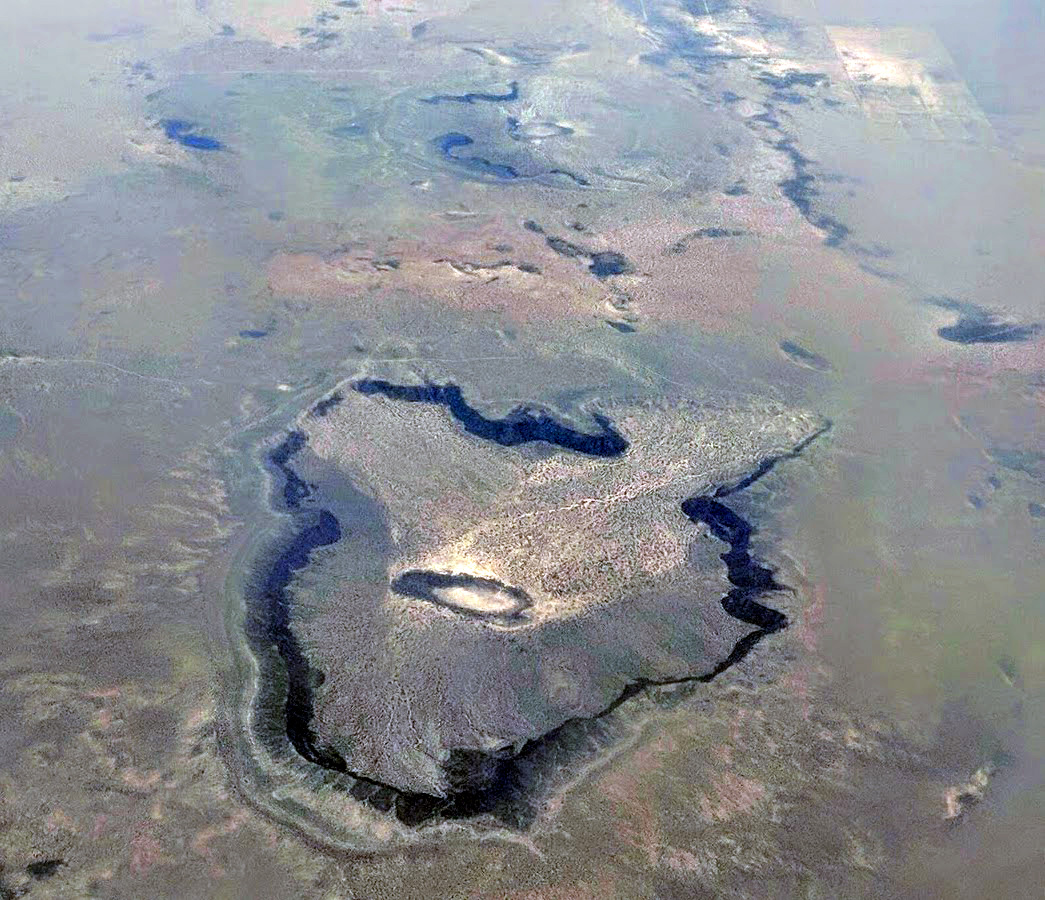
Kilbourne Hole in the Potrillo volcanic field of New Mexico

Active maar volcanoes are mainly known outside Europe.

In the US there are numerous maar areas, such as in Alaska (Ukinrek maars, Nunivak in the Bering Sea); in Washington (Battle Ground Lake); in Oregon (Fort Rock basin with the maars of Big Hole, Hole-in-the-Ground, Table Rock); in Death Valley National Park, California (Ubehebe Crater); in Nevada (Soda Lakes); as well as the maars of the White Rock Canyon, Mount Taylor, the Potrillo volcanic fields (Kilbourne Hole and Hunt's Hole), and Zuñi Salt Lake in New Mexico.

In Central Mexico, the Tarascan volcanic field contains several maars in the states of Michoacán and Guanajuato. The Río Cuarto and Hule maars are in Costa Rica. In Nicaragua is the maar of Laguna de Xiloa, part of the Apoyeque volcano. From South America, there are known maars in Chile (e.g. Cerro Overo and Cerro Tujle in northern Chile). Jayu Khota is a maar in Bolivia.

=== Middle East and Africa ===
The maar of Lake Ram lies on the Golan Heights; further south maars occur in Africa (Bilate Volcanic Field and Haro Maja in the Butajiri-Silti-Volcanic Field, Ethiopia, the Bayuda Volcanic Field in the Sudan and Lake Nyos in the Oku Volcanic Field in Cameroon). In Saudi Arabia the Al Wahbah crater formed as a result of a maar eruption.

=== Asia and Oceania ===
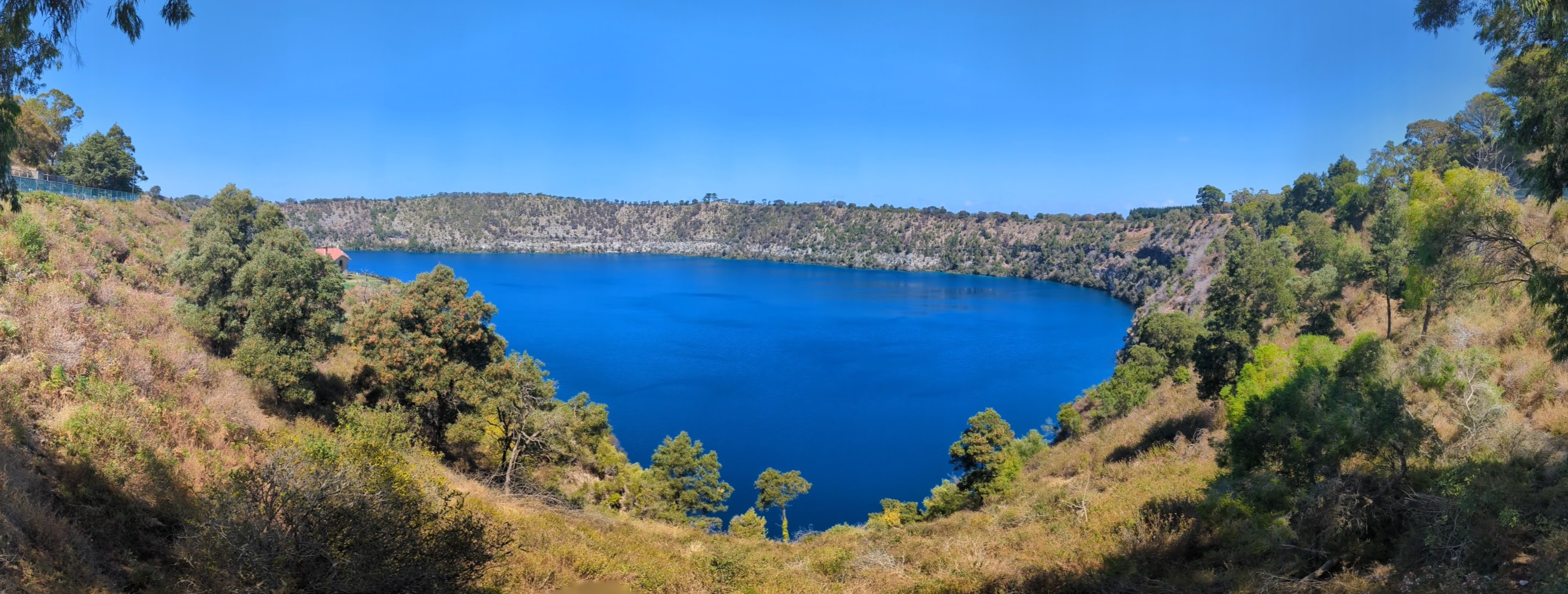
Blue Lake / Warwar, a maar at Mount Gambier, South Australia

In Japan there are maars in the Kirishima-Yaku volcanic field in the Kirishima-Yaku National Park on Kyushu. These include the several maars of the Ibusuki volcanic field such as Lake Unagi. On Honshu in Myōkō-Togakushi Renzan National Park there is Kagamiike Pond as well as many on the volcanic island of Miyake-jima, Izu Islands (Furumio, Mi'ike, Mizutamari, Shinmio).

Koranga Maar and Numundo Maar are in Papua New Guinea. Kawah Masemo maar is on Mount Sempu volcano in Indonesia. The San Pablo Volcanic Field in the Province of Laguna on the island of Luzon in the Philippines contains maars.

The Newer Volcanics Province in the States of South Australia and Victoria, Australia, has numerous maars, such as Mount Gambier, Mount Schank and Tower Hill, whose complex system of nested maars is enclosed by one of the largest maars in the world.

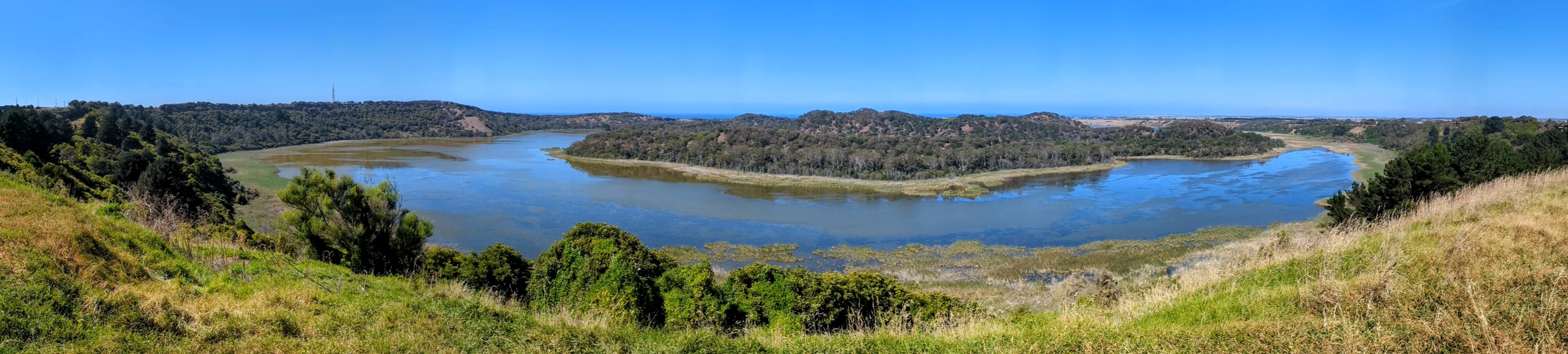
Tower Hill Lake at Tower Hill Wildlife Preserve, one of the world's largest maars

Foulden Maar in Otago, New Zealand, is an important fossil site, but there are many more maars in New Zealand. As already mentioned these include Lake Pupuke, but the Auckland volcanic field has other easily accessible maars such as the Mangere Lagoon, Orakei Basin, Panmure Basin, and Pukaki Lagoon. Elsewhere a recent example, only 4000 years old, is Lake Rotokawau in the Bay of Plenty Region.

== Gallery ==
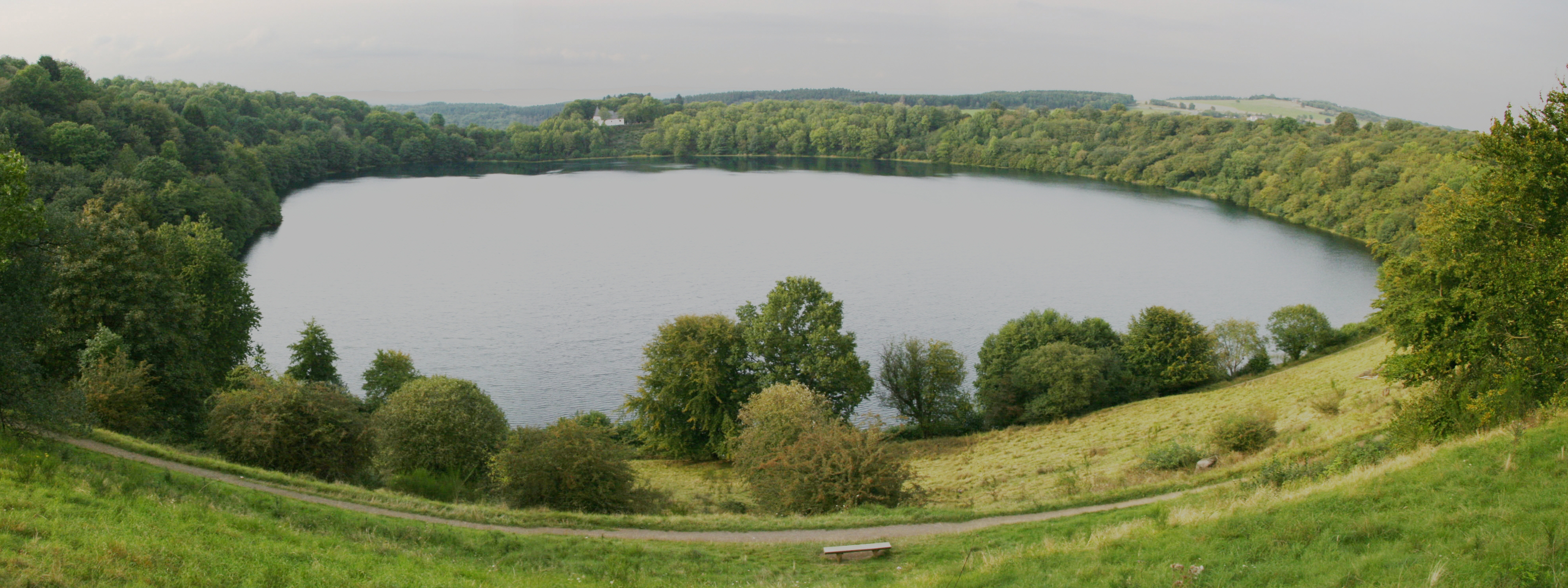
Weinfelder Maar, one of the three maars originally described

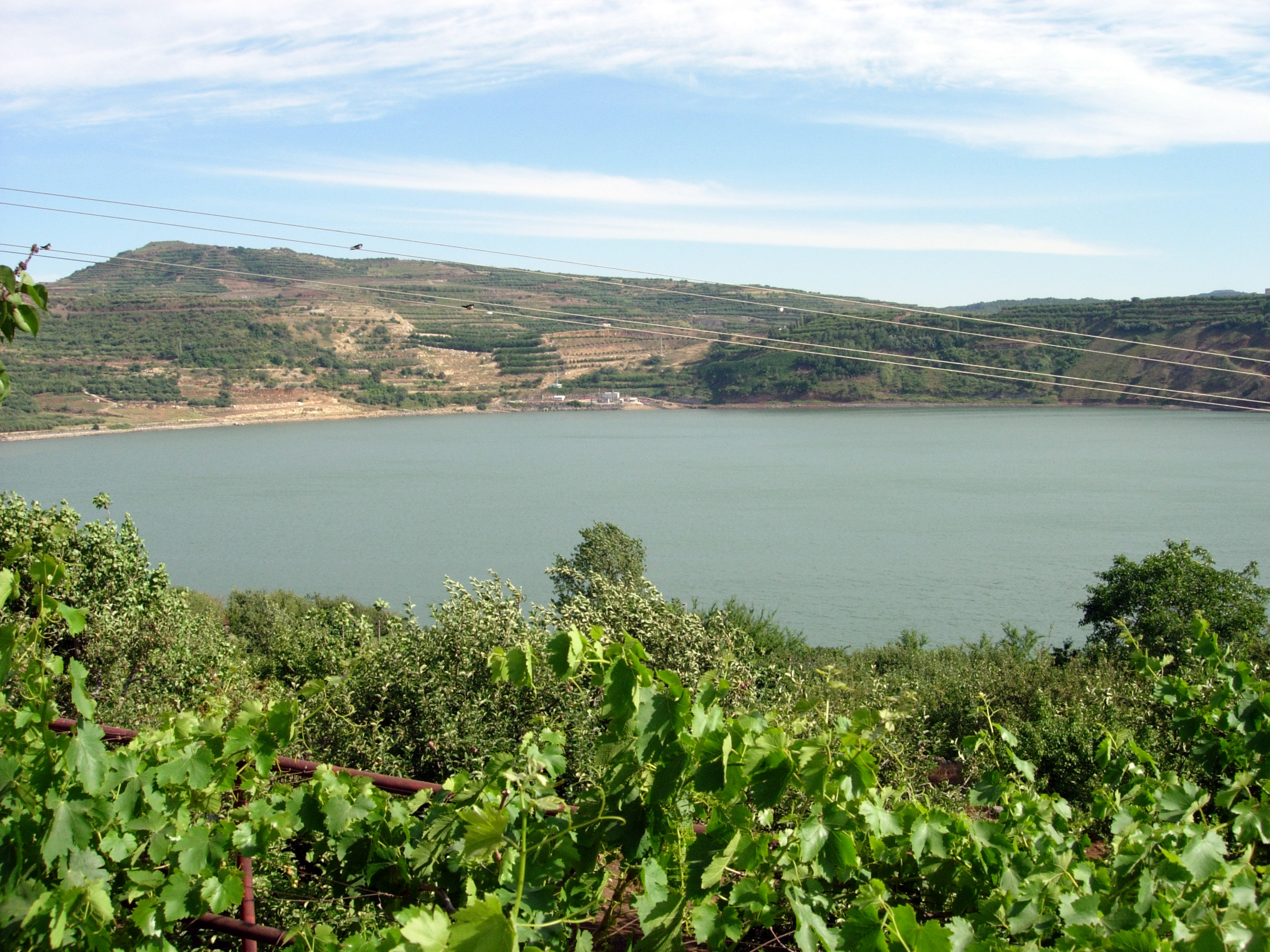
The maar at Birkat Ram, the Golan Heights

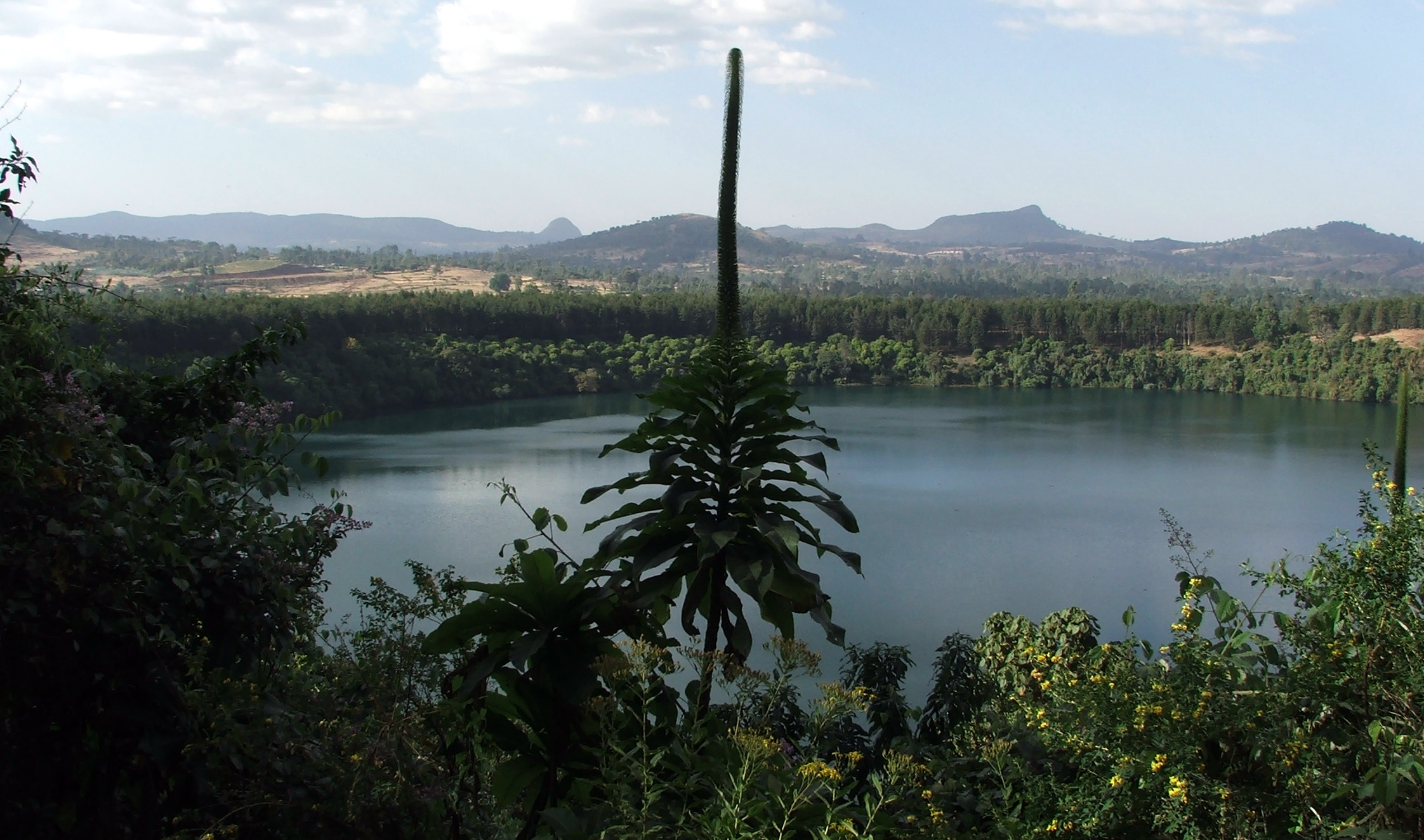
Zengena Lake, a maar in Amhara Region, Ethiopia

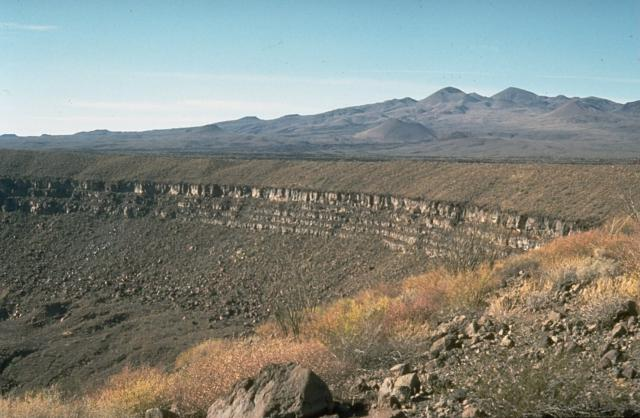
El Elegante Crater, in Sonoran Desert, Mexico

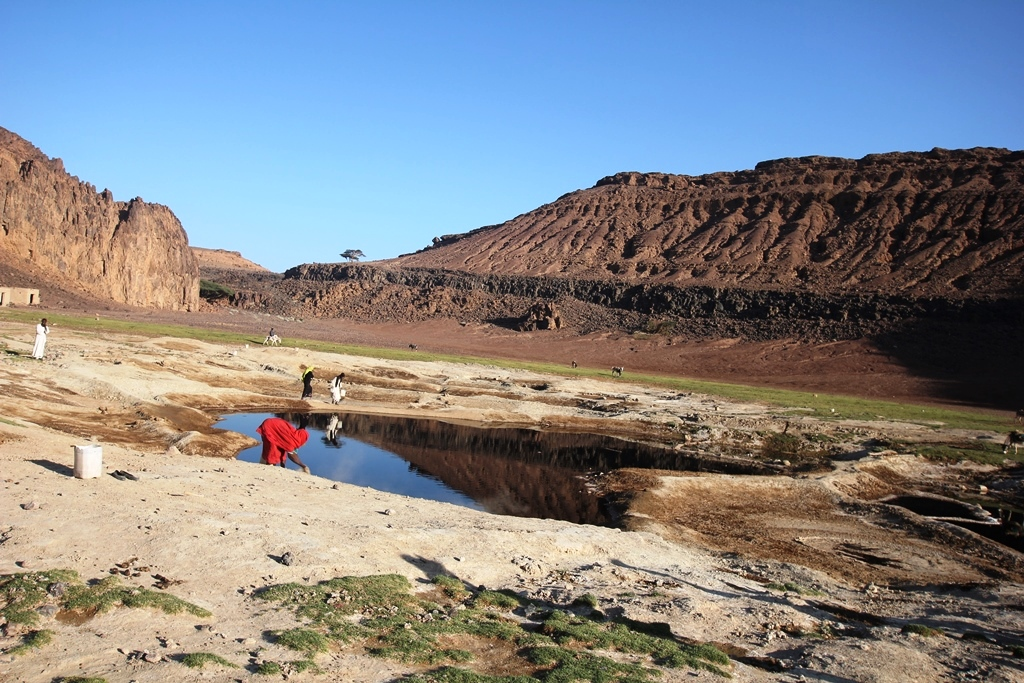
El Muweilih Crater, a maar in Bayuda volcanic field, Sudan: Natron-rich clay on the crater floor

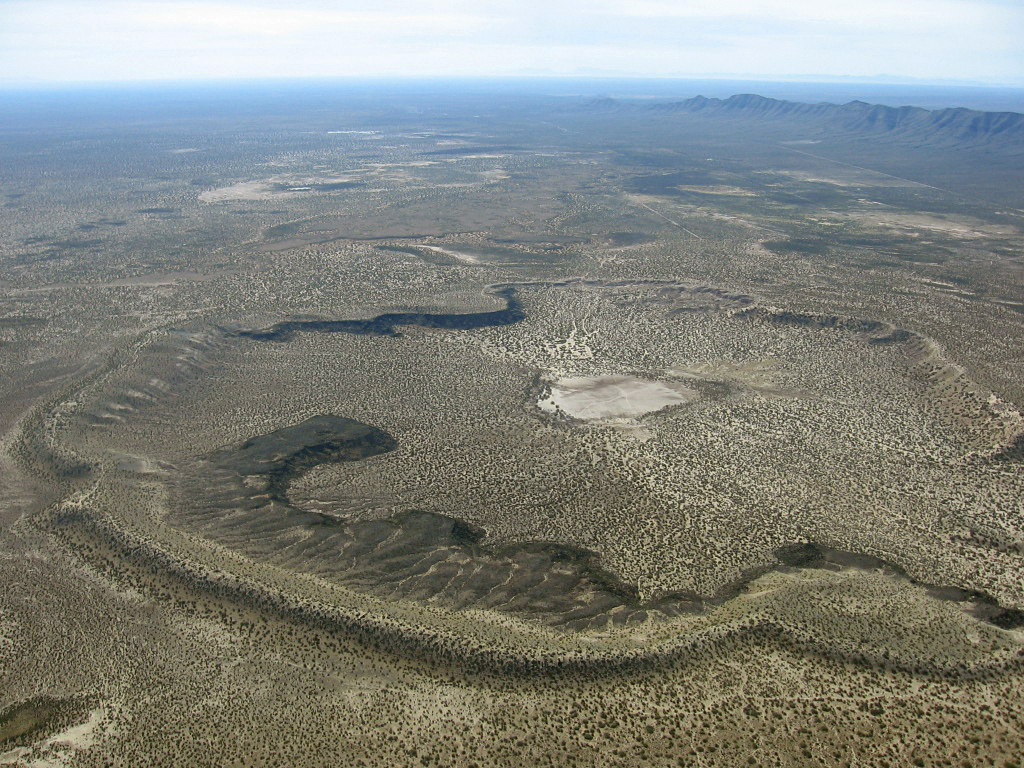
Hunt's Hole in the Potrillo volcanic field of New Mexico

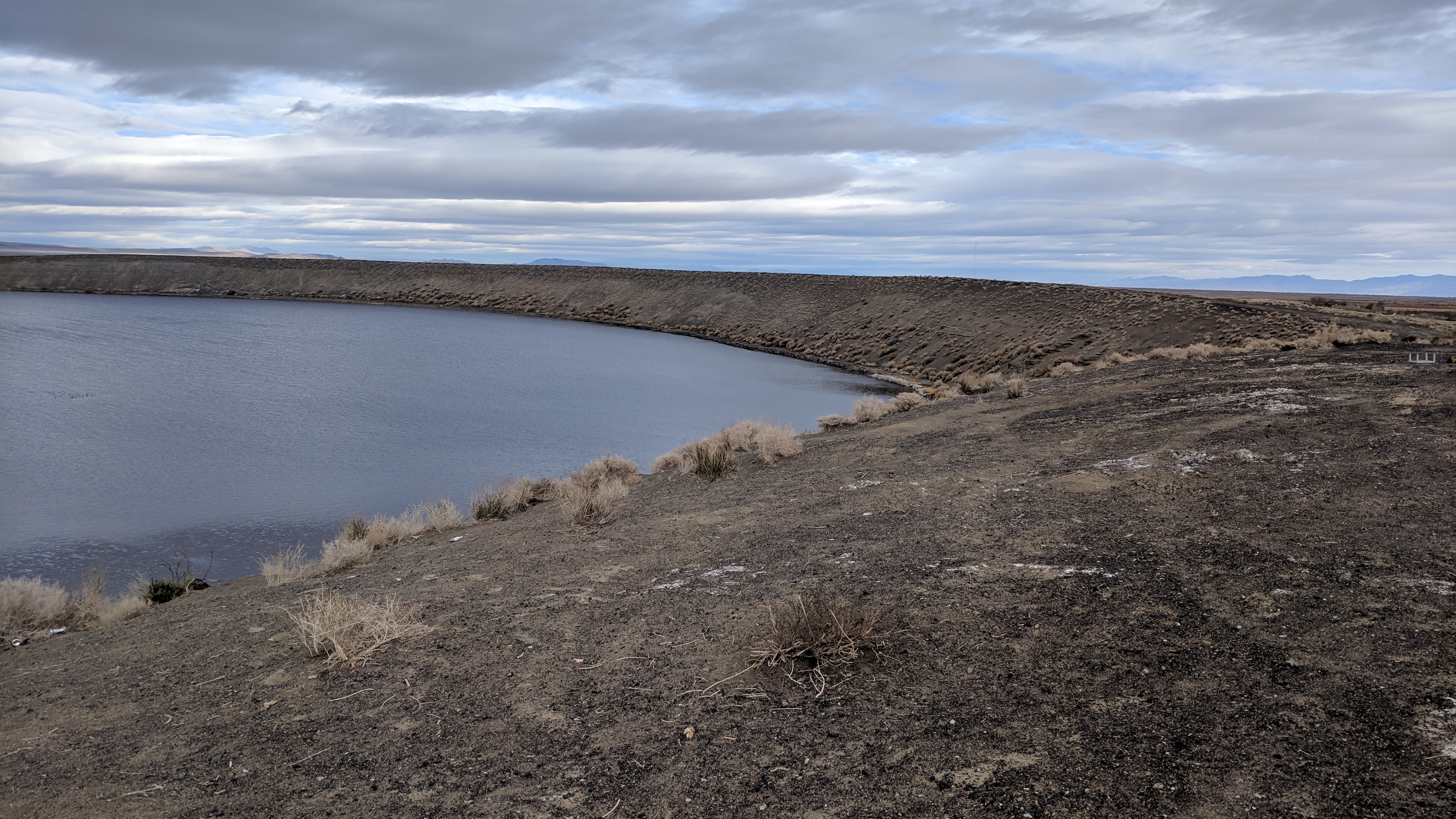
Big Soda Lake in Nevada

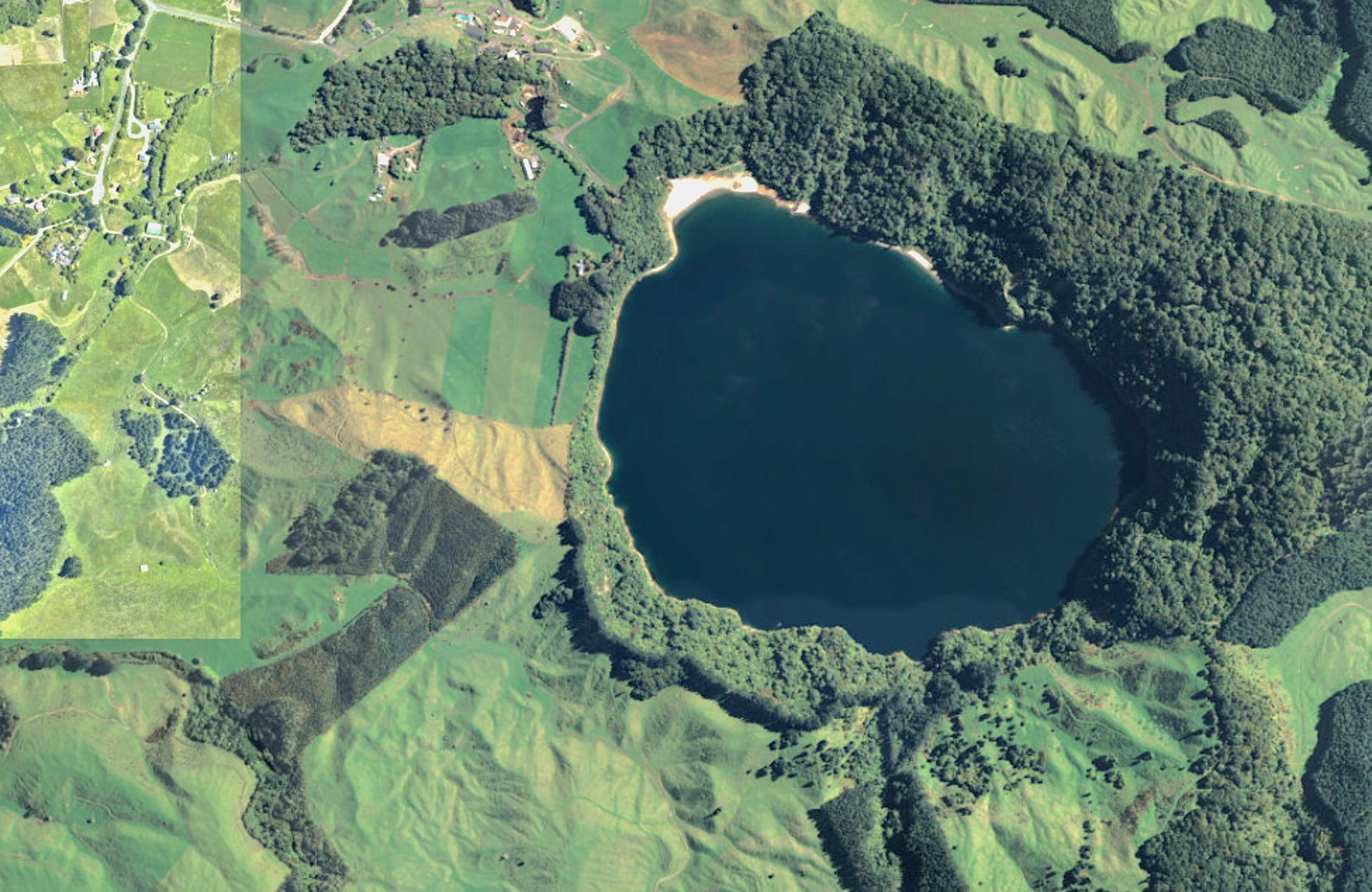
Lake Rotokawau in New Zealand

== See also ==
- Tuff ring – Volcanic eruption involving both steam and magma
- Tuff cone – Landform of ejecta from a volcanic vent piled up in a conical shape
- Caldera – Cauldron-like volcanic feature formed by the emptying of a magma chamber

== Literature ==
- USGS photo glossary: Maar
- USGS: Maars and tuff cones
