= Immerath =

Immerath may refer to the following places in Germany:

- Immerath, Rhineland-Palatinate, a municipality in Rhineland-Palatinate
- Immerath (Erkelenz), a village in the municipality Erkelenz, North Rhine-Westphalia
