= Volcano museum =

Volcano museum may refer to the following museums in the Eifel mountains:

- Volcano Museum, Daun
- Volcano House, Strohn
- German Volcano Museum, Mendig
