= Immerather Maar =

Lake in Germany

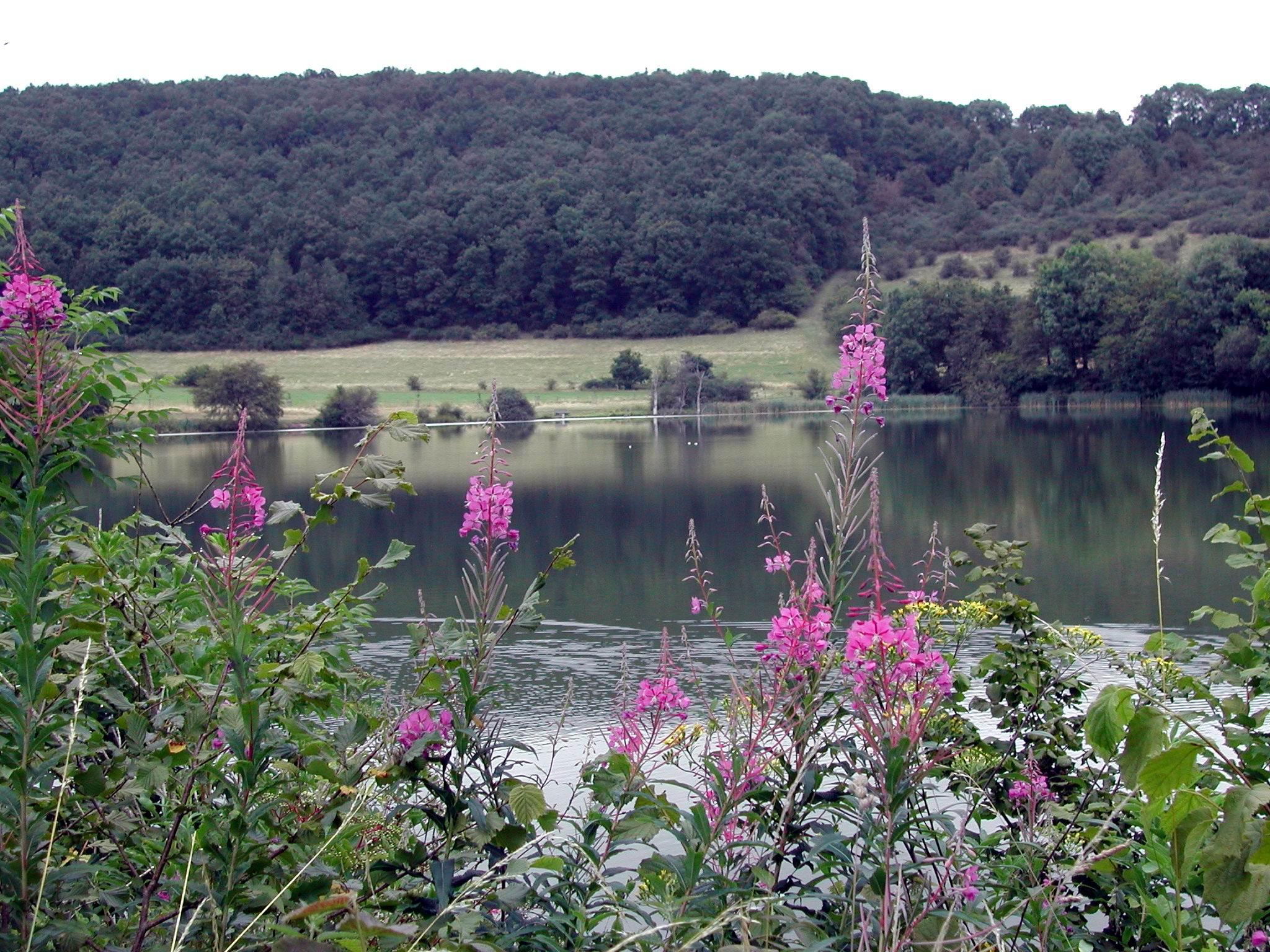

- Location within Germany
- Location: Vulkaneifel, Rhineland-Palatinate, Germany
- Coordinates: 50°07′18.6″N 06°57′31.2″E
- Catchment area: 640,000 m^{2} (6,900,000 sq ft)
- Surface area: 60,000 m^{2} (650,000 sq ft)
- Average depth: 1.50 m (4 ft 11 in)
- Max. depth: 2.9 m (9 ft 6 in)
- Water volume: 90,000 m^{3} (3,200,000 cu ft)
- Residence time: 0.3 years
- Shore length^{1}: 800 m (2,600 ft)
- ^{1} Shore length is not a well-defined measure.

The Immerather Maar is a maar in the municipality of Immerath in the county of Vulkaneifel in the German state of Rhineland-Palatinate. It is part of a designated nature reserve and Special Area of Conservation.

== Formation ==
The maar was formed by volcanic activity about 40,000 to 70,000 years ago. Around 1750 the maar was drained by a maar stream and dried out so that most of it could be used as pastureland. The area of the maar was even divided into plots. Between 1914 and 1918 the stream became wild. This led to it being blocked and the formation of a shallow maar. The height of the water surface has changed little since then.

== Description ==
The Immerather Maar is the smallest and shallowest of the Eifel maar lakes. It is located at a height of 368.1 metres above sea level (NN). Its surface area is about 60,000 square metres (650,000 sq ft) and its volume is about 90,000 cubic metres (3,200,000 cu ft). It has a depth of up to 2.9 metres (9 ft 6 in), the average depth being approximately 1.50 metres (4 ft 11 in). The lakebed is flat and level, and there are only obstacles, in the form of fallen trees and tree stumps, in the water near the shores. The ground drops evenly from the shore towards the middle of the maar, except in the area of the outlet where there is a step; the water depth rising from 0.6 metres to 2.8 metres over a distance of 5 metres. The turbidity of the water has reduced in recent years, due to increasing plant growth, and now varies between 0.25 and 2.0 metres depending on the season. The water has a renewal time of 0.3 years. The maar does not have an above-ground inflow, but is fed exclusively by surface and ground water in the crater. It has a catchment of 640,000 square metres (6,900,000 sq ft). The shoreline is 800 metres (2,600 ft) long.

The Immerather Maar is mainly a recreational area. Because of its large fish population, the waters are used by anglers.

Two large fish die-offs in the last few years have almost wiped out the stock of bream. The remaining fish species are rudd, perch, pike, tench, carp and eel.

== Nature reserve ==
The Immerather Maar and its shore area were designated as a nature reserve by the Regierungsbezirk of Trier on 12 June 1979. The purpose of the protection is to preserve the typical character of the maar in its entirety, including the natural vegetation along the banks of the river and to preserve its fauna and flora. The protected area covers an area of 61.29 hectares.

== Literature ==
- Werner D´hein: Natur- und Kulturführer Vulkanlandeifel. Mit 26 Stationen der „Deutschen Vulkanstraße“. Gaasterland-Verlag, Düsseldorf 2006, ISBN 3-935873-15-8
