= Volcano Museum, Daun =

Coordinates: 50°11′53.7″N 6°49′46.85″E

- Eifel-Vulkanmuseum
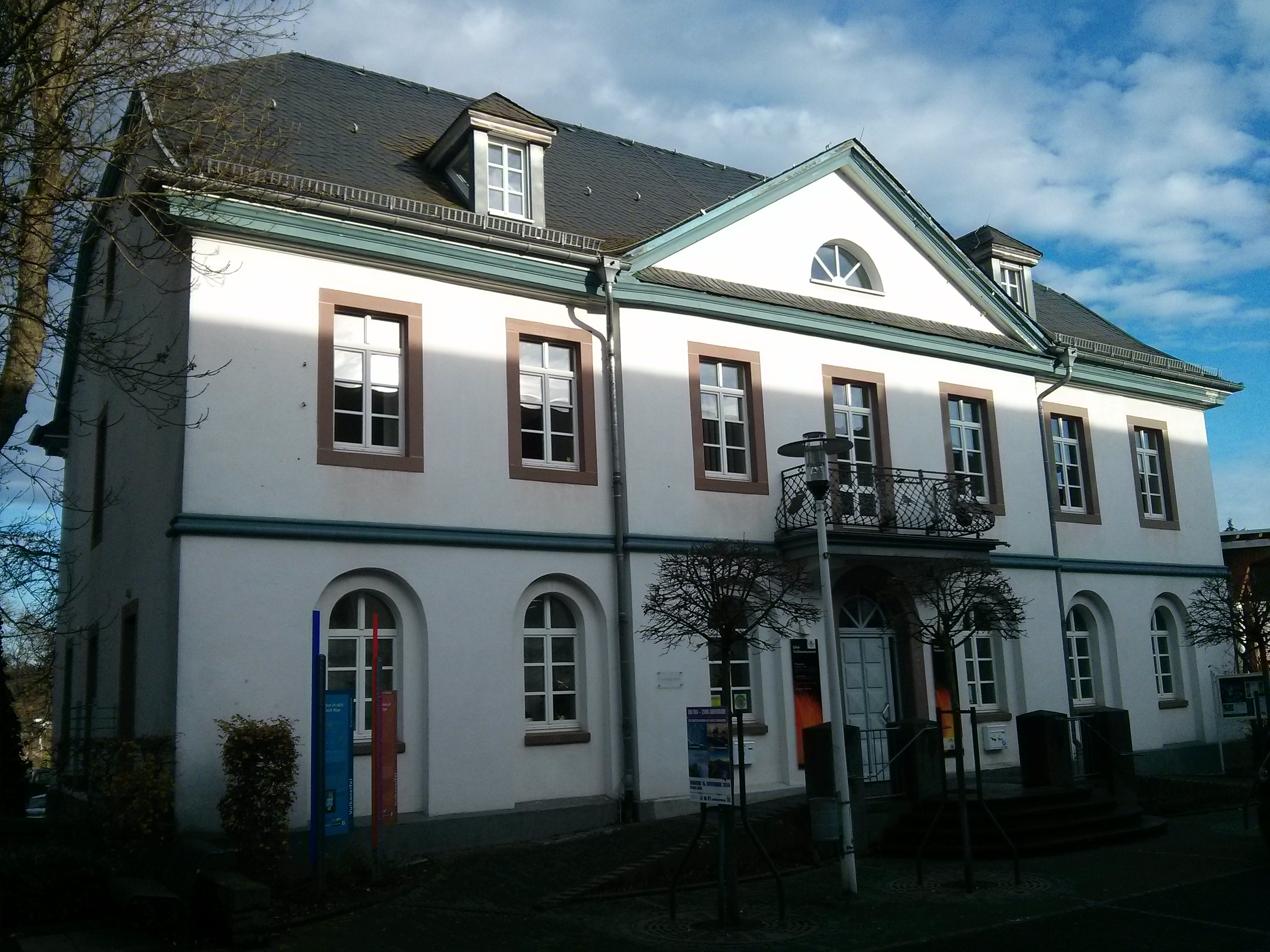
- The Eifel Volcano Museum
- Location: Daun, Rhineland-Palatinate, Germany
- Type: Volcano museum
- Owner: Landkreis Vulkaneifel
- Website: Eifel-Vulkanmuseum Daun

The Volcano Museum (German: Vulkanmuseum) in the old district administrative office (Landratsamt) in Daun, Germany, was set up as an extension of the existing 'geopaths' at Hillesheim, Manderscheid and Gerolstein and is part of the Volcanic Eifel Nature and Geopark.

Numerous information boards, photographs and exhibits from the Volcanic Eifel, as well as of currently active volcanoes in Europe and Asia, offer insights into the geological development of the Volcanic Eifel region.

In addition, there are several other volcano museums that cover the Eifel, such as the Maar Museum in Manderscheid and the Volcano House, Strohn.

== Exhibits ==
In the exhibition rooms are interactive computer models about the geology and volcanism of the Eifel. On a large overview map at the entrance, the phenomena of continental movement (plate tectonics) is explained, and currently active volcanoes can be viewed by means of fluorescent lights. A computer simulation shows the distribution of the continents in the geological eras of the past and also in the future. Other exhibits explain the origin and evolution of the rocks. In the exhibition room "Eifel Volcanism" the visitor can even simulate a volcanic eruption using a model of a cinder cone.

Other models show the entire region of the volcanic West Eifel and the formation of volcano types in Eifel region. The models are supplemented in turn by numerous exhibits from the Volcanic Eifel. In the Volcanic Eifel Geo Centre, all the geologically related facilities of the Volcanic Eifel are summarized on an information board. These include the Devonian Route, the Bunter Sandstone Route, the Volcano Route, the Mineral Spring Route as well as mining and other museum facilities. Once again, visitors can illuminate geologically interesting places on a clear wall map using buttons. In the basement of the museum, the training centre of the Geo Centre offers a wide range of media and exhibits relating to geology.

== Literature ==
- Werner P. D´hein: Vulkanland Eifel. Natur- und Kulturführer, mit 26 Stationen der "Deutschen Vulkanstraße". Gaasterland-Verlag, Düsseldorf, 2006, ISBN 3-935873-15-8, ISBN 978-3-935873-15-4
