= Maar Museum =

Museum in Manderscheid, Germany

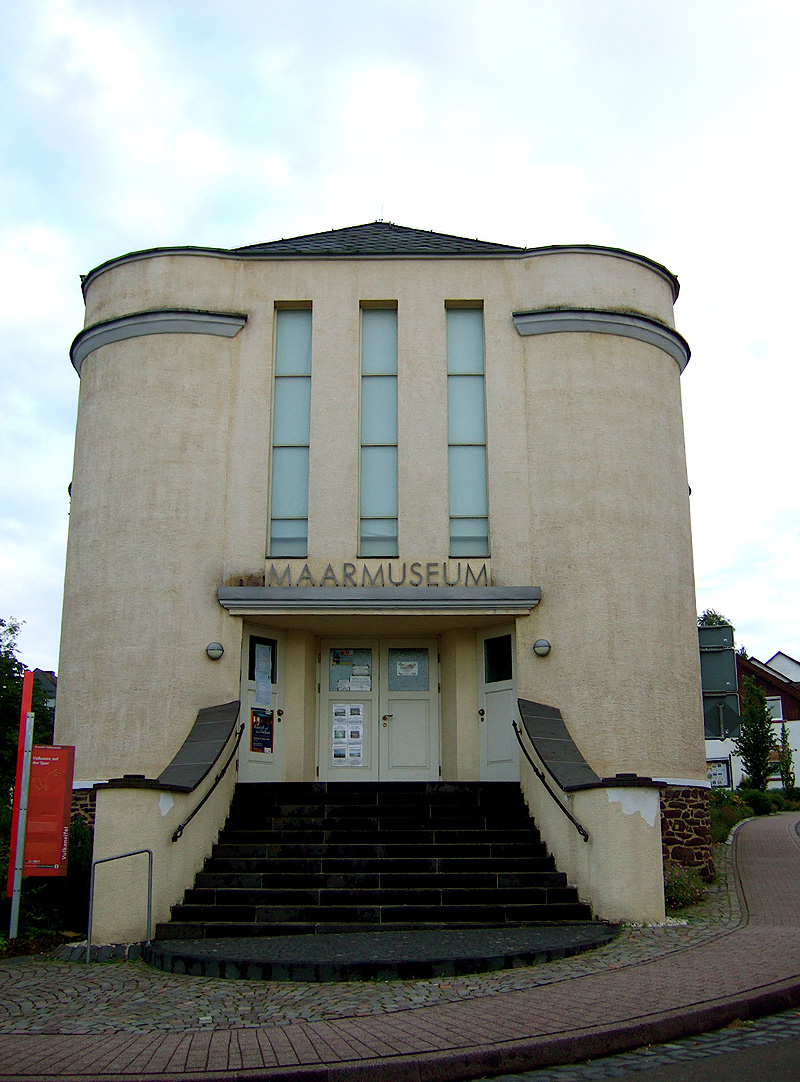
The Maar Museum

The Maar Museum (German: Maarmuseum) in Manderscheid in the German state of Rhineland-Palatinate is a museum whose focus is natural variety and international significance for science and the region of the volcanic maars that characterise parts of the Eifel mountains.

== Exhibition ==
The central theme of the exhibition is "the formation, history and development of the Eifel maars past and present". As a result, the maars are not just presented in isolation, but in the wider, international context. The reason for that is the specialist knowledge of many international scientists who take part in the development of the museum.

== Building ==
The building of the present museum was built in 1930 in the Expressionist-influenced style of the Neues Bauen as a gymnastics and festival hall. It is a listed building.
