= Weinfelder Maar =

Maar in Germany

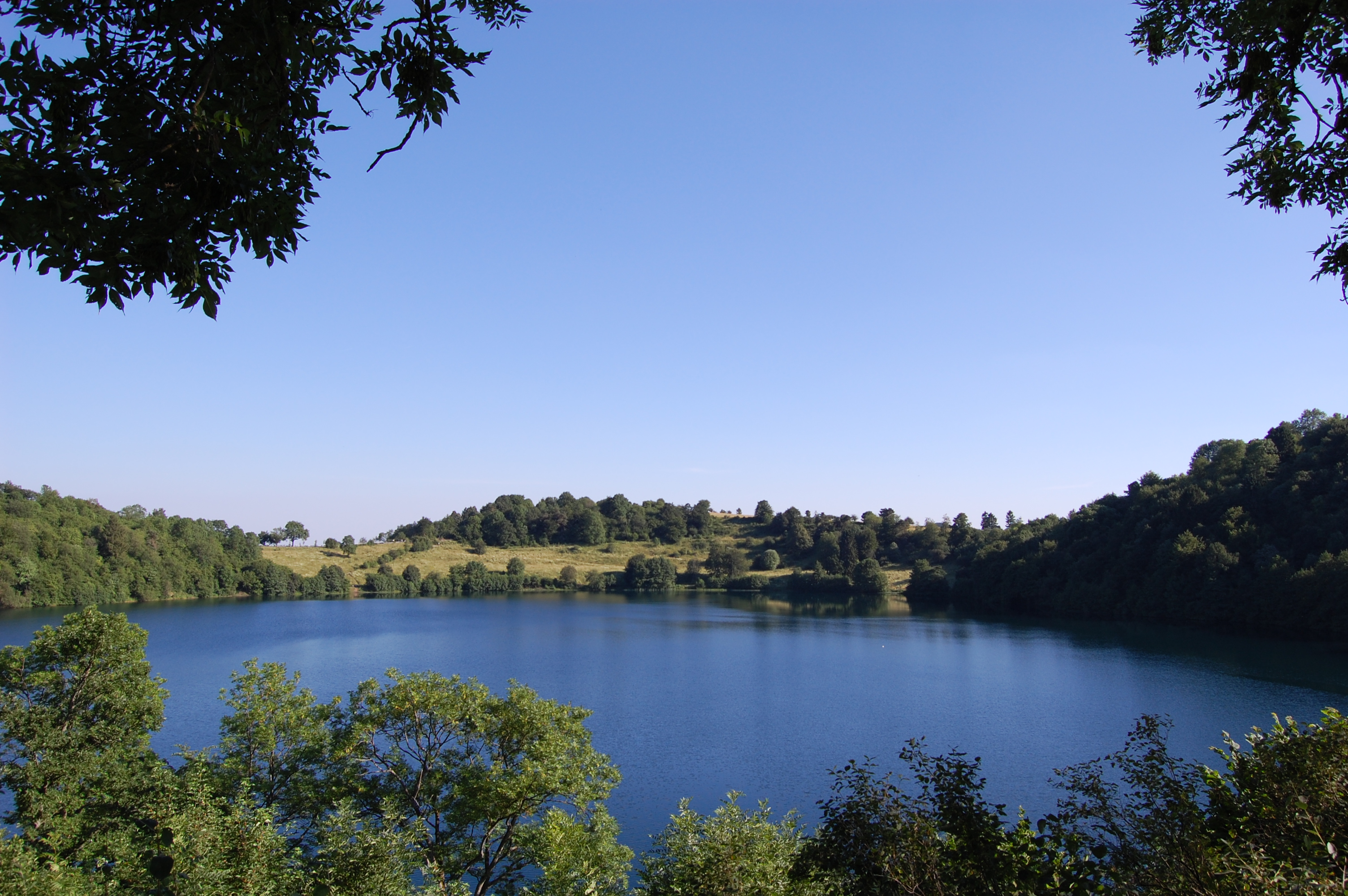

- Location within Rhineland-Palatinate Location within Germany Location within Europe
- Location: Daun, Eifel
- Coordinates: 50°10′35″N 6°51′1″E
- Basin countries: Germany
- Max. length: 525 m (1,722 ft)
- Max. width: 375 m (1,230 ft)
- Surface area: 16.8 ha (42 acres)
- Max. depth: 51 m (167 ft)
- Surface elevation: 483.5 m (1,586 ft)

The Weinfelder Maar, also called the Totenmaar, is a maar around two kilometres southeast of the town of Daun in the Eifel Mountains, in the German state of Rhineland-Palatinate.

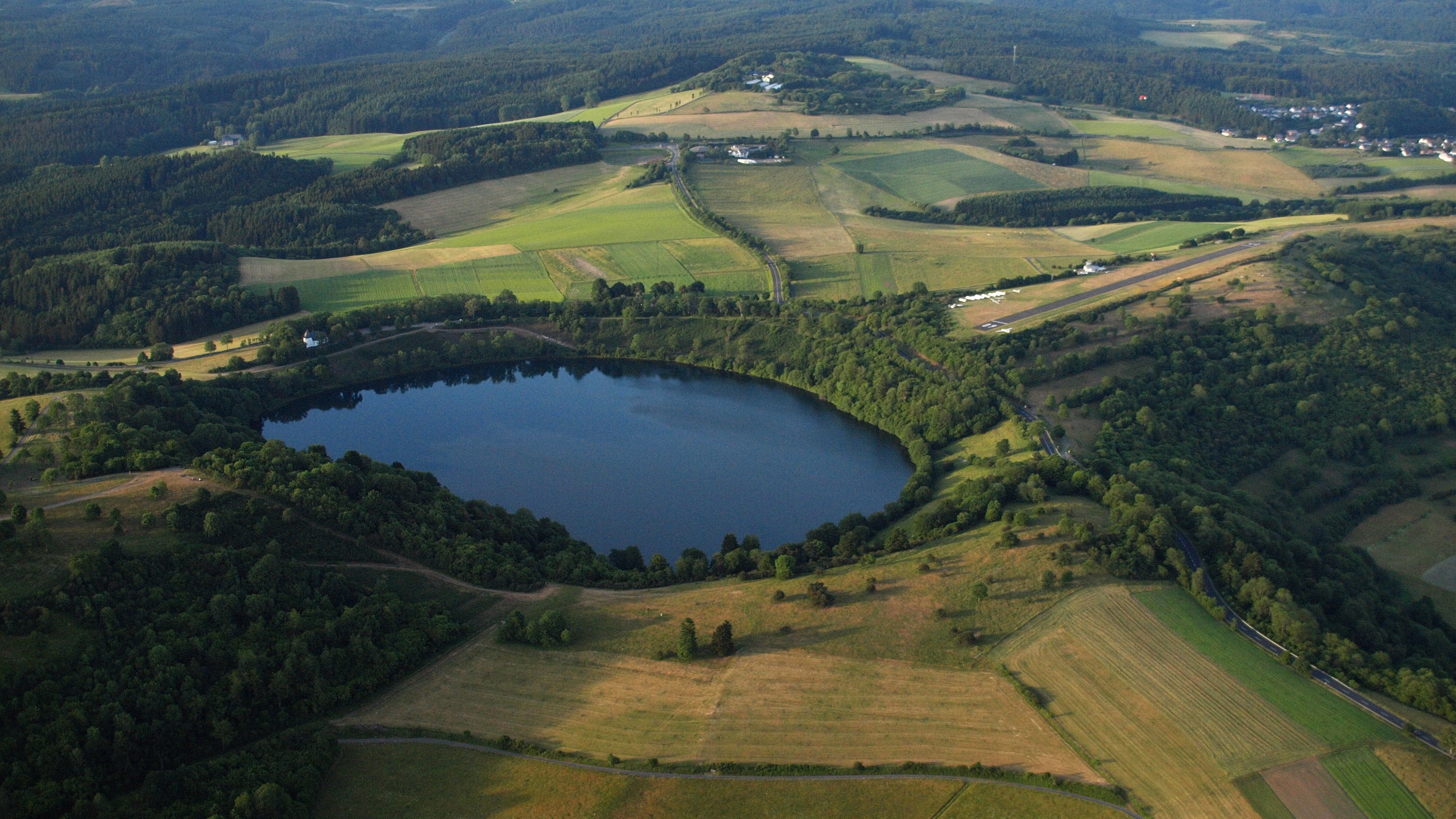
Weinfelder Maar (2015 aerial photo)

== Geography ==
The maar lake was formed about 10,500 years ago by a volcanic steam explosion and is around 525 metres long, 375 metres wide and 51 metres deep. It has a surface area of about 16.8 hectares. The maar lies at a height of 483.5 m above sea level (NHN). The embankment surrounding the lake is made from tuff and is higher in the west and south than in the north and east. Along the course of this bank is the Mäuseberg (561.2 m) and the Maarkreuz (534.5 m). The lake region is now a nature reserve and bathing in the lake is forbidden.

== Name ==
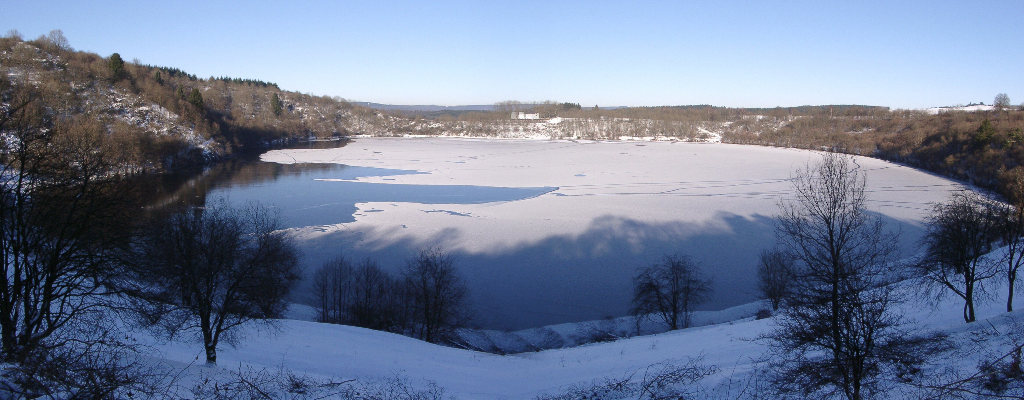
The Weinfelder Maar in winter with a view of the church in Weinfeld

The description "Totenmaar" ("maar of the dead") comes from the cemetery in the immediate vicinity of the maar with its little chapel, parts of which date to the 14th century. This was the old parish church of Weinfeld. The village was abandoned in the 16th century (it was last mentioned in 1512) in the wake of the Plague.

The chapel and attached cemetery are used today for burials by the municipality of Schalkenmehren. In the entrance way of the chapel are numerous Dank-Tafeln, plaques with inscriptions such as "[Saint] Mary has helped".

== Legends ==
There are several legends associated with the tranquil Totenmaar. According to one, a castle once stood on this spot in which a benevolent count lived with his servants, his hard-hearted wife and his only child. One day, the count returned home from the hunt and found only a lake in the place where his castle had stood. It was buried in the ground with all its inhabitants and had left behind a lake, the Totenmaar. Miraculously a cradle appeared on the surface, in which his child drifted safely to shore. The count's horse scraped a spring from the ground at the behest of his master. Later, out of gratitude for the salvation of his child, the count built a chapel, which is still preserved along with the spring.

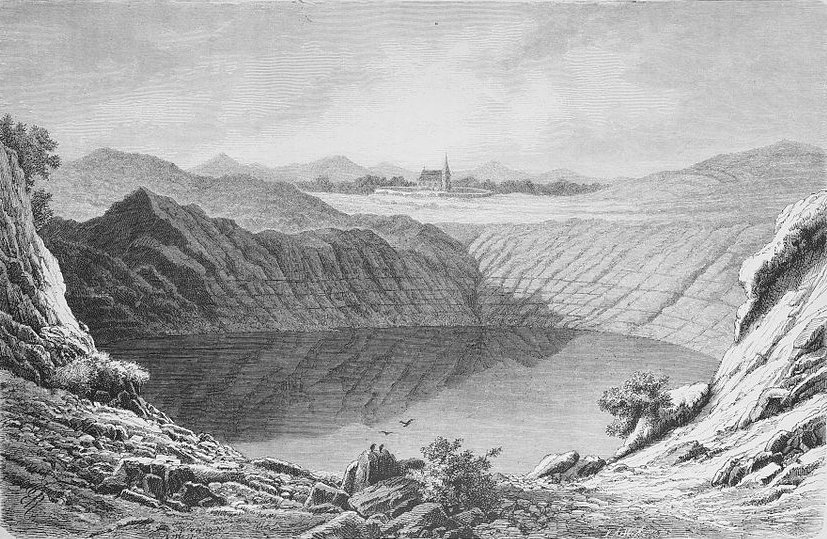
The Weinfelder Maar in 1878 (Die Gartenlaube)

== See also ==
- List of lakes of Germany

== Literature ==
- Werner P. d´Hein: Nationaler Geopark Vulkanland Eifel. Ein Natur- und Kulturführer. Gaasterland-Verlag, Düsseldorf, 2006, ISBN 3-935873-15-8
