= Immerath, Rhineland-Palatinate =

Immerath
- Municipality
- Coat of arms

- Location of Immerath within Vulkaneifel district
- Interactive map of Immerath
- Location within Germany Location within Rhineland-Palatinate
- Coordinates: 50°07′49″N 6°57′34″E
- Country: Germany
- State: Rhineland-Palatinate
- District: Vulkaneifel
- Municipal assoc.: Daun

Government
  - Mayor (2019–24): Marion Divossen

Area
  - Total: 5.95 km^{2} (2.30 sq mi)
- Elevation: 400 m (1,300 ft)

Population (2025-12-31)
  - Total: 234
  - Density: 39.3/km^{2} (102/sq mi)
- Time zone: UTC+01:00 (CET)
  - Summer (DST): UTC+02:00 (CEST)
- Postal codes: 54552
- Dialling codes: 06573
- Vehicle registration: DAU
- Website: www.immerath-vulkaneifel.de

Immerath is an Ortsgemeinde – a municipality belonging to a Verbandsgemeinde, a kind of collective municipality – in the Vulkaneifel district in Rhineland-Palatinate, Germany. It belongs to the Verbandsgemeinde of Daun, whose seat is in the like-named town.

== Geography ==
=== Location ===
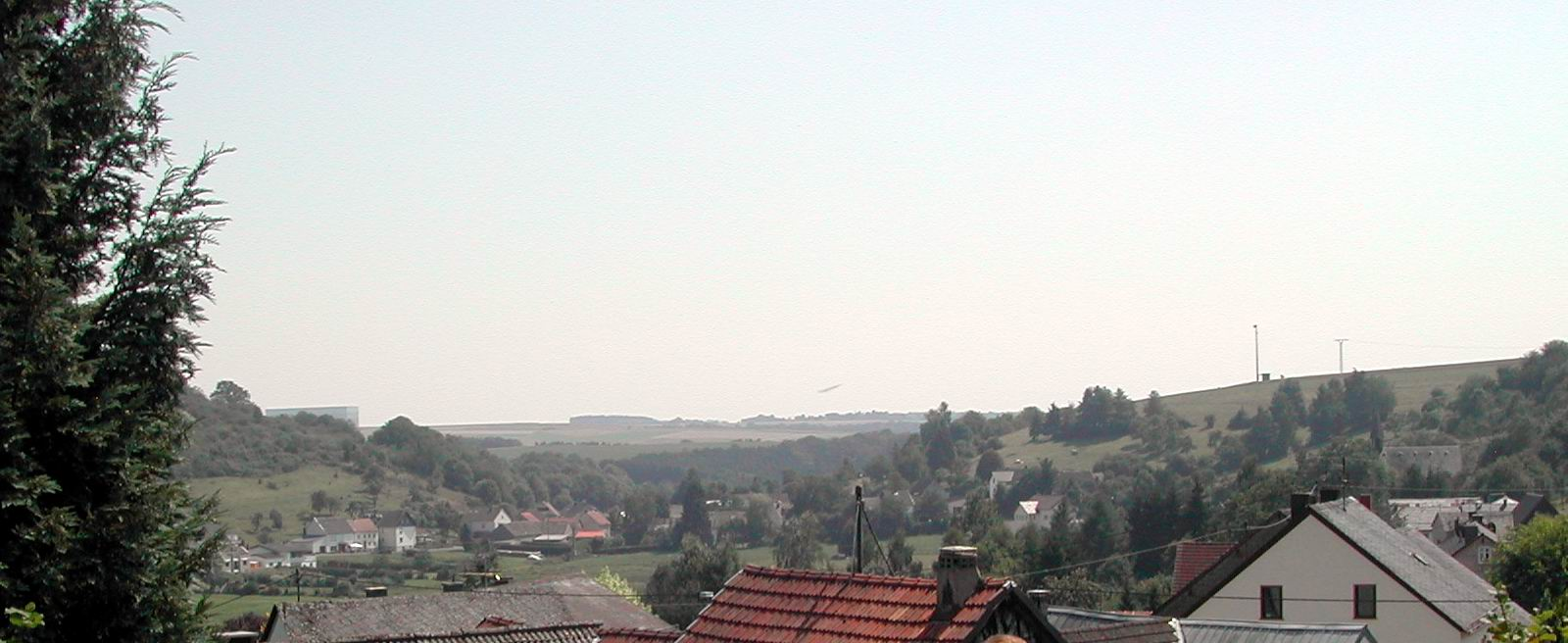
Immerath

The municipality lies in the Vulkaneifel, a part of the Eifel known for its volcanic history, geographical and geological features, and even ongoing activity today, including gases that sometimes well up from the earth.

Immerath lies 20 km southeast of the district seat of Daun and some 22 km west of Cochem on the Moselle. On Immerath's outskirts runs Bundesstraße 421, and in Mehren near Daun is an interchange on the Autobahn A 1 (Koblenz – Trier).

Near Immerath lies the Immerather Maar, a lake that has formed in a volcanic crater; only 2 km to the east is another, the Pulvermaar. One kilometre to the east is the Üßbach valley.

=== Neighbouring municipalities ===
Immerath's neighbours are Gillenfeld, Strotzbüsch and Lutzerath.

== History ==
Digs and finds in the 1930s on the eastern slope of the hollow in which Immerath lies – actually a volcanic crater – led to the conclusion that sometime about the 3rd century, a stately villa arose here. A wealthy Roman, it is believed, had a whole complex of buildings built here with a main house, stabling and servants’ lodging. The main house alone measured some thirty metres along the front and had 15 rooms.

In 1143, Immerath had its first documentary mention as Emgramenrode in letters patent from King Konrad II for the Springiersbach Monastery. A donation document from Count Palatine Wilhelm in 1144 verifies that Emgramenrode had been transferred to the Springiersbach Monastery's ownership in 1136.

The name's form has changed several time over the ages, appearing in an ecclesiastical protocol at a chapel in 1475 as Ymgerait, and somewhat less than a century later (1569) in a visitation protocol as Imeraidt, which comes close to the name's modern form, which itself first appeared about 1650.

According to Adam Wrede in his book “Eifeler Volkskunde”, places with names ending in —rat indicate that the place was founded by clearing the forest.

=== Population development ===
In 1557, Immerath counted seventeen inhabitants; by 1563, this had grown to eighteen (with three at the Heckenhof – “Hedge Farm” or “Hedge Estate”), and then to 20 by 1587. In 1624, this had become 17 hearths (or houses). Assuming an average occupancy of five people to each house, this yields a population estimate of 85. Indeed, between 1557 and 1625, the number of inhabitants swung between 85 and 105. In 1625, 15 of the village's 17 families earned their livelihood through farming, one was a herdsman's family, and the last was a single person without any identifiable occupation. A year earlier, the village boasted 26 horses, 99 sheep and 4 beehives. On the 1733 taxation rolls, 18 longtime residents, 4 widows, 9 persons without full municipal rights, 31 households and 58 persons subject to taxation were counted. In 1816 the population was 187 and in 1850 there were 36 houses and 203 inhabitants in Immerath. At the Heckenhof lived two families with ten family members, and at the Immerath mill, the miller likewise had ten mouths to feed. In 1970, the village had 297 inhabitants, and in 1985 it had 265. At 30 May 2000, the number was 274.

== Politics ==
=== Municipal council ===
The council is made up of 6 council members, who were elected at the municipal election held on 7 June 2009, and the honorary mayor as chairman.

=== Mayor ===
Immerath's mayor is Marion Divossen.

=== Coat of arms ===
The German blazon reads: Eine eingebogene grüne Spitze, dann eine silberne Kapelle mit schwarzem Dach. Vorne ein durchgehendes rotes Kreuz. Hinten eine blaue Urne.

The municipality's arms might in English heraldic language be described thus: Tierced in mantle dexter argent a cross gules, sinister argent an urn azure and in base vert a chapel of the first with roof and windows sable, the tower to sinister.

The red cross refers to the village's former allegiance to the Electorate of Trier and its former status as part of the Electoral-Trier Amt of Daun. The urn refers to the remnants of a Roman villa found nearby, while the urn's tincture, azure (blue), refers to the nearby water – the Immerather Maar. The green point formed by the mantlelike division of the field symbolizes the village's scenically charming surroundings. The charge in base is Immerath's landmark, the Dreifaltigkeitskapelle (“Trinity Chapel”).

== Culture and sightseeing ==
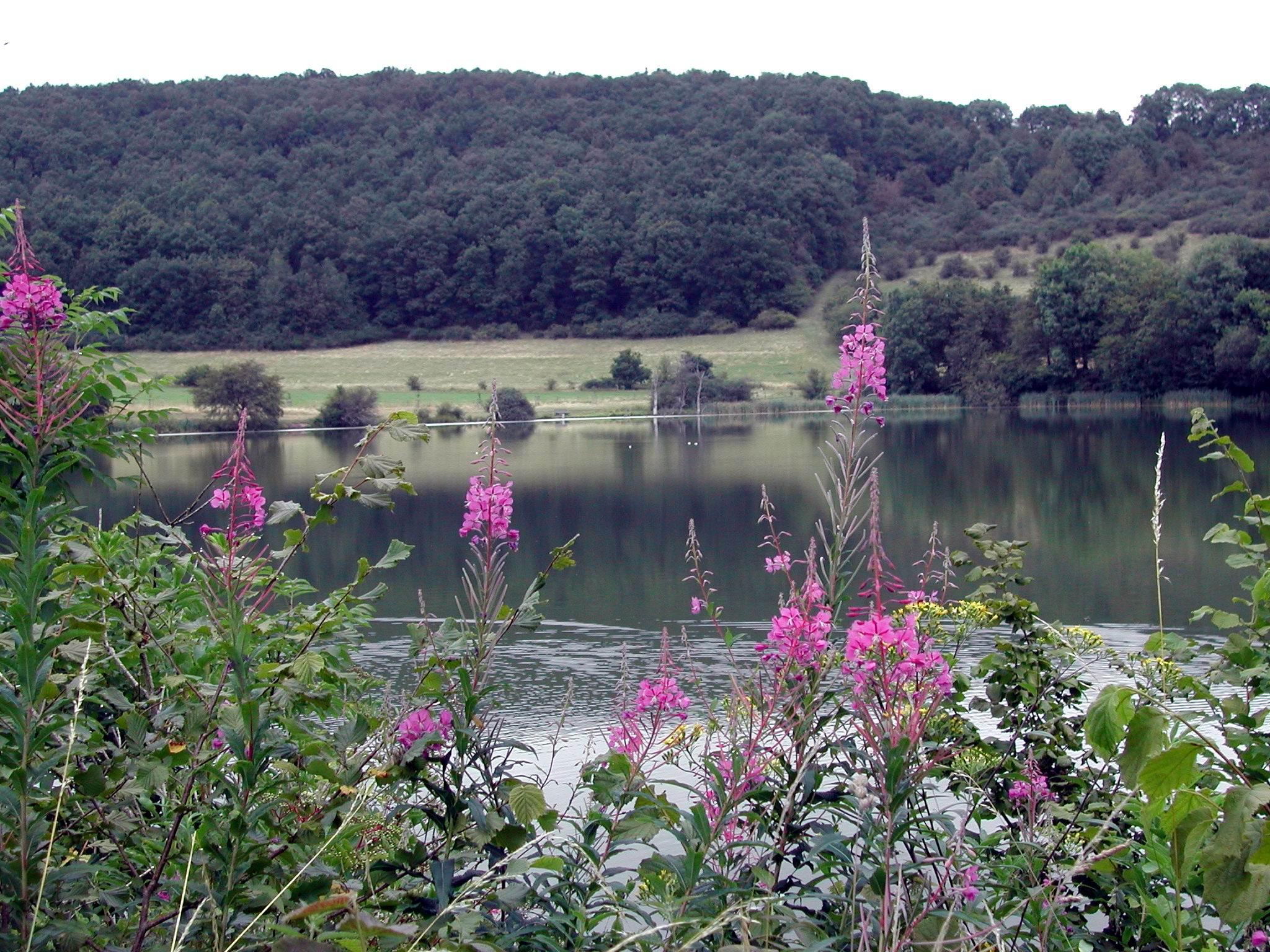
Immerather Maar

The municipality is a recognized tourism resort and lies nestled in a maar crater. Housed in an historical bakehouse (early 18th century) is a small school museum. On the crater's northern edge stands the Dreifaltigkeitskapelle (“Trinity Chapel”), which can be seen far from the village. Although the village stretches almost all the way along Hauptstraße, no through traffic runs through it.

=== Buildings ===
- Graveyard chapel, Kirchweg 1, formerly Saint Wendelin’s Catholic Church (branch church; Filialkirche St. Wendelin), east tower possibly from 16th century, biaxial nave from about 1900, warriors’ memorial 1914–1918, completed after 1945.
- Hauptstraße 65 – former schoolhouse-bakehouse, one-floor building on high base, from 1851, timber framing possibly from 18th century.
- Before Hauptstraße 65 – sandstone Crucifixion Bildstock from 1717.
- Way of the Cross, northwest of the village, 13 stations, quarrystone, from about 1920-1930 (?).
- Wayside chapel, northwest of and above the village, Gothic Revival plaster building, late 19th century.
