= Gemündener Maar =

Lake in the Eifel, Germany

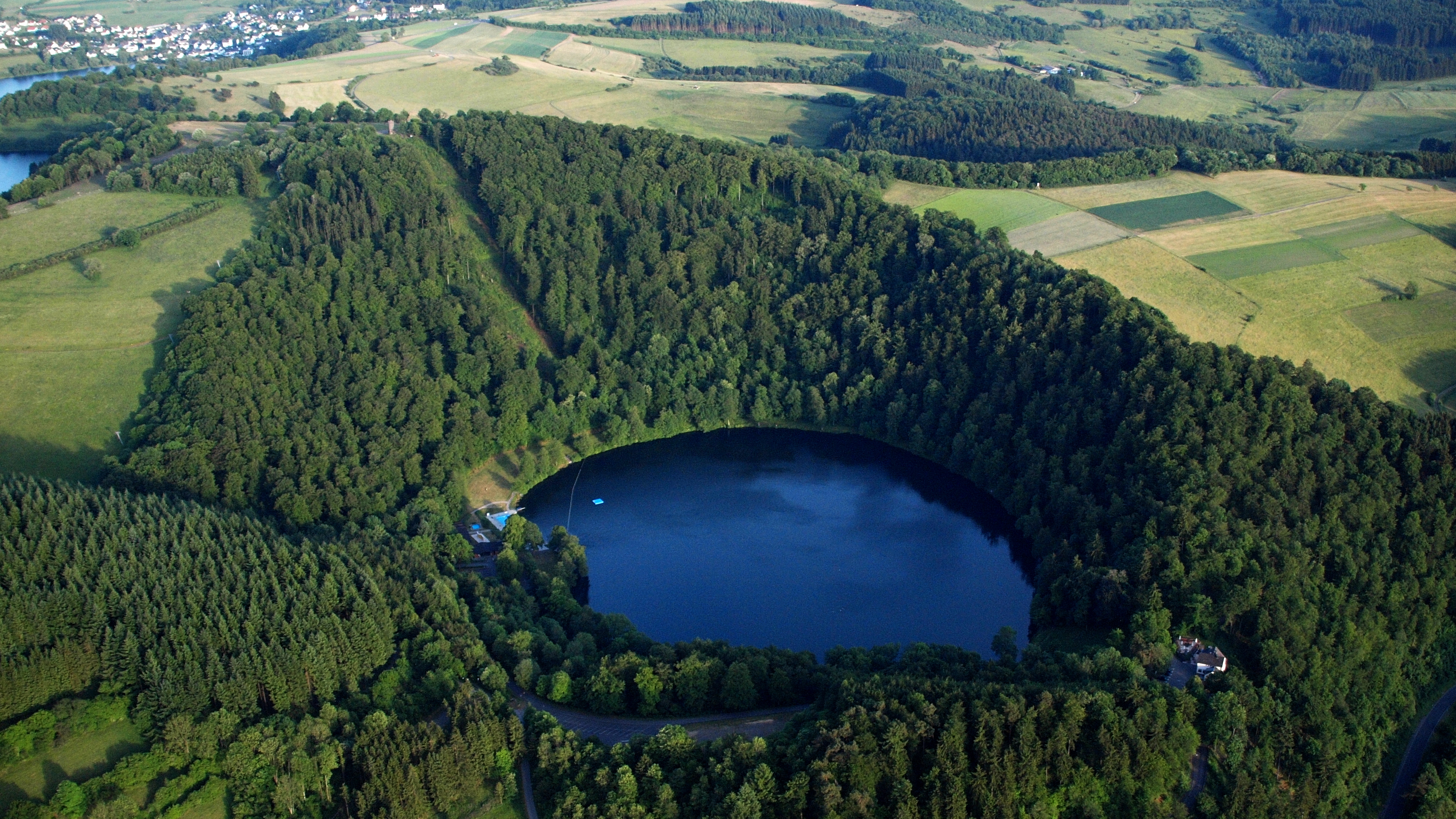
- Gemündener Maar, 2015 aerial photograph

- Location within Rhineland-Palatinate
- Location: Rhineland-Palatinate, Germany
- Coordinates: 50°10′39″N 6°50′11″E
- Basin countries: Germany
- Max. length: 325 meters (1,066 ft)
- Max. width: 300 meters (980 ft)
- Surface area: 7.2 hectares (18 acres)
- Max. depth: 38 meters (125 ft)
- Surface elevation: 406 meters (1,332 ft)

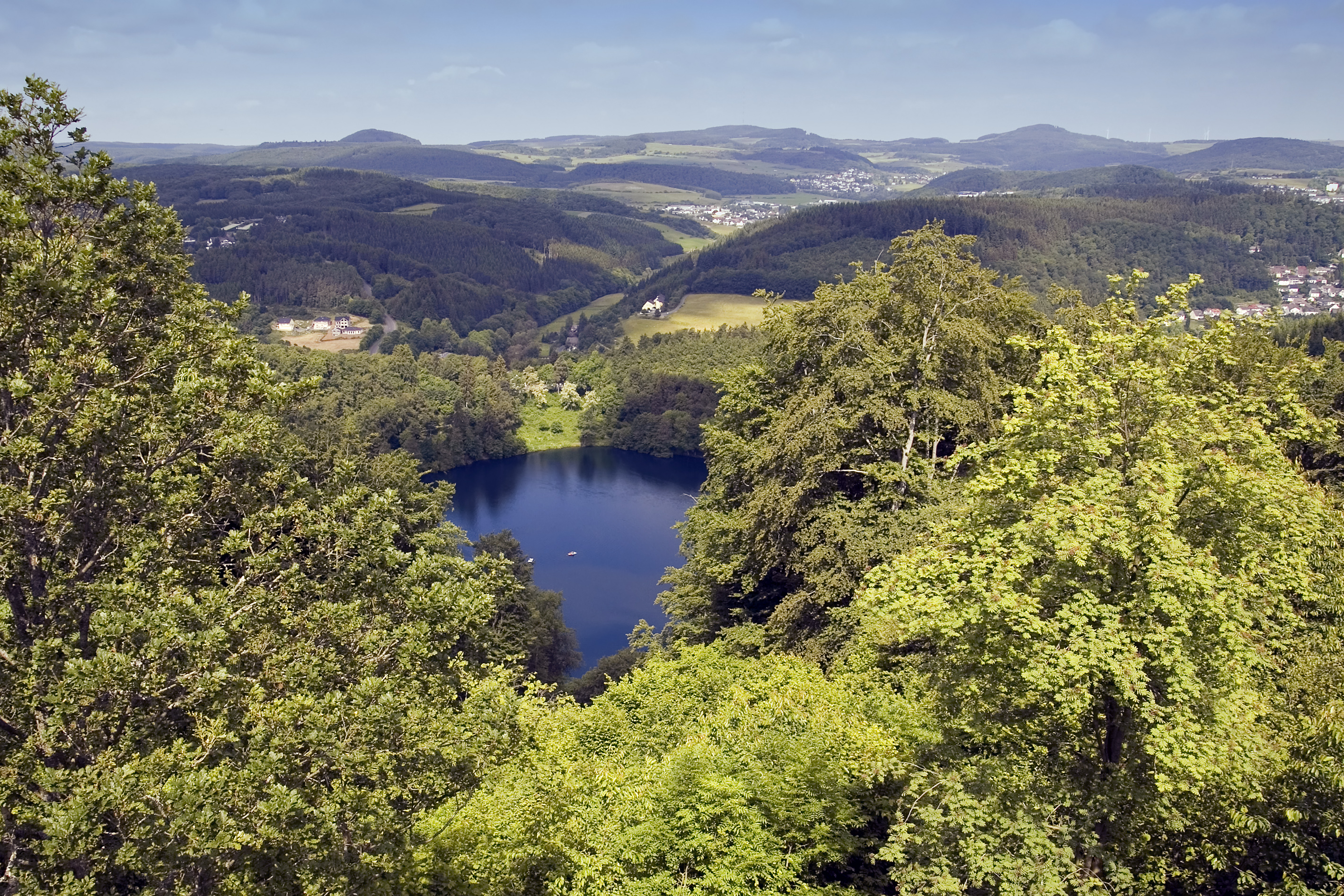
Gemündener Maar

The Gemündener Maar is the northernmost of the three Daun Maars (Dauner Maare). It lies in the immediate vicinity of the village of Gemünden and ca. 1.5 km south of Daun in the Eifel and in the German state of Rhineland-Palatinate.

The maar lake is around 325 meters (1,066 ft) long, 300 meters (980 ft) wide and up to 38 meters (125 ft) deep. It has an area of about 7.2 hectares (18 acres). The maar is 30,000 years old which makes it younger than the Schalkenmehrener Maar (western maar lake and eastern dry maar) and is the smallest of the three maars of Daun. Its water surface lies at an elevation of ca. 406 m above sea level (NN), the floor of the maar at 368 metres above sea level. Parts of the lake are used for bathing in summer, which has a marked effect on the surrounding nature reserve.

The maar was formed by a volcanic steam explosion. All that remains, however, is a narrow ridge of slate, grauwacke and sandstone between the maar and the neighbouring Lieser valley. There is a footpath around the maar on which one can view the Devonian rocks around the lake. Numerous volcanic bombs may be found, especially in the western area of the maar.

== Literature ==
- Werner D'hein: Nationaler Geopark Vulkanland Eifel. Ein Natur- und Kulturführer. Gaasterland-Verlag Düsseldorf, 2006, ISBN 3-935873-15-8
