= Weinfeld =

Weinfeld (Hebrew: ויינפלד) is a surname of Jewish origin and may refer to:

- André Weinfeld
- Edward Weinfeld (1901–1988), American judge
- Miriam Akavia, born: Matylda Weinfeld (1927–2015), Poland-born Israeli writer and translator
- Moshe Weinfeld (1925–2009), Israeli Bible scholar
- Yocheved Weinfeld (born 1947), Poland-born Israeli painter
