= Gour de Tazenat =

Lake in France

Coordinates: 45°59′N 2°59′E

The Gour de Tazenat is a volcanic lake in the French department of Puy-de-Dôme. It was formed by a phreatomagmatic eruption about 29,000 years ago.

== Topography ==
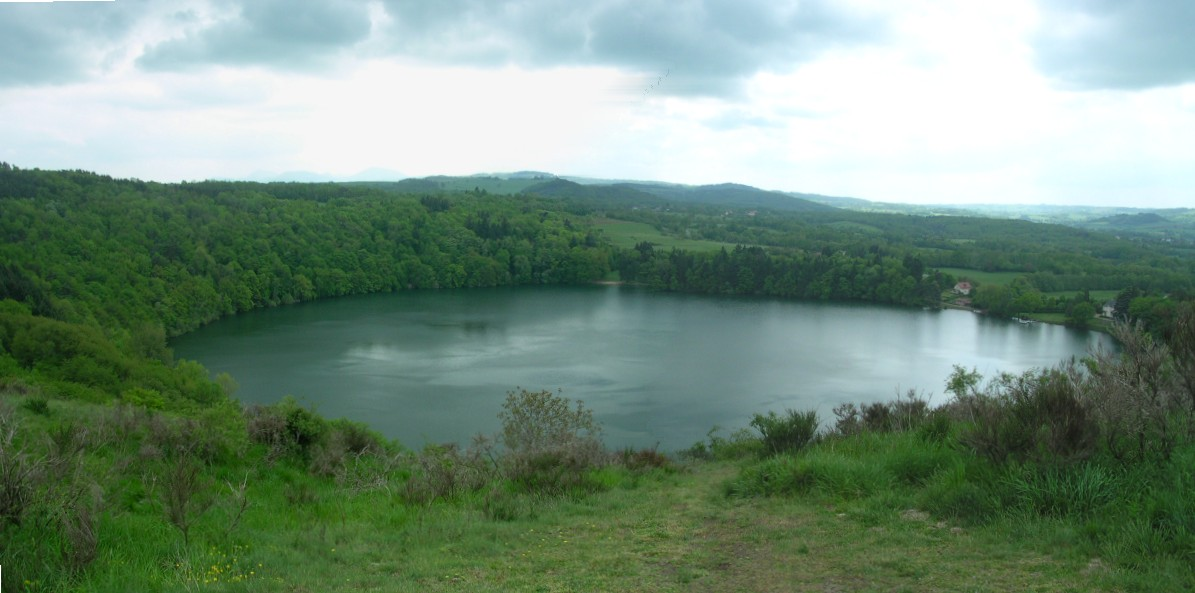
Gour de Tazenat

The lake marks the northern limit of the Chaîne des Puys. It is located in Charbonnières-les-Vieilles, near Manzat in the French department of Puy-de-Dôme. It is 20 kilometres (12 mi) northwest of Riom, 5 kilometres northeast of Manzat and 2.5 kilometres south of Charbonnières-les-Vieilles.

The lake has a depth of 66 metres (217 ft). Its banks, except in the north and northeast, are wooded and have a height of 50 metres (164 ft).

The crater of this volcano is on average 80 metres (262 ft) deep and 700 metres (2,297 ft) wide. A 2.8 km trail can be used to walk around it. Navigation on the lake is prohibited.

== Geology ==
Gour de Tazenat is a volcanic crater formed by a phreatomagmatic eruption. The banks of the lake have a volcanic crescent moon shape (north, east and south) formed by projections arranged in layers. In the stratum at the base, the basaltic volcanic projections, released as blocks, volcanic bombs and pozzolana are mixed with boulders (granite, granulite metamorphic rocks) from the base torn out by violent explosions. The bombs have a cauliflower shape, typical of phreatomagmatic eruptions due to fissures created by contact with water. The setting up of these initial projections corresponds to the beginning of the eruption when magma rises to the surface in contact with continental water. It causes heavy explosions capable of breaking fragments of crystalline basement, and the appearance of volcanic bombs in cauliflower shapes. Thereafter, water is removed and activity becomes more magmatic than phreatic. After cessation of eruptive activity, the Gour de Tazenat gradually filled with rainwater.

== Fauna and flora ==
Aquatic fauna consists of many perch and pike, together with carp, pumpkinseeds, roach, trout and other fish with white flesh.

== History ==
The Gour de Tazenat was formed at least 29,000 years ago, as indicated by sediment cores.

== Literature ==
Guy de Maupassant evokes the lake in his short story Mes vingt-cinq jours ("My Twenty-Five Days"), published in Various Tales in 1885 and in Mont-Oriol in 1887.

== Notes and references ==
- Pierre Boivin et al., "Volcanology of the Chaîne des Puys", 4th edition 2004, published by Regional Nature Park of the Volcanoes of Auvergne, pages 106-108
- Maurice Krafft and François-Dominique LAROUZIERE, "Guide to volcanoes in Europe and the Canaries", Paris, 1991, 455 p. (ISBN 2-603-00813-7), p. 62.64
- Guy de Maupassant - Scan Thierry Selva "My Twenty-Five Days" (online access, The Literature Network)

Specific
