= Dreiser Weiher =

Maar in Rhineland-Palatinate, Germany

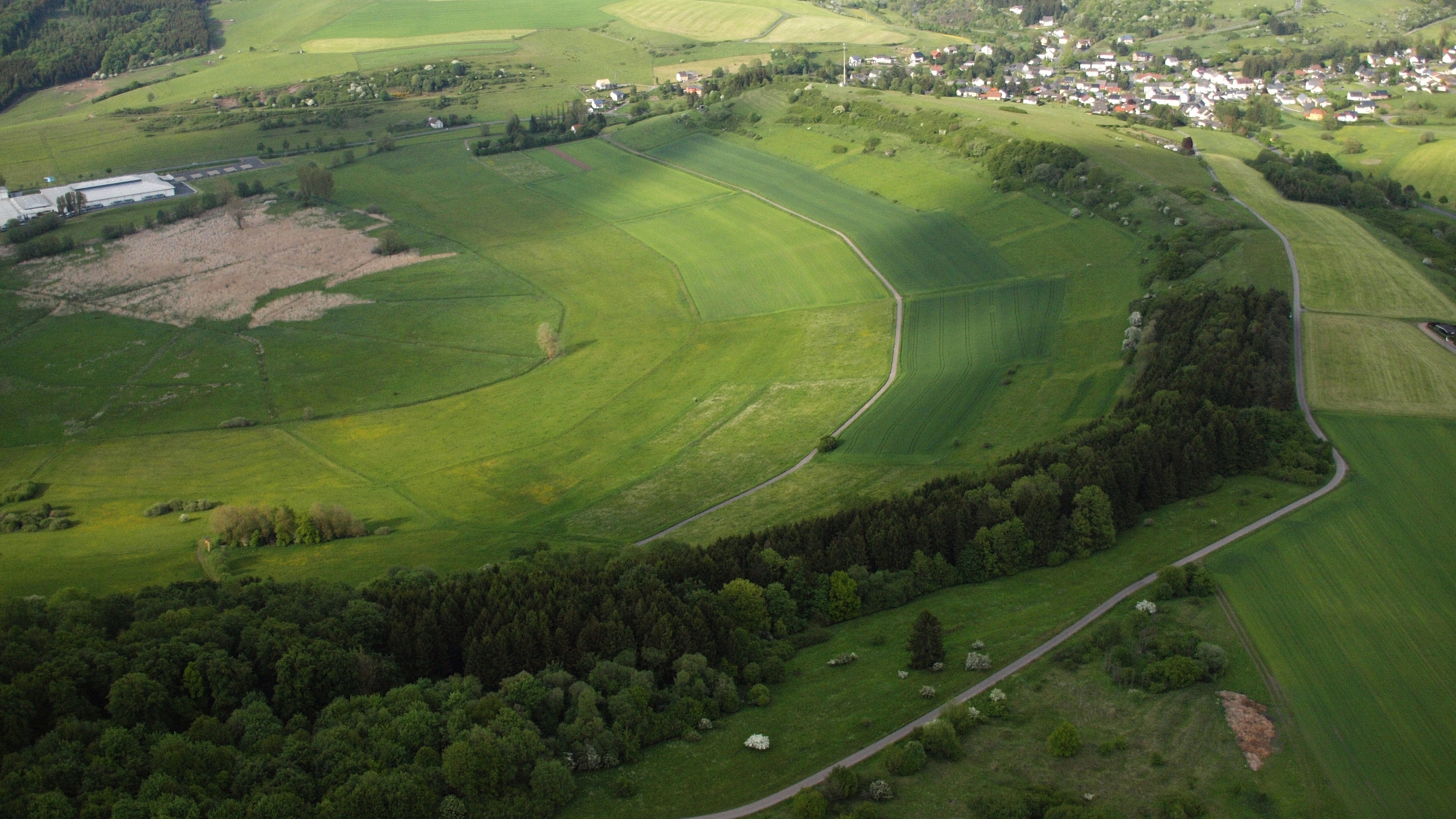
The Dreiser Weiher near Dreis-Brück, 2015 aerial photo

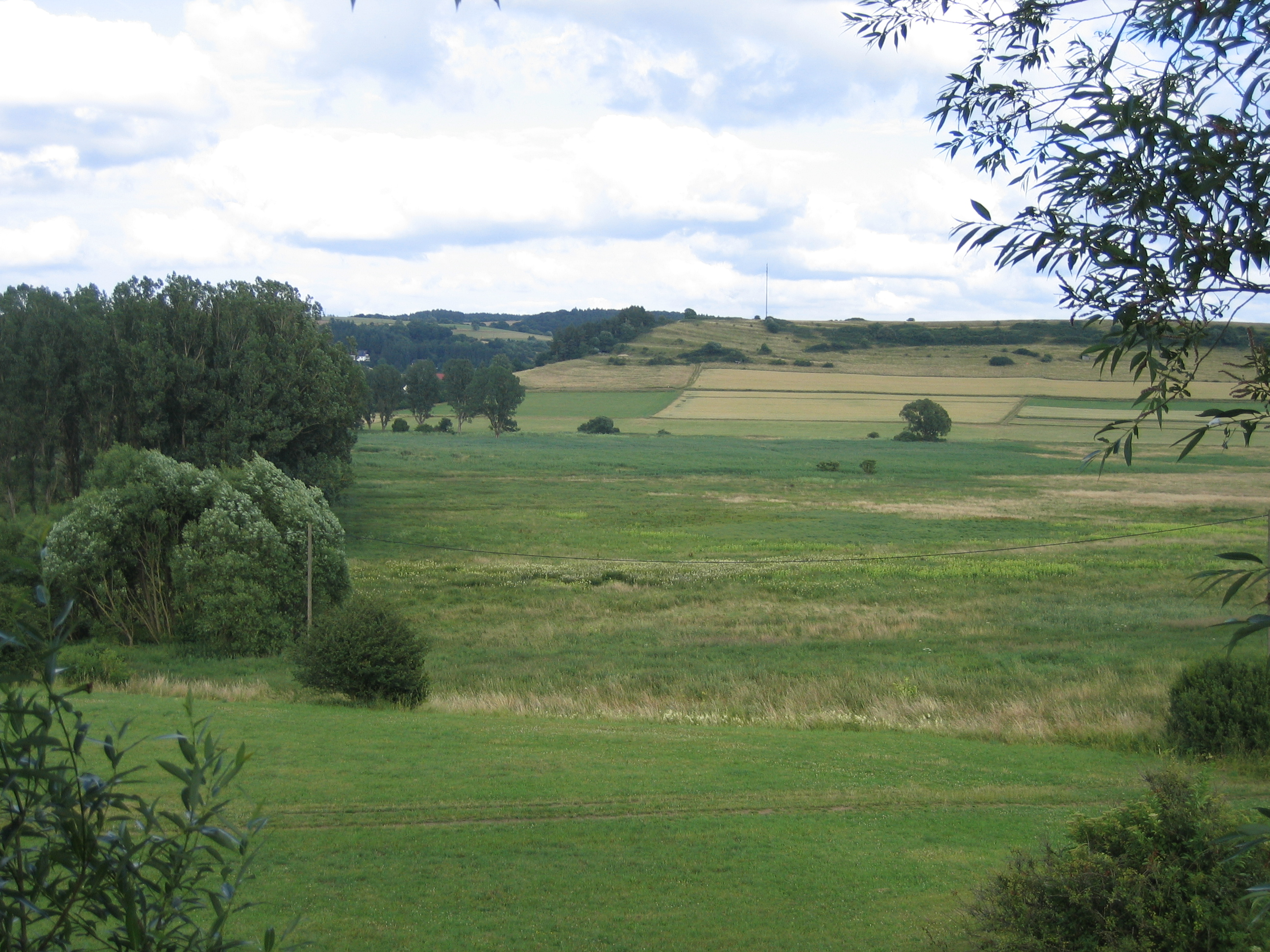
View of the Dreiser Weiher

The Dreiser Weiher near Dreis-Brück in the vicinity of Daun in the German state of Rhineland-Palatinate is a tub-shaped maar in the Eifel mountains. It is up to 1,360 metres long and 1,160 metres wide. It is the second largest maar in the Eifel.

== Formation ==
The dry maar is located on a hillside and belongs to the Quaternary volcanoes of the West Eifel. It is surrounded by a crater rim of between 36 and 120 metres high. From the analysis of volcanic tuffs, which were ejected from the maar during an eruption, and from geomagnetic measurements, five tuff fields and four volcanic centres on the edge of the bowl were identified. In the centre of the maar an eruption site was identified, hence the maar is probably an eruption funnel. The tuffs of the Dreiser Weiher lies above the depositions of the surrounding volcanoes, the maar is thus younger than the others. An exact date for the formation of the maars using pollen analysis could not be done for the Dreiser Weiher since there is no bog here.

So-called olivinite bombs, from the time when the maar was formed, occur in the vicinity. Due to the many, mainly rare minerals and rocks that occur here, the Dreiser Weiher achieved scientific renown early on. It is not clear whether the material here is from the Earth's mantle or whether it is due to magmatic differentiation. Discussions are still ongoing in scientific circles about the origin of the material.

== History of use ==
The former maar lake was drained in the early 19th century. Today its basin is drained by artificial ditches into the Ahbach stream. In the Dreiser Weiher is a commercially used mineral spring, the Nürburg Spring.

The Dreiser Weiher is part of the nature reserve of Dreiser Weiher mit Döhmberg und Börchen.

The Dreiser Weiher is a popular area for paragliders with exceptionally good thermal conditions all year round.

== Literature ==
- Werner P. D´hein: Vulkanland Eifel. Natur- und Kulturführer, mit 26 Stationen der "Deutschen Vulkanstraße". Gaasterland-Verlag, Düsseldorf 2006, ISBN 3-935873-15-8, ISBN 978-3-935873-15-4.
- Wilhelm Meyer: Geologie der Eifel. Schweizerbathsche Verlagsbuchhandlung, 3. Auflage, Stuttgart 1994, ISBN 3-510-65161-8.

_region:DE-RP 50°15′51.6″N 06°46′38.4″E
