= Papenkaule =

Coordinates: 50°13′51″N 6°39′53″E

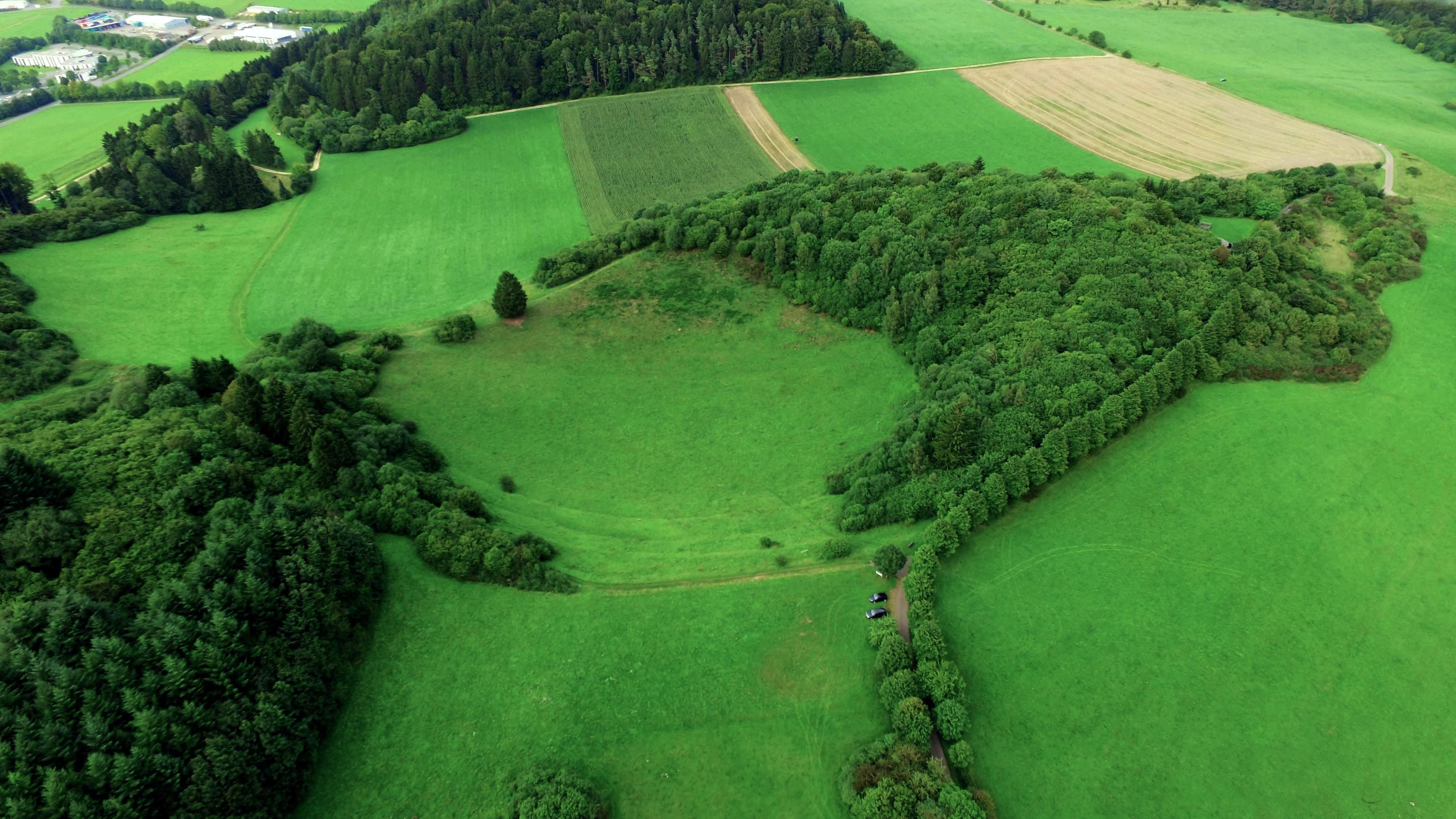
Papenkaule crater

The Papenkaule (also Papenkaul in the local dialect) is a dry crater of a volcano that was active about 10,000 years ago. It lies north of Gerolstein in the Eifel mountains in Germany.

The lava which was released as the result of an explosion did not, however, flow out of the vent of the Papenkaule, but reached the surface to the west of it at the Hagelskaule and streamed southwards into the Kyll valley. Because the bedrock below the Papenkaule is porous dolomite, no crater lake was able to form.

== Literature ==
- Eifel, Ahrtal. (o.A.), Grieben-Verlag, Munich, 1982, ISBN 3-521-00293-4, p. 105
