= Windsborn Crater Lake =

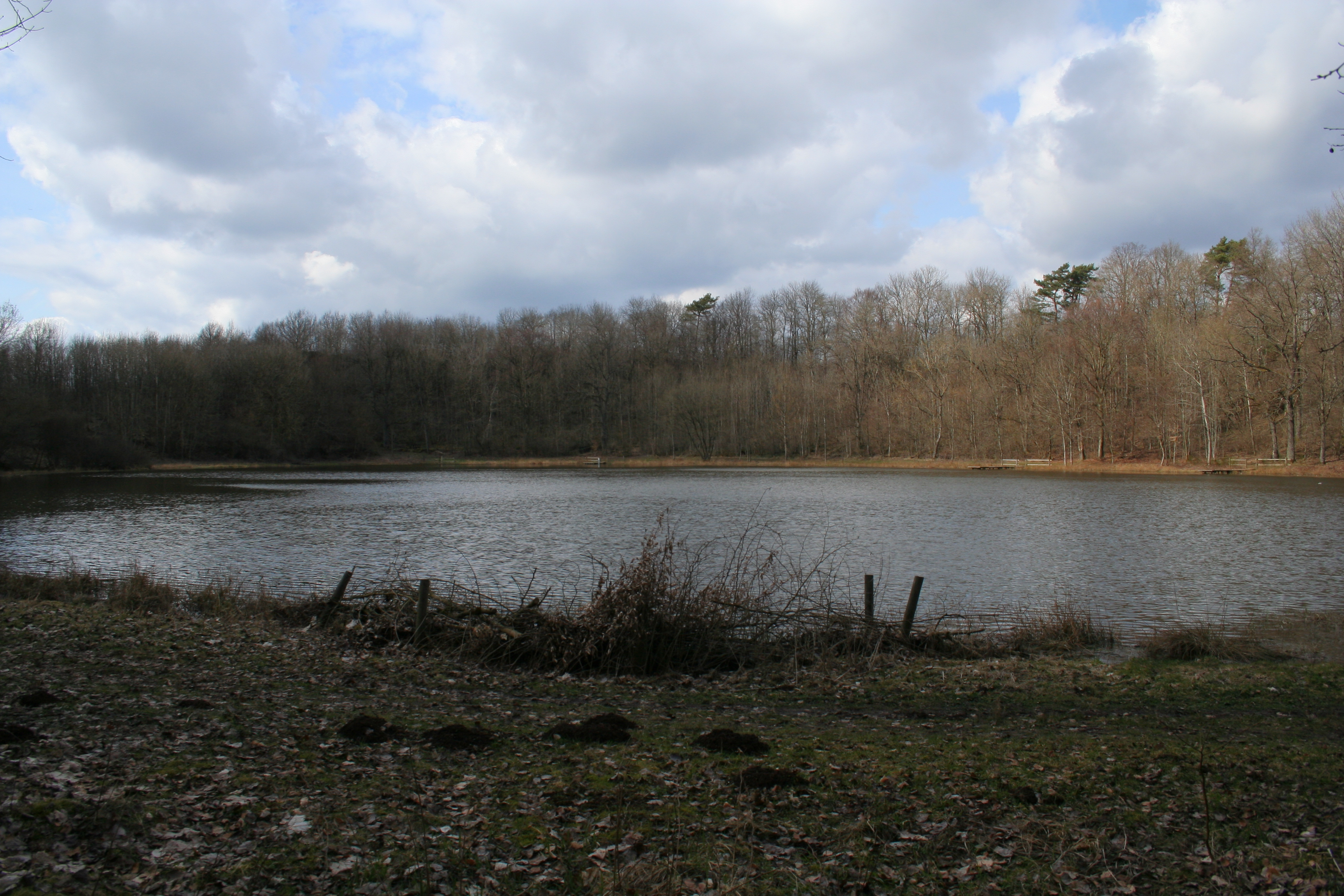
- Windsborn Crater Lake

- Location within Rhineland-Palatinate
- Location: Bernkastel-Wittlich, Rhineland-Palatinate, Germany
- Coordinates: _region:DE-RP 50°05′07″N 6°46′33″E
- Type: Volcanic lake

Windsborn Crater Lake (German: Windsborn-Kratersee) is a water-filled volcanic crater in the Eifel mountains in Germany. It is located near Bettenfeld in the county of Bernkastel-Wittlich and in the state of Rhineland-Palatinate, and belongs to a group of four craters known as the Mosenberg Crater Row (Reihenkrater Mosenberg), named after the village of Mosenberg.

== Location ==
The Windsborn Crater Lake lies in the southwestern part of the Volcanic Eifel within the Volcanic Eifel Nature Park. It is situated 1.2 kilometres east of the village church of Bettenfeld on the north-northwestern part of the Mosenberg hill (517 m above sea level (NHN)) just below the 470 m contour. Viewed from the south the crater lake is the third crater in the Mosenberg Crater Row and lies within the nature reserve of Reihenkrater Mosenberg und Horngraben, to which the fourth crater, the Hinkelsmaar (sometimes called the Hinkelmaar), 330 metres to the north-northeast of Windsborn Crater Lake. The Landesstraße 16 runs past the two craters to the north-northwest and north along the valley of the Ellbach, a small tributary of the Little Kyll. The L 16 links Bettenfeld and the town of Manderscheid, 2.8 kilometres east-northeast of the Windsborn Crater Lake and east of the Little Kyll.
