= Manderscheid, Bitburg-Prüm =

Manderscheid
- Municipality
- Coat of arms

- Location of Manderscheid within Eifelkreis Bitburg-Prüm district
- Interactive map of Manderscheid
- Location within Germany Location within Rhineland-Palatinate
- Coordinates: 50°05′45″N 06°19′38″E
- Country: Germany
- State: Rhineland-Palatinate
- District: Eifelkreis Bitburg-Prüm
- Municipal assoc.: Arzfeld

Government
  - Mayor (2019–24): Ewald Hermes

Area
  - Total: 4.25 km^{2} (1.64 sq mi)
- Elevation: 450 m (1,480 ft)

Population (2025-12-31)
  - Total: 52
  - Density: 12/km^{2} (32/sq mi)
- Time zone: UTC+01:00 (CET)
  - Summer (DST): UTC+02:00 (CEST)
- Postal codes: 54649
- Dialling codes: 06554
- Vehicle registration: BIT
- Website: www.manderscheid-net.de

Manderscheid (German pronunciation: [ˈmandɐʃaɪt]) is a municipality in the district of Bitburg-Prüm, in Rhineland-Palatinate, western Germany.
