= Auderath =

- Municipality
- Coat of arms

- Location of Auderath within Cochem-Zell district
- Interactive map of Auderath
- Location within Germany Location within Rhineland-Palatinate
- Coordinates: 50°11′12.57″N 7°0′9.18″E
- Country: Germany
- State: Rhineland-Palatinate
- District: Cochem-Zell
- Municipal assoc.: Ulmen

Government
  - Mayor (2019–24): Frank Steimers

Area
  - Total: 6.19 km^{2} (2.39 sq mi)
- Elevation: 460 m (1,510 ft)

Population (2025-12-31)
  - Total: 655
  - Density: 106/km^{2} (274/sq mi)
- Time zone: UTC+01:00 (CET)
  - Summer (DST): UTC+02:00 (CEST)
- Postal codes: 56766
- Dialling codes: 02676
- Vehicle registration: COC
- Website: www.ulmen.de

Auderath is an Ortsgemeinde – a municipality belonging to a Verbandsgemeinde, a kind of collective municipality – in the Cochem-Zell district in Rhineland-Palatinate, Germany. It belongs to the Verbandsgemeinde of Ulmen, whose seat is in the like-named town.

== Geography ==
The tourist resort of Auderath is located in the Vulkaneifel, a part of the Eifel known for its volcanic history, geographical and geological features, and even ongoing activity today, including gases that sometimes well up from the earth. The municipality lies some 3 km southeast of Ulmen. To Alflen and the Büchel Airbase (Fliegerhorst Büchel) in Büchel in the east it is 2 km. To the south lie Schmitt and Gillenbeuren, and to the southwest Filz and Wollmerath. On a broader scale, Auderath lies between Trier (about 75 km away) and Koblenz (about 60 km away, in each case by Autobahn).

== History ==
Auderath stood under the lordship of the Electorate of Trier and the Lords of Ulmen. In 1573, Trier became the overlord for good. Auderath belonged to the Electoral-Trier Amt of Ulmen. Beginning in 1794, Auderath lay under French rule. In 1815 it was assigned to the Kingdom of Prussia at the Congress of Vienna. Under Prussia, the village belonged to the Bürgermeisterei (“Mayoralty”) of Lutzerath and beginning in 1816 to the Cochem district. Since 1946, it has been part of the then newly founded state of Rhineland-Palatinate.

== Politics ==
=== Municipal council ===
The council is made up of 12 council members, who were elected by majority vote at the municipal election held on 7 June 2009, and the honorary mayor as chairman.

=== Mayor ===
Auderath’s mayor is Frank Steimers.

=== Coat of arms ===
The German blazon reads: Schild durch eingeschweifte gestürzte goldene Spitze, darin eine grüne Krone, gespalten. Vorn in Grün ein silberner Korb mit goldenen Broten, hinten in Grün eine silberne Henkelurne.

The municipality’s arms might in English heraldic language be described thus: Tierced in mantle reversed, dexter vert a basket argent therein loaves of bread Or, sinister vert an urn of the second, in chief Or a crown azure.

The crown in the gold field refers to Our Lady of the Rosary, who is the parish’s patron saint. The basket with the loaves of bread in the green field recalls an old custom in the municipality, that of giving out Saint Sebastian’s bread in the church (observed on 5 February). The urn stands for digs undertaken in the municipality between 1936 and 1940, which unearthed Roman burial mounds, wall remnants and potsherds in the cadastral areas of Seitert and Hinterschläf. The tincture vert (green) refers to the village’s founding as a country estate at the time of the clearings in the High Middle Ages, and also to the still rural scenery found in the municipality today.

== Culture and sightseeing ==
=== Buildings ===
The following are listed buildings or sites in Rhineland-Palatinate’s Directory of Cultural Monuments:

- Catholic Church of Our Lady of the Rosary (Kirche Rosenkranzkönigin), Kirchstraße – Baroque aisleless church, 1734, expanded 1952; inside a limestone altar and a bell from 1481.
- Hauptstraße/corner of Kirchstraße – well with pyramidal roof, 18th century.
- Kirchstraße/corner of Brunnenstraße – wayside cross from 1657.
- Auderather Mühle, west of the village – timber-frame mill, partly solid or slated, bakehouse.
- Kloster St. Josef, northeast of the village – Barefoot-Carmelite convent from the 1920s and 1930s.

=== Regular events ===
Each year at Whitsun, a forest festival is held at the Matteshütte.

=== Clubs ===
- Volunteer fire brigade
- Alemannia Auderath sport club
- Auderath riding club
- Gesangverein Liederkranz Auderath (singing club)
- Möhnenverein (club for Möhnen or “women fools”, a Shrovetide/Carnival tradition)
- Catholic youth group
