= Winkel, Rhineland-Palatinate =

Winkel
- Municipality
- Coat of arms

- Location of Winkel within Vulkaneifel district
- Interactive map of Winkel
- Location within Germany Location within Rhineland-Palatinate
- Coordinates: 50°8′45.29″N 6°56′36.12″E
- Country: Germany
- State: Rhineland-Palatinate
- District: Vulkaneifel
- Municipal assoc.: Daun

Government
  - Mayor (2019–24): Jörg Prescher

Area
  - Total: 6.69 km^{2} (2.58 sq mi)
- Elevation: 360 m (1,180 ft)

Population (2025-12-31)
  - Total: 143
  - Density: 21.4/km^{2} (55.4/sq mi)
- Time zone: UTC+01:00 (CET)
  - Summer (DST): UTC+02:00 (CEST)
- Postal codes: 54558
- Dialling codes: 06573
- Vehicle registration: DAU

Winkel (German pronunciation: [ˈvɪŋkl̩]) is an Ortsgemeinde – a municipality belonging to a Verbandsgemeinde, a kind of collective municipality – in the Vulkaneifel district in Rhineland-Palatinate, Germany. It belongs to the Verbandsgemeinde of Daun, whose seat is in the like-named town.

== Geography ==
=== Location ===
The municipality lies in the Vulkaneifel, a part of the Eifel known for its volcanic history, geographical and geological features, and even ongoing activity today, including gases that sometimes well up from the earth.

=== Constituent communities ===
Winkel's Ortsteile are Niederwinkel and Oberwinkel.

== History ==
In 1143, Winkel had its first documentary mention as Winkela in a document in which King Conrad III of Germany confirmed the Springiersbach Monastery's holdings in Winkel. Fifty years later, in 1193, Henry VI, Holy Roman Emperor reconfirmed the Monastery's holdings.

The land where Winkel now stands was already settled in pre-Christian times. In the spring of 1958, barrows were found at the northwest municipal limit. These were investigated by the Trier State Museum (Landesmuseum Trier). Some barrows had been destroyed by agricultural activities, but one was quite intact and well preserved. It was 2.9 m long and 1.1 m wide. The museum's investigation found that the body lay in a log halved lengthwise and hollowed out to form a kind of coffin. At the man's feet lay grave goods: a "potbellied" pot and a dish. Also found was a lance whose head was about 32 cm long. The barrow was originally roughly 1.5 m high and 15 m in diameter.

The graves found in Winkel are characteristic of the so-called older Hunsrück-Eifel Culture of the 6th and 5th centuries BC.

In the Middle Ages, the estate of Oberwinkel and the outlying centre of Niederwinkel belonged to the Lordship of Wollmerath and its attendant court jurisdiction. This lordship comprised the villages of Wollmerath, Filz, Wagenhausen and Niederwinkel, several mills (among them one in Winkel) and estates (among them the great estate in Oberwinkel, whose chapel still stands). Wollmerath was an hereditary fief held by the Counts of Wied. The overlords were Electoral Palatinate and, beginning in 1309, the Electorate of Trier. The Counts enfeoffed various lordly families with their Wollmerath landholding over the centuries: Berg (1241), Thurnstößer (1260), Mainfelder (1364), von Sötern (1503), von Kretzig called Mertloch (1536), von Metzenhausen (1567), von Zandt (1597) and finally von Landenberg (beginning in 1698). In a document from the 14th century, the estate of Oberwinkel is mentioned as being a Springiersbach Monastery holding. The estate was, however, much older than that.

The Oberwinkel estate's importance can also be established by its having its own Weistum (a Weistum – cognate with English wisdom – was a legal pronouncement issued by men learned in law in the Middle Ages and early modern times), which was even confirmed in writing and notarized by the Springiersbach Monastery on 13 January 1494. Laid out in the Weistum is the age-old law passed down by word of mouth, renewed each year at the Dingtag before the whole community so that it would last through the generations. At this Dingtag, the municipal area was exactly described and boundary markers were renewed or established. Also, the municipality confirmed who the lord was and who exercised jurisdiction. The Oberwinkel estate held its own Dingtag, which was opened with a peal from the churchbells. The estate was lease- and tithe-free, although the estate's holder was obliged to provide compulsory labour for the overlord (Springiersbach Monastery) with six horses and two farmhands. Whoever held the estate in any given year also had to lay on food and drink at the Dingtag for all the Schöffen (roughly "lay jurists") and their servants who had come to the meeting. In the 1563 Feuerbuch ("Fire Book"), the only person mentioned for Oberwinkel was the estate holder, whereas three were mentioned for Niederwinkel: the estate holder (of the Springiersbach estate of Niederwinkel), the schoemecher ("shoemaker"; Schuhmacher in Modern High German) Somer Frantz (who was also later mentioned as a miller) and der weber ("the weaver"). Niederwinkel with the estate and three further houses may have had 25 to 30 inhabitants. The estate of Oberwinkel seems to have come through the Thirty Years' War relatively unscathed. Nevertheless, neediness within the Lordship of Wollmerath was very great. The feudal lord, Ludwig Zandt, appealed in 1630, during the war, to the Elector in Trier to avert the occupation of the "Imperial Baronial Region of Wollmerath". "The villages in the Lordship of Wollmerath had all but died out, the mills were not working. One village was burnt down in 1630. Seeding and harvest did not happen, the land was full of warriors." The estate of Niederwinkel seems to have been less lucky than the one at Oberwinkel, having fallen victim to the war.

When the French Revolution reached the Rhineland and the monasterial holdings were confiscated by the French state, the hereditary landhold arrangement between the Springiersbach Monastery and the estate of Oberwinkel was also dissolved. Both the estate of Oberwinkel and the farmers at Niederwinkel were obliged to yield up great amounts of produce to the occupying French forces.

In 1804, the estate was auctioned off. The lot included: one house, a yard, a barn, a stable, a sheep farm, girding wall, garden, 18 ha of cropland, 24 ha of wild and fallow land and 7.06 ha of meadowland. It was assessed as being worth 4,088 francs; its final sale price was 8,000 francs. The estate went to the old estate holder, Josef Matthias Maas, whose forebears had held the estate for 200 years. The family Maas lived on the estate until 1916. In 1922, Dr. August Cnyrim, a former notary, and his wife Marie née Hellwig acquired the estate as a retirement seat, and they had the estate run by tenants. The husband and wife were both buried in the estate chapel. In the 1960s, the whole estate but for this chapel was razed for housing development, even though the chapel and the manor house were under monumental protection. Even the chapel was threatened with downfall – albeit from disrepair, not by development – before the little church was restored with support from the state of Rhineland-Palatinate, the district, the Ortsgemeinde and private donors. The chapel still stands today at the entrance to the village as the only remaining trace of the estate of Oberwinkel.

Besides the Wollmerather Mühle ("Wollmerath Mill") and the Heckenmühle ("Hedge Mill") there was also a gristmill in Niederwinkel. It was mentioned on the occasion of its leasing in 1555 to Franz and Christina Sommer, but was likely destroyed in the Thirty Years' War.

== Politics ==
=== Municipal council ===
The council is made up of 6 council members, who were elected by majority vote at the municipal election held on 7 June 2009, and the honorary mayor as chairman.

=== Mayor ===
Winkel's mayor is Jörg Prescher, and his deputy is Friedhelm Jax.

=== Coat of arms ===
The German blazon reads: Unter silbernem Schildhaupt, darin eine rote Zange, in Rot ein schwebender silberner Sparren, begleitet von 3 (2:1) silbernen Ringen.

The municipality's arms might in English heraldic language be described thus: Gules a chevron humetty between three annulets argent, on a chief of the second tongs fesswise of the first.

Niederwinkel and the estate of Oberwinkel belonged to the Lordship of Wollmerath. Beginning in 1597, the lordship belonged to Lord Zandt von Merl. Odilie von Zandt wed Adam Heinrich von Landenberg in 1698, thereby bringing Winkel into the Landenberg family's ownership. This family bore three silver rings, or annulets, in their arms. This same charge has been taken up in today's municipal arms. The chevron is canting for the municipality's name, Winkel, which in German literally means "angle". Borne in the chief is a pair of tongs, Saint Apollonia’s attribute, thus representing the municipality's and the church's patron saint. Winkel belonged to the Electoral-Trier Amt of Daun, which inspired the choice of tinctures, argent and gules (silver and red), which were the ones borne by Trier.

The arms have been borne since 20 March 1990.

== Culture and sightseeing ==
=== Buildings ===
==== Niederwinkel ====
- Saint Apollonia’s Catholic Church (branch church; Filialkirche St. Apollonia), Hauptstraße 8 – triaxial aisleless church, 18th century, bears year 1934 (possibly renovation work or new building?).
- Hauptstraße 9 – Quereinhaus (a combination residential and commercial house divided for these two purposes down the middle, perpendicularly to the street) from 1841.
- Hauptstraße 13 – Quereinhaus, mid 19th century.
- Heiligenhäuschen (a small, shrinelike structure consecrated to a saint or saints), south of the village – round enclosed walled structure, 18th/19th century.

==== Oberwinkel ====
- Kapellenstraße 3 – former estate chapel, biaxial plastered building, mid 19th century.
