= Gevenich =

- Municipality
- Location of Gevenich within Cochem-Zell district
- Interactive map of Gevenich
- Location within Germany Location within Rhineland-Palatinate
- Coordinates: 50°9′13.55″N 7°5′7.80″E
- Country: Germany
- State: Rhineland-Palatinate
- District: Cochem-Zell
- Municipal assoc.: Ulmen

Government
  - Mayor (2019–24): Walter Brauns

Area
  - Total: 7.12 km^{2} (2.75 sq mi)
- Elevation: 390 m (1,280 ft)

Population (2025-12-31)
  - Total: 658
  - Density: 92.4/km^{2} (239/sq mi)
- Time zone: UTC+01:00 (CET)
  - Summer (DST): UTC+02:00 (CEST)
- Postal codes: 56825
- Dialling codes: 02678
- Vehicle registration: COC
- Website: www.gevenich.com

Gevenich is an Ortsgemeinde – a municipality belonging to a Verbandsgemeinde, a kind of collective municipality – in the Cochem-Zell district in Rhineland-Palatinate, Germany. It belongs to the Verbandsgemeinde of Ulmen, whose seat is in the like-named town.

== Geography ==
The municipality lies in the Eifel at the eastern edge of the Verbandsgemeinde of Ulmen about 5 km west of Cochem and the Moselle. It has an elevation of 400 m above sea level and an area of roughly 710 ha.

== History ==
In 1051, Gevenich had its first documentary mention in a document from Emperor Heinrich III. Beginning in 1476, the Electorate of Trier was Gevenich's sole landholder. With the French Revolutionary occupation in 1794, Gevenich passed as part of the Arrondissement of Koblenz, along with Weiler, to the Canton of Lutzerath. In 1815 Gevenich was assigned to the Kingdom of Prussia at the Congress of Vienna. Lean years in the mid 19th century and the attendant emigration by the poorer sectors of the population, either voluntary or forced by the municipality, reduced the population figure by a third. Since 1946, Gevenich has been part of the then newly founded state of Rhineland-Palatinate.

== Politics ==
=== Municipal council ===
The council is made up of 12 council members, who were elected by majority vote at the municipal election held on 7 June 2009, and the honorary mayor as chairman.

=== Mayor ===
Gevenich's mayor is Walter Brauns.

=== Coat of arms ===
The German blazon reads: In Schwarz ein schrägrechter Abtstab, begleitet oben von drei goldenen Ähren, unten von einem goldenen Hirschkopf mit Kreuz.

The municipality's arms might in English heraldic language be described thus: Sable issuant from base an abbot's staff bendwise argent, in chief sinister three ears of wheat Or, in base dexter a stag's head caboshed with attires, the sinister surmounting the abbot's staff, and ensigned with a cross Latin of the last.

The abbot's staff refers to Brauweiler Abbey near Cologne, which beginning in 1051 had holdings in Gevenich granted it by Polish Queen Richeza, Emperor Otto II's granddaughter, who is believed to have lived for a few years in neighbouring Klotten. The three ears of wheat refer to both the earlier settlement that was founded in a clearing here in Roman times and today's agricultural pursuits. The stag's head with the cross is Saint Hubert’s attribute, thus representing the church's patron saint; he has held this honour since 1716 and an altar in the church is dedicated to him.

The arms have been borne since 6 November 1979.

== Culture and sightseeing ==
=== Buildings ===
The following are listed buildings or sites in Rhineland-Palatinate’s Directory of Cultural Monuments:

- Saint Hubert’s Catholic Church (Kirche St. Hubertus), Hauptstraße 42 – Romanesque east tower; sandstone wayside cross, from 1711; basalt graveyard cross, 19th or 20th century
- Hauptstraße 27 – former Quereinhaus (a combination residential and commercial house divided for these two purposes down the middle, perpendicularly to the street); timber-frame building, partly solid, early 18th century
- Hauptstraße 31 – estate along the street; timber-frame house, partly solid, 19th century
- Kirchstraße 7 – Quereinhaus; timber-frame building, partly solid, plastered and slated, 18th or 19th century
- On Landesstraße (State Road) 16 – wayside cross, 18th century
- Outside Gevenich – grave cross, from 1632
- North of Gevenich – wayside chapel; plastered building, partly timber-frame, 18th or 19th century; Pietà, 1848

The municipality's church also has an altar dedicated to Saint Hubert.

== Economy and infrastructure ==
=== Education ===
- Catholic kindergarten

== Famous people ==
- Adolf Ley, priest, Member of the Provincial Landtag
- Peter Schmitz (b. 1955), Member of the Landtag
