= Beuren, Cochem-Zell =

Beuren
- Municipality
- Location of Beuren within Cochem-Zell district
- Interactive map of Beuren
- Location within Germany Location within Rhineland-Palatinate
- Coordinates: 50°5′40″N 7°4′42″E
- Country: Germany
- State: Rhineland-Palatinate
- District: Cochem-Zell
- Municipal assoc.: Ulmen

Government
  - Mayor (2023–24): Sandra Hendges-Steffens

Area
  - Total: 10.67 km^{2} (4.12 sq mi)
- Elevation: 420 m (1,380 ft)

Population (2025-12-31)
  - Total: 440
  - Density: 41/km^{2} (110/sq mi)
- Time zone: UTC+01:00 (CET)
  - Summer (DST): UTC+02:00 (CEST)
- Postal codes: 56825
- Dialling codes: 02675
- Vehicle registration: COC

Beuren (German pronunciation: [ˈbɔʏʁən]) is an Ortsgemeinde – a municipality belonging to a Verbandsgemeinde, a kind of collective municipality – in the Cochem-Zell district in Rhineland-Palatinate, Germany. It belongs to the Verbandsgemeinde of Ulmen, whose seat is in the like-named town.

== Geography ==
Beuren, which is found on the heights above the Moselle, lies in the Vordereifel (“Further Eifel” – not to be confused with the Verbandsgemeinde of Vordereifel, which is in the Mayen-Koblenz district), only 5 km upstream from Bremm on the Moselle. The municipality has an elevation of roughly 400 m above sea level and an area of roughly 1 000 ha. There are about 500 inhabitants.

== Name ==
There are 15 places in Germany named Beuren, all of which likely draw their names from German words such as bauen (“raise”, “cultivate”), bebauen (“farm” in the verbal meaning) and Bauern (“peasants”, “farmers”).

== History ==
About the year 1920 during building excavation work, a whole underground maze of passageways some 1.8 m high with peaked ceilings, well preserved inside a cliff, was unearthed. The walls showed no trace of any work done with the customary striking tools, but rather they had been painstakingly hewn out of the stone with thrusting tools. Here and there, narrow shafts leading up to the surface had been bored, through which spoil might have been lifted in leather sacks. The apparent use of thrusting tools has given rise to the supposition that this maze of tunnels might have been the Romans’ work.

Evidence of a Roman presence has also come to light at the municipality's “castle”. This complex is known as such (Burg in German) on the assumption that something resembling a castle must once have stood there. All that can be seen nowadays is a ring-shaped earthen wall thirty metres across and one metre high. Nevertheless, it was here that potsherds of Roman origin were found during drainage works. Whether this ring was the wall around a Roman watchtower – a burgus to use the word that the Romans borrowed from Germanic speech – or the bank of a Roman pond in a garden complex with a castle on the hillock next to it is unknown. However, a Roman origin seems to be beyond doubt.

Also lending weight to the proposition that there was a Roman presence in what is now Beuren is a find made a few hundred metres from the “castle”, the remnants of a Roman road. It lay one metre below the modern surface, which given the rate of wind deposition in the Eifel dates the find to about 2,000 years ago.

Local recorded history, however, can shed no light on the puzzle represented by these finds. Beuren itself was a late founding, arising about 1300, and in 1744 consisted of three estates, one belonging to the Stuben Monastery, one being an Electoral-Trier holding and one being held by the Pyrmonts. The boundaries between these three estates all met right near the “castle”, at the “Hargarten”. This might mean that settlement began on the foundations of the Roman complex.

Many cadastral names in Beuren are of mediaeval or even later origin. There is, however, one traditional cadastral area whose name suggests an earlier origin. It is called the “Mur”. Murus in Latin means “wall” or “fortification”, which along with the archaeological finds points to Roman beginnings.

Beginning in 1794, Beuren lay under French rule. In 1815 it was assigned to the Kingdom of Prussia at the Congress of Vienna.

For Beuren, the year 1834 was fateful. A great fire all but destroyed the whole village, killing one man. Also claimed by the flames were a great deal of livestock and grain stocks. The local poet from Beuren described the village's plight in one of her poems.

Between 1845 and 1860, many people from Beuren emigrated. Neediness, poverty and hunger were to blame for these people's quest for a new livelihood in the United States or Brazil. At the turn of the 20th century, a veritable flight from the countryside set in. Many inhabitants, mainly from the younger generations, moved to Germany's industrial centres and took on work there, and a great number of them also chose to settle there.

After the Second World War, Beuren experienced a huge economic upswing. Many inhabitants worked at industrial jobs and the agricultural structure that had once characterized Beuren declined.

Since 1946, Beuren has been part of the then newly founded state of Rhineland-Palatinate.

== Politics ==
=== Municipal council ===
The council is made up of 8 council members, who were elected by majority vote at the municipal election held on 26 May 2019, and the honorary mayor as chairman.

=== Mayor ===
Beuren's mayor is Sandra Hendges-Steffens, and her deputies are Karl-Heinz Heinz and Gerhard Schneiders.

=== Coat of arms ===
The municipality's arms might be described thus: Tierced in mantle dexter argent issuant from base a cross tau sable, hanging on each arm a bell gules, sinister Or three ears of wheat slipped vert, the two outer ones with blades, in base vert an urn with two handles of the first.

== Culture and sightseeing ==
=== Buildings ===
The following are listed buildings or sites in Rhineland-Palatinate’s Directory of Cultural Monuments:

- Saint Anthony’s Catholic Parish Church (Pfarrkirche St. Antonius), Unterdorfstraße 1 – possibly Late Gothic quire, Baroque aisleless church possibly from 1716, fourth axis and tower from 1848.
- Hofstraße (no number) – former school 1832-1845, architect F. Nebel, Koblenz.
- Oberdorfstraße 1 – former communal bakehouse, Quereinhaus (a combination residential and commercial house divided for these two purposes down the middle, perpendicularly to the street), partly timber-frame, hipped mansard roof, main body 18th century, expansion 1926.
- Oberdorfstraße 9 – estate complex, early 19th century, timber-frame house, partly solid, timber-frame barn.
- Oberdorfstraße 14 – estate complex from 1835, timber-frame house, partly solid.
- Schulstraße, graveyard – graveyard cross from 1845, before it a tomb.
- Chapel, on Landesstraße (State Road) 103 towards Bad Bertrich near the Beurener Mühle (mill) – with a Christ figure from the very late Gothic period.

=== Sport and leisure ===
Beuren has various hiking possibilities to, for instance, a local waterfall. Other choices include hikes to the Schorker-Höhl (cave), the Vier-Seen-Blick (“Four-Lake-View”), the Echo-Bank, the Hohe Lay (“High Rock”) and the Kuckuckslay (“Cuckoo’s Rock”).
