= Urschmitt =

- Municipality
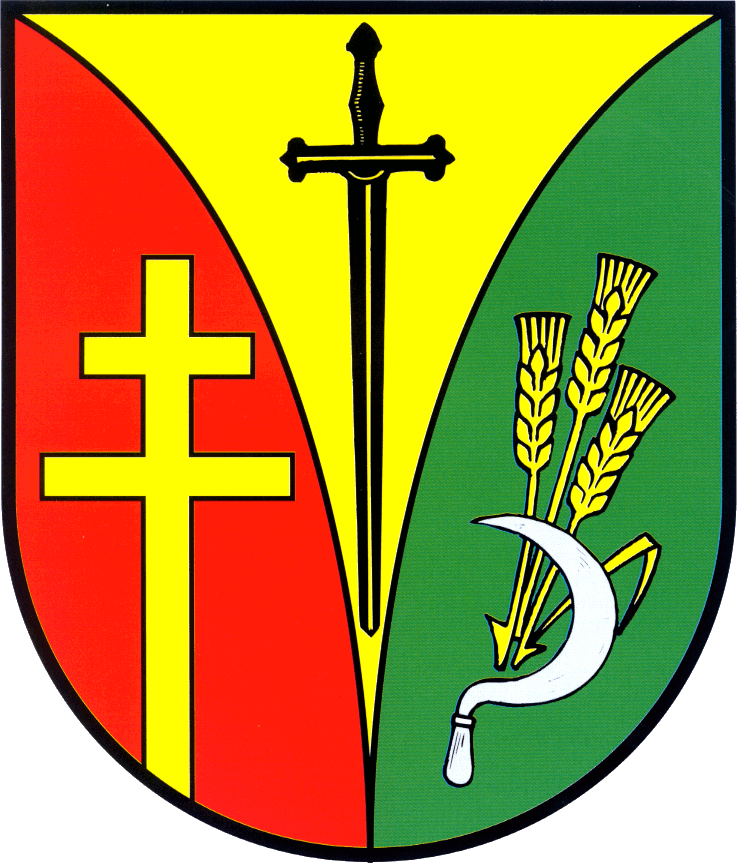
- Coat of arms

- Location of Urschmitt within Cochem-Zell district
- Interactive map of Urschmitt
- Location within Germany Location within Rhineland-Palatinate
- Coordinates: 50°7′07″N 7°3′46″E
- Country: Germany
- State: Rhineland-Palatinate
- District: Cochem-Zell
- Municipal assoc.: Ulmen

Government
  - Mayor (2019–24): Peter Jahnen

Area
  - Total: 6.61 km^{2} (2.55 sq mi)
- Elevation: 390 m (1,280 ft)

Population (2025-12-31)
  - Total: 203
  - Density: 30.7/km^{2} (79.5/sq mi)
- Time zone: UTC+01:00 (CET)
  - Summer (DST): UTC+02:00 (CEST)
- Postal codes: 56825
- Dialling codes: 02677
- Vehicle registration: COC
- Website: www.urschmitt.de

Urschmitt is an Ortsgemeinde – a municipality belonging to a Verbandsgemeinde, a kind of collective municipality – in the Cochem-Zell district in Rhineland-Palatinate, Germany. It belongs to the Verbandsgemeinde of Ulmen, whose seat is in the like-named town.

== Geography ==
The municipality lies in the Eifel about 5 km northwest of Bremm on the river Moselle.

== History ==
In 980, Urschmitt had its first documentary mention under the name Ursmadia. Electoral-Trier overlordship came to an end when the French occupied the Rhine’s left bank between 1794 and 1796. In 1815 Urschmitt was assigned to the Kingdom of Prussia at the Congress of Vienna. Urschmitt and Kliding, which had formed a single municipality, were split into two in 1848. Since 1946, it has been part of the then newly founded state of Rhineland-Palatinate.

== Politics ==
=== Municipal council ===
The council is made up of 6 council members, who were elected by majority vote at the municipal election held on 7 June 2009, and the honorary mayor as chairman.

=== Mayor ===
Urschmitt's mayor is Peter Jahnen, and his deputy is Walter Sossong.

=== Coat of arms ===
The municipality's arms might be described thus: Tierced in mantle reversed, dexter gules issuant from base a cross patriarchal Or, in chief Or a broadsword palewise sable, the point to base, and sinister vert three ears of wheat bendwise sinister of the second surmounted in base by a sickle argent.

== Culture and sightseeing ==
=== Buildings ===
The following are listed buildings or sites in Rhineland-Palatinate’s Directory of Cultural Monuments:

- Saint Quentin’s Catholic Parish Church (Pfarrkirche St. Quintin), Dorfstraße 3 – Late Romanesque tower, two-level Gothic Revival pseudobasilica, 1908, architects Adam Rüppel, Bonn, and Josef Moritz, Müden
- Dorfstraße 5 – timber-frame house, partly solid, hipped mansard roof, 18th century
- In der Haag – Heiligenhäuschen (a small, shrinelike structure consecrated to a saint or saints); inside, wayside cross with Crucifixion group and relief of the Descent from the Cross, 18th century
- Going towards Kliding – Bildstock; Gothic Revival Madonna with Child, 19th or 20th century

== Famous people ==
- Herbert Schneiders (b. 1953), politician
