= Kliding =

- Municipality
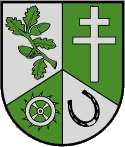
- Coat of arms

- Location of Kliding within Cochem-Zell district
- Interactive map of Kliding
- Location within Germany Location within Rhineland-Palatinate
- Coordinates: 50°6′31″N 7°3′20″E
- Country: Germany
- State: Rhineland-Palatinate
- District: Cochem-Zell
- Municipal assoc.: Ulmen

Government
  - Mayor (2019–24): Gerhard Müller

Area
  - Total: 5.27 km^{2} (2.03 sq mi)
- Elevation: 415 m (1,362 ft)

Population (2025-12-31)
  - Total: 222
  - Density: 42.1/km^{2} (109/sq mi)
- Time zone: UTC+01:00 (CET)
  - Summer (DST): UTC+02:00 (CEST)
- Postal codes: 56825
- Dialling codes: 02677
- Vehicle registration: COC
- Website: www.kliding.de

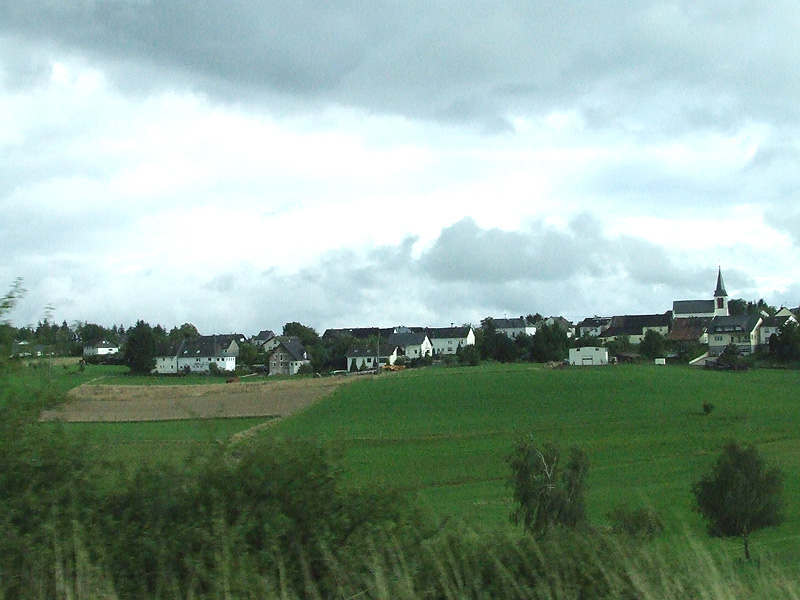
View of Kliding

Kliding is an Ortsgemeinde – a municipality belonging to a Verbandsgemeinde, a kind of collective municipality – in the Cochem-Zell district in Rhineland-Palatinate, Germany. It belongs to the Verbandsgemeinde of Ulmen, whose seat is in the like-named town.

== Geography ==
=== Location ===
The municipality lies in the Eifel, 7 km from the river Moselle.

=== Climate ===
Yearly precipitation in Kliding amounts to 768 mm, which falls into the middle third of the precipitation chart for all Germany. At 56% of the German Weather Service’s weather stations, lower figures are recorded. The driest month is April. The most rainfall comes in June. In that month, precipitation is 1.5 times what it is in April. Precipitation varies only slightly. Only at 1% of the weather stations are even lower seasonal swings recorded.

== History ==
In 1360, Kliding had its first documentary mention as a fief held by the widow of Dietrich, Lord at Ulmen. Electoral-Trier overlordship ended with the French Revolutionary occupation of the Rhine’s left bank between 1794 and 1796. In 1815 Kliding was assigned to the Kingdom of Prussia at the Congress of Vienna. Urschmitt and Kliding, which together formed a single municipality, were split into two separate ones in 1848. In 1869, the consecration of a new chapel at Kliding was celebrated. Since 1946, Kliding has been part of the then newly founded state of Rhineland-Palatinate.

== Politics ==
=== Municipal council ===
The council is made up of 6 council members, who were elected by majority vote at the municipal election held on 7 June 2009, and the honorary mayor as chairman.

=== Mayor ===
Kliding’s mayor is Gerhard Müller.

=== Coat of arms ===
The municipality’s arms might be described thus: Per pale and chevron, argent and vert counterchanged, in dexter chief an oak sprig bendwise slipped fructed of two and leafed of four of the second, in sinister chief a cross patriarchal of the first, in dexter base a waterwheel spoked of four of the second, in sinister base a horseshoe bendwise, the ends to chief, sable.

== Culture and sightseeing ==
=== Buildings ===
The following are listed buildings or sites in Rhineland-Palatinate’s Directory of Cultural Monuments:

- Saint Wendelin’s Catholic Church (Kirche St. Wendelin), Oberdorfstraße 1 – Gothic Revival aisleless church, 1861–1862, building inspector Ferdinand Nebel, west tower 1904

Saint Wendelin’s is also noted for its windows. Kliding is also home to a Heiligenhäuschen (a small, shrinelike structure consecrated to a saint or saints) known as the Dreifaltigkeitsheiligenhäuschen (“Trinity Heiligenhäuschen”), which stands on Mühlweg.

=== Natural monuments ===
- Waterfall (also called the Schießlay; the Eifel’s highest waterfall, with a drop of 28 m)
