= Weiler, Cochem-Zell =

Weiler
- Municipality
- Coat of arms

- Location of Weiler within Cochem-Zell district
- Interactive map of Weiler
- Location within Germany Location within Rhineland-Palatinate
- Coordinates: 50°8′27″N 7°4′33″E
- Country: Germany
- State: Rhineland-Palatinate
- District: Cochem-Zell
- Municipal assoc.: Ulmen

Government
  - Mayor (2019–24): Otto Schneiders

Area
  - Total: 7.33 km^{2} (2.83 sq mi)
- Elevation: 390 m (1,280 ft)

Population (2025-12-31)
  - Total: 262
  - Density: 35.7/km^{2} (92.6/sq mi)
- Time zone: UTC+01:00 (CET)
  - Summer (DST): UTC+02:00 (CEST)
- Postal codes: 56825
- Dialling codes: 02678
- Vehicle registration: COC
- Website: www.weiler-vordereifel.de

Weiler (German pronunciation: [ˈvaɪlɐ]) is an Ortsgemeinde – a municipality belonging to a Verbandsgemeinde, a kind of collective municipality – in the Cochem-Zell district in Rhineland-Palatinate, Germany. It belongs to the Verbandsgemeinde of Ulmen, whose seat is in the like-named town. Weiler is also a recognized tourism municipality (Fremdenverkehrsgemeinde).

== Geography ==
Weiler lies in the Vordereifel (“Further Eifel” – not to be confused with the Verbandsgemeinde of Vordereifel, which is in the Mayen-Koblenz district), at an elevation of 390 m above sea level.

== History ==
As shown by its name, Weiler was founded in the time of the Merovingian expansion in the 7th and 8th centuries. According to documents from 1017 to 1047, Saint Mary’s Church (Marienkirche) in Trier had holdings in Weiler. The place was also mentioned in endowment documents from 1051 and 1056 from Polish queen Richeza, Count Palatine Ezzo’s daughter, to the Brauweiler Monastery near Cologne in connection with her holding in Klotten.

About 1100, Saint Castor’s Foundation in Karden owned land around Weiler. In 1103, the Ravengiersburg Monastery acquired from Saint Stephen’s Foundation (Stift St. Stephan) in Mainz, among other things, holdings in Weiler.

In 1247, the Lonnig Monastery traded holdings in the surrounding countryside with Himmerod Abbey. It is believed that the Electorate of Trier was enfeoffed with Weiler along with Cochem in 1294. The high court jurisdiction was disputed between the town court of Cochem and the high court in Lutzerath for centuries.

Saint Martin’s status as church patron points to an early establishment of a church.

In the Thirty Years' War, the whole village was burnt down. Left standing was the east tower of a Romanesque church, onto which a simple nave was built in 1765.

With the occupation of the Rhine’s left bank by French Revolutionary troops in 1794, the Electorate of Trier, for centuries the local overlord, fell. In 1815 Weiler was assigned to the Kingdom of Prussia at the Congress of Vienna. Since 1946, it has been part of the then newly founded state of Rhineland-Palatinate.

== Politics ==
=== Municipal council ===
The council is made up of 8 council members, who were elected by majority vote at the municipal election held on 7 June 2009, and the honorary mayor as chairman.

=== Mayor ===
Weiler’s mayor is Otto Schneiders, and his deputy is Lothar Berenz.

=== Coat of arms ===
The German blazon reads: In Grün zwei gekreuzte goldene Bischofsstäbe, recht traditionell, links modern mit als Ring ausgeführter, darin drei mit der Krümme verbundene kleine Ringe, unten eine silberne Urne, umrahmt von silbernen Steinen eines Hügelgrabes in Vorderansicht

The municipality’s arms might in English heraldic language be described thus: Vert issuant from base dexter and sinister two bishop’s staffs per saltire, the one in bend sinister traditional and the one in bend modern with a ring-shaped crook containing three annulets, each joined to the crook by a curved spoke, all Or, and issuant from base an arch of stones as of a barrow affronty, within which an urn, all argent.

The traditional bishop’s staff refers to Martin of Tours, the parish patron. In 307, both the clergy and the people chose him as Bishop of Tours. He died on 8 November 371. His status as church patron points to the establishment of a church before the year 1000.

The modern bishop’s staff refers to Dr. Bernhard Stein, born on 5 September 1904 in Weiler, who became the Diocesan Bishop of Trier. He died on 20 February 1993 at the age of 89 as Bishop Emeritus of Trier.

The urn refers to the barrows from prehistory and early history found in Weiler.

== Culture and sightseeing ==
=== Buildings ===
The following are listed buildings or sites in Rhineland-Palatinate’s Directory of Cultural Monuments:

- Saint Martin’s Catholic Church (branch church; Filialkirche St. Martin), Kirchstraße 15 – Romanesque east tower, aisleless church, 1765; graveyard: sandstone cross, marked 1843; cast-iron graveyard gate; warriors’ memorial, stele with relief; whole complex with church and graveyard
- North of the village on Landesstraße (State Road) 16 – wayside chapel, 19th century

=== Natural monuments ===
- 300-year-old limetree (“Manna Esch”)
