= Schmitt, Germany =

Schmitt
- Municipality
- Coat of arms

- Location of Schmitt within Cochem-Zell district
- Interactive map of Schmitt
- Location within Germany Location within Rhineland-Palatinate
- Coordinates: 50°10′0″N 7°0′54″E
- Country: Germany
- State: Rhineland-Palatinate
- District: Cochem-Zell
- Municipal assoc.: Ulmen

Government
  - Mayor (2019–24): Wilfried Linden

Area
  - Total: 2.71 km^{2} (1.05 sq mi)
- Elevation: 420 m (1,380 ft)

Population (2025-12-31)
  - Total: 117
  - Density: 43.2/km^{2} (112/sq mi)
- Time zone: UTC+01:00 (CET)
  - Summer (DST): UTC+02:00 (CEST)
- Postal codes: 56825
- Dialling codes: 02677
- Vehicle registration: COC

Schmitt is an Ortsgemeinde – a municipality belonging to a Verbandsgemeinde, a kind of collective municipality – in the Cochem-Zell district in Rhineland-Palatinate, Germany. It belongs to the Verbandsgemeinde of Ulmen, whose seat is in the like-named town.

== Geography ==
The municipality lies in the southern Eifel, roughly 1.5 km southwest of Alflen and 8 km northwest of the river Moselle at Bremm.

== History ==
The placename Schmitt comes from the German word Schmied, which means the same as – and is cognate with – the English word “smith”. Before the mid 18th century, the southern Eifel was an iron ore production centre of Europe-wide importance. The rivers and streams were harnessed to work the smiths’ bellows, and the forests afforded the needed firewood.

Beginning in 1794, Schmitt lay under French rule. In 1815 it was assigned to the Kingdom of Prussia at the Congress of Vienna. Since 1946, it has been part of the then newly founded state of Rhineland-Palatinate.

== Politics ==
=== Municipal council ===
The council is made up of 6 council members, who were elected by majority vote at the municipal election held on 7 June 2009, and the honorary mayor as chairman.

=== Mayor ===
Schmitt's mayor is Wilfried Linden, and his deputy is Andreas Peifer.

=== Coat of arms ===
The municipality's arms might be described thus: A pale Or charged with a broadsword palewise sable, the hilt to the chief, between vert an oak sprig slipped bendwise sinister leafed of four and fructed of two of the first, and gules three ears of wheat surmounted in base by a sickle of the first.

== Culture and sightseeing ==
=== Buildings ===
The following are listed buildings or sites in Rhineland-Palatinate’s Directory of Cultural Monuments:

- Saint Maurice’s Catholic Church (branch church; Filialkirche St. Mauritius), Kirchstraße 15 – east tower, 13th century; aisleless church, late 16th century, alterations from early 18th century
