= Lutzerath =

- Municipality
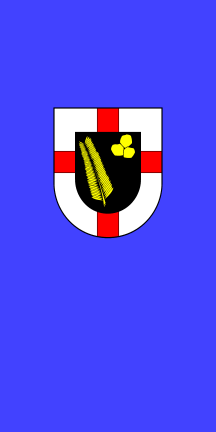
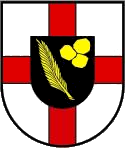
- Flag Coat of arms

- Location of Lutzerath within Cochem-Zell district
- Interactive map of Lutzerath
- Location within Germany Location within Rhineland-Palatinate
- Coordinates: 50°7′41″N 7°0′15″E
- Country: Germany
- State: Rhineland-Palatinate
- District: Cochem-Zell
- Municipal assoc.: Ulmen

Government
  - Mayor (2019–24): Günter Welter

Area
  - Total: 23.7 km^{2} (9.2 sq mi)
- Elevation: 419 m (1,375 ft)

Population (2025-12-31)
  - Total: 1,539
  - Density: 64.9/km^{2} (168/sq mi)
- Time zone: UTC+01:00 (CET)
  - Summer (DST): UTC+02:00 (CEST)
- Postal codes: 56826
- Dialling codes: 02677
- Vehicle registration: COC
- Website: www.lutzerath.de

Lutzerath (German pronunciation: [ˈlʊtsəʁaːt]) is an Ortsgemeinde (a municipality belonging to a Verbandsgemeinde), a kind of collective municipality – in the Cochem-Zell district in Rhineland-Palatinate, Germany. It belongs to the Verbandsgemeinde of Ulmen, whose administrative center is in the town of Ulmen. Lutzerath is a recognized recreational resort (Erholungsort).

== Geography ==
=== Location ===
Lutzerath lies in the Vulkaneifel, a part of the Eifel known for its volcanic history, geographical and geological features. Ongoing activities today, include gas emissions from the earth. Although part of the Vulkaneifel region, it does not fall within the district of the same name. Lutzerath is found on a high ridge (435 m above sea level) framed by dales, woods and meadows, between the state spa of Bad Bertrich and the tourist resort of Daun. Nearby are some crater lakes.

=== Constituent communities ===
Besides the main centre, also called Lutzerath, there is an outlying centre called Driesch.

Alongside Driesch, there are residential areas that also belong to Lutzerath: Jagdhaus Flöder, Auf der Acht, Altmühle, Neumühle, Waldhaus Lutzerath and Waldhof.

== History ==
Lutzerath had its first documented mention in 1051, and was long an Electoral-Trier holding. In 1726, a main post office with a horse-changing station was built in Lutzerath. With the French Revolutionary occupation of the lands on the Rhine’s left bank between 1794 and 1796, Lutzerath passed to the canton of Lutzerath. In 1815, it was assigned to the Kingdom of Prussia at the Congress of Vienna. Since 1946, it has been part of the then newly founded state of Rhineland-Palatinate.

The outlying centre of Driesch was originally part of Lutzerath but became a separate municipality in 1922. On 7 June 1969, it was reincorporated into Lutzerath.

== Politics ==
=== Municipal council ===
The council is made up of 16 council members, who were elected by proportional representation at the municipal election held on 7 June 2009, and the honorary mayor as chairman.

The municipal election held on 7 June 2009 yielded the following results:

| Year | CDU | UWG | Total |
|---|---|---|---|
| 2009 | 9 | 7 | 16 seats |
| 2004 | 9 | 7 | 16 seats |

=== Mayor ===
Lutzerath's mayor is Günter Welter, and his deputies are Roswitha Lescher, Werner Trasser and Hermann-Josef Kesseler.

=== Coat of arms ===
The municipality’s arms might be described thus: Argent a cross gules surmounted by an inescutcheon sable charged with a palm leaf bendwise slipped and in sinister chief three stones Or.

=== Town partnerships ===
Lutzerath fosters partnerships with the following places:

- Givry-en-Argonne, Marne, France since 1981

== Culture and sightseeing ==
=== Buildings ===
The following are listed buildings or sites in Rhineland-Palatinate’s Directory of Cultural Monuments:

==== Lutzerath (main centre) ====
- Saint Stephen’s Catholic Parish Church (Pfarrkirche St. Stephan), Kirchstraße – aisleless church, 1773-1775; three-floor west tower, marked 1818, building inspector Maeler, expansion 1962; outside: missionary cross, Crucifixion group, 1869
- Jewish graveyard (monumental zone) – 11 grave steles from 1689 to 1942
- Dauner Straße 20 – Quereinhaus (a combination residential and commercial house divided for these two purposes down the middle, perpendicularly to the street), earlier half of the 19th century
- Graveyard – sandstone grave cross, 18th century; gravestone, 19th century; graveyard cross, 19th or 20th century; Gothic Revival gravestone, 1854
- Trierer Straße 22/24 – three-floor, twelve-axis solid building, marked 1835
- Trierer Straße 23 – former estate complex along the street; timber-frame house, 19th century
- Trierer Straße 34 – former rectory; solid building, 1848
- Trierer Straße 36 – former school; plastered building, mid 19th century
- On the way out of the village, on Landesstraße (State Road) 103 going towards Bad Bertrich – wayside chapel; Gothic Revival chapel, crow-stepped gable, earlier half of the 19th century; retable dating from time of building
- On Landesstraße 103, south of Lutzerath – open wayside chapel, Bildstock, 18th century
- On Landesstraße 52 going towards Strotzbüsch – sandstone wayside cross, marked 1819

==== Driesch ====
- Rudolf-Schneiders-Straße – Mater Dolorosa Catholic Pilgrimage Church (Wallfahrtskirche Mater Dolorosa) – twin-naved hall church, 1478-1496, Late Gothic tower roof and Gothic nave roof destroyed in 1687, built anew in 1691, west portal 1868; outside circuit path, 1755, with Stations of the Cross, 1757, Johann Heinrich Nilles, Wittlich; whole complex with church and circuit path
- Rudolf-Schneider-Straße 2 – timber-frame house, partly solid or slated, marked 1787
- Unterdorfstraße – three basalt fountain basins

=== Other points of interest ===
- Achterhöhe lookout point
- Ice age caves on the Falkenlay

== Economy and infrastructure ==
The municipality is characterized by agriculture, tourism and trade. As the main centre in the surrounding area, Lutzerath has many infrastructural institutions.
