= Clutch stations =

After the Cold War had begun, four clutch stations (military airbases) were built in North Rhine-Westphalia, then Western Germany, for the Royal Air Force (RAF):

- RAF Wildenrath operated from January 1952 to 1992
- RAF Geilenkirchen (opened in May 1953)
- RAF Brüggen (opened in July 1953)
- RAF Laarbruch (operated October 1954 - 1999) (Note: Since 2003, RAF Laarbruch has been Weeze Airport, a minor international airport.)

Nörvenich Air Base (opened in 1954) was built for the RAF Second Tactical Air Force (since 1 January 1959 called Royal Air Force Germany).

RAF Wildenrath, RAF Brüggen, and RAF Laarbruch came under the auspices of NATO's Second Allied Tactical Air Force (2ATAF).

All five stations were physically close to each other and were built close to the Germany–Netherlands border. Until the German reunification in 1990 and the Dissolution of the Eastern Bloc, the Inner German border was also the border between Eastern Bloc (dominated by the Soviet Union) and the Western World / NATO.

In case of an eastern attack, the western Interceptor aircraft would have needed some minutes to start; therefore a large distance between all Western Allied Air bases and the inner German border was important.

== See also ==
- Büchel Air Base (a military air base of the Luftwaffe in Büchel, near the city of Cochem
- Spangdahlem Air Base (about 70 km from Büchel)
