= Wagenhausen, Rhineland-Palatinate =

Wagenhausen
- Municipality
- Coat of arms

- Location of Wagenhausen within Cochem-Zell district
- Interactive map of Wagenhausen
- Location within Germany Location within Rhineland-Palatinate
- Coordinates: 50°8′40″N 6°59′11″E
- Country: Germany
- State: Rhineland-Palatinate
- District: Cochem-Zell
- Municipal assoc.: Ulmen

Government
  - Mayor (2019–24): Heinz-Werner Hendges

Area
  - Total: 1.8 km^{2} (0.69 sq mi)
- Elevation: 360 m (1,180 ft)

Population (2025-12-31)
  - Total: 65
  - Density: 36/km^{2} (94/sq mi)
- Time zone: UTC+01:00 (CET)
  - Summer (DST): UTC+02:00 (CEST)
- Postal codes: 56826
- Dialling codes: 02677
- Vehicle registration: COC
- Website: www.wagenhausen.de

Wagenhausen (German pronunciation: [vaːɡn̩ˈhaʊzn̩]) is an Ortsgemeinde – a municipality belonging to a Verbandsgemeinde, a kind of collective municipality – in the Cochem-Zell district in Rhineland-Palatinate, Germany. It belongs to the Verbandsgemeinde of Ulmen, whose seat is in the like-named town. Wagenhausen is the smallest municipality in the Eifel.

== Geography ==
The municipality lies in the Eifel, about 1.5 km south of Wollmerath.

== History ==
With the occupation of the Rhine’s left bank by French Revolutionary troops in 1794, the Electorate of Trier, for centuries the local overlord, fell. In 1815 Wagenhausen was assigned to the Kingdom of Prussia at the Congress of Vienna. Since 1946, it has been part of the then newly founded state of Rhineland-Palatinate.

== Politics ==
=== Municipal council ===
The council is made up of 6 council members, who were elected by majority vote at the municipal election held on 7 June 2009, and the honorary mayor as chairman.

=== Coat of arms ===
The municipality's arms might be described thus: Vert issuant from base two ears of rye, one bendwise, the other bendwise sinister, crossing each other per saltire in chief Or, between which a waterwheel spoked of seven argent, in base a sinister hand in fess dorsed proper holding two candles per saltire of the second.

== Culture and sightseeing ==
=== Buildings ===
The following are listed buildings or sites in Rhineland-Palatinate’s Directory of Cultural Monuments:

- Saint Blaise’s Catholic Chapel (Kapelle St. Blasius) – Baroque aisleless church, marked 1720
- Ringstraße – fire station with fountain; quarrystone building, 19th century
- On the way out of the village – Bildstock, newly plastered
