= Büchel, Rhineland-Palatinate =

Büchel
- Municipality
- Coat of arms

- Location of Büchel within Cochem-Zell district
- Interactive map of Büchel
- Location within Germany Location within Rhineland-Palatinate
- Coordinates: 50°10′27″N 7°5′1″E
- Country: Germany
- State: Rhineland-Palatinate
- District: Cochem-Zell
- Municipal assoc.: Ulmen

Government
  - Mayor (2019–24): Timo Pfitzner

Area
  - Total: 12.84 km^{2} (4.96 sq mi)
- Elevation: 450 m (1,480 ft)

Population (2025-12-31)
  - Total: 1,235
  - Density: 96.18/km^{2} (249.1/sq mi)
- Time zone: UTC+01:00 (CET)
  - Summer (DST): UTC+02:00 (CEST)
- Postal codes: 56823
- Dialling codes: 02678
- Vehicle registration: COC
- Website: www.buechel.de

Büchel (German pronunciation: [ˈbyːçl̩]) is an Ortsgemeinde – a municipality belonging to a Verbandsgemeinde, a kind of collective municipality – in the Cochem-Zell district in Rhineland-Palatinate, Germany. It belongs to the Verbandsgemeinde of Ulmen, whose seat is in the like-named town.

== Geography ==
=== Location ===
The municipality lies in the heart of the Eifel.

=== Climate ===
Yearly precipitation in Büchel amounts to 877 mm, which is rather high, falling into the highest fourth of the precipitation chart for all Germany. At 75% of the German Weather Service's weather stations, lower figures are recorded. The driest month is September. The most rainfall comes in November. In that month, precipitation is 1.7 times what it is in September. Precipitation varies moderately. At 62% of the weather stations, lower seasonal swings are recorded.

== History ==
In 1141, the Martental, which lay within the bounds of what is now Büchel, had its first documentary mention as a monastery. About 1238, an estate at Morschweiler was mentioned. in 1476, the Alflen (including Georgweiler and Morschweiler) high court's bench fell under Electoral-Trier sovereignty. In 1794 came the occupation by French Revolutionary troops. In 1815 Büchel was assigned to the Kingdom of Prussia at the Congress of Vienna. In 1873, Büchel became a parish, with the outlying centres of Georgweiler and Morschweiler belonging to the municipality. Since 1946, it has been part of the then newly founded state of Rhineland-Palatinate.

=== Religion ===
In 2007, 84.9% of the inhabitants were Catholic and 5.3% Evangelical. The rest belonged to other faiths or adhered to none.

== Politics ==
=== Municipal council ===
The council is made up of 16 council members, who were elected by majority vote at the municipal election held on 7 June 2009, and the honorary mayor as chairman.

=== Mayor ===
Büchel's mayor is Timo Pfitzner.

=== Coat of arms ===
The German blazon reads: Durch eine eingeschweifte Spitze bis zum Schildhaupt, darin in Silber sieben schwarze Kreuzchen, gespalten; vorne in Grün ein silberner Turm wachsend; hinten in Rot ein silbernes Säulenkreuz mit aus dem Rand wachsendem Sockel.

The municipality's arms might in English heraldic language be described thus: Tierced in mantle, dexter vert issuant from the line of partition a tower argent, sinister gules issuant from the line of partition a post ensigned with a cross Maltese of the second, in base argent seven crosses, one, three, two and one sable.

The seven crosses in the base stood as children's prayer and supplication places when they were visited for the village's seriously ill. The first cross still stands in the centre of Georgsweiler at the gable wall of Matthias Braun's house on Lindenstraße. It was the children's starting point on their way to prayers at the seven crosses. This first cross likewise stands as the memorial site to the former Georgsweiler Vikarkirche (“curatic church”), whose ruins were removed in 1886. The other six crosses are also still preserved today and are found on Georgsweilerstraße and Alfler Weg, and in the traditional cadastral area known as Sauwasem. The silver tower on the green field stands for agriculture and the former windmill. In 1840, the tower was converted into a windmill. In 1923, Wilhelm Hay acquired the windmill, whereupon it was converted into a dwelling. The tall, silver cross on the red field refers to Saint Maurice’s Chapel (Mauritiuskapelle) in the centre of Morschweiler, which was still being named in documents in 1777. In the time of French occupation (1794–1815), it fell into disrepair. On the spot in Morschweiler where the chapel once stood, a stone cross was first raised by Pastor Bernhard Steinmetz on 8 December 1913. The core of today's village is formed by the two centres of Georgweiler and Morschweiler, which might have had their beginnings in the time of the Merovingian expansion. Each of the two parts of the village had its own church or chapel, which were consecrated to Saint George and Saint Maurice respectively.

== Culture and sightseeing ==
=== Buildings ===
The following are listed buildings or sites in Rhineland-Palatinate’s Directory of Cultural Monuments:

- Saint Simon's and Saint Judas's Catholic Parish Church (Pfarrkirche St. Simon und Judas), Hauptstraße 16 – tower 1862-1863 by building inspector F. Nebel, Koblenz; nave 1957; outside: stele with Saint Barbara, 18th century
- At Lindenstraße 6 – wooden votive cross from 1824; boundary stone

=== Sport and leisure ===
The village has one gymnasium.

== Economy and infrastructure ==
=== Military ===
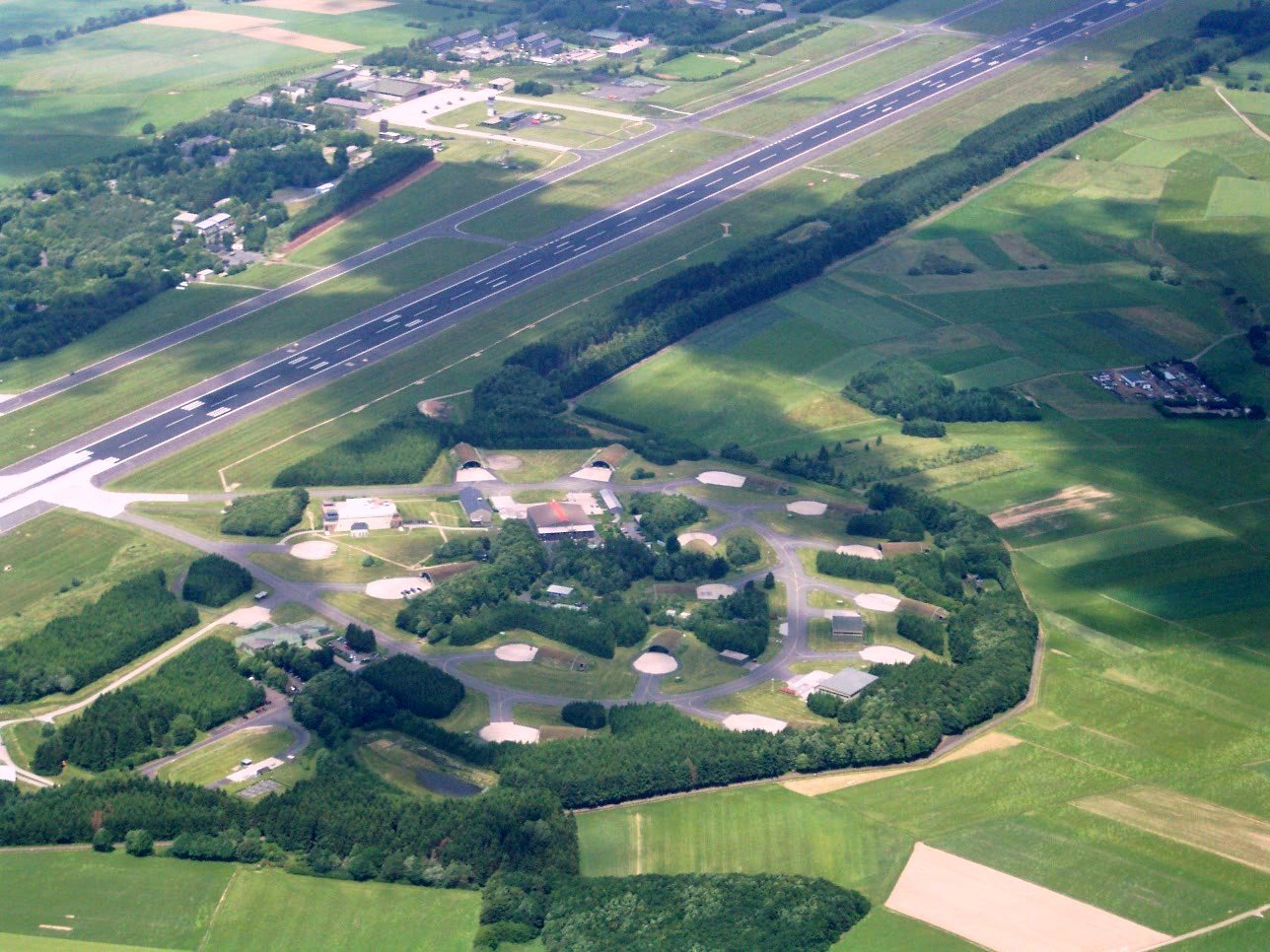
Büchel Air Force Base

Büchel Airbase (Fliegerhorst Büchel) was built west of the village after the Second World War by the French occupational forces, and transferred to the Federal German administration in 1955. The base is home of the Taktisches Luftwaffengeschwader 33 (TaktLwG 33) of the German Air Force (Luftwaffe) and the 702 Munition Support Squadron (702 MUNSS) of the United States Air Force (USAF). Since 1985, the TaktLwG 33 operates Panavia Tornado airplanes, which are capable of delivering the twenty B61 nuclear bombs, which are stored and maintained by the 702 MUNSS of the USAF. Under the NATO nuclear sharing arrangement, these twenty B61 bombs require a dual key system, with the simultaneous authorizations of Germany and the United States, before any action is taken. Since July 2007, the airbase has been the only location in Germany with nuclear weapons.

=== Education ===
The village has one kindergarten and one primary school.

=== Transport ===
Through Büchel runs Bundesstraße 259.
