= Gillenbeuren =

- Municipality
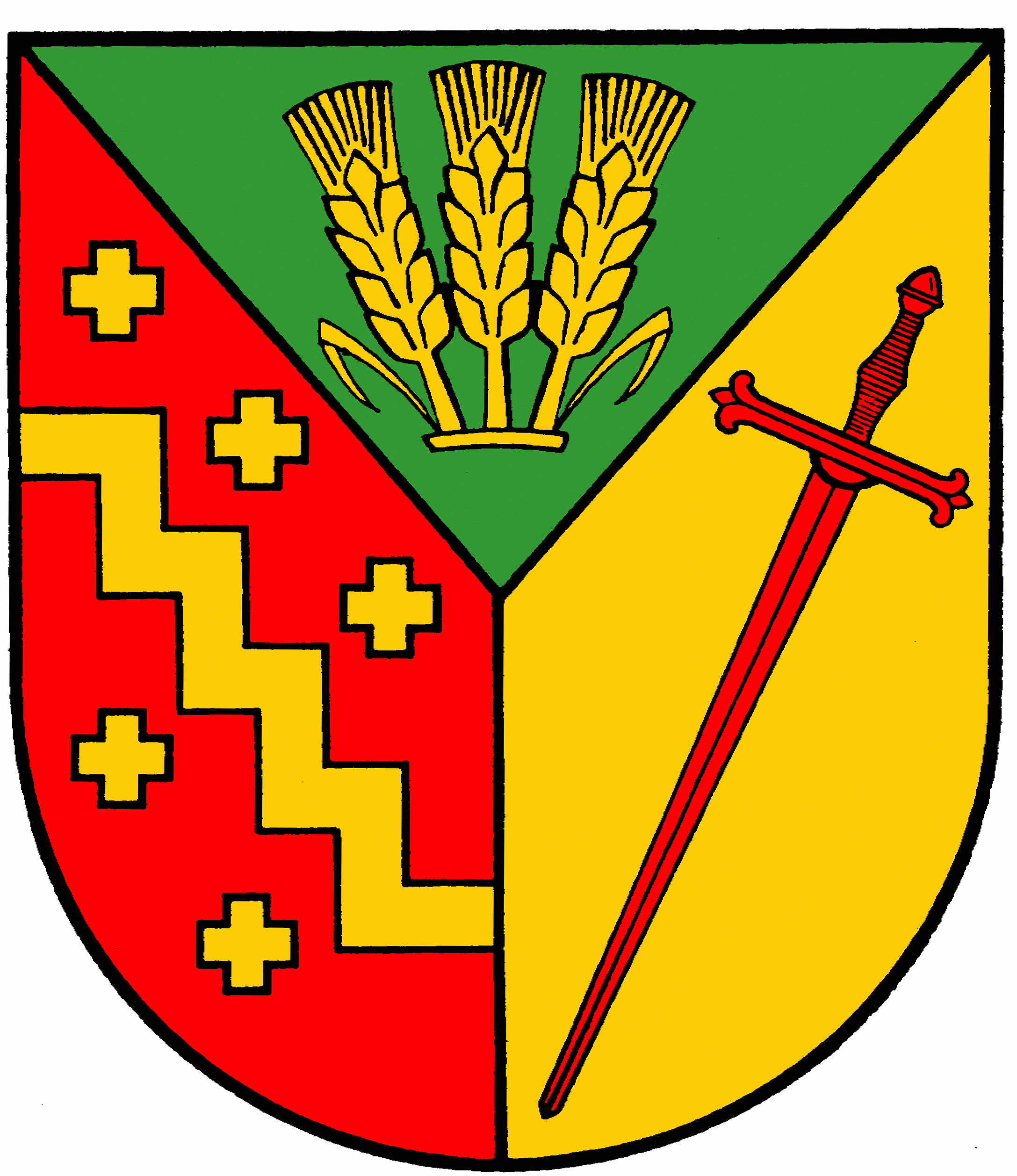
- Coat of arms

- Location of Gillenbeuren within Cochem-Zell district
- Interactive map of Gillenbeuren
- Location within Germany Location within Rhineland-Palatinate
- Coordinates: 50°9′17″N 7°1′6″E
- Country: Germany
- State: Rhineland-Palatinate
- District: Cochem-Zell
- Municipal assoc.: Ulmen

Government
  - Mayor (2019–24): Paul Haubrichs

Area
  - Total: 4.70 km^{2} (1.81 sq mi)
- Elevation: 430 m (1,410 ft)

Population (2025-12-31)
  - Total: 239
  - Density: 50.9/km^{2} (132/sq mi)
- Time zone: UTC+01:00 (CET)
  - Summer (DST): UTC+02:00 (CEST)
- Postal codes: 56825
- Dialling codes: 02677
- Vehicle registration: COC
- Website: www.gillenbeuren.de

Gillenbeuren is an Ortsgemeinde – a municipality belonging to a Verbandsgemeinde, a kind of collective municipality – in the Cochem-Zell district in Rhineland-Palatinate, Germany. It belongs to the Verbandsgemeinde of Ulmen, whose seat is in the like-named town.

== Geography ==
The municipality lies in a dale in the southern Eifel.

== History ==
In 1220, Gillenbeuren had its first documentary mention. At that time, a chapel was built, and the village was called Gildonburun. In the St. Florin Foundation (Koblenz) provost's exchange agreement on 17 March 1250 it is mentioned that the Foundation held the tithing rights to Gillenbeuren, until then held by his chapter. The village was also held by the Count of Manderscheid-Blankenheim as a fief. In 1280, Elisabeth von "Wuninberch" (Winneburg) and her son Wirich sold a year's returns in Gillenbeuren.

Still standing today at the graveyard is an old stone cross, chiselled into which is the name Goelebaevren. In the Taxa generalis subsidorum cleri Trevirensis from about 1330, Gillenbeuren is listed as a parish of the rural chapter of Zell. In 1462, "Johann Herr zu Winnenburg und Beilstein" ("John, Lord at Winnenburg and Beilstein") pledged the village of Gillenbeuren to Count Wilhelm von Blankenheim.

In 1475, the Prince-Archbishop-Elector of Trier besought the Counts Dietrich and Cuno von Manderscheid-Blankenheim, in connection with their feud with the Lords of Winneburg-Beilstein, not to challenge him: the village was to be held by the Margrave of Baden, who was the Prince-Archbishop-Elector's brother, the Provost at the St. Florin Foundation in Koblenz and also, at least in the Prince-Archbishop-Elector's view, the rightful landholder under Electoral-Trier overlordship.

In 1534, Philipp zu Winnenburg und Beilstein's guardians and the parish priest at that time, Peter Krebs from Gillenbeuren, found themselves at odds. The dispute involved a few feudal estates belonging to the St. Florin Foundation, which also drew tithes from Gillenbeuren and had the right to name parish priests.

Saint Martin's status as patron saint has been mentioned since 1552.

The name Gillenbeuren appeared in the 1475 visitation protocols of Archdeacon Heinrich von Finstingen from Karden as well as in the 1552 register with the canons of the St. Florin Foundation at Koblenz. Furthermore, the name Gillenbeuren can be found in the 1592 visitation under Archbishop of Trier Johann VIII von Schönenberg, and also in the Karden Archdeaconate's 1656 report.

In 1833, there was a great fire in Gillenbeuren that left great neediness in its wake. A letter beseeching the then Prussian king, Frederick William III, for help went unanswered.

The village was, until Secularization, under Electoral-Trier overlordship and passed in 1815 to Prussian administration. Since 1946, it has been part of the then newly founded state of Rhineland-Palatinate.

In 1985, Gillenbeuren was the district-level winner in the contest Unser Dorf soll schöner werden ("Our village should become lovelier").

== Politics ==
=== Municipal council ===
The council is made up of 6 council members, who were elected by majority vote at the municipal election held on 7 June 2009, and the honorary mayor as chairman.

=== Mayor ===
Gillenbeuren's mayor is Paul Haubrichs.

=== Coat of arms ===
The German blazon reads: Das Wappen der Ortsgemeinde Gillenbeuren ist ein im Deichselschnittgeteilter Schild. Er beinhaltet oben in Grün drei goldene Ähren, vorne in Rot ein goldener, schrägrechter Stufenbalken, begleitet von oben drei, unten zwei goldenen Kreuzchen, hinten in Gold ein rotes, schräglinkes Schwert.

The municipality's arms might in English heraldic language be described thus: Per pall, dexter gules semée of crosses a bend dancetty Or, sinister Or a sword bendwise sinister of the first, the pommel to chief, in chief vert three ears of wheat of the second.

The charges in this escutcheon refer to the municipality's history. As early as 1462, the Winneburg-Beilstein noble family, whose arms were charged with a bend dancetty (zigzag slanted stripe) on a field strewn with crosses, held the village of Gillenbeuren as a fief, and also the high court jurisdiction. The sword is Saint Martin's attribute, thus representing the church's patron saint. The three ears of wheat refer to the village's beginnings as a feudal estate that was bound to hand its produce over to the feudal lords, and also to agriculture, a pursuit still undertaken in the municipality.

The arms were designed by A. Friderichs of Zell, and have been borne since 21 August 1986.

== Culture and sightseeing ==
=== Buildings ===
The following are listed buildings or sites in Rhineland-Palatinate’s Directory of Cultural Monuments:

- Saint Martin's Catholic Parish Church (Pfarrkirche St. Martin), Kirchstraße 11 – quarrystone aisleless church, Rundbogenstil, 1846/1847; grave crosses, 18th and 19th century
- Hauptstraße/corner of Lindenstraße – Pietà, 18th century
- Kirchstraße 2 – wooden cross, from 1853
- Kirchstraße 3 – estate complex house; building with half-hipped roof, from 1834
- Kirchstraße 7 – rectory, 1789/1790; representative building with hipped mansard roof, bearing year 1829 (conversion)
