= Ulmener Maar =

Lake in Ulmen, Germany

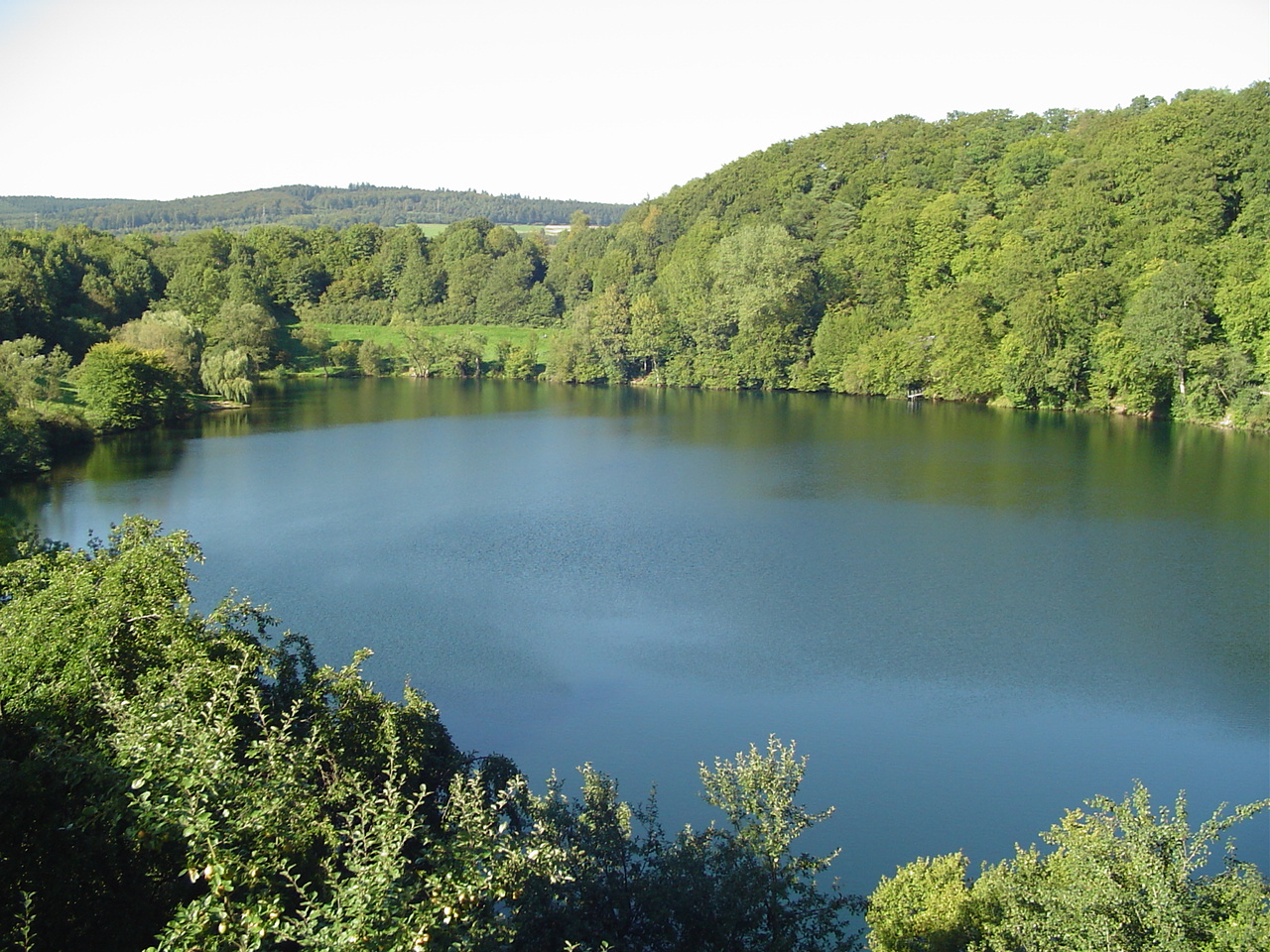
- View looking north from the castle ruins of the upper ward

- Location within Germany
- Coordinates: 50°12′36″N 6°58′59″E
- Primary inflows: Römerstollen (from Jungferweiher), Ulmener Bach (manmade, since 1875)
- Primary outflows: no egress
- Max. length: 0.51 km (0.32 mi)
- Max. width: 0.25 km (0.16 mi)
- Max. depth: 37 m (121 ft)
- Shore length^{1}: 0.9 km (0.56 mi)
- Surface elevation: 440 m (1,440 ft)
- Settlements: Ulmen
- ^{1} Shore length is not a well-defined measure.

The Ulmener Maar is a maar in the Eifel mountains of Germany in the immediate vicinity of the town of Ulmen in the state of Rhineland-Palatinate. The lake is up to 37 metres deep and is surrounded by an embankment of tuff with an average height of 20 metres, which was formed from the erupted material of the former volcano. By the southern edge of the embankment are the ruins of a knight's castle, Ulmen Castle dating to the 11th century.

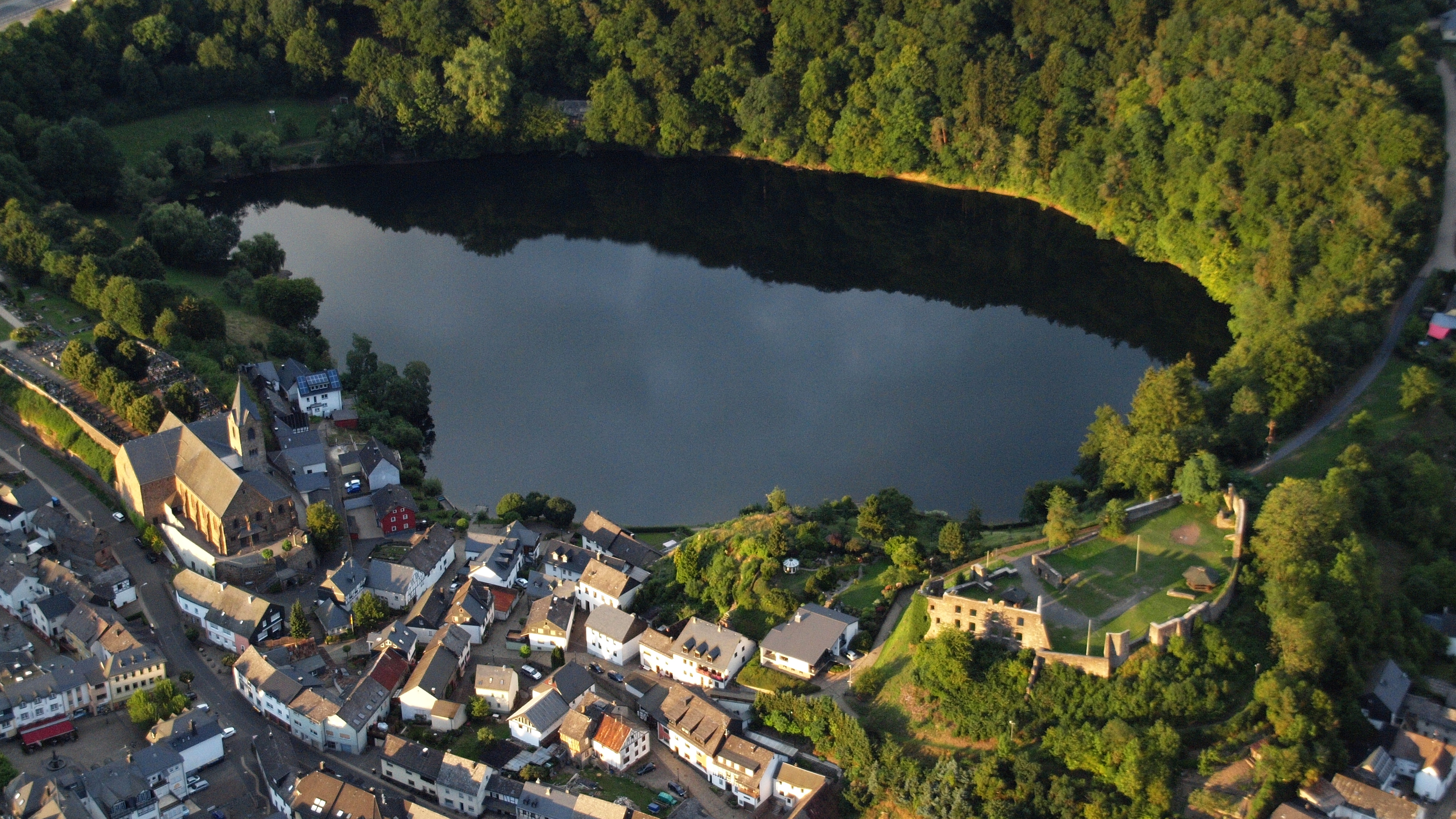
Ulmener Maar, 2015 aerial photograph

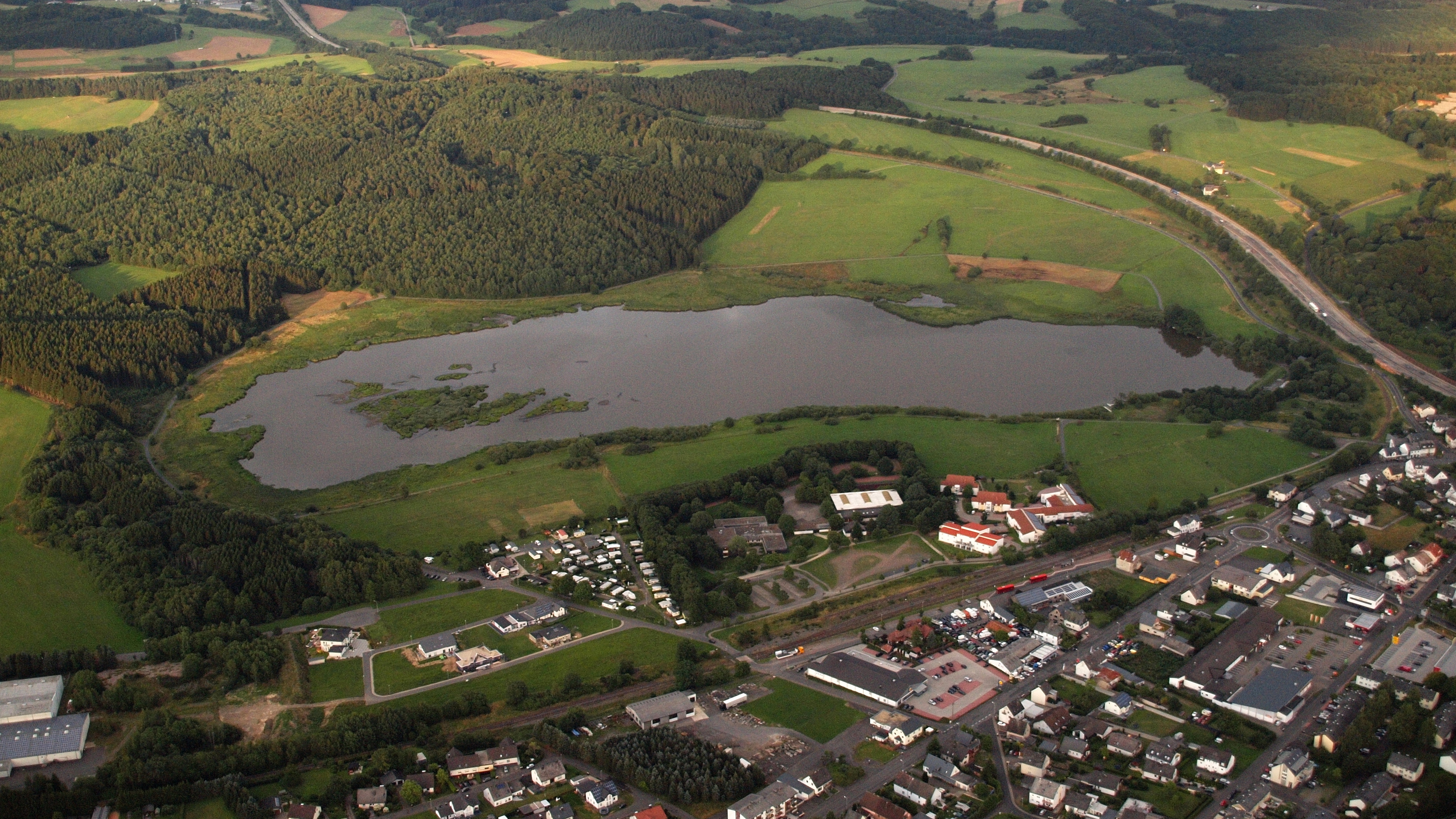
Ulmen, Jungferweiher, 2015 aerial photograph

== IUGS geological heritage site ==
In respect of it being the 'youngest volcano in central Europe, situated in Vulkaneifel, the volcanic region where the model of formation of maars by phreatomagmatic eruptions was established', the International Union of Geological Sciences (IUGS) included 'The Holocene Ulmen Maar' in its assemblage of 100 'geological heritage sites' around the world in a listing published in October 2022. The organisation defines an IUGS Geological Heritage Site as 'a key place with geological elements and/or processes of international scientific relevance, used as a reference, and/or with a substantial contribution to the development of geological sciences through history.'

== See also ==
- List of lakes in Germany
- List of volcanoes in Germany

== Literature ==
- Werner D’hein: Natur- und Kulturführer Vulkanlandeifel. Mit 26 Stationen der „Deutschen Vulkanstraße“. Gaasterland-Verlag, Düsseldorf, 2006, ISBN 3-935873-15-8.
