= Ulmen Castle =

Castle ruins in Ulmen, Germany

Coordinates: 50.2085°N 6.9816°E

Ulmen Castle is a ruined castle complex in Ulmen, Germany.

The upper castle was built on a slope above the Ulmener Maar, while the lower castle was adjacent but below it.
