= Ulmen (Verbandsgemeinde) =

Verbandsgemeinde in Rhineland-Palatinate

- Verbandsgemeinde
- Location of Ulmen within Cochem-Zell district
- Interactive map of Ulmen
- Location within Germany Location within Rhineland-Palatinate
- Coordinates: 50°12′N 6°59′E
- Country: Germany
- State: Rhineland-Palatinate
- District: Cochem-Zell
- Seat: Ulmen
- Subdivisions: 16 municipalities

Area
  - Total: 211.16 km^{2} (81.53 sq mi)

Population (2025-12-31)
  - Total: 11,105
  - Density: 52.590/km^{2} (136.21/sq mi)
- Time zone: UTC+01:00 (CET)
  - Summer (DST): UTC+02:00 (CEST)
- Website: www.ulmen.de

Ulmen is a Verbandsgemeinde ("collective municipality") in the district Cochem-Zell, in Rhineland-Palatinate, Germany. The seat of the Verbandsgemeinde is in Ulmen.

The Verbandsgemeinde Ulmen consists of the following Ortsgemeinden ("local municipalities"):

1. Alflen
2. Auderath
3. Bad Bertrich
4. Beuren
5. Büchel
6. Filz
7. Gevenich
8. Gillenbeuren
9. Kliding
10. Lutzerath
11. Schmitt
12. Ulmen
13. Urschmitt
14. Wagenhausen
15. Weiler
16. Wollmerath
