= Filz =

- Municipality
- Location of Filz within Cochem-Zell district
- Interactive map of Filz
- Location within Germany Location within Rhineland-Palatinate
- Coordinates: 50°10′12″N 6°58′52″E
- Country: Germany
- State: Rhineland-Palatinate
- District: Cochem-Zell
- Municipal assoc.: Ulmen

Government
  - Mayor (2019–24): Helmut Römer

Area
  - Total: 3.11 km^{2} (1.20 sq mi)
- Elevation: 450 m (1,480 ft)

Population (2025-12-31)
  - Total: 80
  - Density: 26/km^{2} (67/sq mi)
- Time zone: UTC+01:00 (CET)
  - Summer (DST): UTC+02:00 (CEST)
- Postal codes: 56766
- Dialling codes: 02677
- Vehicle registration: COC

Filz is an Ortsgemeinde – a municipality belonging to a Verbandsgemeinde, a kind of collective municipality – in the Cochem-Zell district in Rhineland-Palatinate, Germany. It belongs to the Verbandsgemeinde of Ulmen, whose seat is in the like-named town.

== Geography ==
The municipality lies in the South Eifel, south of Ulmen and east of Daun.

== History ==
The municipality's overlord in the Middle Ages was the Electorate of Trier. Beginning in 1794, Filz lay under French rule. In 1815 it was assigned to the Kingdom of Prussia at the Congress of Vienna, becoming part of that kingdom's Rhine Province. Since 1946, it has been part of the then newly founded state of Rhineland-Palatinate.

== Politics ==
=== Municipal council ===
The council is made up of 6 council members, who were elected by majority vote at the municipal election held on 7 June 2009, and the honorary mayor as chairman.

=== Mayor ===
Filz's mayor is Helmut Römer.

=== Coat of arms ===
The municipality's arms might be described thus: Tierced in mantle, dexter azure a sword bendwise sinister, the pommel to chief, argent, sinister gules a bishop's staff bendwise and to dexter a wheel spoked of seven Or, and in base Or an ear of wheat leafed of two vert.

== Culture and sightseeing ==
=== Buildings ===
The following are listed buildings or sites in Rhineland-Palatinate’s Directory of Cultural Monuments:

- Saint Catherine's and Saint Nicholas's Catholic Church (branch church; Filialkirche St. Katharina und Nikolaus), Hauptstraße 25 – aisleless church, about 1730
- Ringstraße 14: estate complex; building with half-hipped roof, from 1849
