= Bad Bertrich =

Place in Rhineland-Palatinate, Germany

- Municipality
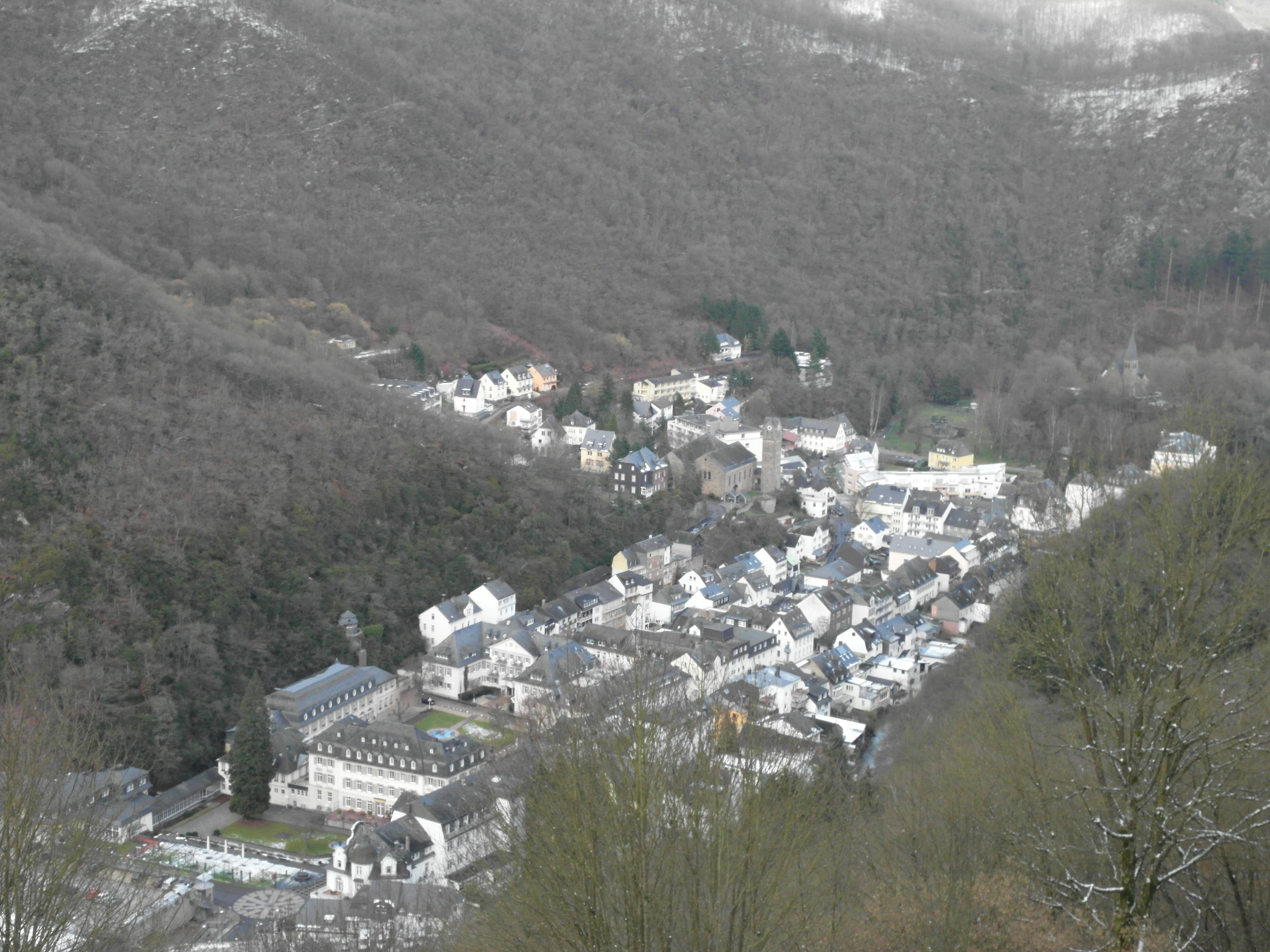
- Bad Bertrich seen from southwest

- Coat of arms

- Location of Bad Bertrich within Cochem-Zell district
- Interactive map of Bad Bertrich
- Location within Germany Location within Rhineland-Palatinate
- Coordinates: 50°4′14.42″N 7°2′6.30″E
- Country: Germany
- State: Rhineland-Palatinate
- District: Cochem-Zell
- Municipal assoc.: Ulmen

Government
  - Mayor (2019–24): Christian Arnold

Area
  - Total: 8.71 km^{2} (3.36 sq mi)
- Elevation: 150 m (490 ft)

Population (2025-12-31)
  - Total: 972
  - Density: 112/km^{2} (289/sq mi)
- Time zone: UTC+01:00 (CET)
  - Summer (DST): UTC+02:00 (CEST)
- Postal codes: 56864
- Dialling codes: 02674
- Vehicle registration: COC
- Website: www.bad-bertrich.de

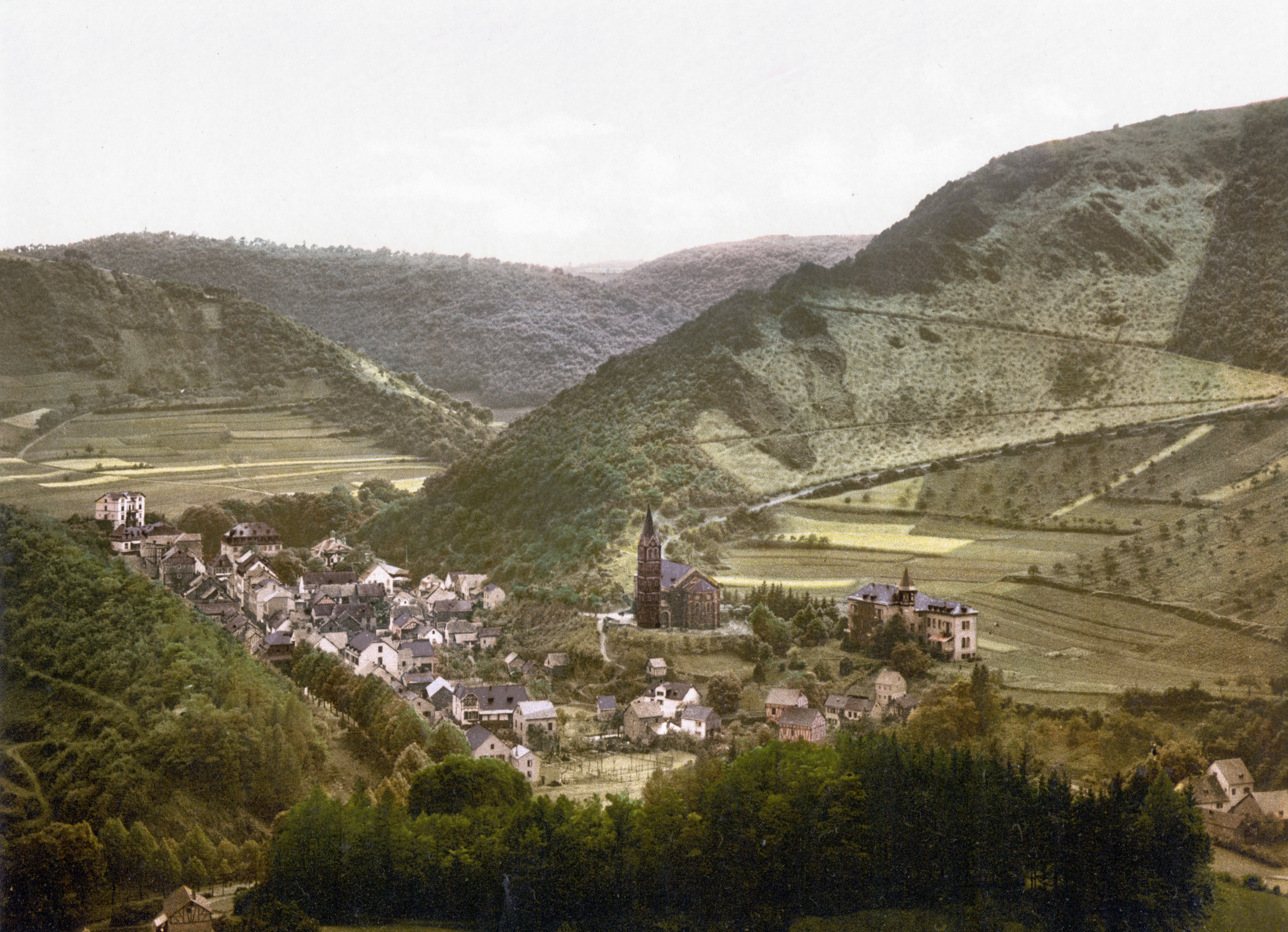
Bad Bertrich about 1900

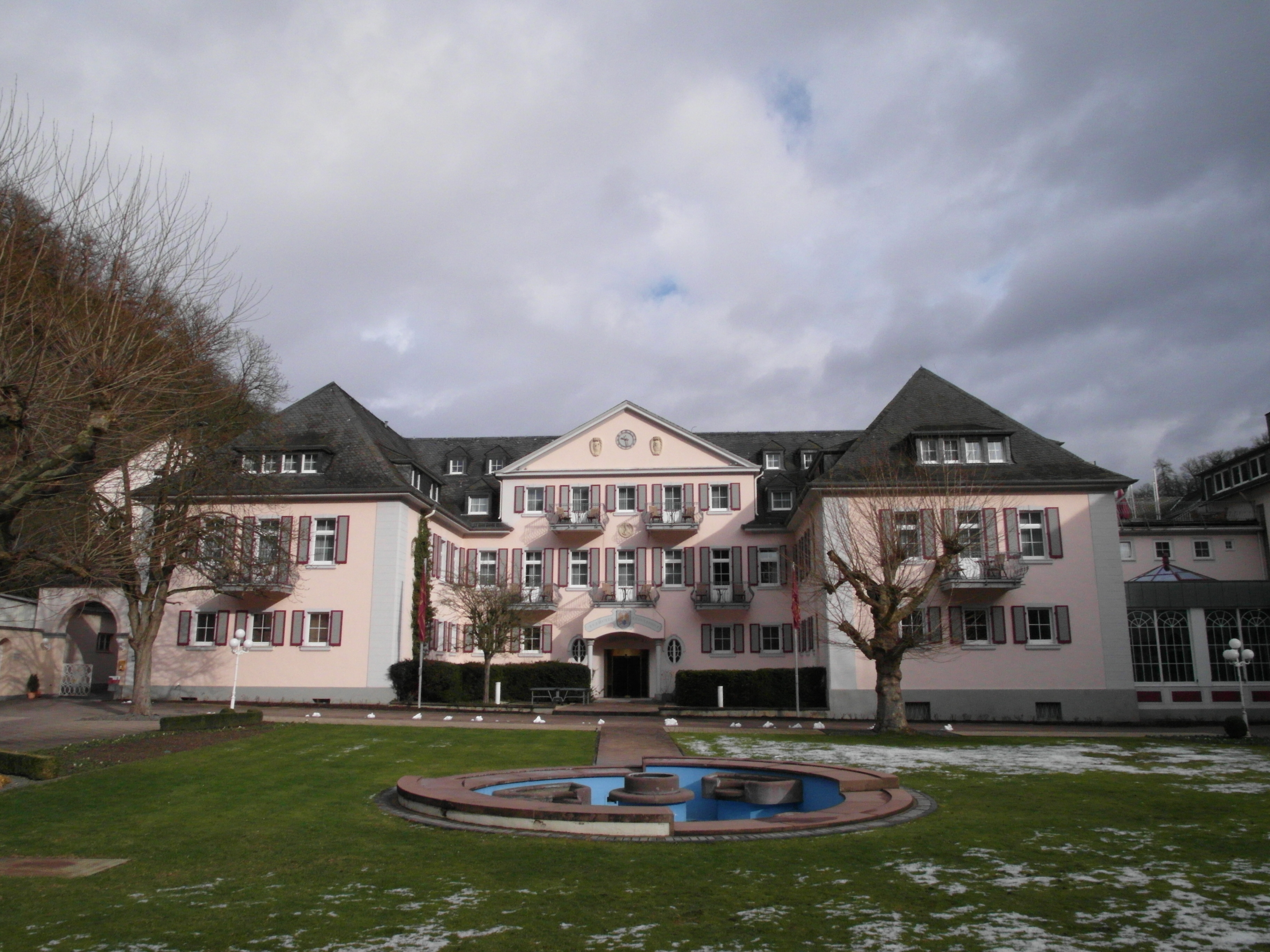
The great bathhouse

Bad Bertrich is an Ortsgemeinde – a municipality belonging to a Verbandsgemeinde, a kind of collective municipality – in the Cochem-Zell district in Rhineland-Palatinate, Germany. It belongs to the Verbandsgemeinde of Ulmen, whose seat is in the like-named town. The municipality is a state-owned spa (Staatsbad) and a health resort (Kurort).

== Geography ==
=== Location ===
The municipality lies in the southern Eifel in the Üßbach valley near the Moselle.

=== Constituent communities ===
Bad Bertrich's Ortsteile are the main centre, also called Bad Bertrich, and the outlying centre of Kennfus.

== History ==
Even as long ago as Roman Emperors Valentinian's and Gratian’s time, stately bathing houses were being built in Bertriacum. In 1097, Bad Bertrich had its first documentary mention in an ownership document from Archbishop Egilbert of Trier. In 1476, the village became an Electoral-Trier state-owned spa. Prince Clemens Wenceslaus of Saxony, the last Elector of Trier, had the little Electoral palace built here between 1785 and 1787, and used it as a summer seat and a hunting lodge. Beginning in 1794, Bad Bertrich lay under French rule. In 1815 it was assigned to the Kingdom of Prussia at the Congress of Vienna, whereupon it became a Prussian state-owned spa. Since 1946, it has been part of the then newly founded state of Rhineland-Palatinate. On 1 January 1975, the until then self-administering municipality of Kennfus was amalgamated with Bad Bertrich.

=== 2006 FIFA World Cup ===
For the 2006 FIFA World Cup, Bad Bertrich served as the Swiss national football team’s training camp. The Swiss team stayed at the five-star Häcker’s Kurhotel Fürstenhof. This was made possible by, among others, former mayor Günter Eichberg, former president of FC Schalke 04.

== Politics ==
=== Municipal council ===
The council is made up of 12 council members, who were elected by proportional representation at the municipal election held on 7 June 2009, and the honorary mayor as chairwoman.

The municipal election held on 7 June 2009 yielded the following results:

Year	SPD	CDU	WGR	Total
2009	–	–	12	12 seats
2004	3	5	8	16 seats

=== Mayor ===
Bad Bertrich's mayor is Christian Arnold.

=== Coat of arms ===
The municipality's arms might be blazoned thus: Per bend sinister, Or a double arch sable over a dais of the same, and gules an eagle rising, head bowed and wings displayed, argent.

== Culture and sightseeing ==
=== Buildings ===
The following are listed buildings or sites in Rhineland-Palatinate’s Directory of Cultural Monuments:

- Evangelical church, Kurfürstenstraße – quarrystone aisleless church from early 20th century; whole complex with graveyard wherein a cast-iron cross from about 1849; warriors’ memorial, lion, 1920s; soldiers’ graveyard, 1950s.
- Saint Peter’s Catholic Church (Kirche St. Peter), Kirchstraße 27 – Romanesque quarrystone aisleless church; campanile 1868/1869.
- Kirchstraße 10 – Catholic rectory, Gothic Revival quarrystone building, latter half of the 19th century.
- Kirchstraße 33 – Villa Sonnenschein (“Sunshine Villa”), Expressionist building with hipped roof, 1920s.
- Kurfürstenstraße 27 – hotel, Late Historicist building with mansard roof, about 1900.
- At Kurfürstenstraße 34 – spa parlour with pumproom and taproom, complex of plastered buildings with nine-axis, originally open pumproom, two-floor spa parlour with Baroque Revival mansard roof, 1927/1928.
- Kurfürstenstraße 34 – former Kavaliershaus (home for staffers who owned horses), now a spa hotel, three-floor, eleven-axis building with mansard roof, 1788–1789, side oriels built higher in 1928–1929.
- At Kurfürstenstraße 34 – former Electoral bathhouse (Badeschlösschen), seven-axis Classicist plastered building, 1786–1787.
- Kurfürstenstraße 36 – great bathhouse (now a spa treatment house), three-winged Baroque Revival complex, 1907–1909, expanded 1927.
- Kurfürstenstraße 76 – three-floor building with mansard roof, Expressionist influences, 1920s.
- Bismarckturm, on the Hohe Lei, southeast of the village – basalt quarrystone round tower with stone cupola, 1908.
- Clemens-Wenzeslaus-Hütte, Clemens-Wenzeslaus-Höhe, south of the village – Gothic Revival quarrystone building from 1889.
- Entersburg, northwest of the village – complex with lookout tower and several terraces with various wall remnants from the Nentirsburg (another castle), which was destroyed in 1138.
- Hohenzollernturm, northeast of the village – cast-iron tower with pointed top, latter half of the 19th century.
- Substation tower, on the slope over the Osbach's right bank, quarrystone Swiss chalet style building with mansard roof, early 20th century.

==== Kennfus ====
- Saint Mary's Catholic Church (branch church; Filialkirche St. Maria), Moselblickstraße 4 – Gothic Revival aisleless church, 1904; campanile 1955.
- Wayside chapel, south of the village on the road to Bad Bertrich – small aisleless church, 19th century, basalt cross from 1675.
- Wayside chapel, south of the village on the road to Bad Bertrich – small aisleless church, 19th century, relief inside, 18th century.
- Wayside chapel, on Landesstraße (State Road) 103, north of the village – aisleless church from 1889, two wooden sculptures inside, 19th century.

=== Events ===
In June and July 2007, the newly founded festival Eifel-Kulturtage (“Eifel Cultural Days”) was held in Bad Bertrich and at Himmerod Abbey. Heading the series of events, with more than 90 artists, was Rainer Laupichler.

== Economy and infrastructure ==
=== Bergquelle ===
The Bergquelle (“Mountain Spring”) is an extremely stable healing spring with regard to delivery and content consistency. It is a sodium sulphate bicarbonate hotspring.

== Notable people ==
=== Sons and daughters of the town ===
- Ottmar Dillenburg (b. 1961), Catholic priest, Federal Praeses of the Kolpingwerk Deutschland

=== Notable people associated with the municipality ===
- Josef Neunzig (1904-1965), Catholic priest persecuted in the time of the Third Reich
