= Alflen =

- Municipality
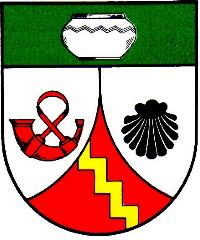
- Coat of arms

- Location of Alflen within Cochem-Zell district
- Interactive map of Alflen
- Location within Germany Location within Rhineland-Palatinate
- Coordinates: 50°10′37″N 7°2′24″E
- Country: Germany
- State: Rhineland-Palatinate
- District: Cochem-Zell
- Municipal assoc.: Ulmen

Government
  - Mayor (2019–24): Berthold Schäfer

Area
  - Total: 13.42 km^{2} (5.18 sq mi)
- Elevation: 435 m (1,427 ft)

Population (2025-12-31)
  - Total: 788
  - Density: 58.7/km^{2} (152/sq mi)
- Time zone: UTC+01:00 (CET)
  - Summer (DST): UTC+02:00 (CEST)
- Postal codes: 56828
- Dialling codes: 02678
- Vehicle registration: COC
- Website: www.alflen.de

Alflen is an Ortsgemeinde – a municipality belonging to a Verbandsgemeinde, a kind of collective municipality – in the Cochem-Zell district in Rhineland-Palatinate, Germany. It belongs to the Verbandsgemeinde of Ulmen, whose seat is in the like-named town.

== Geography ==
The raised part of the village is called Kirch-Alflen for the church there (the first syllable comes from Kirche, which means “church” in German), and may well be the older part of the village. Beyond the river Litzbach lies the Überdorf (“Upper Village”) in a hollow.

== History ==
In Alflona, the Karden ecclesiastical foundation owned, according to the directory of holdings compiled about 1100, an estate along with lands worked by compulsory labour and rights to two thirds of the parish's tithes. This holding was confirmed by Pope Alexander III in 1178. The foundation still held the tithing rights until the late 18th century. Named in the document issued by Pope Eugene III for the Abbey of Echternach in 1148 was, among other things, a lesser holding near Alflue or Afflue; another such reference crops up from 1161.

The parish church, first mentioned about 1100, was listed at the turn of the 13th century in Electoral Trier's Liber annalium; it was, along with its parochial area, subject to the collegiate church in Karden. About 1330, it was once again mentioned, this time in the Taxa generalis (another Trier directory of holdings). Further mentions are to be found from 1475 and 1656 in the Karden and Zell Archdeaconries’ protocols, and others came in 1592 and the 1552 register also mentioning John the Baptist’s patronage. Saint Bartholomew is also mentioned as a secondary patron.

Beginning in 1794, Alflen lay under French rule. In 1815 it was assigned to the Kingdom of Prussia at the Congress of Vienna. Since 1946, it has been part of the then newly founded state of Rhineland-Palatinate.

== Politics ==
=== Municipal council ===
The council is made up of 12 council members, who were elected by majority vote at the municipal election held on 7 June 2009, and the honorary mayor as chairman.

=== Mayor ===
Alflen’s mayor is Berthold Schäfer.

=== Coat of arms ===
The German blazon reads: In grünem Schildhaupt eine silberne Urne, in Silber eine eingeschweifte rote Spitze, darin ein goldener Sparrenschrägbalken, vorne ein rotes Hifthorn, hinten eine schwarze Muschel.

The municipality’s arms might in English heraldic language be described thus: Tierced in mantle, dexter argent a bugle-horn gules, sinister argent an escallop sable, in base gules a bend dancetty Or, on a chief vert an urn of the first.

The charge in the chief, an urn, stands for the village’s long settlement history, dating back to prehistory. In the cadastral area of Linderflur in 1823, various details of this were brought to light. The horn, the scallop shell and the “bend dancetty” (slanted zigzag stripe) are all drawn from the arms once borne by the Metternich-Winneburg-Beilstein noble family, and can be found in the court seals from 1477 and 1761. This family held the lordship in the village and also owned lands. The Weistum of 1494 guaranteed the Winneburg-Beilstein family the local high court jurisdiction as well as hunting and forest rights (a Weistum – cognate with English wisdom – was a legal pronouncement issued by men learned in law in the Middle Ages and early modern times). In 1652, the court passed to the Baron of Metternich.

== Culture and sightseeing ==
=== Museums ===
As a result of an exhibition organized by the Cochem-Zell district administration named On de Geman gien (in Standard High German In die Gemeinde gehen, meaning “Go into the Community”) at which were shown old communication methods and technology, the Alflen Local History Museum (Heimatmuseum Alflen) came into being. It was set up on the attic floor of the old school, which is now the kindergarten and youth group building.

=== Buildings ===
Saint John the Baptist’s Parish Church with its Gothic building style and its ceiling paintings are often considered to be one of the most noteworthy churches in the area. The church is surrounded by three great chestnut trees, each more than 300 years old.

The “Felser-” Haus, a timber-frame house from 1880 below the church, stood through both World Wars although it was once the target of a grenade attack. Formerly it housed a shop, but is now only a residential building.

The following are listed buildings or sites in Rhineland-Palatinate’s Directory of Cultural Monuments:

- Saint John the Baptist’s Catholic Parish Church (Pfarrkirche St. Johann Baptist), Pfarrweg – west tower’s lower building work Romanesque, upper floors and nave from after 1716, Late Gothic quire and sacristy renovated after 1716; whole complex with graveyard.
- Chapel, small aisleless church with niche relief, apparently essentially 16th century, rebuilt in 1921 as a warriors’ remembrance chapel.
- Way of the Cross – Crucifixion relief at the chapel, from 1766.

== Economy and infrastructure ==
In the 1950s, the Büchel Air Base was built and to this day, the airbase is still one of the area's most important employers, and home to Jagdbombergeschwader 33 (Fighter-Bomber Squadron 33).

== Sundry ==
In Alflen, film producer Stefan Dähnert shot the film Engrazia about a problem-beset girl's youth.
