= Wollmerath =

- Municipality
- Coat of arms

- Location of Wollmerath within Cochem-Zell district
- Interactive map of Wollmerath
- Location within Germany Location within Rhineland-Palatinate
- Coordinates: 50°9′25″N 6°58′57″E
- Country: Germany
- State: Rhineland-Palatinate
- District: Cochem-Zell
- Municipal assoc.: Ulmen

Government
  - Mayor (2019–24): Ulrich Laux

Area
  - Total: 4.06 km^{2} (1.57 sq mi)
- Elevation: 366 m (1,201 ft)

Population (2025-12-31)
  - Total: 199
  - Density: 49.0/km^{2} (127/sq mi)
- Time zone: UTC+01:00 (CET)
  - Summer (DST): UTC+02:00 (CEST)
- Postal codes: 56826
- Dialling codes: 02677
- Vehicle registration: COC
- Website: www.wollmerath.de

Wollmerath is an Ortsgemeinde – a municipality belonging to a Verbandsgemeinde, a kind of collective municipality – in the Cochem-Zell district in Rhineland-Palatinate, Germany. It belongs to the Verbandsgemeinde of Ulmen, whose seat is in the like-named town.

== Geography ==
The municipality lies in the Eifel roughly 6 km south of Ulmen.

== History ==
In 1193, Wollmerath had its first documentary mention. With the occupation of the Rhine’s left bank by French Revolutionary troops in 1794, the Electorate of Trier, for centuries the local overlord, fell. In 1815 Wollmerath was assigned to the Kingdom of Prussia at the Congress of Vienna. Since 1946, it has been part of the then newly founded state of Rhineland-Palatinate.

== Politics ==
=== Municipal council ===
The council is made up of 6 council members, who were elected by majority vote at the municipal election held on 7 June 2009, and the honorary mayor as chairman.

=== Mayor ===
Wollmerath's mayor is Ulrich Laux.

=== Coat of arms ===
The municipality's arms might be described thus: Azure issuant from base a wall flanked by towers domed argent, the wall charged with a cross Latin bottony reversed with a fifth button midway along the upper arm sable, in chief three annulets, two and one, between two ears of wheat palewise Or.

== Culture and sightseeing ==
=== Buildings ===
The following are listed buildings or sites in Rhineland-Palatinate’s Directory of Cultural Monuments:

- Saint Mary Magdalene's Catholic Church (Kirche St. Maria Magdalena), Hauptstraße – Romanesque tower, Baroque aisleless church, marked 1732; graveyard with wall: sandstone cross; basalt quarrystone chapel; cross and tomb slabs, 1721 and 18th century; basalt Station of the Cross, Bildstock form, 19th century; whole complex with church and graveyard
- Auf der Burg 1 – plastered building with round-arched cellar portal, 18th century, possibly older
- Hauptstraße – wayside chapel; basalt block building, 19th century
- Hauptstraße 31 – rectory; building with hipped roof, marked 1719
- Hauptstraße 42 – building with hipped mansard roof, 18th century
- Kirchweg 5 – former school; timber-frame building, partly solid or slated, 19th century
- On Landesstraße (State Road) 102, going towards Wagenhausen – Heiligenhäuschen (a small, shrinelike structure consecrated to a saint or saints); Trinity relief with sponsor, 17th century
- On Landesstraße 102, going towards Wagenhausen – wayside chapel

Saint Mary Magdalene's Church also has a 250-year-old organ.
