= Ulmen =

- Town
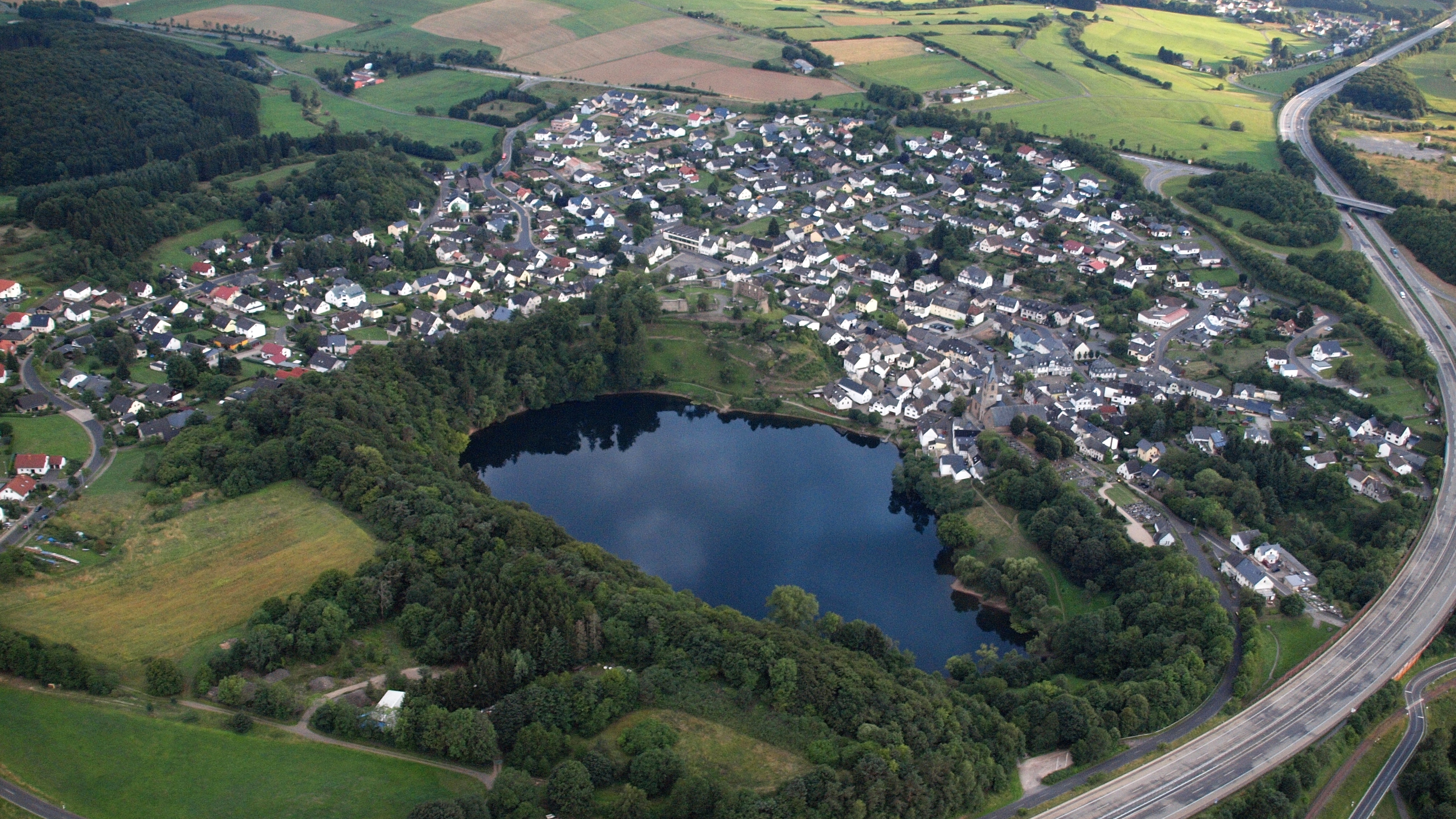
- Aerial view of Ulmen

- Coat of arms

- Location of Ulmen within Cochem-Zell district
- Interactive map of Ulmen
- Location within Germany Location within Rhineland-Palatinate
- Coordinates: 50°12′31.28″N 6°58′46.52″E
- Country: Germany
- State: Rhineland-Palatinate
- District: Cochem-Zell
- Municipal assoc.: Ulmen

Government
  - Mayor (2019–24): Thomas Kerpen (CDU)

Area
  - Total: 28.74 km^{2} (11.10 sq mi)
- Elevation: 452 m (1,483 ft)

Population (2025-12-31)
  - Total: 3,431
  - Density: 119.4/km^{2} (309.2/sq mi)
- Time zone: UTC+01:00 (CET)
  - Summer (DST): UTC+02:00 (CEST)
- Postal codes: 56766
- Dialling codes: 02676
- Vehicle registration: COC
- Website: www.stadt-ulmen.de

Ulmen (German pronunciation: [ˈʊlmən]) is a town in the Cochem-Zell district in Rhineland-Palatinate, Germany. It is the seat of the like-named Verbandsgemeinde – a kind of collective municipality – to which it also belongs.

== Geography ==
=== Location ===
The town lies in the Eifel some 11 km northwest of Cochem.

=== Constituent communities ===
To Ulmen belong the outlying centres – Stadtteile – of Meiserich, Vorpochten and Furth.

=== Geology ===
The Ulmener Maar, only about 11,000 years old, is not only a maar but also Continental Europe's newest volcano north of the Alps. It is 37 m deep. Volcanic activity can be observed at depths of more than 4 m in the form of rising gas bubbles. The Ulmener Maar has no natural water inflow or outflow. The two tunnels that hold the water at a constant level today were dug in the 19th century.

Another maar in town is the 118,000-year-old Jungferweiher, which is considerably bigger than the Ulmener Maar. Formerly used as a fishpond for the lords of the castle, it dried up over the centuries until in the 1930s, it had become a peat bog. In 1942, however, the maar was flooded once again to regulate the water level in the nearby maar.

== History ==
In 1074, Ulmen had its first documentary mention, though Merovingian graves south of the castle bear witness to earlier habitation within town limits. There have also been suspected Roman finds, but these have not yet been verified.

Sir Heinrich von Ulmen, a knight, went on the Fourth Crusade to Constantinople, whence he brought valuable treasures back, among others the famous Limburger Staurothek ("Limburg Reliquary of the True Cross"), which can still be seen in the cathedral in Limburg an der Lahn. His successors were in the 15th century subject to the Trier Archiepiscopal Foundation's public peace (Landfrieden). The "Sun King" Louis XIV of France conquered Ulmen twice and burnt it down. Both times, the castle and the town were built up again. Beginning in 1794, Ulmen lay under French rule. In 1815 it was assigned to the Kingdom of Prussia at the Congress of Vienna. Since 1946, it has been part of the then newly founded state of Rhineland-Palatinate.

Many old buildings bear witness even today to Ulmen's historical past. In the 19th century, when buildings confiscated by Napoleon were transferred to Prussian ownership, a Cochem townsman bought the castle and used it as a quarry. When Ulmen all but burnt down in a fire in 1831, the houses were rebuilt using stones from the castle. Since then, it has been a ruin.

In the forest that abuts the town is an old spring near which some Roman and Celtic figures were found. This spring is called Dietzjes Bärechje, a reference to children; for centuries, women prayed here for a good birth and healthy children.

In 1376, Ulmen was granted town rights by Emperor Karl IV. These rights were, however, lost as the Prussians took over the Rhineland in 1815. By decision of the Rhineland-Palatinate Cabinet on 1 September 2009, Ulmen was once again allowed to bear the designation Stadt ("town") with effect from 2 October 2009.

== Politics ==
=== Town council ===
The council is made up of 20 council members, who were elected by proportional representation at the municipal election held on 7 June 2009, and the honorary mayor as chairman.

The municipal election held on 7 June 2009 yielded the following results:

Year	SPD	CDU	FDP	UWG	Total
2009	5	7	–	8	20 seats
2004	4	9	0	7	20 seats

=== Mayor ===
Ulmen's mayor is Thomas Kerpen (CDU).

=== Coat of arms ===
The town's arms might be described thus: Per pale Or issuant from base a poleaxe sable and gules issuant from base a gatehouse with flanking towers embattled, the dexter taller than the sinister argent, on a chief of the fourth eight lozenges conjoined in fess throughout of the third.

=== Town partnerships ===
Ulmen fosters partnerships with the following places:

- Lormes, Nièvre, France

In 1994, Ulmen and Lormes initiated the first contacts for a partnership. Both places contain an element meaning "elm" in their respective languages (Ulme, pl. Ulmen in German; orme in French). The partnership documents were signed in Lormes on 23 June 1996.

== Culture and sightseeing ==
=== Museums ===
- School museum with a reconstructed classroom from the Volksschule.

=== Buildings ===
The following are listed buildings or sites in Rhineland-Palatinate's Directory of Cultural Monuments:

==== Ulmen (main centre) ====
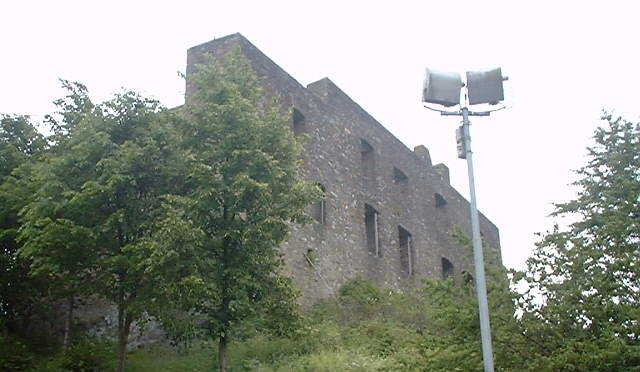
Ulmen, Castle Ulmen monumental zone

- Ulmen Castle (Burg Ulmen, monumental zone) – castle complex consisting of Niederburg ("Lower Castle"), from before 1292, and Oberburg ("Upper Castle"), 1679 partly destroyed; dungeonlike gateway, of the Niederburg only sparse wall remnants left; in the Oberburg the girding wall of the Electoral-Trier Amtshaus, an essentially late mediaeval building, completed in 1682–1683, parts of the girding wall, fountain reconstructed; includes castle hill as well as the buildings from the 18th and 19th century at Bachstraße 2 and Burgfrieden 4, 5, 8 and 12
- Saint Matthias's Catholic Parish Church (Pfarrkirche St. Matthias), Am Maar – two-naved hall church, 1905, with the use of parts of the former Late Gothic church; transept on the site of the quire, 1966/1967; graveyard: Bonsig tomb, 19th century; warriors' memorial, 1920s; whole complex of church and graveyard
- Antoniusstraße 2 – former Electoral-Trier tithe house; building with mansard roof, marked 1727
- Cochemer Straße/corner of Burgfrieden – sandstone wayside cross, first third of the 18th century
- At In der Lay 1 – basalt wayside cross, marked 1817
- In der Lay 2 – timber-frame house, commercial building, about 1840
- At In der Lay 3 – coat of arms, 18th century
- At In der Lay 3 – timber-frame house, balloon frame, early 16th century, remodelled in the 19th century
- In der Lay 4 – timber-frame house, partly solid, first third of the 19th century
- Winkelstraße 22 – former school; plastered building on quarrystone pedestal, partly timber-frame, Swiss chalet style, marked 1910–1911
- At Winkelstraße 36 – Bildstock, 19th century
- Antoniuskapelle – open chapel, marked 1659; cross, marked 1659, Electoral-Trier Amtsmann Georg von Metzenhausen's coat of arms
- Waterworks – two basalt quarrystone buildings, marked 1940; whole complex

==== Furth ====
- Further Mühle (mill) – L-shaped complex, 19th century, plastered building, barn, millraces, girding wall, bridge

==== Meiserich ====
- Saint Anne's Catholic Branch Chapel (Filialkapelle St. Anna) – aisleless church, essentially Late Gothic (1521), extension around tower marked 1793
- Ulmener Straße 3 – L-shaped complex, 19th century
- Before Ulmener Straße 4 – hand pump, with vase, marked 1909

Castle Ulmen, nowadays only a ruin, was built sometime about the year 1000, apparently on the remnants of a Roman building, although this has never been established through archaeological findings. Its current state is marked by somewhat less than successful restoration measures which have hidden much of the building's original substance.

Saint Matthias's Parish Church was built in Romanesque Revival-Gothic Revival style.

=== Music ===
- The Spielmannszug Blau-Weiss 1952 Ulmen e.V. (band) under Rainer Pias's direction.
- The Musikverein Ulmen e.V. (music club), under Klaus Mohr's direction for almost 30 years now, was founded on 24 January 1969 and today has 50 active members and a further 66 inactive ones.

=== Sport ===
The Sportverein Fortuna Ulmen e.V. (sport club) was founded on 21 September 1921 and offers active sport in the departments of aerobics, men's and women's artistic gymnastics, football, "seniors'" football, track and field, skipping, table tennis, gymnastics and volleyball.

=== Regular events ===
- The Castle Festival (Burgfest) is held yearly in July at the Ulmen castle ruins.
- Every three years on 3 October, the Appelfest is held at the Alter Postplatz by the Eifel Club.

=== Sightseeing gallery ===
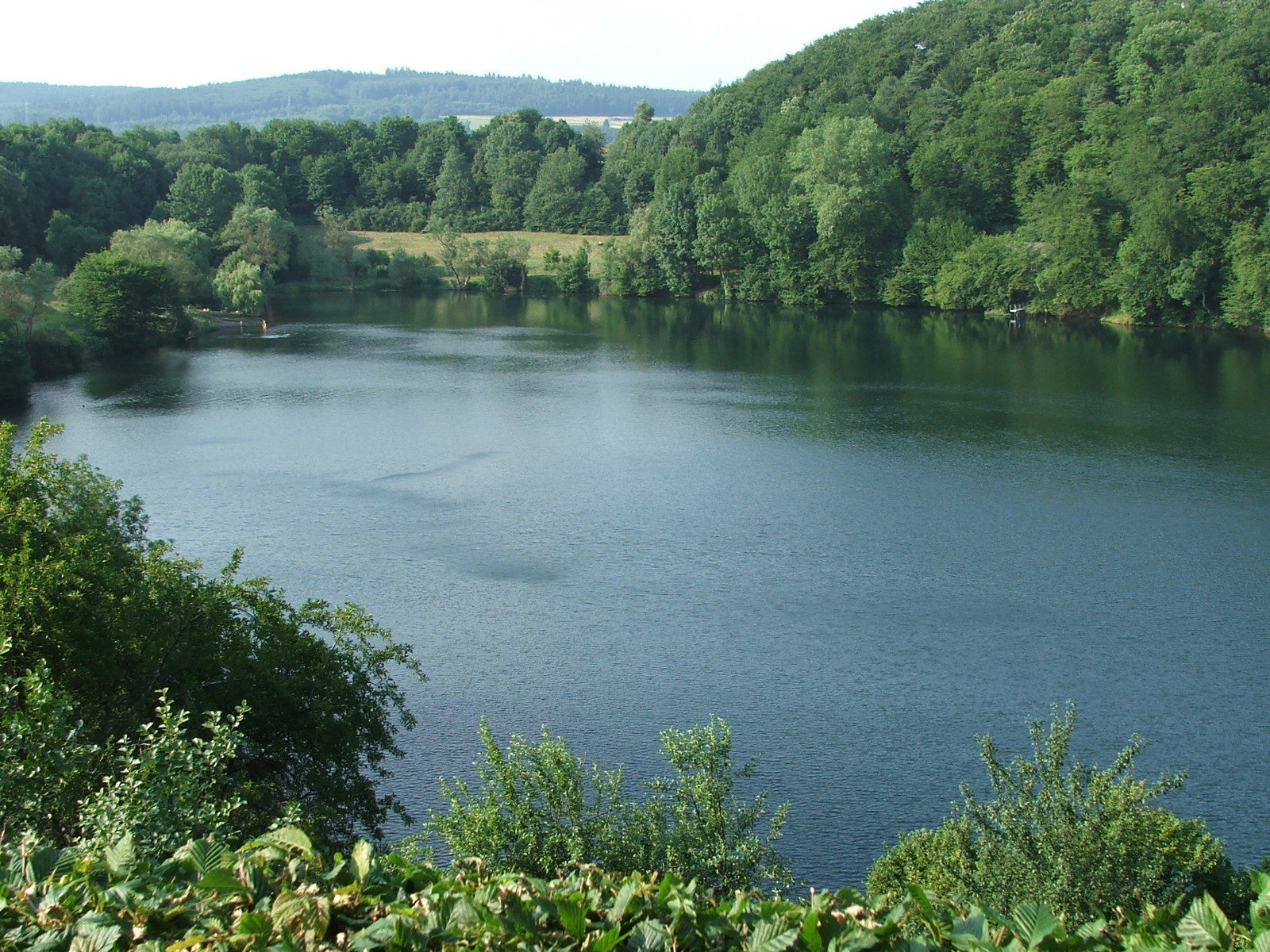
Ulmener Maar, seen from the castle.

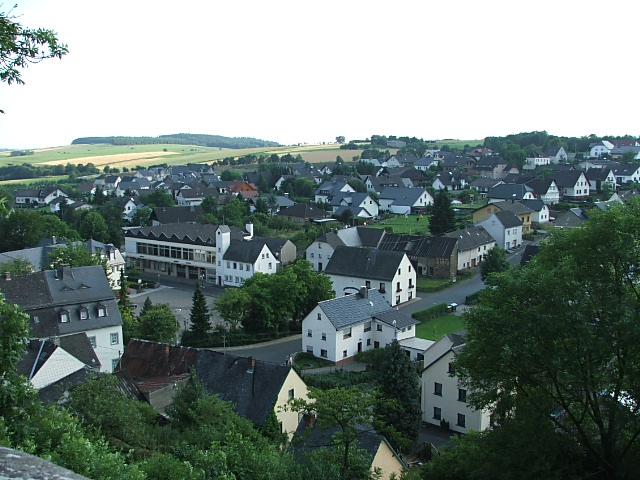
Ulmen village centre with marketplace and Bürgersaal, seen from the castle.

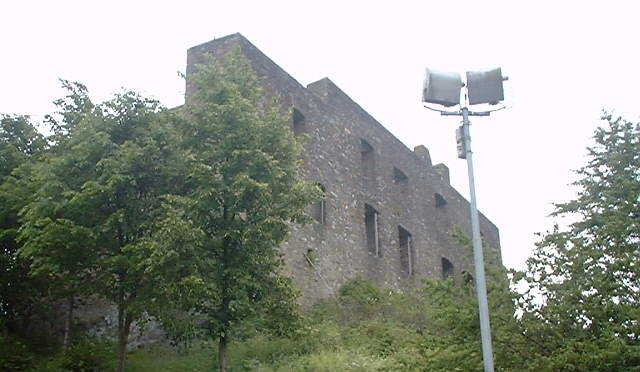
Front of the Ulmen castle ruins.

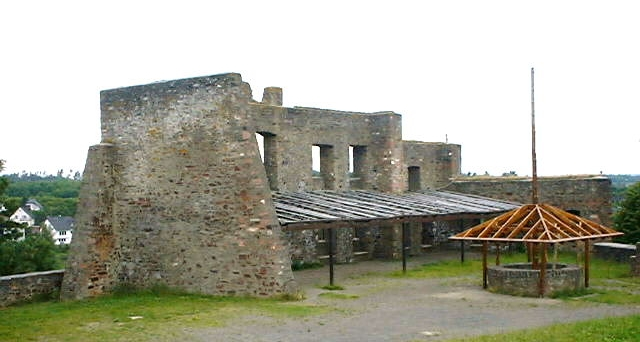
Inside view of the Ulmen castle ruins.

== Economy and infrastructure ==
=== Education ===
- Kindergarten Ulmen
- Grundschule Ulmen (primary school)
- Realschule plus Vulkaneifel Ulmen/Lutzerath

=== Bundeswehr presence ===
The Schule für Diensthundewesen der Bundeswehr – a training school for dogs used in the German military – was moved in April 2005 from Koblenz-Bubenheim to the former munitions depot in the Hochpochtener Wald (forest) near Ulmen. Both the dogs themselves and their trainers are trained here. In the framework of the festivities for the school's 50th anniversary on 8 August 2008, the until now nameless installation in the Hochpochtener Wald was given the name Gräfin von Maltzan-Kaserne (Kaserne means "barracks"), after the veterinarian Maria von Maltzan, who was a member of the German Resistance in the time of the Third Reich; she helped those who were subject to Adolf Hitler's repression and persecution, even hiding her future husband, a Jew, inside a couch. The then Ortsgemeinde of Ulmen took over sponsorship of this Bundeswehr facility, which was unique in Germany, on 30 January 2009.

== Transport ==
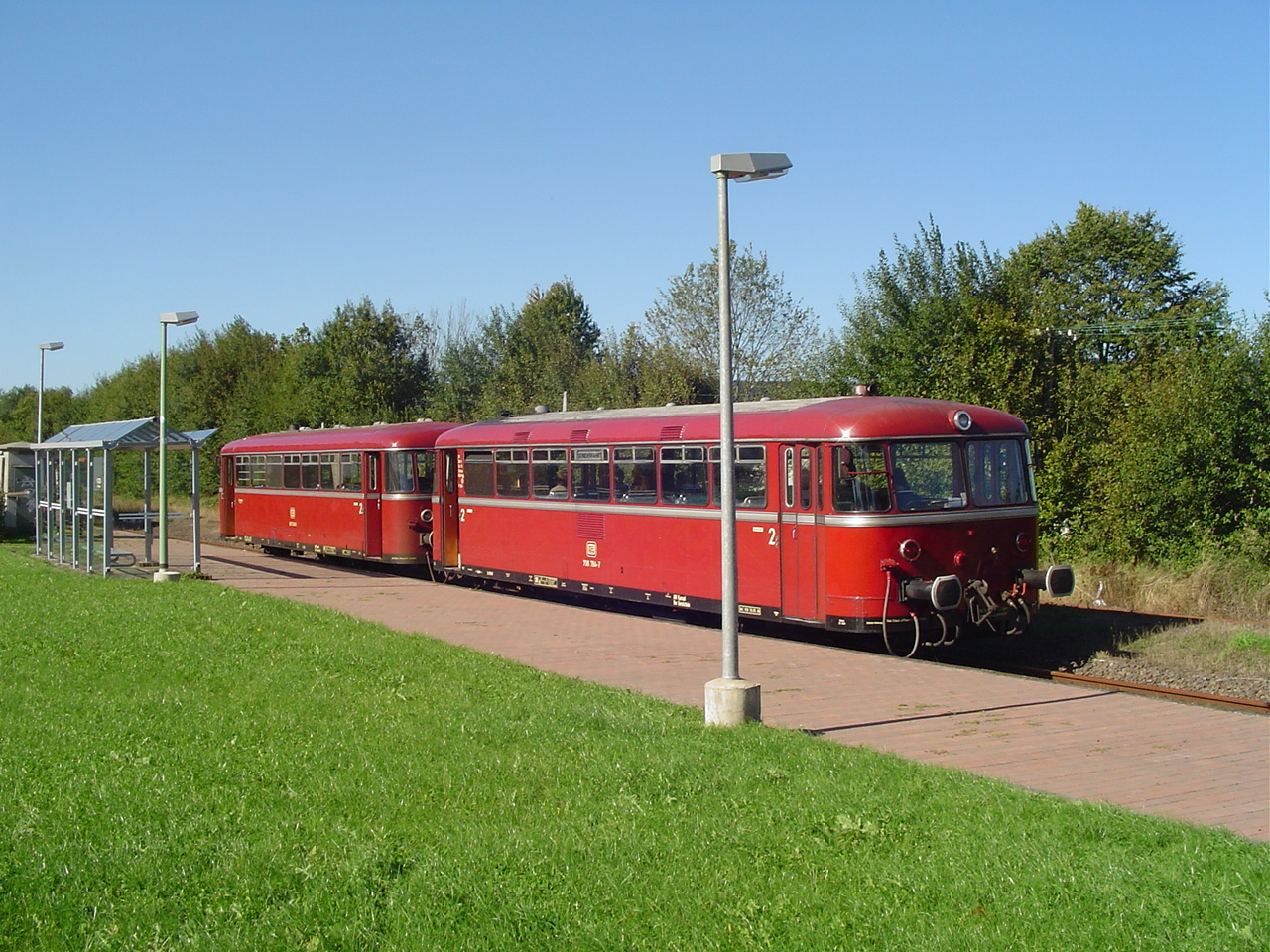
Touristik special train serving Ulmen

Ulmen has a train station at Cross Eifel Railway, which is currently out of service between Gerolstein and Kaisersesch. Ulmen is connected to the local bus network and located in the transport association VRM, in the zone number 731.
