= Neuerburg (Verbandsgemeinde) =

Coordinates: 50.011°N 6.296°E

Neuerburg is a former Verbandsgemeinde ("collective municipality") in the district Bitburg-Prüm, in Rhineland-Palatinate, Germany. The seat of the Verbandsgemeinde was in Neuerburg. On 1 July 2014 it merged into the new Verbandsgemeinde Südeifel.

The Verbandsgemeinde Neuerburg consisted of the following Ortsgemeinden ("local municipalities"):

1. Affler
2. Altscheid
3. Ammeldingen an der Our
4. Ammeldingen bei Neuerburg
5. Bauler
6. Berkoth
7. Berscheid
8. Biesdorf
9. Burg
10. Dauwelshausen
11. Emmelbaum
12. Fischbach-Oberraden
13. Geichlingen
14. Gemünd
15. Gentingen
16. Heilbach
17. Herbstmühle
18. Hommerdingen
19. Hütten
20. Hüttingen bei Lahr
21. Karlshausen
22. Keppeshausen
23. Körperich
24. Koxhausen
25. Kruchten
26. Lahr
27. Leimbach
28. Mettendorf
29. Muxerath
30. Nasingen
31. Neuerburg
32. Niedergeckler
33. Niederraden
34. Niehl
35. Nusbaum
36. Obergeckler
37. Plascheid
38. Rodershausen
39. Roth an der Our
40. Scheitenkorb
41. Scheuern
42. Sevenig bei Neuerburg
43. Sinspelt
44. Übereisenbach
45. Uppershausen
46. Utscheid
47. Waldhof-Falkenstein
48. Weidingen
49. Zweifelscheid
