= Irrel (Verbandsgemeinde) =

Coordinates: 49.847°N 6.456°E

Irrel was a former Verbandsgemeinde ("collective municipality") in the district Bitburg-Prüm, in Rhineland-Palatinate, Germany. The seat of the Verbandsgemeinde was in Irrel. On 1 July 2014 it merged into the new Verbandsgemeinde Südeifel.

The Verbandsgemeinde Irrel consisted of the following Ortsgemeinden ("local municipalities"):

1. Alsdorf
2. Bollendorf
3. Echternacherbrück
4. Eisenach
5. Ernzen
6. Ferschweiler
7. Gilzem
8. Holsthum
9. Irrel
10. Kaschenbach
11. Menningen
12. Minden
13. Niederweis
14. Peffingen
15. Prümzurlay
16. Schankweiler
17. Wallendorf
