= Enz (Prüm) =

River in Germany

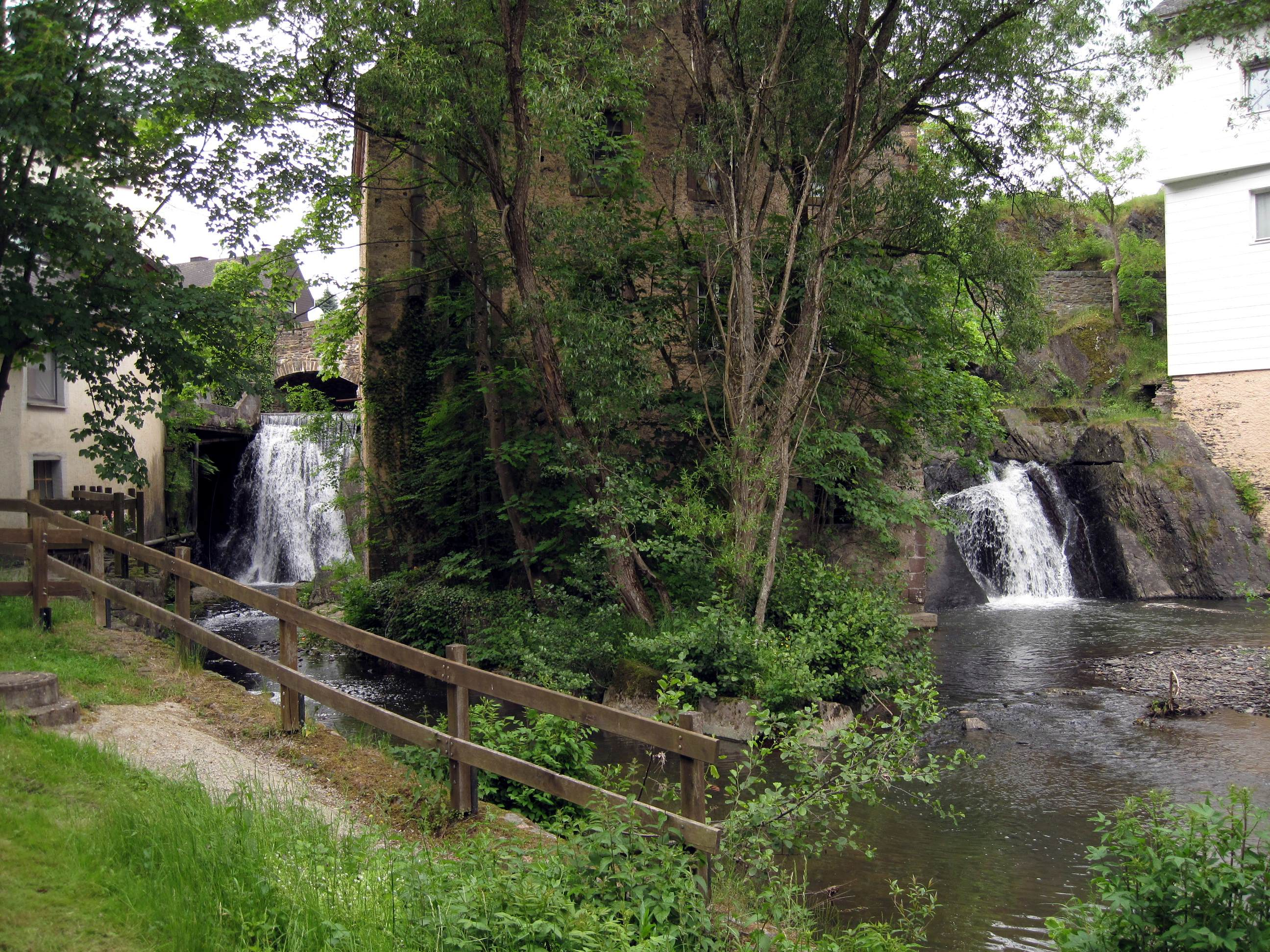
- Waterfall on the Enz in Neuerburg

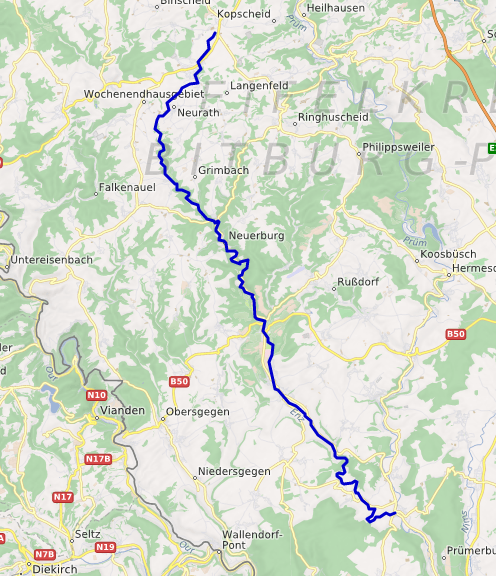
- Course of the Enz

Location
- Country: Germany
- State: Rhineland-Palatinate
- Reference no.: DE: 26286

Physical characteristics
- Source
  - location: north of Arzfeld
  - coordinates: 50°6′13″N 6°17′18″E
  - elevation: 544 m above sea level (NHN)
- Mouth
  - location: in Holsthum into the Prüm
  - coordinates: 49°53′29″N 6°24′41″E
  - elevation: 189 m above sea level (NHN)
- Length: 37.927 km (23.567 mi)
- Basin size: 148.516 km²

Basin features
- Progression: Prüm→ Sauer→ Moselle→ Rhine→ North Sea

The Enz (German pronunciation: [ɛnts]; also: Enzbach) is a 37.9-kilometre-long (23.5 mi), orographically right-hand tributary of the Prüm in the Eifel mountains of Germany.

== Geography ==
The Enz rises about 650 metres (2,100 ft) south-southwest of Lichtenborn at a height of 544 m above sea level (NHN). Its source region is on the Arzfeld Plateau (Arzfelder Hochfläche). From here it flows initially mainly in a south-southwesterly direction and, after about 150 metres (490 ft), reaches the municipality of Arzfeld. Continuing in a south-southwesterly direction, it flows through Arzfeld. At the Arzfeld Mill (Arzfeldermühle), the Enz is impounded to form a small pond. Roughly below the mill the Enz heads southwards, forming the municipal boundary between Kickeshausen and Arzfeld, and then, further south, between Jucken und Emmelbaum. This is the start of the Neuerburg Enz Valley (Neuerburger Enztal). On its way to Neuerburg, the Enz now turns in a southeasterly direction. After passing the villages of Enztalhof, Engelsdorf, Zweifelscheid, Weidendell and Beyerhof, the Enz reaches the village of In der Enz, where the Wahlbach joins it from the right.

A little later, the Enz reaches Neuerburg. By the old mill, the waters of the Enz flow over a waterfall. Below the fall, the Enz continues heading southeast making several bends. After passing Daudistel the Enz crosses the municipal boundary into Sinspelt. At the northern edge of the village the Radenbach, the Enz’s largest tributary, joins from the right. Continuing southeast the Enz passes Mettendorf, Enzen and Schankweiler. Below Schankweiler it turns in a prominent bend towards the east before emptying into the Prüm in Holsthum at a height of 189 m above NHN.

On its 37.9-kilometre-long (23.5 mi) route the Enz drops through a height of 355 metres, which gives an average riverbed gradient of 9.4 per mille. Its catchment covers and area of 148.5 km^{2} (57.3 sq mi) and it drains via the Prüm, Sauer, Moselle and Rhine into the North Sea.

=== Tributaries ===
Numerous, mostly short, tributaries flow into the Enz from the uplands. Its most important tributary is the 12.2-kilometre-long (7.6 mi) Radenbach. The following table gives details of the tributaries according to the water management authorities of the state of Rhineland-Palatinate.

| Name | Location [km] | Left/right tributary | Length [km] | Catchment [km²] | Mouth elevation [m above NHN] | GKZ |
|---|---|---|---|---|---|---|
| N.N. | 35.680 | left | 0.6 | 0.414 | 480 | 26286 112 |
| Betzbach | 34.910 | left | 2.4 | 4.016 | 467 | 26286 12 |
| Kuhbach | 32.250 | right | 1.5 | 1.184 | 434 | 26286 14 |
| Emmelseifen | 28.520 | left | 2.6 | 2.767 | 389 | 26286 16 |
| Grimbach | 25.540 | left | 3.2 | 3.491 | 353 | 26286 18 |
| Wahlbach | 24.080 | left | 7.9 | 16.940 | 339 | 26286 2 |
| Radenbach | 15.920 | left | 12.2 | 36.260 | 276 | 26286 4 |
| Ringsbach | 13.990 | left | 2.6 | 3.717 | 263 | 26286 54 |
| Asterbach | 13.120 | left | 2.0 | 1.780 | 257 | 26286 592 |
| Alsbach | 11.730 | right | 3.5 | 6.187 | 249 | 26286 6 |
| Urselt | 9.260 | right | 1.0 | 1.803 | 238 | 26286 72 |
| Silberbach | 7.220 | right | 3.3 | 3.787 | 226 | 26286 74 |
| Rohrbach | 5.060 | left | 4.6 | 5.406 | 216 | 26286 8 |
| Diebach | 2.570 | right | 1.7 | 1.778 | 203 | 26286 92 |
| Fielsbach | 0.294 | right | 0.9 | 1.067 | 189 | 26286 94 |

== Environment ==
From its source to its confluence with the Radenbach, the Enz has among the highest concentration of coarse material and silicates of streams in the German Central Uplands (Type 5) and below the confluence has one of the highest concentrations of fine to coarse silicates (Type 9). Its water quality is recorded as slightly contaminated downstream of Arzfeld. In the section from Neurath to Neuerburg, its water quality is moderately polluted and from Neuerburg to its mouth it is assessed as slightly polluted.

== Transport routes ==
The old railway line from Pronsfeld via Arzfeld to Neuerburg (Enz Valley Railway), a branch line of the West Eifel Railway, runs through the upper valley of the Enz. After its closure in 1989, the tracks were lifted and sections of the trackbed were converted into a cycleway. Since late 2011, the cycle path from Pronsfeld to Neuerburg has been completely tarmacked.

== See also ==
- List of rivers of Rhineland-Palatinate
