= Ammeldingen =

Ammeldingen is the name of two different municipalities in the district of Bitburg-Prüm, in Rhineland-Palatinate, western Germany:

- Ammeldingen an der Our
- Ammeldingen bei Neuerburg
