= Sevenig =

Sevenig may refer to two municipalities in the district Bitburg-Prüm, Rhineland-Palatinate, Germany:

- Sevenig (Our), part of the Verbandsgemeinde Arzfeld
- Sevenig bei Neuerburg, part of the Verbandsgemeinde Südeifel
