= Eifel-Ardennes Green Route =

Walking route in France, Belgium, Luxembourg, and Germany

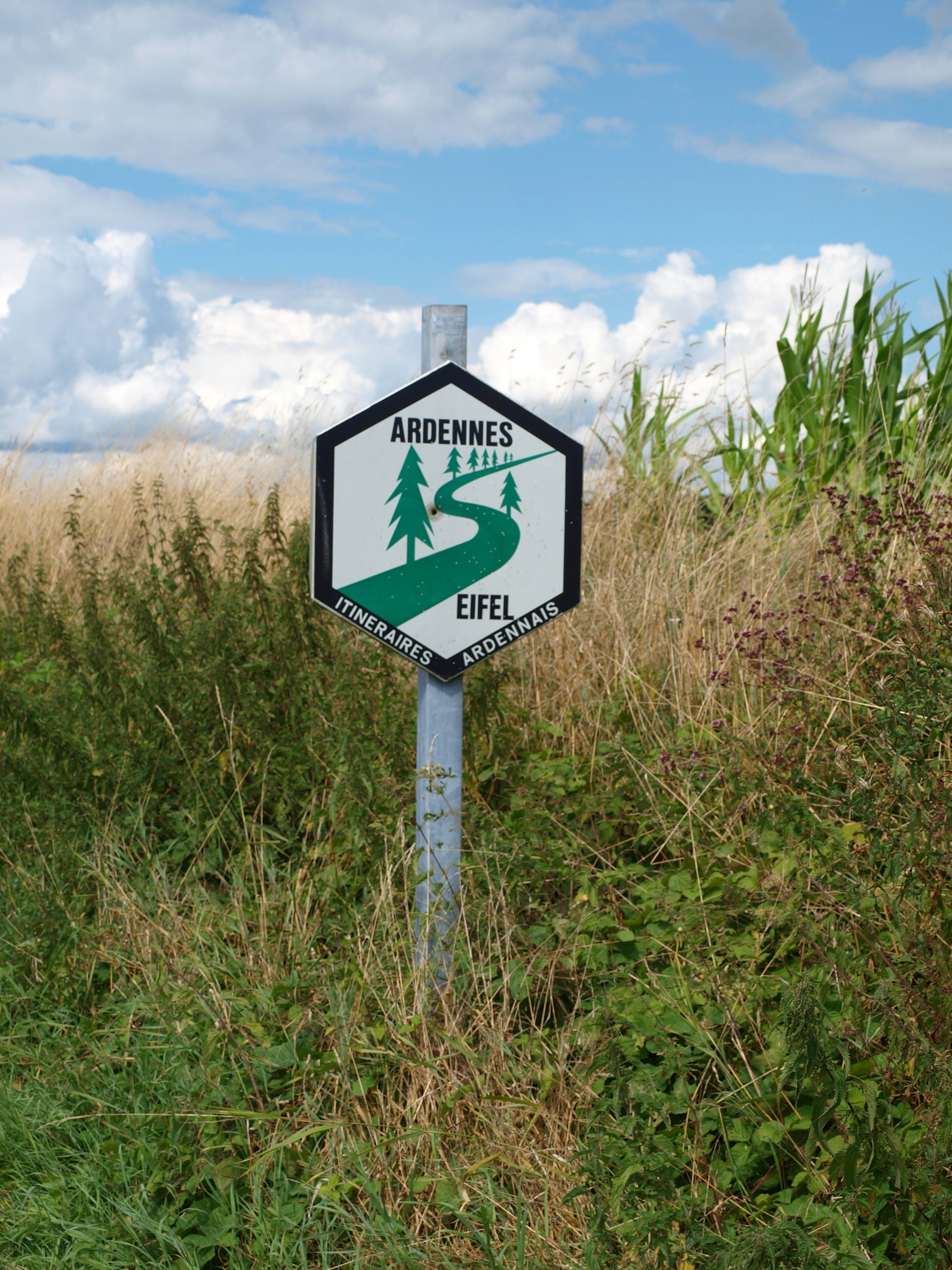
Green Route sign

The Eifel-Ardennes Green Route or Eifel-Ardennes Green Road (German: Grüne Straße Eifel-Ardennen, French: Route Verte Ardennes-Eifel) is a cross-border, tourist route, about 500 kilometres long, which links the Ardennes to the Eifel. It runs from France via Belgium and Luxembourg to Germany mainly on quiet by-ways.

== Course ==
- France (ca. 90 km)

Rethel - Attigny - Le Chesne - Sedan - Bazeilles

- Belgium (ca. 115 km)

Bouillon - Cugnon - Mortehan - Auby-sur-Semois - Herbeumont - Florenville - Villers-devant-Orval - Habay-la-Neuve - Martelange

- Luxembourg (ca. 95 km)

Esch-sur-Sûre - Wiltz - Clervaux - Hosingen - Diekirch - Vianden

- Germany (ca. 200 km)

Roth an der Our - Sinspelt - Bitburg - Malberg - Kyllburg - Oberkail - Himmerod Abbey - Manderscheid - Weinfelder Maar - Schalkenmehrener Maar - Daun - Kelberg - Müllenbach - Kempenich - Bad Neuenahr-Ahrweiler - Bad Bodendorf - Sinzig

== Sources ==
- Eifelführer, Eifelverein e.V., 37. Auflage, 1995
