= Berscheid (disambiguation) =

Berscheid may refer to:

- Berscheid, a municipality in Germany
- Ellen S. Berscheid (1936–2025), American social psychologist
- Jessica Berscheid (born 1997), Luxembourgish footballer
