= Alsdorf (disambiguation) =

Alsdorf may refer to the following places in Germany:

- Alsdorf, a town in the district of Aachen, North Rhine-Westphalia
- Alsdorf, Altenkirchen, a municipality in the district of Altenkirchen, Rhineland-Palatinate
- Alsdorf, Bitburg-Prüm, a municipality in the district of Bitburg-Prüm, Rhineland-Palatinate
