= Baustert =

- Municipality
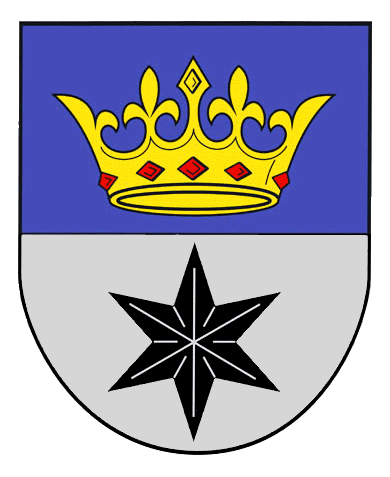
- Coat of arms

- Location of Baustert within Eifelkreis Bitburg-Prüm district
- Interactive map of Baustert
- Location within Germany Location within Rhineland-Palatinate
- Coordinates: 49°58′41.72″N 06°23′24.13″E
- Country: Germany
- State: Rhineland-Palatinate
- District: Eifelkreis Bitburg-Prüm
- Municipal assoc.: Bitburger Land
- Subdivisions: 2

Government
  - Mayor (2019–24): Udo Brück

Area
  - Total: 4.48 km^{2} (1.73 sq mi)
- Elevation: 300 m (980 ft)

Population (2025-12-31)
  - Total: 418
  - Density: 93.3/km^{2} (242/sq mi)
- Time zone: UTC+01:00 (CET)
  - Summer (DST): UTC+02:00 (CEST)
- Postal codes: 54636
- Dialling codes: 06564
- Vehicle registration: BIT
- Website: www.baustert.de

Baustert is a municipality in the district of Bitburg-Prüm, in Rhineland-Palatinate, western Germany.
