= Hüttingen bei Lahr =

- Municipality
- Location of Hüttingen bei Lahr within Eifelkreis Bitburg-Prüm district
- Interactive map of Hüttingen bei Lahr
- Location within Germany Location within Rhineland-Palatinate
- Coordinates: 49°55′50″N 6°17′48″E
- Country: Germany
- State: Rhineland-Palatinate
- District: Eifelkreis Bitburg-Prüm
- Municipal assoc.: Südeifel

Government
  - Mayor (2019–24): Günter Müller

Area
  - Total: 4.40 km^{2} (1.70 sq mi)
- Elevation: 278 m (912 ft)

Population (2025-12-31)
  - Total: 151
  - Density: 34.3/km^{2} (88.9/sq mi)
- Time zone: UTC+01:00 (CET)
  - Summer (DST): UTC+02:00 (CEST)
- Postal codes: 54675
- Dialling codes: 06566
- Vehicle registration: BIT

Hüttingen bei Lahr (German pronunciation: [ˌhʏtɪŋən baɪ ˈlaːɐ̯]; English: Hüttingen near Lahr) is a municipality in the district of Bitburg-Prüm, in Rhineland-Palatinate, western Germany.

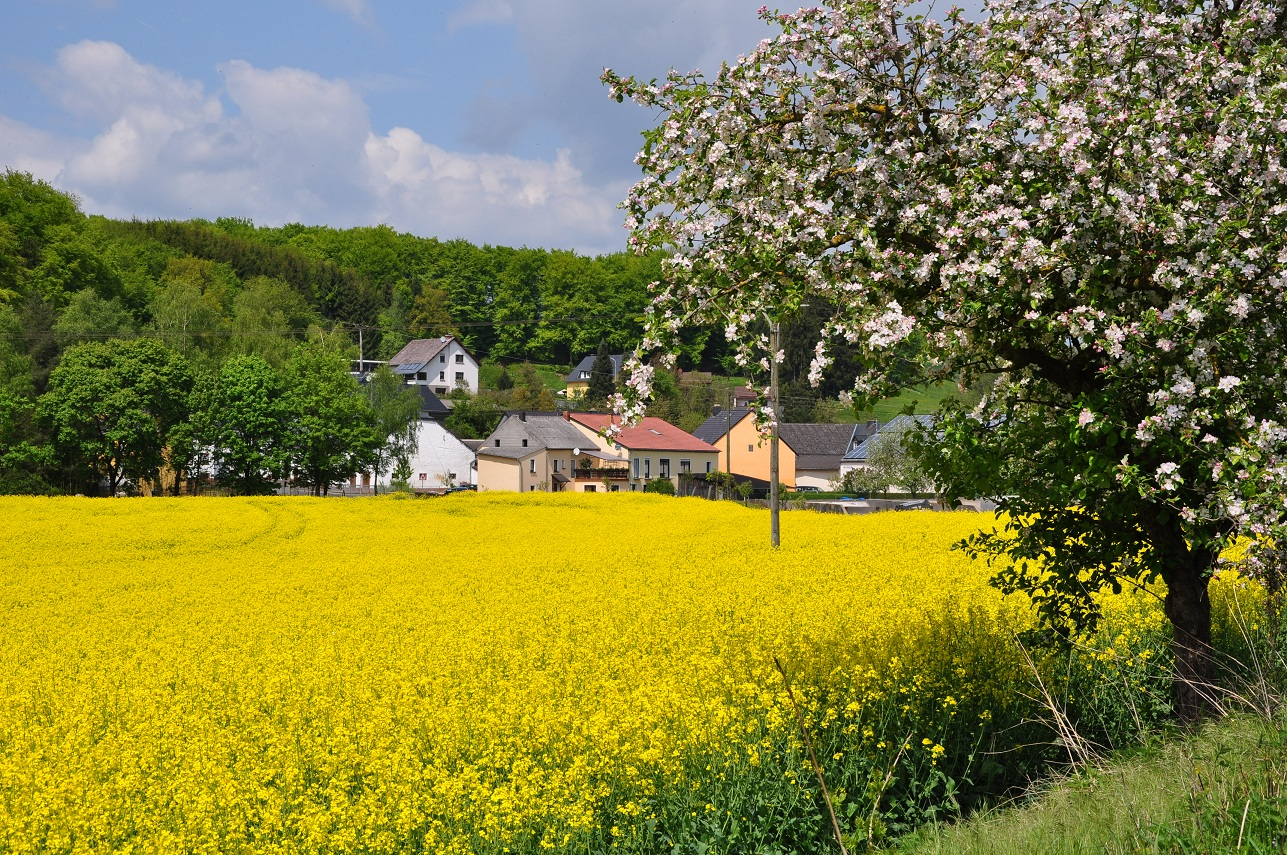
Spring in Hüttingen bei Lahr

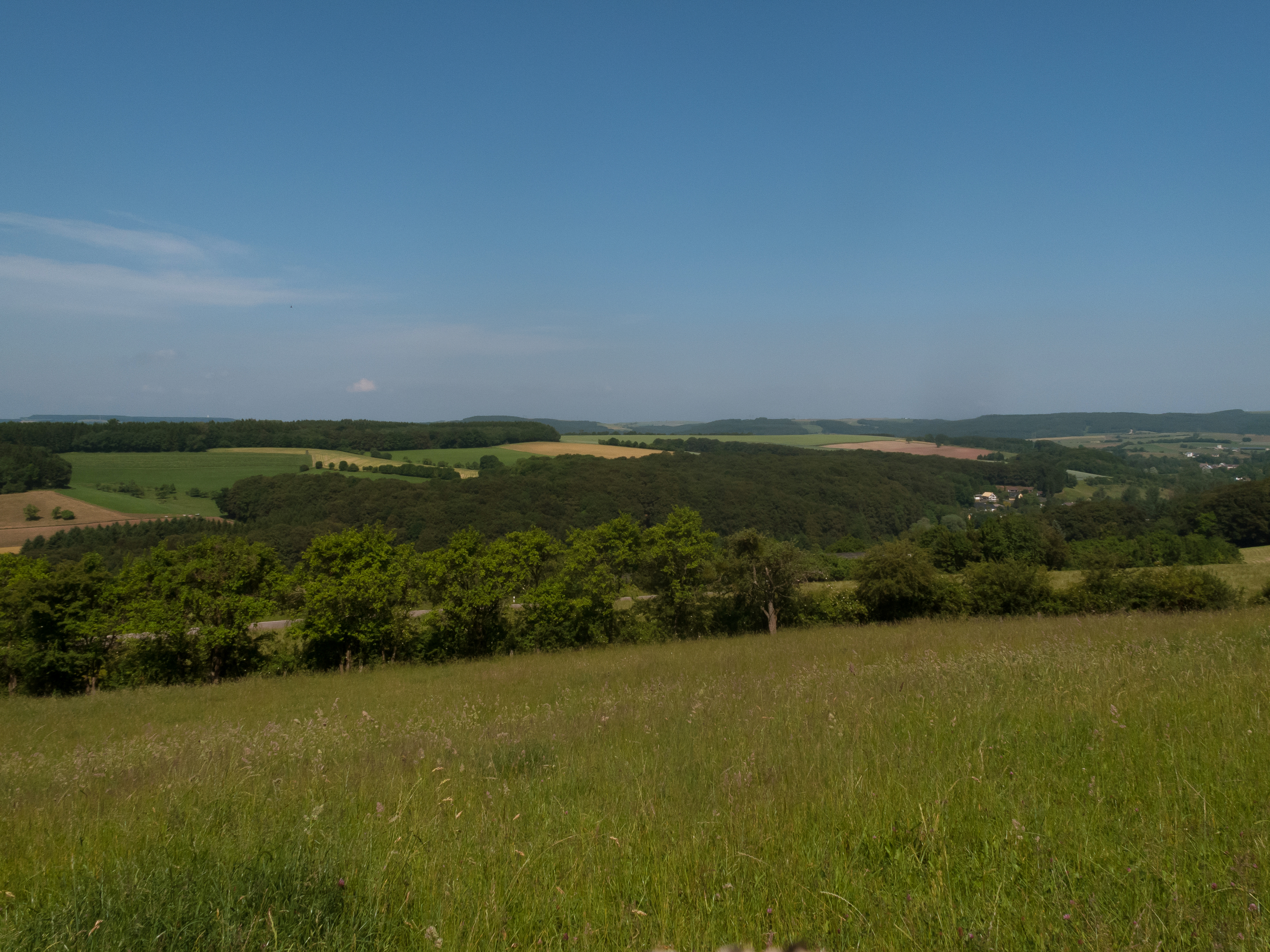
Panorama between Hüttingen and Hommerdingen
