= Steinborn, Bitburg-Prüm =

- Municipality
- Coat of arms

- Location of Steinborn, Bitburg-Prüm within Eifelkreis Bitburg-Prüm district
- Interactive map of Steinborn, Bitburg-Prüm
- Location within Germany Location within Rhineland-Palatinate
- Coordinates: 50°04′10″N 6°37′48″E
- Country: Germany
- State: Rhineland-Palatinate
- District: Eifelkreis Bitburg-Prüm
- Municipal assoc.: Bitburger Land

Government
  - Mayor (2019–24): Manfred Jegen

Area
  - Total: 11.29 km^{2} (4.36 sq mi)
- Elevation: 501 m (1,644 ft)

Population (2025-12-31)
  - Total: 170
  - Density: 15/km^{2} (39/sq mi)
- Time zone: UTC+01:00 (CET)
  - Summer (DST): UTC+02:00 (CEST)
- Postal codes: 54655
- Dialling codes: 06567
- Vehicle registration: BIT
- Website: www.ortsgemeinde-steinborn.de

Steinborn is a municipality in the district of Bitburg-Prüm, in Rhineland-Palatinate, western Germany.
