= Irrel =

- Municipality
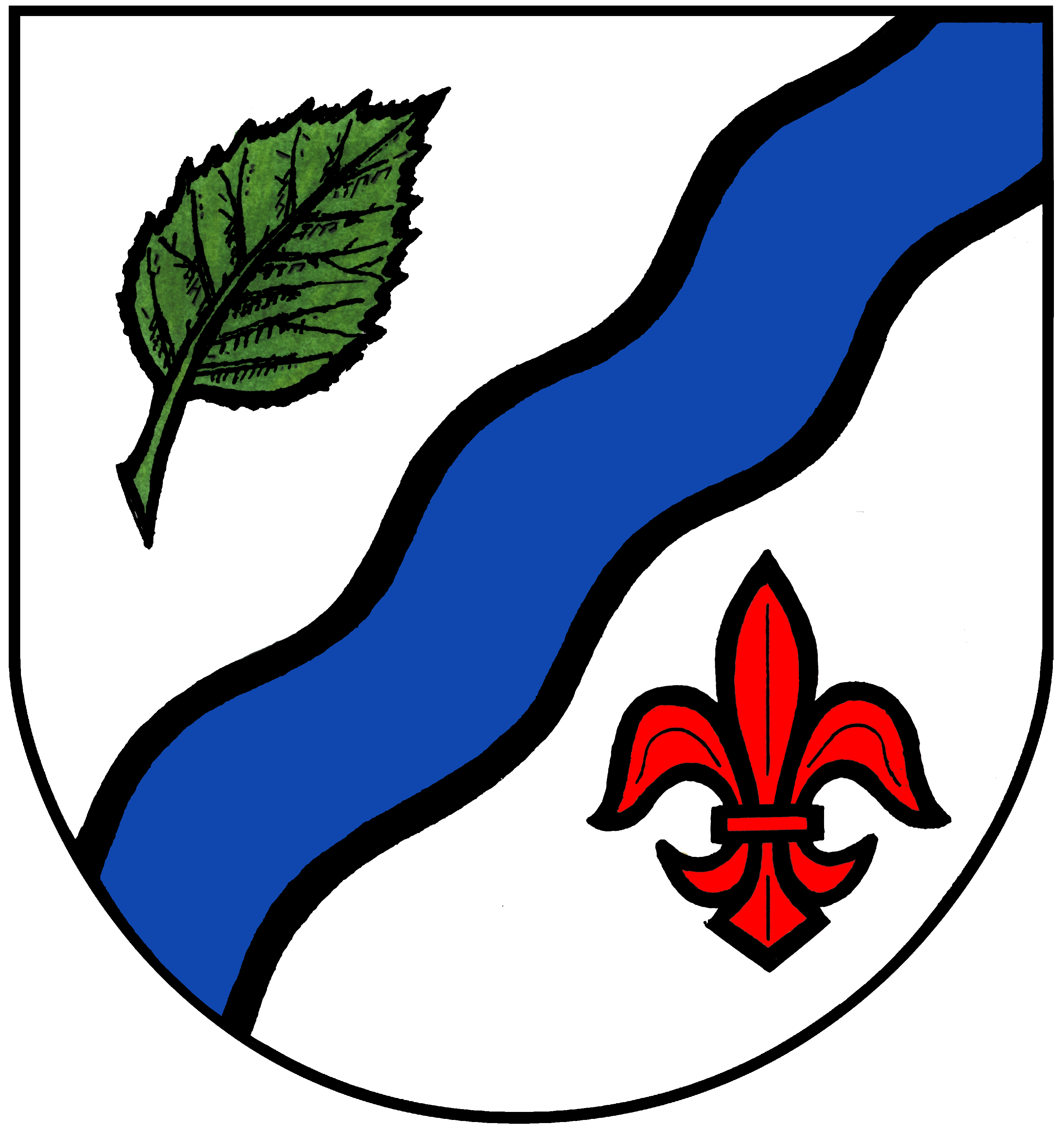
- Coat of arms

- Location of Irrel within Eifelkreis Bitburg-Prüm district
- Interactive map of Irrel
- Location within Germany Location within Rhineland-Palatinate
- Coordinates: 49°50′50″N 06°27′22″E
- Country: Germany
- State: Rhineland-Palatinate
- District: Eifelkreis Bitburg-Prüm
- Municipal assoc.: Südeifel

Government
  - Mayor (2019–24): Herbert Theis

Area
  - Total: 7.05 km^{2} (2.72 sq mi)
- Elevation: 170 m (560 ft)

Population (2025-12-31)
  - Total: 1,744
  - Density: 247/km^{2} (641/sq mi)
- Time zone: UTC+01:00 (CET)
  - Summer (DST): UTC+02:00 (CEST)
- Postal codes: 54666
- Dialling codes: 06525
- Vehicle registration: BIT
- Website: Irrel at site www.suedeifelinfo.de

Irrel (German pronunciation: [ˈɪʁl̩]) is a municipality in the district Bitburg-Prüm, in Rhineland-Palatinate, Germany. It is situated in the Eifel, near the border with Luxembourg, at the confluence of the rivers Prüm and Nims. It is located approximately 15 km south-west of Bitburg and 5 km north-east of Echternach.

Irrel was the seat of the former Verbandsgemeinde ("collective municipality") Irrel. Since 1 July 2014 it is part of the Verbandsgemeinde Südeifel.

== Sights ==
- Devil's Gorge
