= Südeifel (Verbandsgemeinde) =

- Verbandsgemeinde
- Location of Südeifel within Bitburg-Prüm district
- Interactive map of Südeifel
- Location within Germany Location within Rhineland-Palatinate
- Coordinates: 50°00′N 6°18′E
- Country: Germany
- State: Rhineland-Palatinate
- District: Bitburg-Prüm
- Seat: Neuerburg
- Subdivisions: 65 municipalities

Area
  - Total: 265.89 km^{2} (102.66 sq mi)

Population (2025-12-31)
  - Total: 19,224
  - Density: 72.301/km^{2} (187.26/sq mi)
- Time zone: UTC+01:00 (CET)
  - Summer (DST): UTC+02:00 (CEST)
- Website: www.vg-suedeifel.de

Südeifel is a Verbandsgemeinde ("collective municipality") in the district Bitburg-Prüm, in Rhineland-Palatinate, Germany. The seat of the Verbandsgemeinde is in Neuerburg. It was formed on 1 July 2014 by the merger of the former Verbandsgemeinden Irrel and Neuerburg.

The Verbandsgemeinde Südeifel consists of the following Ortsgemeinden ("local municipalities"):

1. Affler
2. Alsdorf
3. Altscheid
4. Ammeldingen an der Our
5. Ammeldingen bei Neuerburg
6. Bauler
7. Berkoth
8. Berscheid
9. Biesdorf
10. Bollendorf
11. Burg
12. Dauwelshausen
13. Echternacherbrück
14. Eisenach
15. Emmelbaum
16. Ernzen
17. Ferschweiler
18. Fischbach-Oberraden
19. Geichlingen
20. Gemünd
21. Gentingen
22. Gilzem
23. Heilbach
24. Herbstmühle
25. Holsthum
26. Hommerdingen
27. Hütten
28. Hüttingen bei Lahr
29. Irrel
30. Karlshausen
31. Kaschenbach
32. Keppeshausen
33. Körperich
34. Koxhausen
35. Kruchten
36. Lahr
37. Leimbach
38. Menningen
39. Mettendorf
40. Minden
41. Muxerath
42. Nasingen
43. Neuerburg
44. Niederraden
45. Niederweis
46. Niehl
47. Nusbaum
48. Obergeckler
49. Peffingen
50. Plascheid
51. Prümzurlay
52. Rodershausen
53. Roth an der Our
54. Schankweiler
55. Scheitenkorb
56. Scheuern
57. Sevenig bei Neuerburg
58. Sinspelt
59. Übereisenbach
60. Uppershausen
61. Utscheid
62. Waldhof-Falkenstein
63. Wallendorf
64. Weidingen
65. Zweifelscheid
