= Scheuern =

- Municipality
- Location of Scheuern within Eifelkreis Bitburg-Prüm district
- Interactive map of Scheuern
- Location within Germany Location within Rhineland-Palatinate
- Coordinates: 50°01′20″N 6°18′25″E
- Country: Germany
- State: Rhineland-Palatinate
- District: Eifelkreis Bitburg-Prüm
- Municipal assoc.: Südeifel

Government
  - Mayor: Werner Koos

Area
  - Total: 6.48 km^{2} (2.50 sq mi)
- Elevation: 509 m (1,670 ft)

Population (2025-12-31)
  - Total: 32
  - Density: 4.9/km^{2} (13/sq mi)
- Time zone: UTC+01:00 (CET)
  - Summer (DST): UTC+02:00 (CEST)
- Postal codes: 54673
- Dialling codes: 06564
- Vehicle registration: BIT
- Website: vg-suedeifel.de

Scheuern (German pronunciation: [ˈʃɔɪ̯ɐn]) is a municipality in the district of Bitburg-Prüm, in Rhineland-Palatinate, western Germany.
