= Hütten, Rhineland-Palatinate =

Hütten
- Municipality
- Location of Hütten within Eifelkreis Bitburg-Prüm district
- Interactive map of Hütten
- Location within Germany Location within Rhineland-Palatinate
- Coordinates: 50°00′50″N 6°15′12″E
- Country: Germany
- State: Rhineland-Palatinate
- District: Eifelkreis Bitburg-Prüm
- Municipal assoc.: Südeifel

Government
  - Mayor (2019–24): Hermann Schoos

Area
  - Total: 3.1 km^{2} (1.2 sq mi)
- Elevation: 500 m (1,600 ft)

Population (2025-12-31)
  - Total: 49
  - Density: 16/km^{2} (41/sq mi)
- Time zone: UTC+01:00 (CET)
  - Summer (DST): UTC+02:00 (CEST)
- Postal codes: 54673
- Dialling codes: 06564
- Vehicle registration: BIT
- Website: Hütten at site www.suedeifelinfo.de

Hütten (German pronunciation: [ˈhʏtn̩]) is a municipality in the district of Bitburg-Prüm, in Rhineland-Palatinate, western Germany.
