= Muxerath =

- Municipality
- Location of Muxerath within Eifelkreis Bitburg-Prüm district
- Interactive map of Muxerath
- Location within Germany Location within Rhineland-Palatinate
- Coordinates: 49°59′30″N 06°16′12″E
- Country: Germany
- State: Rhineland-Palatinate
- District: Eifelkreis Bitburg-Prüm
- Municipal assoc.: Südeifel

Government
  - Mayor (2019–24): Rudolf Bretz

Area
  - Total: 4.54 km^{2} (1.75 sq mi)
- Elevation: 512 m (1,680 ft)

Population (2025-12-31)
  - Total: 40
  - Density: 8.8/km^{2} (23/sq mi)
- Time zone: UTC+01:00 (CET)
  - Summer (DST): UTC+02:00 (CEST)
- Postal codes: 54673
- Dialling codes: 06564
- Vehicle registration: BIT
- Website: Muxerath at site www.suedeifelinfo.de

Muxerath is a municipality in the district of Bitburg-Prüm, in Rhineland-Palatinate, western Germany.
