= Bauler, Bitburg-Prüm =

Bauler
- Municipality
- Location of Bauler within Eifelkreis Bitburg-Prüm district
- Interactive map of Bauler
- Location within Germany Location within Rhineland-Palatinate
- Coordinates: 49°57′54″N 06°12′26″E
- Country: Germany
- State: Rhineland-Palatinate
- District: Eifelkreis Bitburg-Prüm
- Municipal assoc.: Südeifel

Government
  - Mayor (2019–24): Marianne Milbert

Area
  - Total: 6.03 km^{2} (2.33 sq mi)
- Elevation: 445 m (1,460 ft)

Population (2025-12-31)
  - Total: 83
  - Density: 14/km^{2} (36/sq mi)
- Time zone: UTC+01:00 (CET)
  - Summer (DST): UTC+02:00 (CEST)
- Postal codes: 54673
- Dialling codes: 06524
- Vehicle registration: BIT
- Website: Bauler at website www.suedeifelinfo.de

Bauler (German pronunciation: [ˈbaʊlɐ]) is a municipality in the district of Bitburg-Prüm, in Rhineland-Palatinate, western Germany.
