= Fischbach-Oberraden =

- Municipality
- Location of Fischbach-Oberraden within Eifelkreis Bitburg-Prüm district
- Interactive map of Fischbach-Oberraden
- Location within Germany Location within Rhineland-Palatinate
- Coordinates: 50°00′01″N 06°20′06″E
- Country: Germany
- State: Rhineland-Palatinate
- District: Eifelkreis Bitburg-Prüm
- Municipal assoc.: Südeifel
- Subdivisions: 2

Government
  - Mayor (2019–24): Egon Thielen

Area
  - Total: 6.67 km^{2} (2.58 sq mi)
- Elevation: 314 m (1,030 ft)

Population (2025-12-31)
  - Total: 44
  - Density: 6.6/km^{2} (17/sq mi)
- Time zone: UTC+01:00 (CET)
  - Summer (DST): UTC+02:00 (CEST)
- Postal codes: 54675
- Dialling codes: 06564
- Vehicle registration: BIT
- Website: Fischbach-Oberraden at site www.suedeifelinfo.de

Fischbach-Oberraden is a municipality in the district of Bitburg-Prüm, in Rhineland-Palatinate, western Germany.
