= Eisenach, Rhineland-Palatinate =

Eisenach
- Municipality
- Coat of arms

- Location of Eisenach within Eifelkreis Bitburg-Prüm district
- Interactive map of Eisenach
- Location within Germany Location within Rhineland-Palatinate
- Coordinates: 49°51′08″N 06°30′32″E
- Country: Germany
- State: Rhineland-Palatinate
- District: Eifelkreis Bitburg-Prüm
- Municipal assoc.: Südeifel

Government
  - Mayor (2019–24): Jürgen Kockelmann

Area
  - Total: 6.31 km^{2} (2.44 sq mi)
- Elevation: 275–416 m (902–1,365 ft)

Population (2025-12-31)
  - Total: 398
  - Density: 63.1/km^{2} (163/sq mi)
- Time zone: UTC+01:00 (CET)
  - Summer (DST): UTC+02:00 (CEST)
- Postal codes: 54298
- Dialling codes: 06506
- Vehicle registration: BIT
- Website: eisenach-eifel.de

Eisenach (German pronunciation: [ˈaɪzənax]) is a municipality in the district of Bitburg-Prüm, in Rhineland-Palatinate, western Germany.
