= Altscheid =

- Municipality
- Location of Altscheid within Eifelkreis Bitburg-Prüm district
- Interactive map of Altscheid
- Location within Germany Location within Rhineland-Palatinate
- Coordinates: 50°01′10″N 06°23′33″E
- Country: Germany
- State: Rhineland-Palatinate
- District: Eifelkreis Bitburg-Prüm
- Municipal assoc.: Südeifel

Government
  - Mayor (2019–24): Lothar Theisen

Area
  - Total: 5.89 km^{2} (2.27 sq mi)
- Elevation: 426 m (1,398 ft)

Population (2025-12-31)
  - Total: 88
  - Density: 15/km^{2} (39/sq mi)
- Time zone: UTC+01:00 (CET)
  - Summer (DST): UTC+02:00 (CEST)
- Postal codes: 54636
- Dialling codes: 06527
- Vehicle registration: BIT
- Website: Altscheid at site www.suedeifelinfo.de

Altscheid is a municipality in the district of Bitburg-Prüm, in Rhineland-Palatinate, western Germany.

== Geography ==
The municipal area is partly in the German-Luxembourg Nature Park.

Birkendell and part of Neumühle belong to Altscheid.

The neighboring communities are Weidingen and Wißmannsdorf.
