= Uppershausen =

- Municipality
- Location of Uppershausen within Eifelkreis Bitburg-Prüm district
- Interactive map of Uppershausen
- Location within Germany Location within Rhineland-Palatinate
- Coordinates: 50°2′47″N 6°18′57″E
- Country: Germany
- State: Rhineland-Palatinate
- District: Eifelkreis Bitburg-Prüm
- Municipal assoc.: Südeifel

Government
  - Mayor (2019–24): Alfred Weires

Area
  - Total: 3.40 km^{2} (1.31 sq mi)
- Elevation: 515 m (1,690 ft)

Population (2025-12-31)
  - Total: 59
  - Density: 17/km^{2} (45/sq mi)
- Time zone: UTC+01:00 (CET)
  - Summer (DST): UTC+02:00 (CEST)
- Postal codes: 54673
- Dialling codes: 06564
- Vehicle registration: BIT
- Website: Uppershausen at website www.suedeifelinfo.de

Uppershausen is a municipality in the district of Bitburg-Prüm, in Rhineland-Palatinate, western Germany.
