= Nasingen =

- Municipality
- Location of Nasingen within Eifelkreis Bitburg-Prüm district
- Interactive map of Nasingen
- Location within Germany Location within Rhineland-Palatinate
- Coordinates: 49°58′43″N 06°15′39″E
- Country: Germany
- State: Rhineland-Palatinate
- District: Eifelkreis Bitburg-Prüm
- Municipal assoc.: Südeifel

Government
  - Mayor (2019–24): Hanna Weires

Area
  - Total: 2.38 km^{2} (0.92 sq mi)
- Elevation: 483 m (1,585 ft)

Population (2025-12-31)
  - Total: 45
  - Density: 19/km^{2} (49/sq mi)
- Time zone: UTC+01:00 (CET)
  - Summer (DST): UTC+02:00 (CEST)
- Postal codes: 54673
- Dialling codes: 06564
- Vehicle registration: BIT
- Website: Nasingen at site www.suedeifelinfo.de

Nasingen is a municipality in the district of Bitburg-Prüm, in Rhineland-Palatinate, western Germany.
