= Affler =

- Municipality
- Location of Affler within Eifelkreis Bitburg-Prüm district
- Interactive map of Affler
- Location within Germany Location within Rhineland-Palatinate
- Coordinates: 50°00′51″N 06°09′12″E
- Country: Germany
- State: Rhineland-Palatinate
- District: Eifelkreis Bitburg-Prüm
- Municipal assoc.: Südeifel

Government
  - Mayor (2019–24): Herbert Steins

Area
  - Total: 1.99 km^{2} (0.77 sq mi)
- Elevation: 404 m (1,325 ft)

Population (2025-12-31)
  - Total: 29
  - Density: 15/km^{2} (38/sq mi)
- Time zone: UTC+01:00 (CET)
  - Summer (DST): UTC+02:00 (CEST)
- Postal codes: 54689
- Dialling codes: 06524
- Vehicle registration: BIT
- Website: Affler at site www.suedeifelinfo.de

Affler is a municipality in the district of Bitburg-Prüm, in Rhineland-Palatinate, western Germany.

== Geography ==
Affler is located in the West Eifel, south of Dasburg and above the Our, near the border with Luxembourg.

== History ==
In October 1795, the French Republic annexed the Austrian Netherlands, which included the Grand-Duchy of Luxembourg. Under the French administration, the area belonged to the canton of Clervaux in the district of Diekirch, department of Forêts. In 1815, due to the resolutions of the Congress of Vienna, the former Luxembourg area east of the Sauer and Our was assigned to the Kingdom of Prussia.

The population of Affler from 1815 to 2014, based on census:

Year	Population
1815	25
1835	56
1871	77
1905	80
1939	290
1950	60

Year	Population
1961	60
1970	56
1987	46
1997	32
2005	30
2025	29

== Religion ==
The community has a small chapel, built in 1887, which holds occasional services. At the end of a tunnel (in which the inhabitants of the village hid for three weeks in 1944) in the nearby forest stands a small statue of Mary. It was built in gratitude that the American bombings in September 1944 killed none of the inhabitants of Affler.
