= Kaschenbach =

- Municipality
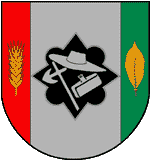
- Coat of arms

- Location of Kaschenbach within Eifelkreis Bitburg-Prüm district
- Interactive map of Kaschenbach
- Location within Germany Location within Rhineland-Palatinate
- Coordinates: 49°52′36″N 06°28′46″E
- Country: Germany
- State: Rhineland-Palatinate
- District: Eifelkreis Bitburg-Prüm
- Municipal assoc.: Südeifel

Government
  - Mayor (2019–24): Johannes Billen

Area
  - Total: 4.45 km^{2} (1.72 sq mi)
- Elevation: 280 m (920 ft)

Population (2025-12-31)
  - Total: 65
  - Density: 15/km^{2} (38/sq mi)
- Time zone: UTC+01:00 (CET)
  - Summer (DST): UTC+02:00 (CEST)
- Postal codes: 54668
- Dialling codes: 06568
- Vehicle registration: BIT
- Website: Kaschenbach at site www.suedeifelinfo.de

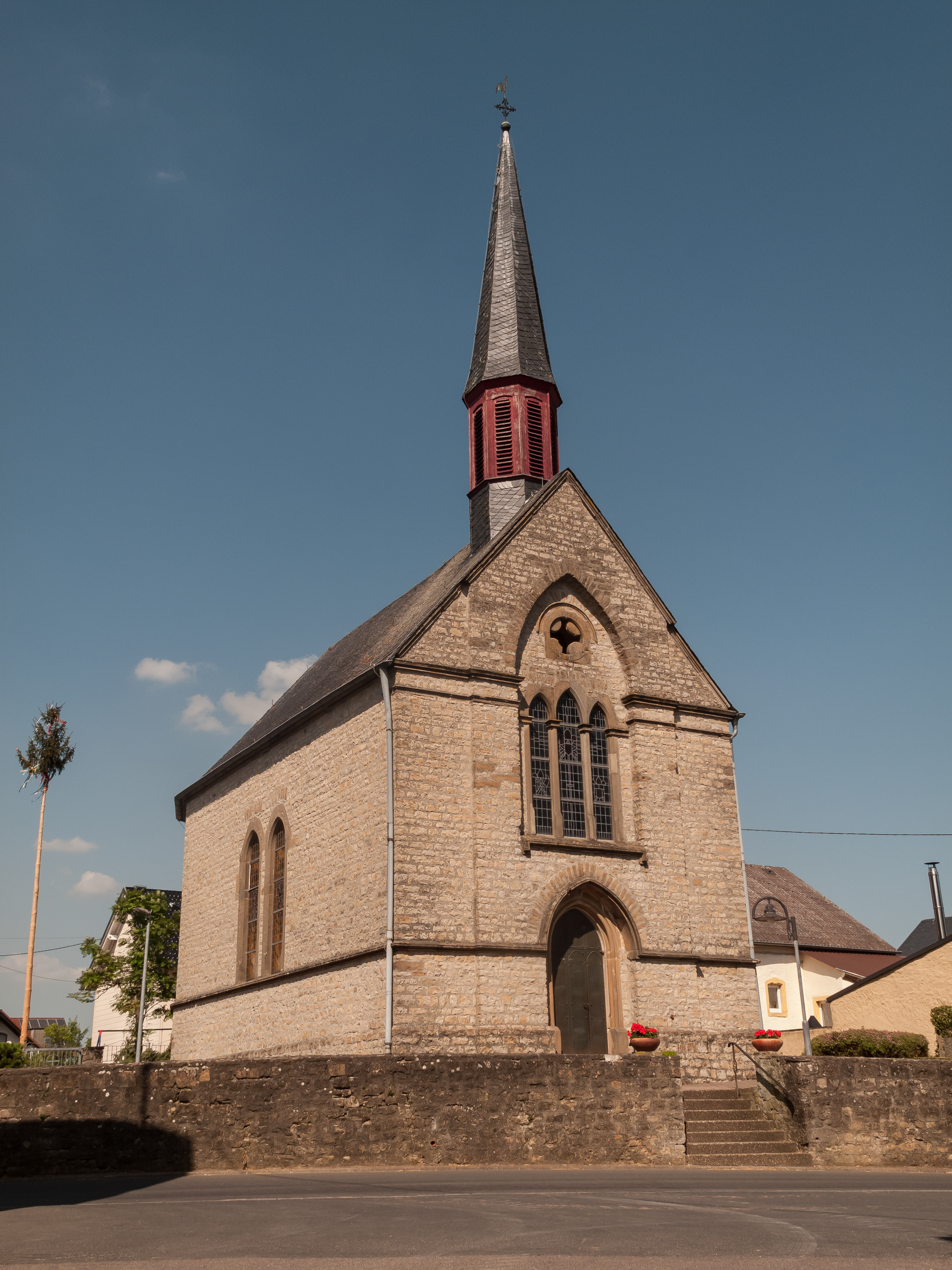
Kaschenbach, Catholic subsidiary church Sankt Michael

Kaschenbach is a municipality in the district of Bitburg-Prüm, in Rhineland-Palatinate, western Germany.
