= Ferschweiler =

- Municipality
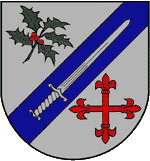
- Coat of arms

- Location of Ferschweiler within Eifelkreis Bitburg-Prüm district
- Interactive map of Ferschweiler
- Location within Germany Location within Rhineland-Palatinate
- Coordinates: 49°51′47″N 06°24′15″E
- Country: Germany
- State: Rhineland-Palatinate
- District: Eifelkreis Bitburg-Prüm
- Municipal assoc.: Südeifel

Government
  - Mayor (2019–24): Rudolf Schmitt

Area
  - Total: 7.41 km^{2} (2.86 sq mi)
- Elevation: 345 m (1,132 ft)

Population (2025-12-31)
  - Total: 1,020
  - Density: 138/km^{2} (357/sq mi)
- Time zone: UTC+01:00 (CET)
  - Summer (DST): UTC+02:00 (CEST)
- Postal codes: 54668
- Dialling codes: 06523
- Vehicle registration: BIT
- Website: www.ferschweiler.de

Ferschweiler is a municipality in the district of Bitburg-Prüm, in Rhineland-Palatinate, western Germany.

== Notable people ==
- Henri Tudor - engineer, inventor and industrialist
