= Niehl =

- Municipality
- Location of Niehl within Eifelkreis Bitburg-Prüm district
- Interactive map of Niehl
- Location within Germany Location within Rhineland-Palatinate
- Coordinates: 49°57′23″N 06°21′50″E
- Country: Germany
- State: Rhineland-Palatinate
- District: Eifelkreis Bitburg-Prüm
- Municipal assoc.: Südeifel

Government
  - Mayor (2019–24): Christian Dichter

Area
  - Total: 1.99 km^{2} (0.77 sq mi)
- Elevation: 329 m (1,079 ft)

Population (2025-12-31)
  - Total: 66
  - Density: 33/km^{2} (86/sq mi)
- Time zone: UTC+01:00 (CET)
  - Summer (DST): UTC+02:00 (CEST)
- Postal codes: 54646
- Dialling codes: 06522
- Vehicle registration: BIT
- Website: Niehl at site www.suedeifelinfo.de

Niehl (German pronunciation: [niːl]) is a municipality in the district of Bitburg-Prüm, in Rhineland-Palatinate, western Germany.
