= Sevenig (Our) =

- Municipality
- Location of Sevenig within Eifelkreis Bitburg-Prüm district
- Interactive map of Sevenig
- Location within Germany Location within Rhineland-Palatinate
- Coordinates: 50°07′46″N 6°09′54″E
- Country: Germany
- State: Rhineland-Palatinate
- District: Eifelkreis Bitburg-Prüm
- Municipal assoc.: Arzfeld

Government
  - Mayor (2019–24): Helmut Nelles

Area
  - Total: 4.81 km^{2} (1.86 sq mi)
- Elevation: 470 m (1,540 ft)

Population (2025-12-31)
  - Total: 39
  - Density: 8.1/km^{2} (21/sq mi)
- Time zone: UTC+01:00 (CET)
  - Summer (DST): UTC+02:00 (CEST)
- Postal codes: 54673
- Dialling codes: 06559
- Vehicle registration: BIT
- Website: www.sevenig-our.de

Sevenig (Our) (German pronunciation: [ˈzeːvənɪç]) is a municipality in the district of Bitburg-Prüm, in Rhineland-Palatinate, western Germany.
