= Peffingen =

- Municipality
- Coat of arms

- Location of Peffingen within Eifelkreis Bitburg-Prüm district
- Interactive map of Peffingen
- Location within Germany Location within Rhineland-Palatinate
- Coordinates: 49°54′38″N 06°24′24″E
- Country: Germany
- State: Rhineland-Palatinate
- District: Eifelkreis Bitburg-Prüm
- Municipal assoc.: Südeifel

Area
  - Total: 5.80 km^{2} (2.24 sq mi)
- Elevation: 198 m (650 ft)

Population (2025-12-31)
  - Total: 218
  - Density: 37.6/km^{2} (97.3/sq mi)
- Time zone: UTC+01:00 (CET)
  - Summer (DST): UTC+02:00 (CEST)
- Postal codes: 54668
- Dialling codes: 06523
- Vehicle registration: BIT
- Website: Peffingen at site www.suedeifelinfo.de

Peffingen is a municipality in the district of Bitburg-Prüm, in Rhineland-Palatinate, western Germany.
