= Koxhausen =

- Municipality
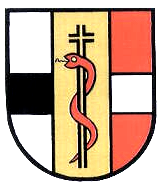
- Coat of arms

- Location of Koxhausen within Eifelkreis Bitburg-Prüm district
- Interactive map of Koxhausen
- Location within Germany Location within Rhineland-Palatinate
- Coordinates: 49°59′42″N 6°14′44″E
- Country: Germany
- State: Rhineland-Palatinate
- District: Eifelkreis Bitburg-Prüm
- Municipal assoc.: Südeifel

Government
  - Mayor (2019–24): Rita Enders

Area
  - Total: 3.81 km^{2} (1.47 sq mi)
- Elevation: 510 m (1,670 ft)

Population (2025-12-31)
  - Total: 89
  - Density: 23/km^{2} (61/sq mi)
- Time zone: UTC+01:00 (CET)
  - Summer (DST): UTC+02:00 (CEST)
- Postal codes: 54673
- Dialling codes: 06564
- Vehicle registration: BIT
- Website: Koxhausen at site www.suedeifelinfo.de

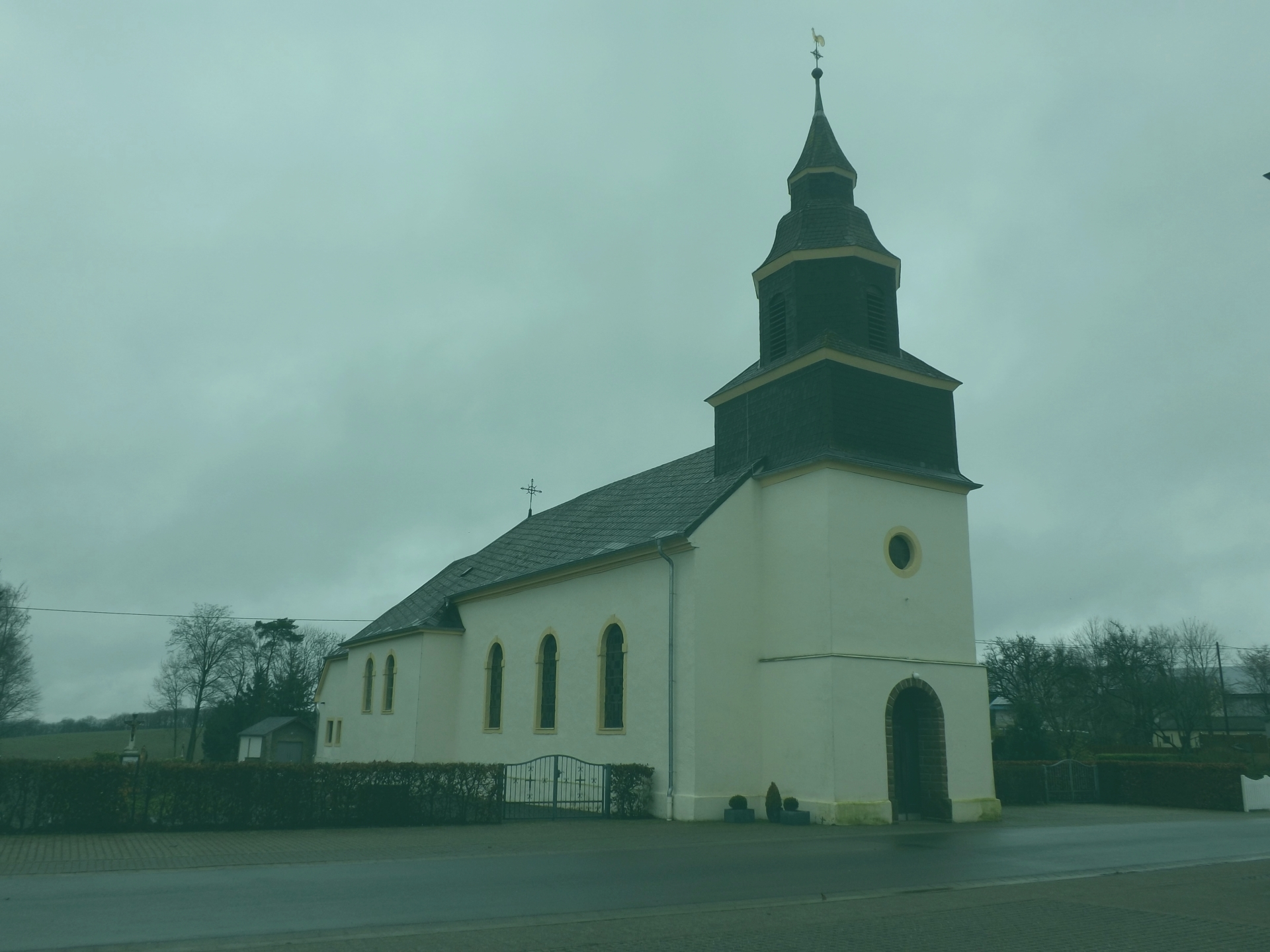
Church St. Cosmas und Damian

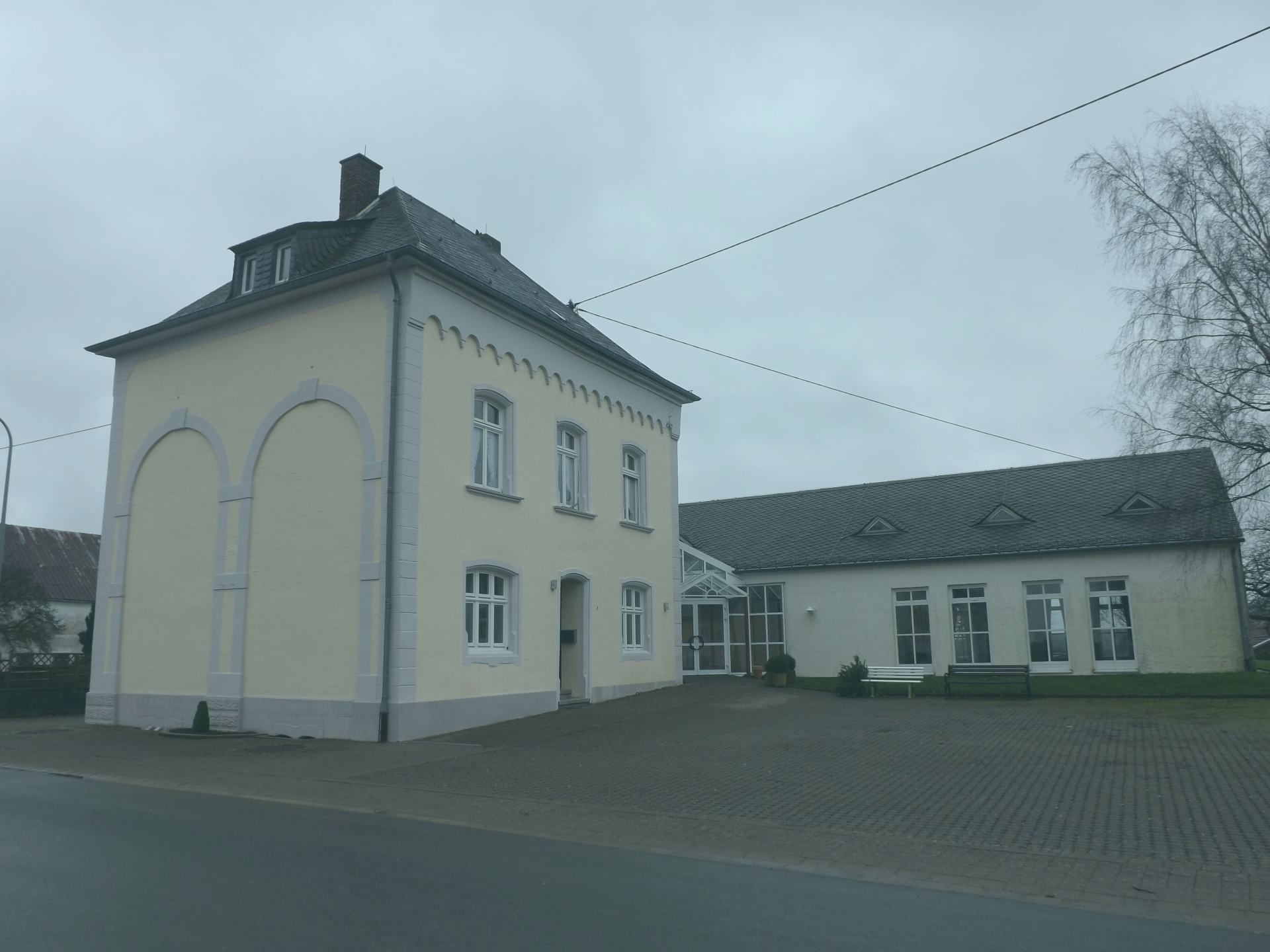
Old rectory and adjacent parish hall

Koxhausen is a municipality in the district of Bitburg-Prüm, in Rhineland-Palatinate, western Germany.
