= Scheitenkorb =

- Municipality
- Location of Scheitenkorb within Eifelkreis Bitburg-Prüm district
- Interactive map of Scheitenkorb
- Location within Germany Location within Rhineland-Palatinate
- Coordinates: 50°00′25″N 06°12′36″E
- Country: Germany
- State: Rhineland-Palatinate
- District: Eifelkreis Bitburg-Prüm
- Municipal assoc.: Südeifel

Government
  - Mayor (2019–24): Arnold Kotz

Area
  - Total: 2.82 km^{2} (1.09 sq mi)
- Elevation: 483 m (1,585 ft)

Population (2025-12-31)
  - Total: 26
  - Density: 9.2/km^{2} (24/sq mi)
- Time zone: UTC+01:00 (CET)
  - Summer (DST): UTC+02:00 (CEST)
- Postal codes: 54673
- Dialling codes: 06524
- Vehicle registration: BIT
- Website: alt.vg-neuerburg.de

Scheitenkorb is a municipality in the district of Bitburg-Prüm, in Rhineland-Palatinate, western Germany.
