= Ammeldingen bei Neuerburg =

- Municipality
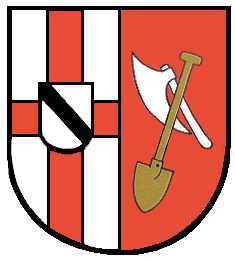
- Coat of arms

- Location of Ammeldingen bei Neuerburg within Eifelkreis Bitburg-Prüm district
- Interactive map of Ammeldingen bei Neuerburg
- Location within Germany Location within Rhineland-Palatinate
- Coordinates: 50°02′54″N 06°16′30″E
- Country: Germany
- State: Rhineland-Palatinate
- District: Eifelkreis Bitburg-Prüm
- Municipal assoc.: Südeifel

Government
  - Mayor (2019–24): Rudolf Mayer

Area
  - Total: 4.49 km^{2} (1.73 sq mi)
- Elevation: 500 m (1,600 ft)

Population (2025-12-31)
  - Total: 246
  - Density: 54.8/km^{2} (142/sq mi)
- Time zone: UTC+01:00 (CET)
  - Summer (DST): UTC+02:00 (CEST)
- Postal codes: 54673
- Dialling codes: 06564
- Vehicle registration: BIT
- Website: Ammeldingen bei Neuerburg at site www.suedeifelinfo.de

Ammeldingen bei Neuerburg (German pronunciation: [ˈaml̩dɪŋən baɪ ˈnɔʏɐbʊʁk], lit. 'Ammeldingen near Neuerburg') is a municipality in the district of Bitburg-Prüm, in Rhineland-Palatinate, western Germany.
