= Rodershausen =

- Municipality
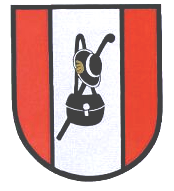
- Coat of arms

- Location of Rodershausen within Eifelkreis Bitburg-Prüm district
- Interactive map of Rodershausen
- Location within Germany Location within Rhineland-Palatinate
- Coordinates: 49°59′37″N 6°11′53″E
- Country: Germany
- State: Rhineland-Palatinate
- District: Eifelkreis Bitburg-Prüm
- Municipal assoc.: Südeifel

Government
  - Mayor (2019–24): Matthias Lorig

Area
  - Total: 5.36 km^{2} (2.07 sq mi)
- Elevation: 500 m (1,600 ft)

Population (2025-12-31)
  - Total: 154
  - Density: 28.7/km^{2} (74.4/sq mi)
- Time zone: UTC+01:00 (CET)
  - Summer (DST): UTC+02:00 (CEST)
- Postal codes: 54673
- Dialling codes: 06524
- Vehicle registration: BIT
- Website: Rodershausen at site www.suedeifelinfo.de

Rodershausen is a municipality in the district of Bitburg-Prüm, in Rhineland-Palatinate, western Germany.
