= Niederraden =

- Municipality
- Location of Niederraden within Eifelkreis Bitburg-Prüm district
- Interactive map of Niederraden
- Location within Germany Location within Rhineland-Palatinate
- Coordinates: 49°58′55″N 06°19′43″E
- Country: Germany
- State: Rhineland-Palatinate
- District: Eifelkreis Bitburg-Prüm
- Municipal assoc.: Südeifel

Government
  - Mayor (2019–24): Jörg Steffen

Area
  - Total: 2.00 km^{2} (0.77 sq mi)
- Elevation: 311 m (1,020 ft)

Population (2025-12-31)
  - Total: 48
  - Density: 24/km^{2} (62/sq mi)
- Time zone: UTC+01:00 (CET)
  - Summer (DST): UTC+02:00 (CEST)
- Postal codes: 54675
- Dialling codes: 06522
- Vehicle registration: BIT
- Website: Niederraden at site www.suedeifelinfo.de

Niederraden is a municipality in the district of Bitburg-Prüm, in Rhineland-Palatinate, western Germany.
