= Keppeshausen =

- Municipality
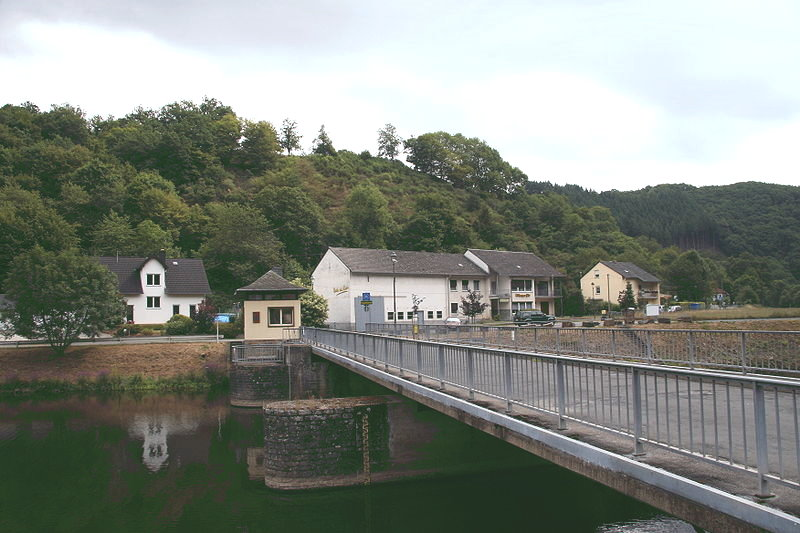

- Location of Keppeshausen within Eifelkreis Bitburg-Prüm district
- Interactive map of Keppeshausen
- Location within Germany Location within Rhineland-Palatinate
- Coordinates: 49°57′48″N 06°10′14″E
- Country: Germany
- State: Rhineland-Palatinate
- District: Eifelkreis Bitburg-Prüm
- Municipal assoc.: Südeifel

Government
  - Mayor (2019–24): Eduard Klasen

Area
  - Total: 2.31 km^{2} (0.89 sq mi)
- Elevation: 230 m (750 ft)

Population (2025-12-31)
  - Total: 13
  - Density: 5.6/km^{2} (15/sq mi)
- Time zone: UTC+01:00 (CET)
  - Summer (DST): UTC+02:00 (CEST)
- Postal codes: 54673
- Dialling codes: 06524
- Vehicle registration: BIT
- Website: Keppeshausen at site www.suedeifelinfo.de

Keppeshausen is a municipality in the district of Bitburg-Prüm, in Rhineland-Palatinate, western Germany.
