= Gilzem =

- Municipality
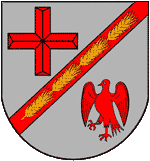
- Coat of arms

- Location of Gilzem within Eifelkreis Bitburg-Prüm district
- Interactive map of Gilzem
- Location within Germany Location within Rhineland-Palatinate
- Coordinates: 49°52′07″N 6°31′10″E
- Country: Germany
- State: Rhineland-Palatinate
- District: Eifelkreis Bitburg-Prüm
- Municipal assoc.: Südeifel

Government
  - Mayor (2019–24): Martina Thies

Area
  - Total: 4.98 km^{2} (1.92 sq mi)
- Elevation: 320–410 m (1,050–1,350 ft)

Population (2025-12-31)
  - Total: 433
  - Density: 86.9/km^{2} (225/sq mi)
- Time zone: UTC+01:00 (CET)
  - Summer (DST): UTC+02:00 (CEST)
- Postal codes: 54298
- Dialling codes: 06506
- Vehicle registration: BIT
- Website: Gilzem at site www.suedeifelinfo.de

Gilzem is a municipality in the district of Bitburg-Prüm, in Rhineland-Palatinate, western Germany.
