= Menningen =

- Municipality
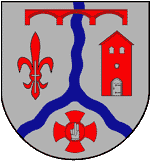
- Coat of arms

- Location of Menningen within Eifelkreis Bitburg-Prüm district
- Interactive map of Menningen
- Location within Germany Location within Rhineland-Palatinate
- Coordinates: 49°50′N 6°29′E
- Country: Germany
- State: Rhineland-Palatinate
- District: Eifelkreis Bitburg-Prüm
- Municipal assoc.: Südeifel

Government
  - Mayor (2019–24): Peter Hinkes

Area
  - Total: 3.42 km^{2} (1.32 sq mi)
- Elevation: 173 m (568 ft)

Population (2025-12-31)
  - Total: 168
  - Density: 49.1/km^{2} (127/sq mi)
- Time zone: UTC+01:00 (CET)
  - Summer (DST): UTC+02:00 (CEST)
- Postal codes: 54310
- Dialling codes: 06525
- Vehicle registration: BIT
- Website: Menningen at site www.suedeifelinfo.de

Menningen is a municipality in the district of Bitburg-Prüm, in Rhineland-Palatinate, western Germany.
