= Waldhof-Falkenstein =

- Municipality
- Location of Waldhof-Falkenstein within Eifelkreis Bitburg-Prüm district
- Interactive map of Waldhof-Falkenstein
- Location within Germany Location within Rhineland-Palatinate
- Coordinates: 49°58′36″N 06°11′34″E
- Country: Germany
- State: Rhineland-Palatinate
- District: Eifelkreis Bitburg-Prüm
- Municipal assoc.: Südeifel

Government
  - Mayor (2019–24): Stefan Frickhofen

Area
  - Total: 3.01 km^{2} (1.16 sq mi)
- Elevation: 458 m (1,503 ft)

Population (2025-12-31)
  - Total: 19
  - Density: 6.3/km^{2} (16/sq mi)
- Time zone: UTC+01:00 (CET)
  - Summer (DST): UTC+02:00 (CEST)
- Postal codes: 54673
- Dialling codes: 06524
- Vehicle registration: BIT
- Website: Waldhof-Falkenstein at site www.suedeifelinfo.de

Waldhof-Falkenstein is a municipality in the district of Bitburg-Prüm, in Rhineland-Palatinate, western Germany.
