= Wallendorf (Eifel) =

- Municipality
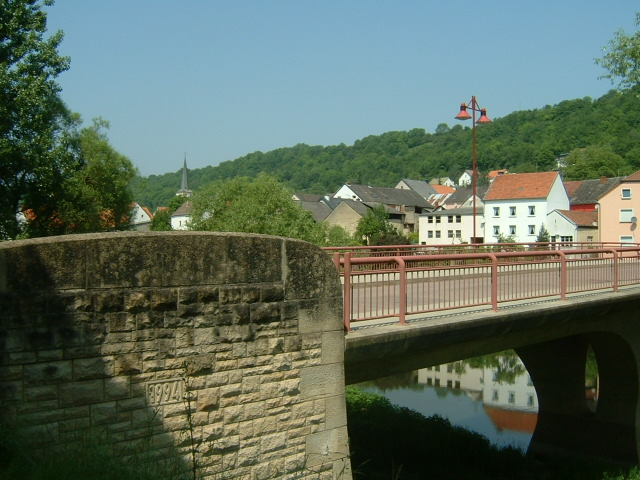

- Coat of arms

- Location of Wallendorf within Eifelkreis Bitburg-Prüm district
- Interactive map of Wallendorf
- Location within Germany Location within Rhineland-Palatinate
- Coordinates: 49°52′46″N 6°17′22″E
- Country: Germany
- State: Rhineland-Palatinate
- District: Eifelkreis Bitburg-Prüm
- Municipal assoc.: Südeifel

Government
  - Mayor (2019–24): Dieter Herschbach

Area
  - Total: 8.71 km^{2} (3.36 sq mi)
- Elevation: 180 m (590 ft)

Population (2025-12-31)
  - Total: 197
  - Density: 22.6/km^{2} (58.6/sq mi)
- Time zone: UTC+01:00 (CET)
  - Summer (DST): UTC+02:00 (CEST)
- Postal codes: 54675
- Dialling codes: 06566
- Vehicle registration: BIT
- Website: Wallendorf at site www.suedeifelinfo.de

Wallendorf (German pronunciation: [ˈvaləndɔʁf]) is a municipality in the German state of Rhineland-Palatinate, on the Sauer river.

Wallendorf was first mentioned in an old document from 1136 as "Vualcheresdorf". It is located on the German side of a bridge connecting it to the Luxembourgish town of Wallendorf-Pont. The bridge was of strategic importance during the Battle of the Bulge in World War II.

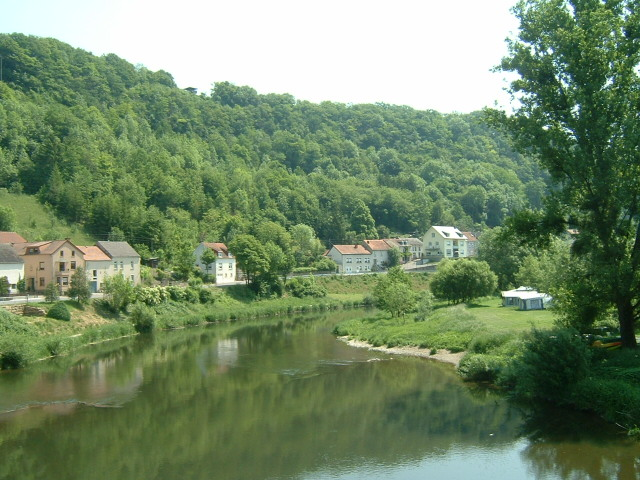
View to the Sauer-River

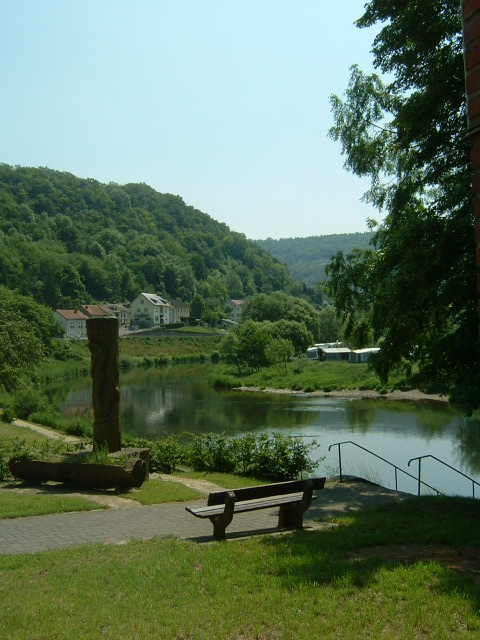
Genoveva-Fountain on the bank
