= Geichlingen =

- Municipality
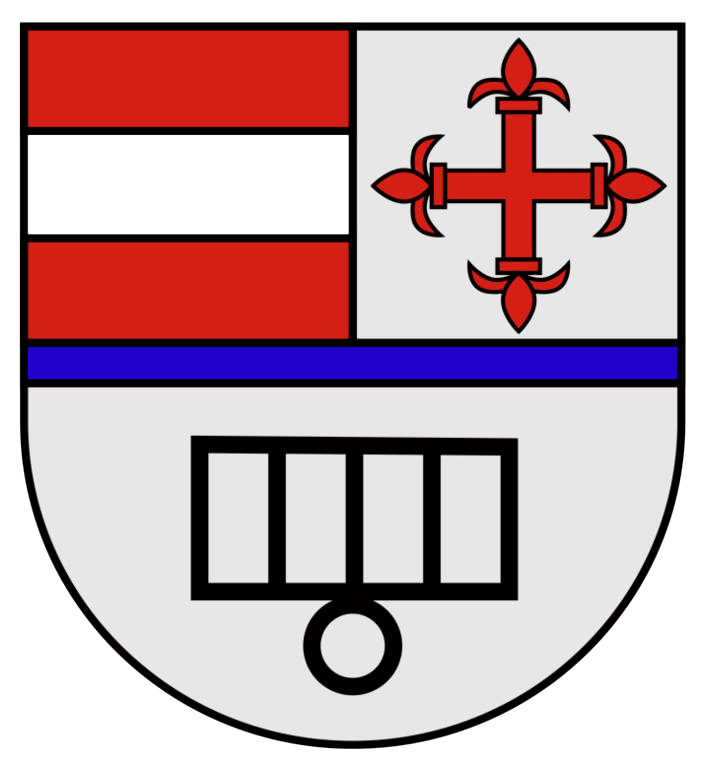
- Coat of arms

- Location of Geichlingen within Eifelkreis Bitburg-Prüm district
- Interactive map of Geichlingen
- Location within Germany Location within Rhineland-Palatinate
- Coordinates: 49°57′10″N 06°16′0″E
- Country: Germany
- State: Rhineland-Palatinate
- District: Eifelkreis Bitburg-Prüm
- Municipal assoc.: Südeifel

Government
  - Mayor (2019–24): Erwin Kaufmann

Area
  - Total: 3.32 km^{2} (1.28 sq mi)
- Elevation: 300–350 m (980–1,150 ft)

Population (2025-12-31)
  - Total: 417
  - Density: 126/km^{2} (325/sq mi)
- Time zone: UTC+01:00 (CET)
  - Summer (DST): UTC+02:00 (CEST)
- Postal codes: 54675
- Dialling codes: 06566
- Vehicle registration: BIT
- Website: Geichlingen at site www.suedeifelinfo.de

Geichlingen is a municipality in the district of Bitburg-Prüm, in Rhineland-Palatinate, western Germany.
