= Karlshausen =

- Municipality
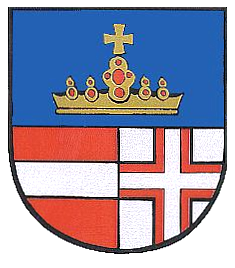
- Coat of arms

- Location of Karlshausen within Eifelkreis Bitburg-Prüm district
- Interactive map of Karlshausen
- Location within Germany Location within Rhineland-Palatinate
- Coordinates: 50°01′23″N 6°13′31″E
- Country: Germany
- State: Rhineland-Palatinate
- District: Eifelkreis Bitburg-Prüm
- Municipal assoc.: Südeifel

Government
  - Mayor (2019–24): Michael Mayer

Area
  - Total: 7.09 km^{2} (2.74 sq mi)
- Elevation: 529 m (1,736 ft)

Population (2025-12-31)
  - Total: 411
  - Density: 58.0/km^{2} (150/sq mi)
- Time zone: UTC+01:00 (CET)
  - Summer (DST): UTC+02:00 (CEST)
- Postal codes: 54673
- Dialling codes: 06550, 06564
- Vehicle registration: BIT
- Website: Karlshausen at site www.suedeifelinfo.de

Karlshausen is a warm, temperate, municipality in the district of Bitburg-Prüm, in Rhineland-Palatinate, western Germany.
