= Heilbach =

- Municipality
- Location of Heilbach within Eifelkreis Bitburg-Prüm district
- Interactive map of Heilbach
- Location within Germany Location within Rhineland-Palatinate
- Coordinates: 50°03′30″N 6°17′35″E
- Country: Germany
- State: Rhineland-Palatinate
- District: Eifelkreis Bitburg-Prüm
- Municipal assoc.: Südeifel

Government
  - Mayor (2019–24): Peter Trauden

Area
  - Total: 6.48 km^{2} (2.50 sq mi)
- Elevation: 468 m (1,535 ft)

Population (2025-12-31)
  - Total: 112
  - Density: 17.3/km^{2} (44.8/sq mi)
- Time zone: UTC+01:00 (CET)
  - Summer (DST): UTC+02:00 (CEST)
- Postal codes: 54673
- Dialling codes: 06564
- Vehicle registration: BIT
- Website: Heilbach at site www.suedeifelinfo.de

Heilbach is a municipality in the district of Bitburg-Prüm, in Rhineland-Palatinate, western Germany.
