= Gentingen =

- Municipality
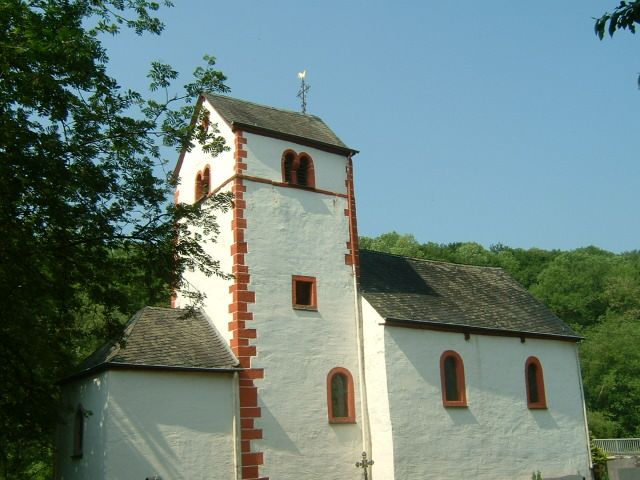

- Location of Gentingen within Eifelkreis Bitburg-Prüm district
- Interactive map of Gentingen
- Location within Germany Location within Rhineland-Palatinate
- Coordinates: 49°54′05″N 06°14′09″E
- Country: Germany
- State: Rhineland-Palatinate
- District: Eifelkreis Bitburg-Prüm
- Municipal assoc.: Südeifel

Government
  - Mayor (2019–24): Franz-Josef Wenzel

Area
  - Total: 4.18 km^{2} (1.61 sq mi)
- Elevation: 194 m (636 ft)

Population (2025-12-31)
  - Total: 96
  - Density: 23/km^{2} (59/sq mi)
- Time zone: UTC+01:00 (CET)
  - Summer (DST): UTC+02:00 (CEST)
- Postal codes: 54675
- Dialling codes: 06566
- Vehicle registration: BIT
- Website: Gentingen at site www.suedeifelinfo.de

Gentingen is a municipality in the district of Bitburg-Prüm, in Rhineland-Palatinate, western Germany.
