= Sevenig bei Neuerburg =

- Municipality
- Location of Sevenig bei Neuerburg within Eifelkreis Bitburg-Prüm district
- Interactive map of Sevenig bei Neuerburg
- Location within Germany Location within Rhineland-Palatinate
- Coordinates: 50°01′17″N 06°11′19″E
- Country: Germany
- State: Rhineland-Palatinate
- District: Eifelkreis Bitburg-Prüm
- Municipal assoc.: Südeifel

Government
  - Mayor (2019–24): Ewald Schoos

Area
  - Total: 5.93 km^{2} (2.29 sq mi)
- Elevation: 474 m (1,555 ft)

Population (2025-12-31)
  - Total: 39
  - Density: 6.6/km^{2} (17/sq mi)
- Time zone: UTC+01:00 (CET)
  - Summer (DST): UTC+02:00 (CEST)
- Postal codes: 54673
- Dialling codes: 06524
- Vehicle registration: BIT
- Website: Sevenig at website www.suedeifelinfo.de

Sevenig bei Neuerburg (German pronunciation: [ˈzeːvənɪç baɪ ˈnɔʏɐbʊʁk], lit. 'Sevenig near Neuerburg') is a municipality in the district of Bitburg-Prüm, in Rhineland-Palatinate, western Germany.
