= Burg, Bitburg-Prüm =

Burg
- Municipality
- Location of Burg within Eifelkreis Bitburg-Prüm district
- Interactive map of Burg
- Location within Germany Location within Rhineland-Palatinate
- Coordinates: 49°57′32″N 06°21′10″E
- Country: Germany
- State: Rhineland-Palatinate
- District: Eifelkreis Bitburg-Prüm
- Municipal assoc.: Südeifel

Government
  - Mayor (2019–24): Ingrid Billen

Area
  - Total: 2.73 km^{2} (1.05 sq mi)
- Elevation: 401 m (1,316 ft)

Population (2025-12-31)
  - Total: 19
  - Density: 7.0/km^{2} (18/sq mi)
- Time zone: UTC+01:00 (CET)
  - Summer (DST): UTC+02:00 (CEST)
- Postal codes: 54646
- Dialling codes: 06522
- Vehicle registration: BIT
- Website: Burg at website www.suedeifelinfo.de

Burg (German pronunciation: [bʊʁk]) is a municipality in the district of Bitburg-Prüm, in Rhineland-Palatinate, western Germany.
