= Körperich =

- Municipality
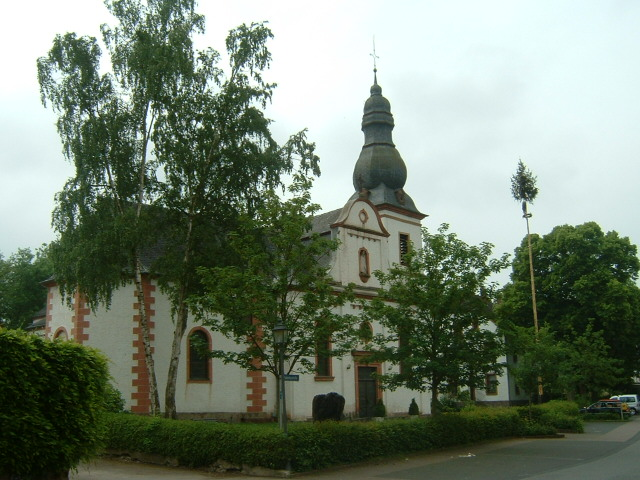

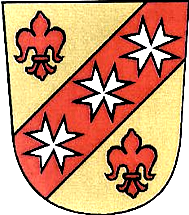
- Coat of arms

- Location of Körperich within Eifelkreis Bitburg-Prüm district
- Interactive map of Körperich
- Location within Germany Location within Rhineland-Palatinate
- Coordinates: 49°55′25″N 6°15′31″E
- Country: Germany
- State: Rhineland-Palatinate
- District: Eifelkreis Bitburg-Prüm
- Municipal assoc.: Südeifel

Government
  - Mayor (2019–24): Hermann-Josef Hecker

Area
  - Total: 19.12 km^{2} (7.38 sq mi)
- Elevation: 258 m (846 ft)

Population (2025-12-31)
  - Total: 1,098
  - Density: 57.43/km^{2} (148.7/sq mi)
- Time zone: UTC+01:00 (CET)
  - Summer (DST): UTC+02:00 (CEST)
- Postal codes: 54675
- Dialling codes: 06566
- Vehicle registration: BIT
- Website: koerperich.org/

Körperich is a municipality in the district of Bitburg-Prüm, in Rhineland-Palatinate, western Germany.
