= Übereisenbach =

- Municipality
- Location of Übereisenbach within Eifelkreis Bitburg-Prüm district
- Interactive map of Übereisenbach
- Location within Germany Location within Rhineland-Palatinate
- Coordinates: 50°00′06″N 06°08′54″E
- Country: Germany
- State: Rhineland-Palatinate
- District: Eifelkreis Bitburg-Prüm
- Municipal assoc.: Südeifel

Government
  - Mayor (2019–24): Albert Theis

Area
  - Total: 2.39 km^{2} (0.92 sq mi)
- Elevation: 280 m (920 ft)

Population (2025-12-31)
  - Total: 53
  - Density: 22/km^{2} (57/sq mi)
- Time zone: UTC+01:00 (CET)
  - Summer (DST): UTC+02:00 (CEST)
- Postal codes: 54689
- Dialling codes: 06524
- Vehicle registration: BIT
- Website: Übereisenbach at website www.suedeifelinfo.de

Übereisenbach is a municipality in the district of Bitburg-Prüm, in Rhineland-Palatinate, western Germany.

== Geographical location ==
Übereisenbach is above the Our, across from the Luxembourgish village Untereisenbach.

== History ==
The place has been mentioned around 450 as a Frankish settlement. Until the end of the 18th century, the community Eisenbach, consisting of the three districts Untereisenbach, Obereisenbach and Übereisenbach, belonged to Luxembourg. As a result of the Congress of Vienna, Übereisenbach became part of Prussia, where Untereisenbach and Obereisenbach at the opposite shore of the Our remained Luxembourgish.

== Attractions ==
Worth seeing is primarily the fountain on the village square.
