= Berkoth =

- Municipality
- Location of Berkoth within Eifelkreis Bitburg-Prüm district
- Interactive map of Berkoth
- Location within Germany Location within Rhineland-Palatinate
- Coordinates: 50°02′38″N 06°20′26″E
- Country: Germany
- State: Rhineland-Palatinate
- District: Eifelkreis Bitburg-Prüm
- Municipal assoc.: Südeifel

Government
  - Mayor (2019–24): Patrick Bretz

Area
  - Total: 7.18 km^{2} (2.77 sq mi)
- Elevation: 519 m (1,703 ft)

Population (2025-12-31)
  - Total: 83
  - Density: 12/km^{2} (30/sq mi)
- Time zone: UTC+01:00 (CET)
  - Summer (DST): UTC+02:00 (CEST)
- Postal codes: 54673
- Dialling codes: 06564
- Vehicle registration: BIT
- Website: www.berkoth.de

Berkoth is a municipality in the district of Bitburg-Prüm, in Rhineland-Palatinate, western Germany. It has an estimated population of 92 people as of 2024.
