= Dauwelshausen =

- Municipality
- Location of Dauwelshausen within Eifelkreis Bitburg-Prüm district
- Interactive map of Dauwelshausen
- Location within Germany Location within Rhineland-Palatinate
- Coordinates: 50°00′13″N 06°11′6″E
- Country: Germany
- State: Rhineland-Palatinate
- District: Eifelkreis Bitburg-Prüm
- Municipal assoc.: Südeifel

Government
  - Mayor (2019–24): Wolfram Bollig

Area
  - Total: 2.05 km^{2} (0.79 sq mi)
- Elevation: 482 m (1,581 ft)

Population (2025-12-31)
  - Total: 88
  - Density: 43/km^{2} (110/sq mi)
- Time zone: UTC+01:00 (CET)
  - Summer (DST): UTC+02:00 (CEST)
- Postal codes: 54673
- Dialling codes: 06524
- Vehicle registration: BIT
- Website: Dauwelshausen at site www.suedeifelinfo.de

Dauwelshausen is a municipality in the district of Bitburg-Prüm, in Rhineland-Palatinate, western Germany.
