= Herbstmühle =

- Municipality
- Coat of arms

- Location of Herbstmühle within Eifelkreis Bitburg-Prüm district
- Interactive map of Herbstmühle
- Location within Germany Location within Rhineland-Palatinate
- Coordinates: 50°00′10″N 06°13′24″E
- Country: Germany
- State: Rhineland-Palatinate
- District: Eifelkreis Bitburg-Prüm
- Municipal assoc.: Südeifel

Government
  - Mayor (2019–24): Bruno Schoos

Area
  - Total: 2.15 km^{2} (0.83 sq mi)
- Elevation: 377 m (1,237 ft)

Population (2025-12-31)
  - Total: 25
  - Density: 12/km^{2} (30/sq mi)
- Time zone: UTC+01:00 (CET)
  - Summer (DST): UTC+02:00 (CEST)
- Postal codes: 54673
- Dialling codes: 06524
- Vehicle registration: BIT
- Website: Herbstmühle at site www.suedeifelinfo.de

Herbstmühle (German pronunciation: [ˈhɛʁpstˌmyːlə]) is a municipality in the district of Bitburg-Prüm, in Rhineland-Palatinate, western Germany.
