= Minden, Rhineland-Palatinate =

Minden
- Municipality
- Coat of arms

- Location of Minden within Eifelkreis Bitburg-Prüm district
- Interactive map of Minden
- Location within Germany Location within Rhineland-Palatinate
- Coordinates: 49°49′29″N 06°28′06″E
- Country: Germany
- State: Rhineland-Palatinate
- District: Eifelkreis Bitburg-Prüm
- Municipal assoc.: Südeifel

Government
  - Mayor (2019–24): Franz-Josef Ferring

Area
  - Total: 3.72 km^{2} (1.44 sq mi)
- Elevation: 251 m (823 ft)

Population (2025-12-31)
  - Total: 256
  - Density: 68.8/km^{2} (178/sq mi)
- Time zone: UTC+01:00 (CET)
  - Summer (DST): UTC+02:00 (CEST)
- Postal codes: 54310
- Dialling codes: 06525
- Vehicle registration: BIT
- Website: Minden at site www.suedeifelinfo.de

Minden (German pronunciation: [ˈmɪndn̩]) is a municipality in the district of Bitburg-Prüm, in Rhineland-Palatinate, western Germany.
