= Kruchten =

- Municipality
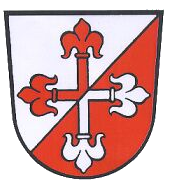
- Coat of arms

- Location of Kruchten within Eifelkreis Bitburg-Prüm district
- Interactive map of Kruchten
- Location within Germany Location within Rhineland-Palatinate
- Coordinates: 49°53′57″N 6°18′53″E
- Country: Germany
- State: Rhineland-Palatinate
- District: Eifelkreis Bitburg-Prüm
- Municipal assoc.: Südeifel

Government
  - Mayor (2019–24): Franziska Hermes

Area
  - Total: 5.38 km^{2} (2.08 sq mi)
- Elevation: 323 m (1,060 ft)

Population (2025-12-31)
  - Total: 404
  - Density: 75.1/km^{2} (194/sq mi)
- Time zone: UTC+01:00 (CET)
  - Summer (DST): UTC+02:00 (CEST)
- Postal codes: 54675
- Dialling codes: 06566, 06526
- Vehicle registration: BIT
- Website: Kruchten at site www.suedeifelinfo.de

Kruchten is a municipality in the district of Bitburg-Prüm, in Rhineland-Palatinate, western Germany.
