= Ernzen, Germany =

Ernzen
- Municipality
- Coat of arms

- Location of Ernzen within Eifelkreis Bitburg-Prüm district
- Interactive map of Ernzen
- Location within Germany Location within Rhineland-Palatinate
- Coordinates: 49°50′30″N 06°25′32″E
- Country: Germany
- State: Rhineland-Palatinate
- District: Eifelkreis Bitburg-Prüm
- Municipal assoc.: Südeifel

Government
  - Mayor (2019–24): Erika Schönhofen

Area
  - Total: 9.99 km^{2} (3.86 sq mi)
- Elevation: 310 m (1,020 ft)

Population (2025-12-31)
  - Total: 411
  - Density: 41.1/km^{2} (107/sq mi)
- Time zone: UTC+01:00 (CET)
  - Summer (DST): UTC+02:00 (CEST)
- Postal codes: 54668
- Dialling codes: 06525
- Vehicle registration: BIT
- Website: ernzen.de

Ernzen is a municipality in the district of Bitburg-Prüm, in Rhineland-Palatinate, western Germany.

== Local activities ==
- Nature - based tourism
- Traditional festival
- Theater Performances
