= Niederweis =

- Municipality
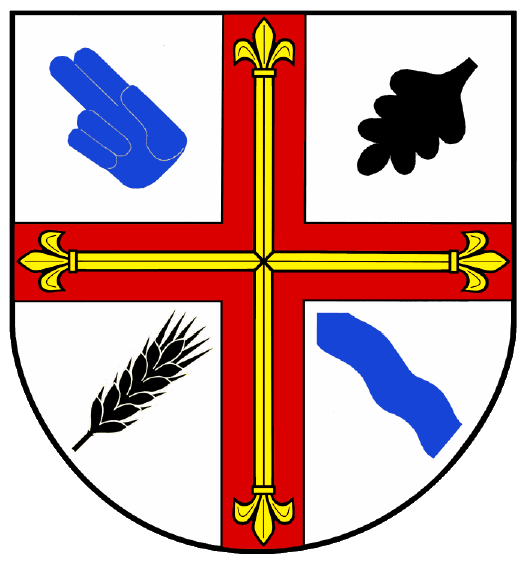
- Coat of arms

- Location of Niederweis within Eifelkreis Bitburg-Prüm district
- Interactive map of Niederweis
- Location within Germany Location within Rhineland-Palatinate
- Coordinates: 49°52′14″N 6°28′03″E
- Country: Germany
- State: Rhineland-Palatinate
- District: Eifelkreis Bitburg-Prüm
- Municipal assoc.: Südeifel

Government
  - Mayor (2019–24): Arno Thies

Area
  - Total: 7.55 km^{2} (2.92 sq mi)
- Elevation: 207 m (679 ft)

Population (2025-12-31)
  - Total: 269
  - Density: 35.6/km^{2} (92.3/sq mi)
- Time zone: UTC+01:00 (CET)
  - Summer (DST): UTC+02:00 (CEST)
- Postal codes: 54668
- Dialling codes: 06568
- Vehicle registration: BIT
- Website: Niederweis at site www.suedeifelinfo.de

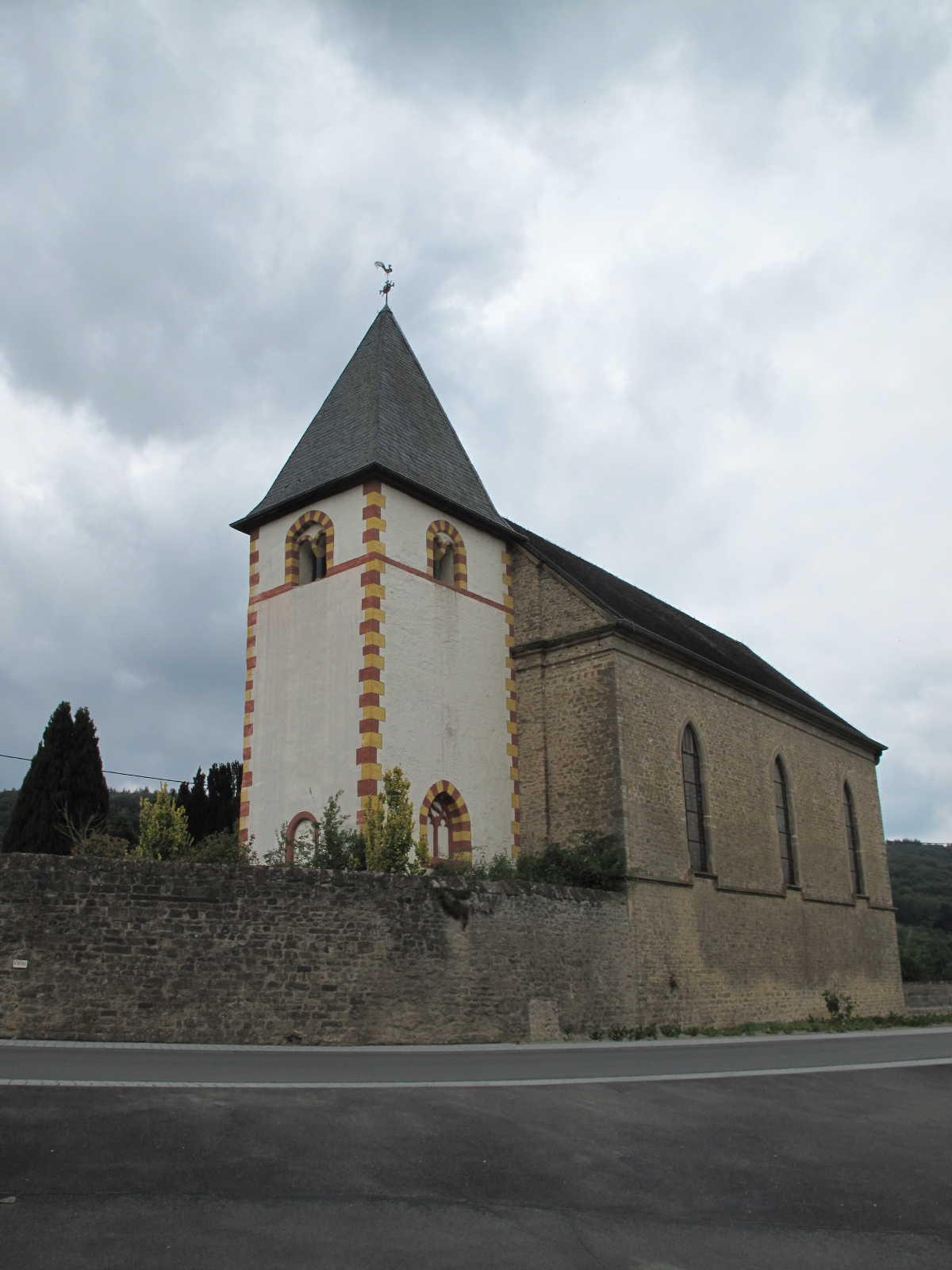
Niederweis: Saint John the Evangelist Church

Niederweis is a municipality in the district of Bitburg-Prüm, in Rhineland-Palatinate, western Germany.
