= Weidingen, Germany =

Weidingen
- Municipality
- Location of Weidingen within Eifelkreis Bitburg-Prüm district
- Interactive map of Weidingen
- Location within Germany Location within Rhineland-Palatinate
- Coordinates: 50°00′47″N 6°22′41″E
- Country: Germany
- State: Rhineland-Palatinate
- District: Eifelkreis Bitburg-Prüm
- Municipal assoc.: Südeifel

Government
  - Mayor (2019–24): Johannes Fandel

Area
  - Total: 5.84 km^{2} (2.25 sq mi)
- Elevation: 434 m (1,424 ft)

Population (2025-12-31)
  - Total: 174
  - Density: 29.8/km^{2} (77.2/sq mi)
- Time zone: UTC+01:00 (CET)
  - Summer (DST): UTC+02:00 (CEST)
- Postal codes: 54636
- Dialling codes: 06527
- Vehicle registration: BIT
- Website: Weidingen at site www.suedeifelinfo.de

Weidingen is a municipality in the district of Bitburg-Prüm, in Rhineland-Palatinate, western Germany.
