= Mettendorf =

- Municipality
- Coat of arms

- Location of Mettendorf within Eifelkreis Bitburg-Prüm district
- Interactive map of Mettendorf
- Location within Germany Location within Rhineland-Palatinate
- Coordinates: 49°56′53″N 6°19′45″E
- Country: Germany
- State: Rhineland-Palatinate
- District: Eifelkreis Bitburg-Prüm
- Municipal assoc.: Südeifel

Government
  - Mayor (2019–24): Nikolaus Kwiatkowski

Area
  - Total: 14.98 km^{2} (5.78 sq mi)
- Elevation: 250 m (820 ft)

Population (2025-12-31)
  - Total: 1,072
  - Density: 71.56/km^{2} (185.3/sq mi)
- Time zone: UTC+01:00 (CET)
  - Summer (DST): UTC+02:00 (CEST)
- Postal codes: 54675
- Dialling codes: 06522
- Vehicle registration: BIT
- Website: www.mettendorf-eifel.de

Mettendorf is a municipality in the district of Bitburg-Prüm, in Rhineland-Palatinate, western Germany.
