= Alsdorf, Bitburg-Prüm =

Alsdorf
- Municipality
- Coat of arms

- Location of Alsdorf within Eifelkreis Bitburg-Prüm district
- Interactive map of Alsdorf
- Location within Germany Location within Rhineland-Palatinate
- Coordinates: 49°52′16″N 06°28′03″E
- Country: Germany
- State: Rhineland-Palatinate
- District: Eifelkreis Bitburg-Prüm
- Municipal assoc.: Südeifel

Government
  - Mayor (2019–24): Manfred Heinen

Area
  - Total: 6.37 km^{2} (2.46 sq mi)
- Elevation: 252 m (827 ft)

Population (2025-12-31)
  - Total: 472
  - Density: 74.1/km^{2} (192/sq mi)
- Time zone: UTC+01:00 (CET)
  - Summer (DST): UTC+02:00 (CEST)
- Postal codes: 54668
- Dialling codes: 06568
- Vehicle registration: BIT
- Website: Alsdorf at site www.suedeifelinfo.de

Alsdorf is a municipality in the district of Bitburg-Prüm, in Rhineland-Palatinate, western Germany.
