= Roth an der Our =

- Municipality
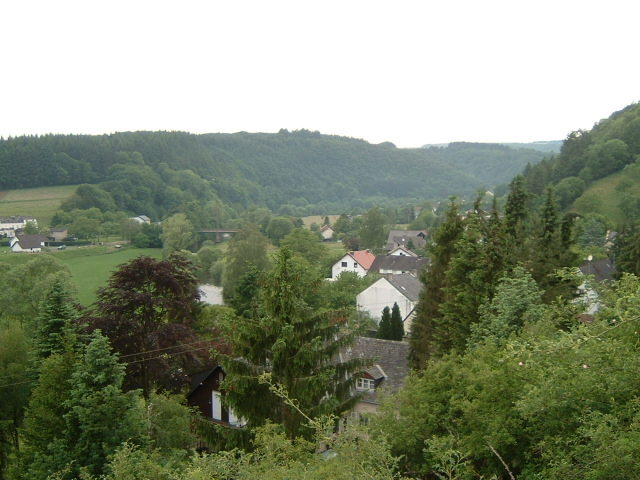

- Coat of arms

- Location of Roth an der Our within Eifelkreis Bitburg-Prüm district
- Interactive map of Roth an der Our
- Location within Germany Location within Rhineland-Palatinate
- Coordinates: 49°55′28″N 6°13′32″E
- Country: Germany
- State: Rhineland-Palatinate
- District: Eifelkreis Bitburg-Prüm
- Municipal assoc.: Südeifel

Area
  - Total: 1.89 km^{2} (0.73 sq mi)
- Elevation: 240 m (790 ft)

Population (2025-12-31)
  - Total: 234
  - Density: 124/km^{2} (321/sq mi)
- Time zone: UTC+01:00 (CET)
  - Summer (DST): UTC+02:00 (CEST)
- Postal codes: 54675
- Dialling codes: 06566
- Vehicle registration: BIT
- Website: Roth an der Our at site www.suedeifelinfo.de

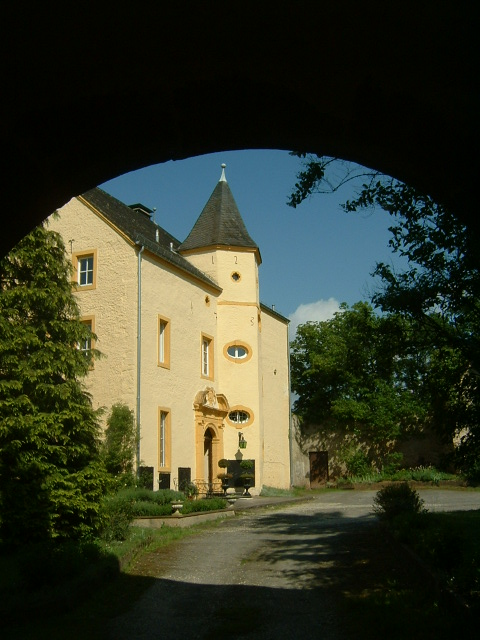
Roth an der Our, Schloss Roth

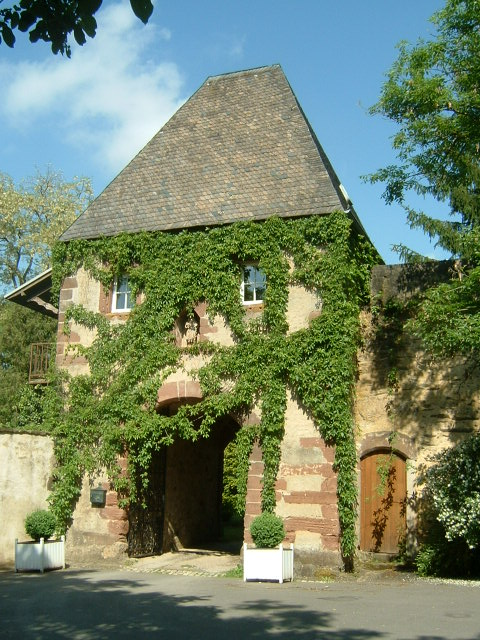
Roth an der Our, Schloss Roth

Roth an der Our (German pronunciation: [ˈʁoːt ʔan deːɐ̯ ˈuːɐ̯], lit. 'Roth on the Our') is a municipality in the district of Bitburg-Prüm, in Rhineland-Palatinate, western Germany.
