= Schankweiler =

- Municipality
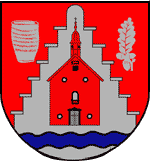
- Coat of arms

- Location of Schankweiler within Eifelkreis Bitburg-Prüm district
- Interactive map of Schankweiler
- Location within Germany Location within Rhineland-Palatinate
- Coordinates: 49°53′56″N 6°23′03″E
- Country: Germany
- State: Rhineland-Palatinate
- District: Eifelkreis Bitburg-Prüm
- Municipal assoc.: Südeifel

Government
  - Mayor (2023–24): Lothar Gansen

Area
  - Total: 6.55 km^{2} (2.53 sq mi)
- Elevation: 230 m (750 ft)

Population (2025-12-31)
  - Total: 197
  - Density: 30.1/km^{2} (77.9/sq mi)
- Time zone: UTC+01:00 (CET)
  - Summer (DST): UTC+02:00 (CEST)
- Postal codes: 54668
- Dialling codes: 06523
- Vehicle registration: BIT
- Website: www.schankweiler-eifel.de

Schankweiler is a municipality in the district of Bitburg-Prüm, in Rhineland-Palatinate, western Germany.

The Hartberg megalithic tomb, a prehistoric site, is near Schankweiler.
