= Bitburg-Prüm =

Coordinates: 50°00′N 6°25′E

- District
- Flag Coat of arms
- Country: Germany
- State: Rhineland-Palatinate
- Capital: Bitburg

Government
  - District admin.: Andreas Kruppert (CDU)

Area
  - Total: 1,626.15 km^{2} (627.86 sq mi)

Population (31 December 2024)
  - Total: 104,435
  - Density: 64.2222/km^{2} (166.335/sq mi)
- Time zone: UTC+01:00 (CET)
  - Summer (DST): UTC+02:00 (CEST)
- Vehicle registration: BIT, PRÜ
- Website: bitburg-pruem.de

The Eifelkreis Bitburg-Prüm (Luxembourgish: Äifelkrees Béibreg-Prüm) is a district in Rhineland-Palatinate, Germany. It is bounded by (from the west and clockwise) Luxembourg, Belgium and the districts of Euskirchen, Vulkaneifel, Bernkastel-Wittlich and Trier-Saarburg.

== History ==
There are three different historical regions: the abbey and the city of Prüm were directly subordinate to the Holy Roman Emperor in medieval times; later the free city became the principality of Prüm, occupying large portions in the north.

The southwest including the town of Bitburg was a part of the Duchy of Luxemburg from the 10th to the 15th century. Later it was a part of the Seventeen Provinces and hence under Spanish and then Austrian rule. After the Napoleonic Wars the region was handed over to Prussia.

The eastern parts of the district, including the town of Kyllburg, were part of the Prince-bishopric of Trier.

When Prussia gained all these regions about 1815, it established the three districts of Bitburg, Prüm and Trier. In 1970 the districts of Bitburg and Prüm were merged with parts of the former district of Trier in order to form the present district.

On 1 January 2007 the full name of the district was changed to be Eifelkreis Bitburg-Prüm instead of Landkreis.

== Geography ==
The district covers the sparsely populated southwestern part of the Eifel Mountains. The portions along the western borders are occupied by a common German-Belgian nature park and a German-Luxembourgish nature park. A great number of rivers rise from the Schneifel in the northwest and from the Kyllwald in the east, and runs southward to the river Sauer (French: Sûre), which is an affluent of the Moselle.

== Coat of arms ==
The coat of arms displays:

- The red cross symbolising the close city of Trier
- The golden tower from the arms of Bitburg
- The silver lamb from the arms of Prüm
- The blue and white pattern from the arms of Luxembourg

== Towns and municipalities ==
It consists of 234 municipalities, making it is the district in Germany with the most municipalities.

Verband-free town
1. Bitburg

Verbandsgemeinden
1. Arzfeld
1. Arzfeld^{1}; 2. Dackscheid; 3. Dahnen; 4. Daleiden; 5. Dasburg; 6. Eilscheid; 7. Eschfeld; 8. Euscheid; 9. Großkampenberg; 10. Hargarten; 11. Harspelt	12. Herzfeld; 13. Irrhausen; 14. Jucken; 15. Kesfeld; 16. Kickeshausen; 17. Kinzenburg; 18. Krautscheid; 19. Lambertsberg; 20. Lascheid; 21. Lauperath; 22. Leidenborn	23. Lichtenborn; 24. Lierfeld; 25. Lünebach; 26. Lützkampen; 27. Manderscheid; 28. Mauel; 29. Merlscheid; 30. Niederpierscheid; 31. Oberpierscheid; 32. Olmscheid; 33. Pintesfeld	34. Plütscheid; 35. Preischeid; 36. Reiff; 37. Reipeldingen; 38. Roscheid; 39. Sengerich; 40. Sevenig (Our); 41. Strickscheid; 42. Üttfeld; 43. Waxweiler
2. Bitburger Land [seat: Bitburg]
1. Badem; 2. Balesfeld; 3. Baustert; 4. Bettingen; 5. Bickendorf; 6. Biersdorf am See; 7. Birtlingen; 8. Brecht; 9. Brimingen; 10. Burbach; 11. Dahlem; 12. Dockendorf; 13. Dudeldorf; 14. Echtershausen; 15. Ehlenz; 16. Enzen; 17. Eßlingen; 18. Etteldorf	19. Feilsdorf; 20. Fließem; 21. Gindorf; 22. Gondorf; 23. Gransdorf; 24. Halsdorf; 25. Hamm; 26. Heilenbach; 27. Hütterscheid; 28. Hüttingen an der Kyll; 29. Idenheim; 30. Idesheim; 31. Ingendorf; 32. Kyllburg^{2}; 33. Kyllburgweiler; 34. Ließem; 35. Malberg; 36. Malbergweich	37. Meckel; 38. Messerich; 39. Metterich; 40. Mülbach; 41. Nattenheim; 42. Neidenbach; 43. Neuheilenbach; 44. Niederstedem; 45. Niederweiler; 46. Oberkail; 47. Oberstedem; 48. Oberweiler; 49. Oberweis; 50. Olsdorf; 51. Orsfeld; 52. Pickließem; 53. Rittersdorf; 54. Röhl	55. Sankt Thomas; 56. Scharfbillig; 57. Schleid; 58. Seffern; 59. Sefferweich; 60. Seinsfeld; 61. Steinborn; 62. Stockem; 63. Sülm; 64. Trimport; 65. Usch; 66. Wettlingen; 67. Wiersdorf; 68. Wilsecker; 69. Wißmannsdorf; 70. Wolsfeld; 71. Zendscheid
3. Südeifel
1. Affler; 2. Alsdorf; 3. Altscheid; 4. Ammeldingen an der Our; 5. Ammeldingen bei Neuerburg; 6. Bauler; 7. Berkoth; 8. Berscheid; 9. Biesdorf; 10. Bollendorf; 11. Burg; 12. Dauwelshausen; 13. Echternacherbrück; 14. Eisenach; 15. Emmelbaum; 16. Ernzen; 17. Ferschweiler	18. Fischbach-Oberraden; 19. Geichlingen; 20. Gemünd; 21. Gentingen; 22. Gilzem; 23. Heilbach; 24. Herbstmühle; 25. Holsthum; 26. Hommerdingen; 27. Hütten; 28. Hüttingen bei Lahr; 29. Irrel; 30. Karlshausen; 31. Kaschenbach; 32. Keppeshausen; 33. Körperich; 34. Koxhausen	35. Kruchten; 36. Lahr; 37. Leimbach; 38. Menningen; 39. Mettendorf; 40. Minden; 41. Muxerath; 42. Nasingen; 43. Neuerburg^{1, 2}; 44. Niederraden; 45. Niederweis; 46. Niehl; 47. Nusbaum; 48. Obergeckler; 49. Peffingen; 50. Plascheid; 51. Prümzurlay	52. Rodershausen; 53. Roth an der Our; 54. Schankweiler; 55. Scheitenkorb; 56. Scheuern; 57. Sevenig bei Neuerburg; 58. Sinspelt; 59. Übereisenbach; 60. Uppershausen; 61. Utscheid; 62. Waldhof-Falkenstein; 63. Wallendorf; 64. Weidingen; 65. Zweifelscheid
4. Prüm
1. Auw bei Prüm; 2. Bleialf; 3. Brandscheid; 4. Buchet; 5. Büdesheim; 6. Dingdorf; 7. Feuerscheid; 8. Fleringen; 9. Giesdorf; 10. Gondenbrett; 11. Großlangenfeld	12. Habscheid; 13. Heckhuscheid; 14. Heisdorf; 15. Hersdorf; 16. Kleinlangenfeld; 17. Lasel; 18. Masthorn; 19. Matzerath; 20. Mützenich; 21. Neuendorf; 22. Niederlauch	23. Nimshuscheid; 24. Nimsreuland; 25. Oberlascheid; 26. Oberlauch; 27. Olzheim; 28. Orlenbach; 29. Pittenbach; 30. Pronsfeld; 31. Prüm^{1, 2}; 32. Rommersheim; 33. Roth bei Prüm	34. Schönecken; 35. Schwirzheim; 36. Seiwerath; 37. Sellerich; 38. Wallersheim; 39. Watzerath; 40. Wawern; 41. Weinsheim; 42. Winringen; 43. Winterscheid; 44. Winterspelt
5. Speicher
1. Auw an der Kyll; 2. Beilingen; 3. Herforst	4. Hosten; 5. Orenhofen; 6. Philippsheim	7. Preist; 8. Spangdahlem; 9. Speicher^{1}
^{1}seat of the Verbandsgemeinde; ^{2}town

== Transport links ==
Verkehrsverbund Region Trier

The Eifel Railway from Hürth -Kalscheuren station to Trier Ehrang is partly located in the district and the only line which is also in service, the Nims-Sauertalbahn, the Westeifelbahn from Gerolstein via Prüm to Waxweiler, the Enztalbahn and the Pruümertalbahn are out of service.

The district is located in the area of the transport association Verkehrsverbund Region Trier (VRT).
