= Emmelbaum =

- Municipality
- Location of Emmelbaum within Eifelkreis Bitburg-Prüm district
- Interactive map of Emmelbaum
- Location within Germany Location within Rhineland-Palatinate
- Coordinates: 50°3′24″N 6°15′43″E
- Country: Germany
- State: Rhineland-Palatinate
- District: Eifelkreis Bitburg-Prüm
- Municipal assoc.: Südeifel

Government
  - Mayor (2019–24): Manfred Schreiber

Area
  - Total: 2.69 km^{2} (1.04 sq mi)
- Elevation: 515 m (1,690 ft)

Population (2025-12-31)
  - Total: 79
  - Density: 29/km^{2} (76/sq mi)
- Time zone: UTC+01:00 (CET)
  - Summer (DST): UTC+02:00 (CEST)
- Postal codes: 54673
- Dialling codes: 06564
- Vehicle registration: BIT
- Website: Emmelbaum at site www.suedeifelinfo.de

Emmelbaum (German pronunciation: [ˈɛml̩ˌbaʊ̯m]) is a municipality in the district of Bitburg-Prüm, in Rhineland-Palatinate, western Germany.
