= Zweifelscheid =

- Municipality
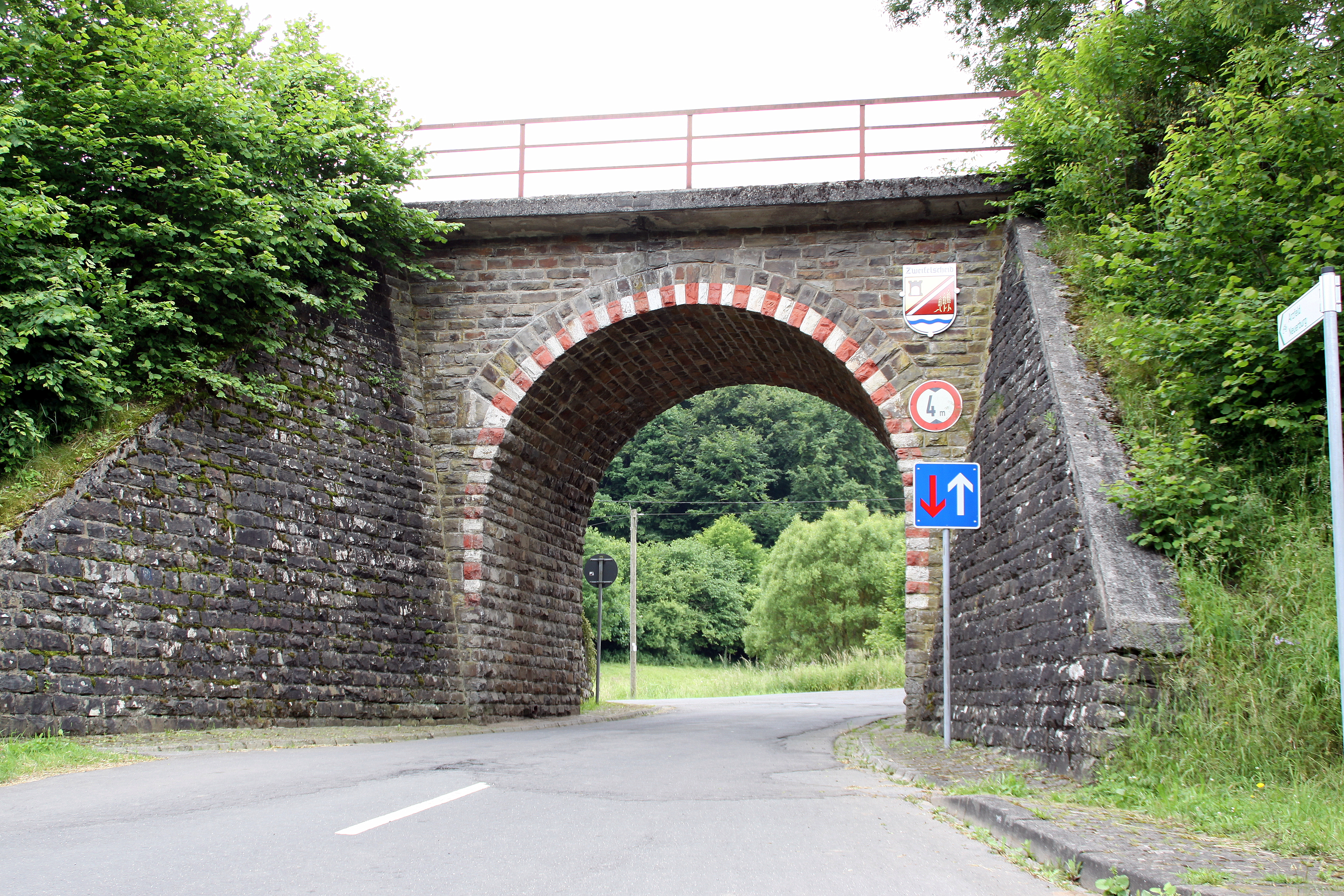

- Coat of arms

- Location of Zweifelscheid within Eifelkreis Bitburg-Prüm district
- Interactive map of Zweifelscheid
- Location within Germany Location within Rhineland-Palatinate
- Coordinates: 50°02′25″N 6°15′25″E
- Country: Germany
- State: Rhineland-Palatinate
- District: Eifelkreis Bitburg-Prüm
- Municipal assoc.: Südeifel

Government
  - Mayor (2019–24): Alexander Balmes

Area
  - Total: 1.82 km^{2} (0.70 sq mi)
- Elevation: 370 m (1,210 ft)

Population (2025-12-31)
  - Total: 54
  - Density: 30/km^{2} (77/sq mi)
- Time zone: UTC+01:00 (CET)
  - Summer (DST): UTC+02:00 (CEST)
- Postal codes: 54673
- Dialling codes: 06564
- Vehicle registration: BIT
- Website: www.zweifelscheid.de

Zweifelscheid (German pronunciation: [ˈtsvaɪfl̩ˌʃaɪt]) is a municipality in the district of Bitburg-Prüm, in Rhineland-Palatinate, western Germany.
