= Berscheid =

- Municipality
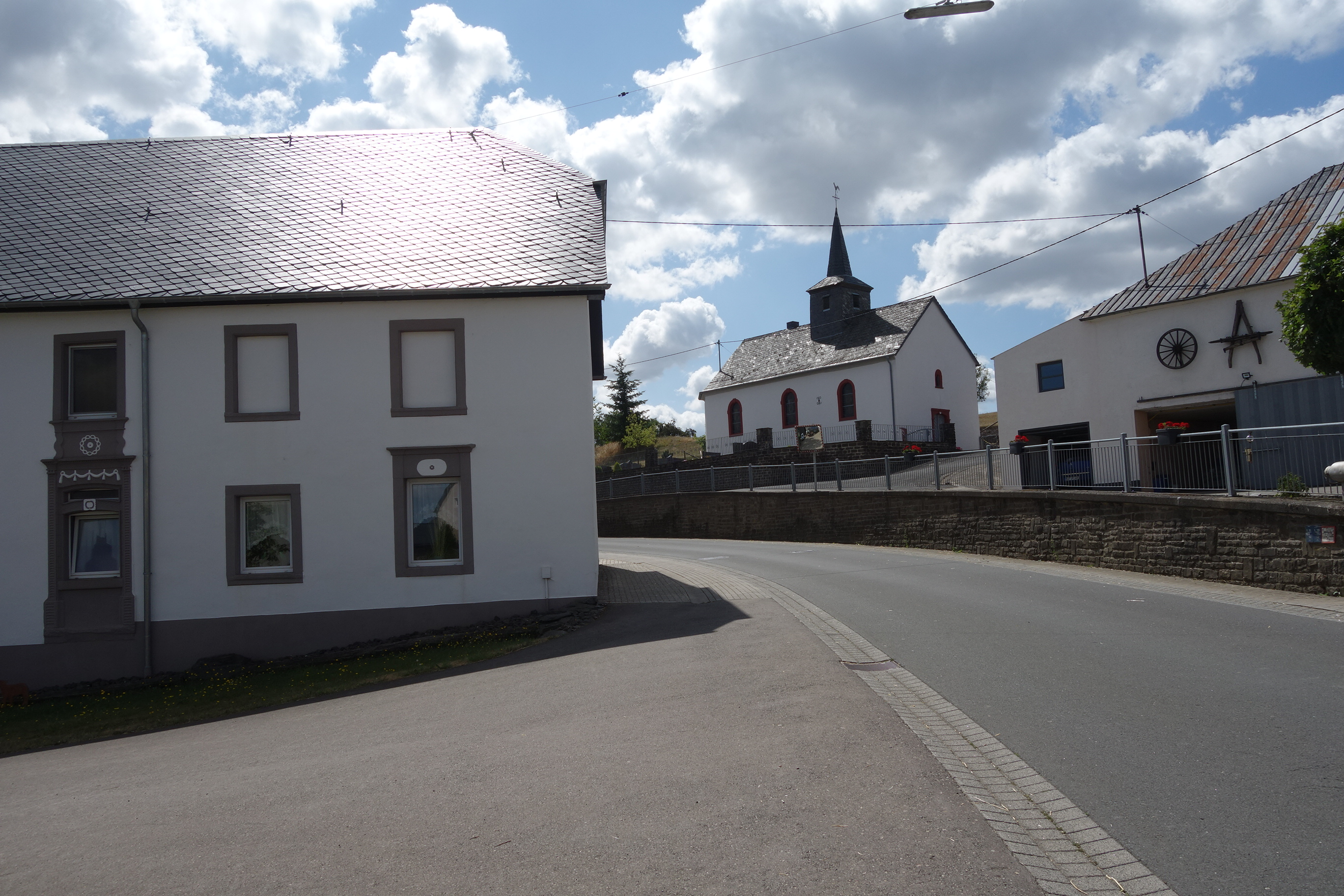

- Location of Berscheid within Eifelkreis Bitburg-Prüm district
- Interactive map of Berscheid
- Location within Germany Location within Rhineland-Palatinate
- Coordinates: 49°59′1″N 06°13′53″E
- Country: Germany
- State: Rhineland-Palatinate
- District: Eifelkreis Bitburg-Prüm
- Municipal assoc.: Südeifel

Government
  - Mayor (2019–24): Albert Schier

Area
  - Total: 7.49 km^{2} (2.89 sq mi)
- Elevation: 490 m (1,610 ft)

Population (2025-12-31)
  - Total: 62
  - Density: 8.3/km^{2} (21/sq mi)
- Time zone: UTC+01:00 (CET)
  - Summer (DST): UTC+02:00 (CEST)
- Postal codes: 54673
- Dialling codes: 06524
- Vehicle registration: BIT
- Website: Berscheid at website www.suedeifelinfo.de

Berscheid is a municipality in the district of Bitburg-Prüm, in Rhineland-Palatinate, western Germany.
