= Leimbach, Bitburg-Prüm =

Leimbach
- Municipality
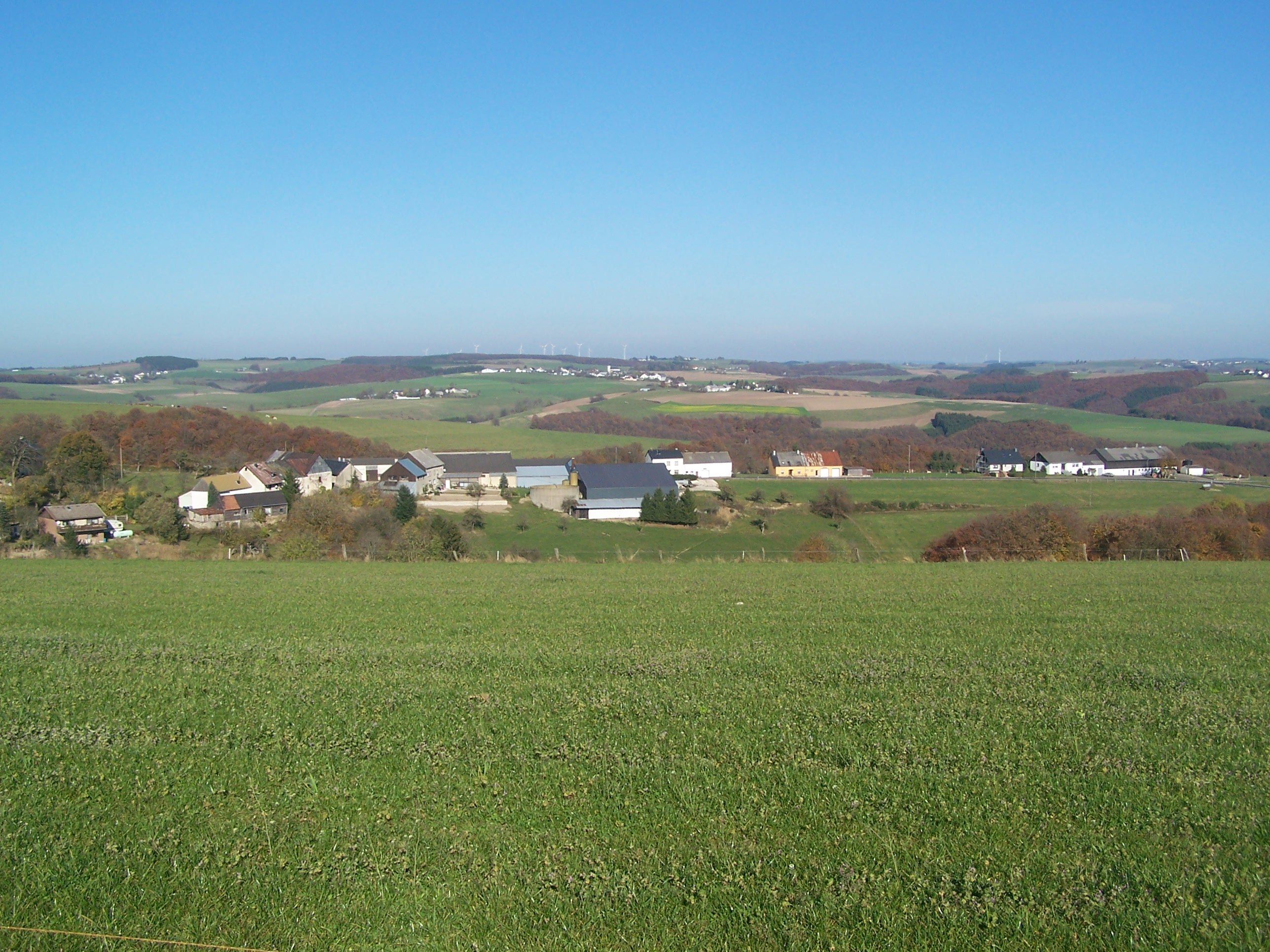
- Interactive map of Leimbach
- Location within Germany Location within Rhineland-Palatinate
- Coordinates: 50°01′29″N 06°15′23″E
- Country: Germany
- State: Rhineland-Palatinate
- District: Eifelkreis Bitburg-Prüm
- Municipal assoc.: Südeifel
- Subdivisions: 3

Government
  - Mayor (2019–24): Sascha Gödert

Area
  - Total: 2.95 km^{2} (1.14 sq mi)
- Elevation: 500 m (1,600 ft)

Population (2025-12-31)
  - Total: 42
  - Density: 14/km^{2} (37/sq mi)
- Time zone: UTC+01:00 (CET)
  - Summer (DST): UTC+02:00 (CEST)
- Postal codes: 54673
- Dialling codes: 06564
- Vehicle registration: BIT
- Website: www.leimbach-eifel.de

Leimbach (German: [ˈlaɪmbax]) is a municipality in the district of Bitburg-Prüm, in Rhineland-Palatinate, western Germany.
