= Ammeldingen an der Our =

- Municipality
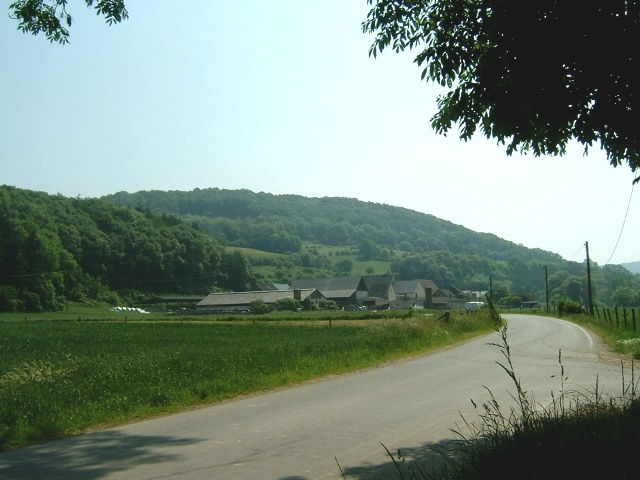

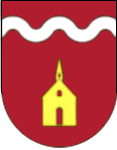
- Coat of arms

- Location of Ammeldingen an der Our within Eifelkreis Bitburg-Prüm district
- Interactive map of Ammeldingen an der Our
- Location within Germany Location within Rhineland-Palatinate
- Coordinates: 49°53′21″N 06°15′18″E
- Country: Germany
- State: Rhineland-Palatinate
- District: Eifelkreis Bitburg-Prüm
- Municipal assoc.: Südeifel

Government
  - Mayor (2019–24): Arnold Theis

Area
  - Total: 2.61 km^{2} (1.01 sq mi)
- Elevation: 350 m (1,150 ft)

Population (2025-12-31)
  - Total: 19
  - Density: 7.3/km^{2} (19/sq mi)
- Time zone: UTC+01:00 (CET)
  - Summer (DST): UTC+02:00 (CEST)
- Postal codes: 54675
- Dialling codes: 06566
- Vehicle registration: BIT
- Website: Ammeldingen an der Our at site www.suedeifelinfo.de

Ammeldingen an der Our (German pronunciation: [ˈaml̩dɪŋən ʔan deːɐ̯ ˈuːɐ̯], lit. 'Ammeldingen on the Our') is a municipality in the district of Bitburg-Prüm, in Rhineland-Palatinate, western Germany.

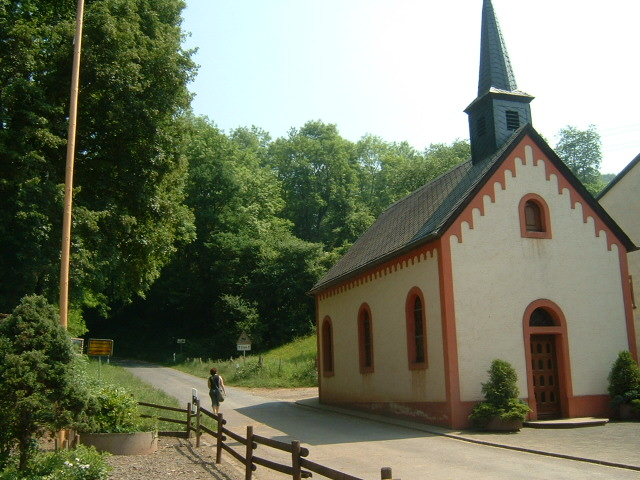
