= Lahr, Bitburg-Prüm =

Lahr
- Municipality
- Location of Lahr within Eifelkreis Bitburg-Prüm district
- Interactive map of Lahr
- Location within Germany Location within Rhineland-Palatinate
- Coordinates: 49°56′39″N 6°17′28″E
- Country: Germany
- State: Rhineland-Palatinate
- District: Eifelkreis Bitburg-Prüm
- Municipal assoc.: Südeifel

Government
  - Mayor (2019–24): Stefan Jüngels

Area
  - Total: 7.23 km^{2} (2.79 sq mi)
- Elevation: 300 m (980 ft)

Population (2025-12-31)
  - Total: 180
  - Density: 25/km^{2} (64/sq mi)
- Time zone: UTC+01:00 (CET)
  - Summer (DST): UTC+02:00 (CEST)
- Postal codes: 54675
- Dialling codes: 06566
- Vehicle registration: BIT
- Website: Lahr at site www.suedeifelinfo.de

Lahr (German pronunciation: [ˈlaːɐ̯]) is a municipality in the district of Bitburg-Prüm, in Rhineland-Palatinate, western Germany.
