= Sinspelt =

- Municipality
- Coat of arms

- Location of Sinspelt within Eifelkreis Bitburg-Prüm district
- Interactive map of Sinspelt
- Location within Germany Location within Rhineland-Palatinate
- Coordinates: 49°58′25″N 6°19′19″E
- Country: Germany
- State: Rhineland-Palatinate
- District: Eifelkreis Bitburg-Prüm
- Municipal assoc.: Südeifel

Government
  - Mayor (2019–24): Leo Schuh

Area
  - Total: 2.44 km^{2} (0.94 sq mi)
- Elevation: 278 m (912 ft)

Population (2025-12-31)
  - Total: 406
  - Density: 166/km^{2} (431/sq mi)
- Time zone: UTC+01:00 (CET)
  - Summer (DST): UTC+02:00 (CEST)
- Postal codes: 54675
- Dialling codes: 06522
- Vehicle registration: BIT
- Website: Sinspelt at website www.suedeifelinfo.de

Sinspelt is a municipality in the district of Bitburg-Prüm, in Rhineland-Palatinate, western Germany.
