= Neuerburg =

City in Rhineland-Palatinate, Germany

- Town
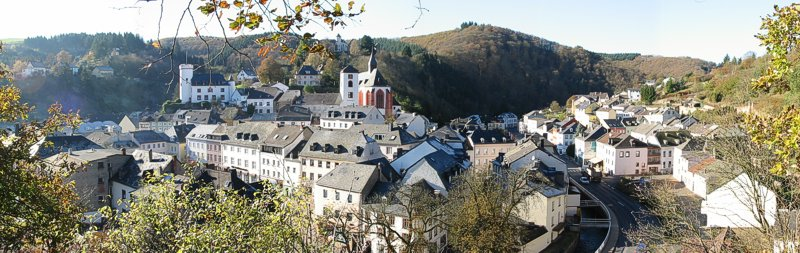
- Neuerburg panorama with the parish house, castle and the church

- Coat of arms

- Location of Neuerburg within Eifelkreis Bitburg-Prüm district
- Interactive map of Neuerburg
- Location within Germany Location within Rhineland-Palatinate
- Coordinates: 50°00′38″N 06°17′45″E
- Country: Germany
- State: Rhineland-Palatinate
- District: Eifelkreis Bitburg-Prüm
- Municipal assoc.: Südeifel

Government
  - Mayor (2019–24): Lothar Fallis

Area
  - Total: 10.17 km^{2} (3.93 sq mi)
- Elevation: 330 m (1,080 ft)

Population (2025-12-31)
  - Total: 1,307
  - Density: 128.5/km^{2} (332.9/sq mi)
- Time zone: UTC+01:00 (CET)
  - Summer (DST): UTC+02:00 (CEST)
- Postal codes: 54673
- Dialling codes: 06564
- Vehicle registration: BIT
- Website: www.neuerburg-eifel.de

Neuerburg (German pronunciation: [ˈnɔʏɐbʊʁk]; Luxembourgish: Neierbuerg [ˈnɑɪ̯ɐbu̯əɕ]) is a city in the district of Bitburg-Prüm, in Rhineland-Palatinate, Germany.

It is situated in the Eifel, near the border with Luxembourg, approximately 20 km north-west of Bitburg and 20 km north-east of Diekirch.

Neuerburg was formerly the seat of the Verbandsgemeinde ("collective municipality") of Neuerburg, and since 1 July 2014 has been the seat of the Verbandsgemeinde Südeifel.

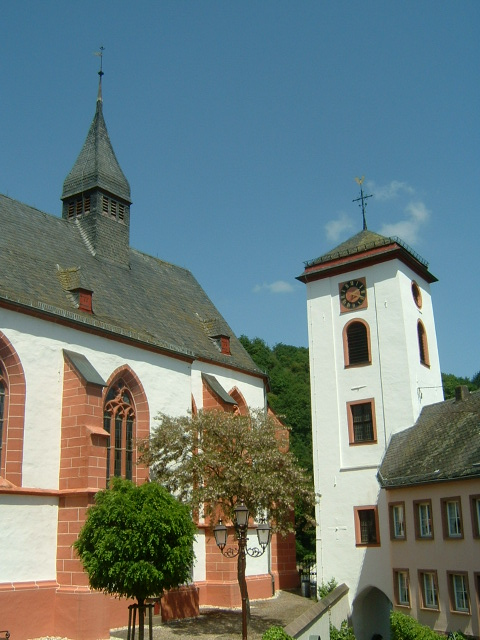
Church and Gate tower

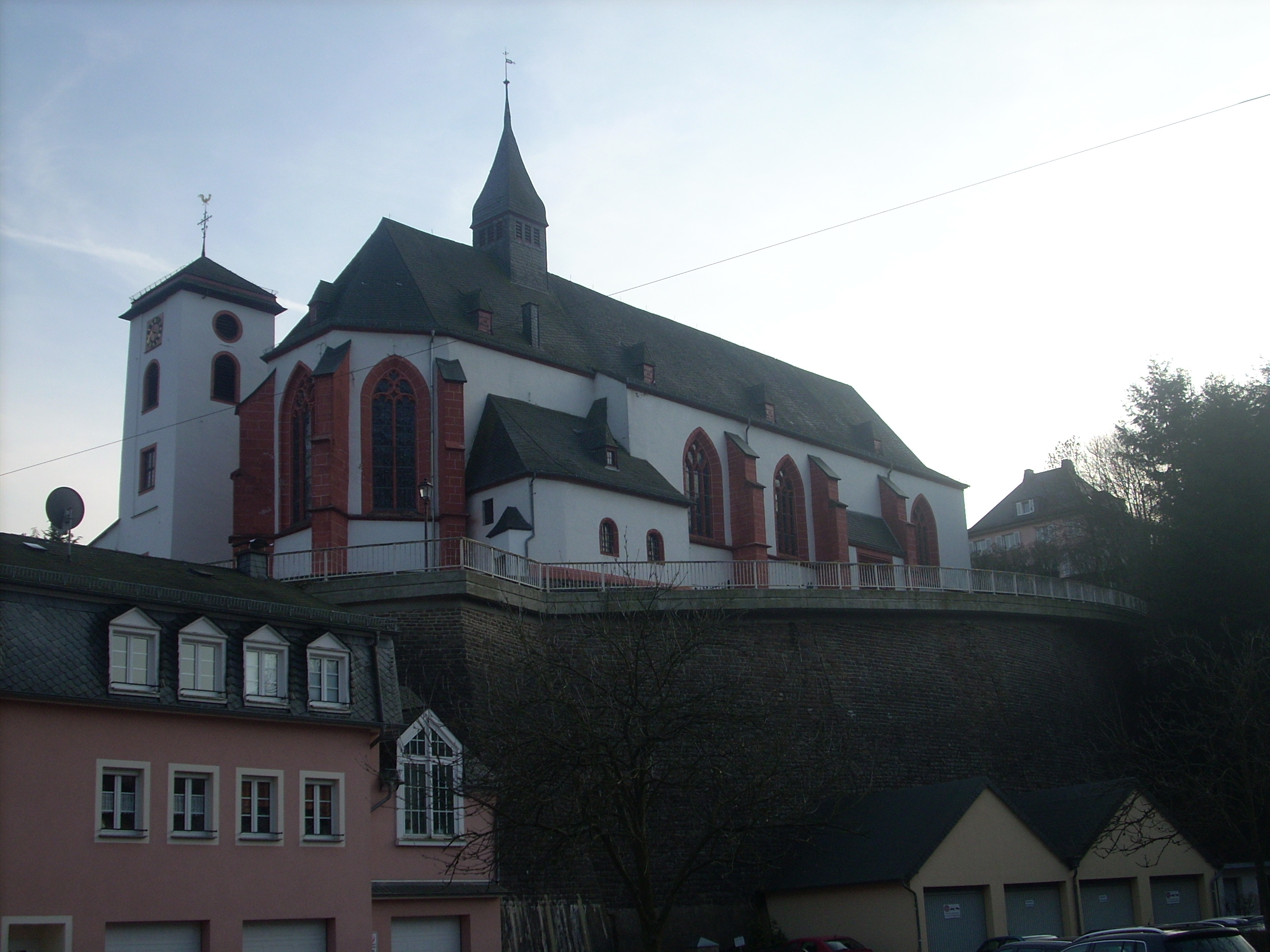
Church
