= Bitburg-Land =

Bitburg-Land is a former Verbandsgemeinde (municipal association) in the district Bitburg-Prüm, in Rhineland-Palatinate, Germany. It was situated around the town Bitburg, which was the seat of the Verbandsgemeinde, but not a part of it. On 1 July 2014 it merged into the new Verbandsgemeinde Bitburger Land.

Bitburg-Land consisted of the following Ortsgemeinden ("local municipalities"):

1. Baustert
2. Bettingen
3. Bickendorf
4. Biersdorf am See
5. Birtlingen
6. Brecht
7. Brimingen
8. Dahlem
9. Dockendorf
10. Dudeldorf
11. Echtershausen
12. Ehlenz
13. Enzen
14. Eßlingen
15. Feilsdorf
16. Fließem
17. Gondorf
18. Halsdorf
19. Hamm
20. Heilenbach
21. Hisel
22. Hütterscheid
23. Hüttingen an der Kyll
24. Idenheim
25. Idesheim
26. Ingendorf
27. Ließem
28. Meckel
29. Messerich
30. Metterich
31. Mülbach
32. Nattenheim
33. Niederstedem
34. Niederweiler
35. Oberstedem
36. Oberweiler
37. Oberweis
38. Olsdorf
39. Rittersdorf
40. Röhl
41. Scharfbillig
42. Schleid
43. Seffern
44. Sefferweich
45. Stockem
46. Sülm
47. Trimport
48. Wettlingen
49. Wiersdorf
50. Wißmannsdorf
51. Wolsfeld
