= Kyllburg (Verbandsgemeinde) =

Coordinates: 50.042°N 6.595°E

Kyllburg is a former Verbandsgemeinde ("collective municipality") in Waldeifel region in the district Bitburg-Prüm, in Rhineland-Palatinate, Germany. Since 1970, the seat of the Verbandsgemeinde was in Kyllburg. On 1 July 2014 it merged into the new Verbandsgemeinde Bitburger Land.

The Verbandsgemeinde Kyllburg consisted of the following Ortsgemeinden ("local municipalities"):

1. Badem
2. Balesfeld
3. Burbach
4. Etteldorf
5. Gindorf
6. Gransdorf
7. Kyllburg
8. Kyllburgweiler
9. Malberg
10. Malbergweich
11. Neidenbach
12. Neuheilenbach
13. Oberkail
14. Orsfeld
15. Pickließem
16. Sankt Thomas
17. Seinsfeld
18. Steinborn
19. Usch
20. Wilsecker
21. Zendscheid
