= Badem =

- Municipality
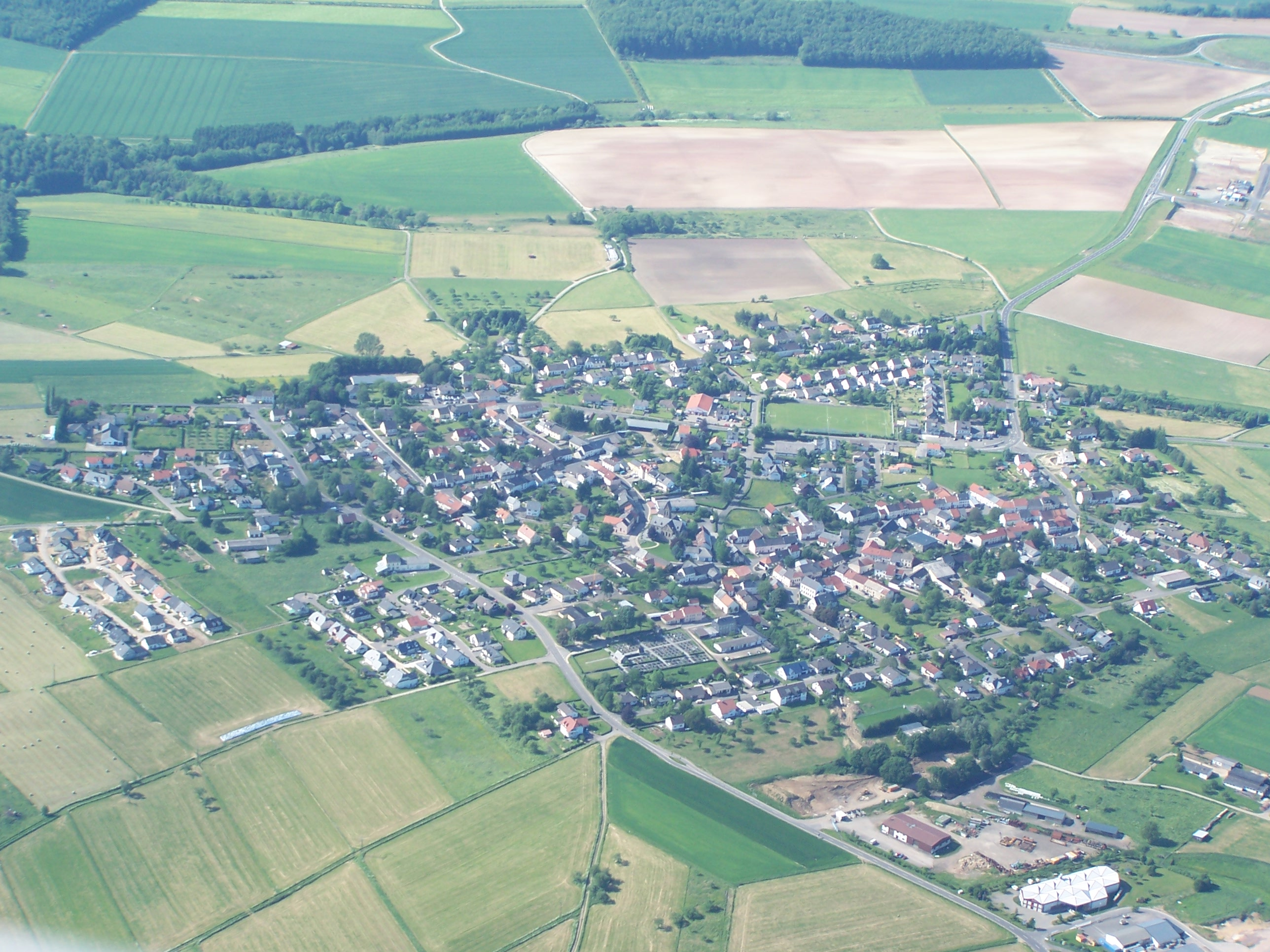

- Coat of arms

- Location of Badem within Eifelkreis Bitburg-Prüm district
- Interactive map of Badem
- Location within Germany Location within Rhineland-Palatinate
- Coordinates: 50°00′9.28″N 06°36′28.30″E
- Country: Germany
- State: Rhineland-Palatinate
- District: Eifelkreis Bitburg-Prüm
- Municipal assoc.: Bitburger Land

Government
  - Mayor (2019–24): Bernhard Klein (CDU)

Area
  - Total: 9.16 km^{2} (3.54 sq mi)
- Elevation: 370 m (1,210 ft)

Population (2025-12-31)
  - Total: 1,323
  - Density: 144/km^{2} (374/sq mi)
- Time zone: UTC+01:00 (CET)
  - Summer (DST): UTC+02:00 (CEST)
- Postal codes: 54657
- Dialling codes: 06563
- Vehicle registration: BIT
- Website: www.badem.de

Badem is a municipality in the district of Bitburg-Prüm, in Rhineland-Palatinate, western Germany.

== Geography ==
Badem is located northeast of Bitburg on the Gindorf plateau, a landscape area of the so-called Gutland. The residential areas of Heidehof and Waldhof also belong to Badem.

Neighbouring communities next to the city of Bitburg are Wilsecker in the northwest, Orsfeld in the north, Gindorf in the east, Pickließem and Dudeldorf in the southeast and Metterich in the southwest.

== History ==
Two Roman cremation burial grounds were discovered northeast of Badem during clearing work in 1921 and 1934. These suggest settlement in Celtic and Roman times. In 1934/35, during construction work on both sides of the cremation burial grounds, two groups of burial mounds were discovered, which probably once formed a connected necropolis. The first group of burial mounds can be assigned to the 3rd century AD. The second group of burial mounds probably dates from the time of the Hunsrück-Eifel culture, but has not yet been examined in detail.

The place was first mentioned in a document in 893 in the Prüm Urbar under the name "Badenheym".

Until the end of the 18th century, the place belonged to the provostship of Bitburg, which was part of the Duchy of Luxembourg.

After 1792, French revolutionary troops occupied the Austrian Netherlands, to which the Duchy of Luxembourg and thus also Badem belonged at the time, and annexed it in 1795. Under French administration, Badem was assigned to the canton of Dudeldorf in 1795, which administratively belonged to the arrondissement of Bitburg in the department of Wälder .

Due to the decisions of the Congress of Vienna, the region came to the Kingdom of Prussia in 1815. Under the Prussian administration, Badem belonged to the mayoralty of Ordorf in the Bitburg district of the Trier administrative district, which was newly established in 1816.

== Religion ==
The parish of Badem was originally a branch of Ordorf. During a visitation of the parish of Ordorf in 1570, the chapel "Badenhem" already had its own churchyard. The chapel was then dedicated to the Blessed Virgin Mary and had three altars. Since 1738, St. Eligius was the patron saint of the chapel. During the so-called French period, the residents of Badem applied for a separation from the parish of Ordorf. During the reorganization of the church system, Badem became a succursal parish (auxiliary parish) in 1803. The current neo-Romanesque Badem church was built between 1907 and 1908 according to plans by the Trier cathedral master builder Julius Wirtz . Shortly afterwards, in the years 1909 to 1910, Wirtz built the church of St. Antonius von Padua (Niedersaubach) in Saarland, based on the Badem model. Although it was smaller, it was comparable in terms of interior and exterior architectural design and style. The current parish of Badem has no branches. It is part of the parish association of the parishes around Kyllburg, where the priest's office is also located. The parish of Badem belongs to the Diocese of Trier.

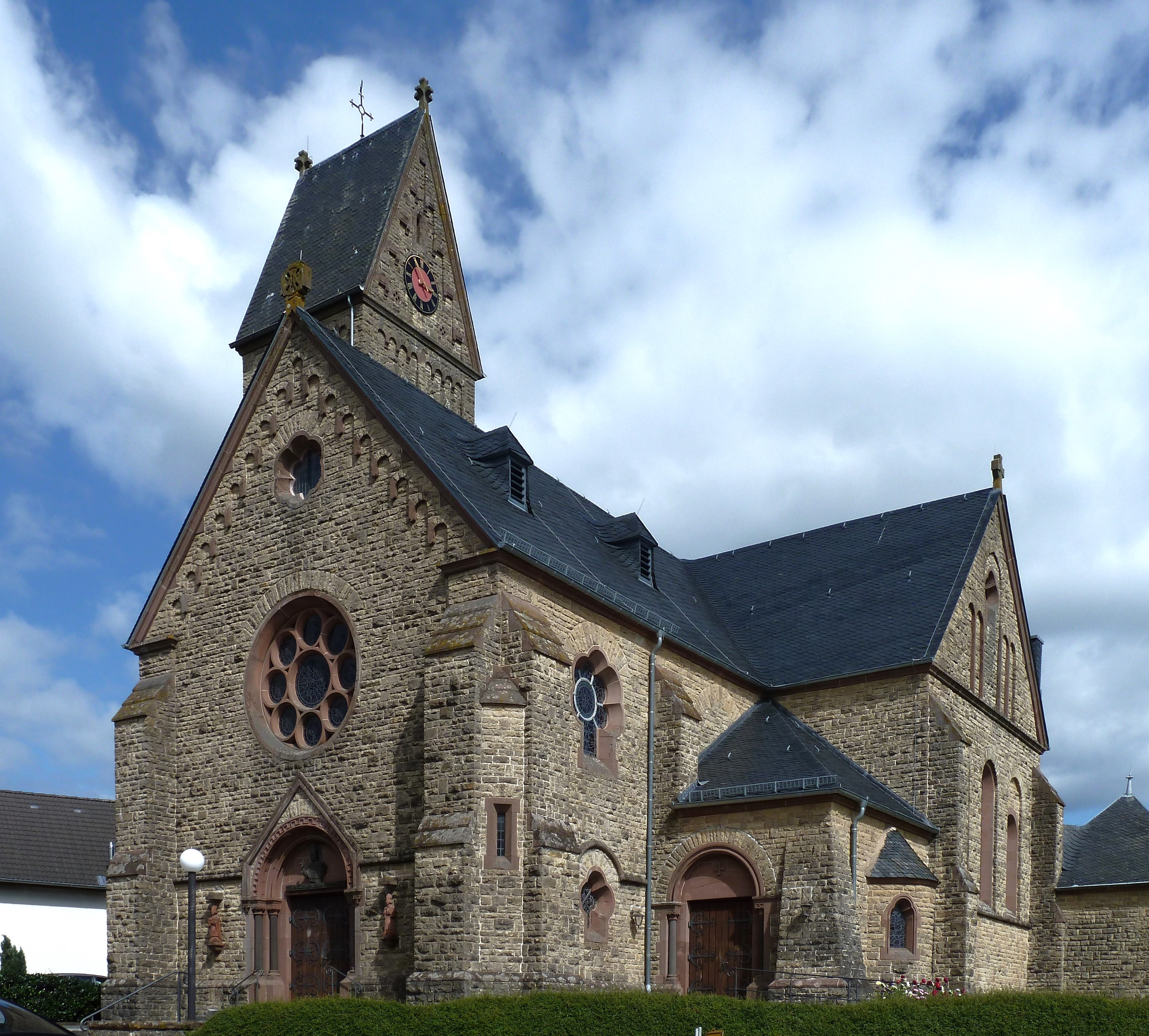
Badem, Catholic Parish Church of St. Eligius by cathedral master builder Julius Wirtz
