= Oberkail =

- Municipality
- Location of Oberkail within Eifelkreis Bitburg-Prüm district
- Interactive map of Oberkail
- Location within Germany Location within Rhineland-Palatinate
- Coordinates: 50°02′19″N 06°40′58″E
- Country: Germany
- State: Rhineland-Palatinate
- District: Eifelkreis Bitburg-Prüm
- Municipal assoc.: Bitburger Land

Government
  - Mayor (2019–24): Petra Fischer

Area
  - Total: 24.26 km^{2} (9.37 sq mi)
- Elevation: 360 m (1,180 ft)

Population (2025-12-31)
  - Total: 560
  - Density: 23/km^{2} (60/sq mi)
- Time zone: UTC+01:00 (CET)
  - Summer (DST): UTC+02:00 (CEST)
- Postal codes: 54533
- Dialling codes: 06567
- Vehicle registration: BIT
- Website: www.oberkail.de

Oberkail is a municipality in the rural area of Eifel in Rhineland-Palatinate in the administrative district Bitburg-Prüm and is part of Verbandsgemeinde ("collective municipality") Bitburger Land.

== Geography ==
The municipality is surrounded by grassland and forest in the natural landscape of the South Eifel. Next to Oberkail there are Seinsfeld, Gransdorf, Gindorf and Eisenschmitt. Nearby towns are Bitburg and Wittlich, both in 14 kilometers (about 9 miles) linear distance. Trier is about 30 kilometers (about 20 miles) away.

Oberkail is in the transition zone from oceanic climate to continental climate.

== History ==
In earlier times there was a large castle which was destroyed by French soldiers around 1794. Oberkail was mentioned for the first time in 1201, called "Hof zu Keyle".

The Spangdahlem Air Base is nearby.
