= Sulm =

Sulm or Sülm may refer to:

- Sulm (Germany), a river in Germany
- Sulm (Austria), a river in Austria
- Sülm, a municipality in Rhineland-Palatinate, Germany
- Sulm (Greyhawk), an ancient nation in the Dungeons & Dragons World of Greyhawk campaign setting
