= Mülbach =

German municipality

- Municipality
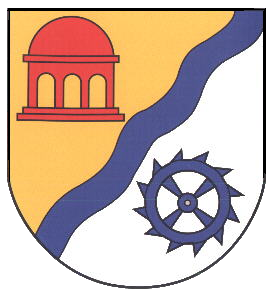
- Coat of arms

- Location of Mülbach within Eifelkreis Bitburg-Prüm district
- Interactive map of Mülbach
- Location within Germany Location within Rhineland-Palatinate
- Coordinates: 49°58′05″N 6°24′13″E
- Country: Germany
- State: Rhineland-Palatinate
- District: Eifelkreis Bitburg-Prüm
- Municipal assoc.: Bitburger Land

Government
  - Mayor (2019–24): Stefan Weil

Area
  - Total: 1.55 km^{2} (0.60 sq mi)
- Elevation: 270 m (890 ft)

Population (2025-12-31)
  - Total: 112
  - Density: 72.3/km^{2} (187/sq mi)
- Time zone: UTC+01:00 (CET)
  - Summer (DST): UTC+02:00 (CEST)
- Postal codes: 54636
- Dialling codes: 06527
- Vehicle registration: BIT
- Website: Mülbach at the Bitburger Land website www.bitburgerland.de

Mülbach is a municipality of Germany in the district of Bitburg-Prüm, in Rhineland-Palatinate. It is located in the west of the country and borders the South Eifel (German: Südeifel) nature park. The main settlement in the municipality is the village of Mülbach with a population of approximately 100 inhabitants.

== Location ==
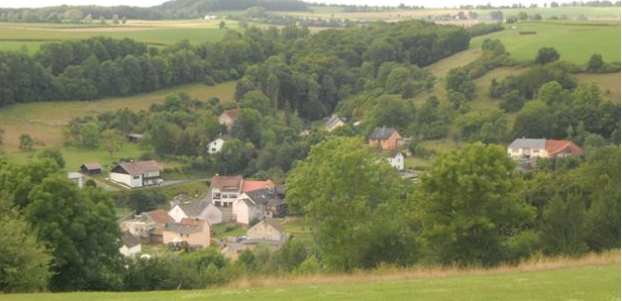
Village of Mülbach, Rhineland-Palatinate, Germany

The municipality of Mülbach is located between the villages of Oberweis and Baustert, approximately 10 kilometers from the towns of Bitburg and Mettendorf.

The village of Mülbach is located along the eponymous Mülbach (or Mühlenbach) stream in a valley running north–south at approximately 270 meters above sea level on the western edge of the Bitburger Gutland. The buildings in the village consist mainly of former farmsteads and two former mills, which have been converted into residential buildings. The Kapellenhof with its eponymous chapel is characteristic of the village. Located to the north-east of the village is Deltenhof farm. There is a community centre in the centre of the village, which also houses the fire station and serves as a community meeting place.

The nearest train station is in Erdorf, approximately 16 kilometres away.

== History ==
=== Early history and Roman influences ===
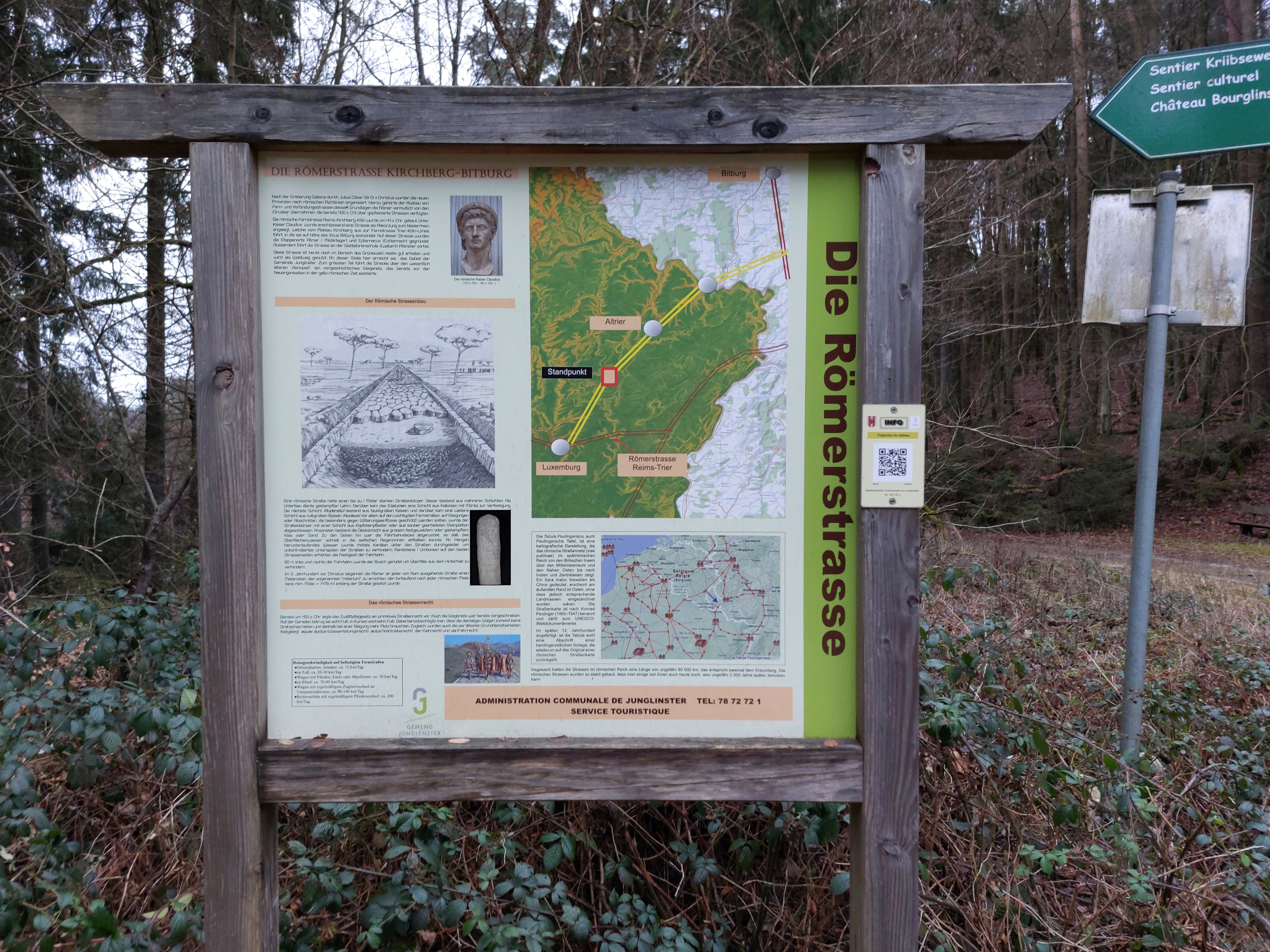
Sign marking the Roman road from Kirchberg to Bitburg

Archeological studies suggest that the Eifel region, including the Mülbach area, was part of the Roman Empire's extensive road system, in particular the Kiem road, which connected Augusta Treverorum (Trier) to Durocortorum (Reims). It was part of the Gallia Comata Roman province and later the Gallia Belgica. Evidence of Roman settlements in the nearby areas, particularly around Bitburg, points to the presence of early agricultural and trading hubs that influenced Mülbach's future role. Volcanic soils in the region, enriched by past eruptions, provided fertile land that encouraged early human settlement and farming activities. The first written mention of the village is documented from the year 1177, when it was known as "Molbach". The village belonged to the Luxembourg subprovince until 1325 and was then administered by the noble households of Bettingen and Neuerburg.

=== Political affiliation until the 19th century ===
Mülbach was part of the Holy Roman Empire, under the control of the Duchy of Luxembourg until the Personal union with the House of Habsburg when it became part of the Habsburg Netherlands in 1506. It became part of the Spanish Netherlands from 1556 until 1714. In 1714 control went back to the Habsburg monarchy under the Austrian Netherlands (1714–1794). Ownership of Mülbach in the 18th and early 19th centuries alternated between Austria and France. After the French Revolution and the Napoleonic Wars, the Dissolution of the Holy Roman Empire and the Congress of Vienna partitioned Luxembourg in 1815. With the second partitioning of Luxembourg Mülbach became part of Prussia with the transfer of the Rhineland.

The private chapel in Mülbach was built in 1876 by Dieter Diesburg, and their initials are carved on the chapel door arch.

=== 20th century ===
Under the terms of the Armistice of 11 November 1918 and the Treaty of Versailles of 1919, Mülbach was part of the Rhineland region occupied by Allied forces. The occupation, which lasted until 1930, was meant to provide security against any future German attack and serve as a guarantee for Germany's World War I reparations obligations.

In World War II the area was exposed to allied Strategic bombing raids targeting Bitburg. Mülbach was one of the points reached on the first day of the Allied invasion of Germany in 1944. At 5.30 a.m. on December 1, 1944, the Third Corps of the US Third Army, led by the 2nd Division, crossed the Luxembourg-German frontier and reached Mülbach that night, as part of its initial advance to a line stretching from Alfersteg to Konz via Winterscheid, Masthorn, Mulbach, Idenheim, Cordel, and Trier.

As a consequence of the Potsdam Conference, from 1945 to 1955 Mülbach was in one of four Allied zones, under French occupation. From the 1950s, only residential buildings were built in Neustraße. In the 1970s and 1980s residential buildings were also built in gaps between existing buildings. In the early 1980s the former cold store in the village was converted into a village community center used by clubs and residents. In 1992 an ongoing village renewal project was initiated.

Coat of arms, Mülbach, Rhineland-Palatinate, Germany

=== Coat of Arms ===
The coat of arms of Mülbach symbolizes the municipality through various representations. The Mühlenbach stream, flowing through the area, is depicted by blue wavy bars. A red temple stands on a yellow background, which highlights the connection to the Knights Templar who once resided in the area and also reflects the colors of the County of Manderscheid. A silver field with a blue mill wheel also recalls the village's historic mills and refers to the colours of neighbouring Luxembourg.

== Geography and Climate ==
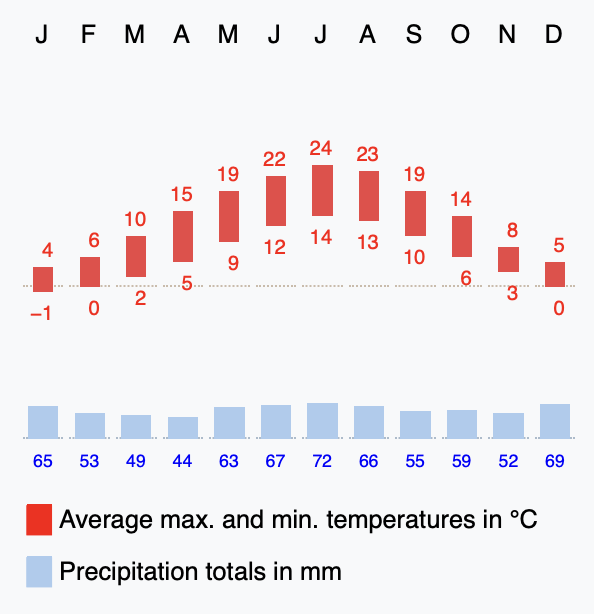
Monthly temperature averages and precipitation totals for Mülbach, Rhineland-Palatinate

=== Geography ===
The topography around Mülbach consists of rolling hills and valleys with diverse vegetation ranging from mixed woodlands to agricultural landscapes.

=== Climate ===
Mülbach experiences a temperate oceanic climate (Cfb under the Köppen climate classification), typical of the Eifel region. This climate is characterized by mild winters and moderate summers, with precipitation evenly distributed throughout the year. The nearby Eifel Mountains create cooler temperatures and higher rainfall in Mülbach compared to the surrounding lowlands.

==== Temperature ====
During the winter months, the average temperature is 0 °C (32 °F), occasionally dropping below freezing. Snowfall is infrequent but can occur in colder years, especially in the higher elevations of the Eifel. Summers in Mülbach are mild, with average temperatures ranging from 20 to 25 °C (68–77 °F), making the region ideal for agriculture and outdoor activities.

==== Precipitation ====
Annual precipitation levels are consistent, with moderate rainfall supporting the region's lush vegetation and agriculture. The region's volcanic soils, formed by historic eruptions, are particularly effective at retaining water, further enhancing the suitability of the land for farming. The absence of a distinct dry season benefits the mixed woodlands and agricultural fields surrounding the village.

==== Winds and Weather Variability ====
The hilly terrain around Mülbach leads to occasional strong winds, particularly during transitional seasons like autumn and spring. The location within the Eifel contributes to a mix of maritime and continental weather influences, resulting in variable but generally moderate climate conditions.

== Population ==
Mülbach's Population and Age Structure (2022)
Category	Subcategory	Number of people	percentage
Gender	Male	54	53%
	Female	48	47%
Age groups	0–17 years old	15	15%
	18–64 years old	61	60%
	65+ years old	26	25%
Religion	Roman Catholic	75	73%
	Prostesant	7	7%
	Other/no/unknown	20	20%
Citizenship	Germany	88	86%
	EU 27 (2020)	6	6%
	Other	8	8%

=== Demographics ===
During the 1990s and 2000s the population has been relatively stable, with minor fluctuations. Since 2016, the population has fallen below 100 due to deaths and emigration. According to population records, Mülbach had 107 inhabitants in 1990 increasing to 121 in 2001 and remaining at 121 in 2011. The 2022 census revealed a slight decline, bringing the number of inhabitants down to 102 from a peak of 121 recorded in 2011. This trend reflects the broader population challenges faced by rural communities in the Eifel region, including aging populations and urban migration.

The majority of Mülbach's population adheres to the Catholic faith. Many residents work in the nearby town of Bitburg or commute to Luxembourg.

== Economy and Land Use ==
=== Agriculture ===
Mülbach's total area is 155 hectares, of which approximately 80% is used for agricultural purposes, and a relatively small portion (approximately 5%) is forested, according to the State Statistical Office (as of December 31, 2018). The current regional development plan assigns Mülbach the special function of agriculture, with recent increases in the cultivation of maize for feed and biogas production. There are no longer any farms in the village. Most agricultural land is now leased to farms in neighboring communities, with the village increasingly focusing on residential development. As a result of these economic changes, the focus of land use in the village has shifted from agriculture to purely residential use.

== Politics ==
Mülbach complies to the Rhineland-Palatinate's legal and political system which acts within a framework of a federal parliamentary representative democratic republic, in which the Federal Government of Germany governs with certain powers reserved to the states of Germany including Rhineland-Palatinate.[19][20]

=== Municipal council ===
In September 2024, the Mülbach municipal council was made up of the following members: Stephan Koch as local mayor, Rainer Hermes, Tobias Müller, Günter Hammling, Ingrid Hammling and Christoph Kinnisch as councillors. Christoph Kinnisch also holds the office of first deputy, while Stefan Hühn is second deputy.

== Attractions ==
=== Hiking Trails ===
==== Circular hiking trail of the Southern Eifel Nature Park No. 73 ====
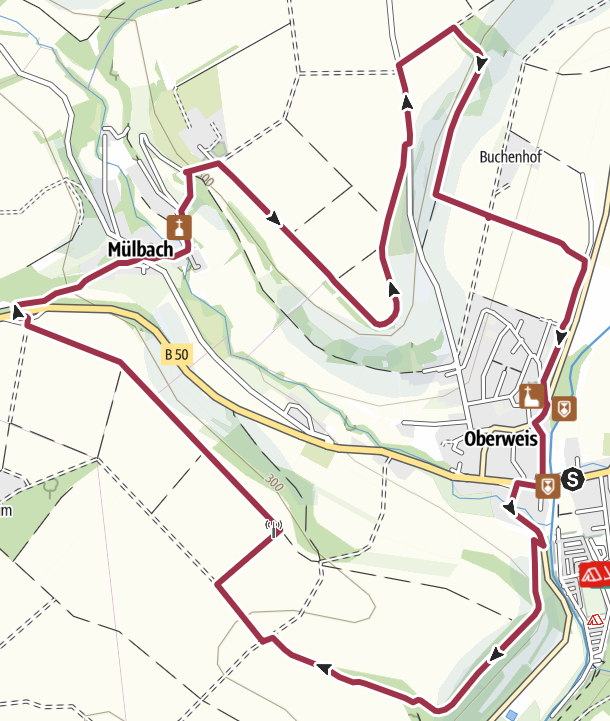
Map of the Circular hiking trail of the Southern Eifel Nature Park No. 73

The circular hiking trail in the Southern Eifel Nature Park begins in the local community of Oberweis (accessible from Bitburger Strasse, with available parking) and passes through the nearby community of Mülbach, before returning to Oberweis.

The trail is 8.2 Kilometers (5.1 miles) long, with 186 meters (610 feet) of ascent and 188 meters (617 feet) of descent. the highest point reached is 333 meters (1092 feet). The average duration is two hours and fifteen minutes. The trail is marked with a red number 73 on a white background, enabling hikers to navigate without the need for maps. Trail markings are present in both directions, making it possible for hikers to also start the trail from Mulbach.

The route traverses diverse landscapes, including forests, meadows, and cultivated fields, offering views of Mülbach, Oberweis, and their surroundings. The Prüm Valley, through which the trail passes, is notable for its wild orchids, wild herbs, elderberries, and sloes. The trail's surface includes sections of asphalt, natural paths, and gravel. Several rest areas and benches are situated along the route. The route also features cultural landmarks, including a small chapel built in 1876, which serves as a reminder of the village's historical ties to the Luxembourg province and its religious heritance.

==== Bitburger Land Oberweis- Mülbach-Baustert-Oberweis circular route ====
The Bitburger Land Circular Trails is 16.3 kilometers (10 miles), passing through the 3 settlements of Oberweis, Mulbach and Baustert. The main starting point is in Oberweis but it is possible to start from the other two towns. The trail is located in the South Eifel Park. The highest point is 351 meters (1151 meet) and the lowest is 218 meters (715 feet). The average duration is 4.5 hours.

=== Cycling Path ===
==== Cycle path on railroad line ====
The "Cycle Path on Railroad Line" is a moderately challenging mountain bike trail requiring a reasonable level of fitness and advanced riding skills. The trail, a 37 km loop, typically starts in Baustert but can be accessed from any of the towns along its route, including Mülbach.

The trail features a variety of surfaces:

- 1.52 km of natural terrain
- 7.54 km of unpaved paths
- 1.82 km of gravel
- 9.31 km of paved roads
- 16.8 km of asphalt

A section of the route, between Messerich and Masholder, follows a repurposed railway line converted into a bike path that weaves through local vegetation. Notable landmarks along the way include an old shrine located at a crossroads in Masholder.

The trail passes through several towns, including Oberweis, Brect, Stahl, and Bettingen, offering the sight of various landscapes and environments. Riders can expect a mix of ascents and descents, with the highest point reaching an altitude of 372 meters at the 35 kilometers mark. The trail typically takes around 2.45 minutes to complete.

== See also ==
- Baustert - A municipality in the Eifel region of Rhineland-Palatinate, Germany
- List of towns and cities in Germany - A list of urban settlements across Germany
- Niersbach - A stream in the Rhineland-Palatinate region
- Rhineland-Palatinate - A federal state in western Germany
- South Eifel - A geographical and cultural region located in the southern part of the Eifel mountain range in Germany
