= Bitburger Land =

- Verbandsgemeinde
- Location of Bitburger Land within Bitburg-Prüm district
- Interactive map of Bitburger Land
- Location within Germany Location within Rhineland-Palatinate
- Coordinates: 49°58′N 6°31′E
- Country: Germany
- State: Rhineland-Palatinate
- District: Bitburg-Prüm
- Seat: Bitburg
- Subdivisions: 71 municipalities

Area
  - Total: 429.4 km^{2} (165.8 sq mi)

Population (2025-12-31)
  - Total: 25,208
  - Density: 58.71/km^{2} (152.0/sq mi)
- Time zone: UTC+01:00 (CET)
  - Summer (DST): UTC+02:00 (CEST)
- Website: bitburgerland.de

Bitburger Land is a Verbandsgemeinde ("collective municipality") in the district Bitburg-Prüm, in Rhineland-Palatinate, Germany. The seat of the Verbandsgemeinde is in Bitburg, itself not part of the Verbandsgemeinde. It was formed on 1 July 2014 by the merger of the former Verbandsgemeinden Bitburg-Land and Kyllburg.

The Verbandsgemeinde Bitburger Land consists of the following Ortsgemeinden ("local municipalities"):

1. Badem
2. Balesfeld
3. Baustert
4. Bettingen
5. Bickendorf
6. Biersdorf am See
7. Birtlingen
8. Brecht
9. Brimingen
10. Burbach
11. Dahlem
12. Dockendorf
13. Dudeldorf
14. Echtershausen
15. Ehlenz
16. Enzen
17. Eßlingen
18. Etteldorf
19. Feilsdorf
20. Fließem
21. Gindorf
22. Gondorf
23. Gransdorf
24. Halsdorf
25. Hamm
26. Heilenbach
27. Hütterscheid
28. Hüttingen an der Kyll
29. Idenheim
30. Idesheim
31. Ingendorf
32. Kyllburg
33. Kyllburgweiler
34. Ließem
35. Malberg
36. Malbergweich
37. Meckel
38. Messerich
39. Metterich
40. Mülbach
41. Nattenheim
42. Neidenbach
43. Neuheilenbach
44. Niederstedem
45. Niederweiler
46. Oberkail
47. Oberstedem
48. Oberweiler
49. Oberweis
50. Olsdorf
51. Orsfeld
52. Pickließem
53. Rittersdorf
54. Röhl
55. Sankt Thomas
56. Scharfbillig
57. Schleid
58. Seffern
59. Sefferweich
60. Seinsfeld
61. Steinborn
62. Stockem
63. Sülm
64. Trimport
65. Usch
66. Wettlingen
67. Wiersdorf
68. Wilsecker
69. Wißmannsdorf
70. Wolsfeld
71. Zendscheid
