= Gondorf =

Gondorf may refer to:

- Gondorf (municipality), in Rhineland-Palatinate, western Germany
- Jérôme Gondorf (born 1988), German footballer

== See also ==
- Kobern-Gondorf
