= Niederweiler =

Niederweiler may refer to the following places in Germany:

- Niederweiler, Bitburg-Prüm
- Niederweiler, Rhein-Hunsrück

It is also the German form of Niderviller in Alsace-Lorraine, which has been in Germany at various times.
