= Dockendorf =

- Municipality
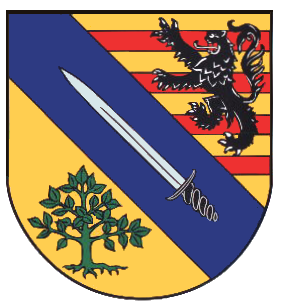
- Coat of arms

- Location of Dockendorf within Eifelkreis Bitburg-Prüm district
- Interactive map of Dockendorf
- Location within Germany Location within Rhineland-Palatinate
- Coordinates: 49°55′33″N 06°27′26″E
- Country: Germany
- State: Rhineland-Palatinate
- District: Eifelkreis Bitburg-Prüm
- Municipal assoc.: Bitburger Land

Government
  - Mayor (2019–24): Stefan Rodens

Area
  - Total: 5.82 km^{2} (2.25 sq mi)
- Elevation: 253 m (830 ft)

Population (2025-12-31)
  - Total: 215
  - Density: 36.9/km^{2} (95.7/sq mi)
- Time zone: UTC+01:00 (CET)
  - Summer (DST): UTC+02:00 (CEST)
- Postal codes: 54636
- Dialling codes: 06568
- Vehicle registration: BIT
- Website: Dockendorf at the Bitburger Land website www.bitburgerland.de

Dockendorf (German pronunciation: [ˈdɔkn̩ˌdɔʁf]) is a municipality in the district of Bitburg-Prüm, in Rhineland-Palatinate, western Germany.

== Geography ==
The town lies in the South Eifel region, approximately 10 km southwest of Bitburg. It is situated in the west edge of the Nims valley and a brook that leads to the Nims flows through the town. The highest point of the municipality is the "Großenbüsch" at 379 meters above sea level, the lowest point is the Dockendorf Mill at 225 meters above sea level. 60% of the 5.82 km^{2} municipality is used for agriculture, and 30% is covered by forest.

== History ==
The town in its current form most likely arose from the time of the capture of the land by the Frankish Empire. However, the Romans had already settled parts of the area, as evidenced by remnants of a tower castle near the Dockendorf mill. The first documented reference to Dockendorf occurred in 1270. For many years, the municipality belonged to the Luxembourgish Propstei of Bitburg and since 1816 to the Prussian Bitburg-Prüm district. During the French period, Dockendorf was the mairie, which later became the office of the mayor (Bürgermeisterei). This expanded to include the municipality of Wolsfeld, and in 1970, these plus four other municipalities were combined as the result of communal reform to join the Bitburg-Prüm Verbandsgemeinde.

== Municipal Council ==
The municipal council of Dockendorf consists of six councilors elected by the local plurality election in Rhineland-Palatinate on May 25, 2014.

== Attractions ==
Throughout the municipality lie many landmark farmhouses from the 18th and 19th centuries. The most important structures in Dockendorf include the Forest Chapel (Waldkapelle), the parish church, and the old rectory, which exhibits four different architectural styles. The rectory has been restored both inside and out and is an important regional cultural monument. Between the 17th and 19th centuries, a total of five calvaries were built in the district. The nearby "Scharren bei Dockendorf" nature reserve hosts a selection of rare plant species.

== Economy ==
Dockendorf is an extremely agriculture-dependent municipality, supporting both full-time and part-time farming operations. In the last few years, the amount of agriculturally-suitable land has grown in comparison to neighboring municipalities. In addition, both a construction company and a distillery have begun operations in Dockendorf. Nonetheless, most working residents living in Dockendorf commute to Trier, Bitburg, or Luxembourg.

The Bundesstraße 257 lies one kilometer east of Dockendorf and connects the town with the Bundesautobahn 60 in Bitburg, 10 km away.
