= Oberstedem =

- Municipality
- Coat of arms

- Location of Oberstedem within Eifelkreis Bitburg-Prüm district
- Interactive map of Oberstedem
- Location within Germany Location within Rhineland-Palatinate
- Coordinates: 49°55′57″N 6°30′30″E
- Country: Germany
- State: Rhineland-Palatinate
- District: Eifelkreis Bitburg-Prüm
- Municipal assoc.: Bitburger Land

Government
  - Mayor (2019–24): Peter Endres

Area
  - Total: 4.48 km^{2} (1.73 sq mi)
- Elevation: 298 m (978 ft)

Population (2025-12-31)
  - Total: 72
  - Density: 16/km^{2} (42/sq mi)
- Time zone: UTC+01:00 (CET)
  - Summer (DST): UTC+02:00 (CEST)
- Postal codes: 54634
- Dialling codes: 06568
- Vehicle registration: BIT
- Website: Oberstedem at the Bitburger Land website www.bitburgerland.de

Oberstedem is a municipality in the district of Bitburg-Prüm, in Rhineland-Palatinate, western Germany.
