= Malbergweich =

- Municipality
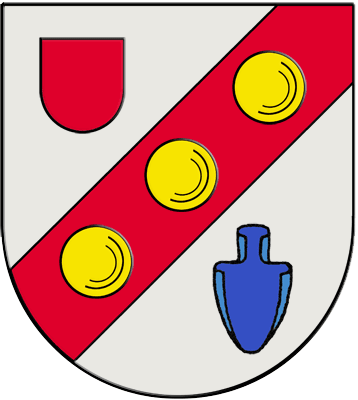
- Coat of arms

- Location of Malbergweich within Eifelkreis Bitburg-Prüm district
- Interactive map of Malbergweich
- Location within Germany Location within Rhineland-Palatinate
- Coordinates: 50°3′N 6°33′E
- Country: Germany
- State: Rhineland-Palatinate
- District: Eifelkreis Bitburg-Prüm
- Municipal assoc.: Bitburger Land

Government
  - Mayor (2019–24): Klara Leisen

Area
  - Total: 10.22 km^{2} (3.95 sq mi)
- Elevation: 402 m (1,319 ft)

Population (2025-12-31)
  - Total: 375
  - Density: 36.7/km^{2} (95.0/sq mi)
- Time zone: UTC+01:00 (CET)
  - Summer (DST): UTC+02:00 (CEST)
- Postal codes: 54655
- Dialling codes: 06563
- Vehicle registration: BIT
- Website: www.malbergweich.de

Malbergweich is a municipality in the district of Bitburg-Prüm, in Rhineland-Palatinate, western Germany.
