= Enzen =

- Municipality
- Coat of arms

- Location of Enzen within Eifelkreis Bitburg-Prüm district
- Interactive map of Enzen
- Location within Germany Location within Rhineland-Palatinate
- Coordinates: 49°55′18″N 06°22′10″E
- Country: Germany
- State: Rhineland-Palatinate
- District: Eifelkreis Bitburg-Prüm
- Municipal assoc.: Bitburger Land

Government
  - Mayor (2019–24): Manfred Elsen

Area
  - Total: 1.71 km^{2} (0.66 sq mi)
- Elevation: 230 m (750 ft)

Population (2025-12-31)
  - Total: 31
  - Density: 18/km^{2} (47/sq mi)
- Time zone: UTC+01:00 (CET)
  - Summer (DST): UTC+02:00 (CEST)
- Postal codes: 54646
- Dialling codes: 06522
- Vehicle registration: BIT
- Website: Enzen at the Bitburger Land website www.bitburgerland.de

Enzen (German pronunciation: [ˈɛntsn̩]) is a municipality in the district of Bitburg-Prüm, in Rhineland-Palatinate, western Germany.
