= Feilsdorf =

- Municipality
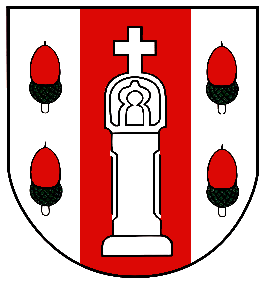
- Coat of arms

- Location of Feilsdorf within Eifelkreis Bitburg-Prüm district
- Interactive map of Feilsdorf
- Location within Germany Location within Rhineland-Palatinate
- Coordinates: 49°59′25″N 06°24′25″E
- Country: Germany
- State: Rhineland-Palatinate
- District: Eifelkreis Bitburg-Prüm
- Municipal assoc.: Bitburger Land

Government
  - Mayor (2019–24): Martin Winter

Area
  - Total: 3.80 km^{2} (1.47 sq mi)
- Elevation: 370 m (1,210 ft)

Population (2025-12-31)
  - Total: 30
  - Density: 7.9/km^{2} (20/sq mi)
- Time zone: UTC+01:00 (CET)
  - Summer (DST): UTC+02:00 (CEST)
- Postal codes: 54636
- Dialling codes: 06527
- Vehicle registration: KH
- Website: Feilsdorf at the Bitburger Land website www.bitburgerland.de

Feilsdorf is a municipality in the district of Bitburg-Prüm, in Rhineland-Palatinate, western Germany.
