= Olsdorf =

- Municipality
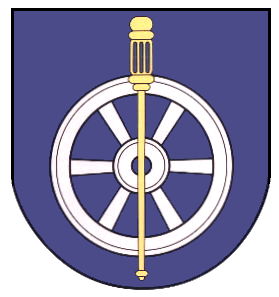
- Coat of arms

- Location of Olsdorf within Eifelkreis Bitburg-Prüm district
- Interactive map of Olsdorf
- Location within Germany Location within Rhineland-Palatinate
- Coordinates: 49°57′20″N 6°23′00″E
- Country: Germany
- State: Rhineland-Palatinate
- District: Eifelkreis Bitburg-Prüm
- Municipal assoc.: Bitburger Land

Government
  - Mayor (2019–24): Patrick Adolph

Area
  - Total: 3.14 km^{2} (1.21 sq mi)
- Elevation: 350 m (1,150 ft)

Population (2025-12-31)
  - Total: 89
  - Density: 28/km^{2} (73/sq mi)
- Time zone: UTC+01:00 (CET)
  - Summer (DST): UTC+02:00 (CEST)
- Postal codes: 54646
- Dialling codes: 06527
- Vehicle registration: BIT
- Website: Olsdorf at the Bitburger Land website www.bitburgerland.de

Olsdorf is a municipality in the district of Bitburg-Prüm, in Rhineland-Palatinate, western Germany.
