= Schleid, Rhineland-Palatinate =

Schleid
- Municipality
- Coat of arms

- Location of Schleid within Eifelkreis Bitburg-Prüm district
- Interactive map of Schleid
- Location within Germany Location within Rhineland-Palatinate
- Coordinates: 50°03′34″N 6°29′30″E
- Country: Germany
- State: Rhineland-Palatinate
- District: Eifelkreis Bitburg-Prüm
- Municipal assoc.: Bitburger Land

Government
  - Mayor (2019–24): Stephan Grengs

Area
  - Total: 6.24 km^{2} (2.41 sq mi)
- Elevation: 378 m (1,240 ft)

Population (2025-12-31)
  - Total: 360
  - Density: 58/km^{2} (150/sq mi)
- Time zone: UTC+01:00 (CET)
  - Summer (DST): UTC+02:00 (CEST)
- Postal codes: 54636
- Dialling codes: 06569
- Vehicle registration: BIT
- Website: Schleid at the Bitburger Land website www.bitburgerland.de

Schleid (German pronunciation: [ʃlaɪt]) is a municipality in the district of Bitburg-Prüm, in Rhineland-Palatinate, western Germany.
