= Echtershausen =

- Municipality
- Coat of arms

- Location of Echtershausen within Eifelkreis Bitburg-Prüm district
- Interactive map of Echtershausen
- Location within Germany Location within Rhineland-Palatinate
- Coordinates: 50°01′20″N 06°25′3″E
- Country: Germany
- State: Rhineland-Palatinate
- District: Eifelkreis Bitburg-Prüm
- Municipal assoc.: Bitburger Land

Government
  - Mayor (2019–24): Norbert Fleckner

Area
  - Total: 2.49 km^{2} (0.96 sq mi)
- Elevation: 290 m (950 ft)

Population (2025-12-31)
  - Total: 87
  - Density: 35/km^{2} (90/sq mi)
- Time zone: UTC+01:00 (CET)
  - Summer (DST): UTC+02:00 (CEST)
- Postal codes: 54636
- Dialling codes: 06569
- Vehicle registration: BIT
- Website: Echtershausen at the Bitburger Land website www.bitburgerland.de

Echtershausen is a municipality in the district of Bitburg-Prüm, in Rhineland-Palatinate, western Germany.
