= Trimport =

- Municipality
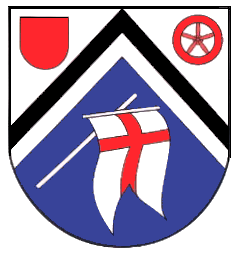
- Coat of arms

- Location of Trimport within Eifelkreis Bitburg-Prüm district
- Interactive map of Trimport
- Location within Germany Location within Rhineland-Palatinate
- Coordinates: 49°54′34″N 06°34′33″E
- Country: Germany
- State: Rhineland-Palatinate
- District: Eifelkreis Bitburg-Prüm
- Municipal assoc.: Bitburger Land

Government
  - Mayor (2019–24): Wilfried Haller

Area
  - Total: 2.19 km^{2} (0.85 sq mi)
- Elevation: 315 m (1,033 ft)

Population (2025-12-31)
  - Total: 298
  - Density: 136/km^{2} (352/sq mi)
- Time zone: UTC+01:00 (CET)
  - Summer (DST): UTC+02:00 (CEST)
- Postal codes: 54636
- Dialling codes: 06562
- Vehicle registration: BIT
- Website: www.trimport.de

Trimport is a municipality in the district of Bitburg-Prüm, in Rhineland-Palatinate, western Germany.
