= Eßlingen =

Place in Rhineland-Palatinate, Germany

- Municipality
- Coat of arms

- Location of Eßlingen within Eifelkreis Bitburg-Prüm district
- Interactive map of Eßlingen
- Location within Germany Location within Rhineland-Palatinate
- Coordinates: 49°54′53″N 6°31′38″E
- Country: Germany
- State: Rhineland-Palatinate
- District: Eifelkreis Bitburg-Prüm
- Municipal assoc.: Bitburger Land

Government
  - Mayor (2019–24): Anna Kewes

Area
  - Total: 5.26 km^{2} (2.03 sq mi)
- Elevation: 320 m (1,050 ft)

Population (2025-12-31)
  - Total: 120
  - Density: 23/km^{2} (59/sq mi)
- Time zone: UTC+01:00 (CET)
  - Summer (DST): UTC+02:00 (CEST)
- Postal codes: 54636
- Dialling codes: 06568
- Vehicle registration: BIT
- Website: Eßlingen at the Bitburger Land website www.bitburgerland.de

Eßlingen (German pronunciation: [ˈɛslɪŋən]) is a municipality in the district of Bitburg-Prüm, in Rhineland-Palatinate, western Germany.
