= Hütterscheid =

- Municipality
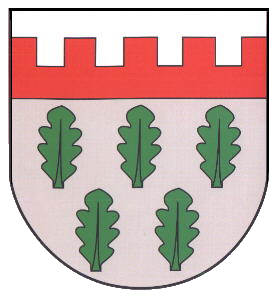
- Coat of arms

- Location of Hütterscheid within Eifelkreis Bitburg-Prüm district
- Interactive map of Hütterscheid
- Location within Germany Location within Rhineland-Palatinate
- Coordinates: 49°59′51″N 06°23′18″E
- Country: Germany
- State: Rhineland-Palatinate
- District: Eifelkreis Bitburg-Prüm
- Municipal assoc.: Bitburger Land

Government
  - Mayor (2019–24): Andreas Girards

Area
  - Total: 2.99 km^{2} (1.15 sq mi)
- Elevation: 350 m (1,150 ft)

Population (2025-12-31)
  - Total: 159
  - Density: 53.2/km^{2} (138/sq mi)
- Time zone: UTC+01:00 (CET)
  - Summer (DST): UTC+02:00 (CEST)
- Postal codes: 54636
- Dialling codes: 06527
- Vehicle registration: BIT
- Website: Hütterscheid at the Bitburger Land website www.bitburgerland.de

Hütterscheid is a municipality in the district of Bitburg-Prüm, in Rhineland-Palatinate, Germany.
