= Rittersdorf, Rhineland-Palatinate =

Rittersdorf
- Municipality
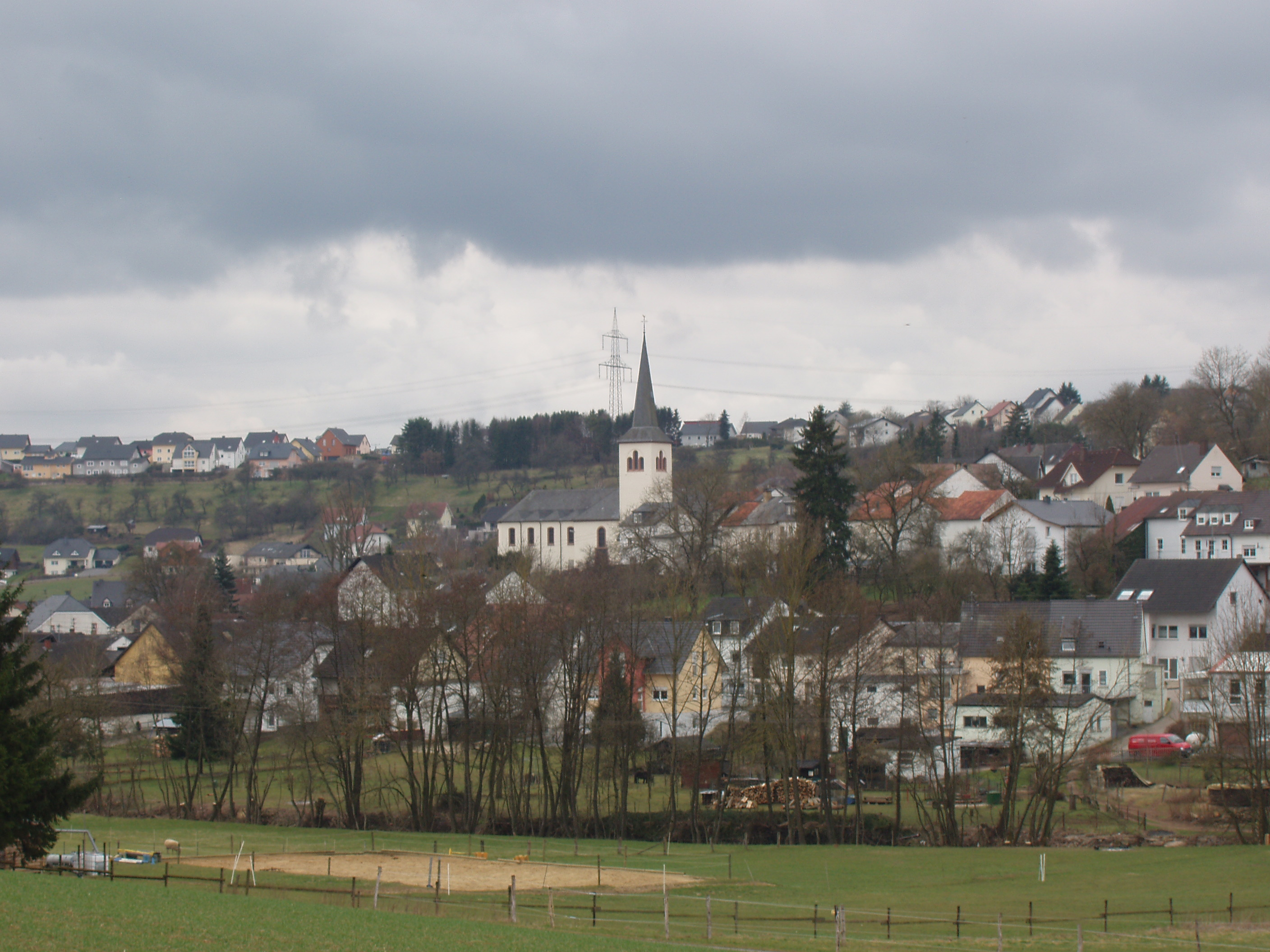

- Coat of arms

- Location of Rittersdorf within Eifelkreis Bitburg-Prüm district
- Interactive map of Rittersdorf
- Location within Germany Location within Rhineland-Palatinate
- Coordinates: 49°59′52″N 06°29′45″E
- Country: Germany
- State: Rhineland-Palatinate
- District: Eifelkreis Bitburg-Prüm
- Municipal assoc.: Bitburger Land

Government
  - Mayor (2019–24): Holger Klein (CDU)

Area
  - Total: 11.87 km^{2} (4.58 sq mi)
- Elevation: 285 m (935 ft)

Population (2025-12-31)
  - Total: 1,273
  - Density: 107.2/km^{2} (277.8/sq mi)
- Time zone: UTC+01:00 (CET)
  - Summer (DST): UTC+02:00 (CEST)
- Postal codes: 54636
- Dialling codes: 06561
- Vehicle registration: BIT
- Website: Rittersdorf at the Bitburger Land website www.bitburgerland.de

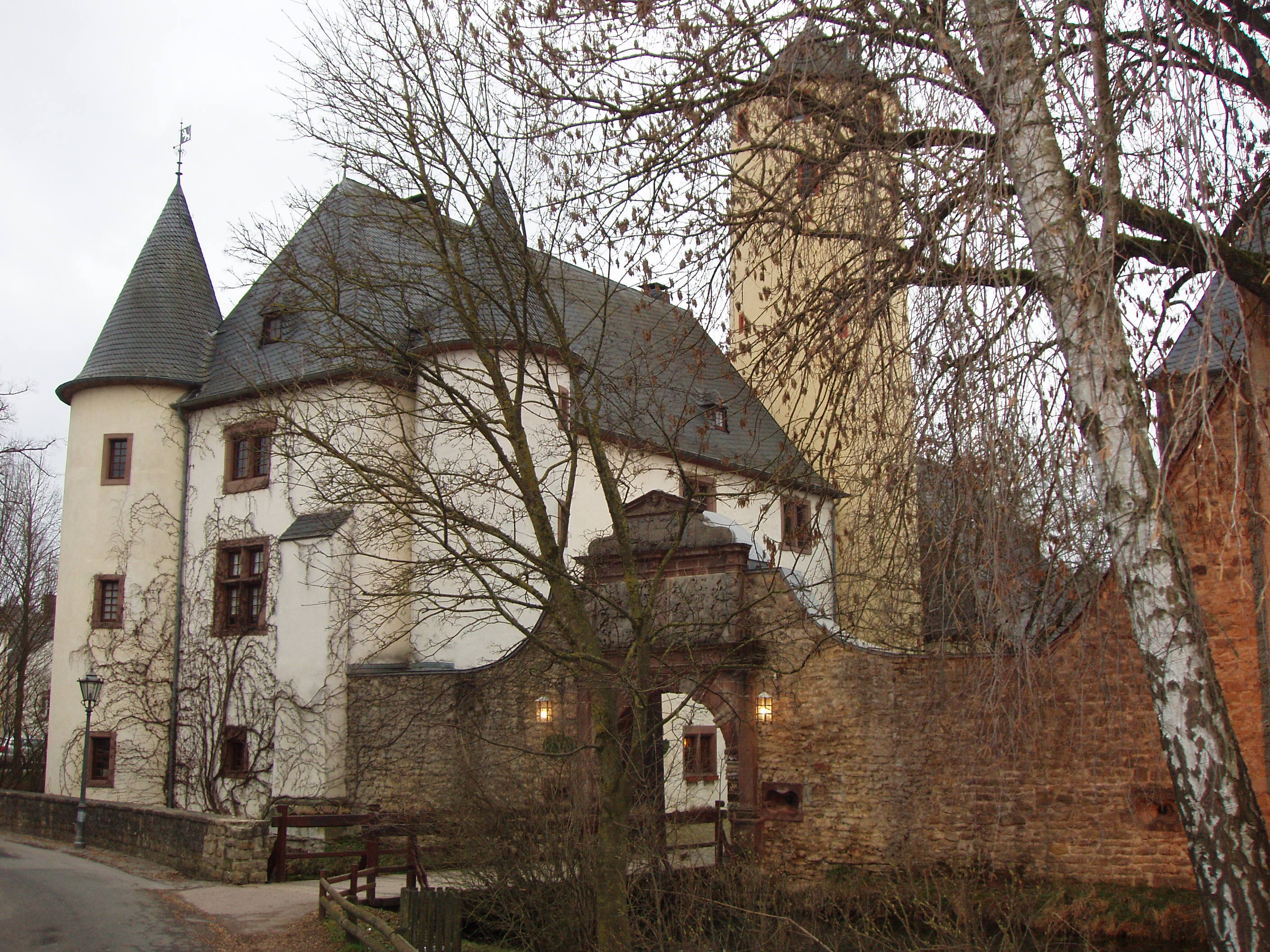
Rittersdorf Castle

Rittersdorf is a municipality in the district of Bitburg-Prüm, in Rhineland-Palatinate, western Germany, a few miles from Bitburg.

The tenth-century Burg Rittersdorf (Rittersdorf Castle) in Rittersdorf nowadays houses a restaurant and a small museum.
