= Usch =

- Municipality
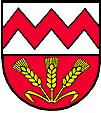
- Coat of arms

- Location of Usch within Eifelkreis Bitburg-Prüm district
- Interactive map of Usch
- Location within Germany Location within Rhineland-Palatinate
- Coordinates: 50°06′19″N 6°36′8″E
- Country: Germany
- State: Rhineland-Palatinate
- District: Eifelkreis Bitburg-Prüm
- Municipal assoc.: Bitburger Land

Government
  - Mayor (2019–24): Theo Dimmer

Area
  - Total: 1.33 km^{2} (0.51 sq mi)
- Elevation: 328 m (1,076 ft)

Population (2025-12-31)
  - Total: 55
  - Density: 41/km^{2} (110/sq mi)
- Time zone: UTC+01:00 (CET)
  - Summer (DST): UTC+02:00 (CEST)
- Postal codes: 54655
- Dialling codes: 06594
- Vehicle registration: BIT
- Website: www.usch-eifel.de

Usch is a municipality in the district of Bitburg-Prüm, in Rhineland-Palatinate, western Germany.
