= Neidenbach =

- Municipality
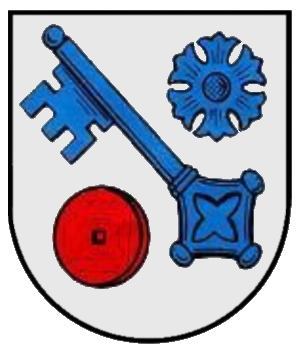
- Coat of arms

- Location of Neidenbach within Eifelkreis Bitburg-Prüm district
- Interactive map of Neidenbach
- Location within Germany Location within Rhineland-Palatinate
- Coordinates: 50°05′34″N 6°33′08″E
- Country: Germany
- State: Rhineland-Palatinate
- District: Eifelkreis Bitburg-Prüm
- Municipal assoc.: Bitburger Land

Government
  - Mayor (2019–24): Edwin Mattes

Area
  - Total: 9.35 km^{2} (3.61 sq mi)
- Elevation: 470 m (1,540 ft)

Population (2025-12-31)
  - Total: 838
  - Density: 89.6/km^{2} (232/sq mi)
- Time zone: UTC+01:00 (CET)
  - Summer (DST): UTC+02:00 (CEST)
- Postal codes: 54657
- Dialling codes: 06563
- Vehicle registration: BIT
- Website: www.neidenbach.de

Neidenbach is a municipality in the district of Bitburg-Prüm, in Rhineland-Palatinate, western Germany.

== Geography ==
Neidenbach lies about 45 km north of the city of Trier in the Kyllburger Waldeifel region. Within its municipality are the hamlet of Erntehof 2.5 km northwest of the village and the settlements of Koppenweg, Maierhof, Nickelshof and Am Wasserfall.
