= Scharfbillig =

- Municipality
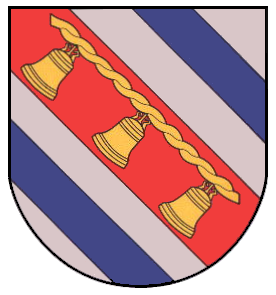
- Coat of arms

- Location of Scharfbillig within Eifelkreis Bitburg-Prüm district
- Interactive map of Scharfbillig
- Location within Germany Location within Rhineland-Palatinate
- Coordinates: 49°55′50″N 06°33′23″E
- Country: Germany
- State: Rhineland-Palatinate
- District: Eifelkreis Bitburg-Prüm
- Municipal assoc.: Bitburger Land

Government
  - Mayor (2019–24): Anna Hansen

Area
  - Total: 4.82 km^{2} (1.86 sq mi)
- Elevation: 360 m (1,180 ft)

Population (2025-12-31)
  - Total: 141
  - Density: 29.3/km^{2} (75.8/sq mi)
- Time zone: UTC+01:00 (CET)
  - Summer (DST): UTC+02:00 (CEST)
- Postal codes: 54636
- Dialling codes: 06561
- Vehicle registration: BIT
- Website: Scharfbillig at the Bitburger Land website www.bitburgerland.de

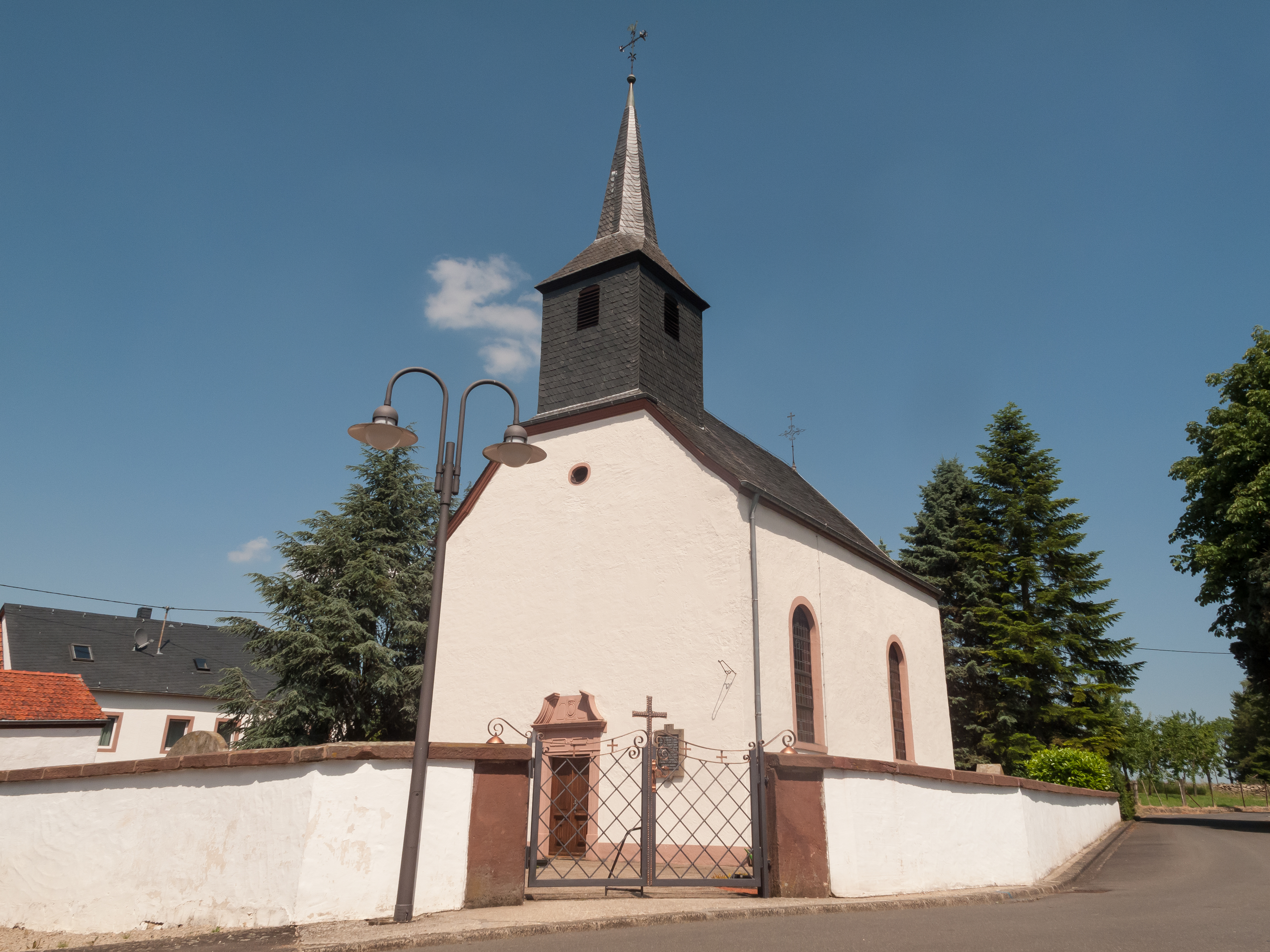
Scharfbillig, Catholic subsidiary church Sankt Lukas

Scharfbillig is a municipality in the district of Bitburg-Prüm, in Rhineland-Palatinate, western Germany.
