= Etteldorf =

- Municipality
- Location of Etteldorf within Eifelkreis Bitburg-Prüm district
- Interactive map of Etteldorf
- Location within Germany Location within Rhineland-Palatinate
- Coordinates: 50°01′50″N 06°34′23″E
- Country: Germany
- State: Rhineland-Palatinate
- District: Eifelkreis Bitburg-Prüm
- Municipal assoc.: Bitburger Land

Government
  - Mayor (2019–24): Norbert Crames

Area
  - Total: 1.74 km^{2} (0.67 sq mi)
- Elevation: 360 m (1,180 ft)

Population (2025-12-31)
  - Total: 22
  - Density: 13/km^{2} (33/sq mi)
- Time zone: UTC+01:00 (CET)
  - Summer (DST): UTC+02:00 (CEST)
- Postal codes: 54655
- Dialling codes: 06563
- Vehicle registration: BIT
- Website: Etteldorf at the Bitburger Land website www.bitburgerland.de

Etteldorf is a municipality in the district of Bitburg-Prüm, in Rhineland-Palatinate, western Germany.
