= Wißmannsdorf =

- Municipality
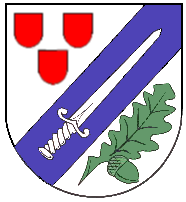
- Coat of arms

- Location of Wißmannsdorf within Eifelkreis Bitburg-Prüm district
- Interactive map of Wißmannsdorf
- Location within Germany Location within Rhineland-Palatinate
- Coordinates: 49°59′16″N 06°26′37″E
- Country: Germany
- State: Rhineland-Palatinate
- District: Eifelkreis Bitburg-Prüm
- Municipal assoc.: Bitburger Land
- Subdivisions: 3

Government
  - Mayor (2019–24): Rudolf Winter

Area
  - Total: 6.72 km^{2} (2.59 sq mi)
- Elevation: 240 m (790 ft)

Population (2025-12-31)
  - Total: 782
  - Density: 116/km^{2} (301/sq mi)
- Time zone: UTC+01:00 (CET)
  - Summer (DST): UTC+02:00 (CEST)
- Postal codes: 54636
- Dialling codes: 06527
- Vehicle registration: BIT
- Website: Wißmannsdorf at the Bitburger Land website

Wißmannsdorf is a municipality in the district of Bitburg-Prüm, in Rhineland-Palatinate, western Germany.

The municipality is written with an ß, which may be replaced by ss if not available (Wissmannsdorf).
