= Malberg, Bitburg-Prüm =

Malberg
- Municipality
- Coat of arms

- Location of Malberg within Eifelkreis Bitburg-Prüm district
- Interactive map of Malberg
- Location within Germany Location within Rhineland-Palatinate
- Coordinates: 50°2′48″N 6°34′49″E
- Country: Germany
- State: Rhineland-Palatinate
- District: Eifelkreis Bitburg-Prüm
- Municipal assoc.: Bitburger Land

Government
  - Mayor (2019–24): Sabine Buhr

Area
  - Total: 6.60 km^{2} (2.55 sq mi)
- Elevation: 280 m (920 ft)

Population (2025-12-31)
  - Total: 554
  - Density: 83.9/km^{2} (217/sq mi)
- Time zone: UTC+01:00 (CET)
  - Summer (DST): UTC+02:00 (CEST)
- Postal codes: 54655
- Dialling codes: 06563
- Vehicle registration: BIT
- Website: malberg-eifel.de

Malberg (German pronunciation: [ˈmaːlˌbɛʁk]) is a municipality in the district of Bitburg-Prüm, in Rhineland-Palatinate, western Germany.
