= Kyllburgweiler =

- Municipality
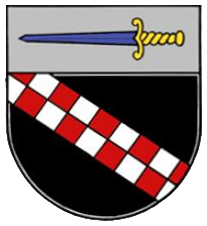
- Coat of arms

- Location of Kyllburgweiler within Eifelkreis Bitburg-Prüm district
- Interactive map of Kyllburgweiler
- Location within Germany Location within Rhineland-Palatinate
- Coordinates: 50°03′5″N 6°37′15″E
- Country: Germany
- State: Rhineland-Palatinate
- District: Eifelkreis Bitburg-Prüm
- Municipal assoc.: Bitburger Land

Government
  - Mayor (2019–24): Christiane Schwinnen

Area
  - Total: 7.26 km^{2} (2.80 sq mi)
- Elevation: 340 m (1,120 ft)

Population (2025-12-31)
  - Total: 88
  - Density: 12/km^{2} (31/sq mi)
- Time zone: UTC+01:00 (CET)
  - Summer (DST): UTC+02:00 (CEST)
- Postal codes: 54655
- Dialling codes: 06563
- Vehicle registration: BIT
- Website: Kyllburgweiler at the Bitburger Land website www.bitburgerland.de

Kyllburgweiler is a municipality in the district of Bitburg-Prüm, in Rhineland-Palatinate, Germany.
