= Ingendorf =

- Municipality
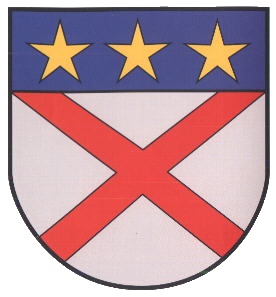
- Coat of arms

- Location of Ingendorf within Eifelkreis Bitburg-Prüm district
- Interactive map of Ingendorf
- Location within Germany Location within Rhineland-Palatinate
- Coordinates: 49°56′02″N 6°27′22″E
- Country: Germany
- State: Rhineland-Palatinate
- District: Eifelkreis Bitburg-Prüm
- Municipal assoc.: Bitburger Land

Government
  - Mayor (2019–24): Dirk Wagner

Area
  - Total: 3.32 km^{2} (1.28 sq mi)
- Elevation: 250 m (820 ft)

Population (2025-12-31)
  - Total: 217
  - Density: 65.4/km^{2} (169/sq mi)
- Time zone: UTC+01:00 (CET)
  - Summer (DST): UTC+02:00 (CEST)
- Postal codes: 54636
- Dialling codes: 06568
- Vehicle registration: BIT
- Website: Ingendorf at the Bitburger Land website www.bitburgerland.de

Ingendorf is a municipality in the district of Bitburg-Prüm, in Rhineland-Palatinate, western Germany.
