= Meckel, Germany =

Meckel
- Municipality
- Coat of arms

- Location of Meckel within Eifelkreis Bitburg-Prüm district
- Interactive map of Meckel
- Location within Germany Location within Rhineland-Palatinate
- Coordinates: 49°53′24.34″N 06°30′57.17″E
- Country: Germany
- State: Rhineland-Palatinate
- District: Eifelkreis Bitburg-Prüm
- Municipal assoc.: Bitburger Land

Government
  - Mayor (2019–24): Johannes Junk

Area
  - Total: 10.8 km^{2} (4.2 sq mi)
- Elevation: 300 m (980 ft)

Population (2025-12-31)
  - Total: 425
  - Density: 39.4/km^{2} (102/sq mi)
- Time zone: UTC+01:00 (CET)
  - Summer (DST): UTC+02:00 (CEST)
- Postal codes: 54636
- Dialling codes: 06568
- Vehicle registration: BIT
- Website: Meckel at the Bitburger Land website www.bitburgerland.de

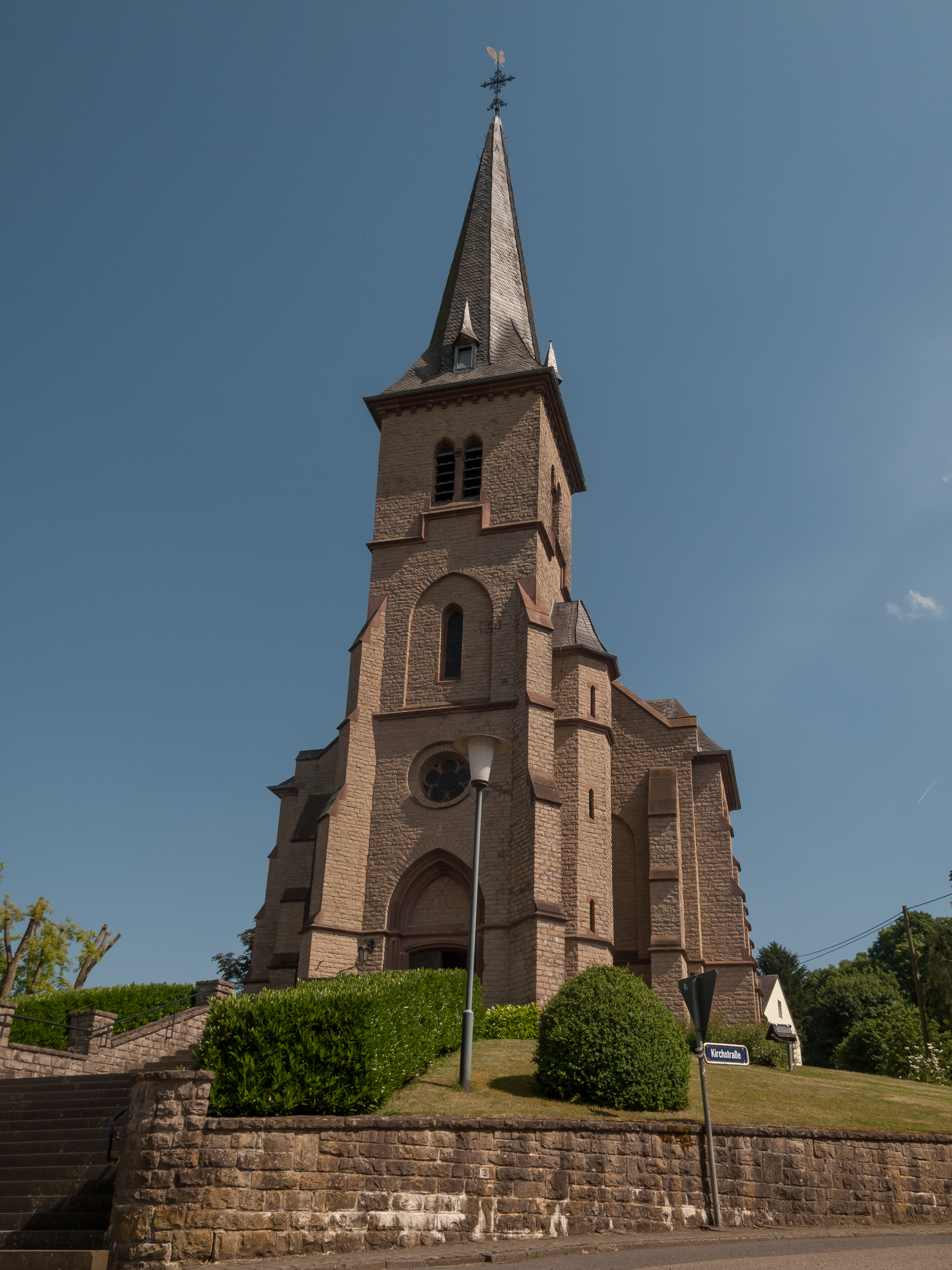
Meckel, the Catholic parish church Sankt Bartholomäus

Meckel (German pronunciation: [ˈmɛkl̩]) is a municipality in the district of Bitburg-Prüm, in Rhineland-Palatinate, western Germany.
