= Fließem =

- Municipality
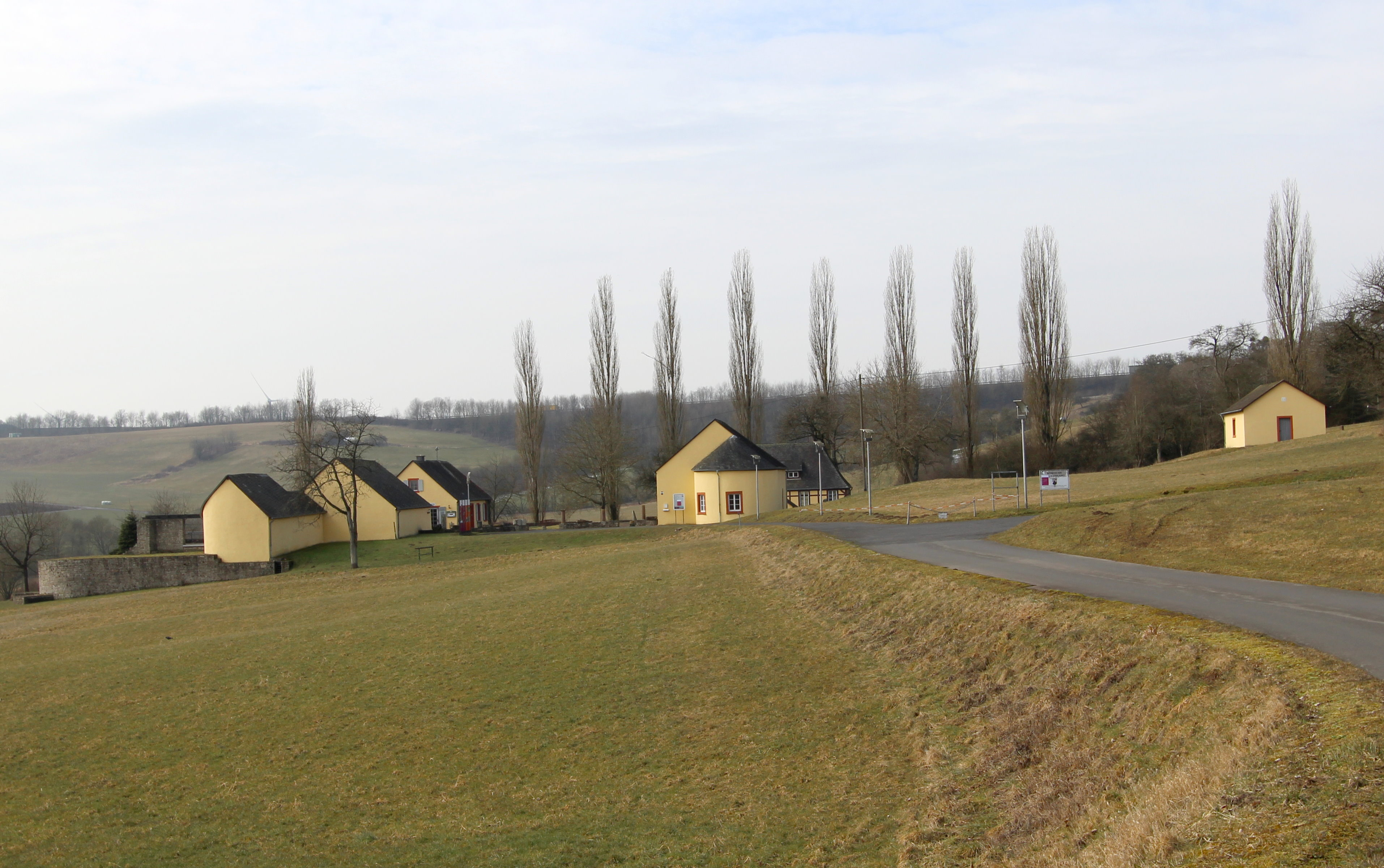
- Roman Villa Otrang

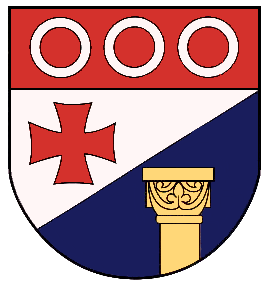
- Coat of arms

- Location of Fließem within Eifelkreis Bitburg-Prüm district
- Interactive map of Fließem
- Location within Germany Location within Rhineland-Palatinate
- Coordinates: 50°01′22″N 6°32′34″E
- Country: Germany
- State: Rhineland-Palatinate
- District: Eifelkreis Bitburg-Prüm
- Municipal assoc.: Bitburger Land

Government
  - Mayor (2019–24): Anja Esch

Area
  - Total: 8.38 km^{2} (3.24 sq mi)
- Elevation: 341 m (1,119 ft)

Population (2025-12-31)
  - Total: 670
  - Density: 80/km^{2} (210/sq mi)
- Time zone: UTC+01:00 (CET)
  - Summer (DST): UTC+02:00 (CEST)
- Postal codes: 54636
- Dialling codes: 06569
- Vehicle registration: BIT
- Website: www.fliessem.de

Fließem is a municipality in the district of Bitburg-Prüm, in Rhineland-Palatinate, western Germany.
