= Balesfeld =

- Municipality
- Coat of arms

- Location of Balesfeld within Eifelkreis Bitburg-Prüm district
- Interactive map of Balesfeld
- Location within Germany Location within Rhineland-Palatinate
- Coordinates: 50°6′19″N 6°31′53″E
- Country: Germany
- State: Rhineland-Palatinate
- District: Eifelkreis Bitburg-Prüm
- Municipal assoc.: Bitburger Land

Government
  - Mayor (2019–24): Ernst Nober

Area
  - Total: 2.35 km^{2} (0.91 sq mi)
- Elevation: 485 m (1,591 ft)

Population (2025-12-31)
  - Total: 187
  - Density: 79.6/km^{2} (206/sq mi)
- Time zone: UTC+01:00 (CET)
  - Summer (DST): UTC+02:00 (CEST)
- Postal codes: 54597
- Dialling codes: 06553
- Vehicle registration: BIT
- Website: www.bitburgerland.de

Balesfeld (in the Waldeifel region) is a municipality in the district of Bitburg-Prüm, in Rhineland-Palatinate, western Germany.
