= Idesheim =

- Municipality
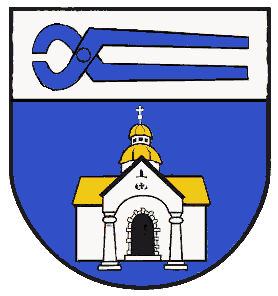
- Coat of arms

- Location of Idesheim within Eifelkreis Bitburg-Prüm district
- Interactive map of Idesheim
- Location within Germany Location within Rhineland-Palatinate
- Coordinates: 49°52′29″N 6°34′24″E
- Country: Germany
- State: Rhineland-Palatinate
- District: Eifelkreis Bitburg-Prüm
- Municipal assoc.: Bitburger Land

Government
  - Mayor (2019–24): Werner Kreinz

Area
  - Total: 6.72 km^{2} (2.59 sq mi)
- Elevation: 310 m (1,020 ft)

Population (2025-12-31)
  - Total: 408
  - Density: 60.7/km^{2} (157/sq mi)
- Time zone: UTC+01:00 (CET)
  - Summer (DST): UTC+02:00 (CEST)
- Postal codes: 54636
- Dialling codes: 06506
- Vehicle registration: BIT
- Website: Idesheim at the Bitburger Land website www.bitburgerland.de

Idesheim is a municipality in the district of Bitburg-Prüm, in Rhineland-Palatinate, western Germany.

== Localities ==
- Ittel
