= Sankt Thomas, Germany =

Sankt Thomas
- Municipality
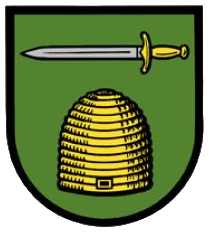
- Coat of arms

- Location of Sankt Thomas within Eifelkreis Bitburg-Prüm district
- Interactive map of Sankt Thomas
- Location within Germany Location within Rhineland-Palatinate
- Coordinates: 50°04′08″N 6°36′08″E
- Country: Germany
- State: Rhineland-Palatinate
- District: Eifelkreis Bitburg-Prüm
- Municipal assoc.: Bitburger Land

Government
  - Mayor (2019–24): Rudolf Höser

Area
  - Total: 9.11 km^{2} (3.52 sq mi)
- Elevation: 288 m (945 ft)

Population (2025-12-31)
  - Total: 228
  - Density: 25.0/km^{2} (64.8/sq mi)
- Time zone: UTC+01:00 (CET)
  - Summer (DST): UTC+02:00 (CEST)
- Postal codes: 54655
- Dialling codes: 06563
- Vehicle registration: BIT
- Website: Sankt Thomas at the Bitburger Land website www.bitburgerland.de

Sankt Thomas (German pronunciation: [zaŋkt ˈtoːmas]) is a village in the district Bitburg-Prüm, in Rhineland-Palatinate, Germany. It is situated in the Eifel. The name refers to the Archbishop of Canterbury Thomas Becket.
