= Burbach, Rhineland-Palatinate =

Burbach
- Municipality
- Coat of arms

- Location of Burbach within Eifelkreis Bitburg-Prüm district
- Interactive map of Burbach
- Location within Germany Location within Rhineland-Palatinate
- Coordinates: 50°06′24″N 06°31′4″E
- Country: Germany
- State: Rhineland-Palatinate
- District: Eifelkreis Bitburg-Prüm
- Municipal assoc.: Bitburger Land

Government
  - Mayor (2019–24): Johann Spoden

Area
  - Total: 17.04 km^{2} (6.58 sq mi)
- Elevation: 447 m (1,467 ft)

Population (2025-12-31)
  - Total: 711
  - Density: 41.7/km^{2} (108/sq mi)
- Time zone: UTC+01:00 (CET)
  - Summer (DST): UTC+02:00 (CEST)
- Postal codes: 54597
- Dialling codes: 06553
- Vehicle registration: BIT
- Website: www.burbach-eifel.de

Burbach (German pronunciation: [ˈbuːɐ̯bax]) on the northern edge of the Waldeifel region is a municipality in the district of Bitburg-Prüm, in Rhineland-Palatinate, western Germany.

Also within the municipality of Burbach are Neustraßburg and the settlements and hamlets of Burbachermühle (also known as Evensmühle), Dahlheckhof, Hof Lietzkreuz, In der Katzenbach, and Neuenweiher.
