= Hüttingen an der Kyll =

- Municipality
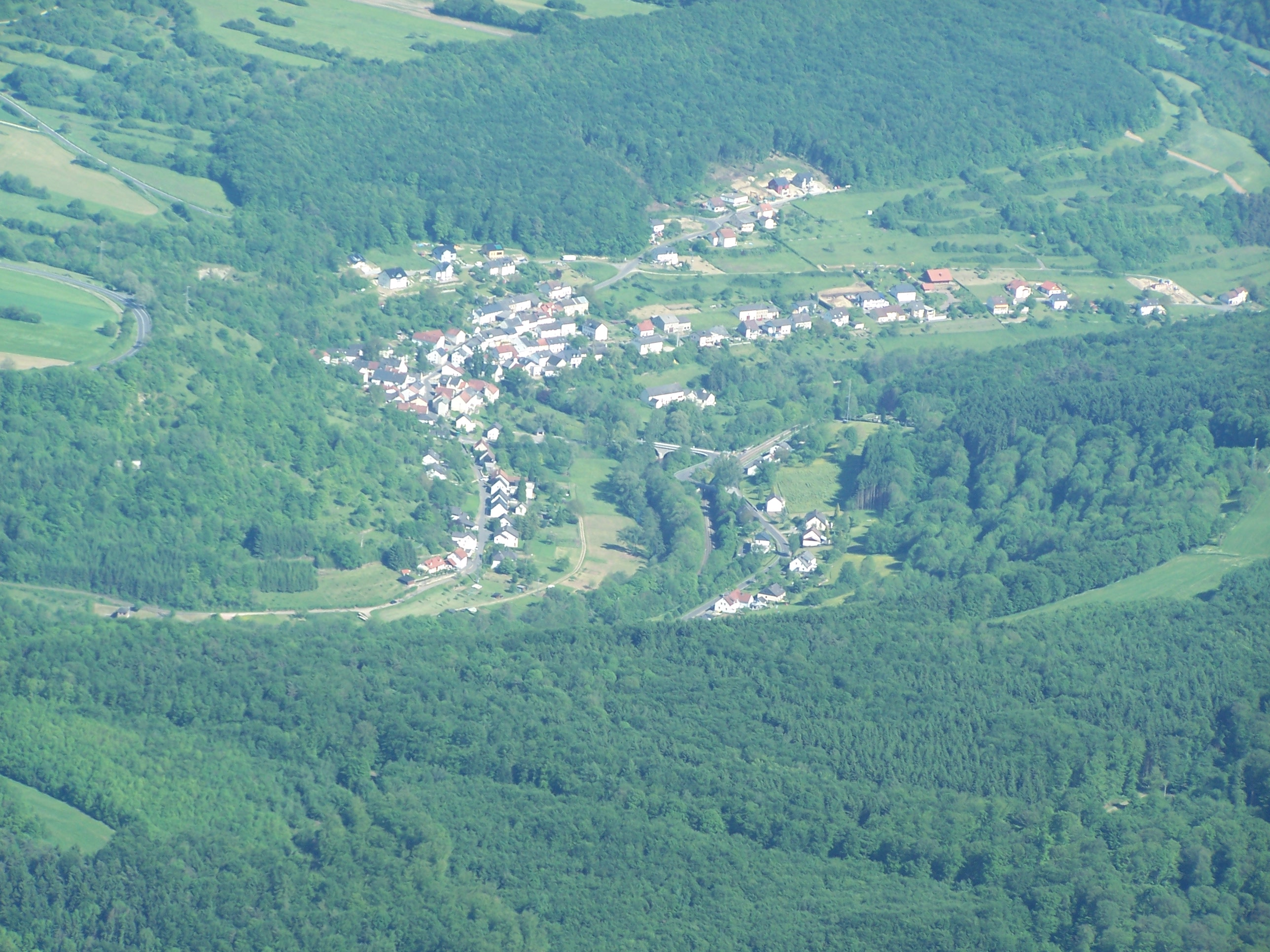

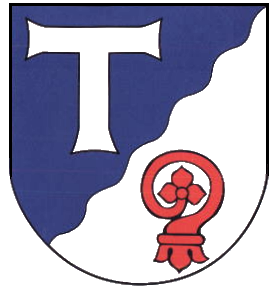
- Coat of arms

- Location of Hüttingen an der Kyll within Eifelkreis Bitburg-Prüm district
- Interactive map of Hüttingen an der Kyll
- Location within Germany Location within Rhineland-Palatinate
- Coordinates: 49°58′5″N 06°35′16″E
- Country: Germany
- State: Rhineland-Palatinate
- District: Eifelkreis Bitburg-Prüm
- Municipal assoc.: Bitburger Land

Government
  - Mayor (2019–24): Frank Colling

Area
  - Total: 2.94 km^{2} (1.14 sq mi)
- Elevation: 214 m (702 ft)

Population (2025-12-31)
  - Total: 317
  - Density: 108/km^{2} (279/sq mi)
- Time zone: UTC+01:00 (CET)
  - Summer (DST): UTC+02:00 (CEST)
- Postal codes: 54636
- Dialling codes: 06565
- Vehicle registration: BIT
- Website: Hüttingen an der Kyll at the Bitburger Land website www.bitburgerland.de

Hüttingen an der Kyll (English: Hüttingen on the Kyll) is a municipality in the district of Bitburg-Prüm, in Rhineland-Palatinate, western Germany.
