= Idenheim =

- Municipality
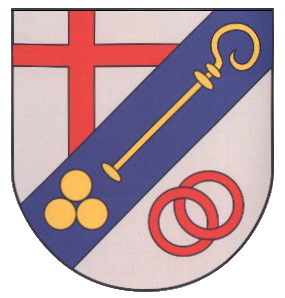
- Coat of arms

- Location of Idenheim within Eifelkreis Bitburg-Prüm district
- Interactive map of Idenheim
- Location within Germany Location within Rhineland-Palatinate
- Coordinates: 49°53′55″N 6°34′13″E
- Country: Germany
- State: Rhineland-Palatinate
- District: Eifelkreis Bitburg-Prüm
- Municipal assoc.: Bitburger Land

Government
  - Mayor (2019–24): Ingrid Penning

Area
  - Total: 7.73 km^{2} (2.98 sq mi)
- Elevation: 320 m (1,050 ft)

Population (2025-12-31)
  - Total: 424
  - Density: 54.9/km^{2} (142/sq mi)
- Time zone: UTC+01:00 (CET)
  - Summer (DST): UTC+02:00 (CEST)
- Postal codes: 54636
- Dialling codes: 06506, 06561
- Vehicle registration: BIT
- Website: Idenheim at the Bitburger Land website www.bitburgerland.de

Idenheim is a municipality in the district of Bitburg-Prüm, in Rhineland-Palatinate, western Germany.
