= Halsdorf =

- Municipality
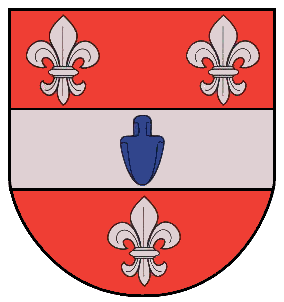
- Coat of arms

- Location of Halsdorf within Eifelkreis Bitburg-Prüm district
- Interactive map of Halsdorf
- Location within Germany Location within Rhineland-Palatinate
- Coordinates: 49°55′46″N 6°22′29″E
- Country: Germany
- State: Rhineland-Palatinate
- District: Eifelkreis Bitburg-Prüm
- Municipal assoc.: Bitburger Land

Government
  - Mayor (2019–24): Berthold Heck

Area
  - Total: 3.21 km^{2} (1.24 sq mi)
- Elevation: 300 m (980 ft)

Population (2025-12-31)
  - Total: 99
  - Density: 31/km^{2} (80/sq mi)
- Time zone: UTC+01:00 (CET)
  - Summer (DST): UTC+02:00 (CEST)
- Postal codes: 54646
- Dialling codes: 06522, 06527
- Vehicle registration: BIT
- Website: Halsdorf at the Bitburger Land website www.bitburgerland.de

Halsdorf is a municipality in the district of Bitburg-Prüm, in Rhineland-Palatinate, western Germany.
