= Niederstedem =

- Municipality
- Coat of arms

- Location of Niederstedem within Eifelkreis Bitburg-Prüm district
- Interactive map of Niederstedem
- Location within Germany Location within Rhineland-Palatinate
- Coordinates: 49°55′54″N 6°29′55″E
- Country: Germany
- State: Rhineland-Palatinate
- District: Eifelkreis Bitburg-Prüm
- Municipal assoc.: Bitburger Land

Government
  - Mayor (2019–24): Johann Hatz

Area
  - Total: 5.46 km^{2} (2.11 sq mi)
- Elevation: 259 m (850 ft)

Population (2025-12-31)
  - Total: 218
  - Density: 39.9/km^{2} (103/sq mi)
- Time zone: UTC+01:00 (CET)
  - Summer (DST): UTC+02:00 (CEST)
- Postal codes: 54634
- Dialling codes: 06568
- Vehicle registration: BIT
- Website: Niederstedem at the Bitburger Land website www.bitburgerland.de

Niederstedem is a municipality in the district of Bitburg-Prüm, in Rhineland-Palatinate, western Germany.
