= Neuheilenbach =

- Municipality
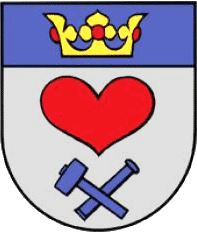
- Coat of arms

- Location of Neuheilenbach within Eifelkreis Bitburg-Prüm district
- Interactive map of Neuheilenbach
- Location within Germany Location within Rhineland-Palatinate
- Coordinates: 50°06′50″N 06°33′39″E
- Country: Germany
- State: Rhineland-Palatinate
- District: Eifelkreis Bitburg-Prüm
- Municipal assoc.: Bitburger Land

Government
  - Mayor (2019–24): Theo Marx

Area
  - Total: 0.97 km^{2} (0.37 sq mi)
- Elevation: 500–556 m (1,640–1,824 ft)

Population (2025-12-31)
  - Total: 244
  - Density: 250/km^{2} (650/sq mi)
- Time zone: UTC+01:00 (CET)
  - Summer (DST): UTC+02:00 (CEST)
- Postal codes: 54597
- Dialling codes: 06563
- Vehicle registration: BIT
- Website: www.neuheilenbach.de

Neuheilenbach is a municipality in the district of Bitburg-Prüm, in Rhineland-Palatinate, western Germany.
