= Wiersdorf =

- Municipality
- Coat of arms

- Location of Wiersdorf within Eifelkreis Bitburg-Prüm district
- Interactive map of Wiersdorf
- Location within Germany Location within Rhineland-Palatinate
- Coordinates: 50°00′27″N 06°27′07″E
- Country: Germany
- State: Rhineland-Palatinate
- District: Eifelkreis Bitburg-Prüm
- Municipal assoc.: Bitburger Land

Government
  - Mayor (2019–24): Stefan Theis

Area
  - Total: 4.06 km^{2} (1.57 sq mi)
- Elevation: 290 m (950 ft)

Population (2025-12-31)
  - Total: 263
  - Density: 64.8/km^{2} (168/sq mi)
- Time zone: UTC+01:00 (CET)
  - Summer (DST): UTC+02:00 (CEST)
- Postal codes: 54636
- Dialling codes: 06569
- Vehicle registration: BIT
- Website: Wiersdorf at the Bitburger Land website www.bitburg-land.de

Wiersdorf is a municipality in the district of Bitburg-Prüm, in Rhineland-Palatinate, western Germany.
