= Wettlingen =

- Municipality
- Coat of arms

- Location of Wettlingen within Eifelkreis Bitburg-Prüm district
- Interactive map of Wettlingen
- Location within Germany Location within Rhineland-Palatinate
- Coordinates: 49°55′47″N 06°24′22″E
- Country: Germany
- State: Rhineland-Palatinate
- District: Eifelkreis Bitburg-Prüm
- Municipal assoc.: Bitburger Land

Government
  - Mayor (2019–24): Karlheinz Wonner

Area
  - Total: 3.46 km^{2} (1.34 sq mi)
- Elevation: 220 m (720 ft)

Population (2025-12-31)
  - Total: 31
  - Density: 9.0/km^{2} (23/sq mi)
- Time zone: UTC+01:00 (CET)
  - Summer (DST): UTC+02:00 (CEST)
- Postal codes: 54646
- Dialling codes: 06527
- Vehicle registration: BIT
- Website: Wettlingen at the Bitburger Land website www.bitburgerland.de

Wettlingen (German pronunciation: [ˈvɛtlɪŋən]) is a municipality in the district of Bitburg-Prüm, in Rhineland-Palatinate, western Germany.
