= Sülm =

- Municipality
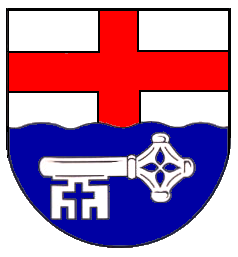
- Coat of arms

- Location of Sülm within Eifelkreis Bitburg-Prüm district
- Interactive map of Sülm
- Location within Germany Location within Rhineland-Palatinate
- Coordinates: 49°55′17″N 06°34′27″E
- Country: Germany
- State: Rhineland-Palatinate
- District: Eifelkreis Bitburg-Prüm
- Municipal assoc.: Bitburger Land

Government
  - Mayor (2019–24): Klara Weber

Area
  - Total: 7.05 km^{2} (2.72 sq mi)
- Elevation: 340 m (1,120 ft)

Population (2025-12-31)
  - Total: 391
  - Density: 55.5/km^{2} (144/sq mi)
- Time zone: UTC+01:00 (CET)
  - Summer (DST): UTC+02:00 (CEST)
- Postal codes: 54636
- Dialling codes: 06562
- Vehicle registration: BIT
- Website: Sülm at the Bitburger Land website www.bitburgerland.de

Sülm (German pronunciation: [zʏlm]) is a municipality in the district of Bitburg-Prüm, in Rhineland-Palatinate, western Germany.

== Geography ==
Sülm lies in the Southwest Eifel, about 5 km southeast of the county town Bitburg. The area extends to the so-called "Bitburger plateau and covers an area of 705 ha, of which 65% are used for agriculture, with 24% is a relatively small proportion of forest existed.

== History ==
Sülm and 634 are the places Welschbillig, Newel and Röhl with their churches and related of King Dagobert I (reign: 622-638, Trier-residence: 624 to 625) of the Church of St. Pauli pin Trier offered. At that time, Modoald bishop of Trier. 981 this gift in a deed of the Archbishop mentioned Egbert of Trier (bishop 977-993). Sülm is in that document was first mentioned as "Sulmana".

== Attractions ==
There are numerous renovated farm houses scattered about the municipality. The old war memorial chapel with a sandstone altar dates from 1631. There are also interesting grave markers from the 16th and 17th centuries in the Sülm Cemetery smau . In contrast to most of the burial sites in the Eifel district, several Sülm grave stones from the late 19th century have been preserved in the cemetery.

== Economy and infrastructure ==
Sülm is today an agricultural and tourist town. The village is home to several full- and part-time farms and three distilleries. In the services sector, it has a village inn, two private guest houses, a kindergarten and a public library.

About 2 km west of the village runs the Bundesstraße 51, which leads to Bitburg and about 10 km from the Bundesautobahn 60.

== Sons and daughters of the place ==
- Bernhard Lemling (1904–1961), one of the most notable poets of the Eifel
