= Ehlenz =

- Municipality
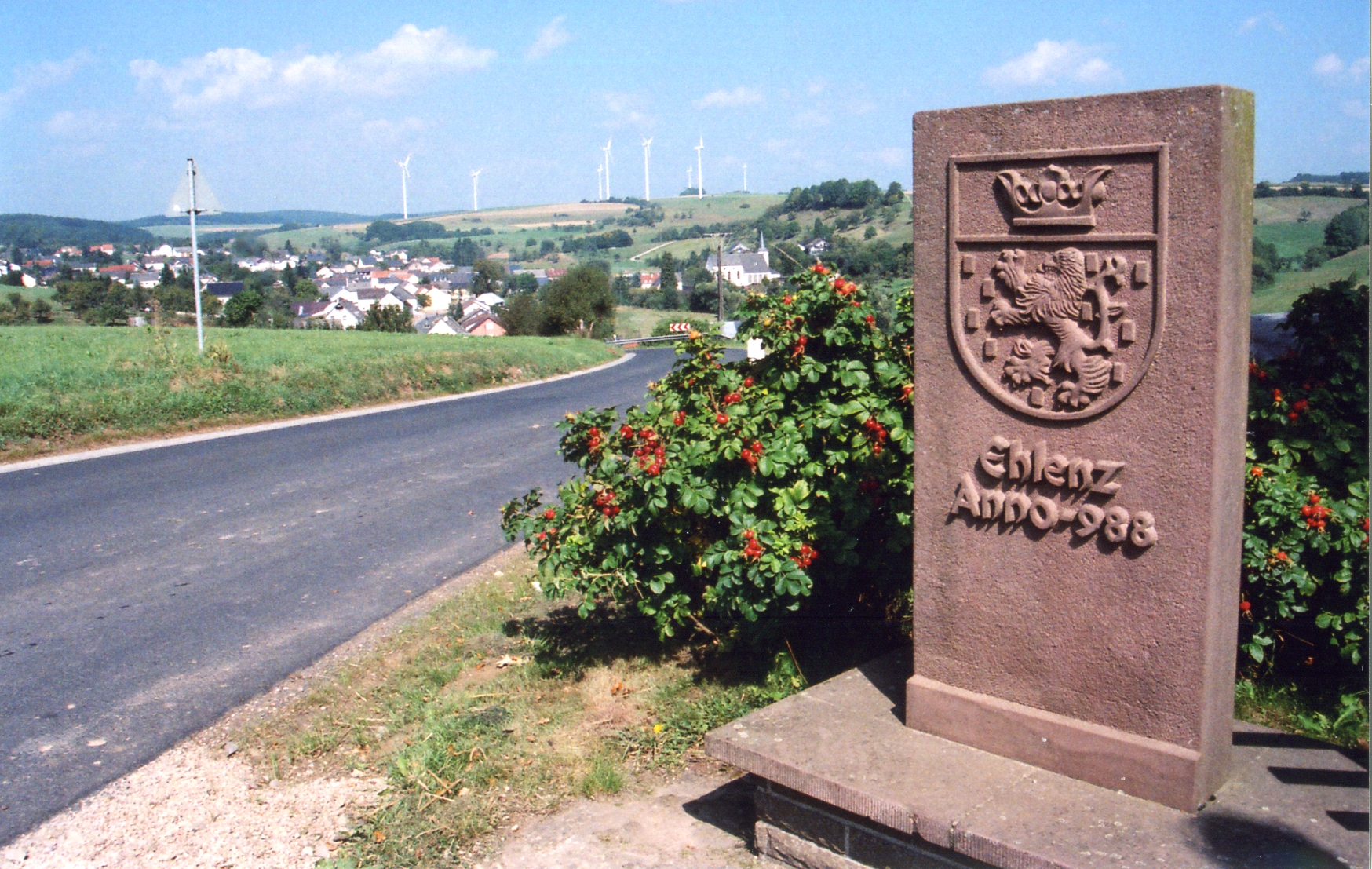

- Location of Ehlenz within Eifelkreis Bitburg-Prüm district
- Interactive map of Ehlenz
- Location within Germany Location within Rhineland-Palatinate
- Coordinates: 50°02′29″N 06°28′16″E
- Country: Germany
- State: Rhineland-Palatinate
- District: Eifelkreis Bitburg-Prüm
- Municipal assoc.: Bitburger Land

Government
  - Mayor (2019–24): Erik Lichter

Area
  - Total: 5.95 km^{2} (2.30 sq mi)
- Elevation: 320 m (1,050 ft)

Population (2025-12-31)
  - Total: 430
  - Density: 72/km^{2} (190/sq mi)
- Time zone: UTC+01:00 (CET)
  - Summer (DST): UTC+02:00 (CEST)
- Postal codes: 54636
- Dialling codes: 06569
- Vehicle registration: BIT
- Website: www.ehlenz-live.de

Ehlenz is a municipality in the district of Bitburg-Prüm, in Rhineland-Palatinate, western Germany.
