= Zendscheid =

- Municipality
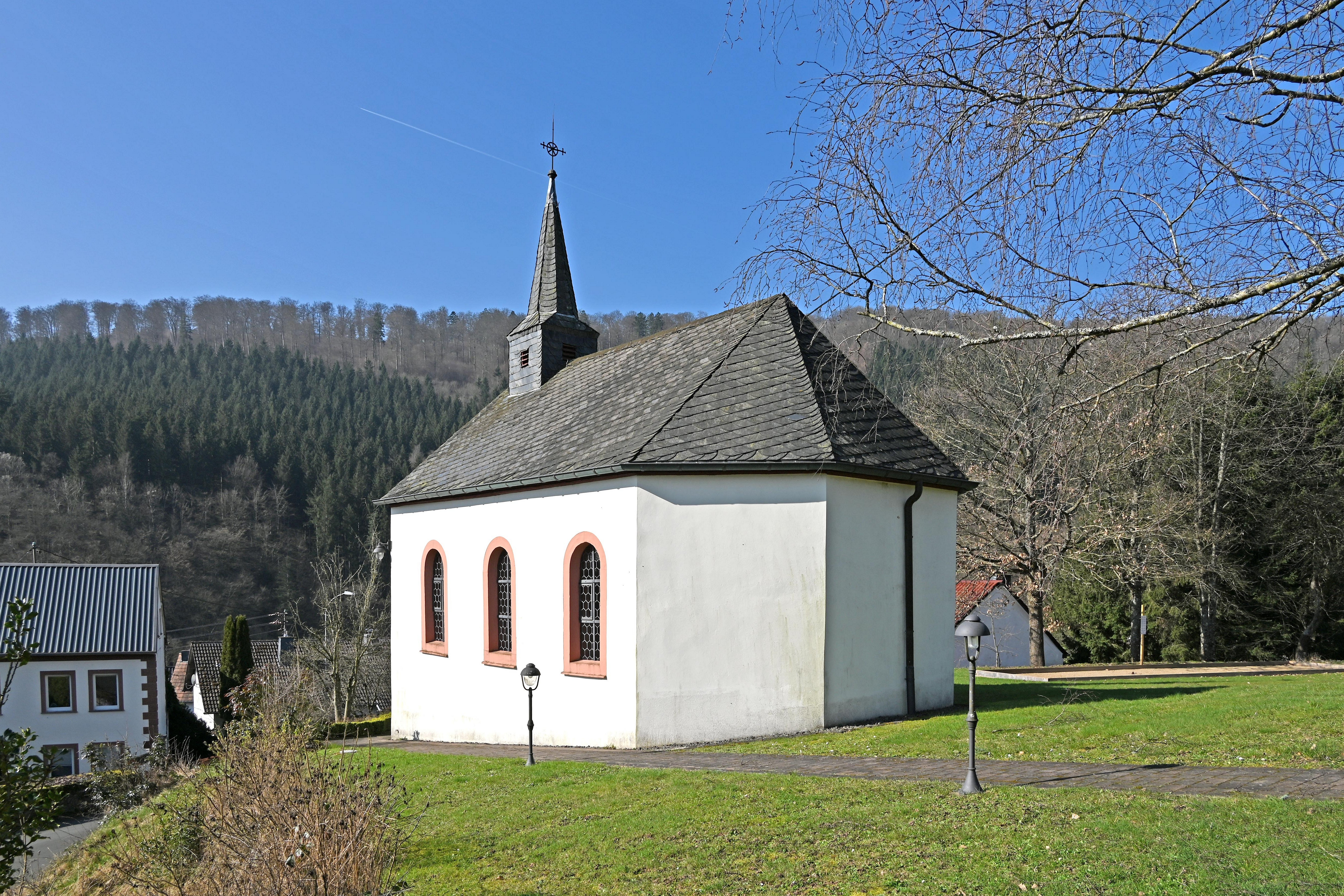

- Coat of arms

- Location of Zendscheid within Eifelkreis Bitburg-Prüm district
- Interactive map of Zendscheid
- Location within Germany Location within Rhineland-Palatinate
- Coordinates: 50°05′58.32″N 06°36′15.56″E
- Country: Germany
- State: Rhineland-Palatinate
- District: Eifelkreis Bitburg-Prüm
- Municipal assoc.: Bitburger Land

Government
  - Mayor (2019–24): Jörg Niederprüm

Area
  - Total: 2.35 km^{2} (0.91 sq mi)
- Elevation: 314 m (1,030 ft)

Population (2025-12-31)
  - Total: 124
  - Density: 52.8/km^{2} (137/sq mi)
- Time zone: UTC+01:00 (CET)
  - Summer (DST): UTC+02:00 (CEST)
- Postal codes: 54655
- Dialling codes: 06563
- Vehicle registration: BIT / PRU
- Website: Gemeinde Zendscheid (at Facebook)

Zendscheid (German pronunciation: [ˈtsɛntˌʃaɪt]) is a municipality in the district of Bitburg-Prüm, in Rhineland-Palatinate, western Germany.
