= Stockem, Germany =

Stockem
- Municipality
- Coat of arms

- Location of Stockem within Eifelkreis Bitburg-Prüm district
- Interactive map of Stockem
- Location within Germany Location within Rhineland-Palatinate
- Coordinates: 49°55′46″N 06°23′04″E
- Country: Germany
- State: Rhineland-Palatinate
- District: Eifelkreis Bitburg-Prüm
- Municipal assoc.: Bitburger Land

Government
  - Mayor (2019–24): Markus Gaspers

Area
  - Total: 3.97 km^{2} (1.53 sq mi)
- Elevation: 310 m (1,020 ft)

Population (2025-12-31)
  - Total: 94
  - Density: 24/km^{2} (61/sq mi)
- Time zone: UTC+01:00 (CET)
  - Summer (DST): UTC+02:00 (CEST)
- Postal codes: 54646
- Dialling codes: 06527
- Vehicle registration: BIT
- Website: Stockem at the Bitburger Land website www.bitburgerland.de

Stockem is a municipality in the district of Bitburg-Prüm, in Rhineland-Palatinate, western Germany.
