= Dahlem, Rhineland-Palatinate =

Dahlem
- Municipality
- Coat of arms

- Location of Dahlem within Eifelkreis Bitburg-Prüm district
- Interactive map of Dahlem
- Location within Germany Location within Rhineland-Palatinate
- Coordinates: 49°54′53″N 06°35′35″E
- Country: Germany
- State: Rhineland-Palatinate
- District: Eifelkreis Bitburg-Prüm
- Municipal assoc.: Bitburger Land

Government
  - Mayor (2025–29): Patrick Zenzen

Area
  - Total: 4.28 km^{2} (1.65 sq mi)
- Elevation: 260 m (850 ft)

Population (2025-12-31)
  - Total: 251
  - Density: 58.6/km^{2} (152/sq mi)
- Time zone: UTC+01:00 (CET)
  - Summer (DST): UTC+02:00 (CEST)
- Postal codes: 54636
- Dialling codes: 06562
- Vehicle registration: BIT
- Website: www.dahlem.de

Dahlem (German pronunciation: [ˈdaːləm]) is a municipality in the district of Bitburg-Prüm, in Rhineland-Palatinate, western Germany.
