= Heilenbach =

- Municipality
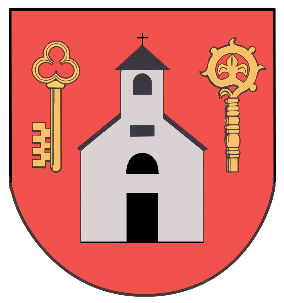
- Coat of arms

- Location of Heilenbach within Eifelkreis Bitburg-Prüm district
- Interactive map of Heilenbach
- Location within Germany Location within Rhineland-Palatinate
- Coordinates: 50°03′53″N 6°27′56″E
- Country: Germany
- State: Rhineland-Palatinate
- District: Eifelkreis Bitburg-Prüm
- Municipal assoc.: Bitburger Land

Government
  - Mayor (2019–24): Egon Moos

Area
  - Total: 7.86 km^{2} (3.03 sq mi)
- Elevation: 390 m (1,280 ft)

Population (2025-12-31)
  - Total: 97
  - Density: 12/km^{2} (32/sq mi)
- Time zone: UTC+01:00 (CET)
  - Summer (DST): UTC+02:00 (CEST)
- Postal codes: 54636
- Dialling codes: 06569
- Vehicle registration: BIT
- Website: Heilenbach at the Bitburger Land website www.bitburgerland.de

Heilenbach is a municipality in the district of Bitburg-Prüm, in Rhineland-Palatinate, western Germany.
