= Hamm, Bitburg-Prüm =

Hamm
- Municipality
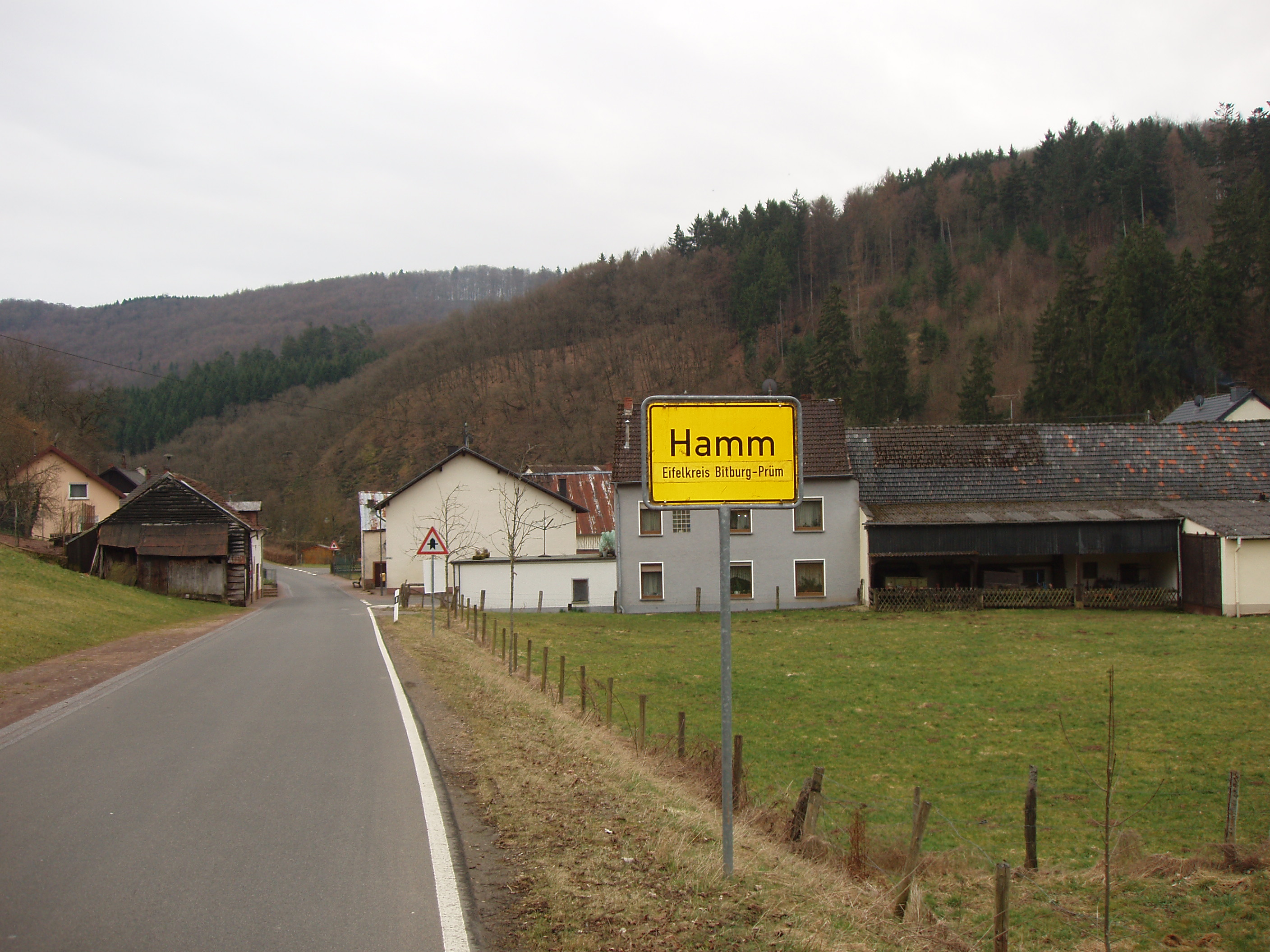

- Coat of arms

- Location of Hamm within Eifelkreis Bitburg-Prüm district
- Interactive map of Hamm
- Location within Germany Location within Rhineland-Palatinate
- Coordinates: 50°01′00″N 06°25′06″E
- Country: Germany
- State: Rhineland-Palatinate
- District: Eifelkreis Bitburg-Prüm
- Municipal assoc.: Bitburger Land

Government
  - Mayor (2019–24): Ferdinand Graf von und zu Westerholt und Gysenberg

Area
  - Total: 1.73 km^{2} (0.67 sq mi)
- Elevation: 113 m (371 ft)

Population (2025-12-31)
  - Total: 16
  - Density: 9.2/km^{2} (24/sq mi)
- Time zone: UTC+01:00 (CET)
  - Summer (DST): UTC+02:00 (CEST)
- Postal codes: 54636
- Dialling codes: 06569
- Vehicle registration: BIT
- Website: Hamm at the Bitburger Land website www.bitburgerland.de

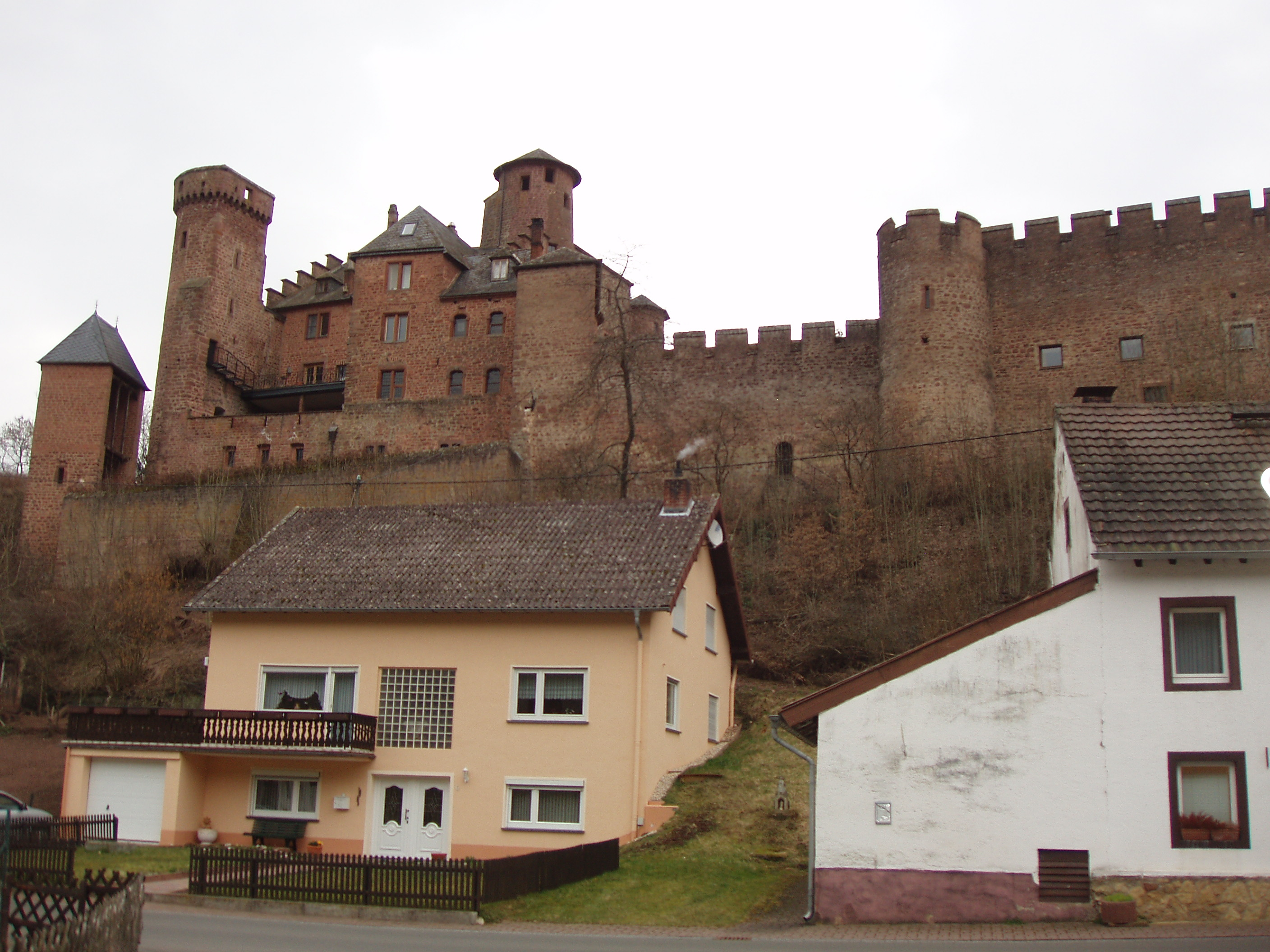
Hamm Castle as seen from the main street

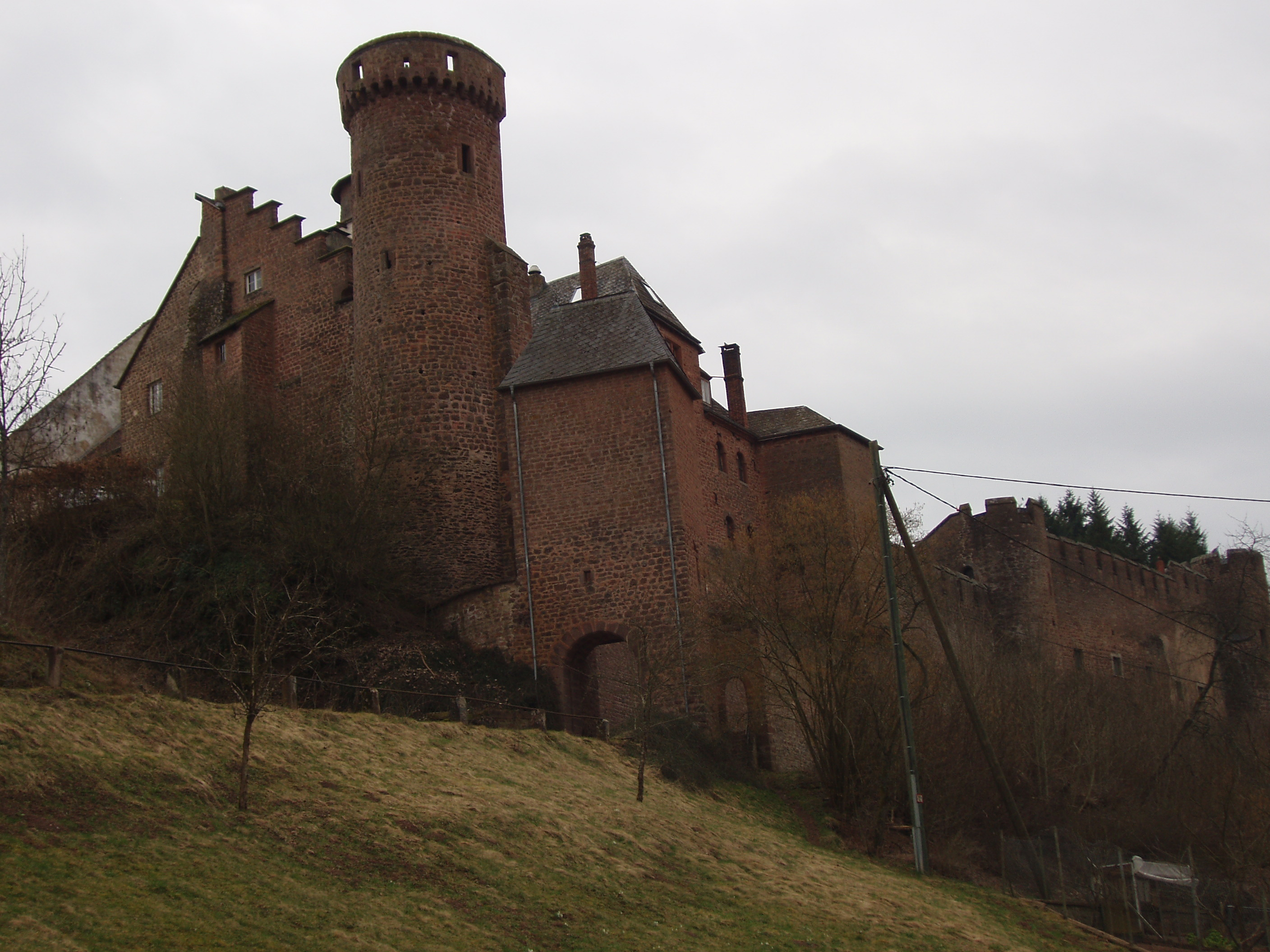
Hamm Castle as seen from the north

Hamm (German pronunciation: [ham]) is a municipality in the district of Bitburg-Prüm, in Rhineland-Palatinate, western Germany.

Hamm consists of only a few houses along the Hauptstrasse (main street). It is overlooked by Hamm Castle which dates back to the 11th century and is one of the largest medieval castles in the Eifel region.
