= Wolsfeld =

- Municipality
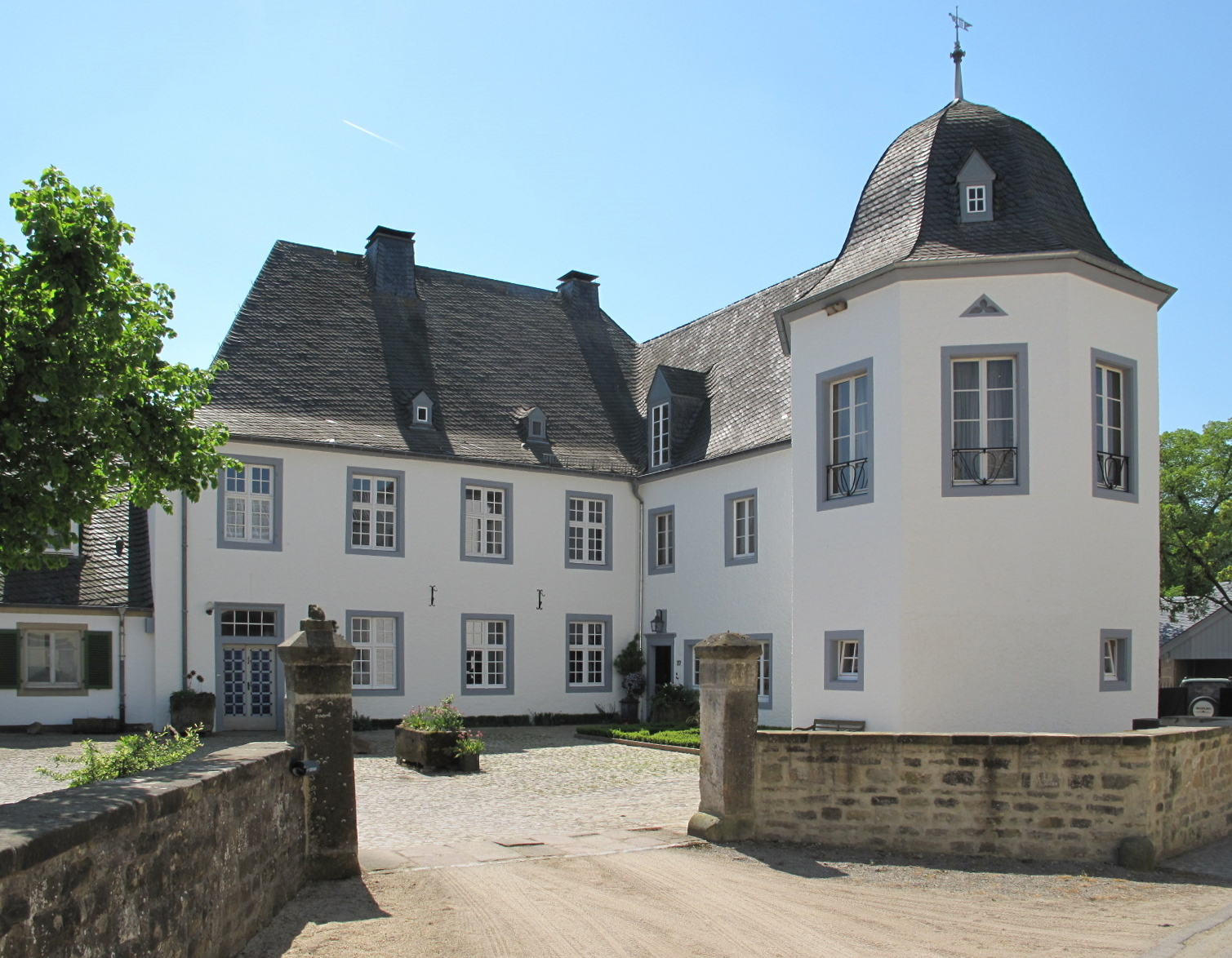

- Coat of arms

- Location of Wolsfeld within Eifelkreis Bitburg-Prüm district
- Interactive map of Wolsfeld
- Location within Germany Location within Rhineland-Palatinate
- Coordinates: 49°54′22″N 6°28′02″E
- Country: Germany
- State: Rhineland-Palatinate
- District: Eifelkreis Bitburg-Prüm
- Municipal assoc.: Bitburger Land

Government
  - Mayor (2019–24): Ralf Schiemann

Area
  - Total: 9.27 km^{2} (3.58 sq mi)
- Elevation: 230 m (750 ft)

Population (2025-12-31)
  - Total: 1,104
  - Density: 119/km^{2} (308/sq mi)
- Time zone: UTC+01:00 (CET)
  - Summer (DST): UTC+02:00 (CEST)
- Postal codes: 54636
- Dialling codes: 06568
- Vehicle registration: BIT
- Website: Wolsfeld at the Bitburger Land website

Wolsfeld is a municipality in the district of Bitburg-Prüm, in Rhineland-Palatinate, western Germany. It is around 7 km south-west of Bitburg, and around 10 km from the Luxembourg border.
