= Röhl, Germany =

Röhl
- Municipality
- Coat of arms

- Location of Röhl within Eifelkreis Bitburg-Prüm district
- Interactive map of Röhl
- Location within Germany Location within Rhineland-Palatinate
- Coordinates: 49°56′14″N 06°34′58″E
- Country: Germany
- State: Rhineland-Palatinate
- District: Eifelkreis Bitburg-Prüm
- Municipal assoc.: Bitburger Land

Government
  - Mayor (2019–24): Bruno Wallenborn

Area
  - Total: 10.65 km^{2} (4.11 sq mi)
- Elevation: 340 m (1,120 ft)

Population (2025-12-31)
  - Total: 434
  - Density: 40.8/km^{2} (106/sq mi)
- Time zone: UTC+01:00 (CET)
  - Summer (DST): UTC+02:00 (CEST)
- Postal codes: 54636
- Dialling codes: 06562
- Vehicle registration: BIT
- Website: Röhl at the Bitburger Land website www.bitburgerland.de

Röhl is a municipality in the district of Bitburg-Prüm, in Rhineland-Palatinate, western Germany.
