= Niederweiler, Bitburg-Prüm =

Niederweiler
- Municipality
- Coat of arms

- Location of Niederweiler within Eifelkreis Bitburg-Prüm district
- Interactive map of Niederweiler
- Location within Germany Location within Rhineland-Palatinate
- Coordinates: 50°1′57″N 6°26′43″E
- Country: Germany
- State: Rhineland-Palatinate
- District: Eifelkreis Bitburg-Prüm
- Municipal assoc.: Bitburger Land

Government
  - Mayor (2019–24): Sarah Lempges

Area
  - Total: 4.58 km^{2} (1.77 sq mi)
- Elevation: 397 m (1,302 ft)

Population (2025-12-31)
  - Total: 100
  - Density: 22/km^{2} (57/sq mi)
- Time zone: UTC+01:00 (CET)
  - Summer (DST): UTC+02:00 (CEST)
- Postal codes: 54636
- Dialling codes: 06569
- Vehicle registration: BIT
- Website: Niederweiler at the Bitburger Land website www.bitburgerland.de

Niederweiler (German pronunciation: [ˈniːdɐvaɪlɐ]) is a municipality in the district of Bitburg-Prüm, in Rhineland-Palatinate, western Germany.
