= Steinborn =

Steinborn is a German surname, from stein ('stone') and born ('well', 'creek').

Notable people with this surname include:

- Jeff Steinborn (born 1970), American politician
- Margarete Steinborn (1893–1957), German film editor
- Otton Steinborn (1868–1936), Polish dermatologist and politician
- Ronja Steinborn (born 1990), German modern pentathlete
