= Metterich =

- Municipality
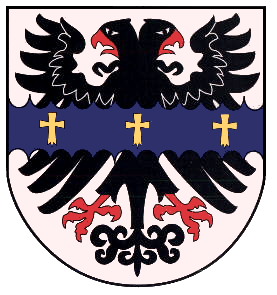
- Coat of arms

- Location of Metterich within Eifelkreis Bitburg-Prüm district
- Interactive map of Metterich
- Location within Germany Location within Rhineland-Palatinate
- Coordinates: 49°58′48″N 6°35′20″E
- Country: Germany
- State: Rhineland-Palatinate
- District: Eifelkreis Bitburg-Prüm
- Municipal assoc.: Bitburger Land

Government
  - Mayor (2019–24): Norbert Otten

Area
  - Total: 5.60 km^{2} (2.16 sq mi)
- Elevation: 310 m (1,020 ft)

Population (2025-12-31)
  - Total: 540
  - Density: 96/km^{2} (250/sq mi)
- Time zone: UTC+01:00 (CET)
  - Summer (DST): UTC+02:00 (CEST)
- Postal codes: 54634
- Dialling codes: 06565
- Vehicle registration: BIT
- Website: www.metterich.de

Metterich is a municipality in the district of Bitburg-Prüm, in Rhineland-Palatinate, western Germany.
