= Gransdorf =

- Municipality
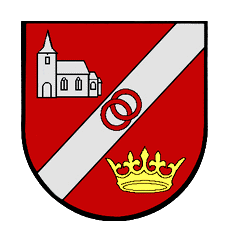
- Coat of arms

- Location of Gransdorf within Eifelkreis Bitburg-Prüm district
- Interactive map of Gransdorf
- Location within Germany Location within Rhineland-Palatinate
- Coordinates: 50°01′04″N 06°41′37″E
- Country: Germany
- State: Rhineland-Palatinate
- District: Eifelkreis Bitburg-Prüm
- Municipal assoc.: Bitburger Land

Government
  - Mayor (2019–24): Timo Willems

Area
  - Total: 7.08 km^{2} (2.73 sq mi)
- Elevation: 340 m (1,120 ft)

Population (2025-12-31)
  - Total: 360
  - Density: 51/km^{2} (130/sq mi)
- Time zone: UTC+01:00 (CET)
  - Summer (DST): UTC+02:00 (CEST)
- Postal codes: 54533
- Dialling codes: 06567
- Vehicle registration: BIT
- Website: www.gransdorf.de

Gransdorf is a municipality in western Germany, near Bitburg. It lies in the district of Bitburg-Prüm, in the state of Rhineland-Palatinate. It was first mentioned by name as Grandesdorf in 1098 in a letter to Henry IV, Holy Roman Emperor.
