= Pickließem =

- Municipality
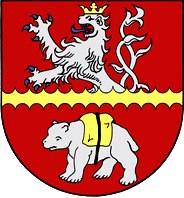
- Coat of arms

- Location of Pickließem within Eifelkreis Bitburg-Prüm district
- Interactive map of Pickließem
- Location within Germany Location within Rhineland-Palatinate
- Coordinates: 49°59′25″N 6°39′00″E
- Country: Germany
- State: Rhineland-Palatinate
- District: Eifelkreis Bitburg-Prüm
- Municipal assoc.: Bitburger Land

Government
  - Mayor (2019–24): Edgar Comes

Area
  - Total: 5.76 km^{2} (2.22 sq mi)
- Elevation: 330 m (1,080 ft)

Population (2025-12-31)
  - Total: 296
  - Density: 51.4/km^{2} (133/sq mi)
- Time zone: UTC+01:00 (CET)
  - Summer (DST): UTC+02:00 (CEST)
- Postal codes: 54647
- Dialling codes: 06565
- Vehicle registration: BIT
- Website: Pickließem at the Bitburger Land website www.bitburgerland.de

Pickließem is a municipality in the district of Bitburg-Prüm, in Rhineland-Palatinate, western Germany.
