= Orsfeld =

- Municipality
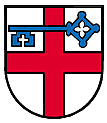
- Coat of arms

- Location of Orsfeld within Eifelkreis Bitburg-Prüm district
- Interactive map of Orsfeld
- Location within Germany Location within Rhineland-Palatinate
- Coordinates: 50°01′45″N 6°37′26″E
- Country: Germany
- State: Rhineland-Palatinate
- District: Eifelkreis Bitburg-Prüm
- Municipal assoc.: Bitburger Land

Government
  - Mayor (2019–24): Peter Schwickerath

Area
  - Total: 5.17 km^{2} (2.00 sq mi)
- Elevation: 400 m (1,300 ft)

Population (2025-12-31)
  - Total: 194
  - Density: 37.5/km^{2} (97.2/sq mi)
- Time zone: UTC+01:00 (CET)
  - Summer (DST): UTC+02:00 (CEST)
- Postal codes: 54655
- Dialling codes: 06563
- Vehicle registration: BIT
- Website: Orsfeld at the Bitburger Land website www.bitburgerland.de

Orsfeld in the Waldeifel region is a municipality in the district of Bitburg-Prüm, in Rhineland-Palatinate, western Germany.
