= Bettingen, Rhineland-Palatinate =

Bettingen
- Municipality
- Coat of arms

- Location of Bettingen within Eifelkreis Bitburg-Prüm district
- Interactive map of Bettingen
- Location within Germany Location within Rhineland-Palatinate
- Coordinates: 49°56′35″N 06°24′3″E
- Country: Germany
- State: Rhineland-Palatinate
- District: Eifelkreis Bitburg-Prüm
- Municipal assoc.: Bitburger Land

Government
  - Mayor (2019–24): Hans-Jürgen Holbach (SPD)

Area
  - Total: 7.25 km^{2} (2.80 sq mi)
- Elevation: 270 m (890 ft)

Population (2025-12-31)
  - Total: 1,058
  - Density: 146/km^{2} (378/sq mi)
- Time zone: UTC+01:00 (CET)
  - Summer (DST): UTC+02:00 (CEST)
- Postal codes: 54646
- Dialling codes: 06527
- Vehicle registration: BIT
- Website: Bettingen at the Bitburger Land website www.bitburgerland.de

Bettingen is a municipality in the district of Bitburg-Prüm, in Rhineland-Palatinate, western Germany.
