= Gondorf (municipality) =

- Municipality
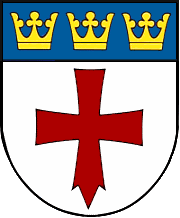
- Coat of arms

- Location of Gondorf within Eifelkreis Bitburg-Prüm district
- Interactive map of Gondorf
- Location within Germany Location within Rhineland-Palatinate
- Coordinates: 49°58′10″N 6°37′05″E
- Country: Germany
- State: Rhineland-Palatinate
- District: Eifelkreis Bitburg-Prüm
- Municipal assoc.: Bitburger Land

Government
  - Mayor (2019–24): Franz-Josef Gasper

Area
  - Total: 3.75 km^{2} (1.45 sq mi)
- Elevation: 310 m (1,020 ft)

Population (2025-12-31)
  - Total: 322
  - Density: 85.9/km^{2} (222/sq mi)
- Time zone: UTC+01:00 (CET)
  - Summer (DST): UTC+02:00 (CEST)
- Postal codes: 54647
- Dialling codes: 06565
- Vehicle registration: BIT
- Website: Gondorf at the Bitburger Land website www.bitburgerland.de

Gondorf is a municipality in the district of Bitburg-Prüm, in Rhineland-Palatinate, western Germany.
