= Seinsfeld =

Municipality in Bitburg-Prüm, Germany

- Municipality
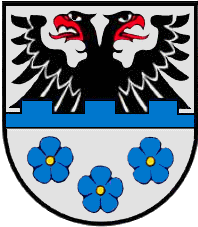
- Coat of arms

- Location of Seinsfeld within Eifelkreis Bitburg-Prüm district
- Interactive map of Seinsfeld
- Location within Germany Location within Rhineland-Palatinate
- Coordinates: 50°03′22″N 6°38′37″E
- Country: Germany
- State: Rhineland-Palatinate
- District: Eifelkreis Bitburg-Prüm
- Municipal assoc.: Bitburger Land

Government
  - Mayor (2020–24): Christian Schon

Area
  - Total: 6.71 km^{2} (2.59 sq mi)
- Elevation: 425 m (1,394 ft)

Population (2025-12-31)
  - Total: 170
  - Density: 25/km^{2} (66/sq mi)
- Time zone: UTC+01:00 (CET)
  - Summer (DST): UTC+02:00 (CEST)
- Postal codes: 54655
- Dialling codes: 06567
- Vehicle registration: BIT
- Website: Seinsfeld at the Bitburger Land website www.bitburgerland.de

Seinsfeld is a municipality in the district of Bitburg-Prüm, in Rhineland-Palatinate, western Germany.
