= Messerich =

- Municipality
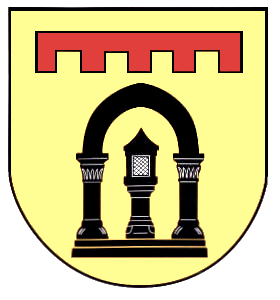
- Coat of arms

- Location of Messerich within Eifelkreis Bitburg-Prüm district
- Interactive map of Messerich
- Location within Germany Location within Rhineland-Palatinate
- Coordinates: 49°56′09″N 6°28′53″E
- Country: Germany
- State: Rhineland-Palatinate
- District: Eifelkreis Bitburg-Prüm
- Municipal assoc.: Bitburger Land

Government
  - Mayor (2019–24): Otmar Schröder

Area
  - Total: 6.52 km^{2} (2.52 sq mi)
- Elevation: 235 m (771 ft)

Population (2025-12-31)
  - Total: 546
  - Density: 83.7/km^{2} (217/sq mi)
- Time zone: UTC+01:00 (CET)
  - Summer (DST): UTC+02:00 (CEST)
- Postal codes: 54636
- Dialling codes: 06568
- Vehicle registration: BIT
- Website: Messerich at the Bitburger Land website www.bitburgerland.de

Messerich is a municipality in the district of Bitburg-Prüm, in Rhineland-Palatinate, western Germany.
