= Gindorf =

- Municipality
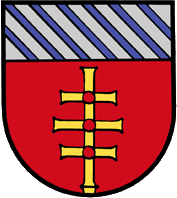
- Coat of arms

- Location of Gindorf within Eifelkreis Bitburg-Prüm district
- Interactive map of Gindorf
- Location within Germany Location within Rhineland-Palatinate
- Coordinates: 50°0′43″N 6°38′41″E
- Country: Germany
- State: Rhineland-Palatinate
- District: Eifelkreis Bitburg-Prüm
- Municipal assoc.: Bitburger Land

Government
  - Mayor (2019–24): Marcus Franzen

Area
  - Total: 6.54 km^{2} (2.53 sq mi)
- Elevation: 368 m (1,207 ft)

Population (2025-12-31)
  - Total: 320
  - Density: 49/km^{2} (130/sq mi)
- Time zone: UTC+01:00 (CET)
  - Summer (DST): UTC+02:00 (CEST)
- Postal codes: 54657
- Dialling codes: 06565
- Vehicle registration: BIT
- Website: Gindorf at the Bitburger Land website www.bitburgerland.de

Gindorf is a municipality in the district of Bitburg-Prüm, in Rhineland-Palatinate, western Germany.
