= Our Natural Park =

Nature park in Luxembourg

- Luxembourgish: Naturpark Our
- IUCN category V (protected landscape/seascape)
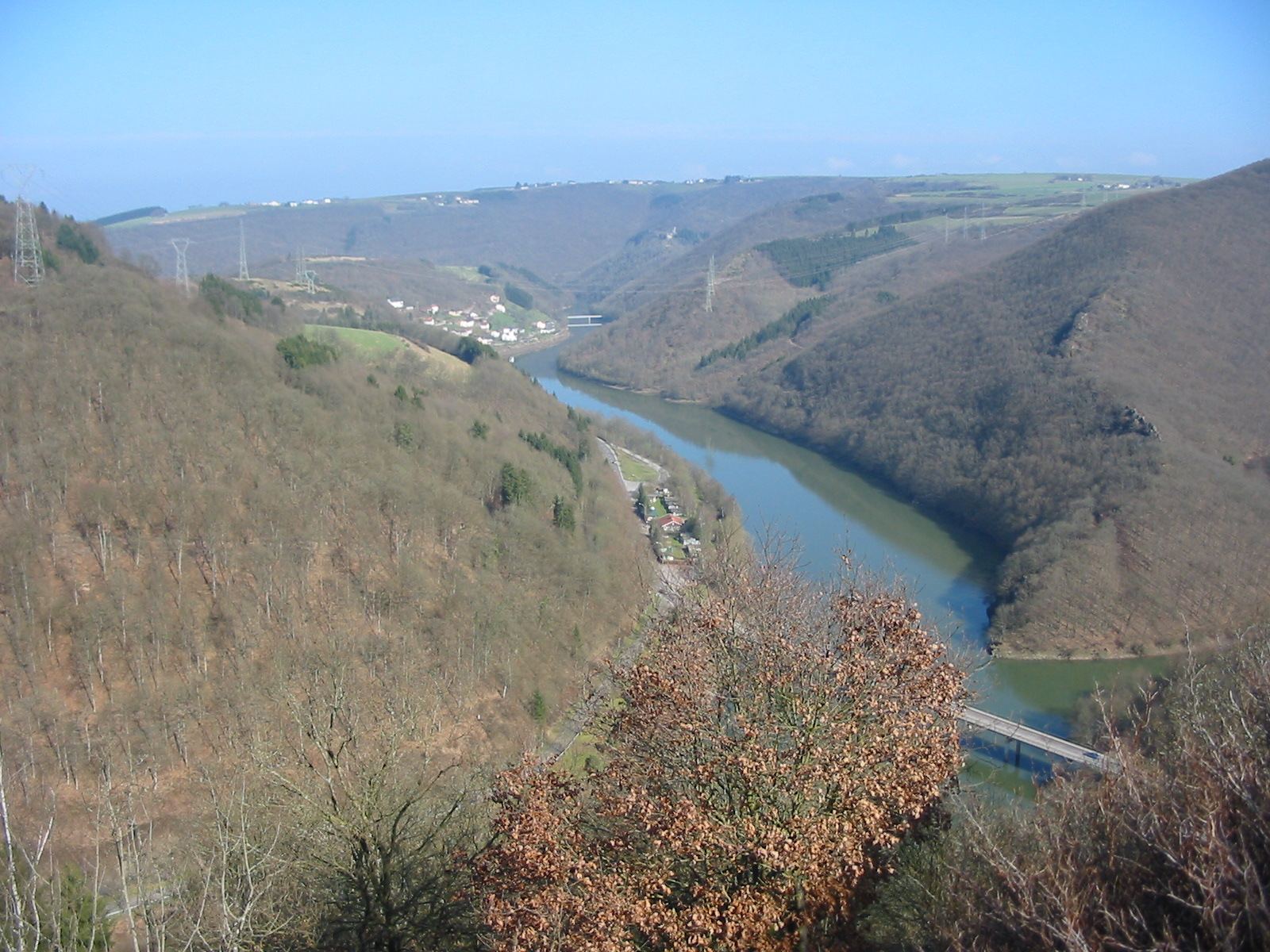
- Our valley near Vianden

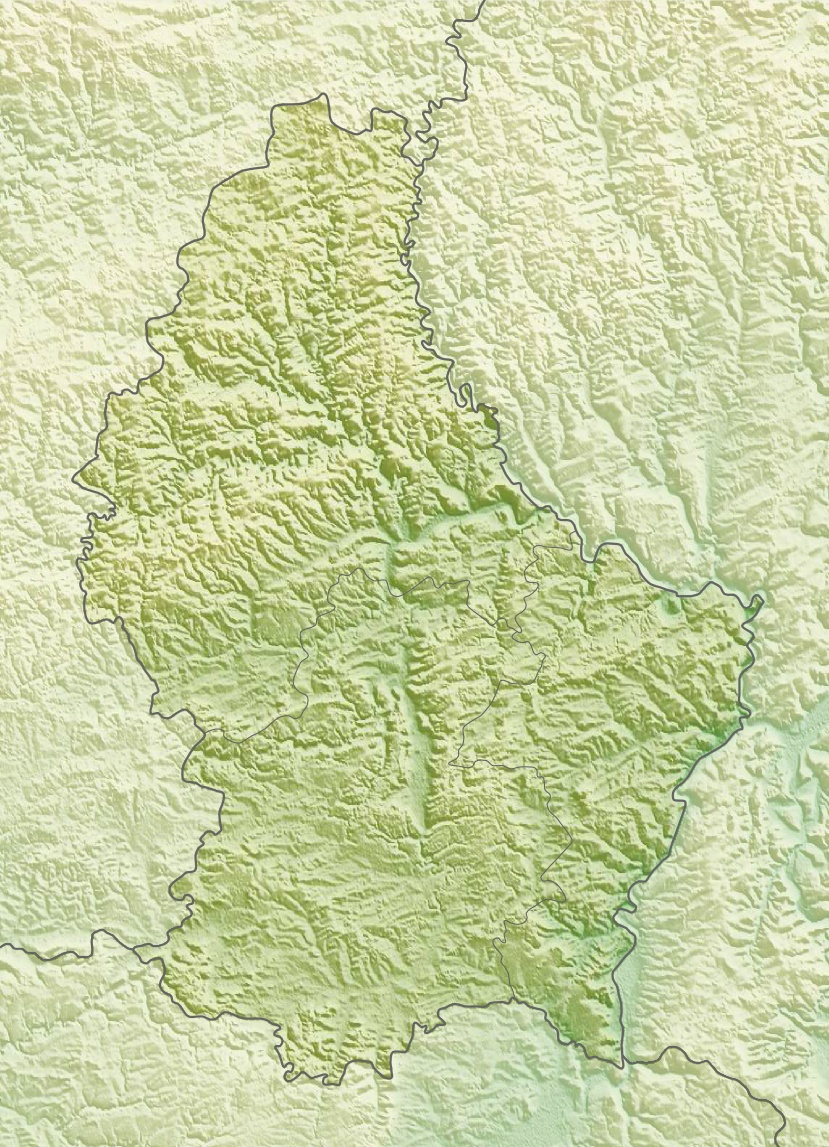
- Location within Luxembourg
- Interactive map of Our Natural Park
- Location: Luxembourg
- Coordinates: 50°00′N 6°06′E
- Area: 420.26 km^{2} (162.26 sq mi)
- Created: 1965
- Website: naturpark-our.lu

The Our Nature Park (Luxembourgish: Naturpark Our) is a nature park in north-eastern Luxembourg.

== Geography ==
The park is located in the Ardennes on the Luxembourg side of the Our river, on the north-eastern edge of Luxembourg in the border triangle with Belgium and Germany. It covers an area of 419.77 km^{2} and with around 16,000 inhabitants the area of the 7 municipalities Clervaux, Kiischpelt, Parc Hosingen, Putscheid, Tandel, Troisvierges and Vianden. It is part of the binational German-Luxembourg Nature Park and borders with the German-Belgian High Fens – Eifel Nature Park.

== Landscape and ecology ==
The area consists largely of a plateau formed from shale rock, which lies at an altitude of about 500 m. It is broken through by numerous valleys such as those of the Our and Clerve. While the steep slopes of these valleys are mostly forested, the plateaus are more densely populated and are also used more intensively for agriculture. There are many wet biotopes in the river valleys as well as on the plateaus, which represent important habitats for endangered animal and plant species. A major ecological problem in the park is the conversion of the original deciduous and mixed forest and the tan hedges that characterize the landscape into spruce monocultures due to intensive forest use in recent decades. Nevertheless, several thousand hectares of tan hedges have been preserved, which still characterize the landscape over long stretches.

== Wildlife ==
The endangered black stork nests here, the freshwater pearl mussel, the wild cat and the hazel grouse can also be found here. The park has been designated an Important Bird Area (IBA) by BirdLife International because it supports significant populations of hazel grouse, black storks, European honey-buzzards and red kites.

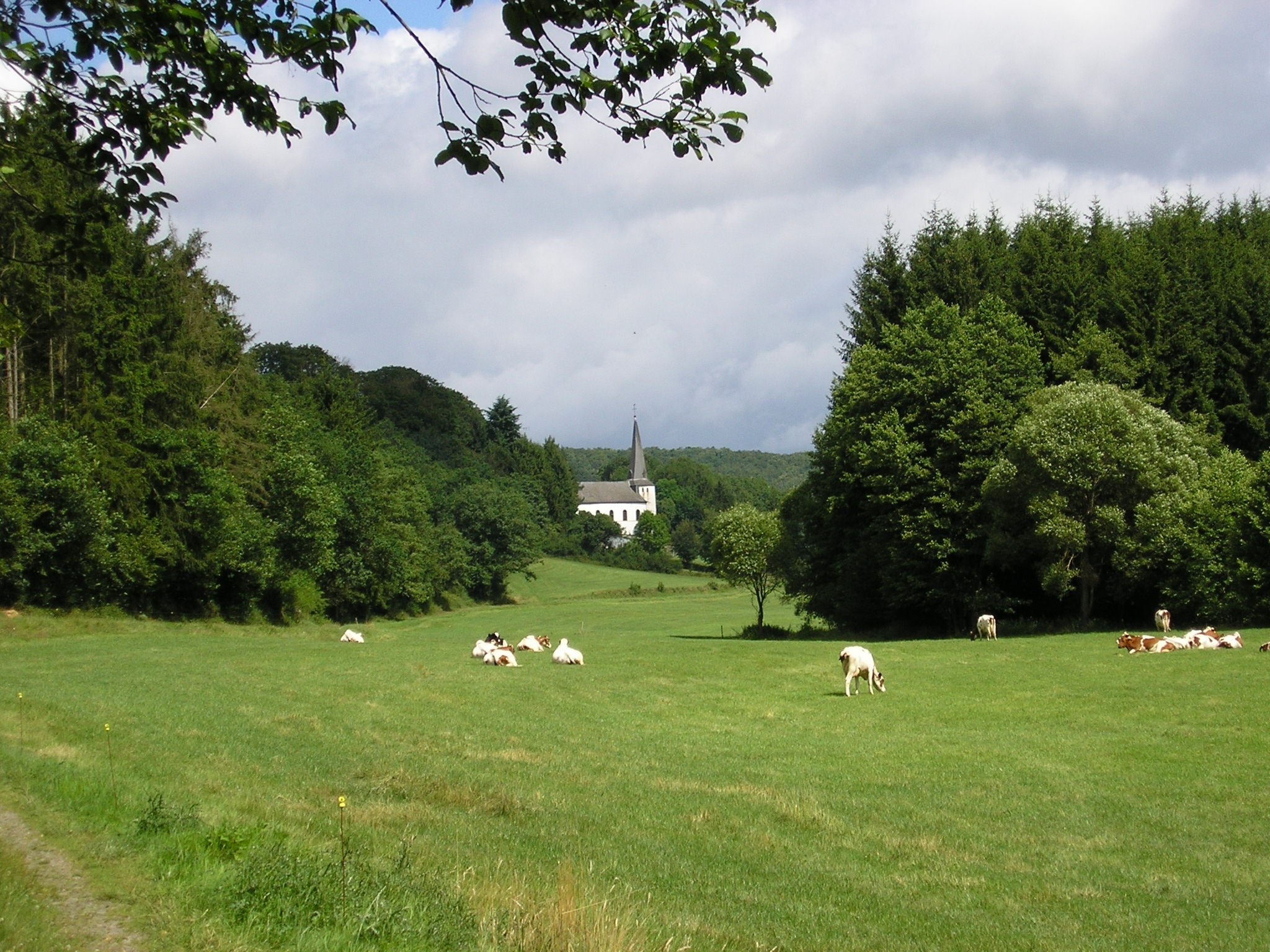
Near Pintsch, municipality of Kiischpelt.

== Access ==
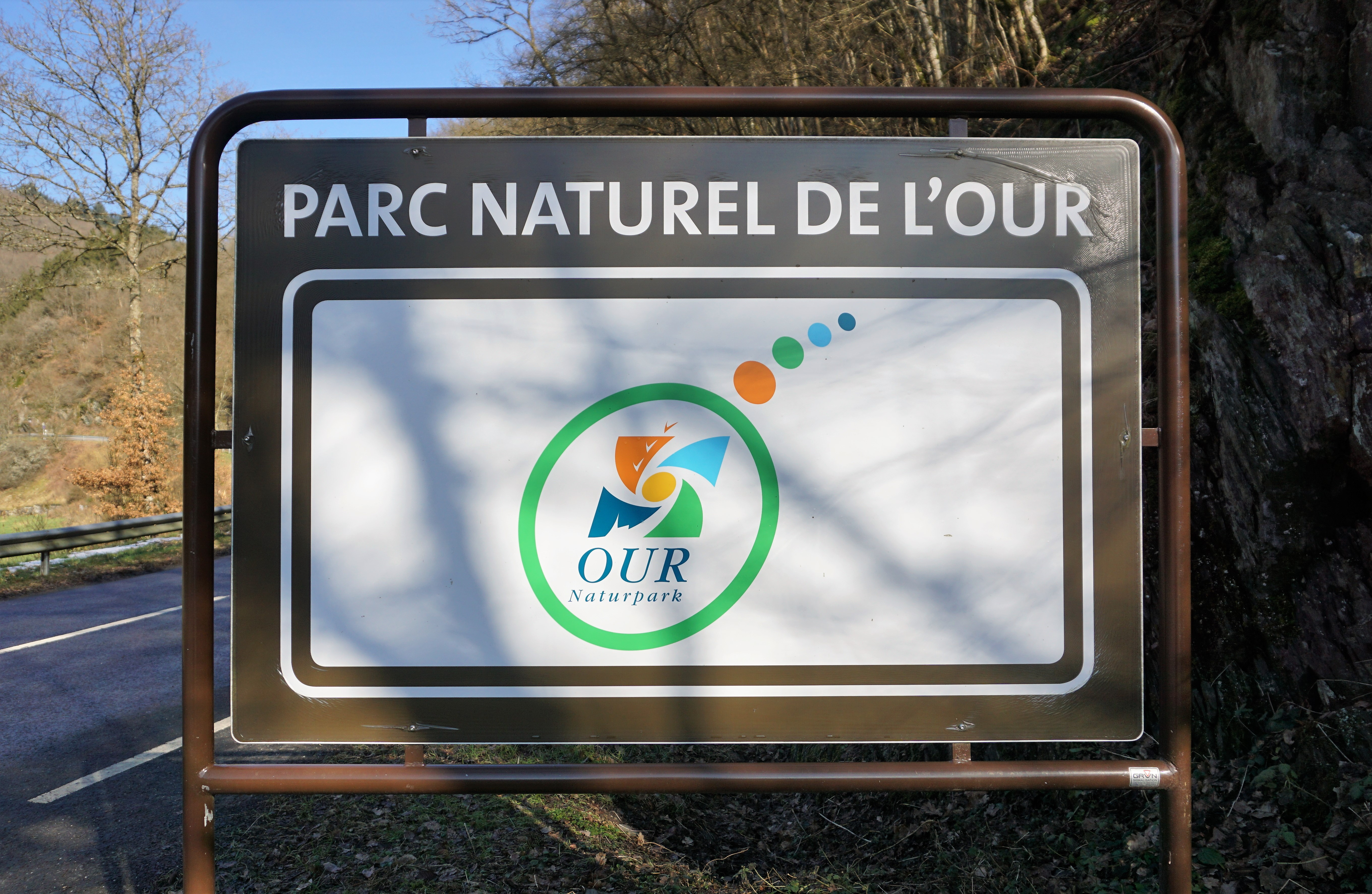
Signpost to the Nature park Our in the Ënnerschlënner.

The park is a popular hiking area, with numerous long-distance and themed hiking trails and educational trails. There are also many cycle paths and mountain bike trails, as well as Nordic walking trails and high ropes courses. Furthermore, the numerous castles, especially Vianden Castle, are of great importance for tourism. Other sights include the Vianden Pumped Storage Plant, the world-famous photo exhibition The Family of Man and the Benedictine Abbey in Clervaux, the border triangle near Ouren, the tunnels of the copper mine in Stolzembourg and the escape route around Troisvierges. The visitor center of the nature park is in Hosingen.

== History ==
The forerunner of the nature park can be found in Second French Empire of and much later it was the municipal association SIVOR (Syndicat intercommunal de la vallée de l'Our), which was formed in 1992 by the municipalities of Heinerscheid, Hosingen, Putscheid, Vianden and Weiswampach. In 1995 Bastendorf, Consthum, Fouhren, Hoscheid and Munshausen joined, and by 1998 SIVOR had been expanded to include the communities of Clervaux, Troisvierges and Wilwerwiltz to 13 communities. In 1994, the foundation of the nature park was tackled on the basis of the nature park law of 1993. The concept was developed by 2003, and the ordinance of the nature park came into force on June 9, 2005. The smaller number of participating communities today is based on the one hand on community mergers in 2006, when Bastendorf and Fouhren merged to form the new community of Tandel, while at the same time Wilwerwiltz and Kautenbach merged to form the community of Kiischpelt. On the other hand, the municipality of Weiswampach did not join the nature park. Further church mergers in 2011 led to a further reduction in the number of member churches to seven.

== See also ==
- German-Luxembourg Nature Park
- High Fens – Eifel Nature Park
- Upper Sûre Natural Park
- Clervaux
- Vianden
- Vianden Castle
