= Untereisenbach =

Village in Luxembourg

Untereisenbach Ënnereesbech
- Village
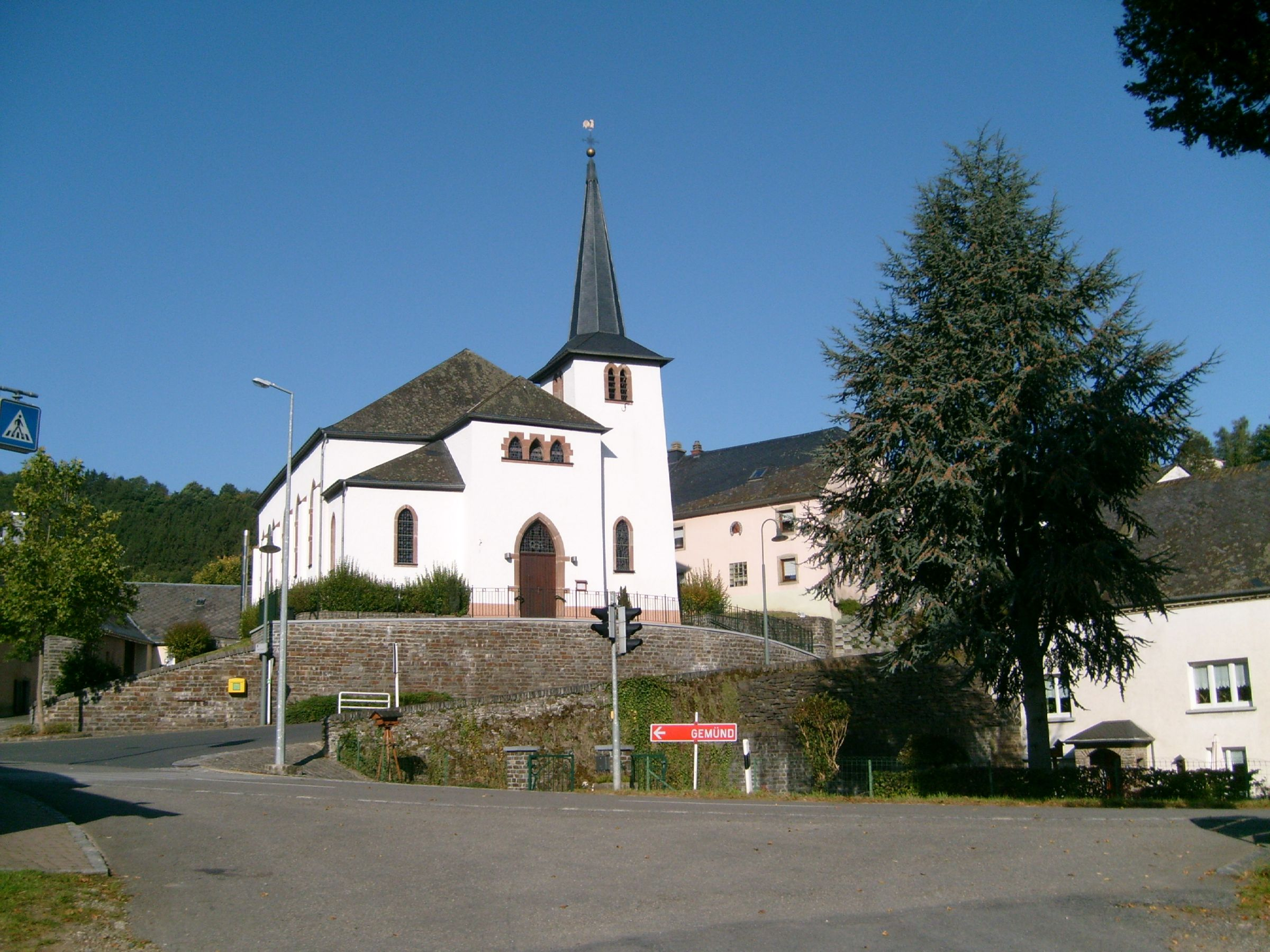
- Near Untereisenbach church
- Interactive map of Untereisenbach
- Coordinates: 50°00′02″N 06°08′42″E
- Country: Luxembourg
- Canton: Clervaux
- Commune: Parc Hosingen
- Elevation: 252 m (827 ft)

Population (2026)
  - Total: 303
- Eisenbach locality (incl. Obereisenbach)
- Time zone: UTC+1 (CET)
  - Summer (DST): UTC+2 (CEST)
- Postcode: 9838

Untereisenbach (German: [ˈʊntɐˌʔaɪzn̩bax]; Luxembourgish: Ënnereesbech or Eesbech) is a village in the commune of Parc Hosingen, in the Canton of Clervaux in northern Luxembourg. As of September 2026, the locality of Eisenbach (comprising Untereisenbach and Obereisenbach) has a population of 303.

== Geography ==
Untereisenbach lies in the Oesling region on the western bank of the Our, which forms the border between Luxembourg and Germany. The village sits at an elevation of approximately 252 metres. Directly across the river is the German village of Übereisenbach in Rhineland-Palatinate. The adjacent hamlet of Obereisenbach lies slightly to the north along the river bank; the three localities once formed a single settlement known as Eisenbach. A road bridge over the Our connects Untereisenbach with Übereisenbach.

== History ==
The settlement of Eisenbach was first recorded around 450 AD during the Frankish period. By the 13th century the combined community of Unter-, Ober-, and Übereisenbach belonged to the County of Luxembourg. Following the Congress of Vienna (1814–15) and a subsequent 1816 border treaty between the Netherlands and Prussia, the Our was established as the international boundary. Übereisenbach was assigned to Prussia, while Untereisenbach and Obereisenbach remained in the Grand Duchy of Luxembourg.

Untereisenbach was part of the commune of Hosingen until 1 January 2012, when Hosingen merged with Consthum and Hoscheid to form Parc Hosingen.

== Landmarks ==
The village has a church dedicated to Saint Willibrord, the patron saint of Luxembourg.

== See also ==
- List of villages in Luxembourg
