= Ouren Castle =

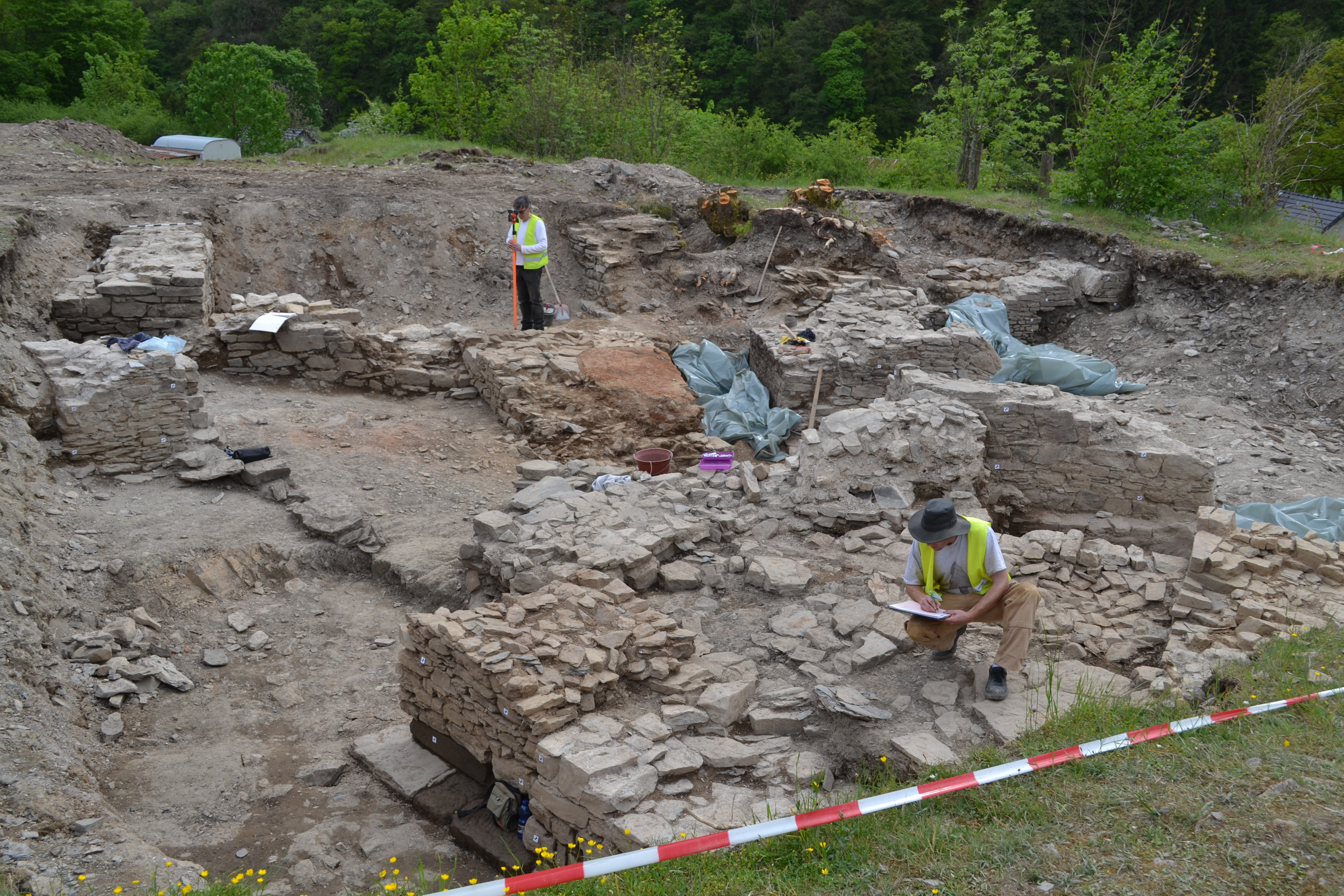

- Location within Belgium

General information
- Type: hillside castle, settlement
- Classification: Ruins
- Location: Ouren
- Coordinates: 50°8′N 6°8′E
- Completed: 11/12th century
- Owner: Gentry

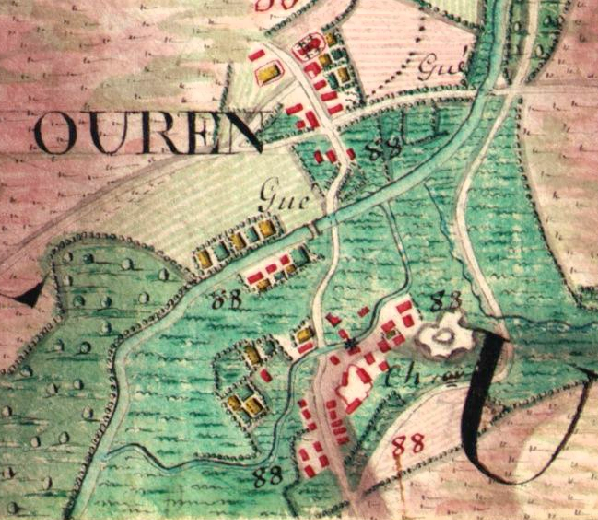
Ouren Castle on the Ferraris-Map of 1777.

Ouren Castle is a castle ruin in Ouren in the East Cantons of Belgium. It was the ancestral seat of the lineage of the free nobles of Ouren.

Dating back to the 11th century, the site was originally a segmented, fortified castle fortress with a palas, a bergfried and a chapel in the higher-located northern part of the castle hill. The outer bailey with the service buildings were situated in the southern area.

During the Late Middle Ages the castle gradually lost its fortified character in favour of the living comfort of its noble inhabitants. Between 1535 and 1615, periods of modification mark the changes to the residence of the nobility. A re-drawing in the lost watercolour by Joseph-Ernest Buschmann (1814-1853) from the mid-19th century shows the site as a – probably romanticized – Baroque castle. After its demolishment by French Revolutionary troops in 1794 the castle became uninhabitable and was nearly fully demolished after 1845.

== Location and topography ==
The castle ruin is located in the southern part of East Belgium, close to the borders of Luxembourg. The castle plateau is situated on a shale rock which is protruding by an off-set into the valley of the river Our. To the North, West and East the castle hill is surrounded by the river Our. Through a slight depression in the South the access to the castle plateau is attained. Mostly timbered ridges of mountains of the East Ardennes are extending on both sides of the stream course on altitudes of approximately 400 to 539 meters above level Ostend (m O.P.).

== History ==
The exact moment of the foundation of the castle is unknown. The lineage of the noble free lords of Ouren is already documented from the 11th century. The castle as such is mentioned in a deed from the end of the 12th century (1190-1198) in which Henry of Sponheim enfeoffed his part of the castle from the archbishop of Treves John I.

Coat of Arms of the Lords of Ouren from the House Malberg.

After the extinction of the male hereditary line, the castle and the sovereignty became subject to the House of Malberg. During the last decade of the 14th century the castle was pledged to the archbishop of Treves, Werner of Falkenstein. In consequence, the castle was besieged in 1394 and occupied during a feud between the archbishop and the Lords of Aremberg by Eberhard of the Mark and his son John. However, the soldiers of the archbishop succeeded in the reconquest of the castle only within the same year.

Thus, the castle and the sovereignty of Ouren remained in the exclusive ownership of the House Malberg. Likewise, in 1517 the castle and sovereignty was separated between the Houses of Malberg and Giltingen by marriage.

In 1614 the property was disputed as Gerhard of the Horst who was married to the daughter of Gerhard of Malbergs claimed the title. During the 17th century the castle and sovereignty got into the ownership of the Family of Ouren which referred to themselves as the Lords of Ouren, Tavigny, Limbach and Feilen. In 1680 their son John Francis Ignaz of Ouren leased the castle and the sovereignty to Peter de la Branche. In 1690 the demise charter was renewed for several six years.

By the marriage of Mary Sidonie of Ouren (*1643) with John Lambert of Dobbelstein the possessions were separated again. After the death of Veronica of Ouren, the widow of John Francis Ignaz of Ouren in 1733, the castle and sovereignty eventually became the property of the House Dobbelstein. The lineage became extinct by the death of Carl August of Dobbelstein. In the last instance, Ouren Castle was property of the Baron of Taverne.

The demolishment of the castle was conducted in 1795 by French Revolutionary troops. In 1798 revolters entrenched themselves in the ruins during the Peasants War.

Ouren Castle was auctioned twice in 1844 and 1845 and finally left abandoned.

The only known depiction of Ouren Castle is a pen drawing according to a lost water colour by Joseph-Ernest Buschmann from the first half of the 19th century.

== The castle ruin nowadays ==
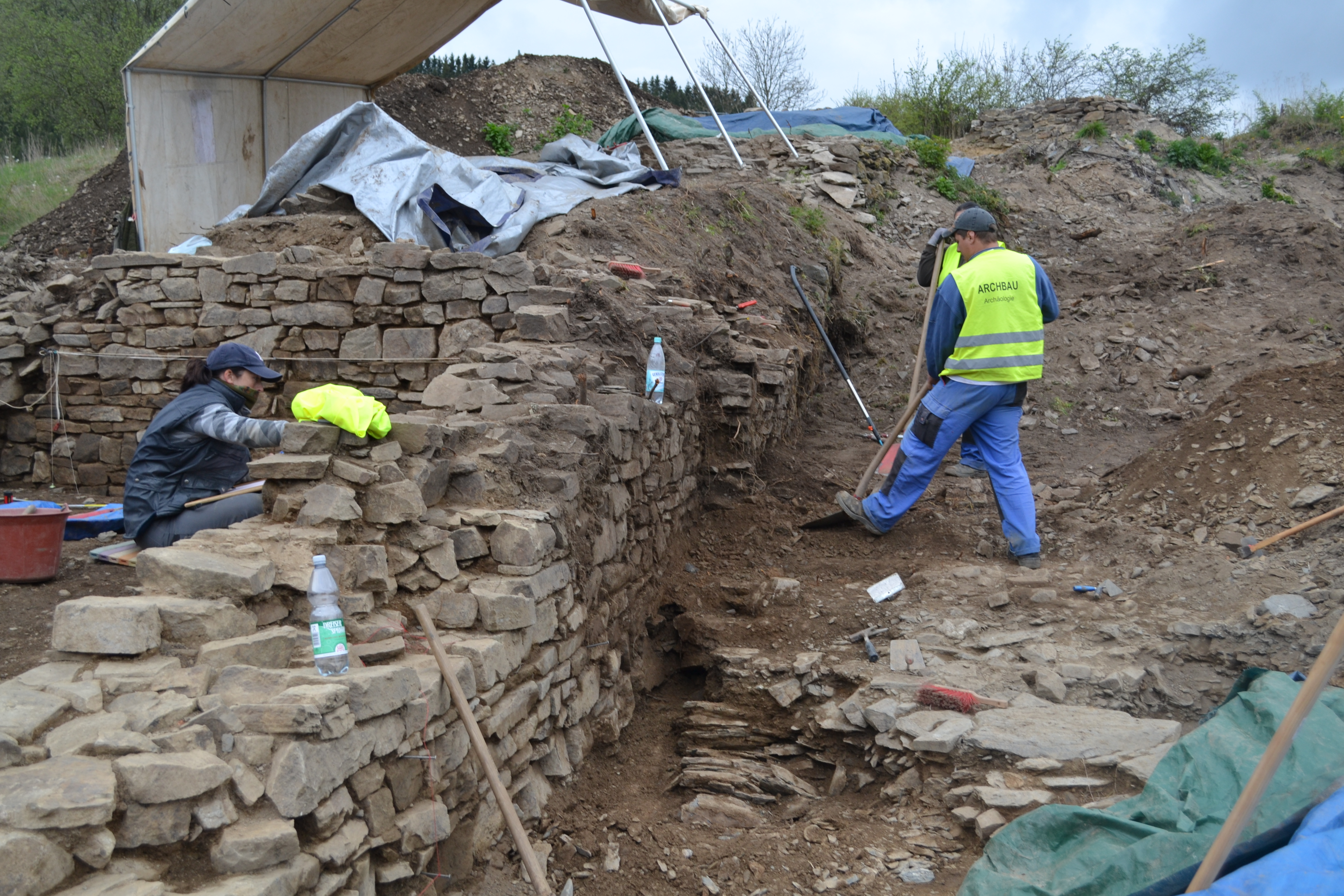
Excavation of the Archaeological Department of the German-speaking community on the castle hill of Ouren in spring 2014.

Today the former castle is considered an archaeological site. On the surface there are still remains of the foundations and parts of the former enclosing walls visible. Because of the scanty written sources, knowledge of the building history and historical development of the castle and the place is only attainable by archaeological methods.

Since 2012 the Archaeological Department of the German-speaking community of Belgium has been conducting excavations on the castle hill. Prior to that, the Société Archeologique du Sillon Mosan (S.O.S. fouilles) conducted its research on the subject in autumn 1988 and January 1989 which was only scanty documented.
