= Holzthum Hoard =

4th-century Roman coin hoard found in Luxembourg

Holtzthum Hoard
- Material: 141 solidii
- Created: 364–408 AD
- Discovered: Holzthum, Luxembourg
- Discovered by: Jos Müller, Cliff Nosbusch
- Culture: Late Roman Empire
- https://chre.ashmus.ox.ac.uk/hoard/21257

The Holzthum Hoard is a Late Roman coin hoard dating to the late 4th century found in the village of Holzthum, Luxembourg. The cache consists of a total of 141 solidii issued by nine consecutive Roman emperors, who reigned between 364 and 408 AD. The discovery is the result of four years of excavation by Luxembourg's Institut National de Recherches Archéologiques (INRA) and the Luxembourg Army Mine Action Service (SEDAL).

== Discovery ==
Holzthum is situated in the Parc Hosingen commune of Luxembourg. In 2019, a pair of amateur archaeologists, Jos Müller and Cliff Nosbusch, were scouting for potsherds in a field. Müller caught a glimpse of gold on the surface of the soil, revealing a solidus in near-mint condition. This first coin was found on 11 November, after a tractor had ploughed through the field where it was hidden. The coins were found when the two men were about to leave, as they hadn't found anything interesting by then. Within the span of an hour, 40 coins were detected with metal detectors. The detectorists reported the find to the INRA, which initiated a coordinated excavation of the site through 2020–2024. The Holzthum find was the first gold coin discovery in Luxembourg after the 1958 discovery at Machtum. The Holzthum hoard is also the biggest gold coin discovery in Luxembourg, even larger than the large hoard found at Machtum.

As a result of the excavations, the field was scientifically documented and identified as a burgus, a Late Roman military fort, based on the foundations of the building the cache was deposited in. A total of 141 solidi were subsequently extracted, a hypothesis Müller had long assumed when searching the site. Three to four circular ditches and two wells were also found, along with some children's shoes, which implies soldiers' families stayed with them at the site. The burgus was constructed sometime between the 2nd and 4th centuries. Luxembourg compensated the original finders of the site a sum of 308,600 Euros for the discovery. SEDAL assisted in the finds due to past documentation of World War II-era mines and munitions buried in the locality, as the site had witnessed intense combat during the Battle of the Bulge.

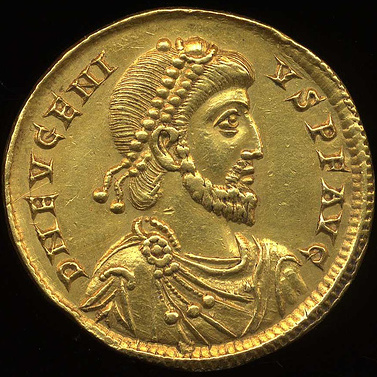
A solidus of Eugenius

== Content ==
The 141 solidi consists of coins issued by nine Roman emperors: Valentinian I, Valens, Gratian, Valentinian II, Theodosius I, Honorius, Arcadius, Magnus Maximus; and the usurper Eugenius, with three solidii attributed to him minted in Lugdunum, modern day Lyon. One coin was identified as a fourrée. The coins discovered at Holzthum were minted at nine imperial mints: Trier, Rome, Milan, Arles, Mitrovica, Constantinople, Antakya, Smyrna and Aquileia with 17 of the solidi deriving from Nicomedia, indicating westward travels, and also the biggest hoard from this mintage. They were struck between the years of 364-395, with a terminus mintage of 402, which was a variant from Mediolanum/Milan.

Even though the coins had traveled a long distance, they showed few signs of usage, which implies they were not in circulation for long and buried by a visitor to the adjacent burgus. According to Rebecca Usherwood, a professor at Trinity College Dublin, the coins most probably belonged to a wealthy military official who buried them before a skirmish so they could be recovered later. Each coin weighs 4.5 grams (0.16 oz), for a total of more than 0.6 kilograms (1.3 lb) of gold, an astonishing sum at a time when most Roman citizens would never see a single gold coin throughout their lives. The hoard is probably part of a group of other similar hoards found between the Moselle river and the Limes Germanicus border defenses on the Lower Rhine river in the Roman province of Germania Inferior. Another theory suggests the hoard is a collection of payments made by the Romans to the Germanic tribes in the area to maintain peace.

As a usurper emperor whose reign only lasted from 392–394, Eugenius' brief reign saw clashes with Theodosius I and his subsequent demise at the Battle of the Frigidus in September 394, this resulted in a scarcity of his coins. One extant solidus of the variants found in this cache (Roman Imperial Coinage IX Lugdunum 45) was also found in the Hoxne Hoard, now at the British Museum. The three Eugenius coins are valued at 50,000 Euros each. The hoard was subsequently registered in the University of Oxford Coin Hoards of the Roman Empire database in January 2025 under Designation No. 21257.

Hoard Content and Breakdown
Reigning Emperor	Mintage	Quantity
Valentinian I	Antioch (Syria)	19
Valentinian I	Aquileia	2
Valentinian I	Arles (Arelate)	4
Valentinian I	Cyzicus (Mysia)	1
Valentinian I	Lyon (Lugdunum)	2
Valentinian I	Milan (Mediolanum)	1
Valentinian I	Nicomedia (Bithynia)	9
Valentinian I	Rome	6
Valentinian I	Thessalonica (Macedonia)	1
Valentinian I	Trier (Treveri)	12
House of Valentinian	Uncertain	1
House of Valentinian	Uncertain (Imitation)	1
Valens	Antioch (Syria)	13
Valens	Arles (Arelate)	3
Valens	Milan (Mediolanum)	4
Valens	Nicomedia (Bithynia)	8
Valens	Rome	2
Valens	Trier (Treveri)	9
Gratian	Antioch (Syria)	1
Gratian	Aquileia	2
Gratian	Milan (Mediolanum)	2
Gratian	Thessalonica (Macedonia)	1
Gratian	Trier (Treveri)	7
Valentinian II	Constantinople	3
Valentinian II	Lyon (Lugdunum)	1
Valentinian II	Thessalonica (Macedonia)	1
Valentinian II	Trier (Treveri)	8
Theodosius I	Constantinople	4
Theodosius I	Milan (Mediolanum)	1
Theodosius I	Thessalonica (Macedonia)	1
Eugenius	Lyon (Lugdunum)	1
Eugenius	Trier (Treveri)	2
Theodosius I	Constantinople	4
Theodosius I	Milan (Mediolanum)	2
Theodosius I	Sirmium	2

== Sources ==
- Nonet, Erwan (6 December 2024). "Histoire en or massif" [History in Solid Gold]. Lëtzeburger Land (in French).
- Schoellen, André (29 January 2025). "Largest Hoard of Ancient Gold Coins Discovered in Luxembourg". CoinsWeekly.
- Thill, Marc (7 December 2024). "Das Flüstern der Münzen: Das römische Gold birgt weiterhin Geheimnisse" [The Whisper of Coins: Roman Gold Continues to Hold Secrets]. Luxemburger Wort (in German).
