= Hosingen =

Hosingen Housen
- Former commune
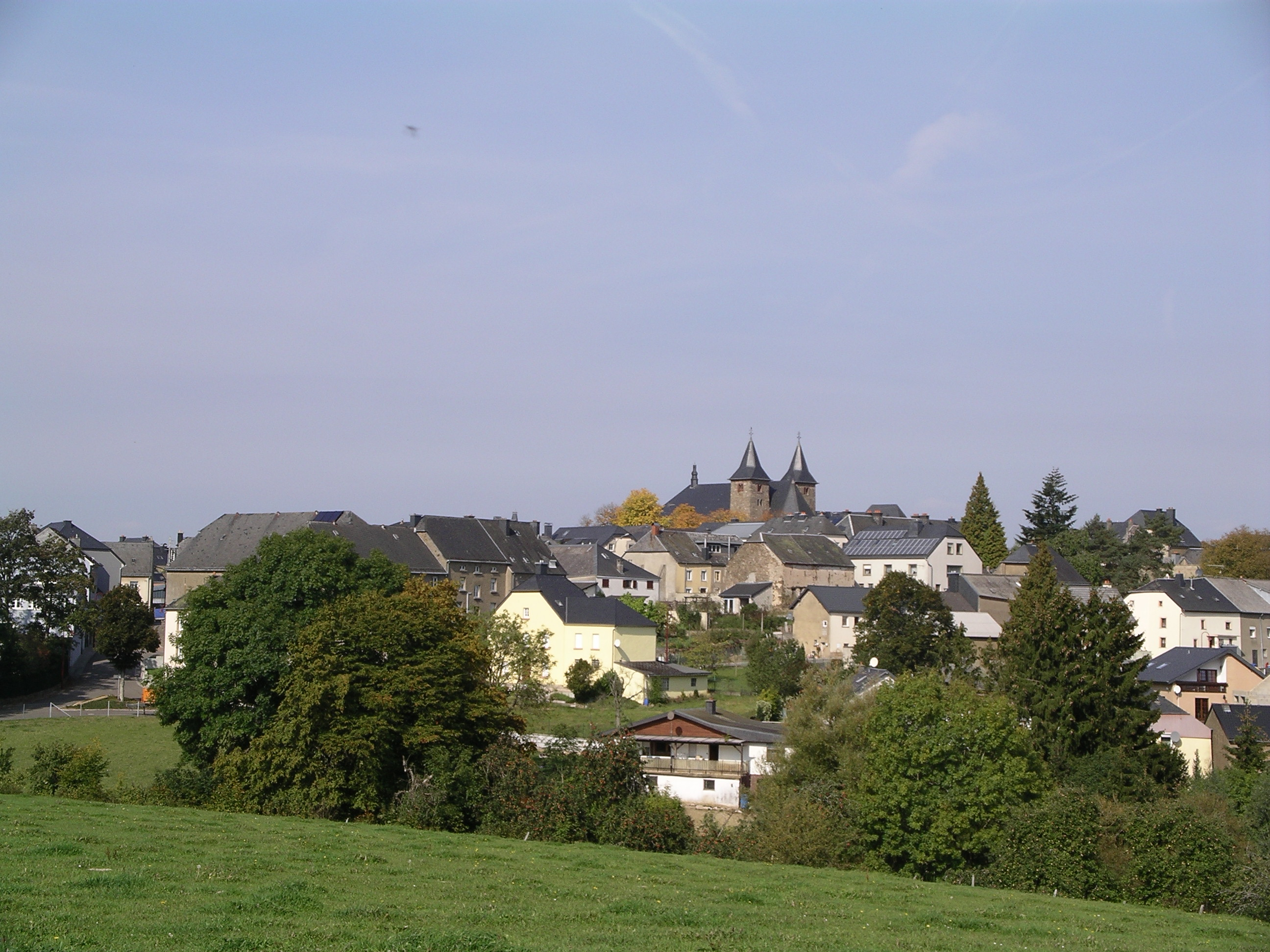
- Hosingen

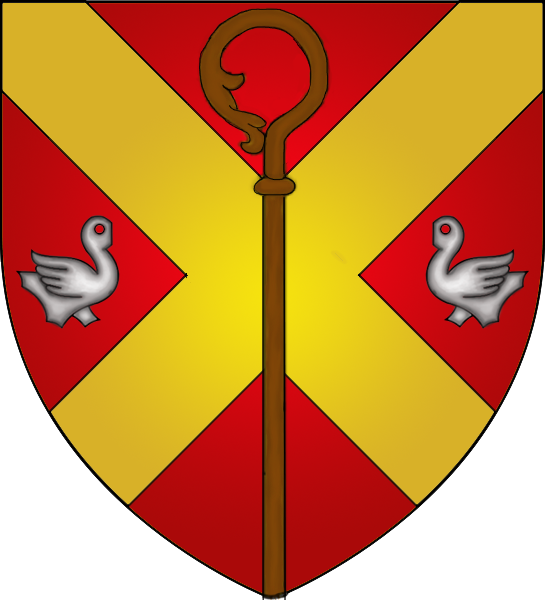
- Coat of arms

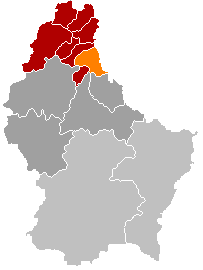
- Map of Luxembourg with Hosingen highlighted in orange, and the canton in dark red
- Coordinates: 50.0139°N 6.0903°E
- Country: Luxembourg
- Canton: Clervaux
- Time zone: UTC+1 (CET)
  - Summer (DST): UTC+2 (CEST)
- Website: hosingen.lu

Hosingen (German pronunciation: [ˈhoːzɪŋən]; Luxembourgish: Housen) is a small village and former commune in northern Luxembourg.

On January 1, 2012, the commune merged with Consthum and Hoscheid communes to form the new commune of Parc Hosingen.

Near Hosingen there is a transmitter for FM and TV of RTL.

As of September 2026, the village of Hosingen, which lies in the south of the commune, had a population of 1,502.

== Former commune ==
The former commune consisted of the villages:

- Bockholtz
- Dorscheid
- Hosingen
- Neidhausen
- Obereisenbach
- Rodershausen
- Untereisenbach
- Wahlhausen
- Ackerscheid (lieu-dit)
- Dickt (lieu-dit)
- Dasbourg-Pont (lieu-dit)
- Duerschterhaischen (lieu-dit)
- Fennbierg (lieu-dit)
- Honich (lieu-dit)
- Housenerbarrière (lieu-dit)
- Kohnenhaff (lieu-dit)
- Schmitzdell (lieu-dit)
- Veianenerstross (lieu-dit)
- Waldberg (lieu-dit)
- Wegscheid (lieu-dit)
