= Wahlhausen, Luxembourg =

Wahlhausen Wuelessen
- Village
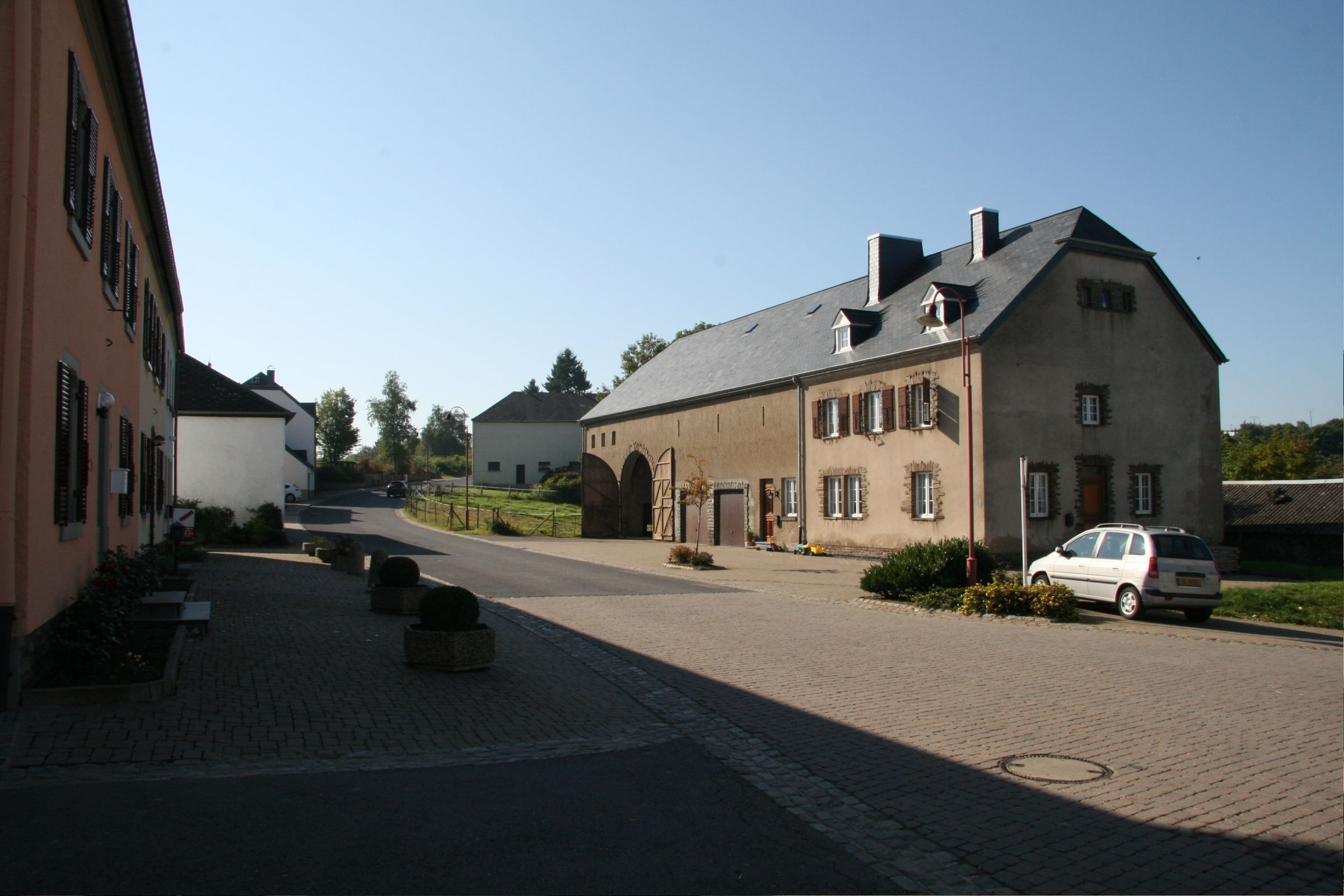

- Location within Luxembourg
- Coordinates: 49°59′N 6°08′E
- Country: Luxembourg
- Commune: Parc Hosingen

Population (2026)
  - Total: 496

Wahlhausen (German pronunciation: [vaːlˈhaʊzn̩]; Luxembourgish: Wuelessen) is a village in the commune of Parc Hosingen, in northern Luxembourg. As of September 2026, the village has a population of 496.

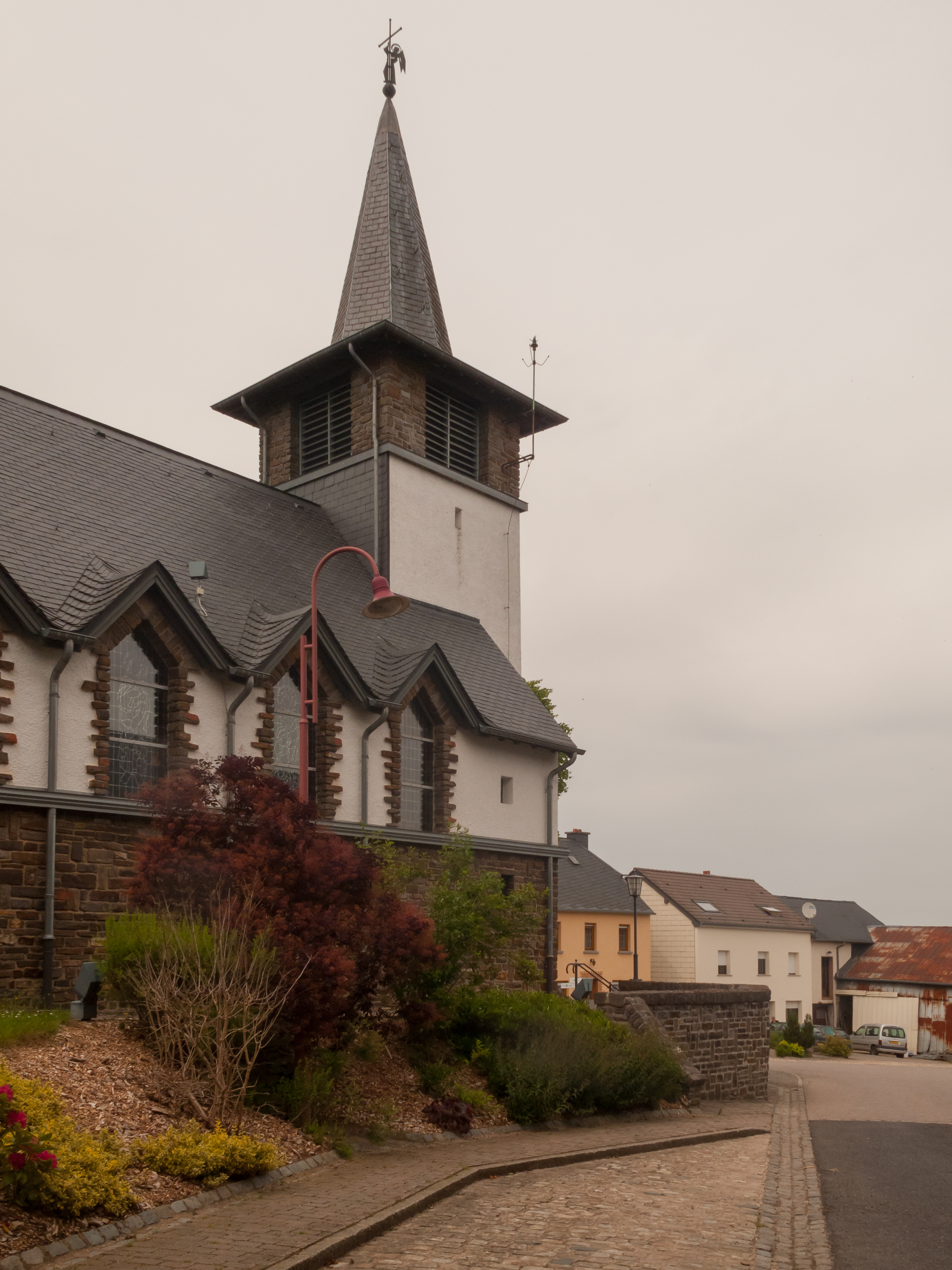
Churchtower in the street
