= Ouren =

Coordinates: 50°08′N 6°08′E

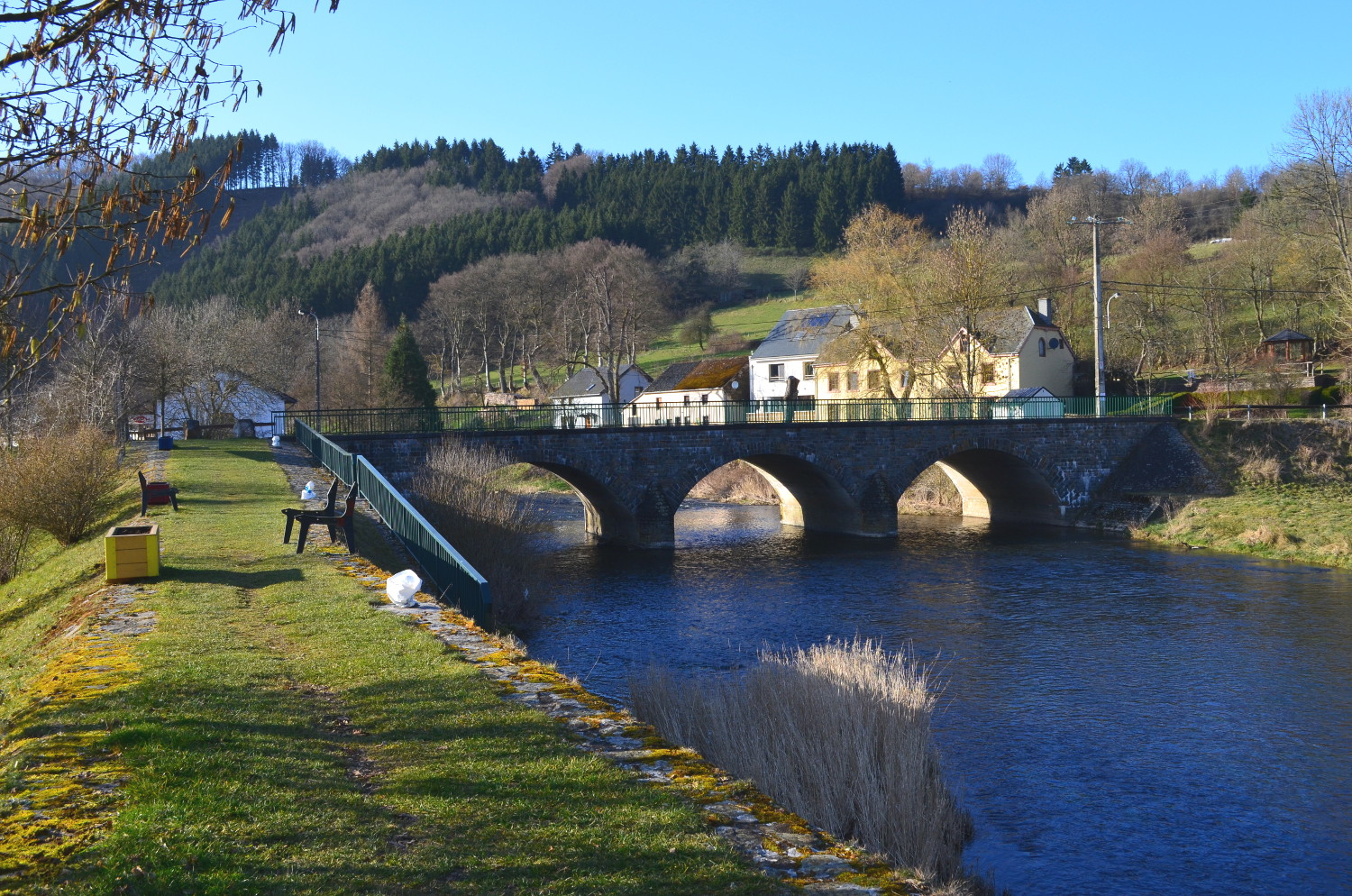
Bridge over the river Our at Ouren.

Ouren is a village in Belgium with a population of 129 inhabitants. Ouren is a part of the municipality of Burg-Reuland and thus belongs to the German-speaking Community of Belgium.

== Geography ==
Ouren is located at the border triangle of Belgium-Germany-Luxembourg. All of the borders are tangent in the middle of the river Our.

== History ==
Ouren Castle was founded approximately during the 11th or 12th century. For the first time it was mentioned in 1095 in connection with one of the lords of Ouren, Rycardis de Hunrin. It is assumed that at this point, Ouren Castle has already existed. In 1365 the Castle was merged into the ownership of the family of Malberg by marriage of William von Malberg with Elizabeth von Ouren. Shortly after, Castle Ouren was pledged to the archbishop of Treves. During the events of a feud between the archbishop Werner von Falkenstein and Eberhard von der Marck-Arenberg the fortification was besieged and taken by soldiers of the archbishop under leadership of Peter von Kronenburg.

After the end of the War of the Spanish Succession, Ouren became a part of the Austrian Netherlands between 1714 until 1795. In 1795 Castle Ouren was destroyed by troops of the French Revolution. During the Peasants’ War rioters barricaded themselves in the ruins of the castle. However, they had to abandon themselves to the French after a short combat.

In 1815, during the Congress of Vienna, Ouren became a part of the Prussian kingdom together with Eupen and Malmedy. In 1844 and 1845 the unoccupied castle was auctioned and left opened to demolition. Nowadays, only a few remains of the wall are present. As a result of the First World War and according to the Treaty of Versailles Ouren was added to Belgium.

== Sights ==
=== Europe Monument ===
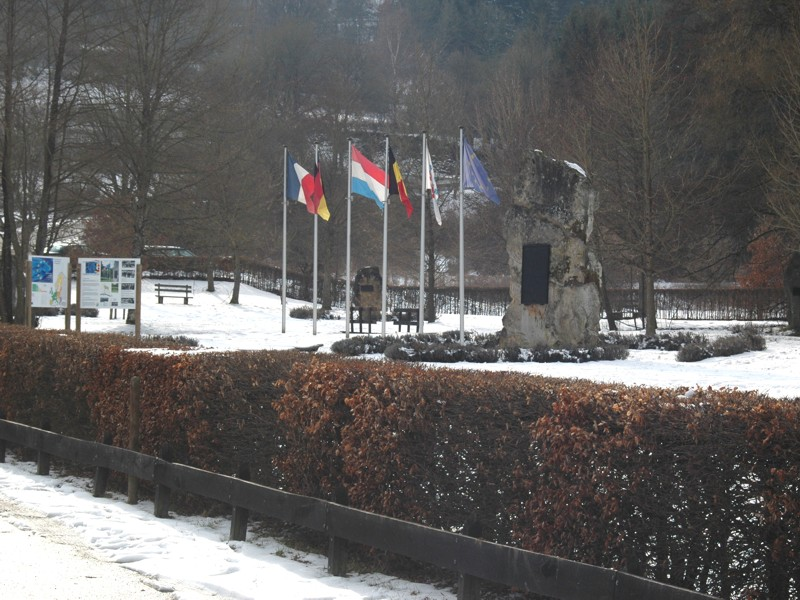
Europe Monument Ouren

By leaving the centre of Ouren in the direction of the town of Heinerscheid in Luxembourg, the confluence of the Ribbach and the Our is reached after a short time. At this point the Europe Monument is located, which was consecrated on 22 October 1977. The Monument was built on the initiative of Georg Wagner, the president of the confederation of the Eifel and Ardennes, assemblyman and president of the Luxembourg chamber. The Europe Monument is surrounded by a green space of five monumental boulders, information panels and flagpoles. On four stones the names of the "Protagonists of a united Europe" (Konrad Adenauer, Joseph Bech, Paul-Henri Spaak and Robert Schuman) are engraved. The fifth stone commemorates the Treaty of Rome and the signatories of the six states involved. Near the Europe Monument and close to the border triangle is a pedestrian bridge connecting Germany and Belgium via the River Our which is named after Georg Wagner.

=== Church of St Peter and Paul ===
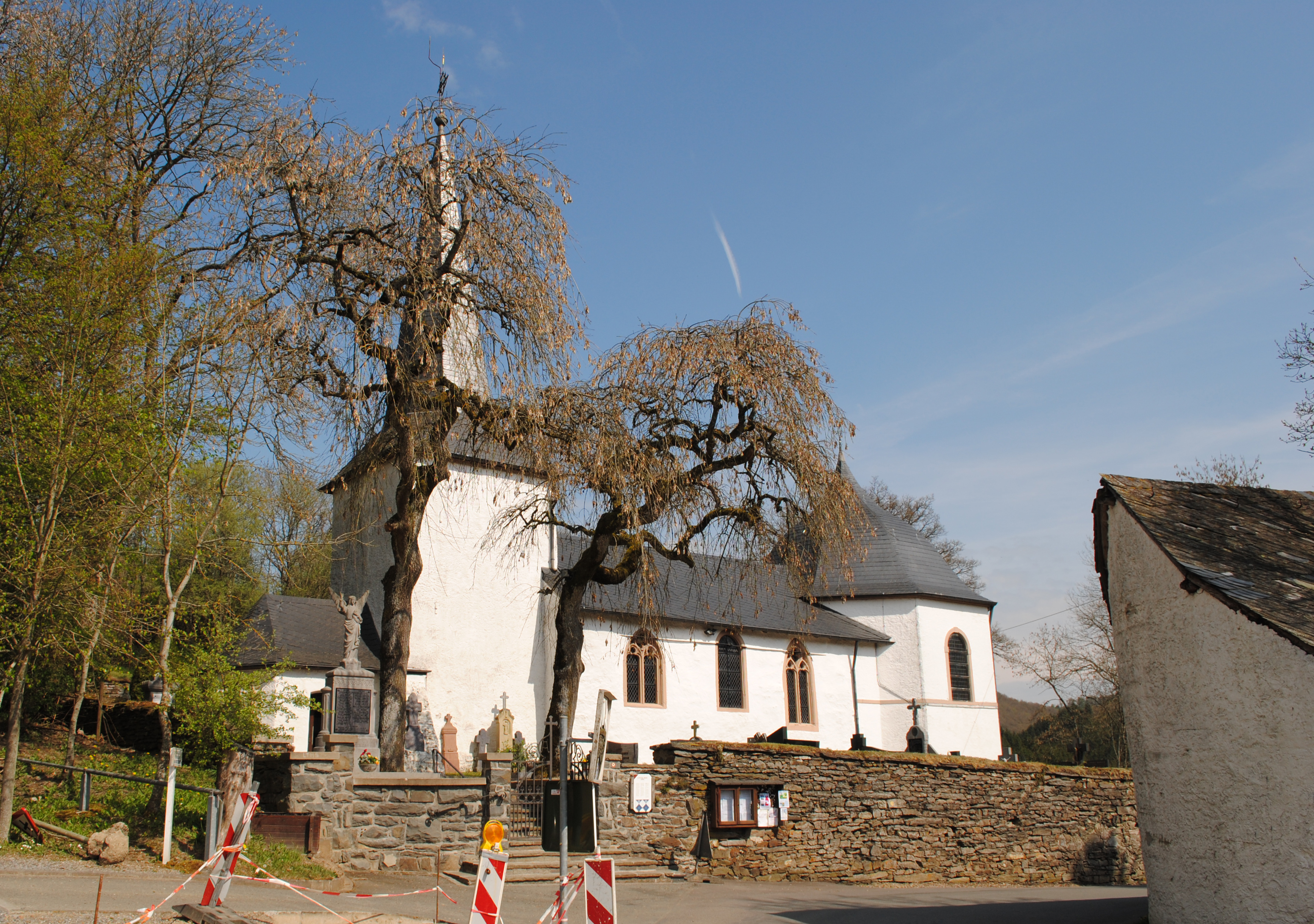
Church of St. Peter and Paul.

The Church of St Peter and Paul was founded approximately during the 12th century. The tower and the nave date back to that period. In 1741 the ruinous choir was renovated, and in 1921 a vestry was added. The church is a listed building, as is the Way of the Cross, which was created in 1896.

=== Rittersprung ===
The ′Rittersprung′ is a rock on the Northern entrance to the village Ouren-Peterskirchen. According to the legend a knight fell in the river Our with his mistress in order to escape his persecutors.

The legend tells of a robber baron who fell in love with the wife of the Lord of Ouren. Thus, he made a ploy to abduct the noble lady. After a nightly meeting on the foot of the castle he escaped with his mistress. Previously, he had shodden his horse but with the horse shoes on back to front. On this way, he wanted to delude the persecutors. However, the new horseshoes made such noise on the rocky surface that the couple was heard by its persecutors. The couple was confronted by its persecutors on a cliff that cut short steeply to the River Our and hence were trapped. In order to escape from captivity, the robber baron actuated his horse that jumped exceedingly from the cliff. The lovers fell into the river – nevertheless they survived – only the horse broke its legs. In return for the wondrous rescue the knight swore to found a chapel. However, as he did not fulfil his solemn promise he was hit by lightning.

=== Castle ruins ===
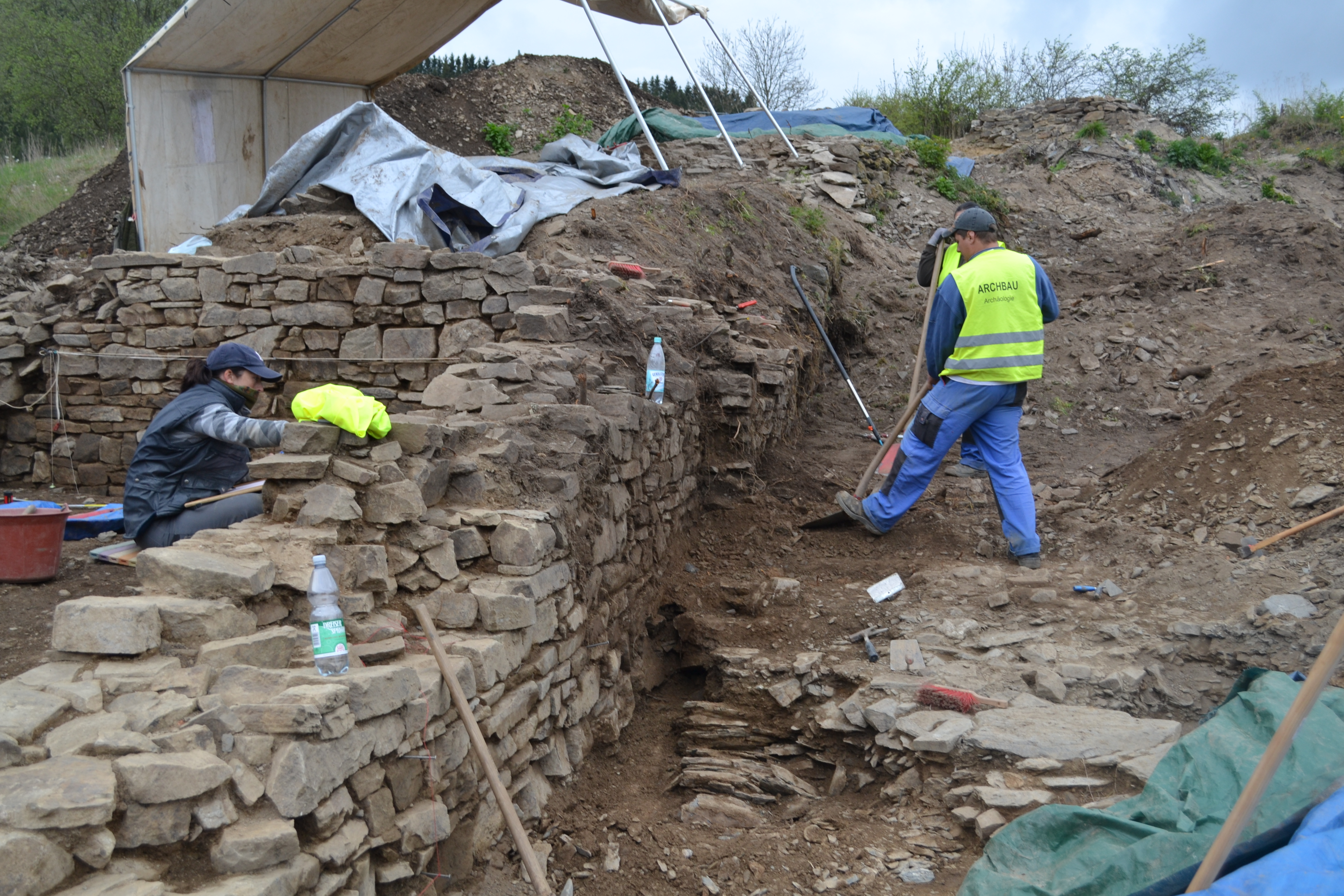
Excavation of the Archaeological Department of the German-speaking community on the castle hill of Ouren in spring 2014.

The castle ruins is situated on an off-set within the centre of the village on the left side of the river Our. Ouren Castle was the ancestral seat of the free nobles of Ouren. Dating back to the 11th century, the site was originally a segmented, fortified castle fortress with a palas, a bergfried, a chapel as well as an outer bailey.

Between 1535 and 1615, periods of modification mark changes to the residence of the nobility. A re-drawing in the lost watercolour by Joseph-Ernest Buschmann (1814-1853) from the mid 19th century depicts the site as – a probably romanticized – Baroque castle. In 1794 the castle was destroyed by French revolutionary troops and nearly fully demolished after 1845.

Today the castle ruin is considered being an archaeological site. Only single remains of the foundation and parts of the former enclosing walls are visible on the surface. Since 2012 the Archaeological Department of the German-speaking community of Belgium has been conducting excavations on the castle hill.
