= Holzthum =

Coordinates: 49°59′N 6°04′E

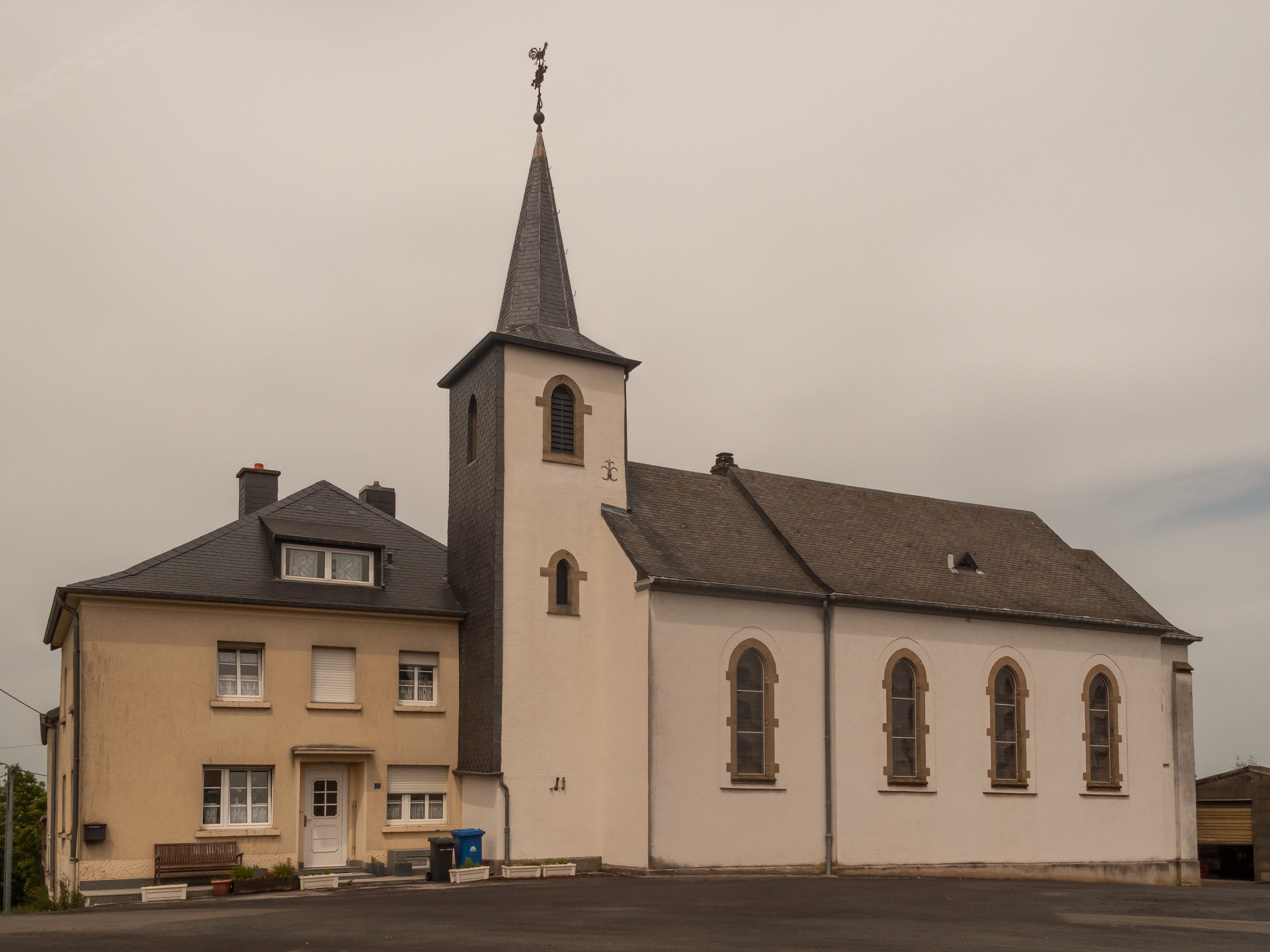
The church

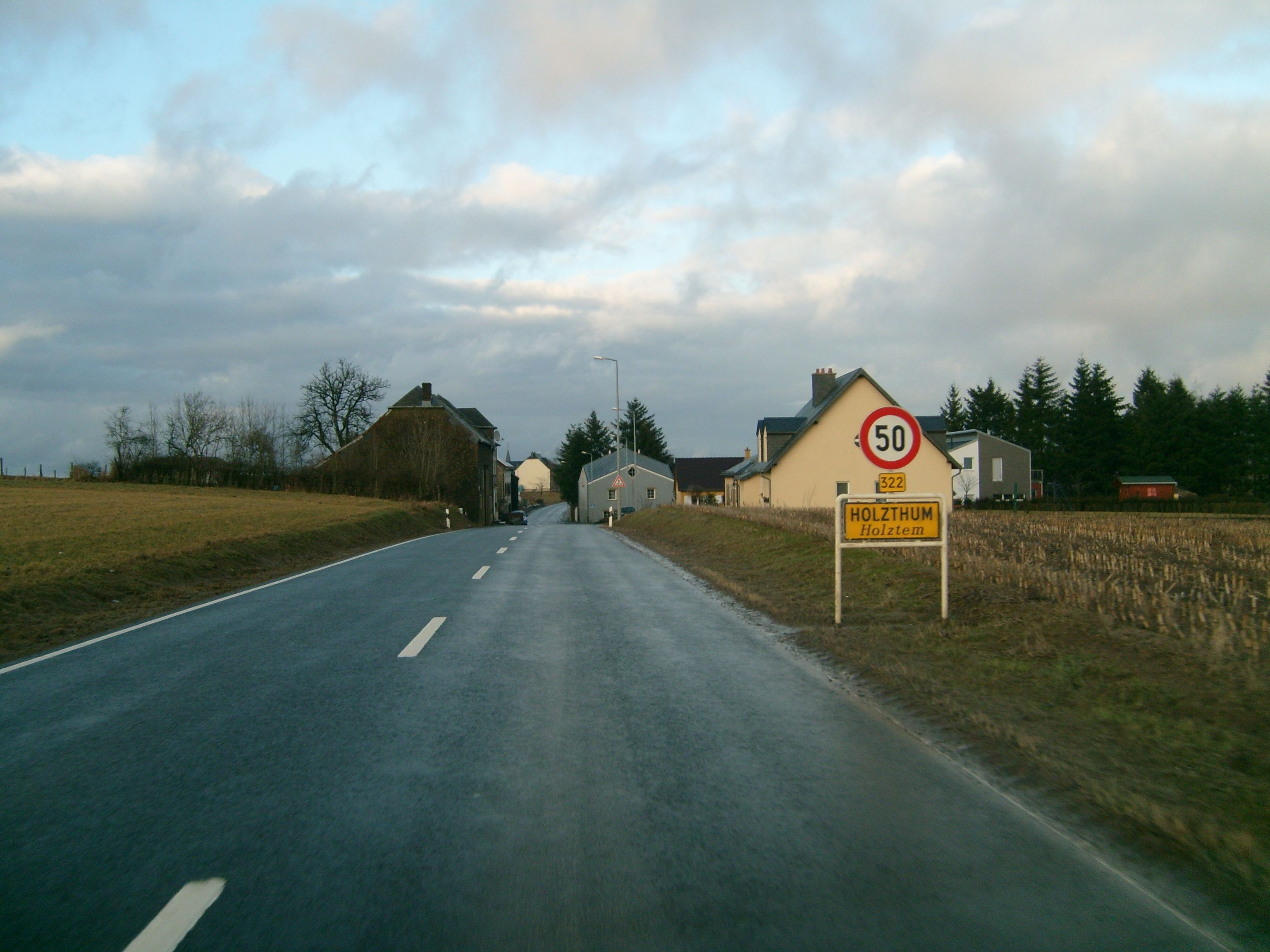
The village

Holzthum (Luxembourgish: Holztem) is a village in the commune of Parc Hosingen, in northern Luxembourg. As of September 2026, the village has a population of 338.

The town was once the site of a Late Roman Burgus, which was discovered in 2019 thanks to metal detectorists which yielded treasure trove of Roman solidii at its ruins.
