= Consthum =

Consthum Konstem
- Former commune of Luxembourg
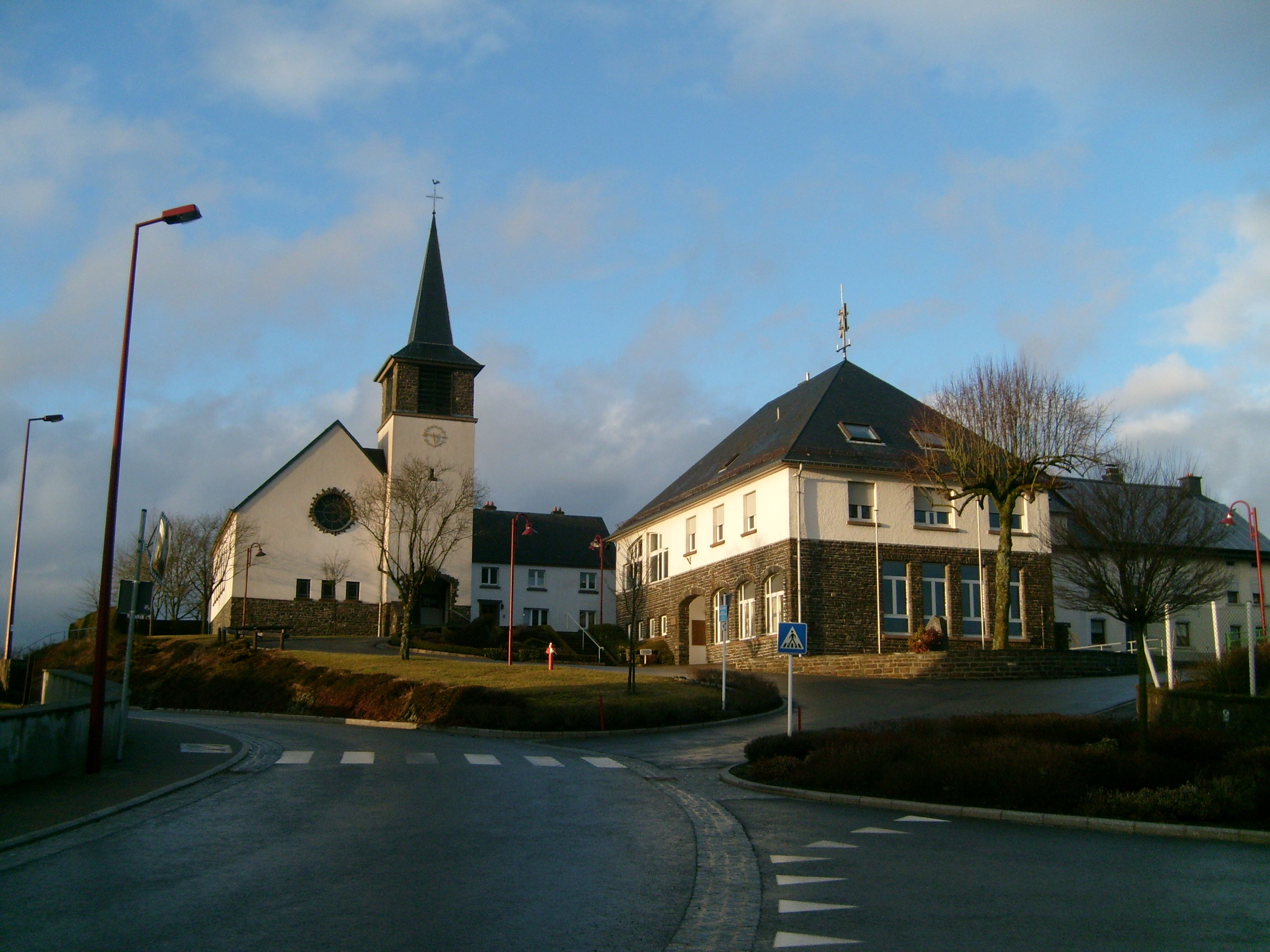
- The church and the old communal house
- Interactive map of Consthum
- Country: Luxembourg
- District: Diekirch
- Canton: Clervaux
- Created: Original commune
- Abolished: 1 January 2012
- Currently: Part of Parc Hosingen

Consthum (Luxembourgish: Konstem) is a village and a former commune in northern Luxembourg, in the canton of Clervaux.

On 1 January 2012, the commune merged with Hoscheid and Hosingen communes to form the commune of Parc Hosingen.

As of September 2026, the village had a population of 311.

== Former commune ==
The former commune consisted of the villages:

- Consthum
- Holzthum
- Geyershof (lieu-dit)
