= Vianden Pumped Storage Plant =

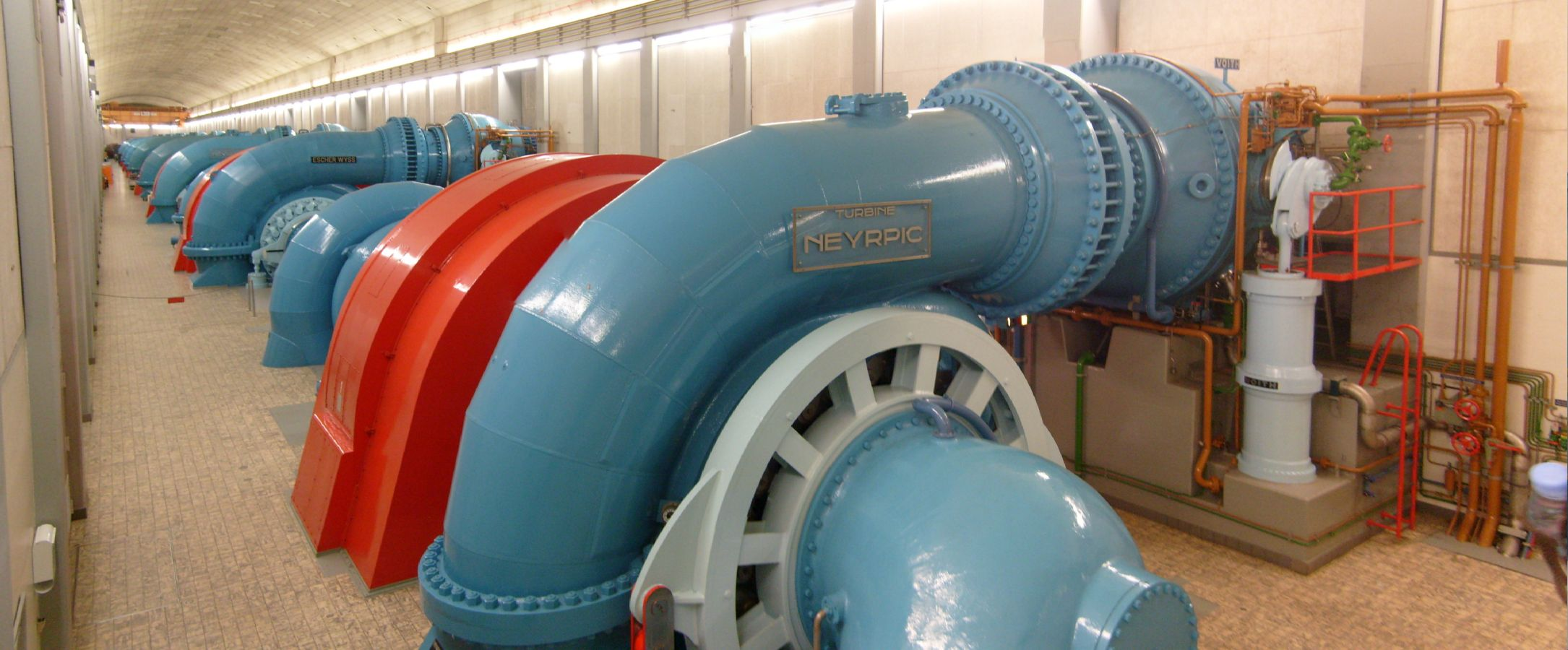
- The plant's main pump-generator cavern
- Interactive map of Vianden Pumped Storage Plant
- Official name: PSW Vianden (Pumpspeicherkraftwerk Vianden)
- Country: Luxembourg
- Location: Vianden
- Coordinates: 49°57′08″N 6°10′38″E
- Status: Operational
- Construction began: 1959
- Opening date: 1962-64/1976
- Owner: Société électrique de l'Our (SEO)/RWE
- Operator: SEO

Upper reservoir
- Creates: Vianden Upper I & II
- Total capacity: 10,800,000 m^{3} (8,800 acre⋅ft)

Lower reservoir
- Creates: Vianden Lower
- Total capacity: 7,230,000 m^{3} (5,860 acre⋅ft)

Power Station
- Hydraulic head: 291 m (955 ft) (max)
- Pump-generators: 9 x 100 MW (130,000 hp), 1 x 196 MW (263,000 hp) Francis pump-turbine
- Pumps: 9 x 70 MW (94,000 hp), 1 x 220 MW (300,000 hp)
- Installed capacity: 220 MW (300,000 hp)
- Annual generation: 1,650 GWh (5,900 TJ)

The Vianden Pumped Storage Plant is located just north of Vianden, in north-eastern Luxembourg. The power plant uses the pumped-storage hydroelectric method to generate electricity and serves as a peaking power plant. Its lower reservoir is located on the Our River, bordering Germany, and the upper is elevated above on the nearby Saint Nicholas Mountain. Construction on the plant began in 1959 and the first pump-generators were commissioned in 1962. A tenth pump-generator was installed in 1976 bringing the plant's installed generating capacity to 1,096 megawatts (1,470,000 hp). The plant generates an average of 1,650 gigawatt-hours (5,900 TJ) annually but of course consumes even more. Generally the efficiency of this energy storage method is around 70–80%. The plant is owned by Société électrique de l'Our and RWE. Construction on an eleventh pump-generator began in 2010 and it is expected to be commissioned in 2013, which will bring the plant's installed capacity to 1,296 megawatts (1,738,000 hp).

== Background ==
Planning for the project began in 1925 but the idea failed due to a lack of funding and political pressure. On 10 July 1958, a treaty was signed between Luxembourg and the German state of Rhineland-Palatinate, which also shares the Our River, allowing construction. Construction began in August 1959. The first four pump-generators were commissioned in the winter of 1962/63 and five through nine in 1964. The official inauguration of the plant was held on 17 April 1964 in the presence of Grand Duchess Charlotte and prime minister Pierre Werner; it was the largest pumped storage plant in the world at that time. Construction on a tenth pump-generator began in 1970 and was operational in late 1976. It required the expansion of the upper reservoir, known as Upper Reservoir II.

=== Second expansion ===
Planning for a 200 megawatts (270,000 hp) eleventh unit began in 2006 and the designs were completed in 2009 by Lahmeyer International. Construction on the unit began in January 2010. To accommodate the new unit, the capacities of both the upper and lower reservoirs are being increased by 500,000 m^{3} (410 acre⋅ft). To accomplish this, the upper reservoir wall will be raised 100 centimetres (39 in) and the lower Vianden Dam raised 50 centimetres (20 in). Additionally, a new cavern and set of tunnels just east of the main power cavern will be constructed to house the turbine-generator and penstock. Excavation of these tunnels and caverns was completed on 31 May 2011. On 15 June 2010, Upper Reservoir I was drained to install a new intake structure, which was completed in November 2010. Construction on the new suction/discharge pipe began on 16 May 2011. A cofferdam was constructed around the site in the lower reservoir. The entire expansion is expected to be complete in late 2013.

== Design and operation ==
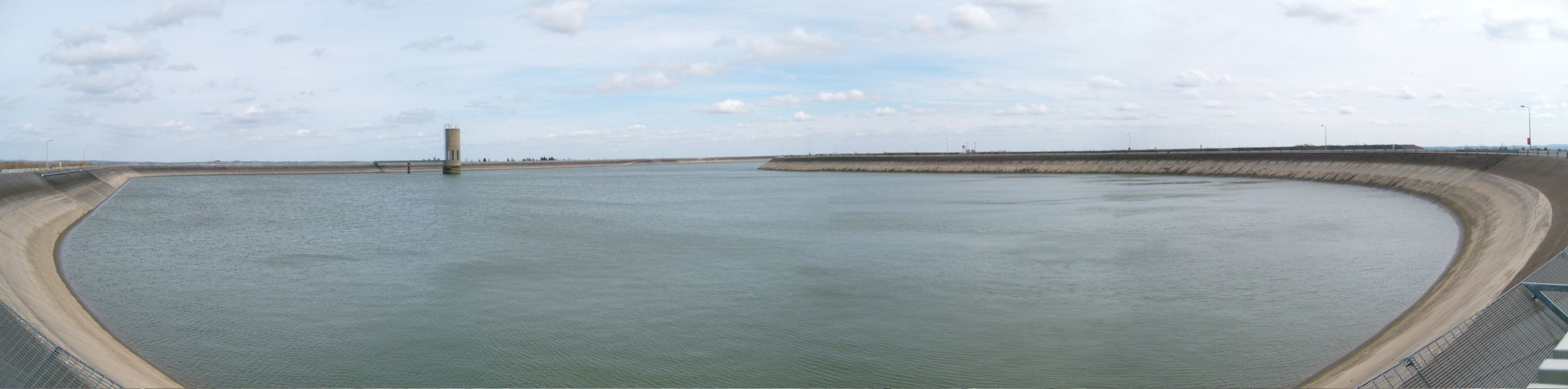
Upper Reservoir I

The power plant consists of two reservoirs (upper and lower), two power stations and appurtenant structures such as tunnels, intakes and transformers. The upper reservoir for the plant is separated into two sections, I & II. It is formed by a continuous dam and both sections are divided by a dam with floodgates. The total storage capacity of the upper reservoir (both I & II) is 7,230,000 cubic metres (5,860 acre⋅ft). The active (or usable) capacity of the upper reservoir is 6,840,000 cubic metres (5,550 acre⋅ft). Upper Reservoir I itself has as active capacity of 3,010,000 cubic metres (2,440 acre⋅ft) and Upper Reservoir II: 3,830,000 cubic metres (3,110 acre⋅ft). To supply water to the generators and to serve as a discharge for the pumps, both Upper Reservoirs I & II have combined intakes/outlets. Upper Reservoir I primarily supplies the main powerhouse (900 megawatts (1,200,000 hp)) with water and Upper Reservoir II supplies a secondary powerhouse (196 megawatts (263,000 hp)) with water although both reservoirs are at the same altitude and can balance one another.

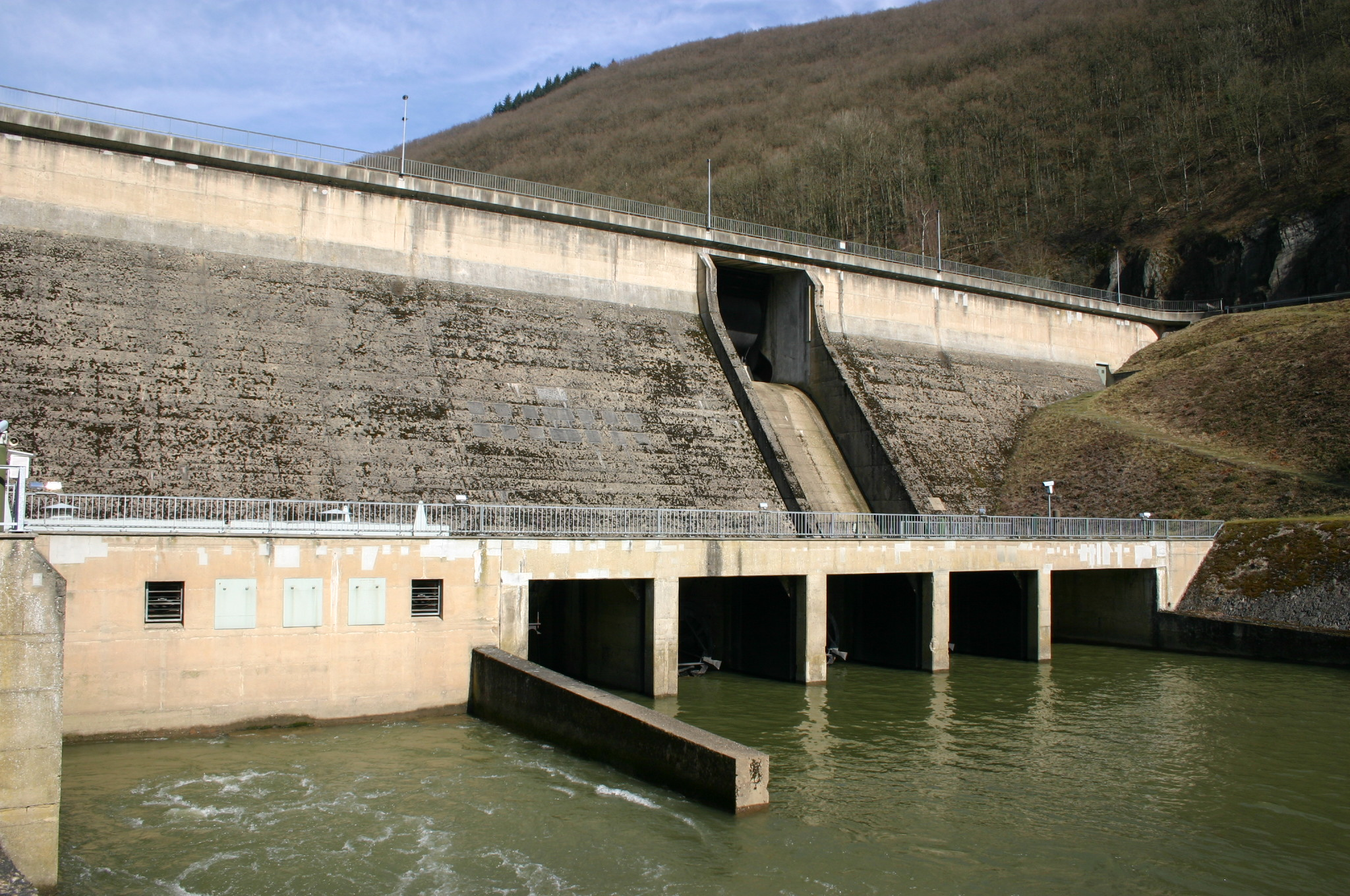
The lower reservoir dam, Vianden Dam

Water from Upper Reservoir I is sent to the main power house, which contains nine Francis pump-turbine-generators, via a system of tunnels and penstocks. When generating power, each generator has an installed capacity of 100 megawatts (130,000 hp) and when pumping the capacity is 70 megawatts (94,000 hp). Each of the nine pump-generators can discharge 39.5 cubic metres per second (1,390 cu ft/s) of water when generating electricity and can pump 21 cubic metres per second (740 cu ft/s) back to the upper reservoir when in pumping mode. Upper Reservoir II's intake/outlet sends water down to the secondary powerhouse which contains one Francis turbine-pump-generator. When generating electricity, the pump-generator has an installed capacity of 196 MW and when pumping the capacity is 220 megawatts (300,000 hp). This pump-generator can discharge 77 cubic metres per second (2,700 cu ft/s) of water and can pump 74 cubic metres per second (2,600 cu ft/s). After electricity is generated, both power stations discharge water into the lower reservoir which is created on the Our River by the 30 metres (98 ft) tall and 130 metres (430 ft) long gravity dam, Vianden Dam. The lower reservoir has a gross storage capacity of 10,080,000 cubic metres (8,170 acre⋅ft) of which 6,840,000 cubic metres (5,550 acre⋅ft) of water is active (or usable for pumping to the upper reservoir). The lower reservoir is at an elevation of 227.5 metres (746 ft) while the upper reservoir is situated at 510.4 metres (1,675 ft). The difference in elevation between the reservoirs affords a maximum hydraulic head of 291.3 metres (956 ft) and minimum of 266.5 metres (874 ft).

Water is pumped from the lower reservoir to the upper during periods of low demand, usually during the night for a period of eight hours. When energy demand is high, water from the upper reservoir is used to generate power and meet peak energy demand. The process repeats daily or as needed. During pumping and generating about 5,500,000 m^{3} (4,459 acre⋅ft) is oscillated between both reservoirs. When the 200 MW expansion is completed, the size of both the upper and lower reservoirs will be expanded and the installed generating capacity of the power plant will increase from 1,096 MW to 1,296 MW.

== See also ==
- List of pumped-storage hydroelectric power stations
- Esch-sur-Sûre Dam
