= Our (river) =

River in Belgium, Germany and Luxembourg

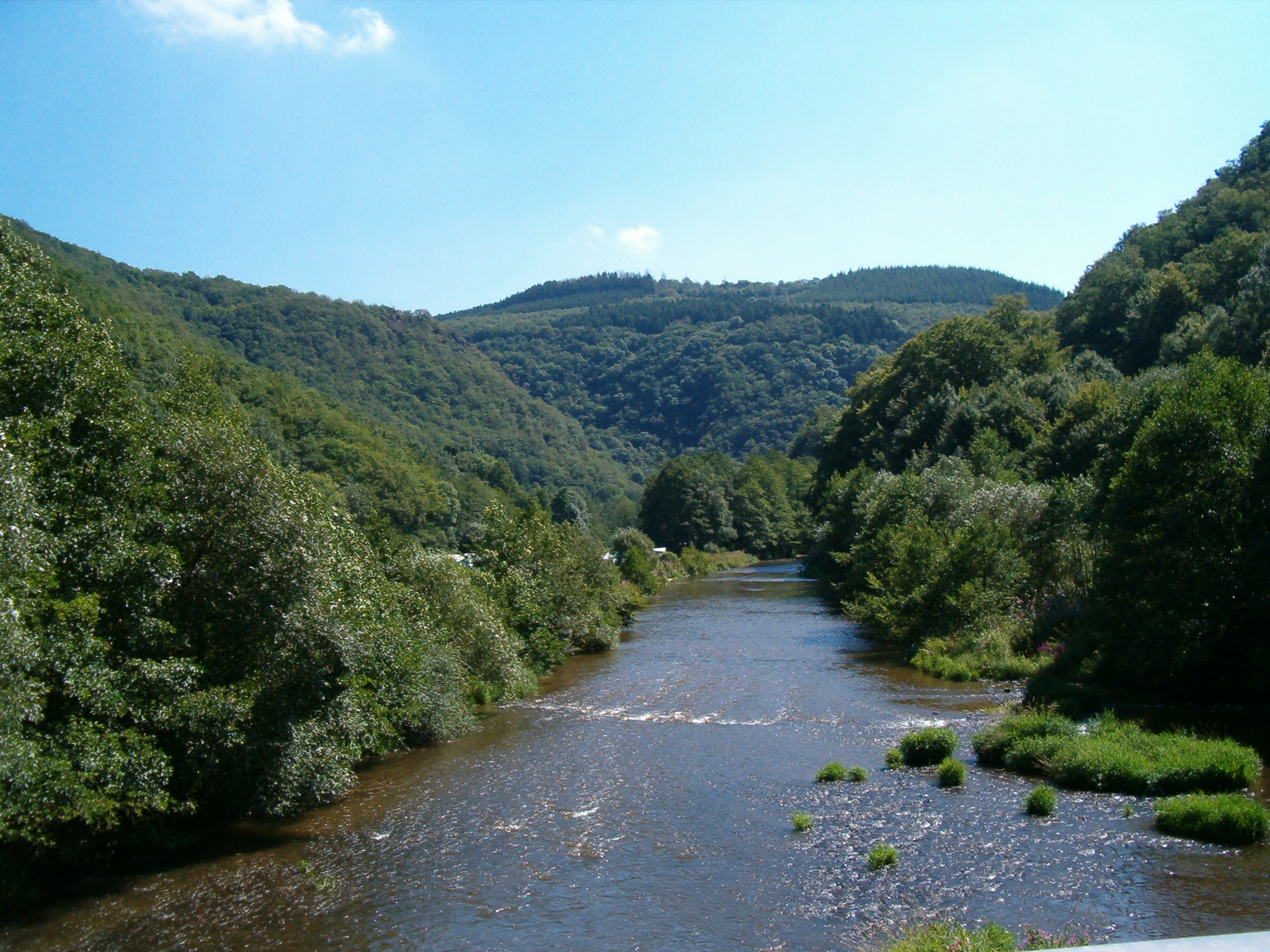
- The Our flowing through the Ardennes in Luxembourg

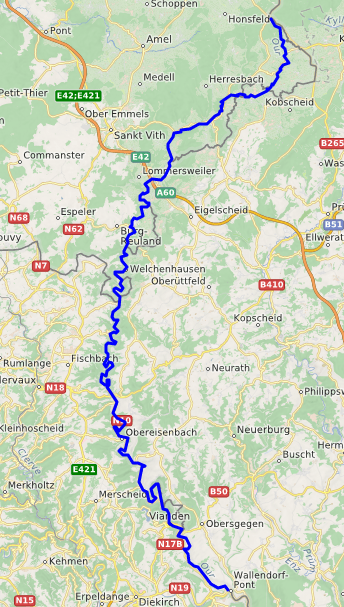
- Course of the Our

Location
- Countries: Belgium; Luxembourg; Germany
- Reference no.: DE: 2626

Physical characteristics
- Source
  - location: Northeast of the Eichelsberg in the municipality of Büllingen, parish of Manderfeld
  - coordinates: 50°22′38″N 6°20′45″E
  - elevation: ca. 643 m
- Mouth
  - location: Near Wallendorf into the Sauer
  - coordinates: 49°52′30″N 6°17′12″E
  - elevation: ca. 177 m above sea level (NHN)
- Length: 96.111 km (59.721 mi)
- Basin size: 668.334 km^{2} (258.045 sq mi)
- Discharge
  - location: at Gemünd Our gauge
  - average: 9.38 m^{3}/s (331 cu ft/s)
  - minimum: Record low: 50 L/s (1.8 cu ft/s) (5 July 1976); Average low: 545 L/s (19.2 cu ft/s)
  - maximum: Average high: 118 m^{3}/s (4,200 cu ft/s); Record high: 236 m^{3}/s (8,300 cu ft/s) (22 December 1991)

Basin features
- Progression: Sauer→ Moselle→ Rhine→ North Sea

Our (Luxembourgish: [ˈuːɐ̯]; French: [uʁ], German: [ˈuːɐ̯]) is a river in Belgium, Luxembourg and Germany. It is a left-hand tributary of the Sauer/Sûre. Its length is 96 kilometres (60 mi), and it drains a basin of 668 km^{2} (258 sq mi).

The source lies in the High Fens in southeastern Belgium, near Manderfeld. The river flows southwards along the German–Belgian border, then from Ouren onward along the German–Luxembourg border. The historic town of Vianden lies on the Our. It empties into the Sauer near Wallendorf.

== Course ==
The river rises in the eastern Ardennes and western Eifel on Belgian soil. Its source near Losheimergraben lies northeast of the Eichelsberg mountain (653 m) at 643 m, near the B 265. Just a few hundred metres away is the source of the River Kyll. The Our initially follows the B 265, also the Belgian–German border. From the tripoint by the Europa Monument between Ouren (Belgium), Sevenig (Germany), and Lieler (Luxembourg), it runs almost entirely on the German–Luxembourg border until Wallendorf. It generally meanders from north to south.

For the section along the German–Luxembourg border, the Our is a jointly managed condominium (the "Joint German–Luxembourg Sovereign Area"). Unilateral sovereignty begins only at the respective shore. In the upper reaches between Germany and Belgium, the border lies on the thalweg.

== Tributaries ==
– Location of confluences measured from source –

- Ihrenbach (left, at km 21, length 15.9 km)
- Braunlauf (right, at km 23, length 15.4 km)
- Ulf (right, near km 30, length 17.8 km)
- Irsen (left, near km 67, length 35.5 km)

A comprehensive list including smaller tributaries is at the German Wikipedia.

== Villages on the Our ==
The town of Vianden, one of the main tourist destinations in Luxembourg, lies on the Our. The Our Valley Route is a circular touring route through Belgium and northern Luxembourg.

Other villages include:

- Roth an der Our
- Ouren
- Sevenig
- Dahnen
- Dasburg
- Rodershausen
- Untereisenbach
- Stolzembourg
- Bettel
- Gentingen
- Ammeldingen an der Our
- Schönberg
- Wallendorf
- Grüfflingen (near St. Vith)
- Auel

== Usage ==
The Our is impounded north of Vianden by the Our Dam, forming the lower basin of the Vianden Pumped Storage Plant.

== Gallery ==
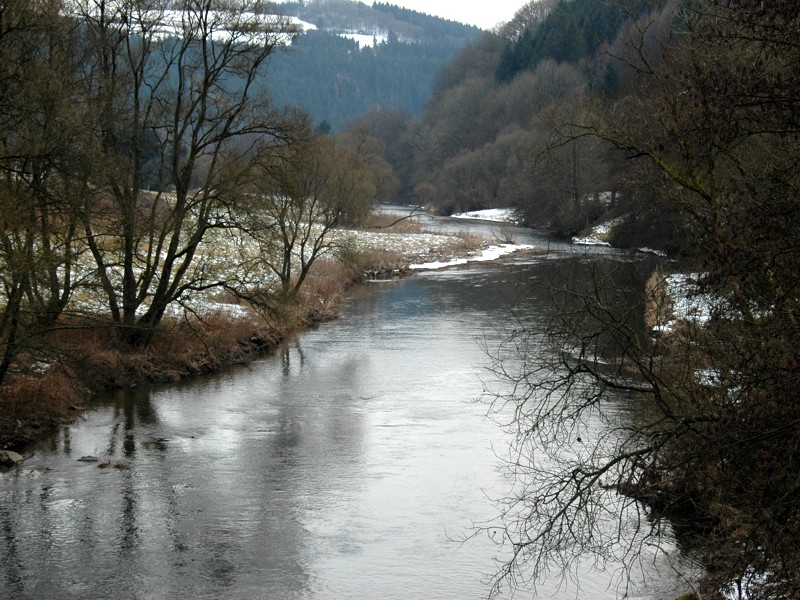
The Our near Dasburg-Pont. Left: Germany, right: Luxembourg.

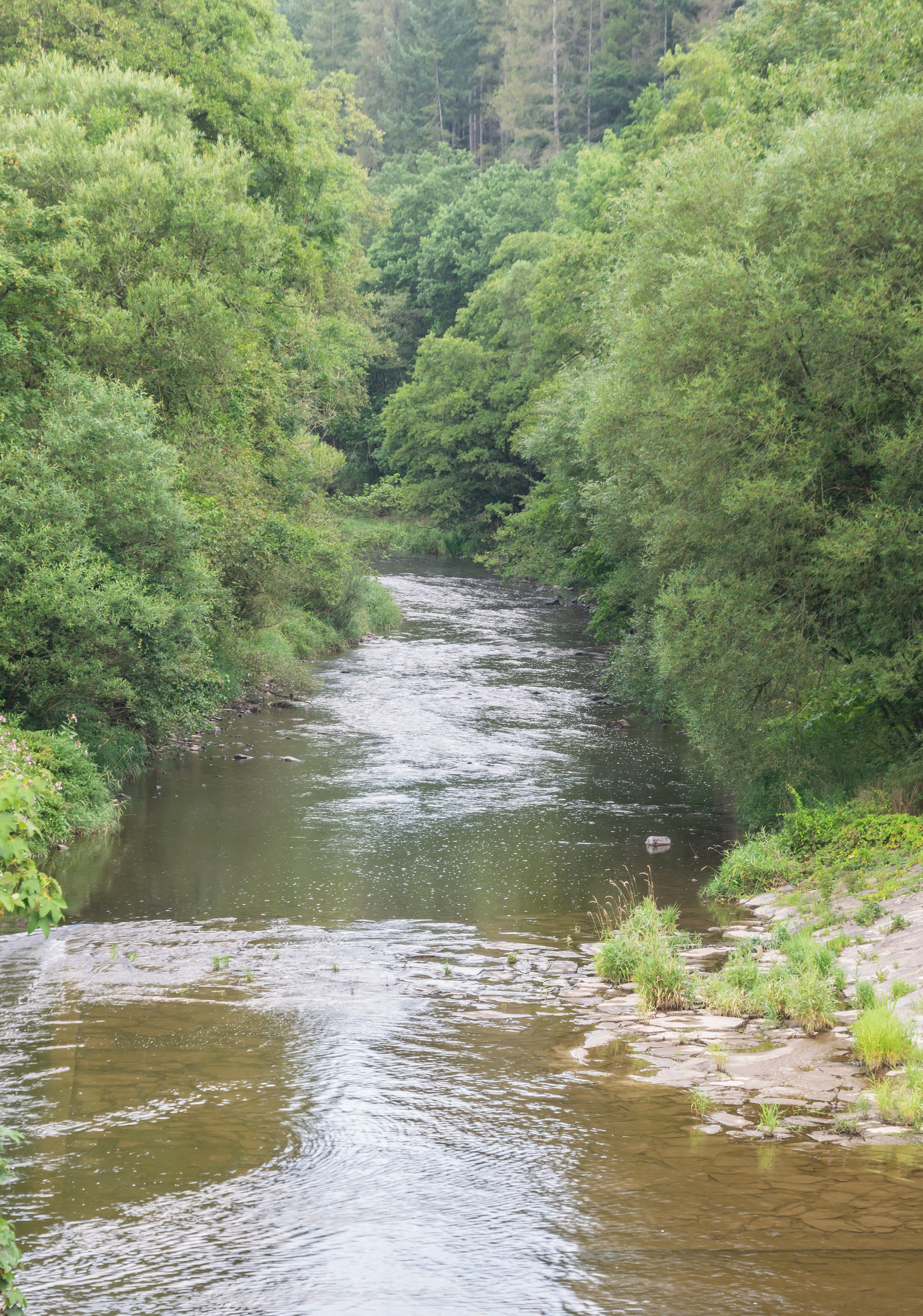
The Our near Dasburg

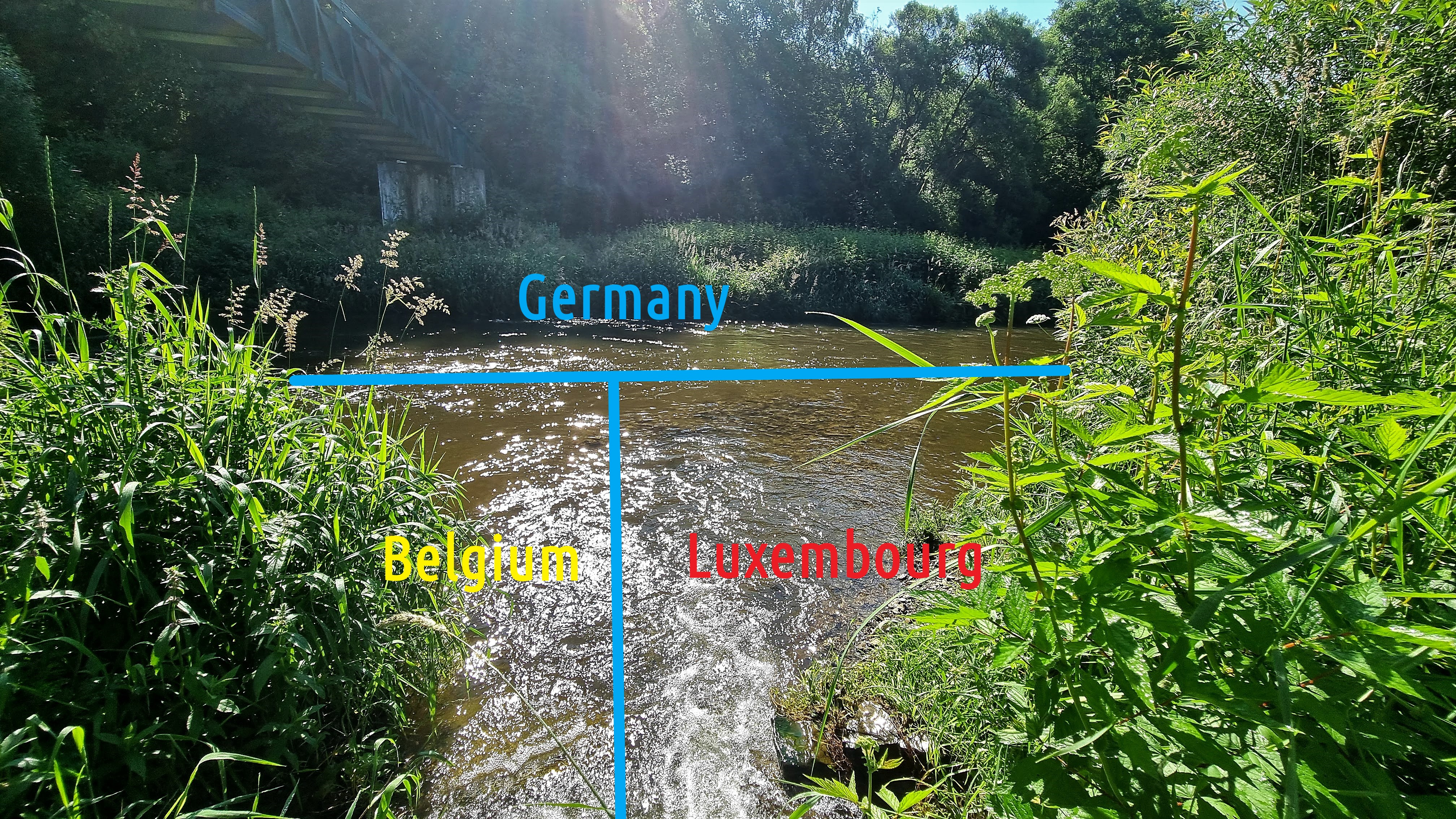
The tripoint between Belgium, Germany and Luxembourg at the Our

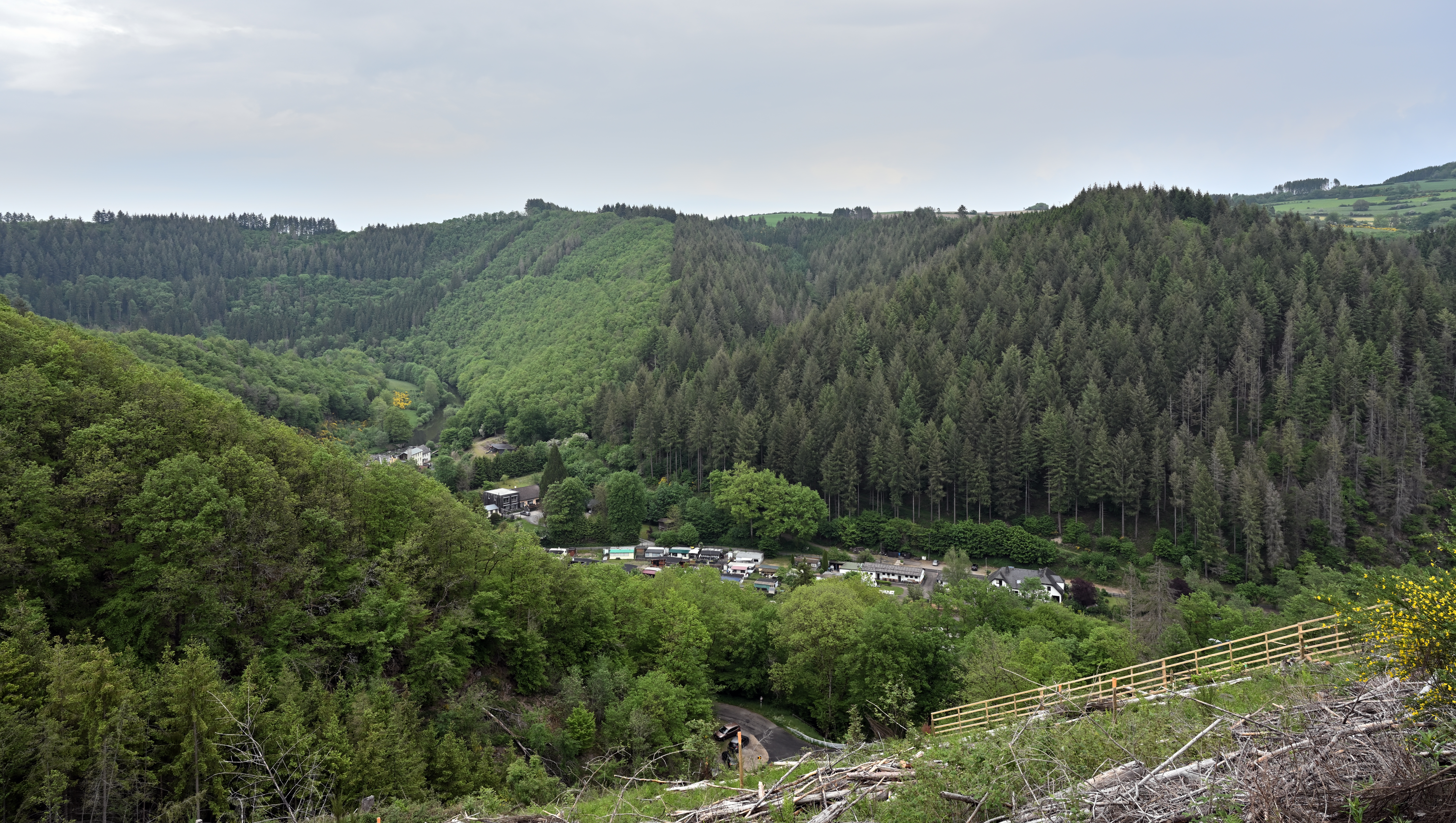
The Our valley northwest of Dasburg-Pont

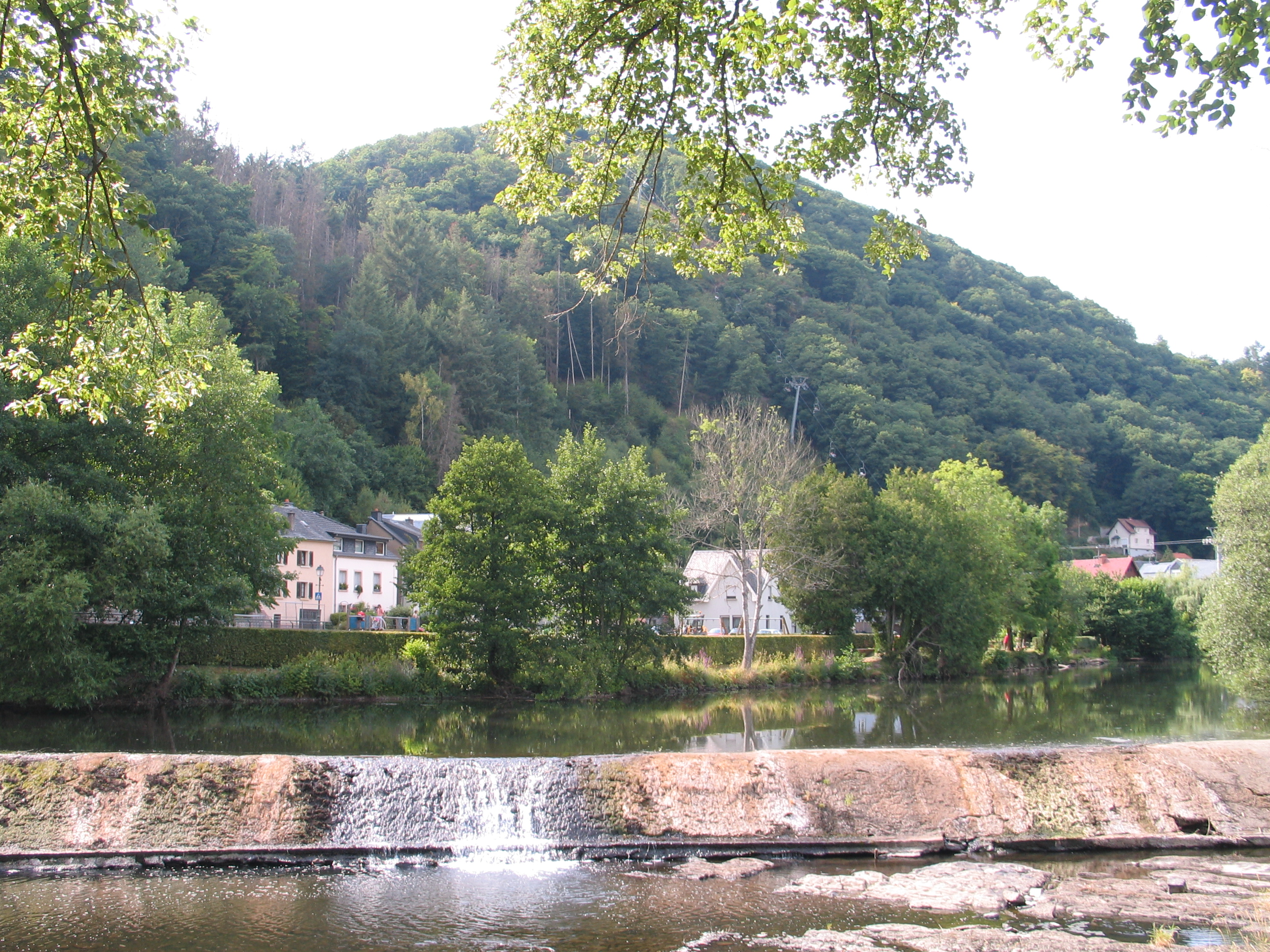
The Our in Vianden

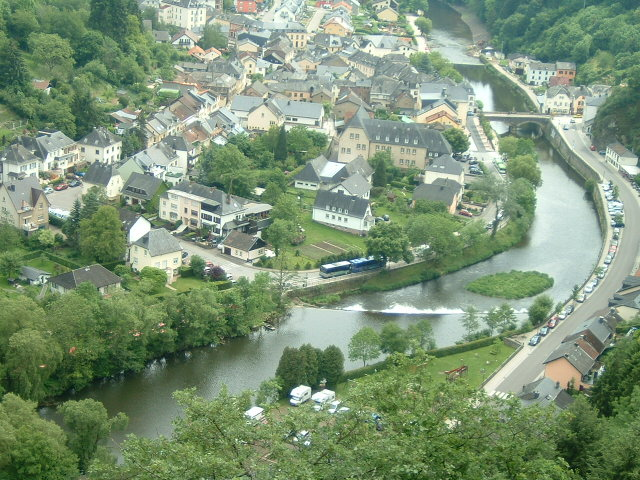
The Our near Vianden

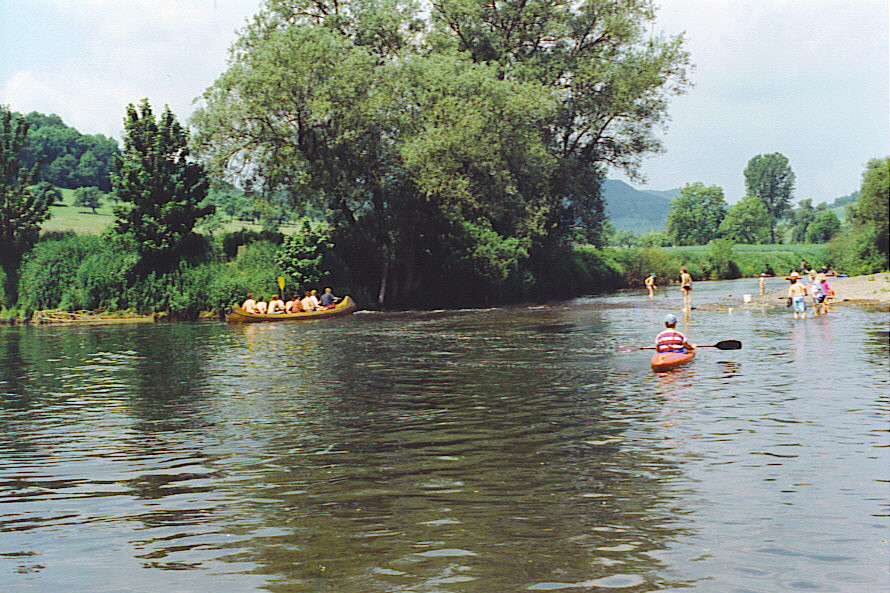
Confluence with the Sauer

== See also ==
- Our Natural Park
- List of rivers of Belgium
- List of rivers of Luxembourg
- List of rivers of Rhineland-Palatinate
