= Hoscheid =

Hoscheid Houschent
- Former commune
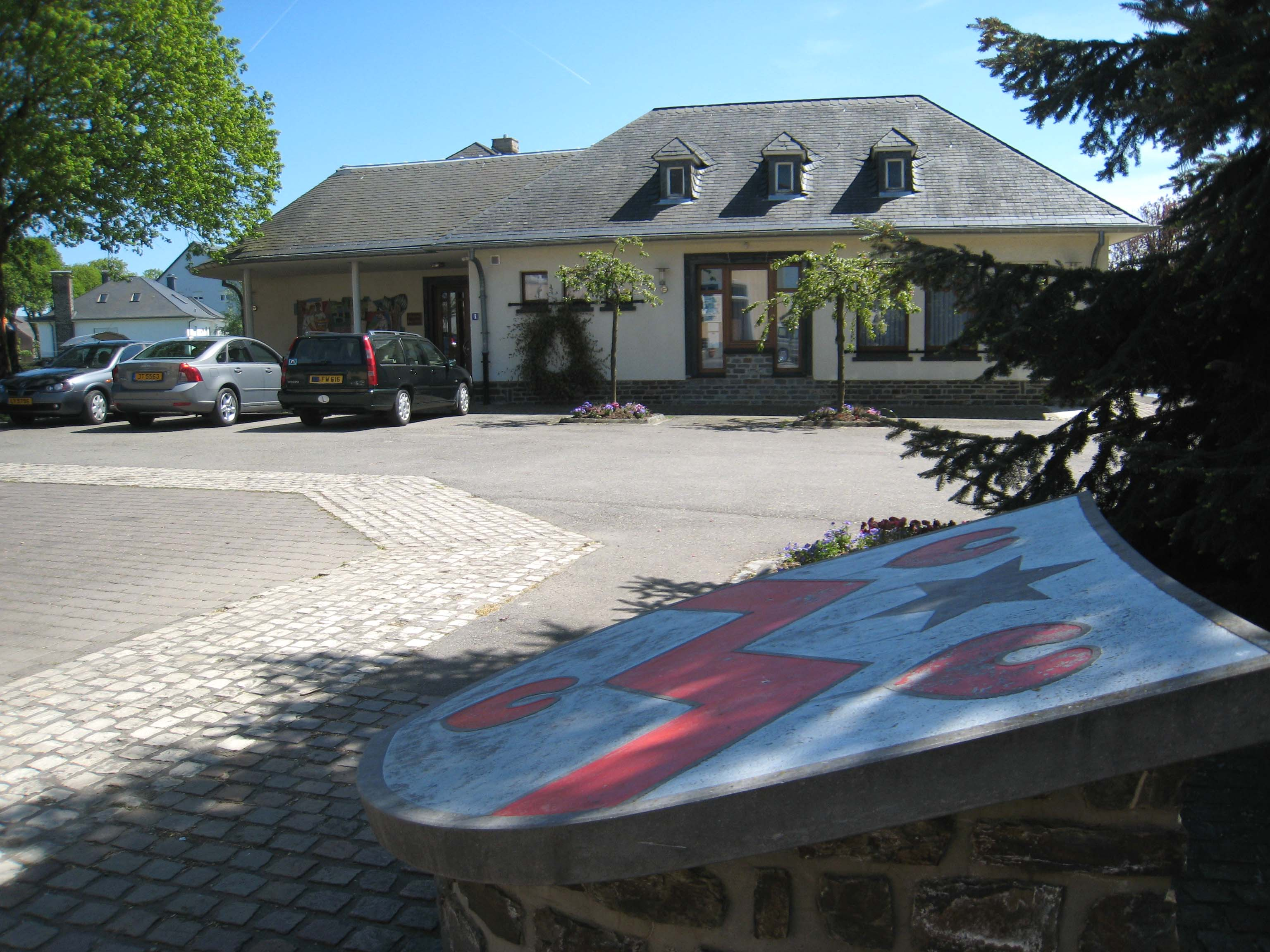
- The town hall

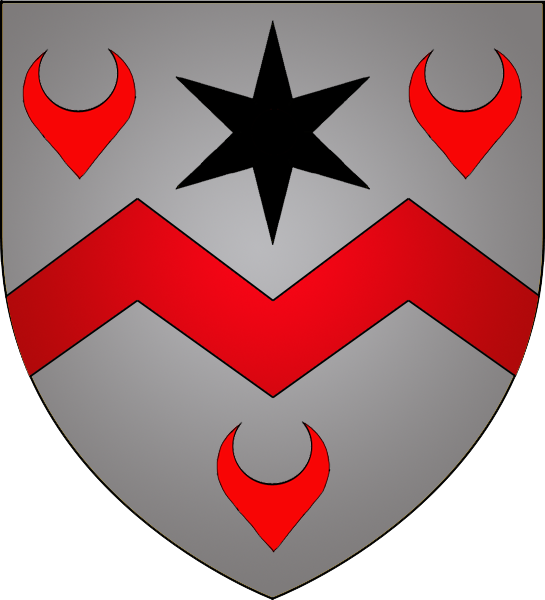
- Coat of arms

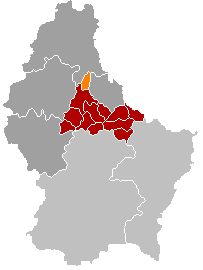
- Map of Luxembourg with Hoscheid highlighted in orange, and the canton in dark red
- Coordinates: 49.9472°N 6.0806°E
- Country: Luxembourg
- Canton: Clervaux
- Time zone: UTC+1 (CET)
  - Summer (DST): UTC+2 (CEST)
- Website: hoscheid.lu

Hoscheid (German pronunciation: [ˈhoːʃaɪt]; Luxembourgish: Houschent) is a small town in north-eastern Luxembourg. It was a commune, part of the canton of Diekirch, which was part of the district of Diekirch.

On January 1, 2012, the commune merged with Consthum and Hosingen communes to form the commune of Parc Hosingen; thereby becoming part of the canton of Clervaux.

As of September 2026, the town had a population of 588.

Among local personalities is Jean Ersfeld, who, in 2004, led his party, the Free Party of Luxembourg in the legislative elections.

== Former commune ==
The former commune consisted of the villages:

- Houscheid
- Houscheid-Dickt
- Oberschlinder
- Unterschlinder
- Markebach (lieu-dit)
- Kehrmuhle (lieu-dit)
- Schilkeschleedchen where a firing range of the Luxembourg Armed Forces is located
