= Parc Hosingen =

Parc Hosingen Parc Housen (Luxembourgish)
- Commune
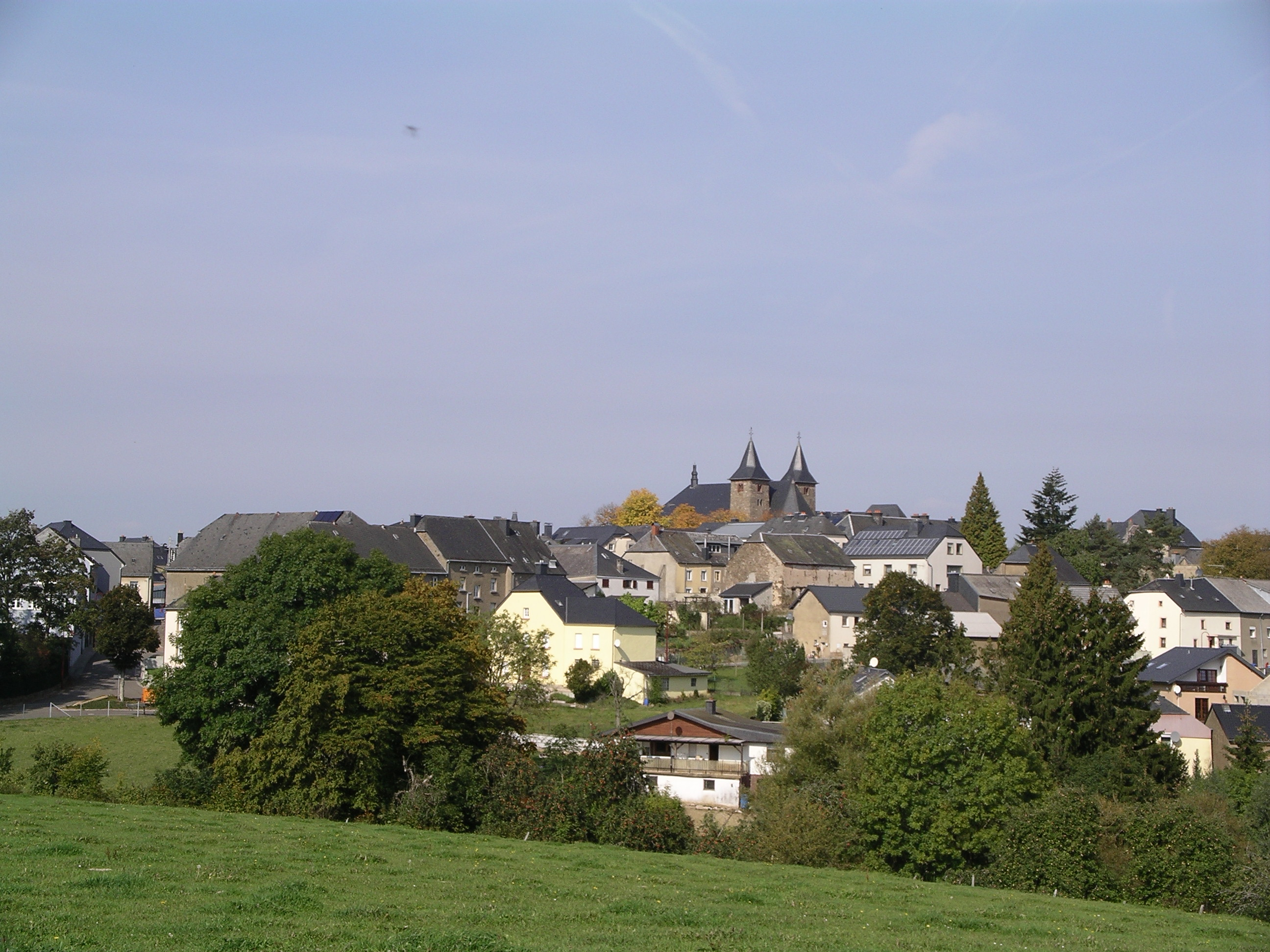

- Map of Luxembourg with Parc Hosingen highlighted in orange, and the canton in dark red
- Coordinates: 50.014708°N 6.091286°E
- Country: Luxembourg
- Canton: Clervaux

Government
  - Mayor: Romain Wester

Area
  - Total: 70.65 km^{2} (27.28 sq mi)
  - Rank: 4th of 100
- Highest elevation: 535 m (1,755 ft)
  - Rank: 9th of 100
- Lowest elevation: 227 m (745 ft)
  - Rank: 40th of 100

Population (2025)
  - Total: 4,305
  - Rank: 49th of 100
  - Density: 60.93/km^{2} (157.8/sq mi)
  - Rank: 89th of 100
- Time zone: UTC+1 (CET)
  - Summer (DST): UTC+2 (CEST)
- LAU 2: LU0000503
- Website: www.hosingen.lu

Parc Hosingen (Luxembourgish: Parc Housen) is a commune in northern Luxembourg, in the canton of Clervaux. It lies on the border with Germany.

The commune of Parc Hosingen was formed on 1 January 2012 from the former communes of Consthum, Hosingen and Hoscheid (the latter formerly part of the canton of Diekirch). The law creating Parc Hosingen was passed on 24 May 2011.

== Populated places ==
The commune consists of the following villages:

Consthum Section:

- Consthum
- Holzthum
- Geyershof (lieu-dit)

Hoscheid Section:

- Hoscheid
- Hoscheid-Dickt
- Oberschlinder
- Unterschlinder
- Markebach (lieu-dit)
- Kehrmuhle (lieu-dit)

Hosingen Section:

- Bockholtz
- Dorscheid
- Hosingen
- Neidhausen
- Obereisenbach
- Rodershausen
- Untereisenbach
- Wahlhausen
- Ackerscheid (lieu-dit)
- Dickt (lieu-dit)
- Dasbourg-Pont (lieu-dit)
- Duerschterhaischen (lieu-dit)
- Fennbierg (lieu-dit)
- Honich (lieu-dit)
- Housenerbarrière (lieu-dit)
- Kohnenhaff (lieu-dit)
- Schmitzdell (lieu-dit)
- Veianenerstross (lieu-dit)
- Waldberg (lieu-dit)
- Wegscheid (lieu-dit)

== Population ==
Historical population

Year	Pop.	±%
1821	2,436	—
1851	3,532	+45.0%
1900	3,024	−14.4%
1910	3,024	+0.0%
1922	2,815	−6.9%
1935	2,585	−8.2%

Year	Pop.	±%
1947	2,112	−18.3%
1960	1,864	−11.7%
1970	1,685	−9.6%
1981	1,673	−0.7%
1990	1,774	+6.0%
2000	2,194	+23.7%

Year	Pop.	±%
2005	2,566	+17.0%
2010	2,929	+14.1%
2015	3,297	+12.6%
2020	3,669	+11.3%
2021	3,732	+1.7%

Source data
