= Prüm Urbar =

Prümer Urbar, better known in English as the Polyptych or Polyptychon of Prüm, is a register of the properties (Urbarium) that belonged to the Benedictine Prüm Abbey in the Eifel in the year 893. In this document, the numerous possessions of the abbey were recorded.

The date of the original nomenclature's creation - written by Abbot Regino of Prüm - is not known. In 1222, Caesarius of Milendonk produced the only surviving copy of the Prüm Urbar, adding additional information and comments. This document stretches 57 pages and 118 chapters. The Prüm Urbar is currently held at the Landeshauptarchiv Koblenz.

Chapter	Designation in Urbar	Designation Today (Regional)	Remark
1	Rumersheym	Rommersheim	Bitburg-Prüm district
2	Wettellendorpht	Wetteldorf	Schönecken, Bitburg-Prüm district
3	Herlensdorpht	Hersdorf	Bitburg-Prüm district
4	Gundensdorpht	Giesdorf or Gondelsheim	Bitburg-Prüm district
5	Didendorpht	Dingdorf	Bitburg-Prüm district
6	Walmersheym	Wallersheim	Bitburg-Prüm district
7	Caldenburne	Kalenborn-Scheuern	Kalenborn-Scheuern, Vulkaneifel district
8	Sarensdorpt	Sarresdorf	Gerolstein, Vulkaneifel district
9	Birensburne	Birresborn	Vulkaneifel district
10	Ettellendorpht	Etteldorf	Bitburg-Prüm district
11	Badenheym	Badem	Bitburg-Prüm district
12	Vuerscleyte	Schleid	Bitburg-Prüm district
13	Sefferne	Seffern	Bitburg-Prüm district
14	Wihc ?	Sefferweich	Bitburg-Prüm district
15	Helinbugh, Hellenbuch	Heilenbach	Bitburg-Prüm district
16	alio Wihc ?	Sefferweich	Bitburg-Prüm district
17	tercio Wihc ?	Malbergweich	Bitburg-Prüm district
18	Houestede	Huscheid	Nimshuscheid, Bitburg-Prüm district
19	Wleysheym	Fließem	Bitburg-Prüm district
20	Nanzenheym	Nattenheim	Bitburg-Prüm district
21	Baldenshart et Denesbure ?	Balesfeld and Densborn	
22	item de Wihc (iuxta malberhc) ?	Malbergweich, Malberg	
23	Merxz et Trimparden ?	Mötsch, Trimport	
24	Merrinche	Mehring (Mosel)	
25	Sueyge	Schweich	
26	Vurne	Föhren	
27	Salmene	Hetzerath	Bernkastel-Wittlich district
28	Clutterche et Trittenheym ?	Klüsserath and Trittenheim	Trier-Saarburg district
29	alio Trittenheym ?	Trittenheim	Trier-Saarburg district
30	Glene	Altenglan	Kusel district
31	Odenbach	Odenbach	Kusel district
32	Wimesheym	Weinsheim	Bad Kreuznach district
33	Remeche	Remich	Grevenmacher District
34	Lullingen	Lullingen	Diekirch District
35	Riuat ?	Ruette ?	
36	Montini ?	Montigny-sur-Chiers	
37	item de Montini ?	Montigny-sur-Chiers	
38	Niuenru ?	S. Pancré ?	
39	Bouelicurt ?	Bovelicurt ?	
40	Vuans et Holonzi ?	Vance sur Semoy and Halanzy	
41	Wihc, quod est in episcupatu Meten ?	Vic-sur-Seille	
42	Fagit ?	Faxe ?	
43	Puzol ?	Puzieux ?	
44	Auuans ?	Awans	Liège Province
45	Vilancia	Villance	Libin, Belgian Luxembourg
46	Malbunpreyt	Mabompré	Houffalize, Belgian Luxembourg
47	Teuenihc ?	Tavigny	Houffalize, Belgian Luxembourg
48	Bastenacghe ?	Bastogne	
49	Wardanc ?	Wardin	
50	Longonuiler ?	Longvilly	
51	Nouille		
52	Bure	Boeur	
53	Wanpahc ?	Weiswampach	Weiswampach, Diekirch District
54	Hunlar ?	Holler and Gödingen	Weiswampach and Troisvierges, Diekirch District
55	Yuernesheym ?	Iversheim	Euskirchen district
56	Vingarden	Kreuzweingarten	Euskirchen district
57	Ekineskeit	Eicherscheid	Euskirchen district
58	Notine	Nöthen	Euskirchen district
59	Honespolt	Gut Hospelt	Euskirchen district
60	Effellesbure	Effelsberg	Euskirchen district
61	Buzzenswelt	Pützfeld, Ahrtal	Ahrbrück, Ahrweiler district
62	Keslighe	Kesseling	Ahrweiler district
63	Linde, Cruceberhg ?	Lind, Kreuzberg	Ahrweiler district
64	Wizsselle	Vischel (Berg)	Berg, Ahrweiler district
65	Aruuilre ?	Ahrweiler	Bad Neuenahr-Ahrweiler, Ahrweiler district
66	Elsaffe	Elsaff	Asbach and Buchholz, Neuwied district
