= Nims (river) =

River in Germany

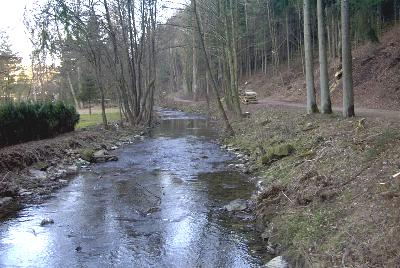
- The Nims near Schönecken in February 2004

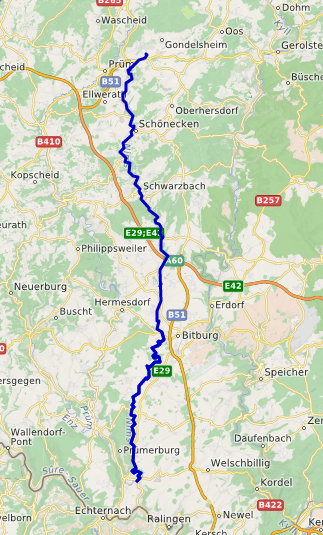
- Course of the Nims

Location
- Country: Germany
- State: Rhineland-Palatinate
- Reference no.: DE: 26288

Physical characteristics
- Source
  - location: In the Eifel southeast of Weinsheim
  - coordinates: 50°13′16″N 6°29′28″E
  - elevation: ca. 512 m above sea level (NHN)
- Mouth
  - location: Near Irrel into the Prüm
  - coordinates: 49°50′41″N 6°28′04″E
  - elevation: ca. 169 m above sea level (NHN)
- Length: 61.43 km
- Basin size: 297.702 km^{2} (114.943 sq mi)
- Discharge
  - location: an der Mündung
  - average: 3.17 m³/s

Basin features
- Progression: Prüm→ Sauer→ Moselle→ Rhine→ North Sea
- Landmarks: Small towns: Bitburg
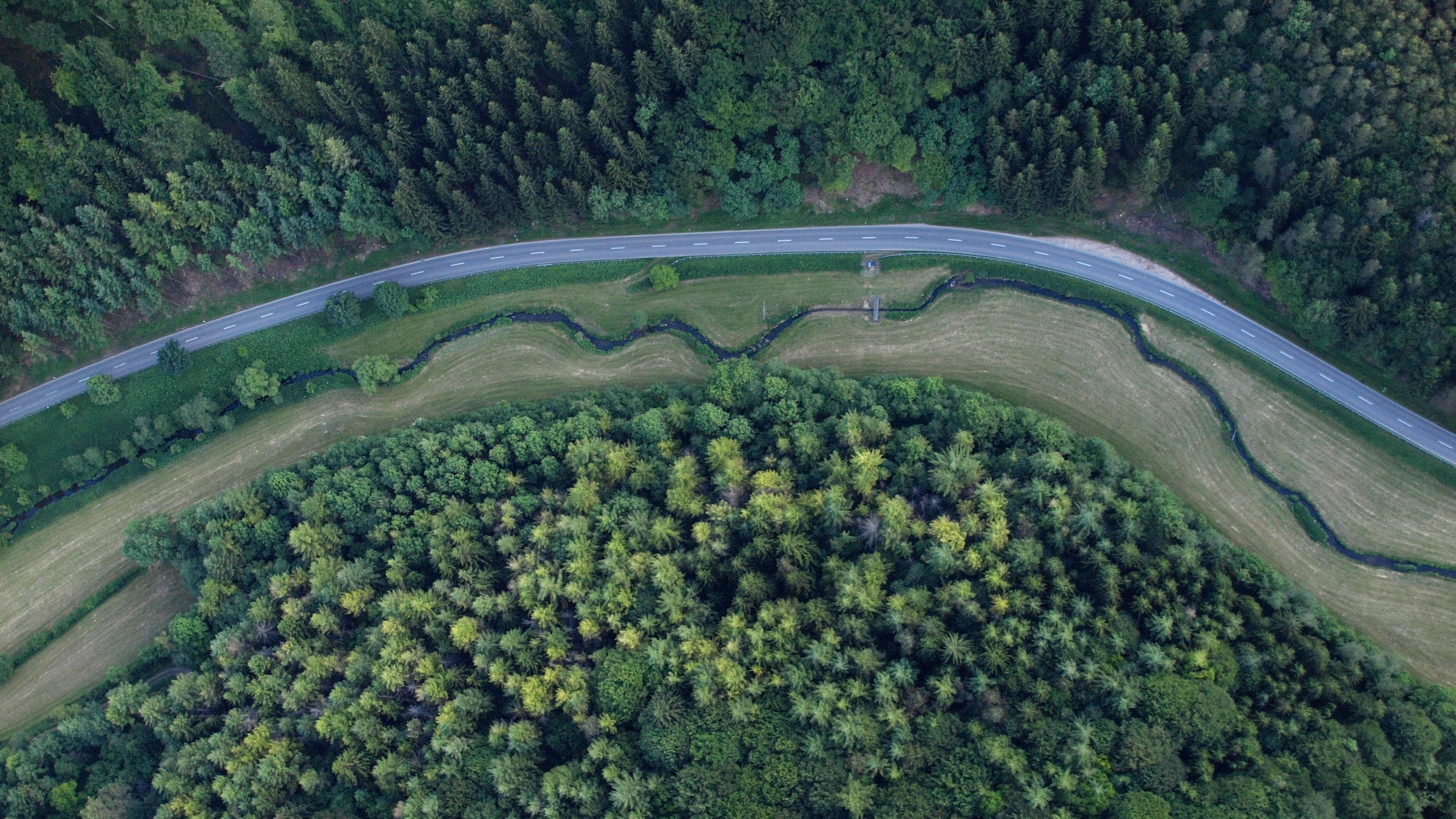
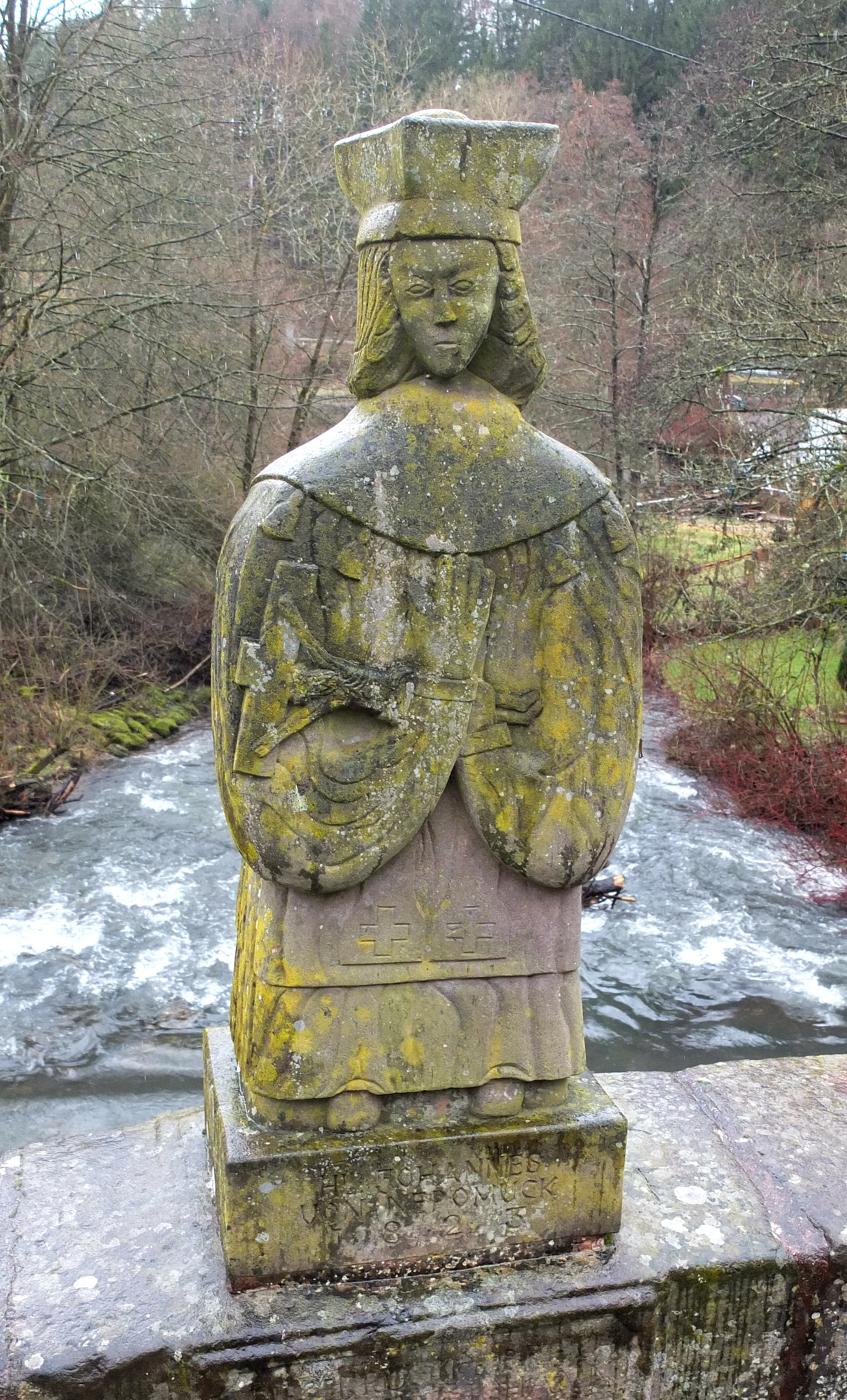
- The Nims near Giesdorf, 2015 aerial photograph Bridge saint, John of Nepomuk, above the Nims in Seffern

The Nims is a 61-kilometre-long (38 mi), left-hand tributary of the River Prüm in the South Eifel region of the Eifel Mountains. It runs through the county of Bitburg-Prüm in the German state of Rhineland-Palatinate.

== Geography ==
=== Course ===
The Nims rises in Weinsheim, east of the town of Prüm, in the Eifel mountains. It then flows in a southerly direction through a valley of the same, passing the villages of Schönecken and Seffern, and the western suburbs of Bitburg. The Nims joins the Prüm below Irrel.

=== Settlements ===
The Nims passes through or by the following settlements:

Rommersheim; Giesdorf; Schönecken; Nimsreuland; Lasel; Nimshuscheid (mill)	Seffern; Bickendorf; Nattenheim (mill); Rittersdorf; Bitburg (Stahl); Birtlingen	Messerich; Wolsfeld; Alsdorf; Niederweis; Irrel

=== Tributaries ===
The longest tributaries of the Nims are:

- Ehlenzbach
- Balesfelder Bach

==== Tributaries over six kilometres long ====
The left-hand tributaries are in dark blue, the right-hand ones on light blue, all shown in downstream order.

== History ==
One of the oldest records of the river refer to it under the name of Nimisa and date to the year 798 or 799 ("31st year of the reign of Charlemagne").

== Transport ==
The route of the old Nims-Sauer Valley railway ran through the southern section of the Nims valley from Messerich to Irrel. The line is now closed and has been partially lifted.

Between Bickendorf and Seffern the 781-metre-long (2,562 ft) Nims Viaduct on the Federal Motorway 60 crosses the valley of the Nims.

== Flora and fauna ==
The Nims river is known for the Eifel mountain trout, which thrives due to the low pH value and cold water. (Note: In 1959 the US President, Dwight D. Eisenhower, tasted this delicacy at the Königshof hotel during his visit to Bonn.)

== See also ==
- List of rivers of Rhineland-Palatinate
