= Hardtkopf (Eifel) =

- Location within Rhineland-Palatinate

Highest point
- Elevation: 601.5 m above sea level (NN) (1,973 ft)
- Coordinates: 50°10′21″N 6°25′12″E

Geography
- Location: Bitburg-Prüm, Rhineland-Palatinate, Germany
- Parent range: South Eifel

The Hardtkopf is a high hill in the county of Bitburg-Prüm in the German state of Rhineland-Palatinate. It rises in the South Eifel range and, at 601.5 m above sea level (NN), is the highest point on the edge of the Prüm Limestone Basin (Prümer Kalkmulde).

The Hardtkopf is located in the southern part of the High Fens-Eifel Nature Park, south of Prüm and northwest of Schönecken between the villages of Ellwerath (part of Rommersheim) in the north and Oberlauch in the south. To the west of the summit rises the little Prüm tributary, the Hennebach stream.

From the top of the Hardtkopf there are views of the who of the Prüm Limestone Basin and of Schöneck Switzerland (Schönecker Schweiz). In good weather, the edge of the Hunsrück mountains may be seen, about 60 kilometres away to the southeast. Until the early 20th century an observation tower stood on the summit. Today there is a transmission tower and a water tower.
