= Hardtkopf =

Hardtkopf may refer to the following hills in Germany:

- Hardtkopf (Eifel) (601.5 m), in the South Eifel, between Ellwerath and Oberlauch, county of Bitburg-Prüm, Rhineland-Palatinate
- Hardtkopf (Elbenberg) (363.8 m), in the Ostwaldeck Perimeter Basins, near Elbenberg, county of Kassel, Hesse
- Hardtkopf (Taunus) (Hardtküppel; 367.2 m), in the Taunus, near Grävenwiesbach, Hochtaunuskreis, Hesse

== See also ==
- Hardekopf
- Hartkopf
