= Mützenich =

Mützenich may refer to:

== Places ==
- Mützenich (bei Prüm), municipality in the district of Bitburg-Prüm, Rhineland-Palatinate, Germany
- Mützenich (Monschau), village in the municipality of Monschau, North Rhine-Westphalia, Germany

== People with the surname ==
- Rolf Mützenich, politician of the Social Democratic Party of Germany
