= Schönecken Castle =

- Burg Schönecken, Bella Costa, Clara Costa
- Schönecken
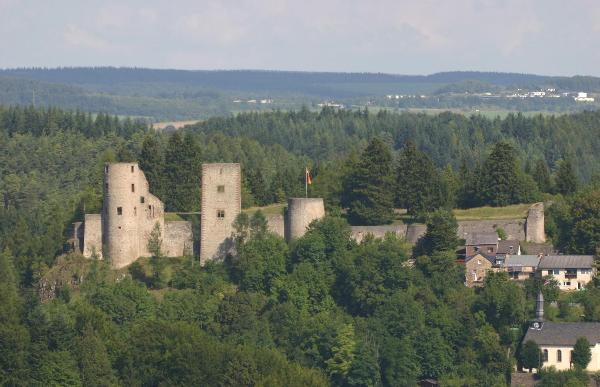
- The ruins of Schönecken in June 2005

Site information
- Type: hill castle
- Code: DE-RP
- Condition: Surviving enceinte

Location
- Coordinates: 50°09′37″N 6°27′43″E
- Height: 467 m above sea level (NHN)

Site history
- Built: c. 1230

Garrison information
- Occupants: Counts, nobility

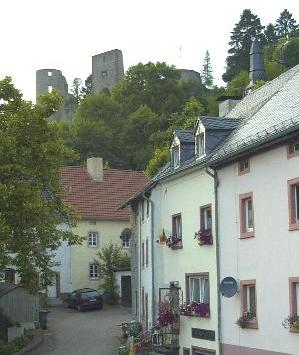
View of the ruins from Von Hersel Straße

Schönecken Castle (German: Burg Schönecken) is a ruined hill castle at 467 m above sea level (NN) above the village of Schönecken in the Nims valley in the West Eifel mountains. It lies within the county of Bitburg-Prüm in the German state of Rhineland-Palatinate. The castle stands on the lowest hill ridge in the middle of a valley bowl. The site is guarded on all sides by higher hills.

The ruins of Schönecken Castle are also called Bella Costa or Clara Costa.

== History ==
Short legend:

- 762 – King Pepin gifts the Wetteldorf estate to Prüm Abbey. The guardians (Schutzvögte) of the abbey were the counts of Vianden.
- c. 1230 – Probably construction of Clara Costa castle.
- 1247 – Albertus Magnus and Conrad of Hochstaden at the castle
- 1264 – Henry of Vianden calls himself "Lord of Schönecken".
- 1288 – Gerhard of Schönecken killed two monks from Prüm in a dispute.
- 1352 – Hartard of Schönecken falls in battle for Baldwin of Trier.
- 1370 – John, the last Lord of Schönecken, dies.
- 1384 – Schönecken goes to the Electorate of Trier. The castle is the residence of the prince-electors.
- 1593 – Knight and burgmann, Hermann of Hersel, dies on 13 July and is buried in Saint Leodegar (Catholic parish church) in Wetteldorf.
- 1643 – Castle captured by mercenaries.
- 1802 – Schönecken razed.
- 1804 – Under French rule, the castle is seized and auctioned for demolition.
- 1848 – The Kingdom of Prussia becomes its owner.
- 1906 – First restoration of the castle by Prussia
- 1920s – Dr. Johannes Schreiber (1893–1978) prevents the final destruction of the ruins.
- 1970–1975 – Defensive towers and walls of the castle are renovated by the Rhineland-Palatinate Castle Administration.
- 1984–1985 – Renovation of the castle and hill with sprayed concrete.
- 2006 – Castle trail placed out-of-bounds due to the risk of collapse of the castle wall; renovation is planned; severe weathering damage identified on the towers.

The present owner of the castle is the state of Rhineland-Palatinate.

== Feud (1340–1350) ==
Less happy was a feud that Hartard had with Otto of Schönberg. According to this account, some of the lance bearers of the Lord of Schönberg went to Schönecken to buy grain there, because there was none in the area of Schönberg at that time. Hartard ordered his men to chase Schonberg's men away. In order to avenge this abuse, Otto of Schönberg advanced on Schönecken and besieged the castle. Hartard mocked him and called to him from the palace, saying, "I'm very pleased, Lord Otto, that you are paying me a visit", to which Otto replied, "The devil make you crawl in the dirt for a long time in order to punish you, my servants are not women, come out, and you'll taste the servants!" Hartard then sallied out, beat Schönberg's men and pursued them to Schönberg. At Schönberg, Otto sat down and received support from his subjects. After a violent fight, the Schönecks fled and Hartard's son was beaten to death. The women of Schönberg are said to have torn his body into pieces and thrown it to the dogs. Otto followed the Schönecks to Schönecken where fighting broke out again. Otto and Hartard met and fought against each other. Otto split the Hartard's helmet and wounded him in the head, after which Hartard fled and threw himself into his castle, which Otto now besieged. Finally, Hartard was forced to buy the enemy's withdrawal with 100 guilders.

== Description ==
The castle occupies a 120-metre-long rectangular site with an enceinte and three projecting towers. In the east the site is guarded by a wide neck ditch. The three towers stand on the south side, two of them being still three storeys high. The two round towers probably date to the 13th or 14th century, the central, rectangular one is more recent. All three towers and their curtain walls have been part of a multi-storey residential building since no later than the 16th century, as depicted in an 18th-century painting.

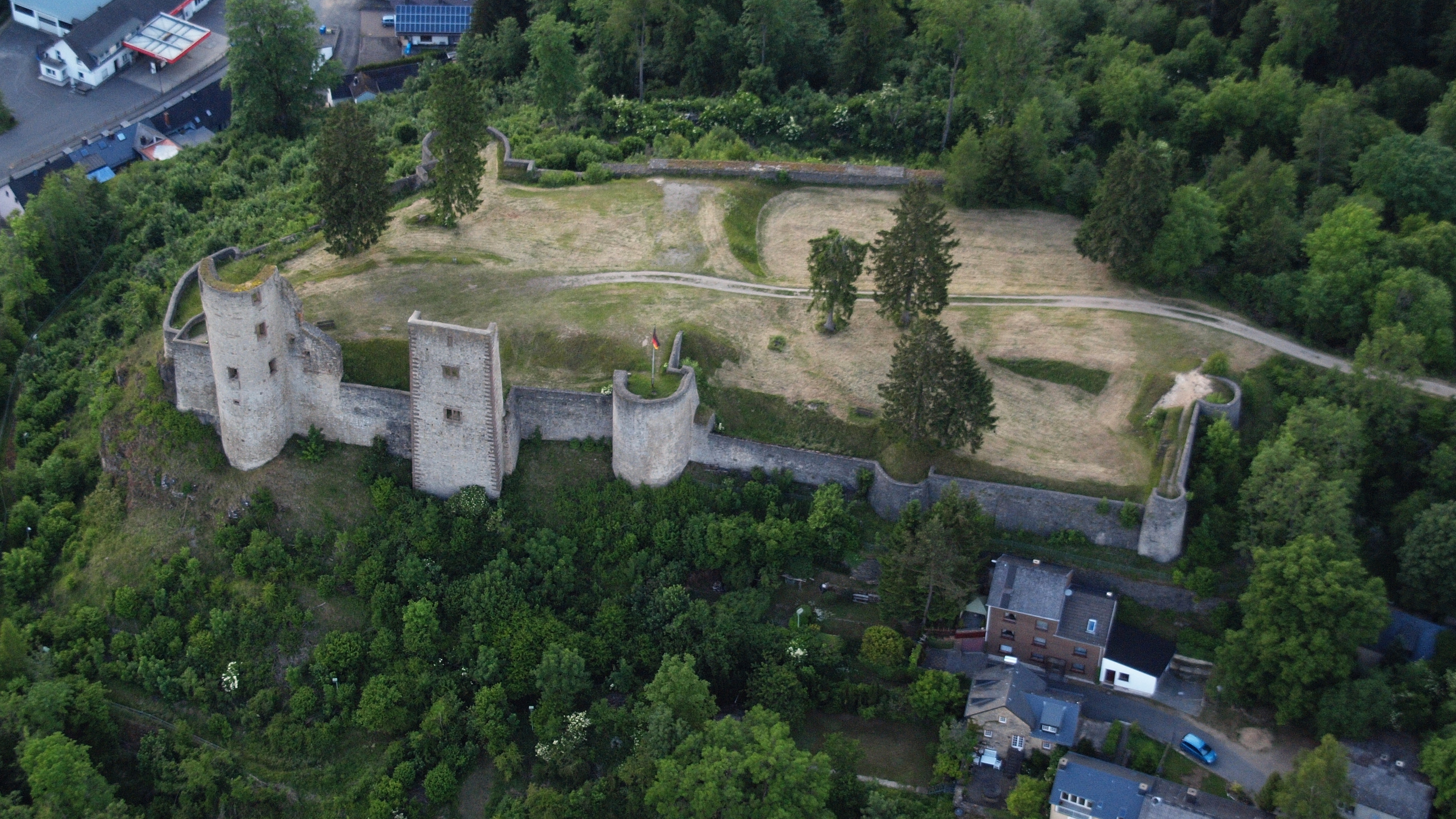
Schönecken Castle, 2015 aerial photograph

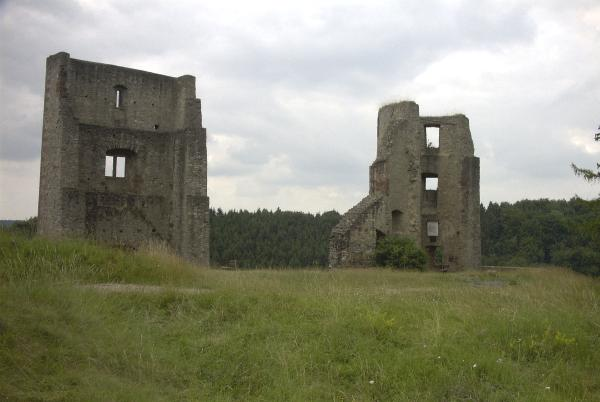
Castle inner courtyard and towers in August 2003

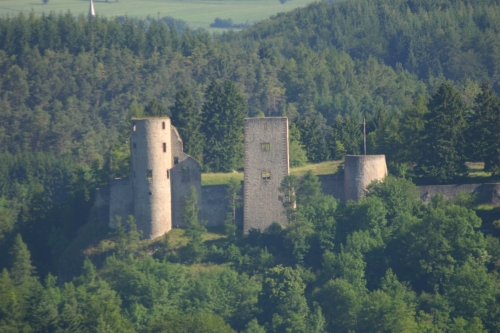
Castle ruins
