= Weinsheim =

Weinsheim may refer to several places in Germany both in Rhineland-Palatinate:

- Weinsheim, Bitburg-Prüm
- Weinsheim, Bad Kreuznach
