= Olzheim =

- Municipality
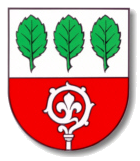
- Coat of arms

- Location of Olzheim within Eifelkreis Bitburg-Prüm district
- Interactive map of Olzheim
- Location within Germany Location within Rhineland-Palatinate
- Coordinates: 50°16′21″N 6°27′31″E
- Country: Germany
- State: Rhineland-Palatinate
- District: Eifelkreis Bitburg-Prüm
- Municipal assoc.: Prüm

Government
  - Mayor (2019–24): Oswin Hoffmann

Area
  - Total: 16.22 km^{2} (6.26 sq mi)
- Elevation: 496 m (1,627 ft)

Population (2025-12-31)
  - Total: 582
  - Density: 35.9/km^{2} (92.9/sq mi)
- Time zone: UTC+01:00 (CET)
  - Summer (DST): UTC+02:00 (CEST)
- Postal codes: 54597
- Dialling codes: 06552
- Vehicle registration: BIT, PRÜ
- Website: www.olzheim.de

Olzheim is a municipality in the district of Bitburg-Prüm, in Rhineland-Palatinate, western Germany.
