= Großlangenfeld =

- Municipality
- Coat of arms

- Location of Großlangenfeld within Eifelkreis Bitburg-Prüm district
- Interactive map of Großlangenfeld
- Location within Germany Location within Rhineland-Palatinate
- Coordinates: 50°13′12.97″N 6°15′8.51″E
- Country: Germany
- State: Rhineland-Palatinate
- District: Eifelkreis Bitburg-Prüm
- Municipal assoc.: Prüm

Government
  - Mayor (2019–24): Erich Kribs

Area
  - Total: 6.98 km^{2} (2.69 sq mi)
- Elevation: 508 m (1,667 ft)

Population (2025-12-31)
  - Total: 124
  - Density: 17.8/km^{2} (46.0/sq mi)
- Time zone: UTC+01:00 (CET)
  - Summer (DST): UTC+02:00 (CEST)
- Postal codes: 54608
- Dialling codes: 06555
- Vehicle registration: BIT
- Website: Großlangenfeld at website www.pruem.de

Großlangenfeld is a municipality in the district of Bitburg-Prüm, in Rhineland-Palatinate, western Germany.
