= Roth bei Prüm =

- Municipality
- Location of Roth bei Prüm within Eifelkreis Bitburg-Prüm district
- Interactive map of Roth bei Prüm
- Location within Germany Location within Rhineland-Palatinate
- Coordinates: 50°18′32″N 6°23′20″E
- Country: Germany
- State: Rhineland-Palatinate
- District: Eifelkreis Bitburg-Prüm
- Municipal assoc.: Prüm

Government
  - Mayor (2019–24): Michael Brodel

Area
  - Total: 19.08 km^{2} (7.37 sq mi)
- Elevation: 589 m (1,932 ft)

Population (2025-12-31)
  - Total: 440
  - Density: 23/km^{2} (60/sq mi)
- Time zone: UTC+01:00 (CET)
  - Summer (DST): UTC+02:00 (CEST)
- Postal codes: 54597
- Dialling codes: 06552
- Vehicle registration: BIT
- Website: Roth at website www.pruem.de

Roth bei Prüm is a municipality in the district of Bitburg-Prüm, in Rhineland-Palatinate, western Germany.
