= Heckhuscheid =

- Municipality
- Location of Heckhuscheid within Eifelkreis Bitburg-Prüm district
- Interactive map of Heckhuscheid
- Location within Germany Location within Rhineland-Palatinate
- Coordinates: 50°10′43″N 6°13′24″E
- Country: Germany
- State: Rhineland-Palatinate
- District: Eifelkreis Bitburg-Prüm
- Municipal assoc.: Prüm

Government
  - Mayor (2019–24): Josef Arens

Area
  - Total: 8.28 km^{2} (3.20 sq mi)
- Elevation: 560 m (1,840 ft)

Population (2025-12-31)
  - Total: 157
  - Density: 19.0/km^{2} (49.1/sq mi)
- Time zone: UTC+01:00 (CET)
  - Summer (DST): UTC+02:00 (CEST)
- Postal codes: 54619
- Dialling codes: 06559
- Vehicle registration: BIT
- Website: Heckhuscheid at website www.pruem.de

Heckhuscheid is a municipality in the district of Bitburg-Prüm, in Rhineland-Palatinate, western Germany.

Heckhuscheid is situated at an elevation of approximately 554 to 560 meters above sea level.

Heckhuscheid covers an area of roughly 8.28 square kilometers.

The population of Heckhuscheid is very small, with approximately 165 residents according to the 2019 census.
