= Wawern, Bitburg-Prüm =

Wawern
- Municipality
- Coat of arms

- Location of Wawern within Eifelkreis Bitburg-Prüm district
- Interactive map of Wawern
- Location within Germany Location within Rhineland-Palatinate
- Coordinates: 50°6′56″N 6°29′18″E
- Country: Germany
- State: Rhineland-Palatinate
- District: Eifelkreis Bitburg-Prüm
- Municipal assoc.: Prüm

Government
  - Mayor (2019–24): Axel Goldmann

Area
  - Total: 7.64 km^{2} (2.95 sq mi)
- Elevation: 450 m (1,480 ft)

Population (2025-12-31)
  - Total: 259
  - Density: 33.9/km^{2} (87.8/sq mi)
- Time zone: UTC+01:00 (CET)
  - Summer (DST): UTC+02:00 (CEST)
- Postal codes: 54612
- Dialling codes: 06553
- Vehicle registration: BIT
- Website: Wawern at site www.pruem.de

Wawern is a municipality in the district of Bitburg-Prüm, in Rhineland-Palatinate, western Germany.
