= Heisdorf, Germany =

Heisdorf
- Municipality
- Location of Heisdorf within Eifelkreis Bitburg-Prüm district
- Interactive map of Heisdorf
- Location within Germany Location within Rhineland-Palatinate
- Coordinates: 50°08′04″N 6°25′48″E
- Country: Germany
- State: Rhineland-Palatinate
- District: Eifelkreis Bitburg-Prüm
- Municipal assoc.: Prüm

Government
  - Mayor (2019–24): Rolf Brügel

Area
  - Total: 3.91 km^{2} (1.51 sq mi)
- Elevation: 515 m (1,690 ft)

Population (2025-12-31)
  - Total: 110
  - Density: 28/km^{2} (73/sq mi)
- Time zone: UTC+01:00 (CET)
  - Summer (DST): UTC+02:00 (CEST)
- Postal codes: 54614
- Dialling codes: 06553
- Vehicle registration: BIT
- Website: Heisdorf at website www.pruem.de

Heisdorf is a municipality in the district of Bitburg-Prüm, in Rhineland-Palatinate, western Germany.
