= Masthorn =

- Municipality
- Location of Masthorn within Eifelkreis Bitburg-Prüm district
- Interactive map of Masthorn
- Location within Germany Location within Rhineland-Palatinate
- Coordinates: 50°9′N 6°18′E
- Country: Germany
- State: Rhineland-Palatinate
- District: Eifelkreis Bitburg-Prüm
- Municipal assoc.: Prüm

Government
  - Mayor (2019–24): Theobald Richertz

Area
  - Total: 4.54 km^{2} (1.75 sq mi)
- Elevation: 459 m (1,506 ft)

Population (2025-12-31)
  - Total: 58
  - Density: 13/km^{2} (33/sq mi)
- Time zone: UTC+01:00 (CET)
  - Summer (DST): UTC+02:00 (CEST)
- Postal codes: 54597
- Dialling codes: 06556
- Vehicle registration: BIT
- Website: Masthorn at website www.pruem.de

Masthorn is a municipality in the district of Bitburg-Prüm, in Rhineland-Palatinate, western Germany.
