= Wallersheim =

- Municipality
- Coat of arms

- Location of Wallersheim within Eifelkreis Bitburg-Prüm district
- Interactive map of Wallersheim
- Location within Germany Location within Rhineland-Palatinate
- Coordinates: 50°12′14″N 6°31′46″E
- Country: Germany
- State: Rhineland-Palatinate
- District: Eifelkreis Bitburg-Prüm
- Municipal assoc.: Prüm

Government
  - Mayor (2023–24): Bruno Büsch

Area
  - Total: 14.51 km^{2} (5.60 sq mi)
- Elevation: 520 m (1,710 ft)

Population (2025-12-31)
  - Total: 736
  - Density: 50.7/km^{2} (131/sq mi)
- Time zone: UTC+01:00 (CET)
  - Summer (DST): UTC+02:00 (CEST)
- Postal codes: 54597
- Dialling codes: 06558
- Vehicle registration: BIT
- Website: www.wallersheim-eifel.de

Wallersheim is a municipality in the district of Bitburg-Prüm, in Rhineland-Palatinate, western Germany. It is located 7 km (4.3 mi) east of Prüm in a wide valley and can be reached via the B410 from Fleringen and Büdesheim.

Wallersheim belonged to the Prüm Abbey until the end of the 18th century. In 1815/16 Wallersheim came under Prussian rule. The parish church is dedicated to St. Nicholas.
