= German-Luxembourg Nature Park =

Nature Park

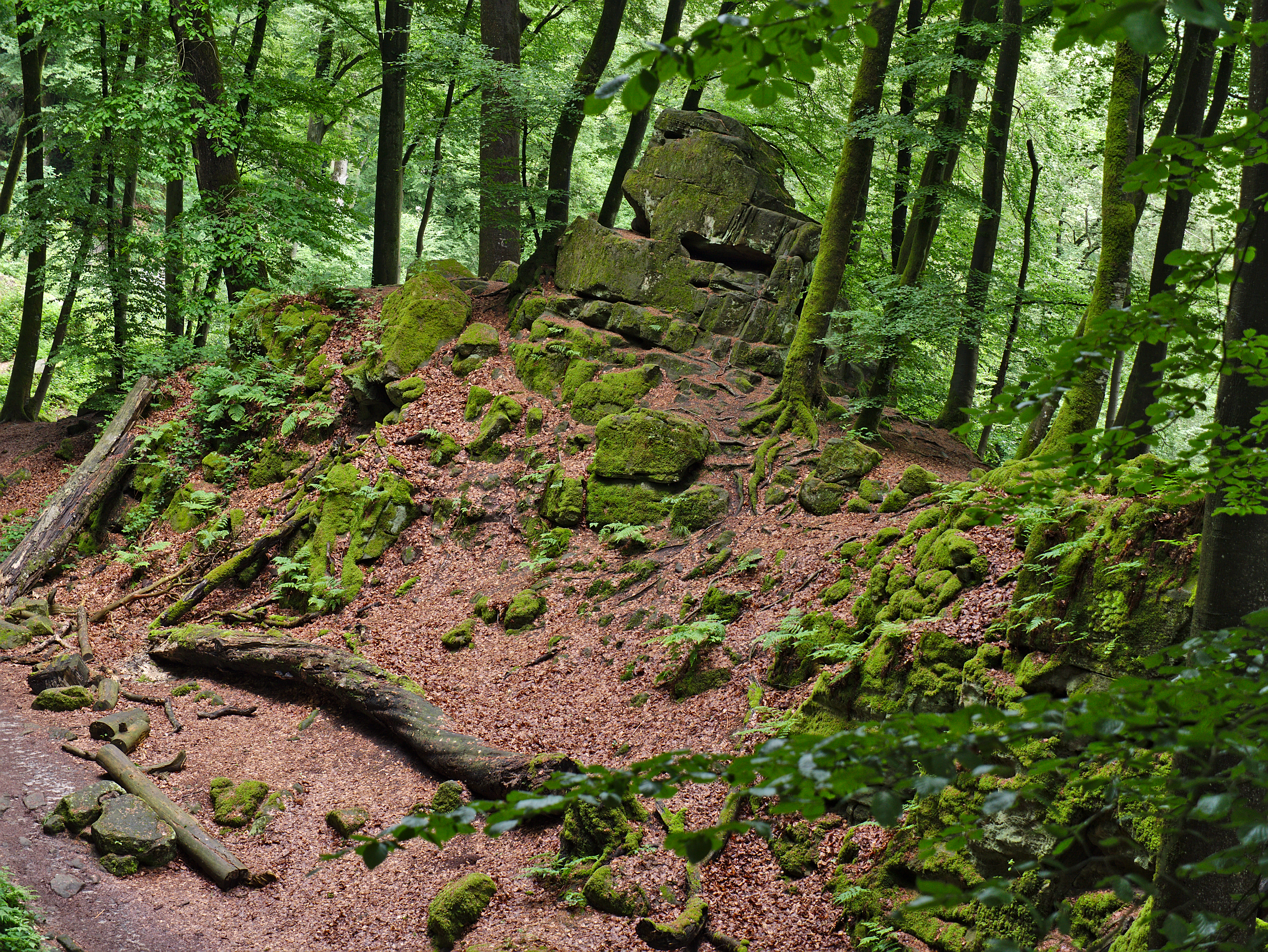
- Eroded sandstone outcroppings. At Teufelsschlucht.

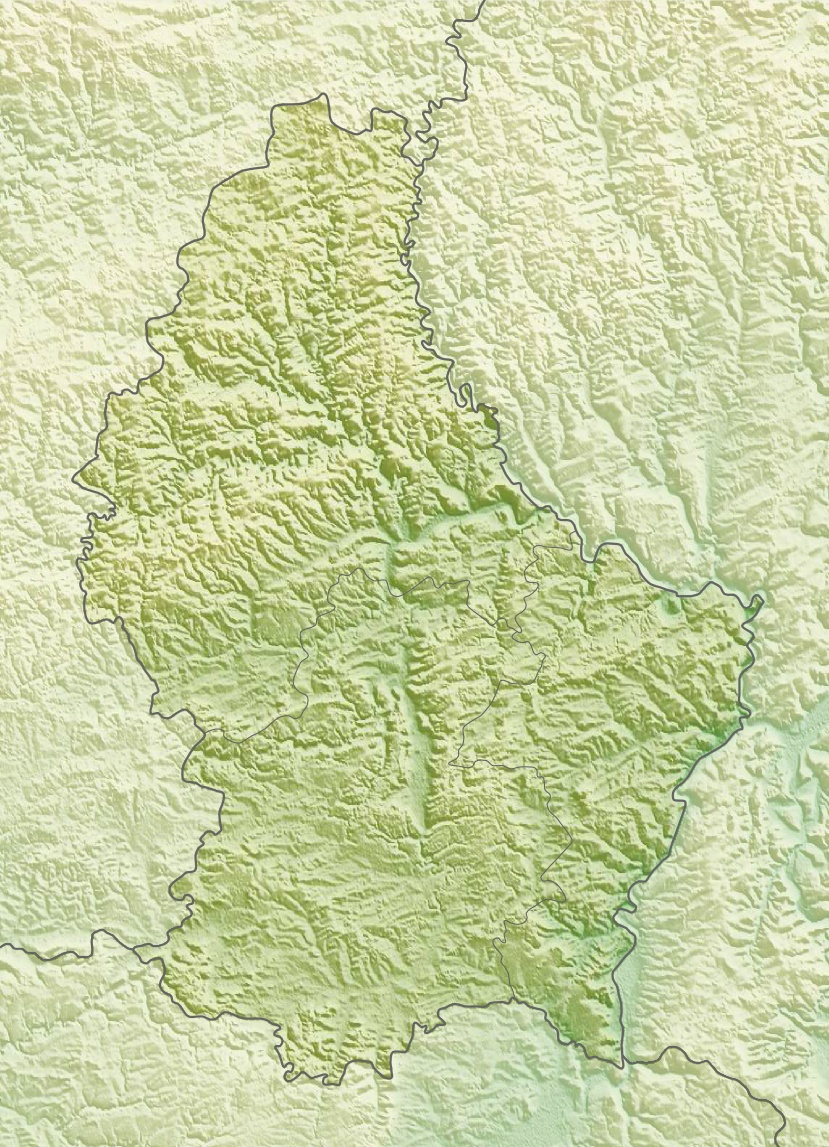
- Location within Rhineland-Palatinate Location within Luxembourg
- Interactive map of German-Luxembourg Nature Park
- Location: Germany and Luxembourg
- Coordinates: 49°59′00″N 6°08′54″E
- Area: 789 km^{2} (305 sq mi)
- Established: 1964

The German-Luxembourg Nature Park (German: Deutsch-Luxemburgische Naturpark) is a cross-border nature park, which was established on 17 April 1964 by state treaty between the German state of Rhineland-Palatinate and the Grand Duchy of Luxembourg. It thus became the first cross-border nature park in Western Europe. On the German side Naturpark Südeifel is providing services for visitors.

The park covers an area of 789 km^{2} along the northern German-Luxembourg border, of which 432 km^{2} are on the Rhine side and 357 km^{2} on the Grand Duchy side. In Germany, the area of the park is identical with the South Eifel Landscape Park (German: Naturpark Südeifel) established in 1958, while the greater part of the Luxembourg side coincides with the Our Landscape Park (German: Naturpark Our, French: Parc naturel de l'Our).

The park covers the Our river valley separating the two countries and the low mountains of the Ardennes from the Eifel, in its southern part there is a region known as Little Luxembourg Switzerland (Luxembourgish: Kleng Lëtzebuerger Schwäiz, German: Luxemburger Schweiz, French: Petite Suisse luxembourgeoise). The attractions of the park include numerous monuments (e.g. Vianden Castle, former monastery in Echternach), villages and towns, river valleys with numerous waterfalls, mills and geological formations, forests, cultural heritage (the dancing procession in Echternach is inscribed on the UNESCO Intangible Heritage List). Within the park, 25 nature reserves and numerous other forms of nature protection have been established.

== Gallery ==
German-Luxembourg Nature Park
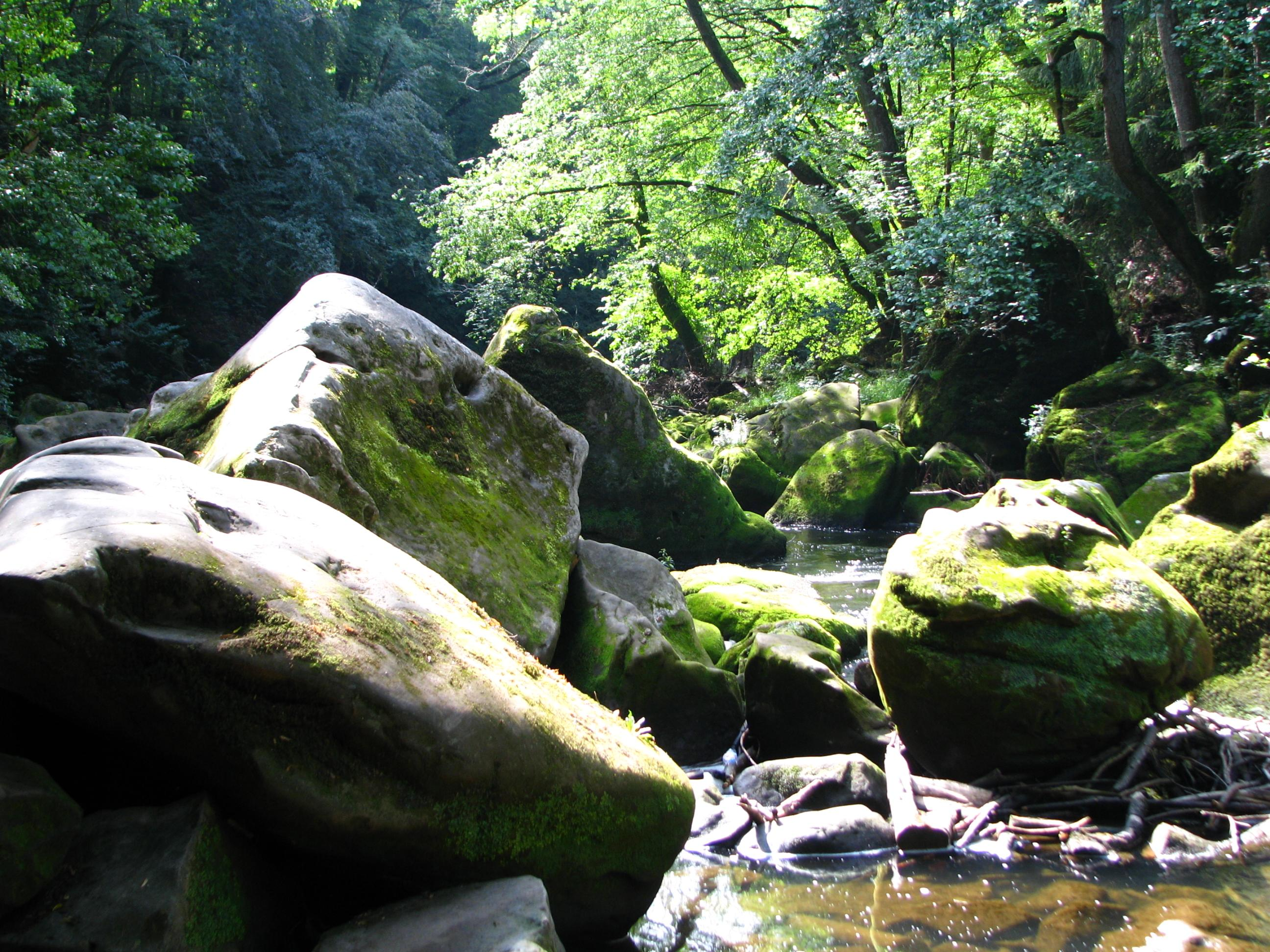
Prüm river

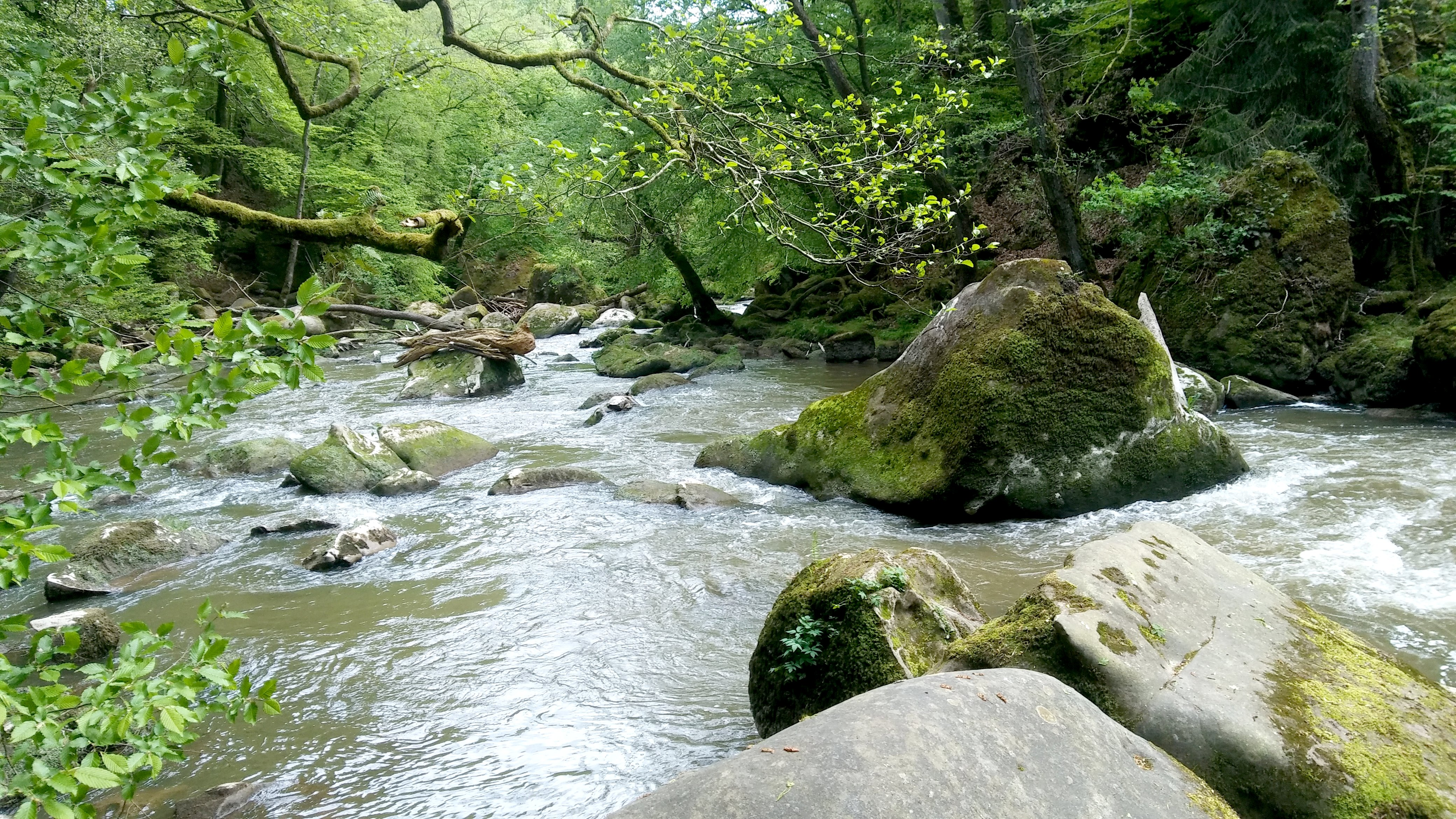

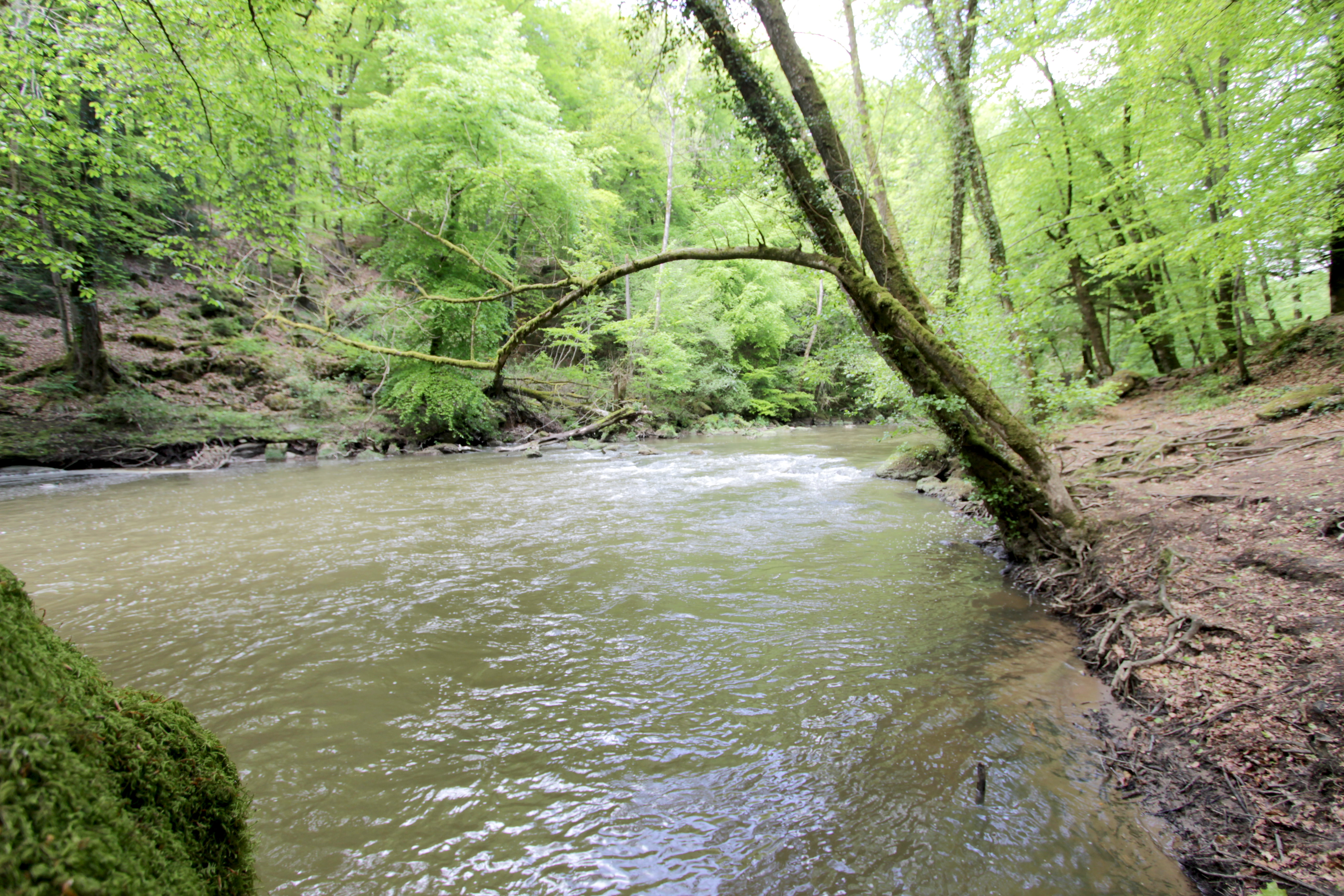

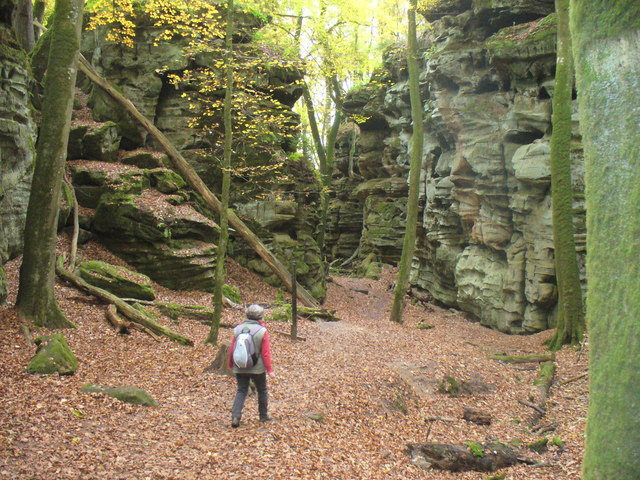
At Teufelsschlucht (Devils Gorge)

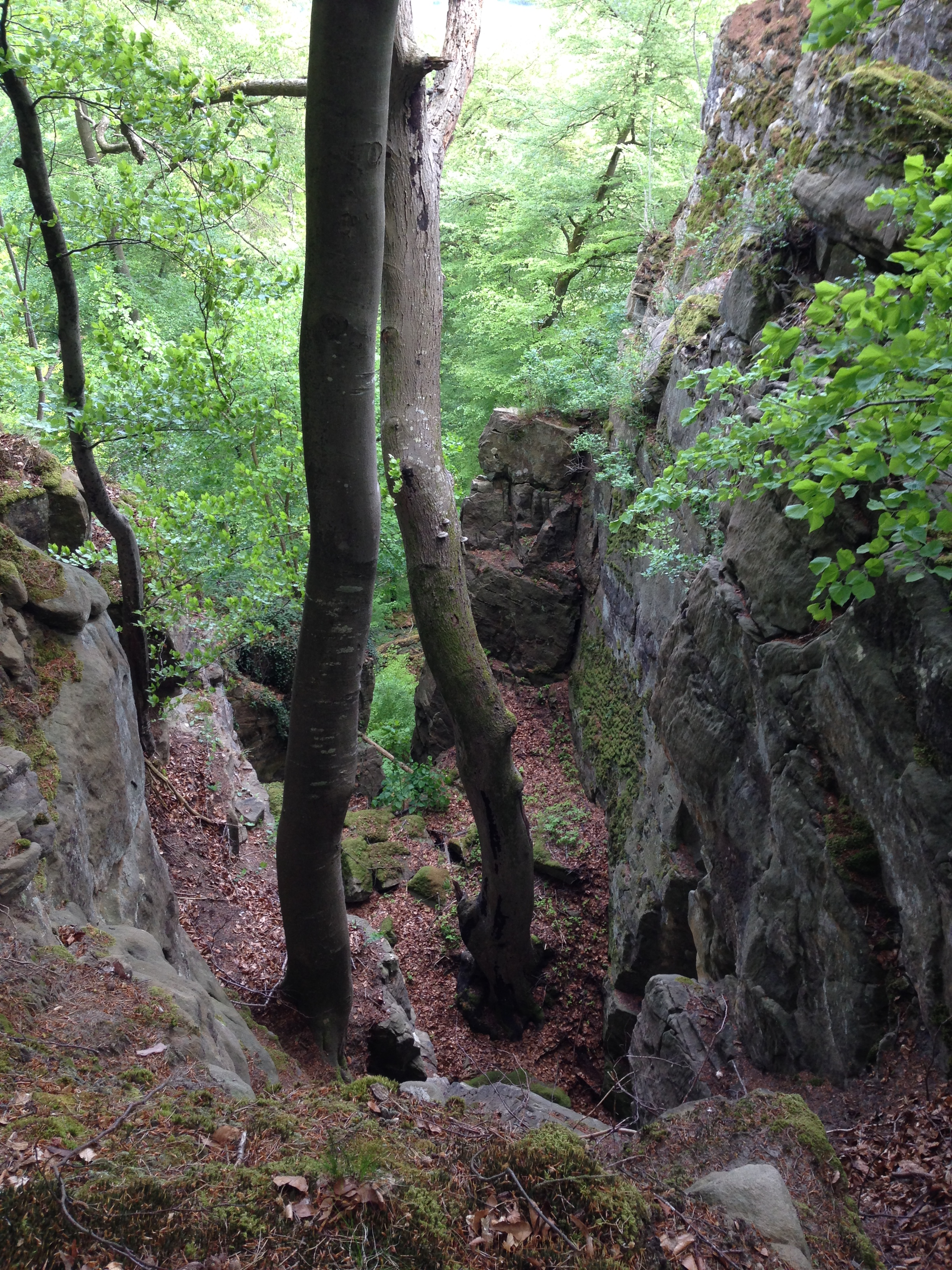

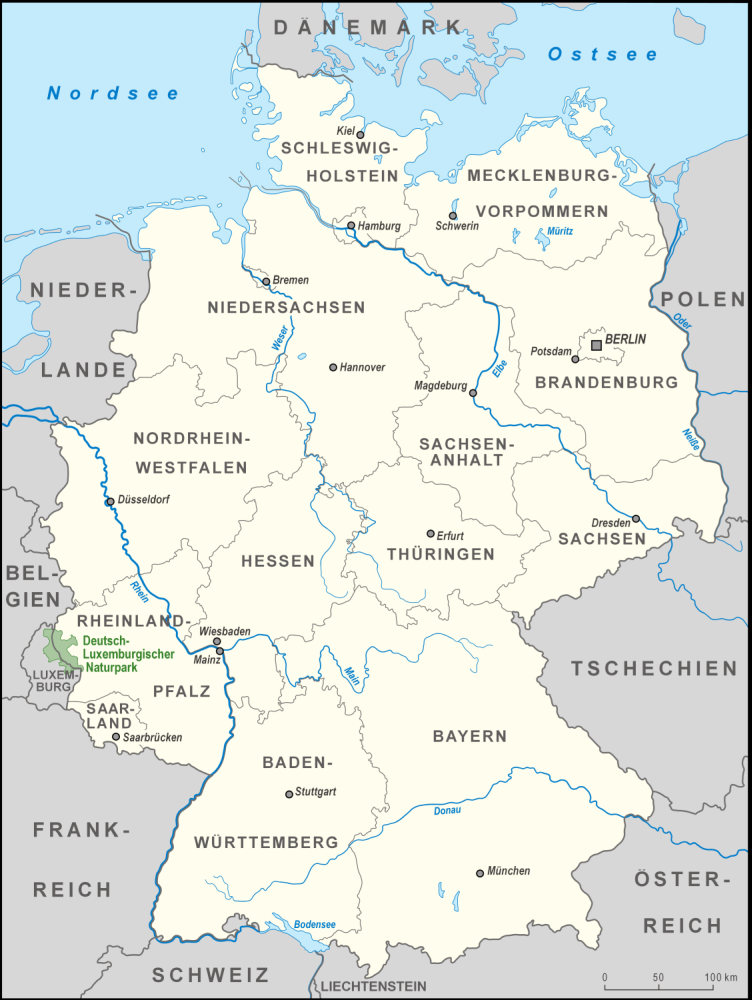
Map of German-Luxembourg Nature Park

== Literature ==
- Christian Humberg: Ein Riese namens Heimat – Streifzüge durch den Deutsch-Luxemburgischen Naturpark Eifelbildverlag, Daun, 2013, ISBN 978-3-9814113-2-4

== See also ==
- Our (river)
- Ardennes
- South Eifel
- List of nature parks in Germany
