= Brandscheid =

- Municipality
- Coat of arms

- Location of Brandscheid within Eifelkreis Bitburg-Prüm district
- Interactive map of Brandscheid
- Location within Germany Location within Rhineland-Palatinate
- Coordinates: 50°13′16.73″N 06°18′34.9″E
- Country: Germany
- State: Rhineland-Palatinate
- District: Eifelkreis Bitburg-Prüm
- Municipal assoc.: Prüm

Government
  - Mayor (2019–24): Helmut Neuerburg

Area
  - Total: 16.26 km^{2} (6.28 sq mi)
- Elevation: 555 m (1,821 ft)

Population (2025-12-31)
  - Total: 299
  - Density: 18.4/km^{2} (47.6/sq mi)
- Time zone: UTC+01:00 (CET)
  - Summer (DST): UTC+02:00 (CEST)
- Postal codes: 54608
- Dialling codes: 06555
- Vehicle registration: BIT
- Website: www.brandscheid-eifel.de

Brandscheid (German pronunciation: [ˈbʁantˌʃaɪt]) is a municipality in the district of Bitburg-Prüm, in Rhineland-Palatinate, western Germany.
