= Feuerscheid =

- Municipality
- Coat of arms

- Location of Feuerscheid within Eifelkreis Bitburg-Prüm district
- Interactive map of Feuerscheid
- Location within Germany Location within Rhineland-Palatinate
- Coordinates: 50°06′08″N 6°27′16″E
- Country: Germany
- State: Rhineland-Palatinate
- District: Eifelkreis Bitburg-Prüm
- Municipal assoc.: Prüm

Government
  - Mayor (2019–24): Harald Kinnen

Area
  - Total: 5.92 km^{2} (2.29 sq mi)
- Elevation: 470 m (1,540 ft)

Population (2025-12-31)
  - Total: 312
  - Density: 52.7/km^{2} (136/sq mi)
- Time zone: UTC+01:00 (CET)
  - Summer (DST): UTC+02:00 (CEST)
- Postal codes: 54597
- Dialling codes: 06553, 06554
- Vehicle registration: BIT
- Website: www.feuerscheid-eifel.de

Feuerscheid is a municipality in the district of Bitburg-Prüm, in Rhineland-Palatinate, western Germany.
