= Auw bei Prüm =

- Municipality
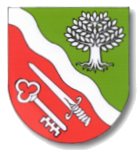
- Coat of arms

- Location of Auw bei Prüm within Eifelkreis Bitburg-Prüm district
- Interactive map of Auw bei Prüm
- Location within Germany Location within Rhineland-Palatinate
- Coordinates: 50°18′2.5″N 06°20′16.87″E
- Country: Germany
- State: Rhineland-Palatinate
- District: Eifelkreis Bitburg-Prüm
- Municipal assoc.: Prüm
- Subdivisions: 6

Government
  - Mayor (2019–24): Peter Eichten

Area
  - Total: 22.11 km^{2} (8.54 sq mi)
- Elevation: 538–572 m (1,765–1,877 ft)

Population (2025-12-31)
  - Total: 572
  - Density: 25.9/km^{2} (67.0/sq mi)
- Time zone: UTC+01:00 (CET)
  - Summer (DST): UTC+02:00 (CEST)
- Postal codes: 54597
- Dialling codes: 06552
- Vehicle registration: BIT
- Website: www.auw-eifel.de

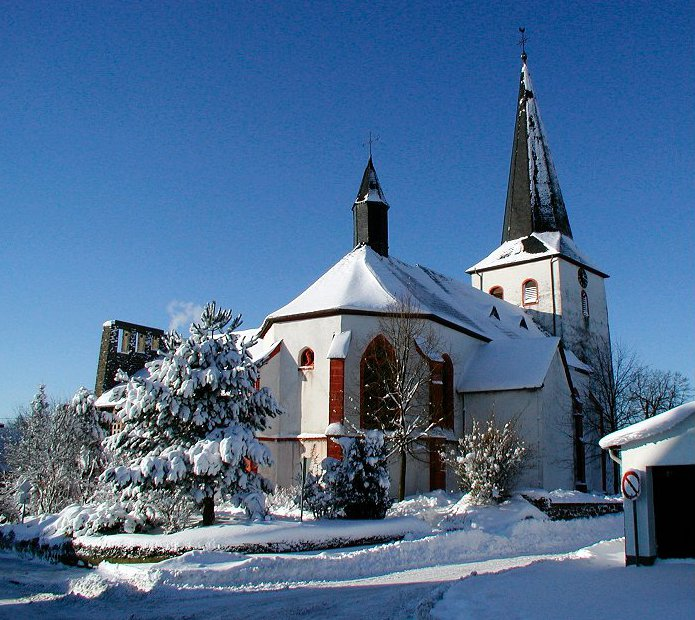
Church St. Peter and Paul in winter

Auw bei Prüm is a municipality in the district of Bitburg-Prüm, in Rhineland-Palatinate, western Germany.
