= Neuendorf, Rhineland-Palatinate =

Neuendorf
- Municipality
- Coat of arms

- Location of Neuendorf within Eifelkreis Bitburg-Prüm district
- Interactive map of Neuendorf
- Location within Germany Location within Rhineland-Palatinate
- Coordinates: 50°16′57″N 6°27′32″E
- Country: Germany
- State: Rhineland-Palatinate
- District: Eifelkreis Bitburg-Prüm
- Municipal assoc.: Prüm

Government
  - Mayor (2019–24): Werner Bartz

Area
  - Total: 5.71 km^{2} (2.20 sq mi)
- Elevation: 520 m (1,710 ft)

Population (2025-12-31)
  - Total: 105
  - Density: 18.4/km^{2} (47.6/sq mi)
- Time zone: UTC+01:00 (CET)
  - Summer (DST): UTC+02:00 (CEST)
- Postal codes: 54597
- Dialling codes: 06552
- Vehicle registration: BIT
- Website: Neuendorf at website www.pruem.de

Neuendorf (German pronunciation: [ˈnɔʏəndɔʁf]) is a municipality in the district of Bitburg-Prüm, in Rhineland-Palatinate, western Germany.
