= Oberlascheid =

- Municipality
- Location of Oberlascheid within Eifelkreis Bitburg-Prüm district
- Interactive map of Oberlascheid
- Location within Germany Location within Rhineland-Palatinate
- Coordinates: 50°15′44″N 6°18′31″E
- Country: Germany
- State: Rhineland-Palatinate
- District: Eifelkreis Bitburg-Prüm
- Municipal assoc.: Prüm

Government
  - Mayor (2019–24): Rita Becker

Area
  - Total: 9.39 km^{2} (3.63 sq mi)
- Elevation: 530 m (1,740 ft)

Population (2025-12-31)
  - Total: 131
  - Density: 14.0/km^{2} (36.1/sq mi)
- Time zone: UTC+01:00 (CET)
  - Summer (DST): UTC+02:00 (CEST)
- Postal codes: 54608
- Dialling codes: 06555
- Vehicle registration: BIT
- Website: Oberlascheid at website www.pruem.de

Oberlascheid is a municipality in the district of Bitburg-Prüm, in Rhineland-Palatinate, western Germany.
