= Fleringen, Germany =

Fleringen
- Municipality
- Coat of arms

- Location of Fleringen within Eifelkreis Bitburg-Prüm district
- Interactive map of Fleringen
- Location within Germany Location within Rhineland-Palatinate
- Coordinates: 50°12′30″N 6°30′01″E
- Country: Germany
- State: Rhineland-Palatinate
- District: Eifelkreis Bitburg-Prüm
- Municipal assoc.: Prüm
- Subdivisions: 2

Government
  - Mayor (2019–24): Lothar Lamberty

Area
  - Total: 8.50 km^{2} (3.28 sq mi)
- Elevation: 508 m (1,667 ft)

Population (2025-12-31)
  - Total: 410
  - Density: 48/km^{2} (120/sq mi)
- Time zone: UTC+01:00 (CET)
  - Summer (DST): UTC+02:00 (CEST)
- Postal codes: 54597
- Dialling codes: 06558
- Vehicle registration: BIT
- Website: www.fleringen.de

Fleringen is a municipality in the district of Bitburg-Prüm, in Rhineland-Palatinate, western Germany.
