= Winringen =

- Municipality
- Location of Winringen within Eifelkreis Bitburg-Prüm district
- Interactive map of Winringen
- Location within Germany Location within Rhineland-Palatinate
- Coordinates: 50°09′17″N 06°24′56″E
- Country: Germany
- State: Rhineland-Palatinate
- District: Eifelkreis Bitburg-Prüm
- Municipal assoc.: Prüm

Government
  - Mayor (2019–24): Wilhelm Meyers

Area
  - Total: 2.55 km^{2} (0.98 sq mi)
- Elevation: 485 m (1,591 ft)

Population (2025-12-31)
  - Total: 63
  - Density: 25/km^{2} (64/sq mi)
- Time zone: UTC+01:00 (CET)
  - Summer (DST): UTC+02:00 (CEST)
- Postal codes: 54614
- Dialling codes: 06553
- Vehicle registration: BIT
- Website: Winringen at website www.pruem.de

Winringen (German pronunciation: [ˈvɪnʁɪŋən]) is a municipality in the district of Bitburg-Prüm, in Rhineland-Palatinate, western Germany.
