= Buchet, Germany =

Buchet
- Municipality
- Location of Buchet within Eifelkreis Bitburg-Prüm district
- Interactive map of Buchet
- Location within Germany Location within Rhineland-Palatinate
- Coordinates: 50°14′38.56″N 6°19′0.61″E
- Country: Germany
- State: Rhineland-Palatinate
- District: Eifelkreis Bitburg-Prüm
- Municipal assoc.: Prüm

Government
  - Mayor (2019–24): Alois Fußmann

Area
  - Total: 13.32 km^{2} (5.14 sq mi)
- Elevation: 520 m (1,710 ft)

Population (2025-12-31)
  - Total: 250
  - Density: 19/km^{2} (49/sq mi)
- Time zone: UTC+01:00 (CET)
  - Summer (DST): UTC+02:00 (CEST)
- Postal codes: 54608
- Dialling codes: 06555
- Vehicle registration: BIT
- Website: www.buchet.de

Buchet is a municipality in the district of Bitburg-Prüm, in Rhineland-Palatinate, western Germany.
