= Winterscheid =

- Municipality
- Location of Winterscheid within Eifelkreis Bitburg-Prüm district
- Interactive map of Winterscheid
- Location within Germany Location within Rhineland-Palatinate
- Coordinates: 50°13′58″N 6°15′13″E
- Country: Germany
- State: Rhineland-Palatinate
- District: Eifelkreis Bitburg-Prüm
- Municipal assoc.: Prüm

Government
  - Mayor (2019–24): Leo Knauf

Area
  - Total: 8.5 km^{2} (3.3 sq mi)
- Elevation: 470 m (1,540 ft)

Population (2025-12-31)
  - Total: 139
  - Density: 16/km^{2} (42/sq mi)
- Time zone: UTC+01:00 (CET)
  - Summer (DST): UTC+02:00 (CEST)
- Postal codes: 54608
- Dialling codes: 06555
- Vehicle registration: BIT
- Website: Winterscheid at website www.pruem.de

Winterscheid (German pronunciation: [ˈvɪntɐˌʃaɪ̯t]) is a municipality in the district of Bitburg-Prüm, in Rhineland-Palatinate, western Germany.
