= Seiwerath =

- Municipality
- Location of Seiwerath within Eifelkreis Bitburg-Prüm district
- Interactive map of Seiwerath
- Location within Germany Location within Rhineland-Palatinate
- Coordinates: 50°08′54″N 6°30′03″E
- Country: Germany
- State: Rhineland-Palatinate
- District: Eifelkreis Bitburg-Prüm
- Municipal assoc.: Prüm

Government
  - Mayor (2019–24): Michael Schweisthal

Area
  - Total: 8.94 km^{2} (3.45 sq mi)
- Elevation: 545 m (1,788 ft)

Population (2025-12-31)
  - Total: 129
  - Density: 14.4/km^{2} (37.4/sq mi)
- Time zone: UTC+01:00 (CET)
  - Summer (DST): UTC+02:00 (CEST)
- Postal codes: 54597
- Dialling codes: 06553
- Vehicle registration: BIT
- Website: Seiwerath at website www.pruem.de

Seiwerath is a municipality in the district of Bitburg-Prüm, in Rhineland-Palatinate, western Germany. The population of Seiwerath is 139 (as of 2008), the current estimated population of Seiwerath is around 200. with a higher male to female ratio. (56-44)
