= Pittenbach =

- Municipality
- Location of Pittenbach within Eifelkreis Bitburg-Prüm district
- Interactive map of Pittenbach
- Location within Germany Location within Rhineland-Palatinate
- Coordinates: 50°10′30″N 6°20′50″E
- Country: Germany
- State: Rhineland-Palatinate
- District: Eifelkreis Bitburg-Prüm
- Municipal assoc.: Prüm

Government
  - Mayor (2019–24): Günter Theis

Area
  - Total: 3.85 km^{2} (1.49 sq mi)
- Elevation: 390 m (1,280 ft)

Population (2025-12-31)
  - Total: 110
  - Density: 29/km^{2} (74/sq mi)
- Time zone: UTC+01:00 (CET)
  - Summer (DST): UTC+02:00 (CEST)
- Postal codes: 54595
- Dialling codes: 06556
- Vehicle registration: BIT
- Website: Pittenbach at website www.pruem.de

Pittenbach is a municipality in the district of Bitburg-Prüm, in Rhineland-Palatinate, western Germany.
