= Sellerich =

- Municipality
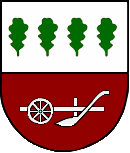
- Coat of arms

- Location of Sellerich within Eifelkreis Bitburg-Prüm district
- Interactive map of Sellerich
- Location within Germany Location within Rhineland-Palatinate
- Coordinates: 50°13′47″N 6°21′57″E
- Country: Germany
- State: Rhineland-Palatinate
- District: Eifelkreis Bitburg-Prüm
- Municipal assoc.: Prüm
- Subdivisions: 4

Government
  - Mayor (2019–24): Herbert Meyer

Area
  - Total: 17.37 km^{2} (6.71 sq mi)
- Elevation: 470 m (1,540 ft)

Population (2025-12-31)
  - Total: 288
  - Density: 16.6/km^{2} (42.9/sq mi)
- Time zone: UTC+01:00 (CET)
  - Summer (DST): UTC+02:00 (CEST)
- Postal codes: 54608
- Dialling codes: 06551
- Vehicle registration: BIT
- Website: Sellerich at website www.pruem.de

Sellerich is a municipality in the district of Bitburg-Prüm, in Rhineland-Palatinate, western Germany.

With a predominantly agricultural structure, Sellerich consists of the districts Sellerich, Hontheim, Herscheid, Sellericher-Höhe and Wohnplatz Schneifelhaus.
