= Kleinlangenfeld =

- Municipality
- Location of Kleinlangenfeld within Eifelkreis Bitburg-Prüm district
- Interactive map of Kleinlangenfeld
- Location within Germany Location within Rhineland-Palatinate
- Coordinates: 50°16′10.17″N 6°28′43.84″E
- Country: Germany
- State: Rhineland-Palatinate
- District: Eifelkreis Bitburg-Prüm
- Municipal assoc.: Prüm

Government
  - Mayor (2019–24): Herbert Hansen

Area
  - Total: 7.82 km^{2} (3.02 sq mi)
- Elevation: 539 m (1,768 ft)

Population (2025-12-31)
  - Total: 145
  - Density: 18.5/km^{2} (48.0/sq mi)
- Time zone: UTC+01:00 (CET)
  - Summer (DST): UTC+02:00 (CEST)
- Postal codes: 54597
- Dialling codes: 06552
- Vehicle registration: BIT
- Website: Kleinlangenfeld at website www.pruem.de

Kleinlangenfeld is a municipality in the district of Bitburg-Prüm, in Rhineland-Palatinate, western Germany.
