= Niederlauch =

- Municipality
- Location of Niederlauch within Eifelkreis Bitburg-Prüm district
- Interactive map of Niederlauch
- Location within Germany Location within Rhineland-Palatinate
- Coordinates: 50°09′43″N 06°25′35″E
- Country: Germany
- State: Rhineland-Palatinate
- District: Eifelkreis Bitburg-Prüm
- Municipal assoc.: Prüm

Government
  - Mayor (2019–24): Alexander Lindemann

Area
  - Total: 0.79 km^{2} (0.31 sq mi)
- Elevation: 480 m (1,570 ft)

Population (2025-12-31)
  - Total: 32
  - Density: 41/km^{2} (100/sq mi)
- Time zone: UTC+01:00 (CET)
  - Summer (DST): UTC+02:00 (CEST)
- Postal codes: 54614
- Dialling codes: 06553
- Vehicle registration: BIT
- Website: Niederlauch at website www.pruem.de

Niederlauch is a municipality in the district of Bitburg-Prüm, in Rhineland-Palatinate, western Germany.
