= Gondenbrett =

- Municipality
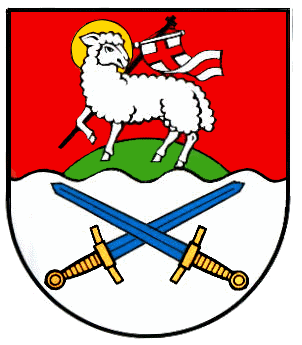
- Coat of arms

- Location of Gondenbrett within Eifelkreis Bitburg-Prüm district
- Interactive map of Gondenbrett
- Location within Germany Location within Rhineland-Palatinate
- Coordinates: 50°14′08″N 6°24′53″E
- Country: Germany
- State: Rhineland-Palatinate
- District: Eifelkreis Bitburg-Prüm
- Municipal assoc.: Prüm

Government
  - Mayor (2019–24): Klaus Nägel

Area
  - Total: 23.05 km^{2} (8.90 sq mi)
- Elevation: 450 m (1,480 ft)

Population (2025-12-31)
  - Total: 490
  - Density: 21/km^{2} (55/sq mi)
- Time zone: UTC+01:00 (CET)
  - Summer (DST): UTC+02:00 (CEST)
- Postal codes: 54595
- Dialling codes: 06551, 06552
- Vehicle registration: BIT
- Website: Gondenbrett at website www.pruem.de

Gondenbrett is a municipality in the district of Bitburg-Prüm, in Rhineland-Palatinate, western Germany.
