= Prüm (Verbandsgemeinde) =

- Verbandsgemeinde
- Location of Prüm within Bitburg-Prüm district
- Interactive map of Prüm
- Location within Germany Location within Rhineland-Palatinate
- Coordinates: 50°13′N 6°25′E
- Country: Germany
- State: Rhineland-Palatinate
- District: Bitburg-Prüm
- Seat: Prüm
- Subdivisions: 44 municipalities

Area
  - Total: 465.58 km^{2} (179.76 sq mi)

Population (2025-12-31)
  - Total: 21,350
  - Density: 45.86/km^{2} (118.8/sq mi)
- Time zone: UTC+01:00 (CET)
  - Summer (DST): UTC+02:00 (CEST)
- Website: www.pruem.de

Prüm is a Verbandsgemeinde ("collective municipality") in the district Bitburg-Prüm, in Rhineland-Palatinate, Germany. The seat of the Verbandsgemeinde is in Prüm.

The Verbandsgemeinde Prüm consists of the following Ortsgemeinden ("local municipalities"):

1. Auw bei Prüm
2. Bleialf
3. Brandscheid
4. Buchet
5. Büdesheim
6. Dingdorf
7. Feuerscheid
8. Fleringen
9. Giesdorf
10. Gondenbrett
11. Großlangenfeld
12. Habscheid
13. Heckhuscheid
14. Heisdorf
15. Hersdorf
16. Kleinlangenfeld
17. Lasel
18. Masthorn
19. Matzerath
20. Mützenich
21. Neuendorf
22. Niederlauch
23. Nimshuscheid
24. Nimsreuland
25. Oberlascheid
26. Oberlauch
27. Olzheim
28. Orlenbach
29. Pittenbach
30. Pronsfeld
31. Prüm
32. Rommersheim
33. Roth bei Prüm
34. Schönecken
35. Schwirzheim
36. Seiwerath
37. Sellerich
38. Wallersheim
39. Watzerath
40. Wawern
41. Weinsheim
42. Winringen
43. Winterscheid
44. Winterspelt
