= Orlenbach =

- Municipality
- Coat of arms

- Location of Orlenbach within Eifelkreis Bitburg-Prüm district
- Interactive map of Orlenbach
- Location within Germany Location within Rhineland-Palatinate
- Coordinates: 50°09′28″N 6°23′01″E
- Country: Germany
- State: Rhineland-Palatinate
- District: Eifelkreis Bitburg-Prüm
- Municipal assoc.: Prüm

Government
  - Mayor (2019–24): Matthias Maas

Area
  - Total: 6.22 km^{2} (2.40 sq mi)
- Elevation: 450 m (1,480 ft)

Population (2025-12-31)
  - Total: 252
  - Density: 40.5/km^{2} (105/sq mi)
- Time zone: UTC+01:00 (CET)
  - Summer (DST): UTC+02:00 (CEST)
- Postal codes: 54595
- Dialling codes: 06556
- Vehicle registration: BIT
- Website: Orlenbach at website www.pruem.de

Orlenbach is a municipality in the district of Bitburg-Prüm, in Rhineland-Palatinate, western Germany.
