= Matzerath =

- Municipality
- Location of Matzerath within Eifelkreis Bitburg-Prüm district
- Interactive map of Matzerath
- Location within Germany Location within Rhineland-Palatinate
- Coordinates: 50°08′50″N 06°22′43″E
- Country: Germany
- State: Rhineland-Palatinate
- District: Eifelkreis Bitburg-Prüm
- Municipal assoc.: Prüm

Government
  - Mayor (2019–24): Roland Pütz

Area
  - Total: 4.31 km^{2} (1.66 sq mi)
- Elevation: 440 m (1,440 ft)

Population (2025-12-31)
  - Total: 48
  - Density: 11/km^{2} (29/sq mi)
- Time zone: UTC+01:00 (CET)
  - Summer (DST): UTC+02:00 (CEST)
- Postal codes: 54597
- Dialling codes: 06556
- Vehicle registration: BIT
- Website: Matzerath at website www.pruem.de

Matzerath is a municipality in the district of Bitburg-Prüm, in Rhineland-Palatinate, western Germany.
