= Nimsreuland =

- Municipality
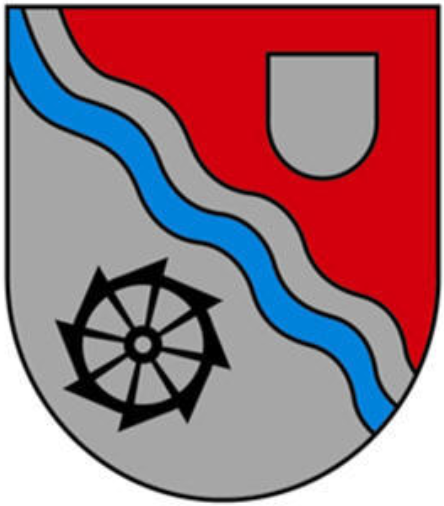
- Coat of arms

- Location of Nimsreuland within Eifelkreis Bitburg-Prüm district
- Interactive map of Nimsreuland
- Location within Germany Location within Rhineland-Palatinate
- Coordinates: 50°07′50″N 6°27′06″E
- Country: Germany
- State: Rhineland-Palatinate
- District: Eifelkreis Bitburg-Prüm
- Municipal assoc.: Prüm

Government
  - Mayor (2019–24): Ewald Breuer

Area
  - Total: 4.43 km^{2} (1.71 sq mi)
- Elevation: 372 m (1,220 ft)

Population (2025-12-31)
  - Total: 88
  - Density: 20/km^{2} (51/sq mi)
- Time zone: UTC+01:00 (CET)
  - Summer (DST): UTC+02:00 (CEST)
- Postal codes: 54614
- Dialling codes: 06553
- Vehicle registration: BIT
- Website: www.nimsreuland.de

Nimsreuland is a municipality in the district of Bitburg-Prüm, in Rhineland-Palatinate, western Germany.
