= Hardtkopf (Elbenberg) =

Coordinates: 51°13′33″N 09°12′37″E

Highest point
- Elevation: 363.8 m (1,194 ft)

Geography
- Location: Hesse, Germany

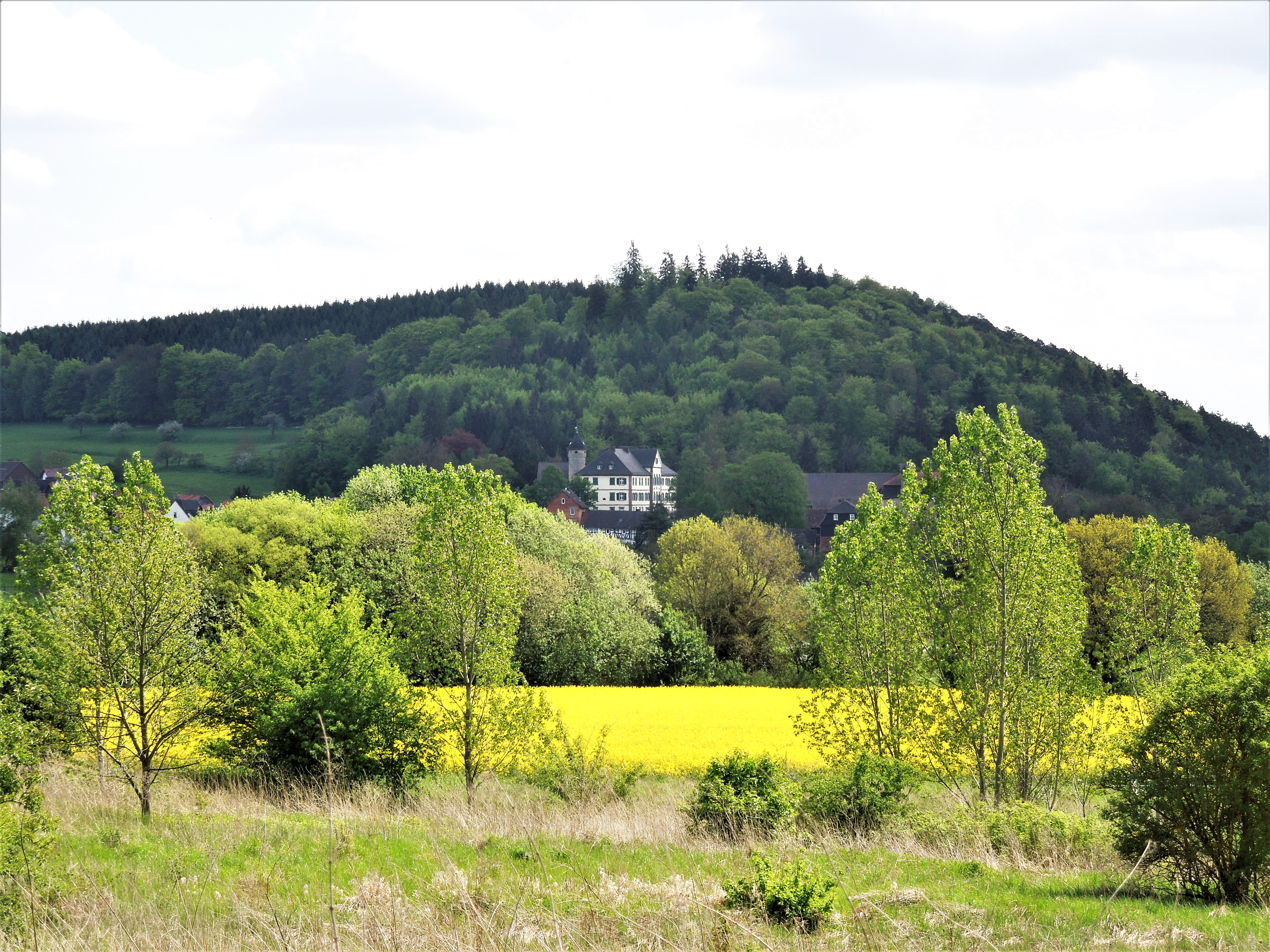
Schloss, Elderberg Countryside

Hardtkopf is a hill of Hesse, Germany.
