= Bickendorf =

- Municipality
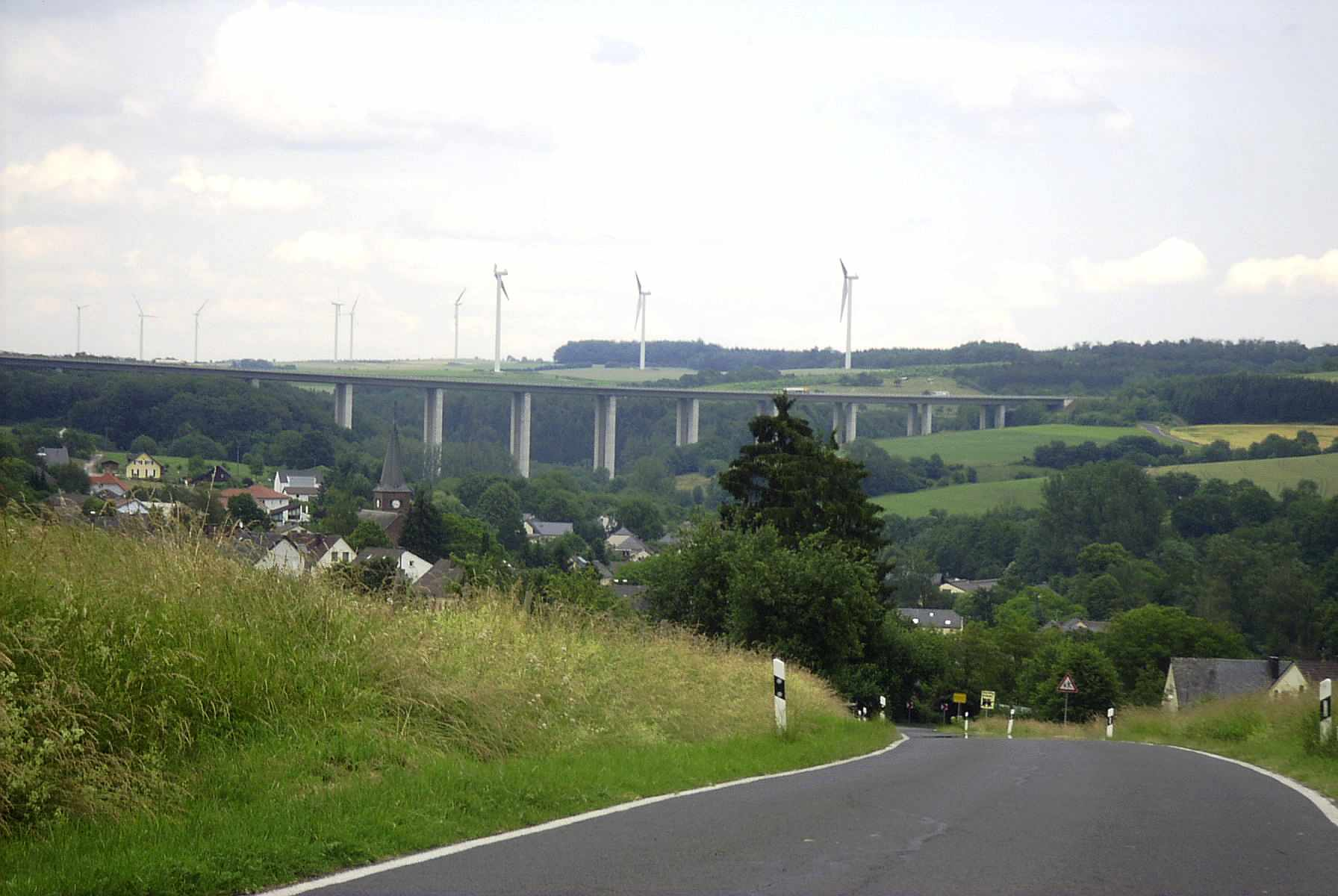

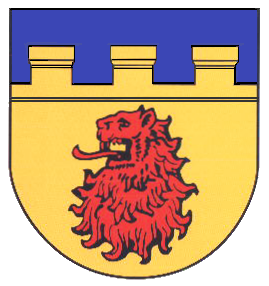
- Coat of arms

- Location of Bickendorf within Eifelkreis Bitburg-Prüm district
- Interactive map of Bickendorf
- Location within Germany Location within Rhineland-Palatinate
- Coordinates: 50°2′04″N 6°30′00″E
- Country: Germany
- State: Rhineland-Palatinate
- District: Eifelkreis Bitburg-Prüm
- Municipal assoc.: Bitburger Land

Government
  - Mayor (2019–24): Dietmar Tures

Area
  - Total: 5.49 km^{2} (2.12 sq mi)
- Elevation: 299 m (981 ft)

Population (2025-12-31)
  - Total: 547
  - Density: 99.6/km^{2} (258/sq mi)
- Time zone: UTC+01:00 (CET)
  - Summer (DST): UTC+02:00 (CEST)
- Postal codes: 54636
- Dialling codes: 06569
- Vehicle registration: BIT
- Website: www.bickendorf.org

Bickendorf is a municipality in the district of Bitburg-Prüm, in Rhineland-Palatinate, western Germany.
