= Mützenich (bei Prüm) =

- Municipality
- Location of Mützenich within Eifelkreis Bitburg-Prüm district
- Interactive map of Mützenich
- Location within Germany Location within Rhineland-Palatinate
- Coordinates: 50°15′12″N 6°15′37″E
- Country: Germany
- State: Rhineland-Palatinate
- District: Eifelkreis Bitburg-Prüm
- Municipal assoc.: Prüm

Government
  - Mayor (2019–24): Dieter Hansen

Area
  - Total: 6.43 km^{2} (2.48 sq mi)
- Elevation: 480–550 m (1,570–1,800 ft)

Population (2025-12-31)
  - Total: 118
  - Density: 18.4/km^{2} (47.5/sq mi)
- Time zone: UTC+01:00 (CET)
  - Summer (DST): UTC+02:00 (CEST)
- Postal codes: 54608
- Dialling codes: 06555
- Vehicle registration: BIT
- Website: Mützenich at website www.pruem.de

Mützenich, also known as Mützenich bei Prüm, is a municipality in the district of Bitburg-Prüm, in Rhineland-Palatinate, western Germany.
