= Hersdorf =

- Municipality
- Location of Hersdorf within Eifelkreis Bitburg-Prüm district
- Interactive map of Hersdorf
- Location within Germany Location within Rhineland-Palatinate
- Coordinates: 50°10′15.84″N 6°30′28.49″E
- Country: Germany
- State: Rhineland-Palatinate
- District: Eifelkreis Bitburg-Prüm
- Municipal assoc.: Prüm

Government
  - Mayor (2023–24): Karl Hansen

Area
  - Total: 12.86 km^{2} (4.97 sq mi)
- Elevation: 500 m (1,600 ft)

Population (2025-12-31)
  - Total: 415
  - Density: 32.3/km^{2} (83.6/sq mi)
- Time zone: UTC+01:00 (CET)
  - Summer (DST): UTC+02:00 (CEST)
- Postal codes: 54597
- Dialling codes: 06553
- Vehicle registration: BIT
- Website: www.hersdorf-eifel.de

Hersdorf is a municipality in the district of Bitburg-Prüm, in Rhineland-Palatinate, western Germany.
