= Büdesheim =

- Municipality
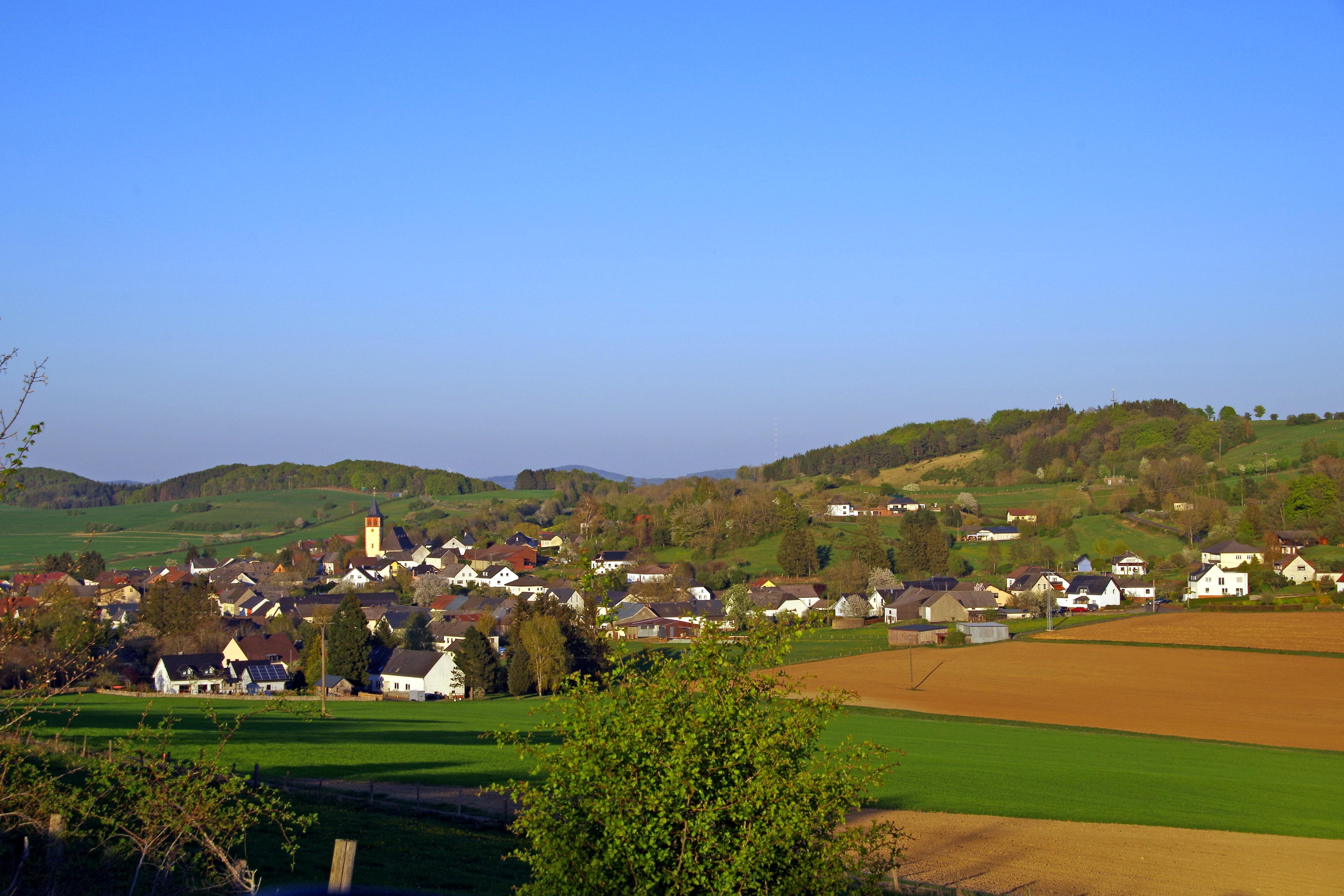
- Büdesheim seen from the southwest

- Coat of arms

- Location of Büdesheim within Eifelkreis Bitburg-Prüm district
- Interactive map of Büdesheim
- Location within Germany Location within Rhineland-Palatinate
- Coordinates: 50°13′N 6°33′E
- Country: Germany
- State: Rhineland-Palatinate
- District: Eifelkreis Bitburg-Prüm
- Municipal assoc.: Prüm

Government
  - Mayor (2019–24): Walter Post

Area
  - Total: 13.64 km^{2} (5.27 sq mi)
- Elevation: 500 m (1,600 ft)

Population (2025-12-31)
  - Total: 564
  - Density: 41.3/km^{2} (107/sq mi)
- Time zone: UTC+01:00 (CET)
  - Summer (DST): UTC+02:00 (CEST)
- Postal codes: 54610
- Dialling codes: 06558
- Vehicle registration: BIT
- Website: www.buedesheim-eifel.de

Büdesheim (German pronunciation: [ˈbyːdəshaɪm]) is a municipality in the district of Bitburg-Prüm, in Rhineland-Palatinate, western Germany.
