= Oberlauch =

- Municipality
- Location of Oberlauch within Eifelkreis Bitburg-Prüm district
- Interactive map of Oberlauch
- Location within Germany Location within Rhineland-Palatinate
- Coordinates: 50°10′06″N 6°25′22″E
- Country: Germany
- State: Rhineland-Palatinate
- District: Eifelkreis Bitburg-Prüm
- Municipal assoc.: Prüm

Government
  - Mayor (2019–24): Arno Meyer

Area
  - Total: 3.59 km^{2} (1.39 sq mi)
- Elevation: 530 m (1,740 ft)

Population (2025-12-31)
  - Total: 75
  - Density: 21/km^{2} (54/sq mi)
- Time zone: UTC+01:00 (CET)
  - Summer (DST): UTC+02:00 (CEST)
- Postal codes: 54614
- Dialling codes: 06553
- Vehicle registration: BIT
- Website: Oberlauch at website www.pruem.de

Oberlauch is a municipality in the district of Bitburg-Prüm, in Rhineland-Palatinate, western Germany.
