= Gondelsheim (Weinsheim) =

- Ortsteil of Weinsheim
- Interactive map of Gondelsheim
- Location within Germany Location within Rhineland-Palatinate
- Coordinates: 50°14′02″N 6°30′04″E
- Country: Germany
- State: Rhineland-Palatinate
- Municipality: Weinsheim
- Elevation: 545 m (1,788 ft)

Population (2014)
  - Total: 223
- Time zone: UTC+01:00 (CET)
  - Summer (DST): UTC+02:00 (CEST)
- Postal codes: 54595
- Dialling codes: 06558

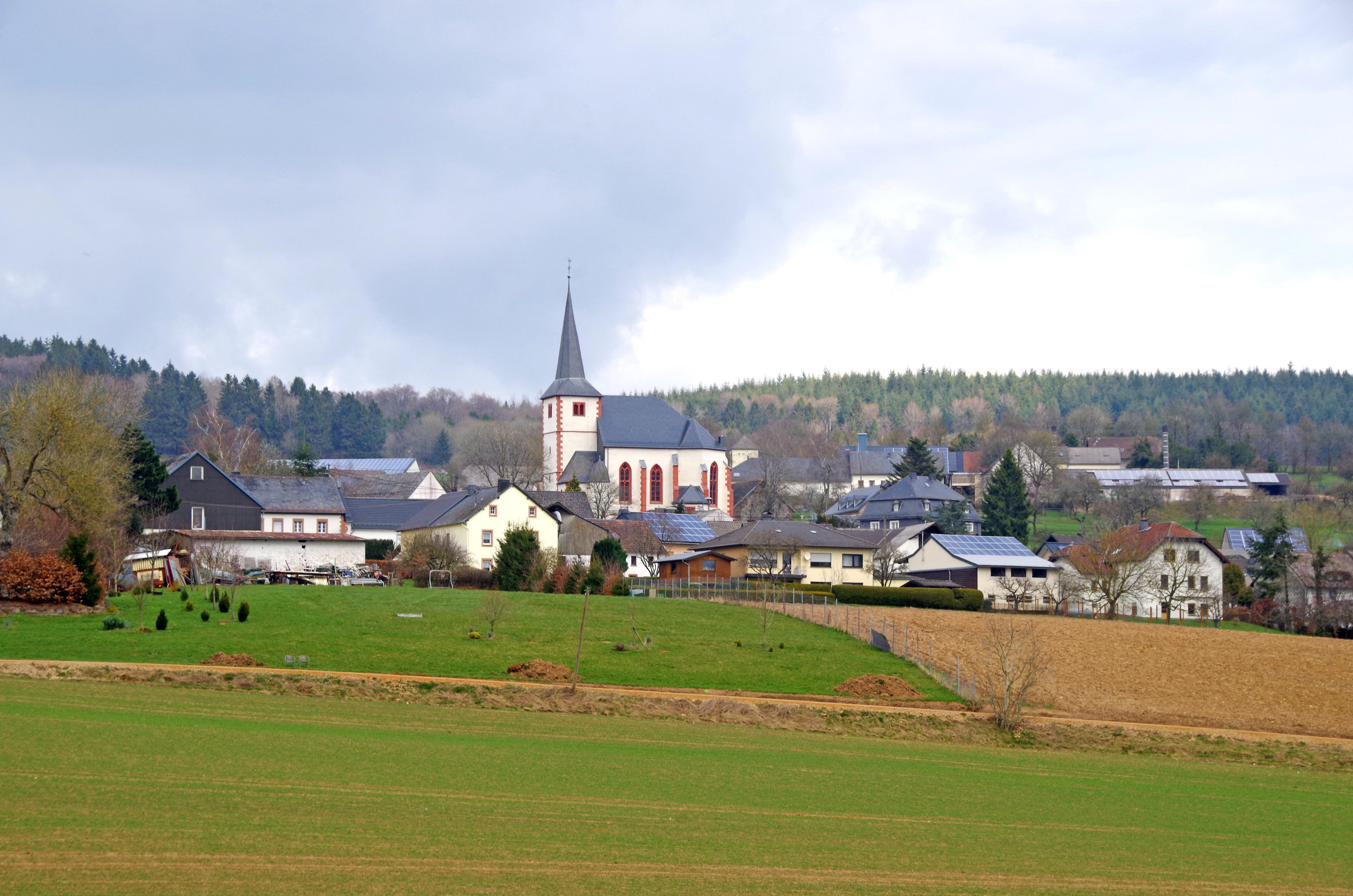

Gondelsheim is a village (Ortsteil) in the municipality of Weinsheim in the county of Bitburg-Prüm in the German state of Rhineland-Palatinate.

== Location ==
Gondelsheim lies in the valley of the Vlierbach stream, which flows past the village to the south. To the north rises the Seimersberg hill. The main roads through the village are the Kreisstrassen K 172 and K 178. Neighbouring villages are Schwirzheim to the east, Baselt to the south and Weinsheim to the west.

== History ==
In 1988 scattered pieces of Roman pottery were found south of Gondelsheim dating to the 2nd and 4th centuries AD indicating that the area was already settled by that time.

On 1 January 1971 the hitherto independent municipality of Gondelsheim was incorporated into Weinsheim.

== Sights ==
- Roman Catholic parish and pilgrimage church of St. Fides, built in the 15th century

== Clubs ==
- Freiwillige Feuerwehr Gondelsheim (volunteer fire service)
- Chorgemeinschaft Büdesheim-Gondelsheim-Schwirzheim (choir)
- Karneval Gondelsheim (carnival)

== Population ==
Year	Population
1933	181
1939	186
2014	223
