= Lasel =

- Municipality
- Coat of arms

- Location of Lasel within Eifelkreis Bitburg-Prüm district
- Interactive map of Lasel
- Location within Germany Location within Rhineland-Palatinate
- Coordinates: 50°06′46″N 6°28′03″E
- Country: Germany
- State: Rhineland-Palatinate
- District: Eifelkreis Bitburg-Prüm
- Municipal assoc.: Prüm

Government
  - Mayor (2019–24): Manfred Klasen

Area
  - Total: 4.51 km^{2} (1.74 sq mi)
- Elevation: 336 m (1,102 ft)

Population (2025-12-31)
  - Total: 296
  - Density: 65.6/km^{2} (170/sq mi)
- Time zone: UTC+01:00 (CET)
  - Summer (DST): UTC+02:00 (CEST)
- Postal codes: 54612
- Dialling codes: 06553
- Vehicle registration: BIT
- Website: Lasel at website www.pruem.de

Lasel is a municipality in the district of Bitburg-Prüm, in Rhineland-Palatinate, western Germany.
