= Sefferweich =

- Municipality
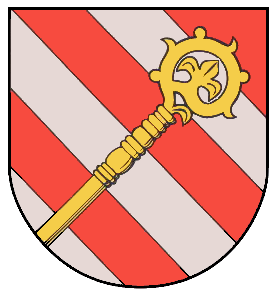
- Coat of arms

- Location of Sefferweich within Eifelkreis Bitburg-Prüm district
- Interactive map of Sefferweich
- Location within Germany Location within Rhineland-Palatinate
- Coordinates: 50°03′40″N 6°31′21″E
- Country: Germany
- State: Rhineland-Palatinate
- District: Eifelkreis Bitburg-Prüm
- Municipal assoc.: Bitburger Land

Government
  - Mayor (2019–24): Gerd Wirz

Area
  - Total: 10.70 km^{2} (4.13 sq mi)
- Elevation: 400 m (1,300 ft)

Population (2025-12-31)
  - Total: 265
  - Density: 24.8/km^{2} (64.1/sq mi)
- Time zone: UTC+01:00 (CET)
  - Summer (DST): UTC+02:00 (CEST)
- Postal codes: 54636
- Dialling codes: 06569
- Vehicle registration: BIT
- Website: Sefferweich at the Bitburger Land website www.bitburgerland.de

Sefferweich is a municipality in the district of Bitburg-Prüm, in Rhineland-Palatinate, western Germany.
