= Dingdorf =

Municipality in Germany

- Municipality
- Location of Dingdorf within Eifelkreis Bitburg-Prüm district
- Interactive map of Dingdorf
- Location within Germany Location within Rhineland-Palatinate
- Coordinates: 50°9′1.23″N 6°26′11.23″E
- Country: Germany
- State: Rhineland-Palatinate
- District: Eifelkreis Bitburg-Prüm
- Municipal assoc.: Prüm

Government
  - Mayor (2019–24): Stefan Marxen

Area
  - Total: 3.81 km^{2} (1.47 sq mi)
- Elevation: 403 m (1,322 ft)

Population (2025-12-31)
  - Total: 111
  - Density: 29.1/km^{2} (75.5/sq mi)
- Time zone: UTC+01:00 (CET)
  - Summer (DST): UTC+02:00 (CEST)
- Postal codes: 54614
- Dialling codes: 06553
- Vehicle registration: BIT
- Website: Dingdorf at website www.pruem.de

Dingdorf is a municipality in the district of Bitburg-Prüm, in Rhineland-Palatinate, western Germany.
