= Nattenheim =

- Municipality
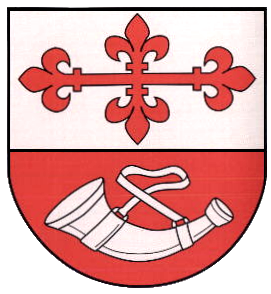
- Coat of arms

- Location of Nattenheim within Eifelkreis Bitburg-Prüm district
- Interactive map of Nattenheim
- Location within Germany Location within Rhineland-Palatinate
- Coordinates: 50°01′17″N 6°31′09″E
- Country: Germany
- State: Rhineland-Palatinate
- District: Eifelkreis Bitburg-Prüm
- Municipal assoc.: Bitburger Land

Government
  - Mayor (2019–24): Klaus Dichter

Area
  - Total: 6.93 km^{2} (2.68 sq mi)
- Elevation: 375 m (1,230 ft)

Population (2025-12-31)
  - Total: 562
  - Density: 81.1/km^{2} (210/sq mi)
- Time zone: UTC+01:00 (CET)
  - Summer (DST): UTC+02:00 (CEST)
- Postal codes: 54636
- Dialling codes: 06569
- Vehicle registration: BIT
- Website: Nattenheim at the Bitburger Land website www.bitburgerland.de

Nattenheim is a municipality in the district of Bitburg-Prüm, in Rhineland-Palatinate, western Germany.

It is located 8 km north of Bitburg, 38 km north of Trier, and 37 km east of the German border with Luxembourg.
