= Giesdorf =

- Municipality
- Location of Giesdorf within Eifelkreis Bitburg-Prüm district
- Interactive map of Giesdorf
- Location within Germany Location within Rhineland-Palatinate
- Coordinates: 50°10′44.59″N 6°26′57.51″E
- Country: Germany
- State: Rhineland-Palatinate
- District: Eifelkreis Bitburg-Prüm
- Municipal assoc.: Prüm

Government
  - Mayor (2019–24): Mario Merkes

Area
  - Total: 3.56 km^{2} (1.37 sq mi)
- Elevation: 421 m (1,381 ft)

Population (2025-12-31)
  - Total: 118
  - Density: 33.1/km^{2} (85.8/sq mi)
- Time zone: UTC+01:00 (CET)
  - Summer (DST): UTC+02:00 (CEST)
- Postal codes: 54614
- Dialling codes: 06551, 06553
- Vehicle registration: BIT
- Website: Giesdorf at website www.pruem.de

Giesdorf is a municipality in the district of Bitburg-Prüm, in Rhineland-Palatinate, western Germany.
