= Weinsheim, Bitburg-Prüm =

Weinsheim
- Municipality
- Location of Weinsheim within Eifelkreis Bitburg-Prüm district
- Interactive map of Weinsheim
- Location within Germany Location within Rhineland-Palatinate
- Coordinates: 50°13′56″N 6°28′21″E
- Country: Germany
- State: Rhineland-Palatinate
- District: Eifelkreis Bitburg-Prüm
- Municipal assoc.: Prüm
- Subdivisions: 4

Government
  - Mayor (2019–24): Peter Meyer

Area
  - Total: 24.07 km^{2} (9.29 sq mi)
- Elevation: 545 m (1,788 ft)

Population (2025-12-31)
  - Total: 1,042
  - Density: 43.29/km^{2} (112.1/sq mi)
- Time zone: UTC+01:00 (CET)
  - Summer (DST): UTC+02:00 (CEST)
- Postal codes: 54595
- Dialling codes: 06551, 06558
- Vehicle registration: BIT
- Website: www.weinsheim-eifel.de

Weinsheim (German pronunciation: [ˈvaɪnshaɪm]) is a municipality in the district of Bitburg-Prüm, in Rhineland-Palatinate, western Germany.

== Geography ==
Weinsheim lies in the West Eifel, on the northwestern edge of the Prüm syncline.

The municipality is divided into four parishes (population as at 2014):

Parish	Population
Gondelsheim	223
Hermespand	177
Weinsheim	532
Willwerath	158
