= South Eifel =

Coordinates: 49.9372°N 6.6381°E

The South Eifel (German: Südeifel) refers to that part of the Eifel mountain region around the Bitburg-Prüm district in the German state of Rhineland-Palatinate.

It is bordered to the south and southeast by the river Moselle, to the northwest by the Schnee Eifel and the northeast by the Volcanic Eifel.

The cross-border German-Luxembourg Nature Park lies within the South Eifel. In the village of Bollendorf is the South Eifel Youth Hostel.

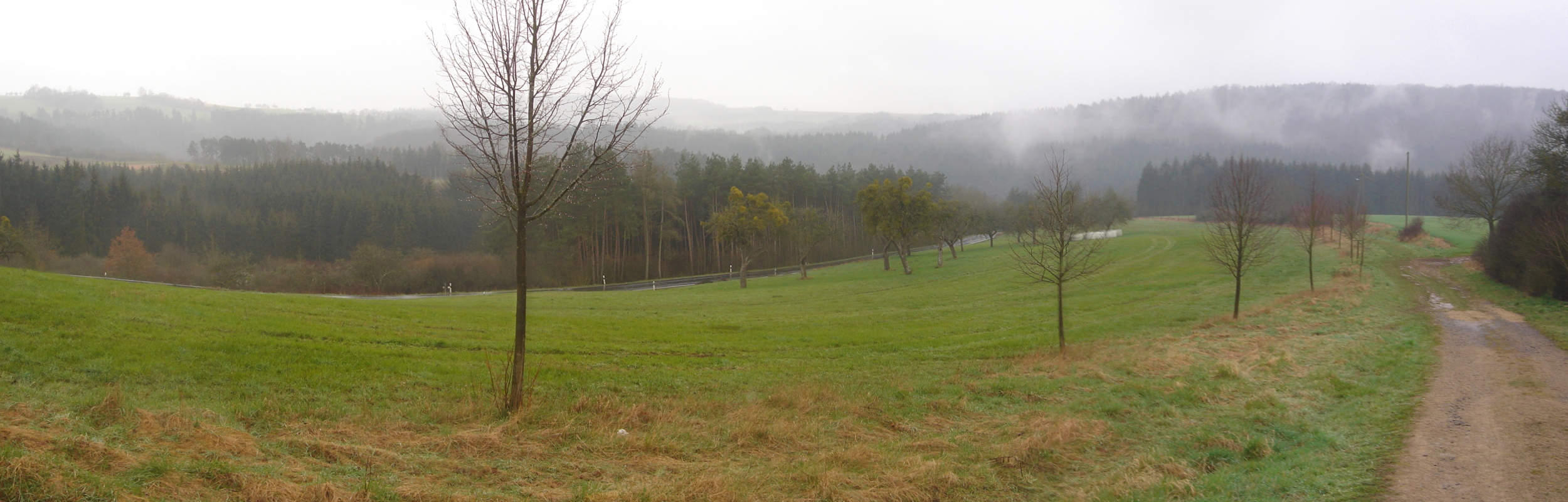
Typical South Eifel landscape at Speicher near Bitburg

== See also ==
- Eifel
- North Eifel
- West Eifel
- East Eifel
- Schnee Eifel
- Schneifel
- Rur Eifel
- Volcanic Eifel
