= Nimshuscheid =

- Municipality
- Location of Nimshuscheid within Eifelkreis Bitburg-Prüm district
- Interactive map of Nimshuscheid
- Location within Germany Location within Rhineland-Palatinate
- Coordinates: 50°06′03″N 06°29′31″E
- Country: Germany
- State: Rhineland-Palatinate
- District: Eifelkreis Bitburg-Prüm
- Municipal assoc.: Prüm

Government
  - Mayor (2019–24): Harald Trappen

Area
  - Total: 5.06 km^{2} (1.95 sq mi)
- Elevation: 430 m (1,410 ft)

Population (2025-12-31)
  - Total: 243
  - Density: 48.0/km^{2} (124/sq mi)
- Time zone: UTC+01:00 (CET)
  - Summer (DST): UTC+02:00 (CEST)
- Postal codes: 54612
- Dialling codes: 06553
- Vehicle registration: BIT
- Website: Nimshuscheid at website www.pruem.de

Nimshuscheid is a municipality in the district of Bitburg-Prüm, in Rhineland-Palatinate, western Germany.
