= Seffern =

- Municipality
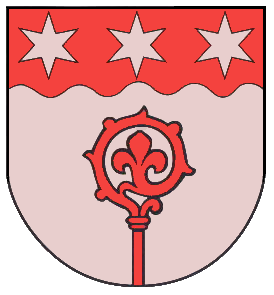
- Coat of arms

- Location of Seffern within Eifelkreis Bitburg-Prüm district
- Interactive map of Seffern
- Location within Germany Location within Rhineland-Palatinate
- Coordinates: 50°03′53″N 6°30′15″E
- Country: Germany
- State: Rhineland-Palatinate
- District: Eifelkreis Bitburg-Prüm
- Municipal assoc.: Bitburger Land

Government
  - Mayor (2019–24): Michael Müller

Area
  - Total: 4.92 km^{2} (1.90 sq mi)
- Elevation: 370 m (1,210 ft)

Population (2025-12-31)
  - Total: 281
  - Density: 57.1/km^{2} (148/sq mi)
- Time zone: UTC+01:00 (CET)
  - Summer (DST): UTC+02:00 (CEST)
- Postal codes: 54636
- Dialling codes: 06569
- Vehicle registration: BIT
- Website: Seffern at the Bitburger Land website www.bitburgerland.de

Seffern is a municipality in the district of Bitburg-Prüm, in Rhineland-Palatinate, Germany.
