= Schönecken =

- Municipality
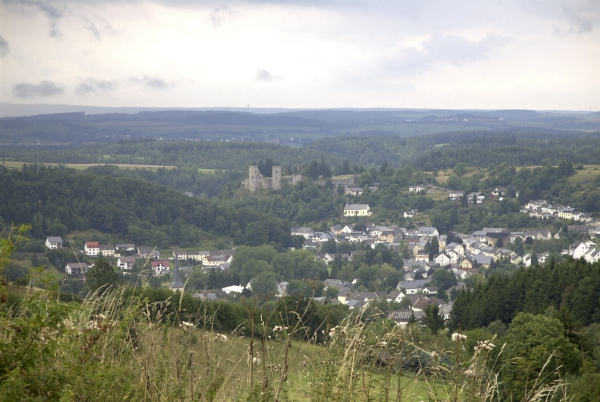
- Schönecken with Schönecken Castle in the background

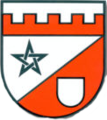
- Coat of arms

- Location of Schönecken within Eifelkreis Bitburg-Prüm district
- Interactive map of Schönecken
- Location within Germany Location within Rhineland-Palatinate
- Coordinates: 50°9′20″N 6°27′56″E
- Country: Germany
- State: Rhineland-Palatinate
- District: Eifelkreis Bitburg-Prüm
- Municipal assoc.: Prüm

Government
  - Mayor (2019–24): Johannes Arenth (CDU)

Area
  - Total: 13.35 km^{2} (5.15 sq mi)
- Elevation: 400–550 m (1,310–1,800 ft)

Population (2025-12-31)
  - Total: 1,434
  - Density: 107.4/km^{2} (278.2/sq mi)
- Time zone: UTC+01:00 (CET)
  - Summer (DST): UTC+02:00 (CEST)
- Postal codes: 54614
- Dialling codes: 06553
- Vehicle registration: BIT
- Website: www.schoenecken.de

Schönecken is a municipality in the district of Bitburg-Prüm, in Rhineland-Palatinate, western Germany.
