= Rommersheim =

- Municipality
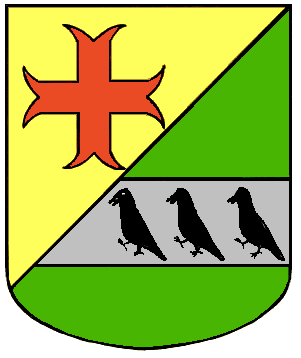
- Coat of arms

- Location of Rommersheim within Eifelkreis Bitburg-Prüm district
- Interactive map of Rommersheim
- Location within Germany Location within Rhineland-Palatinate
- Coordinates: 50°11′37″N 6°26′42″E
- Country: Germany
- State: Rhineland-Palatinate
- District: Eifelkreis Bitburg-Prüm
- Municipal assoc.: Prüm

Government
  - Mayor (2019–24): Helmut Nober

Area
  - Total: 16.97 km^{2} (6.55 sq mi)
- Elevation: 440–480 m (1,440–1,570 ft)

Population (2025-12-31)
  - Total: 660
  - Density: 39/km^{2} (100/sq mi)
- Time zone: UTC+01:00 (CET)
  - Summer (DST): UTC+02:00 (CEST)
- Postal codes: 54597
- Dialling codes: 06551
- Vehicle registration: BIT
- Website: www.rommersheim.de

Rommersheim is a municipality in the district of Bitburg-Prüm, in Rhineland-Palatinate, western Germany.
