= Obergeckler =

- Municipality
- Location of Obergeckler within Eifelkreis Bitburg-Prüm district
- Interactive map of Obergeckler
- Location within Germany Location within Rhineland-Palatinate
- Coordinates: 49°58′29″N 6°17′34″E
- Country: Germany
- State: Rhineland-Palatinate
- District: Eifelkreis Bitburg-Prüm
- Municipal assoc.: Südeifel

Government
  - Mayor (2019–24): Josef Streit

Area
  - Total: 7.75 km^{2} (2.99 sq mi)
- Elevation: 400 m (1,300 ft)

Population (2025-12-31)
  - Total: 196
  - Density: 25.3/km^{2} (65.5/sq mi)
- Time zone: UTC+01:00 (CET)
  - Summer (DST): UTC+02:00 (CEST)
- Postal codes: 54675
- Dialling codes: 06522
- Vehicle registration: BIT
- Website: Obergeckler at site www.suedeifelinfo.de

Obergeckler is a municipality in the district of Bitburg-Prüm, in Rhineland-Palatinate, western Germany. On 1 January 2025, the former municipality Niedergeckler was merged into Obergeckler.
