= Niedergeckler =

- Ortsteil of Obergeckler
- Interactive map of Niedergeckler
- Location within Germany Location within Rhineland-Palatinate
- Coordinates: 49°58′11″N 06°18′18″E
- Country: Germany
- State: Rhineland-Palatinate
- District: Eifelkreis Bitburg-Prüm
- Municipality: Obergeckler

Area
  - Total: 1.39 km^{2} (0.54 sq mi)
- Elevation: 346 m (1,135 ft)

Population (2023-12-31)
  - Total: 54
  - Density: 39/km^{2} (100/sq mi)
- Time zone: UTC+01:00 (CET)
  - Summer (DST): UTC+02:00 (CEST)
- Postal codes: 54675
- Dialling codes: 06522
- Vehicle registration: BIT
- Website: Niedergeckler at site www.suedeifelinfo.de

Niedergeckler is a village and a former municipality in the district of Bitburg-Prüm, in Rhineland-Palatinate, western Germany. Since 1 January 2025, it is part of the municipality Obergeckler.
