= List of castles in the Eifel =

This is a list of castles, fortifications and schlösser in the Eifel mountains covering the period from the Celts to the Early Modern Period. The list covers the area bounded by the cities of Aachen, Bonn, Koblenz and Trier, and extends in places into Luxembourg and Belgium.

Legend
- Name: the official name of the structure. Other possible names are given in the relevant articles.
- Location: shows the location by town borough, municipality or country (if Belgium or Luxembourg).
- County/district: AC –Aachen, AW –Ahrweiler, BIT –Bitburg-Prüm, DAU –Vulkaneifel, DN – Düren, EU –Euskirchen, MYK –Mayen-Koblenz
- State: federal German state: NRW (North Rhine-Westphalia), RP (Rhineland-Palatinate), but also B (Belgium), L (Luxembourg)
- Type: gives the type of building: for castles usually based on the topographical location; Schlösser are, where possible, divided into e.g. residences, hunting lodges or palaces.
- Built: shows (if known) when the structure was built. For castles usually only the first record or dating by epoch according to architectural style.
- Preservation state and present use: describes the current state of the building. A ‘lost’ castle is one where there are no surviving remains, a ‘’burgstall’’ is a castle with no above ground remains. It is also annotated if the building is in private ownership or not accessible.
- Image: shows, if possible, a photograph, picture or drawing of the structure, ruins or ‘’burgstall’’. Often only later buildings may be documented.

Shem

| Name | Location | County/District | State | Type | Built | Preservation state and present use | Image |
|---|---|---|---|---|---|---|---|
| Monschau Castle | Monschau | AC | NRW | Hill castle | 13th century | Largely preserved, today youth hostel, old people's home | |
| Haller | Monschau | AC | NRW | Hill castle, tower house | Probably 13th century | Ruins | |
| Reichenstein Abbey | Monschau | AC | NRW | Hill castle | 11th century | Nothing has survived, 1131/36 gifted to Premonstratensian order due to its unfavourable strategic location, abbey built over it | |
| Meyssenburg | Huppenbroich | AC | NRW | water castle, motte | Probably 14th century | Only the experienced eye can recognise the remains. | |
| Nideggen Castle | Nideggen | DN | NRW | Hill castle | 1177 | Largely preserved, restaurant, castle museum | |
| Baarsberg, Burgwall | Bongard | DAU | RP | Celtic 60 m long and c. 7 m high defensive bank, cistern | c. 500 BC | Today only gravel heaps, cisterns filled in | Image wanted |
| Nideggen town fortifications | Nideggen | DN | NRW | Town gates, town wall | | Largely preserved | |
| Bourscheid Castle | Burscheid | Canton of Diekirch | L | Hill castle | Around 1000 | Partially survived | |
| Schloss Burgau | Niederau | DN | NRW | Water castle | Before 13th century | Destroyed in the Second World War, rebuilt | |
| Bertradaburg | Mürlenbach | DAU | RP | Hill castle, hill spur site | Early Middle Ages, first recorded in the 13th century | Restored, largely preserved | |
| Burghaus Adenau | Adenau | AW | RP | | | | Image wanted |
| Adenbach Castle | Ahrweiler | AW | RP | Lowland castle, urban location | The castle goes back to a manor house in the late Middle Ages | Became a hotel in the late 1980s | |
| Ahrweiler town fortification | Ahrweiler | AW | RP | | | | |
| Adendorf Castle | Wachtberg | SU | NRW | Water castle, lowland castle | 1655–1670 | Preserved, no public access | |
| Manor house of Altendorf Castle | Altendorf | SU | NRW | Knight's seat | | | |
| Alte Burg | Lommersdorf | EU | NRW | Spur castle | Late Middle Ages | A few remains | Image wanted |
| Alte Burg | Kerpen | DAU | RP | | | | Image wanted |
| Alte Burg | Insul | AW | RP | | | | Image wanted |
| Alte Burg | Reifferscheid | AW | RP | | | | Image wanted |
| Altburg (Altenburg; Burg Altendaun; Alte Burg; Aldenburg; Alteburg; Alt-Dune) | Schalkenmehren | DAU | RP | | | | Image wanted |
| Andernach Castle | Andernach | MYK | RP | | | | |
| Town fortification of Andernach | Andernach | MYK | RP | | | | |
| Burgus | Bodenbach | DAU | RP | | | | Image wanted |
| Altenburg | Blankenheimerdorf | EU | NRW | Lowland castle, motte | 13th century | Partly preserved | Image wanted |
| Zehnbachhaus | Blankenheimerdorf | EU | NRW | Motte | | | Image wanted |
| Austrian defensive line with ‘’schanzen’’ | Blankenheimerdorf | EU | NRW | | | | Image wanted |
| Are Castle | Altenahr | AW | RP | Hill castle | Probably 1100 | Ruins | |
| Aremberg Castle | Aremberg | AW | RP | Hill castle | First mentioned in 1166 | ruins | |
| Haus Amstenrath | Eynatten | Canton of Eupen | B | Water castle | First mentioned in 1430 | Preserved | |
| Arloff Castle | Arloff | EU | NRW | Water castle | Early Gothic | Largely preserved | |
| Arras Castle | Alf | COC | RP | Hill castle | Around 1100 | Considerable elements have survived | |
| Schloss Bassenheim | Bassenheim | MYK | RP | | | | |
| Bodendorf Castle | Bad Bodendorf | AW | RP | Water castle | 13th century | Partly preserved, rebuilt in the 17th century | |
| Coraidelstein Castle | Klotten | COC | RP | Hill castle, hillside location | 960 (disputed) | Ruins | |
| Burghaus Gymnich | Altenahr | AW | RP | Burghaus | Probably 14th century | | Image wanted |
| Münstereifel Castle | Bad Münstereifel | EU | NRW | Hillside castle | 13th/14th century | Considerable elements have survived | |
| Münstereifel town fortifications | Bad Münstereifel | EU | NRW | town wall, towers | Spuren seit der Mittelsteinzeit, erste Siedlungsspuren Jungsteinzeit. | Town wall fully preserved, restored | |
| Berenstein Castle | Bergstein | DN | NRW | Hill castle | 1090 | ’‘Burgstall’’ | |
| Schloss Bekond | Bekond | TR | RP | Water castle | 1635, 1710 expanded | Preserved | Image wanted |
| Castle Bell | Bell | MYK | RP | castellum, fortified farmhouse | 1263 | Partially preserved | Image wanted |
| Bewershof | Nideggen | DN | NRW | Manor house | 17th – 18th century | Preserved | |
| Castle Mechernich | Berg | EU | NRW | Water castle | Around 1200 | Preserved or considerable elements have survived | |
| Bitburg town wall | Bitburg | BIT | RP | town wall: Roman to mediaeval | From the 4th century | Remains | Image wanted |
| Blankenheim Castle | Blankenheim | EU | NRW | Hill castle | 1115 | Considerable elements have survived | |
| Blankenheim valley fortification | Blankenheim | EU | NRW | | | | |
| Schloss Burgbrohl | Castlebrohl | AW | RP | | Destroyed1689, greatly expanded in the 18th century | Preserved | |
| Binningen Castle | Binningen | COC | RP | Castle (?) | !7th century (?) | Remains | Image wanted |
| Bischofstein Castle | Münstermaifeld | MYK | RP | Spur castle | 1273 (older castle) | 1930 new castle built | |
| Blens Castle | Blens | DN | NRW | Hill castle | Around 1100 | Preserved or considerable elements have survived | |
| Bruch Castle | Bruch | WIT | RP | Water castle, lowland castle | 14th century | Considerable elements have survived | |
| Schloss Bürresheim | St. Johann | MYK | RP | Spur castle, upland location | 12th century | in original build state preserved | |
| Settlement defences of Bad Bodendorf | Bad Bodendorf | AW | RP | | | | Image wanted |
| Bollendorf Castle | Bollendorf | BIT | RP | Lowland castle | c. 700 | Considerable elements have survived | |
| Former water castle of Embken | Embken | DN | NRW | Water castle | 16th to 18th century | Remodelled several times, preserved | |
| Lantershofen Castle | Lantershofen | AW | RP | | 1376/1708 | | |
| Pissenheim Castle | Muldenau | DN | NRW | Lowland castle | 1500 roughly | Considerable elements have survived | |
| Burghaus Burgsahr | Kirchsahr | AW | RP | | 17th century | Preserved | |
| Burberg, Roman hillfort | Burberg | DAU | RP | | | | Image wanted |
| Dasburg | Dasburg | BIT | RP | Hill castle | 13th century | Wall remains | |
| Schloss Clerf | Clerf | Canton of Clerf | L | Schlossburg | 12th century or earlier | Largely destroyed by German troops in 1944; rebuilding agreed in 1994 | |
| Cochem Castle | Cochem | COC | RP | Imperial hill castle | Around 1100. Destroyed in the 17th century, rebuilt 1868–1877 | Neogothic style, preserved | |
| Schloss Bracht | Bracht | Canton of St. Vith | B | Schloss | 1782–1785 | Preserved | |
| Town fortification of Cochem | Cochem | COC | RP | | | | |
| Daun Castle with Burgmann houses, courtyard and Waldenhof | Daun | DAU | RP | Hill castle | Around 1000 | Destroyed and rebuilt several, preserved: enceinte, bastion towerlets. It could have been built over a Celtic refuge castle dating to 700 BC | |
| Densborn Castle | Densborn | DAU | RP | Castle | No later than the 13th century | Partially ruined | Image wanted |
| Schloss Dodenburg | Dodenburg | WIT | RP | Water castle, | 16th century, altered in 1891 into the style of the German Renaissance | Preserved | |
| Dohm Castle | Dohm-Lammersdorf | DAU | RP | Castle, possibly a water castle | | Remains of the enceinte | Image wanted |
| Dollendorf Castle | Blankenheim (Ahr) | EU | NRW | Hill castle | Around 893 | Wall and tower remains | |
| Dreiser Burg | Dreis-Brück | DAU | RP | Burghaus | 1579 | Fully preserved and restored, in private ownership, private residences | |
| Dreimühlen Castle | Ahütte | DAU | RP | Hill castle | 13th century | Ruins | |
| Dreiborn Castle | Dreiborn | EU | RP | Water castle | Middle Ages | Preserved | |
| Schloss Dreis | Dreis | WIT | RP | Two-and-a-half storey, multi-winged building | 1774 | | Image wanted |
| Drove Castle | Drove | DN | NRW | Water castle, lowland castle | 1728–1741 | Preserved or considerable elements have survived | |
| Motte near Drove | Drove | DN | NRW | Motte | First mentioned in 13th century | Destroyed 1643 to 1673, demolished in the 19th century today only a motte hill | |
| Dudeldorf Castle | Dudeldorf | BIT | RP | Urban location | 1100–1200 | Considerable elements have survived | |
| Town fortifications of Dudeldorf | Dudeldorf | BIT | RP | Town wall, town gate | 1345 | Partly preserved | |
| Schloss Eicks | Eicks | EU | NRW | Water castle | 1344 | 1365 destroyed, 1680 rebuilt with the old materials | |
| Eltz Castle | Wierschem | MYK | RP | Hill castle | From the 12th century | Fully preserved | |
| Entersburg | Hontheim | WIL | RP | Spur castle | From the 11th century | 1138 destroyed, burgstall, a few remains | Image wanted |
| Eyneburg | Hergenrath | Canton of Eupen | B | Hill castle | First mentioned in 1260 | Preserved | |
| Falkenstein Castle | Waldhof-Falkenstein | BIT | RP | Hill castle, hill spur site | First half of the 12th century | Considerable elements have survived | |
| Firmenich Castle | Firmenich | EU | NRW | Urban location | 1500 to 1600 | Considerable elements have survived | Image wanted |
| Freilingen Castle | Freilingen | DAU | RP | Lowland castle, urban location | 14th century | Demolished, burgstall | Image wanted |
| Roman (Celtic?) refuge castle | Auw an der Kyll | BIT | RP | Between Auw and Priest | | | Image wanted |
| Freudenkoppe | Neroth | DAU | RP | Hill castle | 1337–1340 | Ruins | |
| Freudenstein Castle | Brockscheid | DAU | RP | | 1340 | The foundations may be found halfway to Liesertal | Image wanted |
| Schloss Föhren | Föhren | TR | RP | Castle | 1340, converted in 1663 | Preserved | |
| Schloss Gelsdorf | Gelsdorf | AW | NRW | Schloss | 13th century, schloss since 1766 | Restored 1980s to 1990s, in private ownership | |
| Genovevaburg | Mayen | MYK | RP | Castle, schloss | First mentioned in 1281 | Largely preserved, Eifel Museum and German Slate Museum | |
| Gerolstein Castle | Gerolstein | DAU | RP | Hill castle | 110–1200 | Wall remains, tower remains | |
| Settlement defences of Gerolstein | Gerolstein | DAU | RP | | | | Image wanted |
| Circular rampart | Borler | DAU | RP | Circular rampart | Probably early Celtic | | Image wanted |
| Dietzenley circular rampart | Gerolstein | DAU | RP | Iron Age circular rampart | | Remains | Image wanted |
| Circular rampart on the Hardtberg | Heilenbach | BIT | RP | Circular rampart, Celtic? | | | Image wanted |
| Gödersheim Castle | Wollersheim | DN | NRW | Water castle | First mentioned in 1343 | Remains of the enceinte and the very overshaped gateway | |
| Haus Gronau | Hürtgenwald | DN | NRW | Water castle | c. 17th or 18th century | Preserved | |
| Gudenau Castle | Wachtberg | SU | NRW | Water castle | 120–1250 | Preserved | |
| Schloss Hamm | Hamm | BIT | RP | Hill castle | 11th century | Destroyed by fire in 1945 behind the façade; rebuilt in the 1960s | |
| Hardtburg | Stotzheim | EU | NRW | Water castle, lowland castle | 11th or 12th century | Well preserved ruins | |
| Hartelstein Castle | Schwirzheim | BIT | RP | | | | Image wanted |
| Hausen Castle | Hausen | DN | NRW | Water castle | Before 1348 | Considerable elements have survived | |
| Hengebach Castle | Heimbach | EU | NRW | Hill castle | Before 1348 | Considerable elements have survived | |
| Haus Heppingen (Schloss Metternich) | Heppingen | AW | RP | Former water castle | | | Image wanted |
| Settlement defences of Heimersheim | Heimersheim | AW | RP | | | | Image wanted |
| Heistard Castle | Holzheim | EU | NRW | Water castle, lowland castle | Around 1333 | Round tower | |
| Hillesheim Castle | Hillesheim | DAU | RP | Castle | Before 1306 | No remains survive above ground | Image wanted |
| Town fortification of Hillesheim | Hillesheim | DAU | RP | | No later than the 2nd half of the 13th century | Considerable remains survive | |
| Holzheim Castle | Heistern | DN | NRW | Lowland castle | 1333 | Preserved or considerable elements have survived | |
| Hüngersdorf Castle | Hüngersdorf | DAU | RP | | Probably 13th century | ’‘Burgstall’’ | Image wanted |
| Icorigium, Roman castrum | Jünkerath | DAU | RP | Kastell | Beginn 4th century | No above ground remains survive | |
| Roman castrum | Bitburg | BIT | RP | | | | Image wanted |
| Johanniterkomturei | Adenau | AW | RP | Manor house and domestic courtyard | No later than the 12th century | Partly preserved, today used for events | Image wanted |
| Johanniterkomturei | Roth an der Our | BIT | RP | Komturei/Kommende des Templerordens | First half of the 12th century | Destroyed several times during the 12th century, converted and rebuilt in 1962 | |
| Schloss Jünkerath (Glaader Burg) | Jünkerath | DAU | RP | Converted in 1726–1737 | Razed in 1737 after a lightning strike | Wall remains | |
| Manderschscheidsche Burg Kail | Oberkail | BIT | RP | Water castle | 1340 | 1809 partly demolished | Image wanted |
| Kallmuth Castle | Kallmuth | EU | NRW | Lowland castle | 13th century | Preserved | |
| Celtic circular rampart | Steineberg | DAU | RP | Circular rampart | 500 or 300 to 100 BC | | Image wanted |
| Celtic refuge castle of Hicastel | Olmscheid | BIT | RP | Refuge castle and Roman fortification | 6th century BC | | Image wanted |
| Celtic refuge castle | Schönecken | BIT | RP | refuge castle | 400 BC to 100 AD | Dolomite blocks | Image wanted |
| Kemplon Castle | Cochem | COC | RP | | | | Image wanted |
| Kasselburg | Meuspath | AW | RP | | | | Image wanted |
| Kasselburg | Pelm | DAU | RP | Hill castle | 1100 to 1200 | Considerable elements have survived | |
| Katzenberg Hillfort, Roman watchtower | Mayen | MYK | RP | | | | Image wanted |
| Kastellberg, Burgwall | Hörschhausen | DAU | RP | | | | Image wanted |
| Town fortification | Mayen | MYK | RP | | | | |
| Kempenich Castle | Kempenich | AW | RP | Hill castle | First mentioned around 1200 | Partly destroyed, partly rebuilt | Image wanted |
| Kerpen Castle | Kerpen | DAU | RP | Hill castle, hill spur site | Around 1150 | Considerable elements have survived | |
| Valley fortification | Kerpen | DAU | RP | | | | Image wanted |
| Early mediaeval castle and Salian period tower castle | Kerpen | DAU | RP | Castle | 10th and 11th centuries | | Image wanted |
| Kinheim Castle | Kinheim | WIT | RP | Castle | 12th century | Remains, tower | Image wanted |
| Kirspenich Castle | Kirspenich | EU | NRW | Water castle | Second half of the 12th century | Considerable elements have survived | |
| Klüsserath Castle | Klüsserath | TR | RP | Water castle | 12th to 13th century, cellar from the 7th century | Preserved | |
| Schloss Knoppenburg urspr. „Hof auf der Heyde“ | Neudorf | Canton of Eupen | B | | 16th century | Preserved | |
| Niederburg, Kobern | Kobern-Gondorf | MYK | RP | Hill castle | | Ruins | |
| Oberburg, Kobern | Kobern-Gondorf | MYK | RP | Hill castle | | Partly preserved | |
| Kommern Castle | Kommern | EU | NRW | Hill castle, urban location | Around 1350 | Preserved or considerable elements have survived | |
| Kordel Fortress | Kordel | TR | RP | | | | Image wanted |
| Kreuzberg Castle | Kreuzberg | AW | RP | Hill castle | From the 14th century, remodelled several times | Considerable elements have survived | |
| Schloss Kewenig | Körperich | BIT | RP | Water castle | First mentioned in 1231 | Fell into ruin in 1816 and was expanded from 1890 to 1891. Suffered enormous damage in a fire in 2013 | Image wanted |
| Kronenburg | Kronenburg | EU | NRW | Castle and settlement defences | 13th century | Ruins | |
| Kreuzau Castle | Kreuzau | DN | NRW | Hill castle | Around 1330 | Preserved or considerable elements have survived | |
| Kyllburg | Kyllburg | BIT | RP | Hill castle, urban location | 1239 | Partly preserved | |
| Laach Castle | Kruft | MYK | RP | Hill castle, hill spur site, motte | 11th century | ’‘Burgstall’’ | Image wanted |
| Laufenburg | Langerwehe | DN | NRW | Hill castle | Before 1100 | Preserved or considerable elements have survived | |
| Landskron Castle | Bad Neuenahr-Ahrweiler | AW | RP | | | | |
| Schloss Liebieg | Kobern-Gondorf | MYK | RP | Lower ward | Built 1255–1272 as a castle | Remodelled, restored, in private ownership | |
| town wall of Ediger | Ediger-Eller | COC | RP | Town fortification | From 1362 | | |
| Lehmen Castle | Lehmen | MYK | P | 18th century | 18th century | | Image wanted |
| Lehmen Tower House | Ediger-Eller | COC | RP | Fortified Romanesque tower house | 1233/34 | Ruins | |
| Lindweiler Castle | Lindweiler | EU | NRW | Water castle | Probably 13th century | niedergelegt | Image wanted |
| Lissingen Castle | Gerolstein | DAU | RP | Water castle | 13th century | Fully preserved | |
| Ließem Castle | Ließem | BIT | RP | tower castle | 1353 | Several remodellings, partly preserved | Image wanted |
| Schloss Lieser | Lieser | WIT | RP | Schloss | 1884–1887 on the site of the 1710 manor house | Preserved | |
| Schloss Lontzen | Lontzen | Canton of Eupen | B | | Before 1286 | | |
| Löwenburg | Monreal | MYK | RP | Hill castle, hill spur site | 13th century | Ruins | |
| Phillipsburg | Monreal | MYK | RP | Hill castle, hill spur site | 13th century | Ruins | |
| Lower ward and valley fortification of Manderscheid | Manderscheid | WIT | RP | Hill castle | 1133 or 1173 | Ruins | |
| Upper ward of Manderscheid | Manderscheid | WIT | RP | Hill castle | 1141–1146 | Ruins | |
| Mauel Castle | Gemünd | EU | NRW | Lowland castle ? | First mentioned in 1353 | Location uncertain, no remains, built over | Image wanted |
| Settlement defences of Monreal | Monreal | MYK | RP | | | | Image wanted |
| Schloss Monaise | Euren | TR | RP | Schloss | 1779–1783 | Preserved | |
| Martberg, Celtic oppidum | Pommern | COC | RP | | | | Image wanted |
| Münchhausen Castle | Wachtberg | SU | NRW | Water castle, lowland castle | 893 | Largely preserved | |
| Musweiler Water Castle | Musweiler | WIT | RP | Water castle | | | Image wanted |
| Town fortifications of Münstermaifeld | Münstermaifeld | MYK | RP | | | | Image wanted |
| Lower Castle, Antweiler | Antweiler | EU | NRW | Water castle | 16th century | Preserved or considerable elements have survived | |
| Schloss Malberg | Malberg | BIT | RP | Schloss | Predecessor demolished in 1203, new castle built in 1224, converted in 1588 | | |
| Mirbach Castle | Mirbach | DAU | RP | | | On the remains of historical foundation walls an artificial ruin was built. | Image wanted |
| Fortress Mont Royal | Traben-Trarbach | WIT | RP | Fortress | 1687 to 1698 | Ruins, a few wall remains | |
| Schloss Merkelshausen | Oberpierscheid | BIT | RP | Hunting lodge | 1892 to 1893 | | Image wanted |
| Schloss Merode | Merode | DN | NRW | Water castle | First mentioned in 1170 | Heavily damaged in a major fire in 2000, but rebuilt | |
| Namedy Castle | Namedy | MYK | RP | Water castle, baroque schloss | 14th century | Preserved | |
| Neuenahr Castle | Bad Neuenahr | AW | RP | Hill castle | Around 1225 | Ruins | Image wanted |
| Neublankenheim Castle | Leudesdorf | DAU | NRW | Hill castle | 13th or 14th century | Ruins | |
| Neuerburg | Neuerburg | BIT | RP | Hill castle, hillside location | 892 / 1132 | Preserved or considerable elements have survived | |
| Neuerburg | Neuerburg, Wittlich | WIT | RP | Hill castle | 1140–1146 | Ruins, remains | Image wanted |
| Neuweiler Castle | Blankenheim | EU | NRW | Hill castle | 11th century | A few remains | Image wanted |
| Niederbettingen Castle | Niederbettingen | DAU | RP | Hill castle | No later than the 13th century | Ruins | Image wanted |
| Schloss Niederweis | Niederweis | BIT | RP | | 1551 | Preserved | |
| Bettingen Castle | Bettingen | BIT | RP | Castle | 13th century | Ruins | Image wanted |
| Settlement defences | Niederbettingen | DAU | RP | Partly water castle | | Remains of the enceinte of the high mediaeval, former water castle | Image wanted |
| Nürburg | Nürburg | AW | RP | Hill castle, summit location | Around 1166 | Ruins | |
| Schloss Oberhausen | Oberhausen | Canton of St. Vith | B | Schloss | 18th century | Preserved | Image wanted |
| Schloss Oberehe | Oberehe | DAU | RP | | | | |
| Odenhausen Castle | Wachtberg-Berbum | SU | NRW | Hill castle (water castle) with motte in front | 1000–1100 | Preserved | |
| Olbrück Castle | Niederdürenbach | AW | RP | Hill castle | Around 1100 | Ruins | |
| Ouren Castle | Ouren | Canton of St. Vith | B | Hill castle, urban location | 12th century | Ruins | |
| Schloss Marienfels | Remagen | AW | RP | Neogothic | 1859 | Preserved | |
| Palatinateel Castle | Palatinateel | TR | RP | Castle | 1131–1152 over a Roman palatiolum | Reduced to ashes several times, rebuilt, a few remains | Image wanted |
| Town fortification/ Palatinateel Fortress | Palatinateel | TR | RP | | | | Image wanted |
| Prüm Castle | Prüm | BIT | RP | Residence and Benedictine monastery | | | Image wanted |
| Prümerburg | Prümzurlay | BIT | RP | Hill castle | Around 1100 to 1200 | Ruins | |
| Pützfeld Castle | Ahrbrück | AW | RP | Lowland castle | Around 1222 | Wall remains | Image wanted |
| Pyrmont Castle | Roes | COC | RP | Hill castle | End of the 12th century | Survives in places, safety work, rebuilding underway | |
| Quinter Schloss | Quint | TR | RP | Schloss | 18th century | Preserved | |
| Ramstein Castle | Kordel | TR | RP | Hill castle | Original built in the 10th century, new castle built in the 14th century | Ruins | |
| Reetz Castle | Reetz | EU | NRW | Burghaus | 16th century | Preserved | Image wanted |
| Raaf Castle | Eynatten | Canton of Eupen | B | Water castle | 14, century | Ruins | |
| Raeren Castle | Raeren | Canton of Eupen | B | Water castle | Around 1350 | Preserved or considerable elements have survived | |
| Haus Raeren | Raeren | Canton of Eupen | B | Water castle | 14th century | survives in its original state, in private ownership | |
| Reifferscheid Castle | Reifferscheid | EU | NRW | Hill castle | First mentioned in 1106 | Ruins | |
| Reifferscheid valley fortification | Reifferscheid | EU | NRW | | | | Image wanted |
| Siege castle against Reifferscheid | Reifferscheid | EU | NRW | | | | Image wanted |
| Reinhardstein Castle | Ovifat | Canton of Malmedy | B | Hill castle | 1354 | Preserved or considerable elements have survived | |
| Reuland Castle | Burg-Reuland | Canton of St. Vith | B | Hill castle, urban location | 11th to 12th century | Ruins | |
| Circular rampart | Weinersheim | BIT | RP | Circular rampart | | | Image wanted |
| Ripsdorf Castle | Ripsdorf | EU | NRW | | Probably 13th century | ’‘Burgstall’’ | Image wanted |
| Rittersdorf Castle | Rittersdorf | BIT | RP | Lowland castle, urban location | 1263 | Preserved | |
| Rohr Castle | Rohr | EU | NRW | Urban location | Probably 13th century | ’‘Burgstall’’, a few remains | Image wanted |
| Rolandseck Castle | Rolandswerth | AW | RP | Hill castle | 1122, perhaps 1040 | Ruins, castle destroyed in 1445 | |
| Saffenburg | Mayschoß | AW | RP | Hill castle | Around 1047 | Ruins | |
| Satzvey Castle | Satzvey | EU | NRW | Water castle | 12th century | Preserved | |
| Schloss Schleiden | Schleiden | EU | NRW | Hill castle | 12th century | Preserved | |
| valley fortification of Schleiden | Schleiden | EU | NRW | | | | Image wanted |
| Schmidtheim Castle | Schmidtheim | EU | NRW | Castle | 12th century | Foundation walls | Image wanted |
| Schloss Schmidtheim | Schmidtheim | EU | NRW | Water castle | Between 16 und 18th century | Tower house has survived | |
| Haus Schneidhausen | Kreuzau | DN | NRW | Herrensitz | 1743 | Preserved | |
| Schönecken Castle | Schönecken | BIT | RP | Hill castle | Around 1230 | Ruins | |
| Schwedenfeste (Bauernburg) | Kirchweiler | DAU | RP | | 1743 | | Image wanted |
| Seinsfeld Castle | Seinsfeld | BIT | RP | Water castle | Around 1325 | Considerable elements have survived | |
| Simonskall Castle | Simonskall | DN | NRW | Lowland castle | 1643 | | |
| Schloss Thor | Astenet | Canton of Eupen | B | | 14th century | Preserved | framless |
| Tomburg Castle | Wormersdorf | SU | NRW | Hill castle | Around 900 | Ruins, remains of the bergfried, castle well | |
| Town fortification of Remagen | Remagen | AW | RP | town wall etc. | From the 1357 | Parts still visible | |
| Stockem Castle | Eupen | Canton of Eupen | B | Lowland castle | 18th to 19th century | Preserved or considerable elements have survived | |
| Stolzenburg | Between Sötenich and Urft | EU | NRW | Hill castle | | Ruins | |
| Stolberg Castle | Stolberg | AC | NRW | Hill castle | 12th century | Destroyed and rebuilt several times, survives today | |
| Stromberg | Nähe Ripsdorf | EU | NRW | Hill castle, motte | | Remains, could go back to the Celtic era | Image wanted |
| Tandel Castle | Tandel | Canton of Vianden | L | Hill castle | 7th–9th century wooden structure, 10the century castle built | Remodelled several times, expanded, ruins | |
| Trutzeltz Castle | Wierschem | MYK | RP | | | | |
| Castles of Ulmen | Ulmen | COC | RP | Hill castle | 12th to 13th century | Ruins | |
| Ulmen valley fortification | Ulmen | COC | RP | | | | Image wanted |
| Untermaubach Castle | Kreuzau | DN | NRW | Hill castle | 1350 | Preserved or considerable elements have survived | |
| Castle Obermaubach | Kreuzau | DN | NRW | Motte and bailey castle | 1152 | Hardly any remains survive | Image wanted |
| Viereckschanze | Eisenach | BIT | RP | | späte Latènezeit | | Image wanted |
| Vianden Castle | Vianden | Canton of Vianden | L | Hill castle | Around 1000 to 1100 | Preserved or largely preserved | |
| Schloss Vehn | Sinzig | AW | RP | Water castle, schloss | First mentioned in 1019 | Remodelled several times, preserved | |
| Schloss Vettelhoven | Vettelhoven | AW | RP | Schloss | 1890 | | |
| Vettelhoven Castle | Vettelhoven | AW | RP | Burghaus with corner towr | 15th century | | Image wanted |
| Schwedenschanze | Hillesheim | DAU | RP | | Early Modern Period | No visible remains survive | Image wanted |
| Castle Veynau | Wißkirchen | EU | NRW | Water castle, lowland castle | Around 1340 | Preserved or considerable elements have survived | |
| Schloss Wachendorf | Mechernich | EU | NRW | Schloss | The present schloss was built around 1780. | Preserved, wedding venue for Mechernich and Zen temple | |
| Virneburg | Virneburg | MYK | RP | Hill castle | Second half of the 12th century | Ruins | |
| Schloss Vischel | Vischel | AW | RP | Water castle | 9th century | The present schloss was built in 1829. | |
| Vlatten Castle | Vlatten | DN | NRW | Lowland castle | Before 1331 | Preserved or considerable elements have survived | |
| Vlattenhaus | Eynatten | Canton of Eupen | B | Water castle | 14th century | destroyed, remains, rebuilt | |
| Waldenburghaus formerly “Schloss Merols” | Kettenis | Canton of Eupen | B | | First mentioned in 1266 | Preserved | |
| Schloss Wallerode | St. Vith | Canton of St. Vith | B | Hill castle | 17th century | Preserved | Image wanted |
| Burghaus Wassenach | Wassenach | AW | RP | | 1772 | Preserved | |
| Schloss Weilerbach | Bollendorf | TR | RP | Water castle | 1777–1780 | Preserved | |
| Schloss Weims | Kettenis | Canton of Eupen | B | | First mentioned in 1334 | Preserved | |
| White Tower | Ahrweiler | AW | RP | Tower house | 13th century | Preserved | |
| White Tower | Weißenthurm | MYK | RP | Customs post and tower house | Early 15th century | Preserved | |
| Welschbillig Castle | Welschbillig | TR | RP | Water castle | 12th century | Ruins | |
| Fortifications with bank and ditches on the Ritschberg | Oberweiler | BIT | RP | | BC | | Image wanted |
| Winneburg | Cochem | COC | RP | | | | |
| Wensburg | Lind | AW | RP | Spur castle | 13th to 14th century | Ruins | |
| Wernerseck Castle | Ochtendung | MYK | RP | Hill castle | 1202 | Ruins | |
| Wildenburg Castle | Hellenthal | EU | NRW | Hill castle. hill spur site | 1202–1235 | Preserved | |
| Wildenburg | Bürvenich | EU | NRW | | 11th–12th century | Preserved | |
| Town fortifications of Winningen | Winningen | MYK | NRW | Town fortifications | Begun 1398, reinforced 1568–1583 by an enceinte | Remains, town gate | |
| Zievel Castle | Lessenich | EU | NRW | Lowland castle | 1107 | gut preserved | |
| Zülpich Castle | Zülpich | EU | NRW | Lowland castle | 14th century | Preserved or considerable elements have survived | |
| Schloss Zur Leyen | Kobern-Gondorf | MYK | RP | Castle | 14th century | Preserved, road was led through the building however | |
| Zur Leyen Castle or Ockerfels Castle | Ürzig | WIT | RP | Hill castle | 1200–1250 | Remains with new elements | |
| Zewen Tower | Zewen | TR | RP | Fortification and customs post | Anfang 13th century | Preserved | |

== Literature ==
- Bernhard Gondorf (1984), Die Burgen der Eifel und ihrer Randgebiete. Ein Lexikon der "festen Häuser", Cologne: J. P. Bachem, ISBN 3-7616-0723-7
- Dirk Holtermann, Holger A. Dux: Die Dürener Burgenrunde. Radeln zwischen Rur und Eifel. Bouvier, Bonn 2001, ISBN 3-416-02979-8.
- Dirk Holtermann, Harald Herzog: Die Euskirchener Burgenrunde. Radeln zwischen Erft und Eifel. Walter Rau, Düsseldorf, 2000, ISBN 9783791907505
- Matthias Kordel: Die schönsten Schlösser und Burgen in der Eifel. Wartberg, Gudensberg-Gleichen, 1999, ISBN 3-861344823.
- Karl Emerich Krämer: Von Burg zu Burg durch die Eifel. 4th edition. Mercator, Duisburg, 1986, ISBN 3-87463-066-8.
- Michael Losse: Burgen und Schlösser, Adelssitze und Befestigungen in der Vulkaneifel. Michael Imhof, Petersberg, 2012. ISBN 978-3-86568-399-1.
- Michael Losse: Burgen und Schlösser in der Eifel. Regionalia, Rheinbach 2013, ISBN 978-3-939722-44-1.
- Michael Losse: "Keck und fest, mit senkrechten Mauertürmen ... wie eine Krone". Burgen, Schlösser und Fortressen an der Ahr und im Adenauer Land. 1st edition. Schnell & Steiner, Regensburg, 2008, ISBN 978-3-7954-1774-1.
- Michael Losse: Theiss Burgenführer. Hohe Eifel und Ahrtal. Theiss, Stuttgart, 2003, ISBN 3806217750.
