= Eifelsteig =

Long-distance hiking trail in the Eifel, Germany

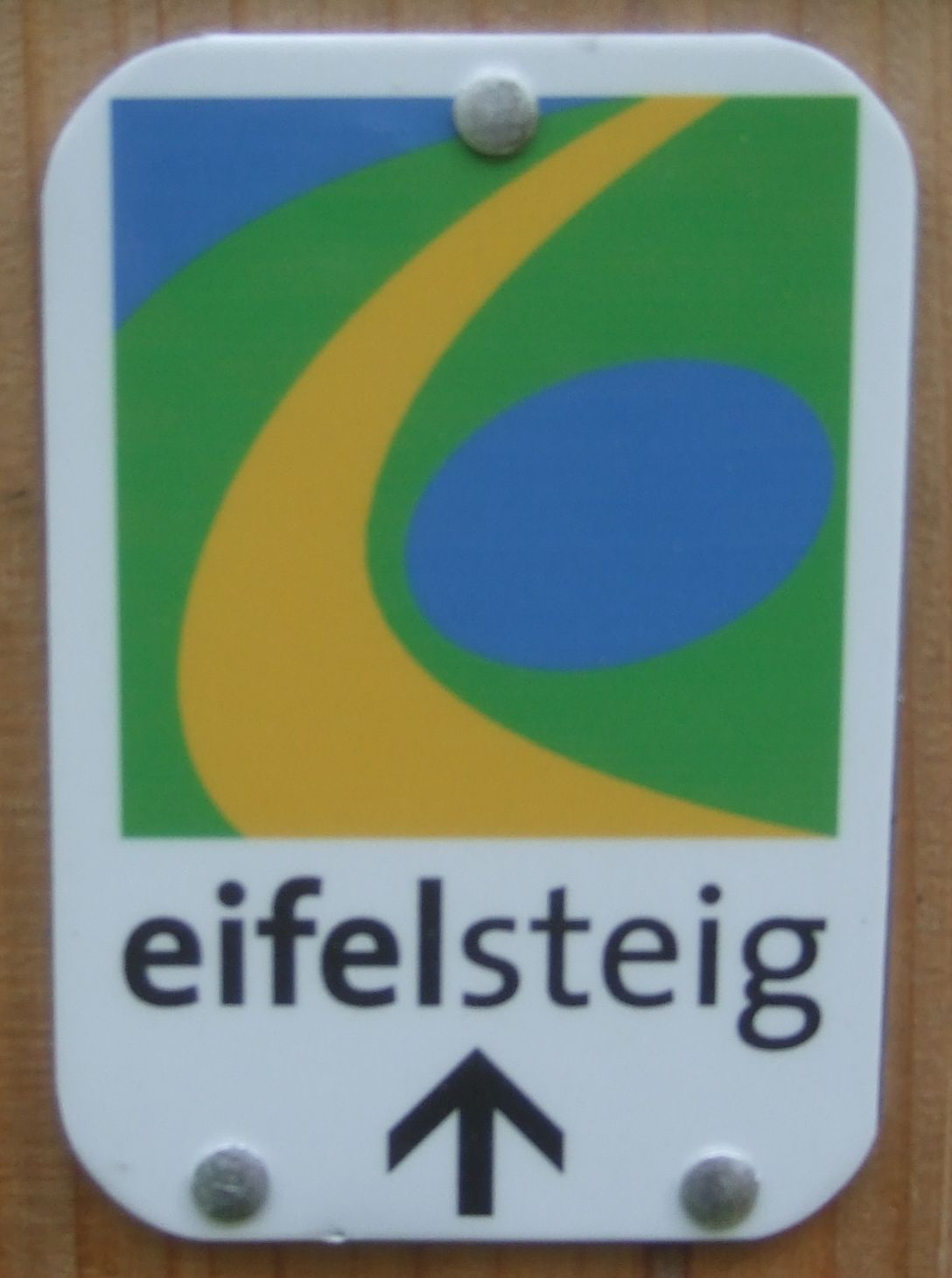
- trail marker on the Eifelsteig
- Length: 312 km (194 mi)
- Location: Germany: Eifel, Vulkaneifel
- Trailheads: Kornelimünster, Trier
- Use: Hiking
- Elevation change: total climbed is 3,731 metres (12,241 ft)
- Highest point: 660 m (2,170 ft)
- Lowest point: 133 m (436 ft)
- Season: all year

The Eifelsteig is a long-distance hiking trail in the Eifel, Germany. It leads in 15 stages of 14–28 kilometres (8.7–17.4 mi) from the Aachen district Kornelimünster to Trier and is maintained by the Eifel Club.

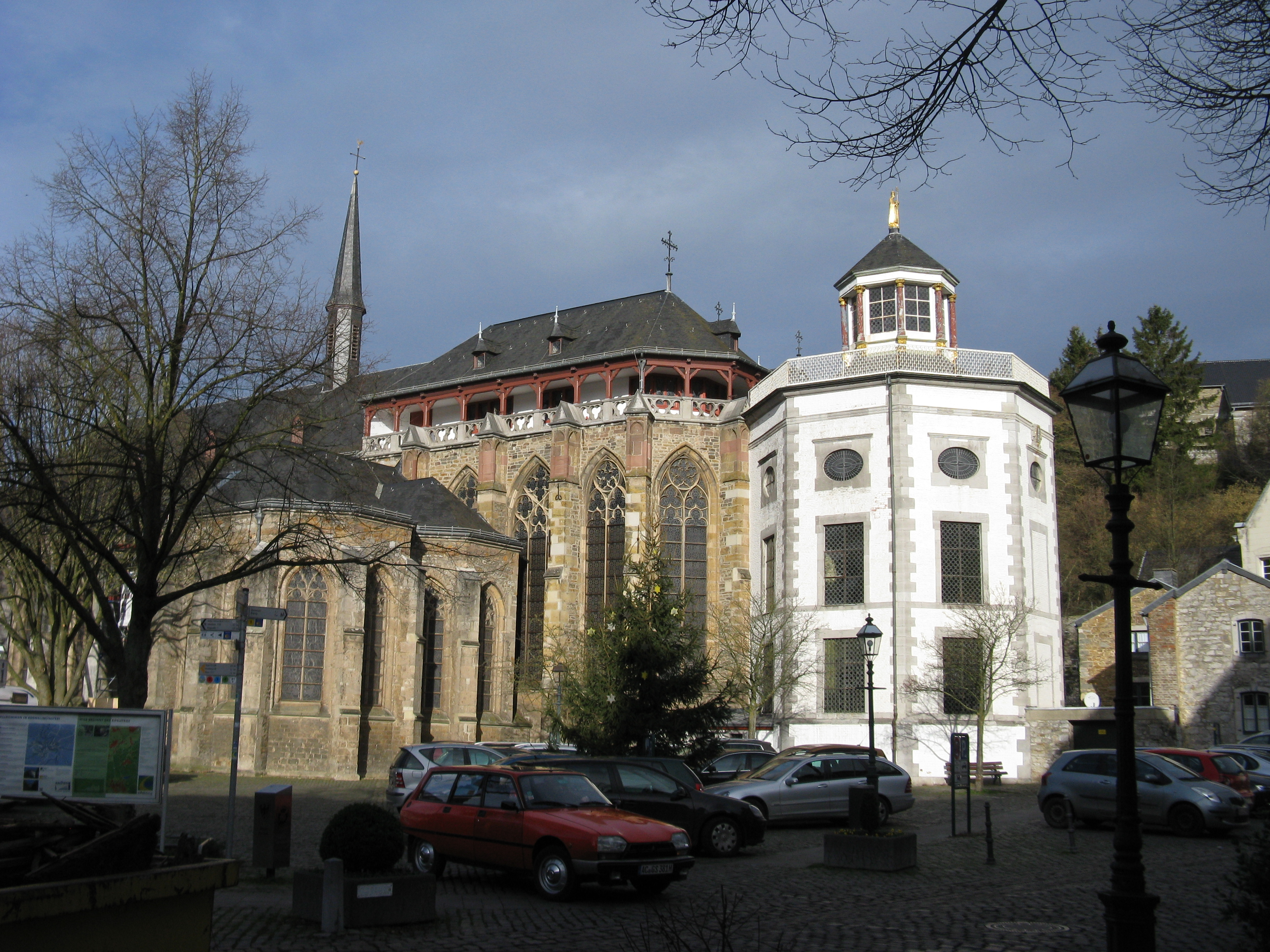
Kornelimünster monastery, Northern start point of the Eifelsteig

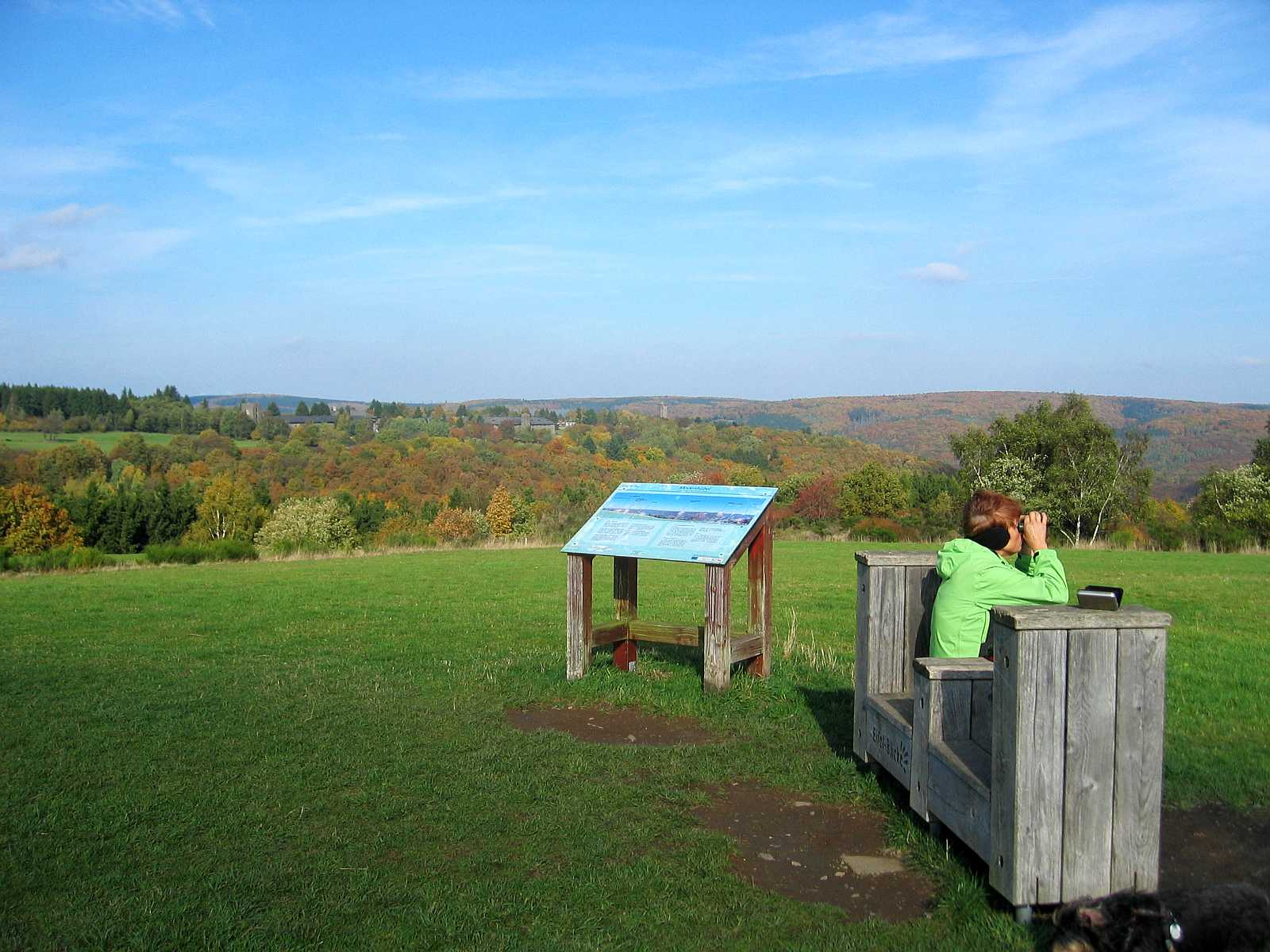
On the hill "Modenhübel" near Gemünd

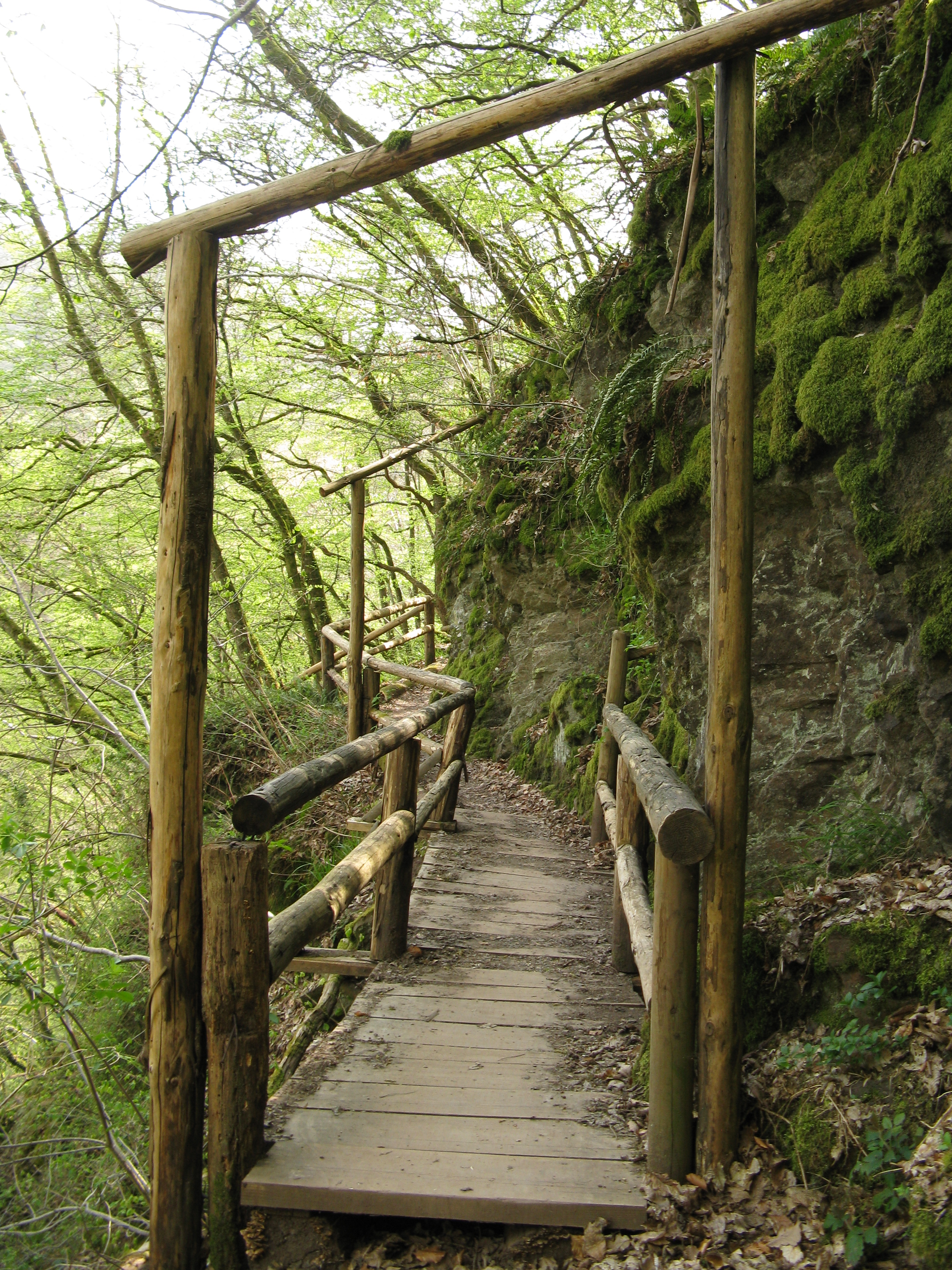
The Lieserpfad is part of the Eifelsteig

Stage	Start	Destination	Distance	Total distance	Duration	Elevation change
1	Kornelimünster	Roetgen	14 km (8.7 mi)	14 km (8.7 mi)	4.5 h	+406; −214
2	Roetgen	Monschau	17.1 km (10.6 mi)	31.1 km (19.3 mi)	4 h	+352; −367
3	Monschau	Einruhr	24.3 km (15.1 mi)	55.4 km (34.4 mi)	6 h	+820; −938
4	Einruhr	Gemünd	21.2 km (13.2 mi)	76.6 km (47.6 mi)	5 h	+705; −605
5	Gemünd	Steinfeld Abbey	17.4 km (10.8 mi)	94 km (58 mi)	6 h	+577; −396
6	Steinfeld Abbey	Blankenheim	23.4 km (14.5 mi)	117.4 km (72.9 mi)	6.5 h	+441; −480
7	Blankenheim	Mirbach	17.7 km (11.0 mi)	135.1 km (83.9 mi)	5 h	+451; −456
8	Mirbach	Hillesheim	26.1 km (16.2 mi)	161.2 km (100.2 mi)	6.5 h	+508; −529
9	Hillesheim	Gerolstein	20.3 km (12.6 mi)	181.5 km (112.8 mi)	5.5 h	+515; −585
10	Gerolstein	Daun	24.1 km (15.0 mi)	205.6 km (127.8 mi)	6 h	+811; −714
11	Daun	Manderscheid	23 km (14 mi)	228.6 km (142.0 mi)	6.5 h	+680; −777
12	Manderscheid	Himmerod Abbey	18 km (11 mi)	246.6 km (153.2 mi)	5.5 h	+632; −702
13	Himmerod Abbey	Bruch	20.5 km (12.7 mi)	267.1 km (166.0 mi)	6 h	+500; −612
14	Bruch	Kordel	27.7 km (17.2 mi)	294.8 km (183.2 mi)	8.5 h	+600; −651
15	Kordel	Trier	17.2 km (10.7 mi)	312 km (194 mi)	5 h	+773; −736
