= Eick =

Eick may refer to:

- EICK, ICAO code for Cork Airport

== People with the surname ==
- Alfred Eick (1916–2015), German U-boat commander
- David Eick (born 1968), American film producer
- Mathias Eick (born 1979), Norwegian jazz musician

=== See also ===
- Theodor Eicke (1892–1943), German SS functionary during the Nazi era
- Eicks, a village in Mechernich, North Rhine-Westphalia, Germany
- Van Eyck (disambiguation)
