= Kerpen Castle (Eifel) =

Burg Kerpen
- Kerpen
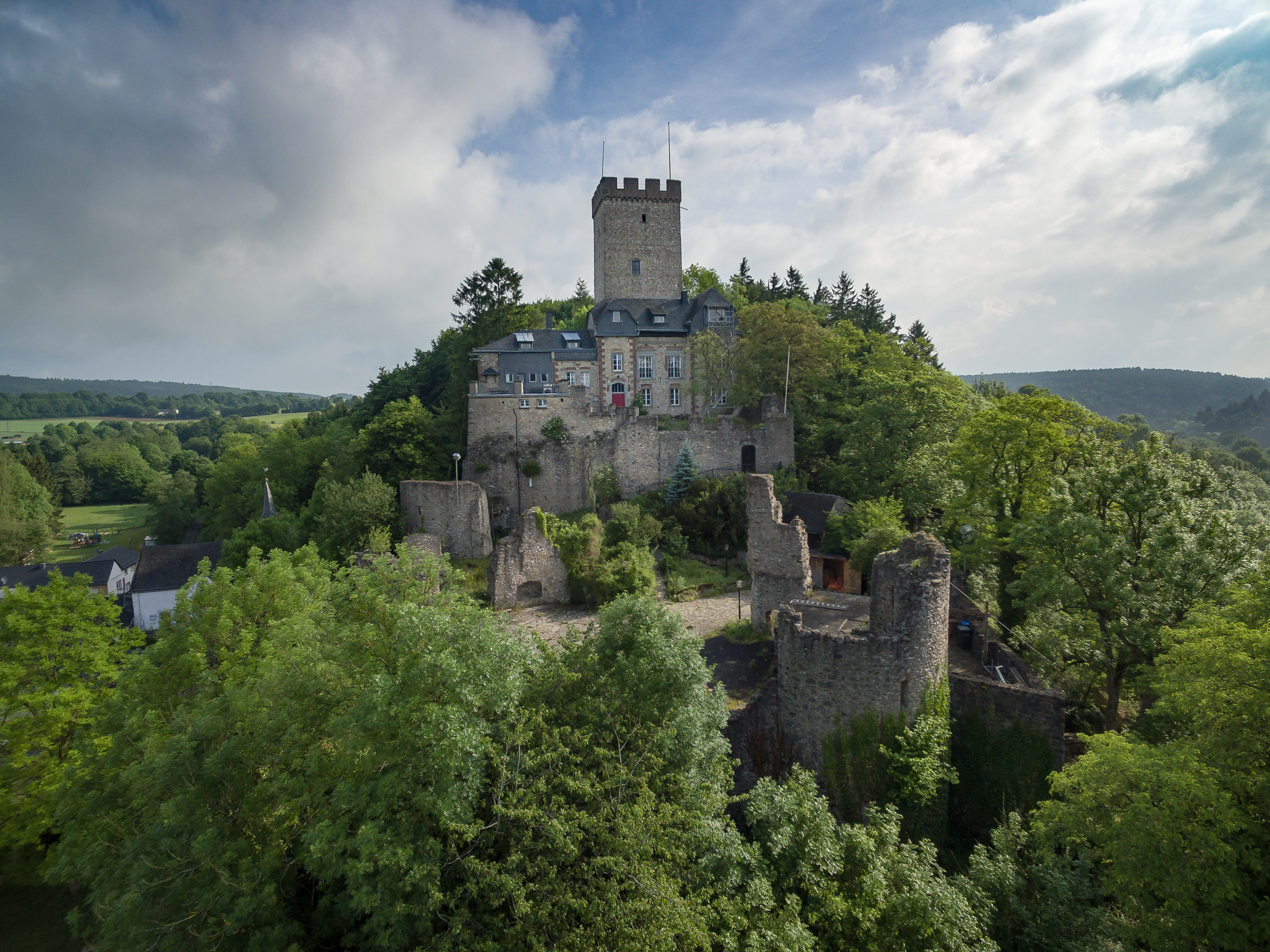
- 2017 aerial photograph of the castle

Site information
- Type: hill castle, spur castle
- Code: DE-RP
- Condition: largely preserved

Location
- Coordinates: 50°18′40″N 06°43′57.43″E
- Height: 500 m above sea level (NHN)

Site history
- Built: c. 1150

Kerpen Castle (German: Burg Kerpen) is a spur castle standing on a dolomite hill spur at a height of 500 m above sea level (NHN) above the Eifel village of Kerpen in the German state of Rhineland-Palatinate.

== History ==
The precise origins of Kerpen Castle are hidden by the mists of time. It is very likely that it was built by Sigibertus de Kerpene, first mentioned in 1136, or his son, Henry I (1142–1177). However, it is not yet possible to give an exact date of construction.

In 1265, Theodoric II of Kerpen converted the castle into a fief of the Archbishop of Cologne, Engelbert II of Falkenburg. The estate was later divided between him and his brother, William II.

In 1299, a 'Theodoric III' is recorded as Lord of Kerpen. His sons later founded the three family lines of Kerpen-Linster, Kerpen-Mörsdorf and Kerpen-Illingen (Lit.: Losse, 2003), who remained the owners of their ancestral castle and turned it into a jointly owned inheritance or Ganerbenburg.

In 1446, Conrad of Kerpen-Mörsdorf sold his share of the castle to his cousin, William II of Sombreff, who acquired another share in 1448. Together with his family inheritance, this made William the sole owner of the castle. After his death, there were ongoing disputes over Kerpen castle, which lasted for more than 200 years.

William's son, Frederick, died childless, so that the castle fell to his sister, Margareta. Through her marriage to Count Dietrich of Manderscheid-Schleiden, the castle came into the possession of the count's family.

At the beginning of the 16th century, Dietrich IV of Manderscheid-Schleiden had a castle chapel built in the Gothic style. When he died childless in 1593, his brother-in-law, Philip of the Mark, had Kerpen Castle occupied by those loyal to him in order to lay claim to the estate. The quarrel between him and Philip's widow ended in a settlement in 1611 and he bought Kerpen from the widow.

But the property disputes were by no means over. In 1653, the Count of Löwenstein-Wertheim also tried to stake his claim to the estate by occupying the castle. It was not until 1674 that the dispute between the various noble families over Kerpen was brought to an end when the Imperial Chamber Court at Spires granted the estate of Kerpen and its castle to the Duchess of Arenberg. The Arenberg family remained owners until 1794, but never realised their initial plans to have the castle transformed into a schloss.

In the Reunion Wars, some of the buildings of the castle were destroyed by French troops in 1682. During the Thirty Years' War, soldiers of the French army under General Bouffleur blew up the castle and village and razed them to the ground.

After the occupation of the left bank of the Rhine by French Revolution troops in 1794, French administrators sold the ruin to the village in 1803 for demolition.

In 1893, Johann Heinrich Dün took over the dilapidated estate. He had it freed of rubble, built the present residential house and put a new battlement on the bergfried.

From 1907 to 1911, Kerpen Castle was owned by Clemens Manstein.

In 1911, Eifel painter, Fritz von Wille, bought the castle from Clemens Manstein and had urgent safety and repair work carried out. When the artist died in 1941, he was buried in the castle grounds.

In the same year, the company of DEMAG bought the castle to use it as a training centre. In the 1950s, the company carried out further measures to secure, modify and expand the castle.

From 1969 to 2007, Kerpen was owned by the county of Neuss, who used it as a country hall of residence (Landschulheim). Then a Dutch family bought the property and underwent extensive renovation in 2010.

Currently (2016) it is used as refugee accommodation.

== Description ==
Kerpen Castle is built on a triple-terraced, hill spur, which is guarded to the north by a roughly 15-metre-wide neck ditch. The battlemented, 23-metre-high, bergfried stands on the first and highest terrace. On the top floor was once a dungeon.

On the middle terrace there used to be domestic and outbuildings, which no longer exist. The only relic from medieval times is the 35-metre-deep castle well in a roundel.

The lowest terrace is surrounded by an enceinte which is supported on heavy pillars. In the 17th century it house several outbuildings and castellan's houses before they were destroyed by the French in 1682.

== Gallery ==
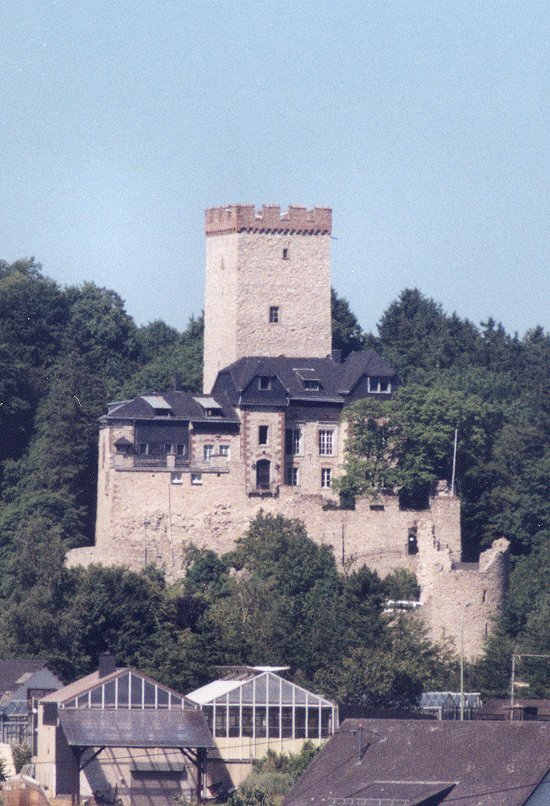
Kerpen Castle seen from the SW (1999)

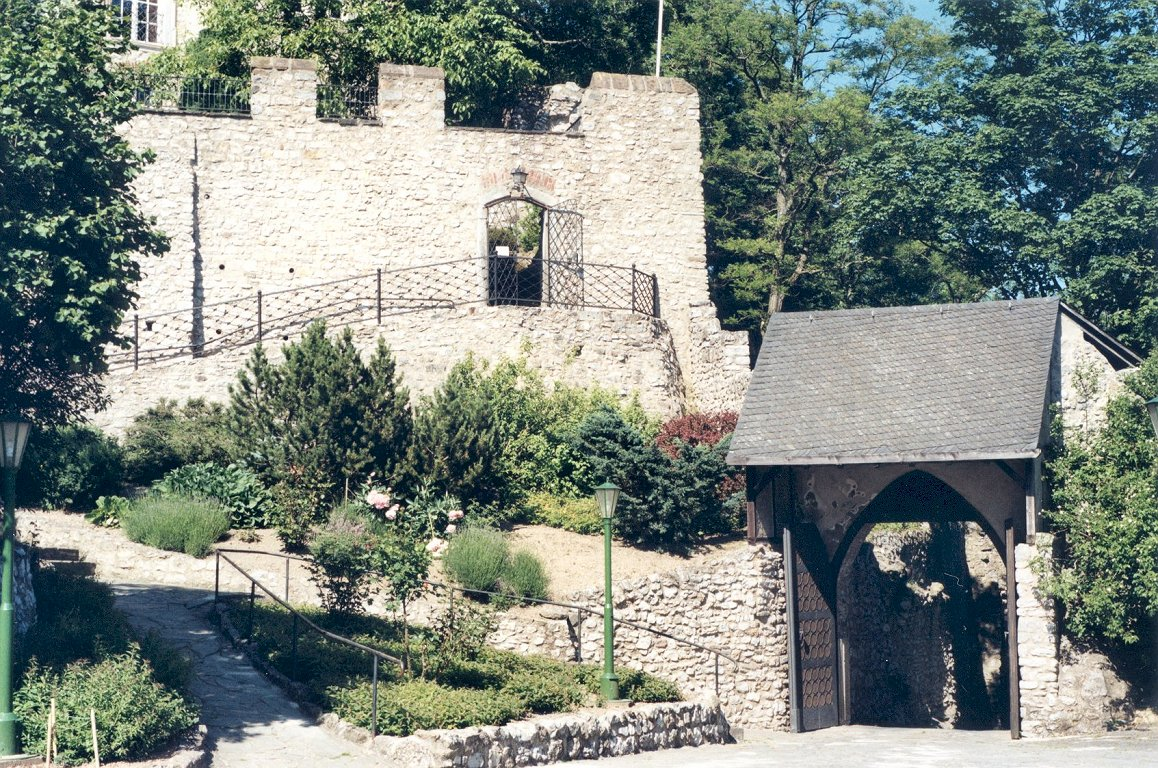
Castle courtyard (1999)

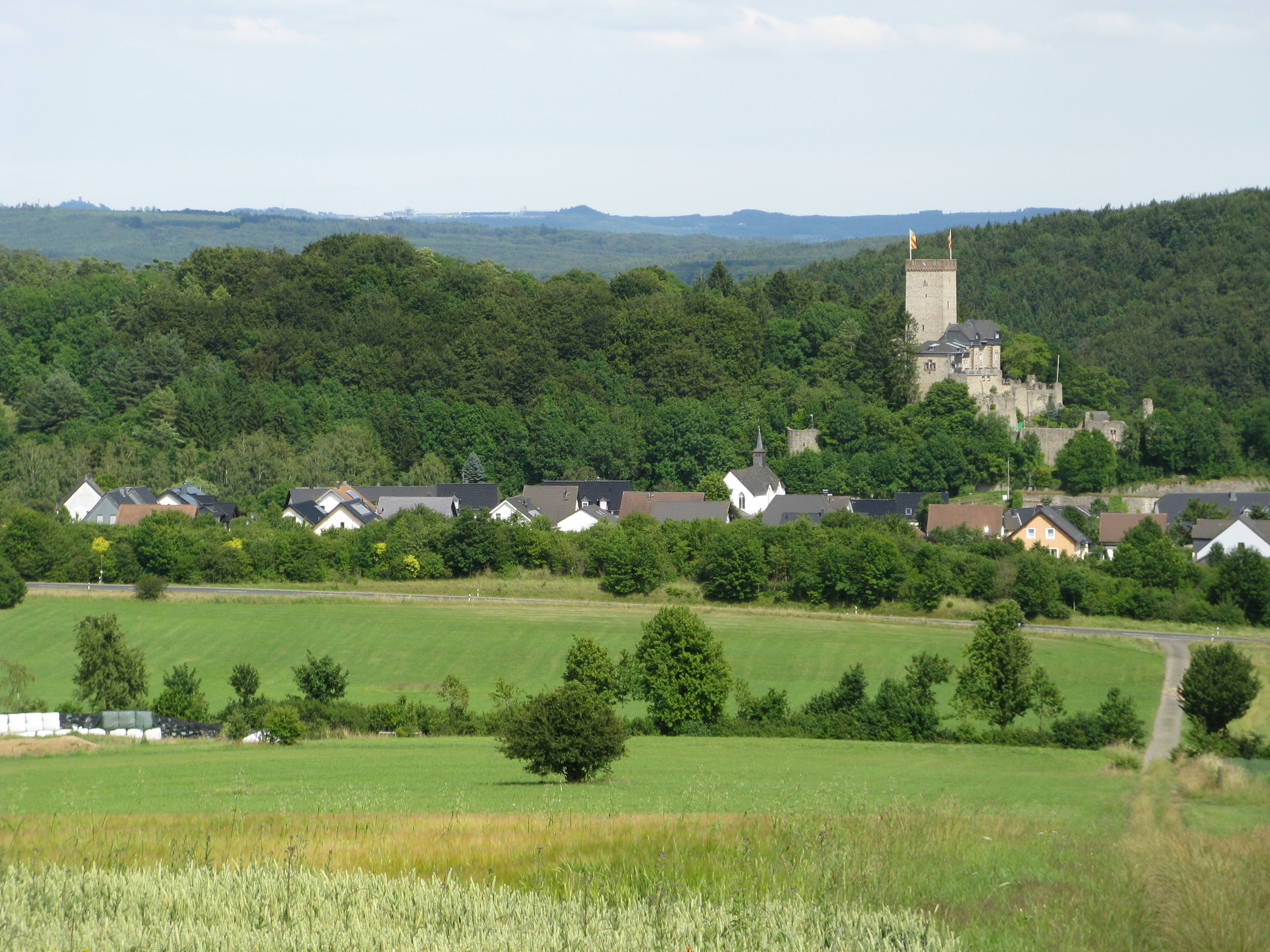
Kerpen Castle seen from the Eifelsteig trail

== Literature ==
- Olaf Wagener: Burg Kerpen. In: Michael Losse: Theiss-Burgenführer Hohe Eifel und Ahrtal. Theiss, Stuttgart, 2003, ISBN 3-8062-1775-0, pp. 82–85.
