= Blens Castle =

Castle in North Rhine-Westphalia, Germany

- Burg Blens
- Blens
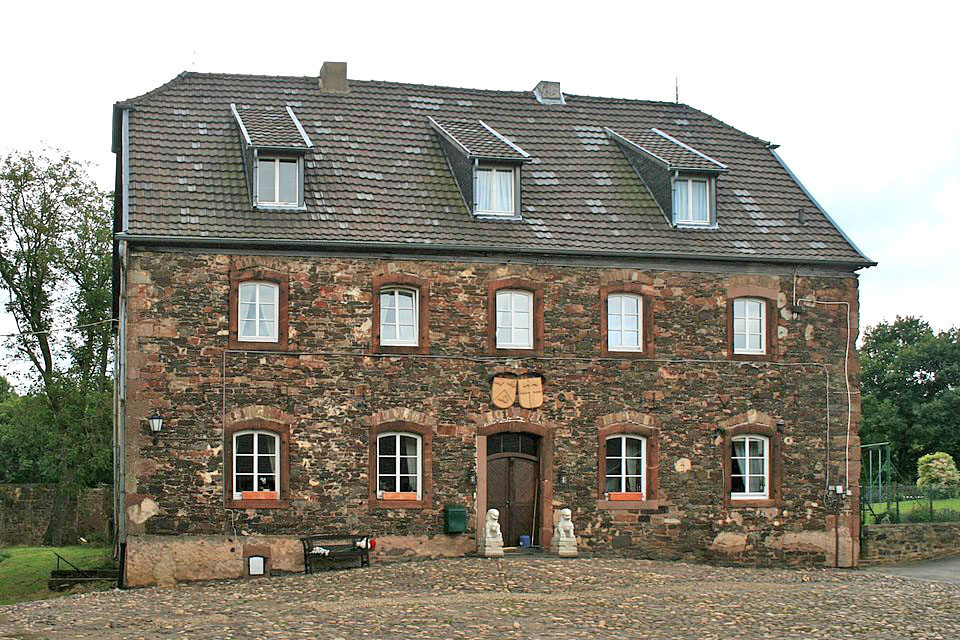
- Manor house of Blens Castle

Site information
- Type: Hill castle
- Code: DE-NW
- Condition: Preserved or largely preserved

Location
- Coordinates: 50°39′34″N 6°28′59″E
- Height: 205 m above sea level (NHN)

Site history
- Built: Around 1100

Garrison information
- Occupants: Nobility

Blens Castle (German: Burg Blens) stands at a height of 205 m above sea level (NHN) on the eastern edge of Blens, a town quarter of Heimbach (Eifel) above the River Rur in the county of Düren, in the German state of North Rhine-Westphalia.

== History ==
As early as the start of the 12th century, a seal belonging to a certain Johannes de Blens is recorded. In 1380 the male line of the de Blens family died out. Through marriage the hill castle went to the von Berg family, who died out in 1550. Agnes of Blens received the estate through inheritance. As a result of marriages the castle went via the Lord (Freiherr) Raitz von Frentz in the 18th century to Lord Beissel of Gymnich. Again through marriage the castle passed via George Anthony Beissel of Gymnich in the 20th century to the House of Abercron, who own and reside in it today.

The "castle" has a quadrangular layout of domestic buildings with a two-storey, rectangular manor house of rubble stone with a half-hipped roof that was built around 1791. Of the former medieval hill castle only the stump of a round tower and some remains of the enceinte have survived. A rarity is the surviving paving of the courtyard with Rur pebbles.

In the 1723 Welser Codex a triangular outer ward and an inner ward is portrayed. It was a three-storey building with three stepped gables on the courtyard and rear sides. The bergfried at the rear of the inner ward towered above it. At the right hand corner of the inner ward, facing the courtyard, was a round tower.

In the immediate vicinity to the northwest of the castle site is the Chapel of St. George.

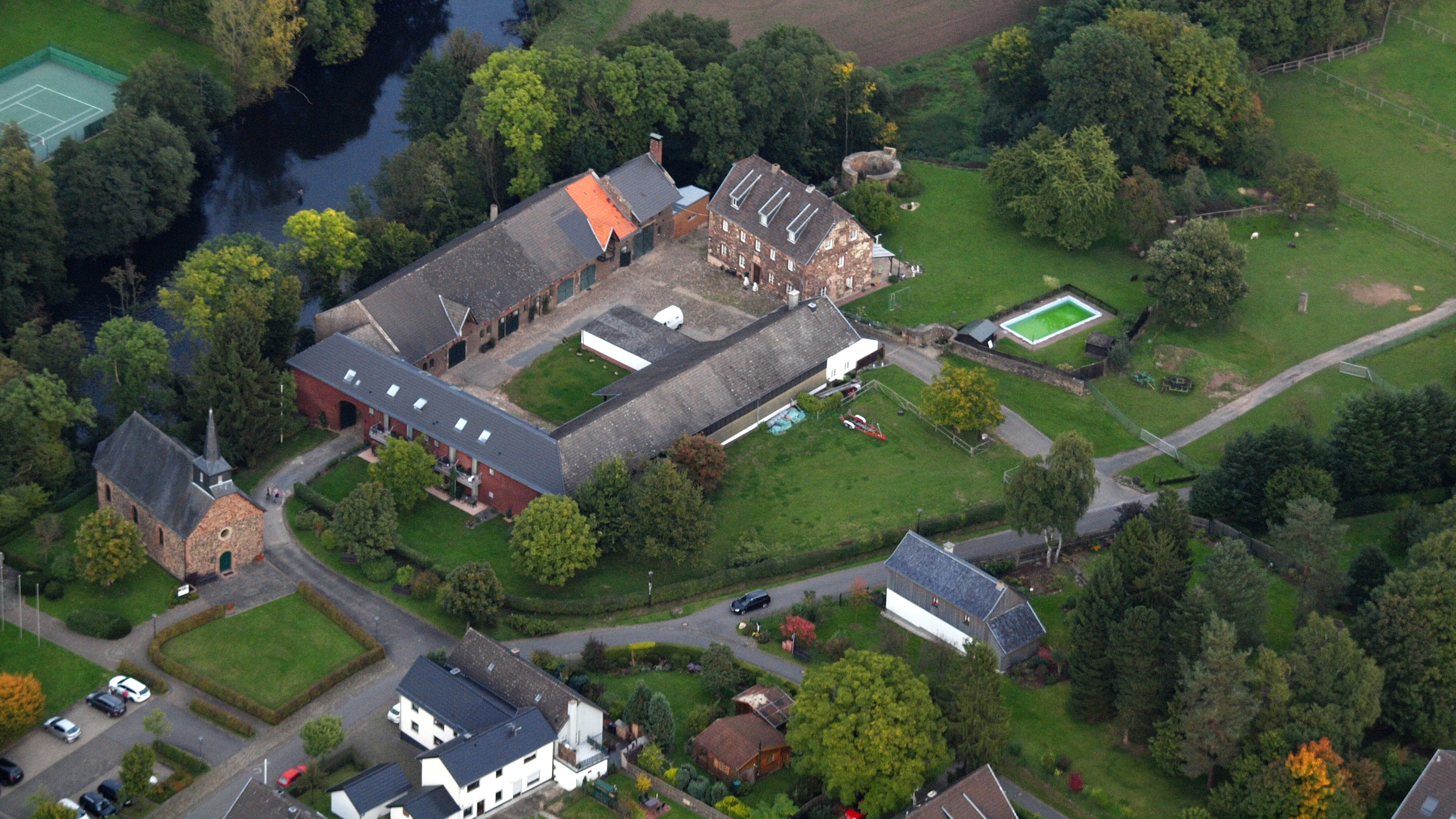
Blens Castle, 2015 aerial photograph

== Literature ==
- Bernhard Gondorf (1984). Die Burgen der Eifel und ihrer Randgebiete. Ein Lexikon der "festen Häuser" [The castles of the Eifel and its outskirts. A dictionary of "solid houses"] (in German). Cologne: J. P. Bachem. p. 86. ISBN 978-3-7616-0723-7.
