= Mechernich =

- Town
- Coat of arms

- Location of Mechernich within Euskirchen district
- Interactive map of Mechernich
- Location within Germany Location within North Rhine-Westphalia
- Coordinates: 50°36′N 6°39′E
- Country: Germany
- State: North Rhine-Westphalia
- Admin. region: Köln
- District: Euskirchen

Government
  - Mayor (2025–30): Michael Fingel (CDU)

Area
  - Total: 136.48 km^{2} (52.70 sq mi)
- Elevation: 365 m (1,198 ft)

Population (2025-12-31)
  - Total: 29,116
  - Density: 213.34/km^{2} (552.54/sq mi)
- Time zone: UTC+01:00 (CET)
  - Summer (DST): UTC+02:00 (CEST)
- Postal codes: 53894
- Dialling codes: 02443, 02256, 02484
- Vehicle registration: EU
- Website: www.mechernich.de

Mechernich (German: [ˈmɛçɐnɪç], Kölsch: Meischernisch) is a town in the district of Euskirchen in the south of the state of North Rhine-Westphalia, Germany. It is located in the "Naturpark Nordeifel" in the Eifel hills, approx. 15 km south-west of Euskirchen and 55 km from Cologne. Mechernich is a former mining town and had, in 2009, its 700-years celebration of foundation. Its local football club is called TUS Mechernich.

== Districts ==
Mechernich has the following districts:

Antweiler, Berg, Bergbuir, Bergheim, Bescheid, Bleibuir, Breitenbenden, Denrath, Dreimühlen, Eicks, Eiserfey, Firmenich, Floisdorf, Gehn, Glehn, Harzheim, Heufahrtshütte, Holzheim, Hostel, Kalenberg, Kallmuth, Katzvey, Kommern, Kommern-Süd, Lessenich, Lorbach, Lückerath, Mechernich, Obergartzem, Rissdorf, Roggendorf, Satzvey (Satzvey Castle), Schaven, Schützendorf, Strempt, Urfey, Voißel, Vollem, Vussem, Wachendorf, Weiler am Berge, Weißenbrunnen, Weyer and Wielspütz.

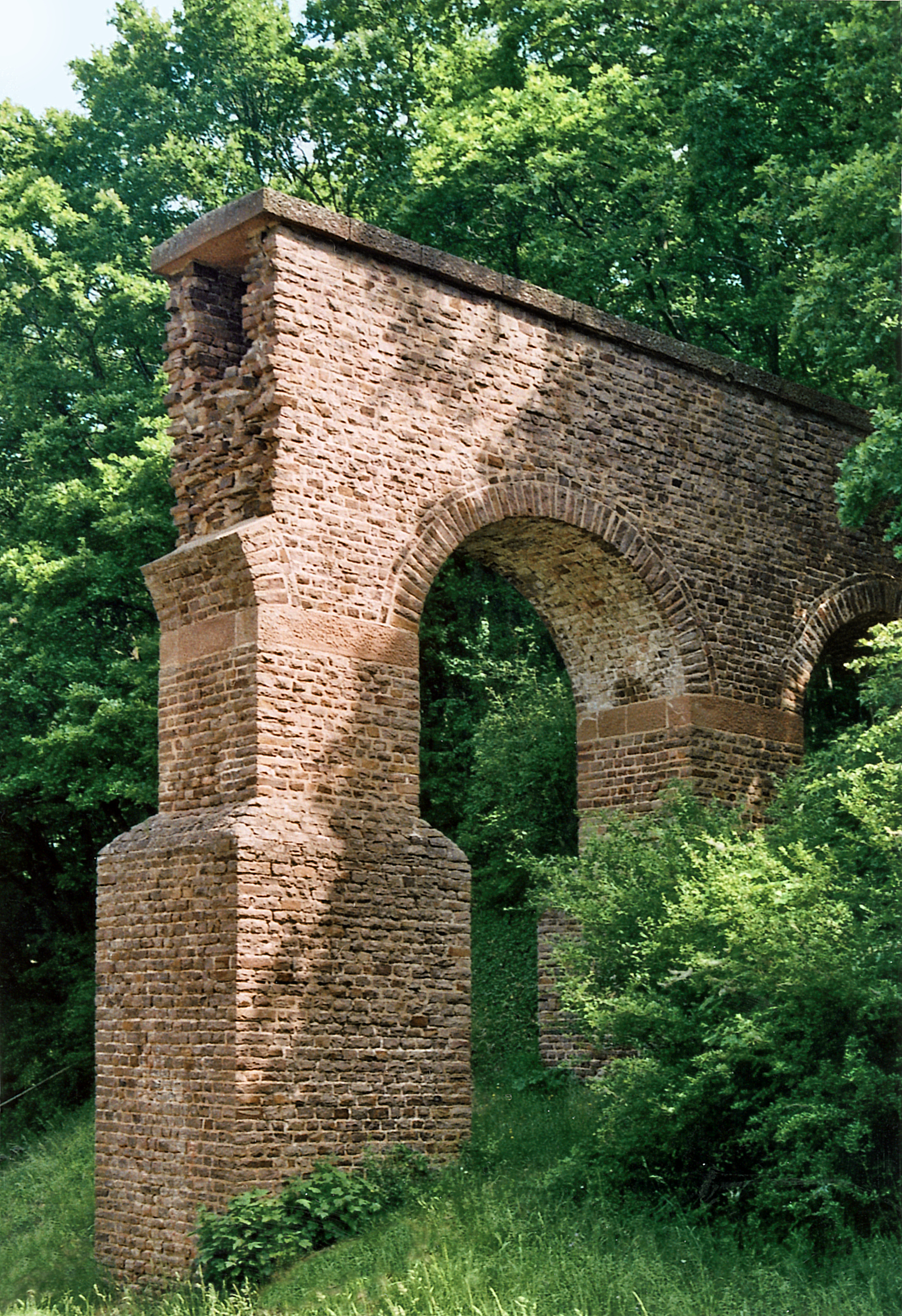
Reconstructed Roman Eifel aqueduct near Mechernich-Vussem

== Population ==
Historical population

Year	Pop.	±% p.a.
1965	19,831	—
1970	20,613	+0.78%
1975	21,484	+0.83%
1980	21,668	+0.17%
1985	22,000	+0.30%
1990	22,755	+0.68%
1995	24,575	+1.55%

Year	Pop.	±% p.a.
2000	26,003	+1.14%
2005	27,368	+1.03%
2010	27,154	−0.16%
2015	27,170	+0.01%
2020	27,986	+0.59%
2025	29,116	+0.79%

Source: Landesdatabank Nordrhein-Westfalen

== Mining tour ==
A tour takes place in the Eifel region, in the galleries of the mining museum in Mechernich.

=== Museums ===
- Kommern Open Air Museum in Kommern
- Mining museum and visitor mine of Grube Günnersdorf
- Nuclear bunker of the North Rhine-Westphalia State Central Bank

== Twin town ==
Since 30 July 1967, the twin town of Mechernich is Nyons, France.
