= Castles of Manderscheid =

Two castle ruins in Germany

Coordinates: 50°5′32″N 6°49′6″E

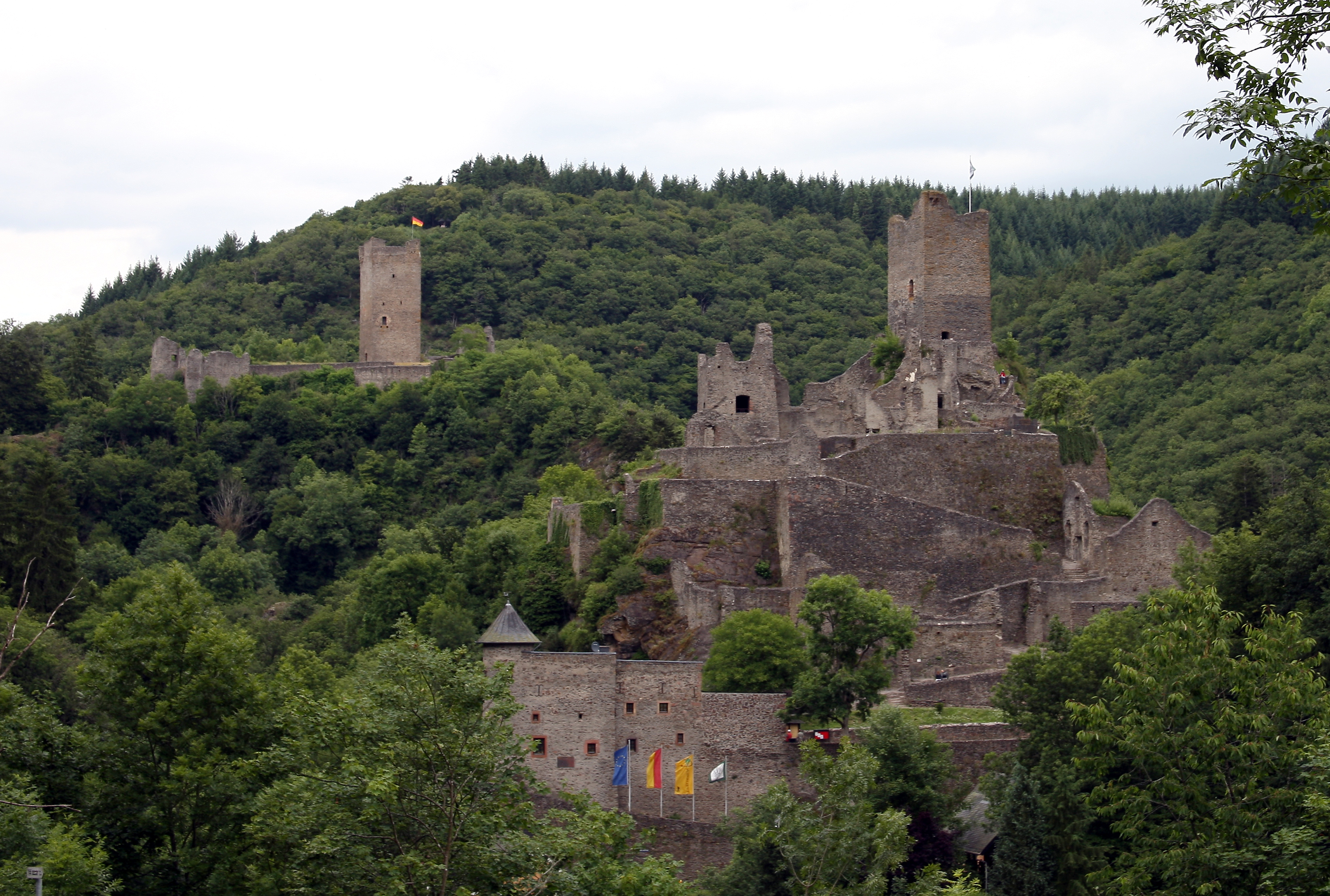
The castles seen from the southwest (left: upper castle; right: lower castle)

Near the Eifel town of Manderscheid are the ruins of two castles, the castles of Manderschied, whose history and location reflect the mediaeval conflict of interest between the Electorate of Trier and the Duchy of Luxembourg.

== Oberburg ==
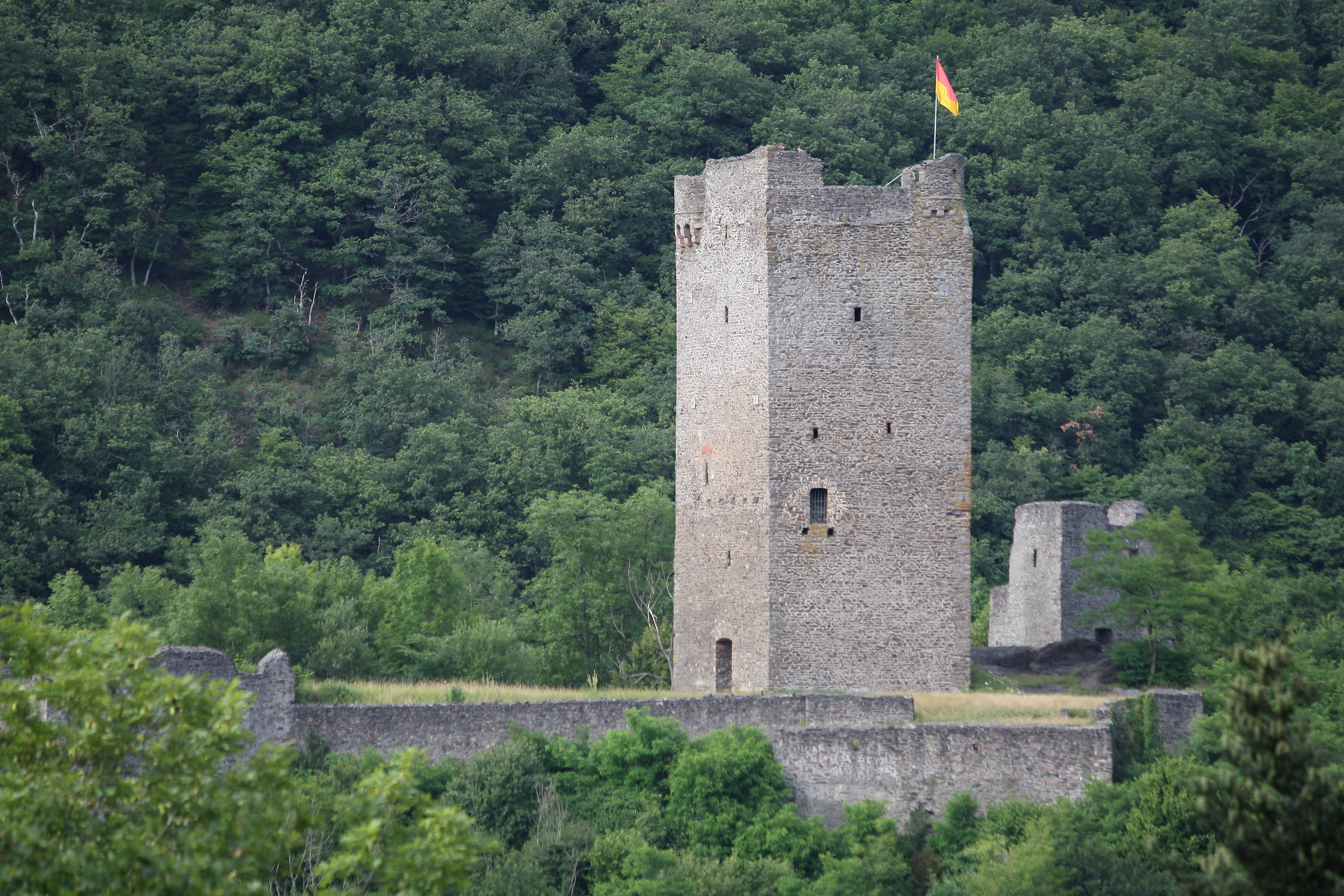
Ruins of the Oberburg

The Oberburg or "Upper Castle" is located on a hilltop that was levelled in order to construct the castle. It had, as can still be seen from the ruins, an almost triangular enceinte and a five-story bergfried or fighting tower that has been made accessible again. From the bergfried there is a clear view of the Niederburg or "Lower Castle", the town of Manderscheid and the countryside of the Lieser valley.

The place name of Manderscheid is first recorded in a deed of gift by Ottos II to the Archbishop of Trier dating to 973. This is not, however, as is often maintained in the literature, the earliest record of the castle, which is first historically known from the feud over St. Maximin's Abbey in front of Trier between Count Henry the Blind of Namur-Luxembourg and Archbishop Albero of Trier, between 1141 and 1146. The free lords of Manderscheid first appear in 1142 in the list of witnesses in a deed of gift. In the 14th century, the village of Obermanderscheid gave its name to the Electoral Trier Amt of Manderscheid, which existed until the late 18th century. However, the seat of government was not at the castle, but in the Kellerei of the neighbouring village to which Elector Baldwin had granted town rights in 1332 (according to other sources they were granted by King Louis the Bavarian as one of a number of rights). The local estates of the Elector of Trier formed a sort of bridgehead into the surrounding sovereign territory of Luxembourg. In 1673 the castle, still owned by the Electorate, was finally destroyed by French troops.

Today: the ruins of the Oberburg were thoroughly renovated in 1921 by the municipality of Manderscheid, on whose land it stands, and it is open to the public.

== Niederburg ==
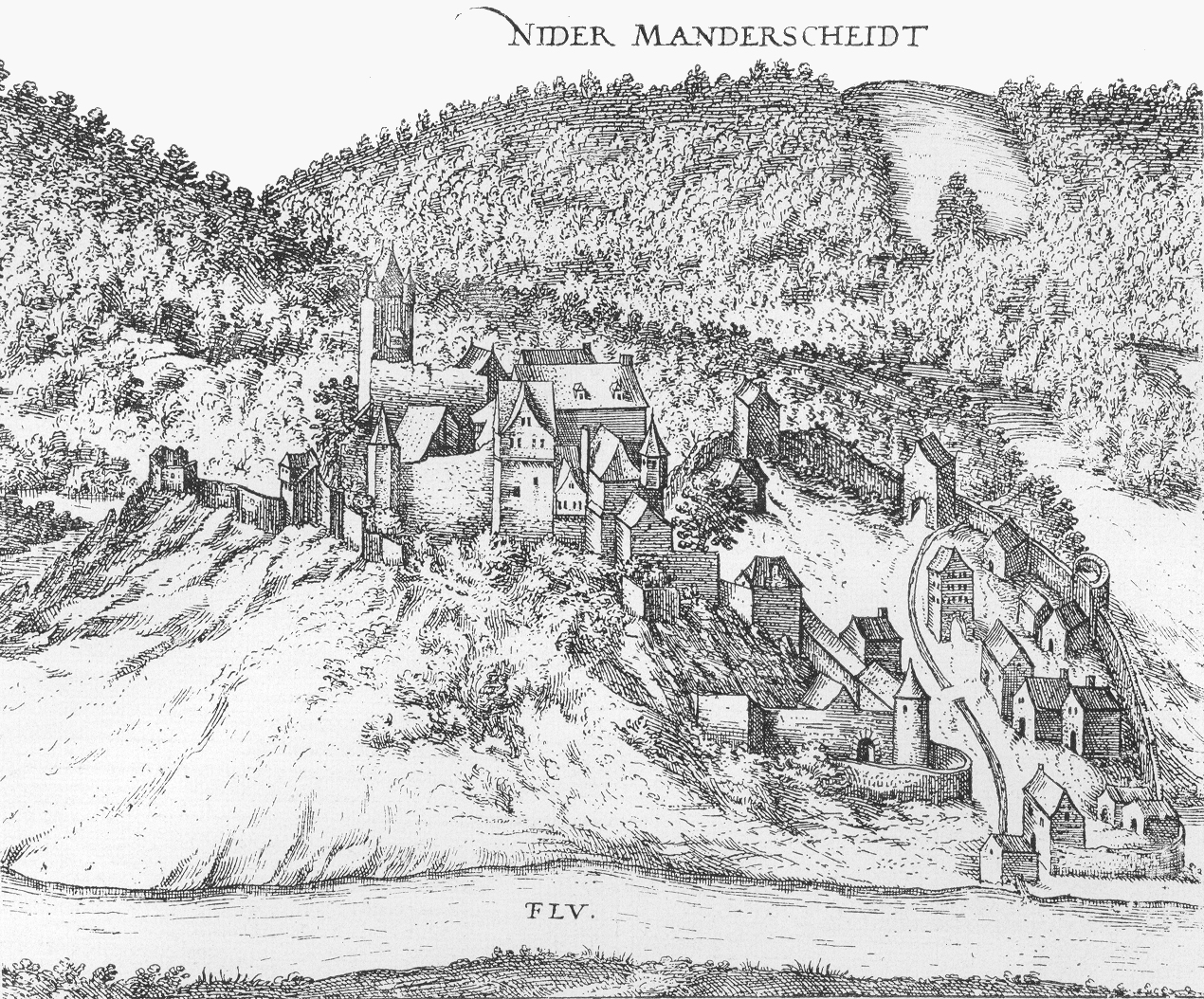
Niederburg: 1576 engraving by Frans Hogenberg

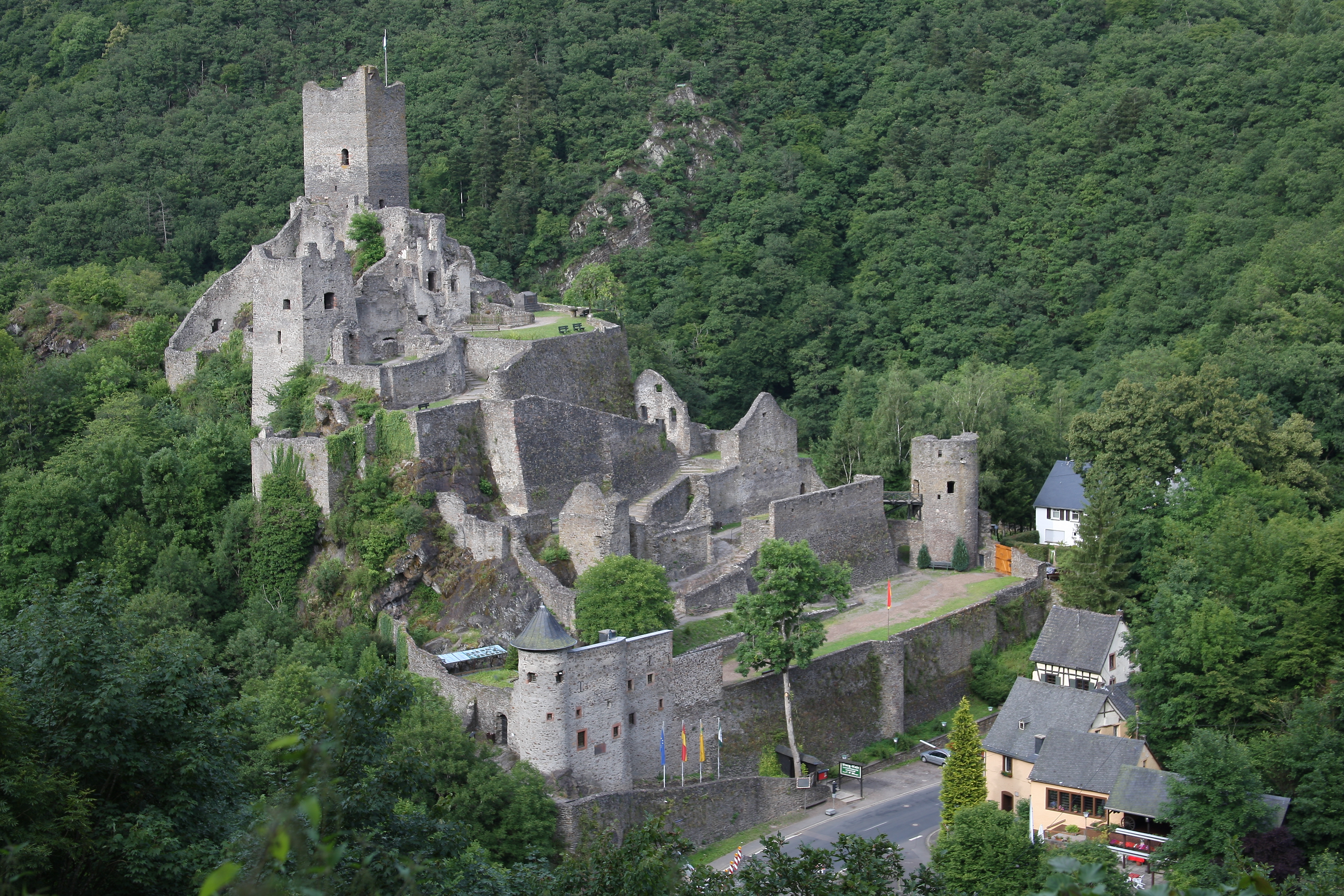
Ruins of the Niederburg

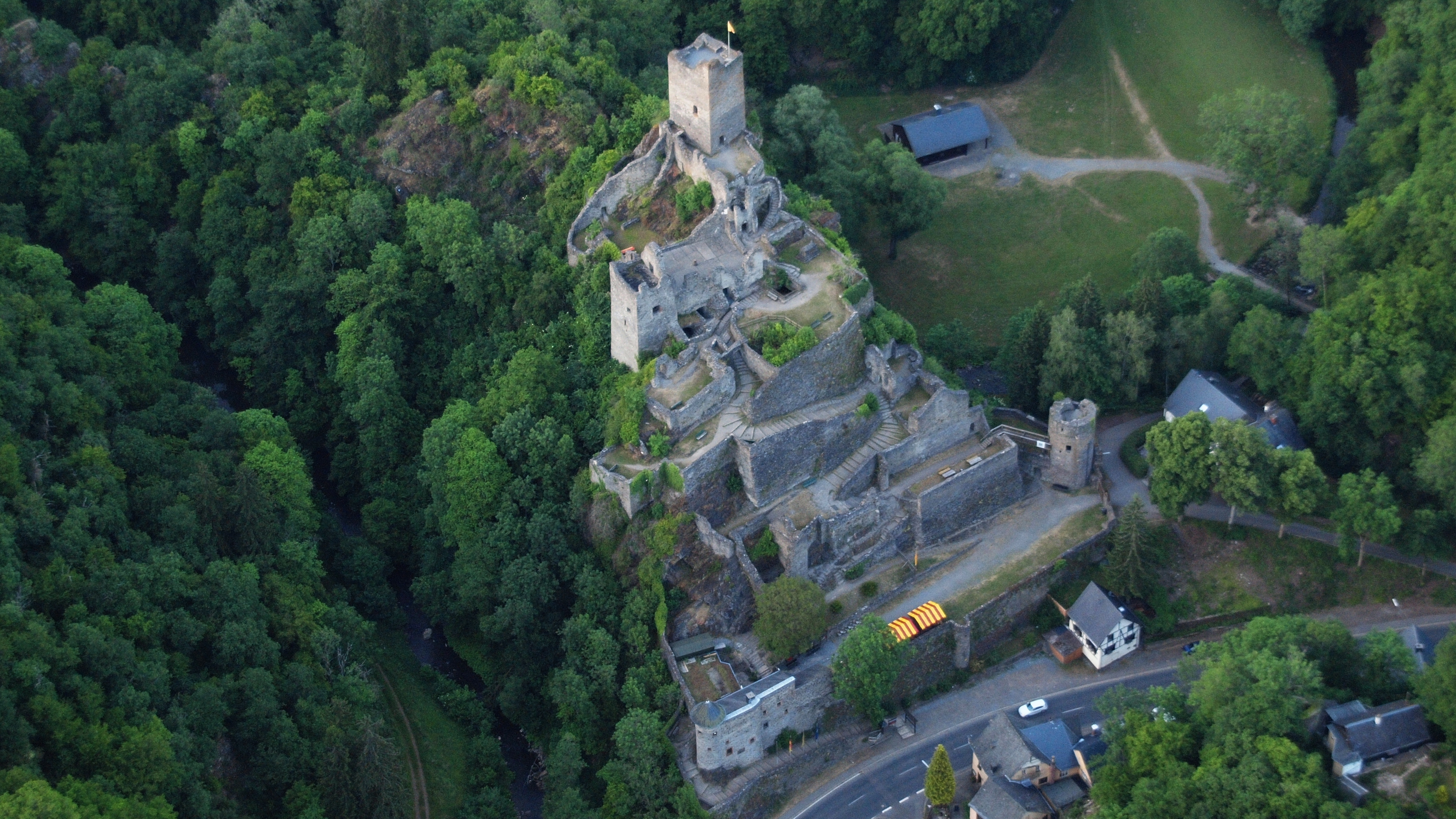
Niederburg, 2015 aerial photograph

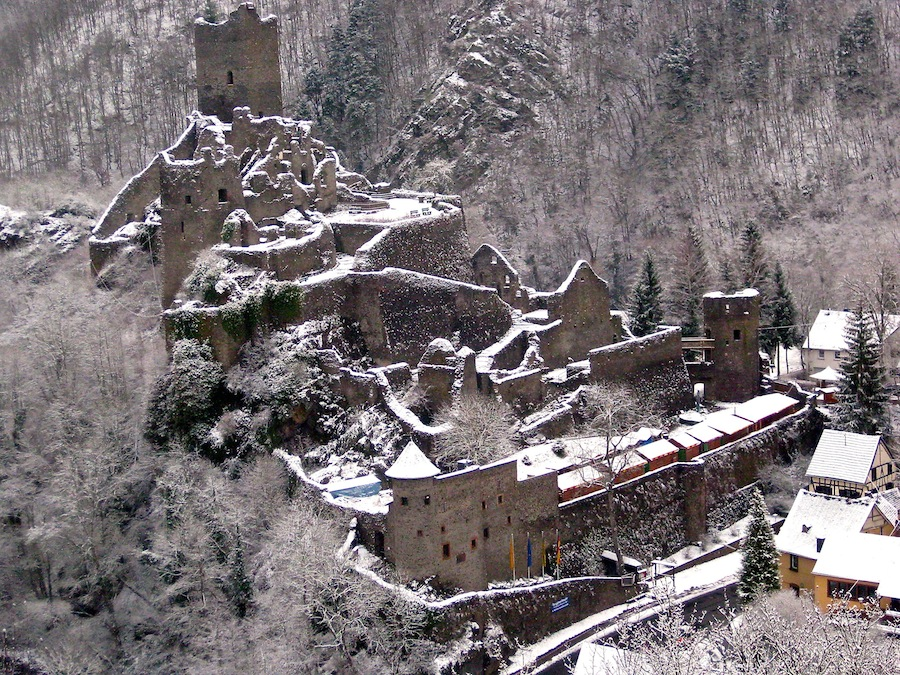
The Niederburg in winter

Today: the ruins of the Niederburg have been owned since 1899 by the Eifel Club and the club has slowly, but continually, restored them. They may be visited daily during the summer months. Guided group tours are also possible on request. The castle may also be booked for private events such as weddings. On the last weekend in August every year there is a medieval festival at the castle and the adjacent jousting field which receives about 15,000 visitors.
