= Eifel Club =

Hiking club

- Eifelverein
- Founded: 22 May 1888 in Bad Bertrich
- Purpose: Local historical and cultural activity; nature conservation, countryside and environmental conservation; structural support; youth and family work; international relationships
- Headquarters: Prüm
- Members: 28,000
- President: Mathilde Weinandy
- Chief executive: Manfred Rippinger
- Website: eifelverein.de

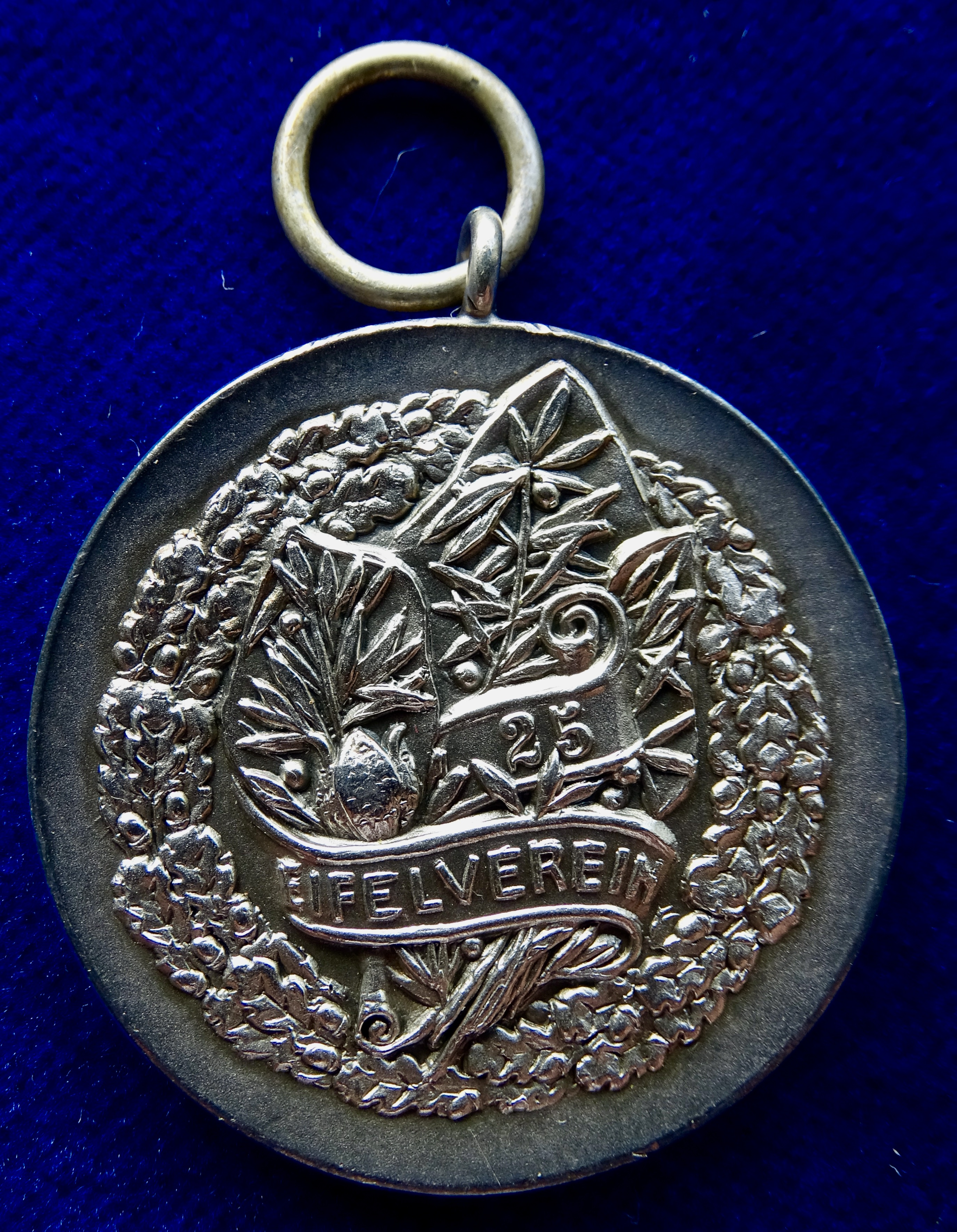
Eifel Club 25th anniversary medal 1913, obverse

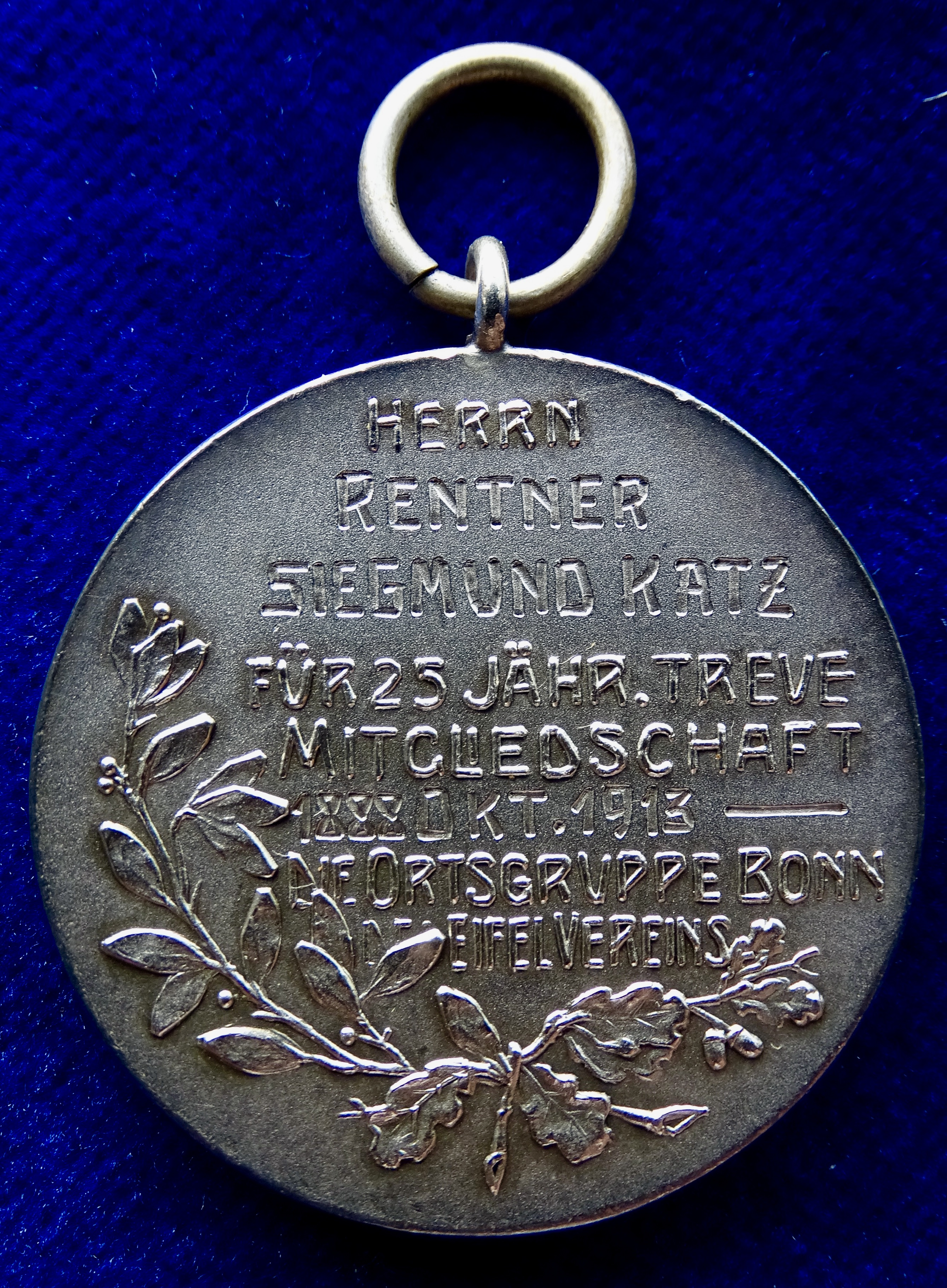
The reverse of this medal dedicated to the Jewish member Siegmund Katz (1838 Bonn - 1928)

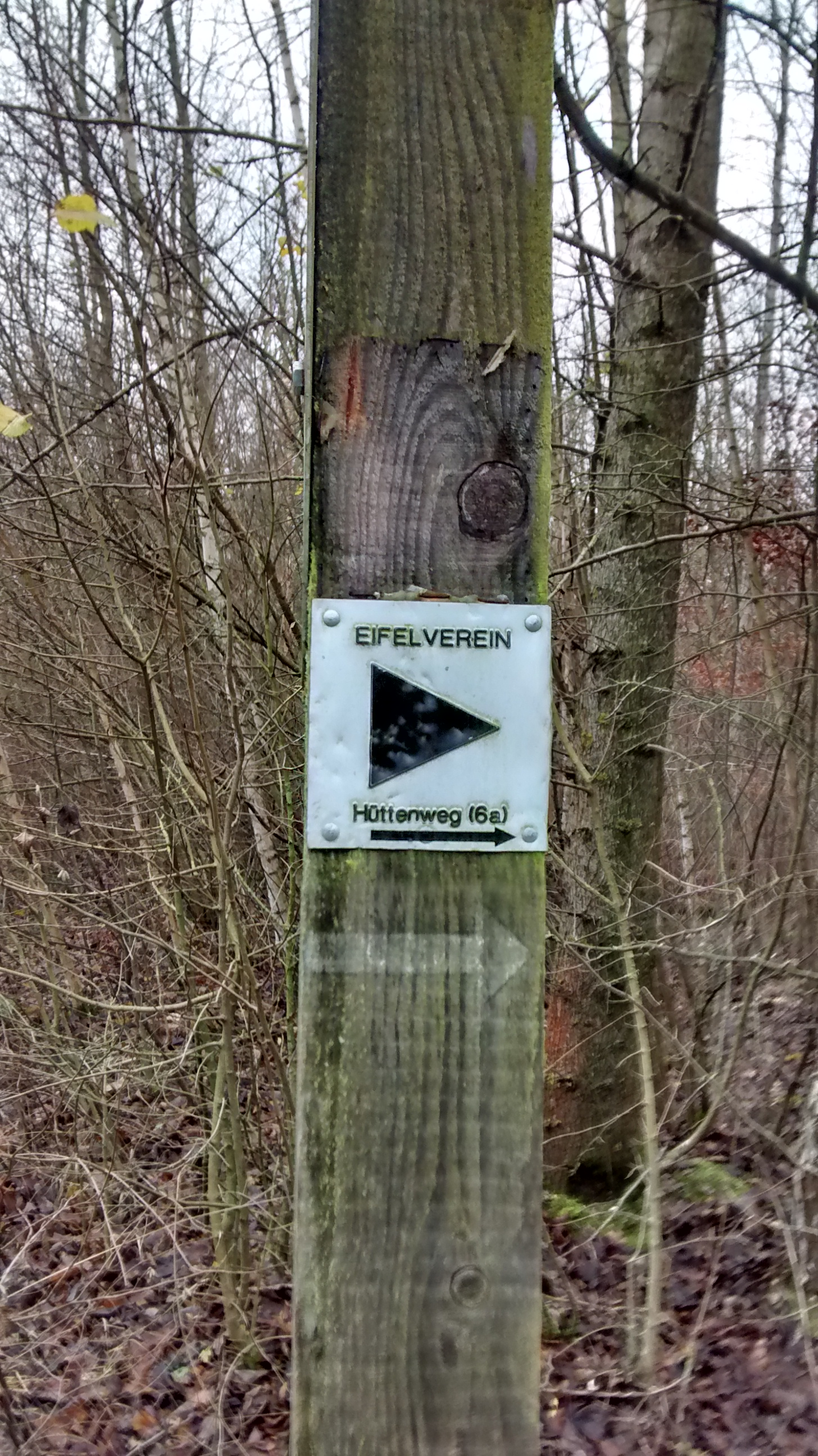
A waysign erected by the Eifel Club on a path in Eschweiler

The Eifel Club (German: Eifelverein) is one of the largest rambling clubs in Germany with a membership of 28.000. Its purpose is the "maintenance of local customs, the protection and care of monuments to which it is particularly committed".

The Eifel Club was founded on 22 May 1888 in the event hall at Bad Bertrich by Adolf Dronke and, in 2013, it celebrated its 125th anniversary. Karl Kaufmann, after whom one of the main footpaths through the Eifel (the Karl Kaufmann Way between Brühl and Trier) is named, was its chairman for many years, from 1904 to 1938. Since 2011, its president has been local politician, Mathilde Weinandy.

Among its areas of activity are rambling, the training of hiking guides, nature conservation, the conservation of local culture and youth work. In addition to various books, hiking maps and route guides, it publishes the "Eifel Yearbook" and, at irregular intervals, roughly five times a year, the members' magazine Die Eifel. The Eifel Club, together with the History and Ancient History Society of Mayen and the surrounding area, the town of Mayen and the county of Mayen-Koblenz supports the Eifel Museum in the castle of Genovevaburg in Mayen. It also runs the youth hostel of "Schilsbachtal" by the Rur Reservoir Schwammenauel in Simmerath-Woffelsbach. Since 1899, the club has owned the lower ward of the castle at Manderscheid, the ruins of which it has since carefully renovated and also made available for events.

The Eifel Club is the German sponsor of the European Agreement for the Eifel and Ardennes (EVEA), to which Belgium, Luxembourg and Germany have belonged since 1955. France was also a founder member but left in 1998. From 1983 to 1993 the Eifel Club organised the Euregio Star Walk at the tripoint of Vaals, where the borders of the Belgium, Germany and the Netherlands meet.

The head office of the club, which has 160 local branches, is in the town of Düren.

== Literature ==
- Wolfgang Schmid (ed. for Eifel Club): 125 Jahre Eifelverein : Vol. 1: Der Eifelverein auf seinem Weg durch die Geschichte, Düren, 2013, ISBN 978-3-921805-90-9
- Eifelverein (publ): Die Eifel 1888-1988. Zum 100-jährigen Jubiläum des Eifelvereins. Düren, 1988, ISBN 3-921805-17-1
- Alfred Herrmann (ed): Eifel-Festschrift. Zur 25-jährigen Jubelfeier des Eifelvereins. Bonn, 1913
