= Stromberg (Ripsdorf) =

Circular rampart site

- Ripsdorf

Site information
- Type: hill castle, motte
- Code: DE-NW
- Condition: Reste

Location
- Coordinates: 50°23′39″N 6°38′12″E
- Height: 559 m above sea level (NHN)

Site history
- Materials: Sandstone and basalt

The fortification on the Stromberg near Ripsdorf in the German state of North Rhine-Westphalia is a circular rampart site, which may have been a Celtic refuge fort.

== Location ==
The Stromberg hillfort lies in the North Eifel in the area of the municipality of Blankenheim about 1.6 km northwest of the village of Ripsdorf and 1.8 km (each as the crow flies) northeast of Waldorf. The hillfort site is situated on the Stromberg (559 m above sea level (NHN)), one of the highest hills of the upper Ahr valley. To the south, the Schaafbach stream runs past the Blankenheim hamlet of Ahrmühle and the Ripsdorf Mill. Maps give the height within the fort variously as 559.0 m and 558.2 m.

== Description ==
The almost circular rampart, which measures about 215 metres wide from west to east and 240 metres long from north to south, surrounds the plateau of the Stromberg which drops steeply away on all sides. The banks, which are made of sandstone and basalt blocks were uncovered when the Rhenish State Museum in Bonn picked up responsibility for area monuments in 1979, but it has not been further investigated. According to Herzog they may be part of a prehistoric Celtic refuge fort.

Linked to this site, roughly 145 metres away to the north, is an artificial hill with a surrounding moat. The site, which is nearly 55 metres wide, is suggested by Herzog to be a medieval motte and bailey castle based on its dimensions. In the vicinity of both fortifications there are remains of a former ore mine.
