= Lessenich (Mechernich) =

- Village of Mechernich
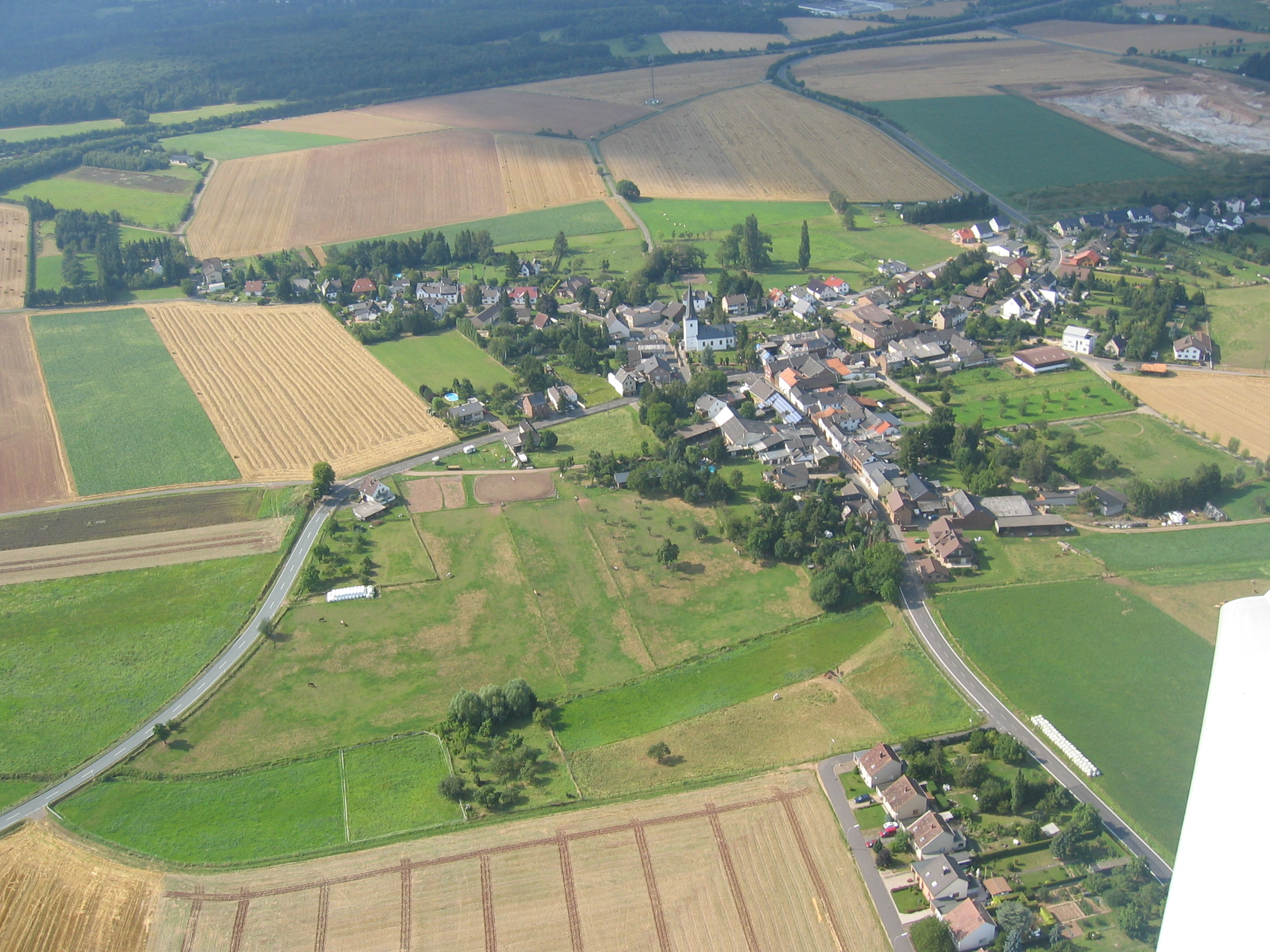

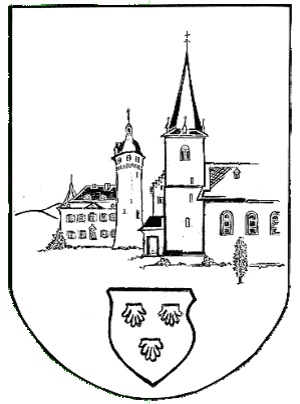
- Coat of arms
- Interactive map of Lessenich
- Location within Germany Location within North Rhine-Westphalia
- Coordinates: 50°36′30″N 6°43′18″E
- Country: Germany
- State: North Rhine-Westphalia
- District: Euskirchen
- Town: Mechernich
- Elevation: 230–260 m (750–850 ft)

Population (2020)
  - Total: 382
- Time zone: UTC+01:00 (CET)
  - Summer (DST): UTC+02:00 (CEST)
- Postal codes: 53894
- Dialling codes: 02256

Lessenich is a small village at the northern rim of the Eifel hill chain. It belongs to the town of Mechernich in the district of Euskirchen. Lessenich is situated in the centre of the triangle of Mechernich, Euskirchen und Bad Münstereifel. The Roman Eifel Aqueduct to Cologne and the Bundesautobahn 1 both are along the villages area. The three castles Burg Zievel, Burg Veynau and Burg Satzvey are in the villages surroundings.
