= Hillesheim =

- Town
- Coat of arms

- Location of Hillesheim within Vulkaneifel district
- Interactive map of Hillesheim
- Location within Germany Location within Rhineland-Palatinate
- Coordinates: 50°17′35″N 6°40′30″E
- Country: Germany
- State: Rhineland-Palatinate
- District: Vulkaneifel
- Municipal assoc.: Gerolstein
- Subdivisions: 2

Government
  - Mayor (2019–24): Gabriele Braun

Area
  - Total: 20.66 km^{2} (7.98 sq mi)
- Elevation: 440 m (1,440 ft)

Population (2025-12-31)
  - Total: 3,202
  - Density: 155.0/km^{2} (401.4/sq mi)
- Time zone: UTC+01:00 (CET)
  - Summer (DST): UTC+02:00 (CEST)
- Postal codes: 54576
- Dialling codes: 06593
- Vehicle registration: DAU
- Website: www.hillesheim.de

Hillesheim (German pronunciation: [ˈhɪləshaɪm]) is the third largest town in the Vulkaneifel district in Rhineland-Palatinate, Germany. It was the seat of the former Verbandsgemeinde Hillesheim.

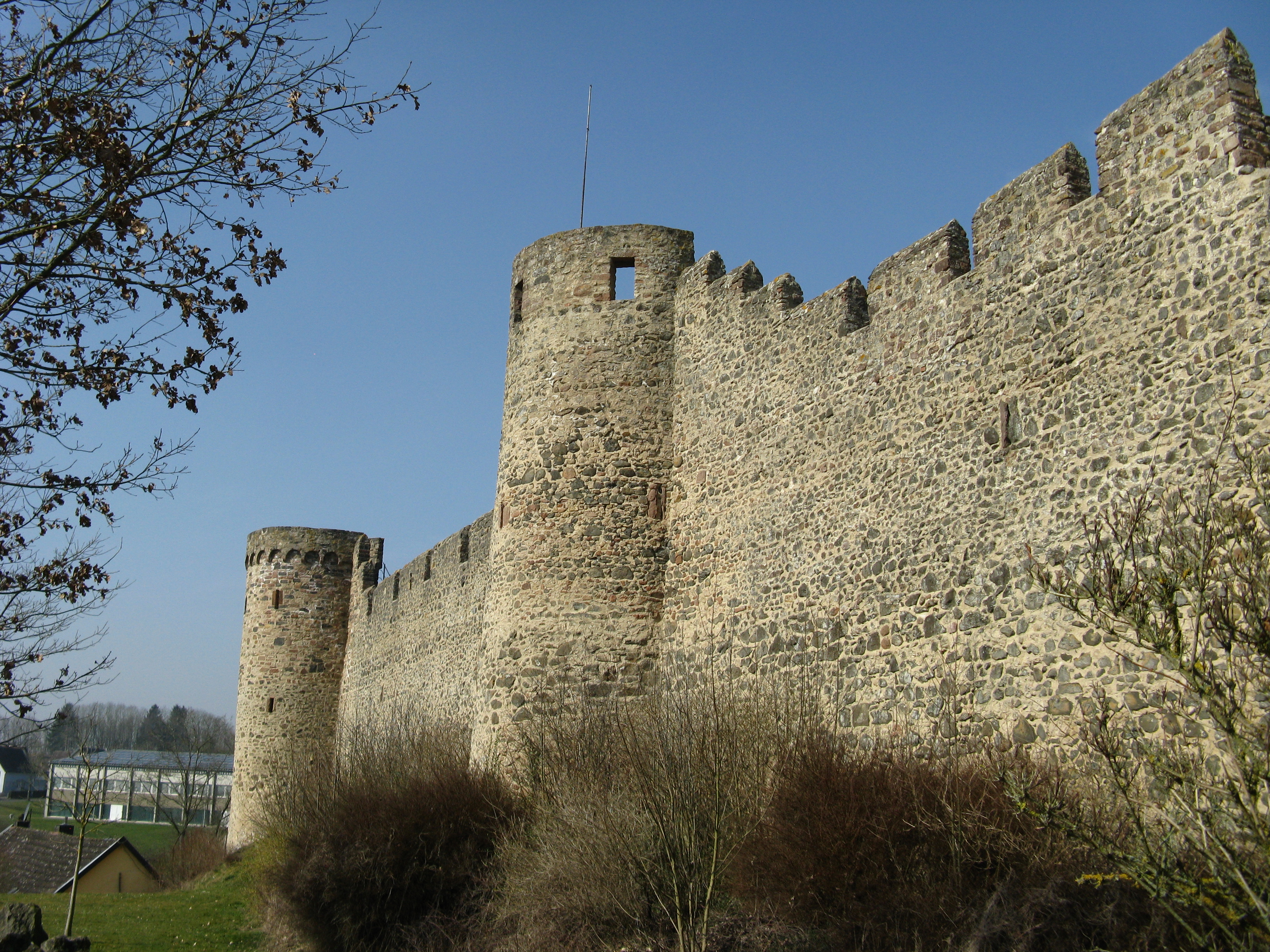
The old city walls

== Geography ==
=== Location ===
The town lies almost in the middle, halfway between Cologne and Trier (70 km from the former and 60 km from the latter, as the crow flies), and only 30 km from the Belgian border. Hillesheim lies in the Vulkaneifel, a part of the Eifel known for its volcanic history, geographical and geological features, and even ongoing activity today, including gases that sometimes well up from the earth.

=== Constituent communities ===
Hillesheim's outlying Stadtteile are Niederbettingen and Bolsdorf.

== History ==
Hillesheim is an old market town in the heart of the Eifel dating back more than a thousand years.

On 17 March 1974, the until then self-administering municipalities of Niederbettingen and Bolsdorf were amalgamated with Hillesheim. On 24 October 1993, Hillesheim was granted town rights.

== Politics ==
=== Town council ===
The council is made up of 20 council members, who were elected by proportional representation at the municipal election held on 7 June 2009, and the honorary mayor as chairman.

The municipal election held on 7 June 2009 yielded the following results:

Year	SPD	CDU	FWG 1	FWG 2	Total
2009	2	6	6	6	20 seats

=== Coat of arms ===
The German blazon reads: Schild durch eine geschweifte Spitze dreigeteilt; vorn in Silber ein rotes Kreuz, hinten in Gold eine schwarze Wolfsangel, unten in Blau über goldenem Halbmond eine silberne Madonna mit Kind, je mit goldenem Nimbus.

The town's arms can in English heraldic language be described thus: Tierced in mantle, dexter Argent a cross Gules, sinister Or a cramp Sable and in base Azure standing on a crescent of the third the Madonna and Child of the first, both with nimbus of the third, ensigning the shield a wall masoned, embattled of five and embowed with an arched gateway of the first.

Hillesheim was from 1352 to 1794 the northernmost outpost of the Archbishopric of Trier. This was made clear to all in that time by the town walls, which were particularly imposing for the Eifel. This small town grew with the building of the town walls in the 13th century into a regionally influential town. Marking this is the so-called Mauerkrone – "wall crown" – on top of ("ensigning") the escutcheon (although curiously, the German blazon does not mention this part of the arms).

The cross on the dexter (armsbearer's right, viewer's left) side is the Electoral-Trier armorial bearing, referring to that state's rule over the town in feudal times. The "cramp", as it is called in English heraldry, or Wolfsangel as it is known in German heraldry, seen on the sinister (armsbearer's left, viewer's right) side, is a charge seen in several coats of arms borne by a particular Hillesheim family, some of whom functioned as Schöffen (roughly "lay jurists"). The Madonna in the base was already to be found in the old town seal from 1306, reappearing on Schöffen seals in the 14th and 15th centuries. These Madonna seals were in use until the late 18th century, and thus the Madonna was always closely bound to the townsfolk.

== Culture and sightseeing ==
The town is one of the few European Model Towns and its renovation works are therefore subsidized by the town's urban development promotion programme. There is a mediaeval town centre partly surrounded by a town wall and with a church worth seeing for its Baroque organ from 1772, built by the famous Stumm family, annually attracting talented international organists. Hillesheim's municipal area is almost round. From the historical town centre, the town broadened out in all directions, growing from its location in the valley through new building developments up to the surrounding slopes.

=== Buildings ===
==== Main town ====
- Antoniuskapelle (chapel), Koblenzer Straße, plaster building, apparently from 1735.
- Saint Martin's Catholic Parish Church, Graf-Mirbach-Platz 14, Classicist aisleless church, 1851–1852.
- Town fortifications, south side, eastern and western parts of the crenellated girding wall built about 1300 and raised in the early 16th century.
- Across the street from Am Alten Born 1 – wayside cross, sandstone shaft cross, latter half of 18th or early 19th century.
- Am Markt 14 – three-floor Late Historicist hotel building with elaborate façade, about 1900.
- Am Stockberg, graveyard, Father Pfriem's Gothic Revival tomb, about 1904, Baroque wayside cross, red sandstone, from 1814 (?).
- At Augustinerstraße 2 – wayside cross, sandstone beam cross, from 1731.
- Augustinerstraße 2 – former Augustinian hermit monastery, three-winged complex, 1721, now a hotel.
- Bachstraße 5 – house/inn, Late Classicist plaster building, apparently from 1886.
- Bahnhofstraße 3 – former railway station, reception building and goods shed, Reform architecture, about 1912.
- Burgstraße 12 – solid structure with timber-frame gable, Late Gothic window skirting, hall kitchen (?), possibly essentially 16th century.
- Grabenstraße/corner of Neutorstraße – sandstone Crucifixion Bildstock, from 1650 or 1656.
- Graf-Mirbach-Platz 17 – representative Late Historicist shop-house, about 1900.
- Near in Buch 6 – sandstone Crucifixion Bildstock, from 1624.
- Kölner Straße 10 – former Amt court, Gothic Revival, apparently from 1868/1878, expanded at the back.
- Königsberger Straße/corner of Prümer Straße – wayside cross shaft from 1624 and 1778.
- Near Lammersdorferstraße 15 – sandstone Bildstock from 1613.
- Schützenweg 1 – former tannery from 1826.
- Wallstraße 6 – two-floor solid structure with roof with half-hipped gables, about 1910.
- Former Oberbettingen-Hillesheim railway station, no number, built to standard plans, separate side building, about 1871.
- Former mill (?), Alter Bahnhof 1, three-floor plaster building
- Wayside cross, east of town on the road to Walsdorf, sandstone shaft cross from 1681 (? – last digit in inscription unclear), finial cross and pedestal new.
- Wayside crosses, southwest of town on the road to Oberbettingen, so-called Ablasskreuz ("Indulgence Cross") from the 16th century, sandstone pedestal cross from 1870, pedestal cross from 1949.

==== Bolsdorf ====
- Saint Margaret's Catholic Church (branch church), Margarethenstraße 3, triaxial aisleless church from the 17th century, expanded in 1887, quire and west tower from 1704, forsaken churchyard, quarrystone wall around complex.
- Across the street from Im Auel 4 – commercial building (former mill?), one-floor quarrystone building, possibly from earlier half of the 18th century or earlier.
- Im Auel 5 – two-floor dwelling and commercial building from the 19th century, trussing in the barn from 1672.
- Margarethenstraße 4 – house from the 18th century, oven porch.
- Graveyard, north of the village, Gothic Revival pillar cross from 1869.

==== Niederbettingen ====
- Heart of Jesus Catholic Parish Church (Pfarrkirche Herz-Jesu), Mühlenweg 3, Late Romanesque Revival basilica, 1897, architect Adam Rüppel, Bonn; churchyard with retaining wall, shaft cross from 1697, finial cross from 1698, Late Gothic door skirting, whole complex.
- Village fortifications, remnant of the former moated castle's girding wall from the High Middle Ages.
- At Burgring 7 – timber-frame barn, partly of quarrystone, possibly from the 18th century.
- Gartenweg 1 – estate complex, Baroque house about 1780 or 1790, stable from 1829, barn possibly from the same time.
- Gartenweg/corner of Burgring – wayside cross, shaft cross from 1660.
- Near Hauptstraße 23 – wayside cross, Rococo shaft cross from, once thought to be from 1709, but more likely later.
- Mühlenweg 4 – former mill (?), stately building with roof with half-hipped gables, about 1800.
- Wayside cross, south of the village in the woods near town limits, shaft cross from 1693.
- Wayside cross, northwest of the village on the old road to Oberbettingen, shaft cross from 1666.
- Wayside cross, southwest of and above the village in a meadow, sandstone shaft cross from the 18th century.

== Economy and infrastructure ==
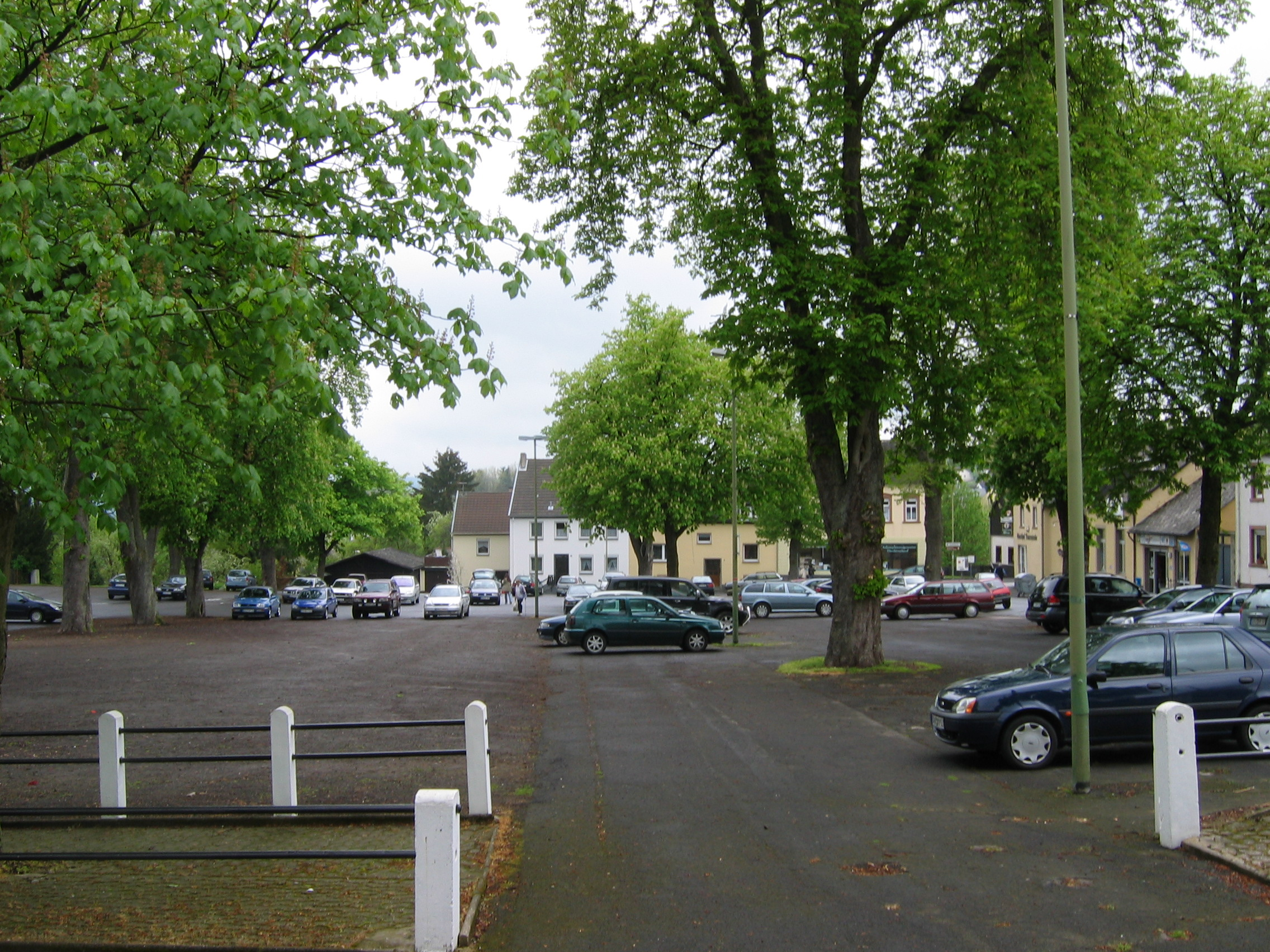
Hillesheim Marketplace

For a rural middle centre, Hillesheim has good infrastructure at its disposal with three schools, two sport halls, one tennis hall, one indoor swimming pool, a cinema, several supermarkets and filling stations and a building centre.

=== Transport ===
==== Rail ====
Oberbettingen-Hillesheim railway station lies on the Eifelbahn (Cologne–Euskirchen–Gerolstein–Trier), which is served by the following local passenger services:

- the Eifel-Express (Cologne–Euskirchen–Gerolstein with connection to Trier);
- the Eifel-Bahn (Cologne–Euskirchen–Kall, and at peak times on to Gerolstein).

For all local public transport, three tariff systems apply: the Verkehrsverbund Region Trier (VRT), the Verkehrsverbund Rhein-Sieg, and for journeys crossing tariff zones, the NRW-Tarif.

==== Road ====
The resident population is hoping that the gap in the A 1 between Daun-Rengen and Blankenheim in North Rhine-Westphalia will be filled, as all traffic currently rolls through Hillesheim, thereby causing very busy road conditions, especially on Fridays. On the other hand, this does conflict with local retailers' interests, for they have been profiting from spontaneous purchases made by those passing through town for a long time.

=== Established businesses ===
Hillesheim is headquarters to the KBV-Verlag (publishing house).

=== Tourism ===
The town of Hillesheim is a tourist destination, above all for visitors from North Rhine-Westphalia and the Netherlands.

Besides the mediaeval town centre with its church, foremost among sights worth seeing is the "Bolsdorfer Tälchen" recreational area, where a lake, hiking loops, leisure activities and pubs on the town's outskirts invite visitors.

The network of paths in the "Bolsdorfer Tälchen" is also a direct link to the Kylltal Cycle Path, which leads more than 115 km from the Kronenburg reservoir to the Kyll's mouth on the Moselle in Trier-Ehrang. Hillesheim is a "station" on the Eifel-Krimi-Wanderweg ("Eifel Crime Fiction Hiking Trail"), which is based on books by crime fiction authors Jacques Berndorf and Ralf Kramp.

The Geopfad Hillesheim, at 30 stations in the town's vicinity, casts light on the Eifel's geology and on the evidence of vulcanism in the Vulkaneifel.

=== Public institutions ===
==== Administration ====
In Hillesheim is the administrative seat of the Verbandsgemeinde of Hillesheim, which by population is the district's second smallest Verbandsgemeinde, after the Verbandsgemeinde of Kelberg.

==== Education ====
In Hillesheim are two kindergartens, one primary school, one Hauptschule and one Realschule. The folk high school is run on a volunteer basis by the KEB Bildungswerk Hillesheim - Katholische Erwachsenenbildung.

==== Social services ====
There are a home for the aged and St.-Josefs-Haus, where assisted living is available.

== Notable people ==
- Maria Mies (1931–2023), professor of sociology
- Annelie Runge (1943– ), film producer, screenplay writer and journalist
- Stefan Drößler (1961– ), film historian, museum director and film restorer
