= Kordel =

- Municipality
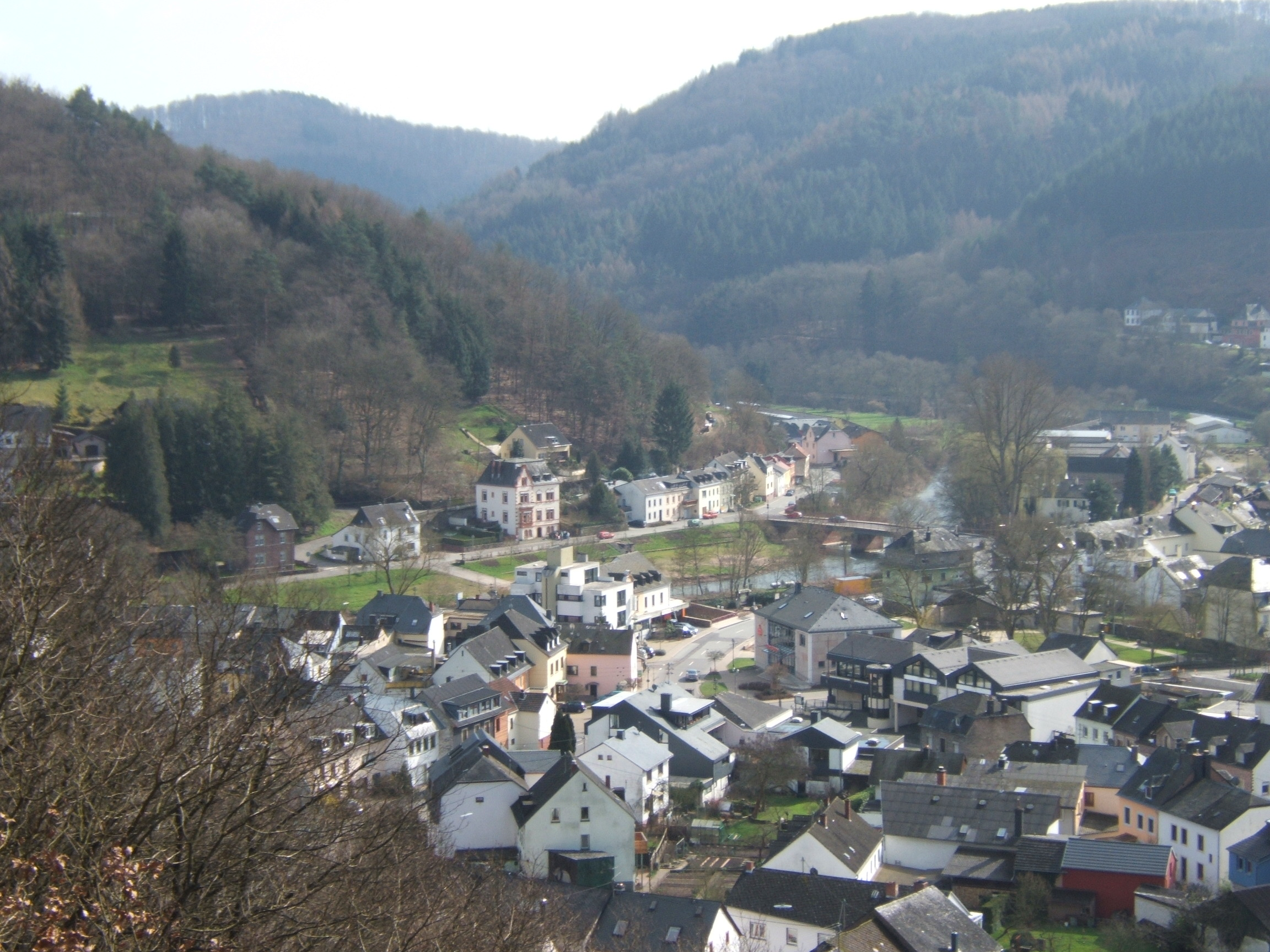

- Coat of arms

- Location of Kordel within Trier-Saarburg district
- Interactive map of Kordel
- Location within Germany Location within Rhineland-Palatinate
- Coordinates: 49°50′28″N 6°38′7″E
- Country: Germany
- State: Rhineland-Palatinate
- District: Trier-Saarburg
- Municipal assoc.: Trier-Land
- Subdivisions: 3

Government
  - Mayor (2019–24): Medard Roth

Area
  - Total: 16.60 km^{2} (6.41 sq mi)
- Elevation: 140 m (460 ft)

Population (2025-12-31)
  - Total: 2,004
  - Density: 120.7/km^{2} (312.7/sq mi)
- Time zone: UTC+01:00 (CET)
  - Summer (DST): UTC+02:00 (CEST)
- Postal codes: 54306
- Dialling codes: 06505
- Vehicle registration: TR
- Website: www.gemeinde-kordel.de

Kordel is a municipality in the Trier-Saarburg district, in Rheinland-Pfalz, Germany.

It is home to the ruins of Ramstein Castle.

Kordel was severely affected by the 2021 European floods.
