= Eicks =

- Ortsteil of Mechernich
- Interactive map of Eicks
- Location within Germany Location within North Rhine-Westphalia
- Coordinates: 50°37′N 6°37′E
- Country: Germany
- State: North Rhine-Westphalia
- Admin. region: Köln
- District: Euskirchen
- Town: Mechernich
- Elevation: 322 m (1,056 ft)

Population (2020)
  - Total: 530
- Time zone: UTC+01:00 (CET)
  - Summer (DST): UTC+02:00 (CEST)
- Postal codes: 53894
- Dialling codes: 02443
- Vehicle registration: EU
- Website: City of Mechernich - Eicks

Eicks is a village belonging to the town of Mechernich in the district of Euskirchen in the south of the state of North Rhine-Westphalia, Germany. It is located near the "Nationalpark Nordeifel" in the Eifel hills, approx. 15 km south-west of Euskirchen and 56 km from Cologne.
