= Hillesheim (Verbandsgemeinde) =

Verbandsgemeinde in Rhineland-Palatinate, Germany

Coordinates: 50.293°N 6.675°E

Hillesheim is a former Verbandsgemeinde ("collective municipality") in the district Vulkaneifel, in Rhineland-Palatinate, Germany. The seat of the Verbandsgemeinde was in Hillesheim. In January 2019 it was merged into the Verbandsgemeinde Gerolstein.

The Verbandsgemeinde Hillesheim consisted of the following Ortsgemeinden ("local municipalities"):

1. Basberg
2. Berndorf
3. Dohm-Lammersdorf
4. Hillesheim
5. Kerpen
6. Nohn
7. Oberbettingen
8. Oberehe-Stroheich
9. Üxheim
10. Walsdorf
11. Wiesbaum
