= Oberbettingen =

- Municipality
- Coat of arms

- Location of Oberbettingen within Vulkaneifel district
- Interactive map of Oberbettingen
- Location within Germany Location within Rhineland-Palatinate
- Coordinates: 50°17′10.57″N 6°37′40.84″E
- Country: Germany
- State: Rhineland-Palatinate
- District: Vulkaneifel
- Municipal assoc.: Gerolstein

Government
  - Mayor (2019–24): Hans-Jakob Meyer

Area
  - Total: 6.17 km^{2} (2.38 sq mi)
- Elevation: 413 m (1,355 ft)

Population (2025-12-31)
  - Total: 758
  - Density: 123/km^{2} (318/sq mi)
- Time zone: UTC+01:00 (CET)
  - Summer (DST): UTC+02:00 (CEST)
- Postal codes: 54578
- Dialling codes: 06593
- Vehicle registration: DAU

Oberbettingen is an Ortsgemeinde – a municipality belonging to a Verbandsgemeinde, a kind of collective municipality – in the Vulkaneifel district in Rhineland-Palatinate, Germany. It belongs to the Verbandsgemeinde of Gerolstein, whose seat is in the like-named town.

== Geography ==
The municipality lies on a flat expanse in the valley of the river Kyll in the Vulkaneifel, a part of the Eifel known for its volcanic history, geographical and geological features, and even ongoing activity today, including gases that sometimes well up from the earth.

== History ==
In 845, Bettingen, or more specifically, Niederbettingen Castle, had its first documentary mention in a document from King Lothar by way of St. Maximin’s Abbey in Trier. In the Middle Ages, the village belonged to the House of Bettingen, under whom were the Counts of Blankenheim, Manderscheid and Gerolstein. About 1470, Oberbettingen was made subject to the County of Gerolstein. Some of the earlier Lords of Bettingen were the Abbot of Prüm in 1077, Wirich von Bettingen in 1157 and Theobald von Bettingen in 1158.

Under French rule (1794-1814), Oberbettingen was assigned to the mayor of the Mairie (“Mayoralty”) of Lissendorf in the like-named canton. Even later, under Prussian administration, the village was still administered by Lissendorf.

Oberbettingen was until 1750 an autonomous parish. Ever since, it has belonged to the Parish of Niederbettingen, a constituent community of the town of Hillesheim. The former parish church, Saint Nicholas’s, now serves only as a chapel of ease. There was a conversion of the quire in 1827 and of the nave in 1841. The churchtower was built higher in 1937 to accommodate another bell. In 1960 came more expansion work on the nave, and the adjoining rectory was built. Venerated in Oberbettingen is the Irish saint Brigid of Kildare, patron saint of livestock, and for decades, on 1 February – Saint Brigid’s feast day – pilgrims from all the surrounding villages would come in processions to Oberbettingen.

In 1815, after the Congress of Vienna assigned the area to the Kingdom of Prussia, the Rhine Province was founded. This lasted until Germany’s defeat in the Second World War. In 1816, districts (Kreise) were formed, and uninterruptedly ever since, Oberbettingen has belonged to the district of Daun, although this was given a new name – Vulkaneifel – in 2007.

In 1873, the Ehrang – Kalscheuren (Trier – Cologne) railway came into service with the opening of the railway station in Hillesheim’s outlying centre of Alter Bahnhof (whose name means “Old Railway Station”). This lasted until the opening of the Ahrtalbahn (another railway) in 1912, when the local station became Hillesheim-Oberbettingen – and then later Oberbettingen-Hillesheim.

In 1899, a grant of 1,500 Marks was mentioned for the meadowlands in the Kyll valley, which existed until the Flurbereinigung in 1952. In the same year, the Oberbettingen volunteer fire brigade was also founded. In 1903, a new two-class school building was built, replacing the hitherto one-room school at the house still found today at Am Bach 5. In 1913 a new graveyard, Friedhof Auf Kringelsrech, came into use. Until then, there had only been the graveyard behind the chapel, where the rectory now stands. In 1914, the new waterworks came into being. The water was fed by gravity into a cistern and thence into the supply network.

Founded in 1921 was the Oberbettingen savings and loan institution of Friedrich Wilhelm Raiffeisen and Georg Friedrich Dasbach. In 1922 came the first electricity supply to Oberbettingen, from Niederbettingen. As soon as the next year, Oberbettingen was connected to the Schleiden district network (later RWE).

In 1936 came the introduction of the first Flurbereinigung measures, but they were interrupted by the Second World War in 1939.

On 5 March 1945, United States forces seized Oberbettingen and crossed the Kyll on a Bailey bridge, whereupon the frontline turned its attention towards Hillesheim across the unoccupied “Kyll Position”.

Along with the whole Regierungsbezirk of Trier, the district of Daun (now Vulkaneifel) was assigned to the French Zone of Occupation. Since 1946, the municipality has been part of the then newly founded state of Rhineland-Palatinate.

In 1946, the sport club FC Oberbettingen 1946 e. V. was founded.

In 1952, first Flurbereinigung measures, begun before the war, were finished. The second round was completed in 1987.

In 1970, in the course of administrative restructuring in Rhineland-Palatinate, Oberbettingen, along with Basberg, Mirbach and Wiesbaum, was transferred from the Amt of Lissendorf to the Verbandsgemeinde of Hillesheim. In 1979, classes ended at the three-room Oberbettingen primary school and scholastic operations were merged with the Hillesheim primary school.

== Politics ==
=== Municipal council ===
The council is made up of 12 council members, who were elected by proportional representation at the municipal election held on 7 June 2009, and the honorary mayor as chairman.

The municipal election held on 7 June 2009 yielded the following results:

| Year | SPD | WG Meyer | Total |
|---|---|---|---|
| 2009 | 4 | 8 | 12 seats |
| 2004 | 3 | 9 | 12 seats |

=== Mayor ===
Oberbettingen’s mayor is Hans-Jakob Meyer.

=== Coat of arms ===
The German blazon reads: In Silber, bestreut mit blauen Fadenkreuzchen, ein blauer Zickzack- Schrägbalken.

The municipality’s arms might in English heraldic language be described thus: Argent semée of crosses a bend dancetty azure.

The arms are those formerly borne by the dynastic House of Bettingen, which took its name from the municipality almost 900 years ago. The municipality has now taken the lords’ arms from them.

== Culture and sightseeing ==
Buildings:

- Saint Nicholas’s Catholic Church (branch church; Filialkirche St. Nikolaus), Prümer Straße – quire 1827, aisleless church 1841; red sandstone beam cross from 1736; grave crosses from the 18th century.
- Marienstraße 6 – former school, partly timber-frame, partly slated, early 20th century, old retaining wall facing street.
- Prümer Straße 52 – estate along the street from 1767 (?), lengthened in the 19th century, stable, bakehouse, stable-barn.
- Wayside cross, southeast of the village on the old way to Niederbettingen, sandstone shaft cross from 1756.
- Wayside cross, southwest of the village at the edge of the woods, Baroque sandstone shaft cross from 1672.
- Wayside cross, west of the village on the heights, shaft cross from 1736, new finishing cross.
- Wayside cross, south of the village on a farm lane following the old Roman road, sandstone pedestal, cast-iron crucifix, about 1900.

== Economy and infrastructure ==
Oberbettingen-Hillesheim railway station lies on the Eifelbahn (Cologne–Euskirchen–Gerolstein–Trier), which is served by the following local passenger services:

- the Eifel-Express (Cologne–Euskirchen–Gerolstein with connection to Trier);
- the Eifel-Bahn (Cologne–Euskirchen–Kall, and at peak times on to Gerolstein).

For all local public transport, three tariff systems apply: the Verkehrsverbund Region Trier (VRT), the Verkehrsverbund Rhein-Sieg, and for journeys crossing tariff zones, the NRW-Tarif.
