= Kalenborn-Scheuern =

- Municipality
- Coat of arms

- Location of Kalenborn-Scheuern within Vulkaneifel district
- Interactive map of Kalenborn-Scheuern
- Location within Germany Location within Rhineland-Palatinate
- Coordinates: 50°15′34″N 6°36′11″E
- Country: Germany
- State: Rhineland-Palatinate
- District: Vulkaneifel
- Municipal assoc.: Gerolstein

Government
  - Mayor (2019–24): Rita Hoffmann

Area
  - Total: 7.34 km^{2} (2.83 sq mi)
- Elevation: 450 m (1,480 ft)

Population (2025-12-31)
  - Total: 383
  - Density: 52.2/km^{2} (135/sq mi)
- Time zone: UTC+01:00 (CET)
  - Summer (DST): UTC+02:00 (CEST)
- Postal codes: 54570
- Dialling codes: 06591
- Vehicle registration: DAU
- Website: www.kalenborn-scheuern.de

Kalenborn-Scheuern (German pronunciation: [ˈkaːlənbɔʁn ˈʃɔʏɐn]) is an Ortsgemeinde – a municipality belonging to a Verbandsgemeinde, a kind of collective municipality – in the Vulkaneifel district in Rhineland-Palatinate, Germany. It belongs to the Verbandsgemeinde of Gerolstein, whose seat is in the like-named town.

== Geography ==
=== Location ===
The municipality lies in the Vulkaneifel, a part of the Eifel known for its volcanic history, geographical and geological features, and even ongoing activity today, including gases that sometimes well up from the earth.

=== Constituent communities ===
Kalenborn-Scheuern’s Ortsteile are, as its name implies, Kalenborn and Scheuern.

== History ==
In 893, Kalenborn had its first documentary mention in Prüm Abbey’s directory of holdings, the Prümer Urbar, as de Caldebrunna

The municipality of Kalenborn was newly founded from the dissolved municipalities of Kalenborn and Scheuern on 7 June 1969. On 1 December of that same year, the name was changed to Kalenborn-Scheuern.

== Politics ==
=== Municipal council ===
The council is made up of 8 council members, who were elected by majority vote at the municipal election held on 7 June 2009, and the honorary mayor as chairman.

=== Mayor ===
Kalenborn-Scheuern’s mayor is Rita Hoffmann.

=== Coat of arms ===
The German blazon reads: Von Rot über Silber geteilt; oben drei goldene fächerförmige Weizenähren, unten ein blauer Ziehbrunnen.

The municipality’s arms might in English heraldic language be described thus: Per fess gules three ears of wheat, the dexter bendwise, the middle palewise and the sinister bendwise sinister Or, and argent a well with a roof and pail azure.

The three ears of wheat are, in a roundabout way, canting for the name “Scheuern”. Scheuern was, along with other neighbouring places, subject to tithing by Prüm Abbey, and indeed, the Abbey’s tithe barn stood in Scheuern, which drew its name from the building: Scheuer is Eifel dialect for what in High German is called a Scheune – a barn. Moreover, the ears of wheat also stand for the double municipality’s centuries-long root source of income, agriculture, and its rural structure. The charge below the line of partition is likewise canting. It stands for the name “Kalenborn”, which is held to have come from words meaning “cold well” or “cool spring” (the old form, Caldebrunna, is closer to the Modern High German words for this: kalter Brunnen). The blue well is meant to represent this graphically.

== Culture and sightseeing ==
=== Buildings ===
==== Kalenborn ====
- Saint Ignatius’s and Saint Wendelin’s Catholic Chapel (branch chapel; Filialkapelle St. Ignatius und St. Wendelin), small aisleless church from 1552 and 1642.
- Hauptstraße, graveyard, warriors’ memorial 1914-1918, possibly expanded after the Second World War.

==== Scheuern ====
- Saint Lawrence’s and Saint Matthew’s Catholic Church (branch church; Filialkirche St. Laurentius und St. Matthias), Hauptstraße, small Gothicized aisleless church, 1629.
- Hillesheimer Straße 13 – stately Baroque house, late 18th/early 19th century, oven porch.
- Wayside chapel, north of Scheuern, aisleless, 18th/19th century, Gothic Revival altar, red sandstone shaft cross from 1695.

== Economy and infrastructure ==
=== Transport ===
Kalenborn-Scheuern lies in the Verkehrsverbund Region Trier (VRT), whose fares therefore apply. The municipality is served on weekdays by bus route 522 of the Rhein-Mosel-Verkehrsgesellschaft linking the double village with the nearest town, Gerolstein, as well as with Hillesheim. The nearest railway station is Oberbettingen-Hillesheim on the Eifelbahn (Cologne–Euskirchen–Gerolstein–Trier) some 5 km to the northeast.

Bundesstraße 410 (Prüm–Mayen) lies some 6 km to the south, and Bundesstraße 421 (Stadtkyll–Daun) at the same distance to the northeast. The nearest Autobahn interchange is Prüm on the A 60 some 20 km to the southwest.
