= Feusdorf =

- Municipality
- Coat of arms

- Location of Feusdorf within Vulkaneifel district
- Interactive map of Feusdorf
- Location within Germany Location within Rhineland-Palatinate
- Coordinates: 50°21′04″N 6°36′41″E
- Country: Germany
- State: Rhineland-Palatinate
- District: Vulkaneifel
- Municipal assoc.: Gerolstein

Government
  - Mayor (2019–24): Franz-Josef Hilgers

Area
  - Total: 4.42 km^{2} (1.71 sq mi)
- Elevation: 518 m (1,699 ft)

Population (2025-12-31)
  - Total: 518
  - Density: 117/km^{2} (304/sq mi)
- Time zone: UTC+01:00 (CET)
  - Summer (DST): UTC+02:00 (CEST)
- Postal codes: 54584
- Dialling codes: 06597
- Vehicle registration: DAU
- Website: www.feusdorf.de

Feusdorf is an Ortsgemeinde – a municipality belonging to a Verbandsgemeinde, a kind of collective municipality – in the Vulkaneifel district in Rhineland-Palatinate, Germany. It belongs to the Verbandsgemeinde of Gerolstein, whose seat is in the municipality of Gerolstein.

== Geography ==
The municipality lies in the Vulkaneifel, a part of the Eifel known for its volcanic history, geographical and geological features, and even ongoing activity today, including gases that sometimes well up from the earth.

Feusdorf's area is 442 ha all together, of which cropfields and open water make up 78 ha, greenbelt and heath 203 ha, private property 26 ha, woods 105 ha, public roadways 26 ha and other lands 4 ha. Flurbereinigung was undertaken in 1968. Feusdorf lies at an elevation of 450 to 565 m above sea level.

== History ==
The municipality's name has been written several ways over the centuries: Feußdorf (1373), Freuhsdorp (1555), Freußdorff (1558), Feurstorf (1658), Feustorf (1704), Feustorff (1720), Feurstorp (1729), Feußdorf (1775) and finally Feusdorf (1822).

In 1373 Feusdorf had its first documentary mention as Feußdorf. This comes from a seal, now in the Koblenz State Archive, used by Clais (Nikolaus) von Feußdorf, who was the Burgmann at Junckeroide (Jünkerath).

In 1477 Wilhelm von Mirbach was enfeoffed with an estate at Feusdorf by the Duke of Jülich and Berk. In 1491, Count Johann von Manderscheid enfeoffed Nikolaus Gyse von Mertloch with several castle houses at Gerolstein and with half a house at Feusdorf. In 1543, in connection with the clergyman Johann Schnyder's introduction into Esch, the Servatiuskapelle (“Saint Servatius’s Chapel”) in Feusdorf was mentioned for the first time. In 1604, Philipp Roist von Weers was enfeoffed with holdings at Feusdorf by Count Arnold von Manderscheid.

In 1631 Threin (Katharina) Heunen, a woman from Feusdorf, was burnt alive in Esch as a witch.

In 1809 some men from the Mayoralty of Lissendorf opposed Napoleon's call to serve in his army. One of these men, named Linck, was from Feusdorf. After his house was searched, turning up four rifles, he was arrested, and shortly thereafter, along with four others, he was sentenced to death by shooting. The sentence was carried out on 23 January 1810 in Prüm.

In 1843 Feusdorf and Hütte Jünkerath together had 21 houses and 175 inhabitants. In 1848, three houses and the chapel all burnt down, but were built again on the same sites. In 1866, many villagers came down with typhus, and the sickness claimed seven lives. For its part, the district council (Kreistag) granted the municipality 25 Thaler for those who suffered typhus.

In 1876 the first school building was opened on Escher Straße, coming complete with a teacher's dwelling. In 1880, there were 40 houses in Feusdorf.

Two years later, in 1882, came a year of catastrophe. The harvest was so scant that without the state's and the province's help, a famine emergency would have had to be declared. In 1888, 54 children were attending school, 26 boys and 28 girls, although 10 of these children came from Jünkerath. Within a year, though, a new school also opened there, and these ten thereafter went there for their schooling.

In 1893 half-day schooling was introduced so that children could help with farmwork. The craftsmen's association was founded. This body's goal was to actively support members who were left without a livelihood by illness or accidents. Support was to begin with the onset of an illness and was set at two marks weekly.

In 1889 a heavy storm on 18 and 19 January damaged many roofs in Feusdorf, even leaving one house's roof on a neighbour's dungheap.

In late February 1900 diphtheria broke out among the schoolchildren. Two of them, Gotthard May, 7, and Margareta Leyendecker, 9, quickly succumbed to this illness. The school was closed forthwith and lessons did not begin again for a fortnight. Another disaster befell the local steelworks that same year. On 10 May, a pan full of molten steel tipped over, spilling its contents over 25 moulders who were on the job that evening. Six of them died of their injuries, although none of these was from Feusdorf.

On 10 February 1923 Feusdorf was connected to the electricity network. It was the first village in the Daun district (now called the Vulkaneifel district) to have electrical service. In 1925, a census yielded a population figure of 346 for Feusdorf.

On 27 February 1930 the Prussian Ministry of State in Berlin released a law allowing for the creation of the municipality of Jünkerath, whereby Feusdorf was obliged to yield a certain amount of its municipal area to this new entity. Not only did it lose land area, but also about 70 of its inhabitants, who suddenly found their homes within the new municipality of Jünkerath. Feusdorf's population had now fallen to 260.

In 1935, during excavation work for a new hunting lodge at the edge of the woods towards Esch, an urn grave with ashes and bone remnants was unearthed, showing that human habitation in Feusdorf must go back quite a long way.

In November 1939 a great fuel storage facility was established above the village in the Esch municipal forest. This was, of course, related to the German war effort. In 1940 Feusdorf was granted permission to develop a water supply system. However, owing to the ongoing war, this would have to wait. Indeed, on 1 September 1944, owing to the critical wartime situation, the school was temporarily closed. On 29 December that same year, there came an air raid, which damaged many buildings, there were no fatalities.

In late September 1945 after the fighting had ended, school began again after an interruption of more than a year when the French occupying authorities granted leave for lessons to resume. The old schoolbooks were reused, but only after all material pertaining to the Third Reich and Nazi ideology had been torn out. There were 55 pupils, 27 boys and 28 girls.

On 26 February 1946 the 32-man French occupying force was withdrawn from the village. At this time, the municipal boundary between Feusdorf and Alendorf also happened to be the boundary between the French and British zones of occupation. The checkpoint between these was set up at Hauptstraße 6.

After some measure of democracy was restored, Anton Brang became Feusdorf's first postwar mayor after an election held on 15 September 1946.

On Repentance and Prayer Day in November 1958, the new Warriors’ Memorial was dedicated in a ceremony for the victims of both World Wars. Of the 7,500 DM that it cost to build the memorial, 5,000 DM was covered by donations from Feusdorf citizens.

At the end of the 1968-1969 school year, the one-room school was dissolved. Also, the old chapel was torn down, leaving only the quire standing. This was incorporated into the new church, which was consecrated on 12 April 1970. In 1969, the municipality of Feusdorf won in the contest Unser Dorf soll schöner werden (“Our village should become lovelier”).

In 1985 the municipality laid out the building development area Am Seewinkel, filling the building gap between the village and another development area, Auf Rütt. Work on this new area began that same year and was completed in 1989. A new village square was also built in 1985.

On 28 February 1990 “Hurricane Wiebke” struck Germany, laying great swathes of the country waste. Feusdorf was not spared, and several hundred cubic metres of wood were “mown around”.

== Politics ==
=== Municipal council ===
The council is made up of 12 council members, who were elected by majority vote at the municipal election held on 7 June 2009, and the honorary mayor as chairman.

=== Coat of arms ===
The German blazon reads: In Gold ein schwarzes Hirschgeweih mit silbernem Grind, belegt mit rotem, fünflatzigen Turnierkragen.

The municipality's arms might in English heraldic language be described thus: Or a stag's attires sable fixed to the scalp argent, surmounting the attires in fesse enhanced, a label of five points gules.

Until the French Revolution (1794), Feusdorf belonged to the Lordship of Jünkerath in the County of Blankenheim. The label – the strip with the tags pointing down – recalls this time, as it was a charge in the arms borne by the Counts and shown surmounting a lion rampant (see Esch's coat of arms). Also adopted into Feusdorf's arms were the Blankenheim tinctures, sable, Or and gules (black, gold and red). Clais von Feußdorf's seal, mentioned above, bore a design of a stag's antlers (“attires”), and this now forms the main charge in the municipality's arms.

== Culture and sightseeing ==
Buildings:

- Saint Mary Magdalene’s Catholic Church (branch church), Kirchstraße 1, exposed in the quire remnants of the old Late Gothic or post-Gothic nave.
- Escher Straße – wayside cross, sandstone shaft cross, late 18th century, at the graveyard.
- Escher Straße 16 – former school, plaster building, partly slated, about 1910.
