= Üxheim =

- Municipality
- Coat of arms

- Location of Üxheim within Vulkaneifel district
- Interactive map of Üxheim
- Location within Germany Location within Rhineland-Palatinate
- Coordinates: 50°20′31″N 6°45′31″E
- Country: Germany
- State: Rhineland-Palatinate
- District: Vulkaneifel
- Municipal assoc.: Gerolstein
- Subdivisions: 7

Government
  - Mayor (2019–24): Alois Reinarz

Area
  - Total: 30.98 km^{2} (11.96 sq mi)
- Elevation: 428 m (1,404 ft)

Population (2025-12-31)
  - Total: 1,345
  - Density: 43.42/km^{2} (112.4/sq mi)
- Time zone: UTC+01:00 (CET)
  - Summer (DST): UTC+02:00 (CEST)
- Postal codes: 54579
- Dialling codes: 02696
- Vehicle registration: DAU
- Website: www.uexheim.de

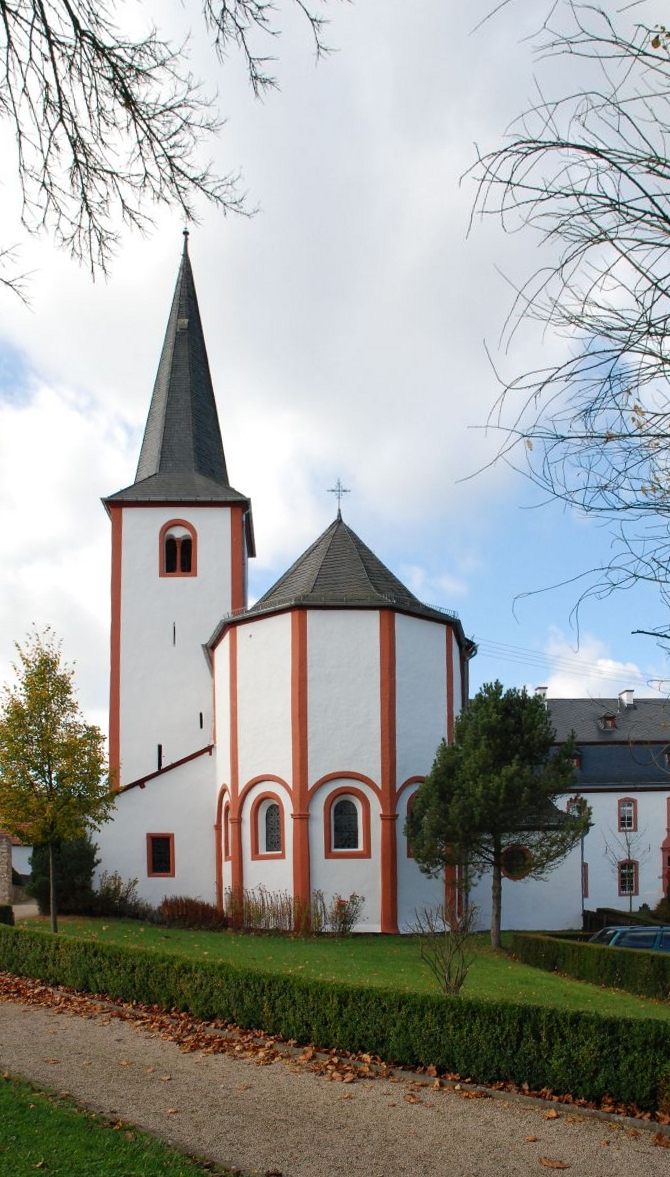
Convent church in Niederehe

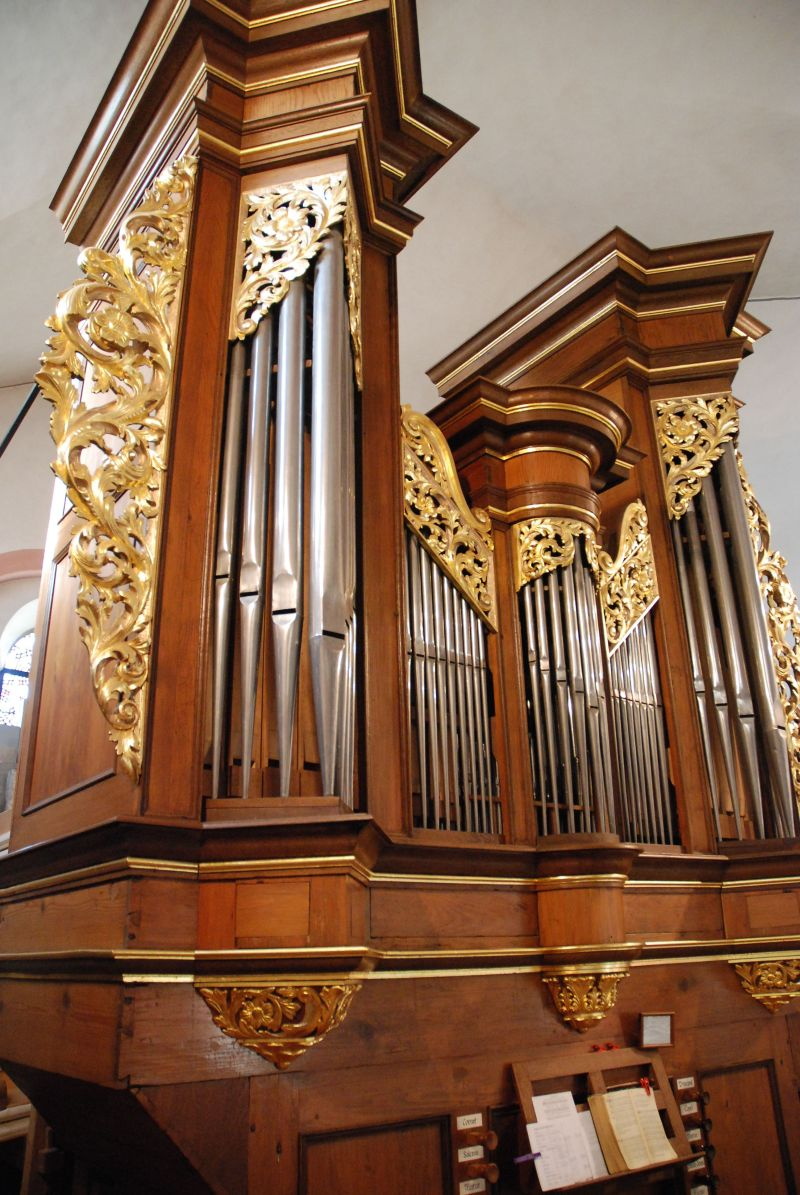
König organ in the convent church in Niederehe

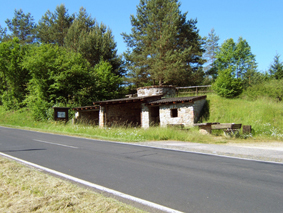
Limekiln near Niederehe

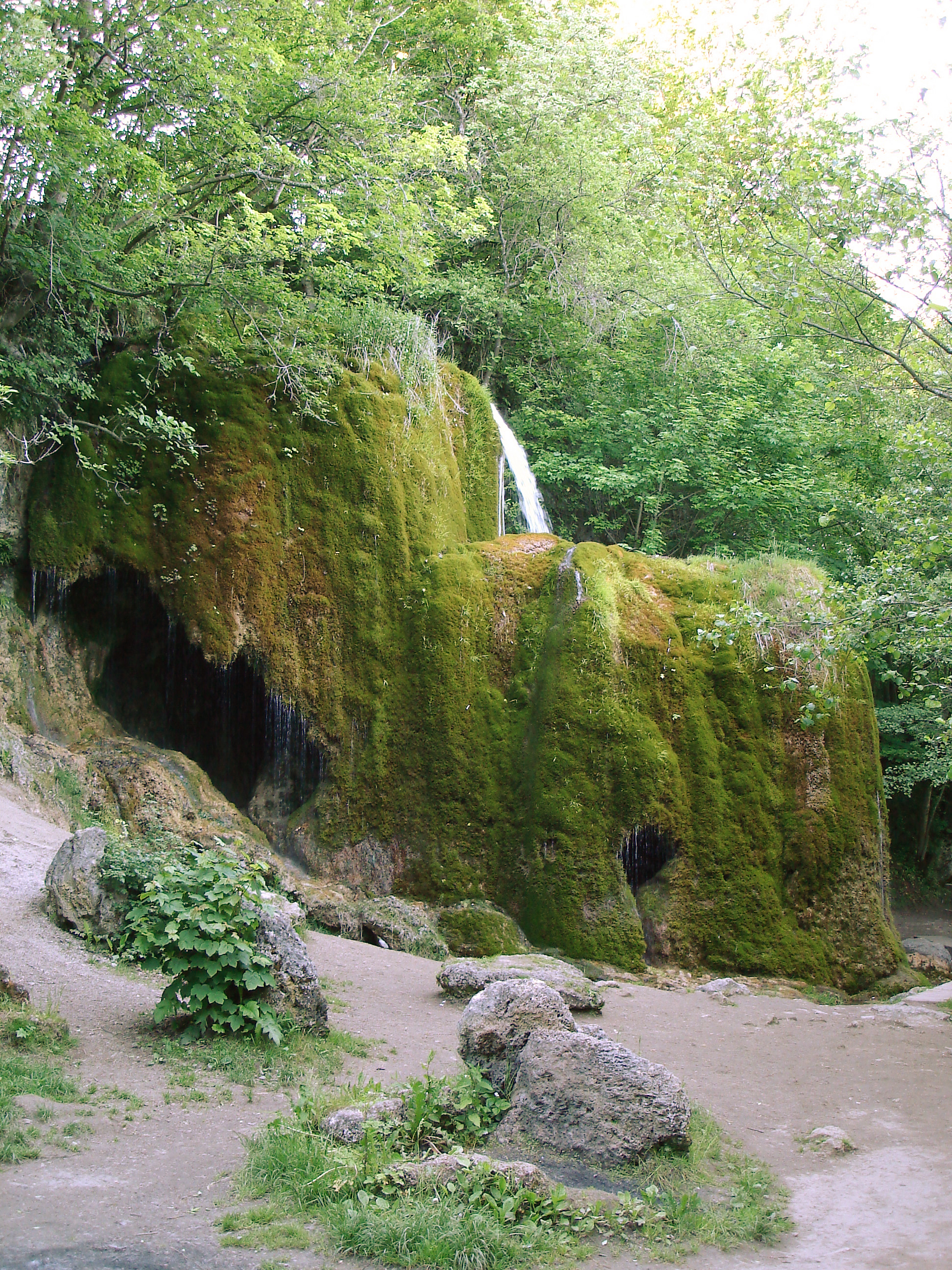
Dreimühlen waterfall

Üxheim is an Ortsgemeinde – a municipality belonging to a Verbandsgemeinde, a kind of collective municipality – in the Vulkaneifel district in Rhineland-Palatinate, Germany. It belongs to the Verbandsgemeinde of Gerolstein, whose seat is in the like-named town. The outlying centre of Niederehe is a state-recognized recreational resort (Erholungsort).

== Geography ==
=== Location ===
The municipality lies in the Vulkaneifel, a part of the Eifel known for its volcanic history, geographical and geological features, and even ongoing activity today, including gases that sometimes well up from the earth. Üxheim lies in the Hillesheimer Kalkmulde (“limestone hollow”) in the Vulkanische Westeifel, one of the three subregions into which the Vulkaneifel is divided, right on the boundary with North Rhine-Westphalia.

=== Constituent communities ===
Üxheim's Ortsteile are Üxheim, Ahütte, Leudersdorf (with Flesten and Nollenbach), Niederehe and Heyroth. The centres of Üxheim, Ahütte and Leudersdorf with Flesten form the parish of Üxheim. These centres are known collectively in the local speech as Kijeschbel, a dialectal form of the word Kirchspiel, one of several German words for “parish”. The parish of Niederehe is made up of the centres of Kerpen with Loogh, Heyroth and Niederehe. The historically interesting convent church in Niederehe houses one of the oldest organs made by Balthasar König.

=== Climate ===
This region's climate corresponds with the oceanic low-mountain climate.

Average yearly temperatures
Üxheim-Ahütte	7.4 °C
Leudersdorf	7.1 °C
Niederehe	6.9 °C
Heyroth	6.5 °C

Average yearly precipitation
Üxheim-Ahütte	810 mm
Leudersdorf	825 mm
Niederehe	770 mm
Heyroth	820 mm

== History ==
In 844, Üxheim had its first documentary mention.

The municipality was newly formed on 1 January 1968 from the formerly self-administering municipalities of Leudersdorf, Niederehe and Üxheim-Ahütte. The municipality of Heyroth was amalgamated on 1 February of the same year. All these centres belonged until the end of feudal times to the Lordship of Kerpen, in the Imperially immediate ownership of the Dukes of Arenberg.

== Politics ==
=== Municipal council ===
The council is made up of 16 council members, who were elected by proportional representation at the municipal election held on 7 June 2009, and the honorary mayor as chairman.

The municipal election held on 7 June 2009 yielded the following results:

Year	Reinarz	Spohr	Rätz	FWG	Total
2009	6	5	2	3	16 seats

=== Mayor ===
Üxheim's mayor is Alois Reinarz.

=== Coat of arms ===
The German blazon reads: Unter silbernem Schildhaupt mit rotem Zickzackbalken, von Rot über Silber schräglinks geteilt, oben 4 (3:1) goldene Mispelblüten mit blauem Butzen, unten ein schwarzer Rost.

The municipality's arms might in English heraldic language be described thus: Per bend sinister gules four cinquefoils Or pierced azure, three and one, and argent a gridiron bendwise sinister sable, on a chief of the fourth a fess dancetty of three of the first.

The municipality of Üxheim is made up of the former municipalities of Heyroth, Leudersdorf, Niederehe and Üxheim-Ahütte, all of which belonged in the Middle Ages to the Lordship of Kerpen, which was held by the Dukes of Arenberg. They bore cinquefoils (this device is so-called in English heraldry, but the German blazon describes them as Mispelblüten, German for common medlar blossoms) in the same tinctures as seen on the dexter (armsbearer's right, viewer's left) side below the chief in these arms. The cinquefoils here number four to stand for the municipality's four constituent communities. The Lords of Kerpen bore arms that were “argent a fess dancetty gules” (that is, a silver shield with a horizontal zigzag red stripe), and this is recalled in the chief (the band across the top of the escutcheon). The gridiron on the sinister (armsbearer's left, viewer's right) side is Saint Lawrence's attribute.

== Culture and sightseeing ==
=== Buildings ===
- Former parish church's quire at Brunnenstraße 14 – Late Gothic, 16th century.
- Catholic Parish Church of the Assumption of Mary (Pfarrkirche Mariä Himmelfahrt), Kirchstraße 4 – Classicist aisleless church, 1835–1837.
- Brunnenstraße 2 – estate complex; house from 1858, stable-barn.
- Brunnenstraße 14 – former school, Classicist plastered building, possibly from about 1840, built as a sideroom off the former parish church's Late Gothic quire.
- Brunnenstraße/corner of Heerstraße – wayside cross, sandstone beam cross from 1743.
- Dreimühlen fortified house, southeast of the village on the Ahbach – wall remnants from the Arenberg forest house, torn down about 1825.

==== Ahütte ====
- Saint Joseph’s Catholic Church (branch church; Filialkirche St. Joseph), Ahbachstraße 18 – biaxial Baroque aisleless church, 1705.
- Mühlenweg 4 (monumental zone) – former Arenberg mill, three-building complex together with millrace; plastered building from 1820, oven porch, quarrystone side building, partly timber-frame.
- Castle Neublankenheim, north of the village in the Ahbach valley (monumental zone) – ruins, quarrystone building, early 14th century, four-floor defensive tower.

==== Flesten ====
- Saint Roch’s Catholic Church (branch church; Filialkirche St. Rochus), St.-Rochus-Weg – biaxial aisleless church, possibly from latter half of 19th century.

==== Heyroth ====
- Saint Anthony's Catholic Church (branch church; Filialkirche St. Antonius), Vulkanweg 9 – triaxial aisleless church, from 1745.
- Antoniusstraße 3 – timber-frame house, partly solid, from 1659; quarrystone commercial buildings; whole complex.

==== Leudersdorf ====
- Saint Catherine's Catholic Church (branch church; Filialkirche St. Katharina), Kapellenstraße 4 – triaxial aisleless church, from 1734; Baroque Heiligenhäuschen (a small, shrinelike structure consecrated to a saint or saints).
- Kölner Straße 3 – timber-frame house, partly solid, from 1869, timber framing from 17th/18th century.
- Lindenstraße 15/17 – stately plastered building from 1787.
- Near Lindenstraße 16 – Baroque Bildstock, 18th century.
- Rosenweg 1 – plastered building, 1849.
- Wayside chapel, southeast of the village on the road to Üxheim – Gothic Revival from 1861; sandstone cross of memorial to the dead from 1743; Baroque Bildstock, 18th century.

==== Niederehe ====
- Saint Leodegar's Catholic Church (branch church; Filialkirche St. Leodegar), Kerpener Straße – former convent church, Late Romanesque aisleless church, last fourth of 12th century; sandstone Baroque shaft cross from 1759; remnants of old grave crosses in the old quarrystone churchyard wall.
- Auel 1 – former school, hipped roof, from 1912 to 1913.
- Gartenstraße 2 – plastered building, oven porch, apparently from 1868.
- Im Klosterhof 1-5 (monumental zone) – former Premonstratensian convent, endowed in 1175, Romanesque convent church, Baroque convent buildings, former west wing (Im Klosterhof 1 and 2): building with mansard roof from 1776; former north wing: divided into houses (Im Klosterhof 3, 4 and 5), ringed by a quarrystone wall.
- Loogher Straße/corner of Im Auel – sandstone Baroque Crucifixion Bildstock from 1721.
- Stroheicher Straße 1 – former Quereinhaus (a combination residential and commercial house divided for these two purposes down the middle, perpendicularly to the street) from 1875, expanded into a corner estate in 1903.
- Wayside cross, west of the village on the road to Kerpen – slate pedestal cross from 1841.
- Wayside cross, east of the village on the road to Heyroth, across the road from the entrance to the Eichenhof – basalt beam cross, possibly from about 1700.
- Wayside cross, north of the village on the road to Üxheim – sandstone Baroque shaft cross from 1786.

=== Limekiln ===
A restored limekiln can be found on the road from Stroheich to Nohn, about halfway between Niederehe and Nohn.

=== Natural monuments ===
==== Dreimühlen waterfall ====
In the Ahbach valley, 1 km from Ahütte and 2.8 km from Niederehe, is the Dreimühlen (“Three Mills”) waterfall. Evaporation and consequent mineral deposition in the moss is forming calc-sinter, leading the waterfall to grow by six to eight centimetres each year. The waterfall can be reached over hiking trails, the Mineralquellen-Route and the Kalkeifel-Radweg (cycle path).
