= Reuth, Rhineland-Palatinate =

Reuth
- Municipality
- Coat of arms

- Location of Reuth within Vulkaneifel district
- Interactive map of Reuth
- Location within Germany Location within Rhineland-Palatinate
- Coordinates: 50°17′44.44″N 6°29′10.61″E
- Country: Germany
- State: Rhineland-Palatinate
- District: Vulkaneifel
- Municipal assoc.: Gerolstein

Government
  - Mayor (2019–24): Ewald Hansen

Area
  - Total: 7.15 km^{2} (2.76 sq mi)
- Elevation: 560 m (1,840 ft)

Population (2025-12-31)
  - Total: 177
  - Density: 24.8/km^{2} (64.1/sq mi)
- Time zone: UTC+01:00 (CET)
  - Summer (DST): UTC+02:00 (CEST)
- Postal codes: 54597
- Dialling codes: 06552
- Vehicle registration: DAU

Reuth (German pronunciation: [ˈʁɔʏt]) is an Ortsgemeinde – a municipality belonging to a Verbandsgemeinde (a kind of collective municipality) – in the Vulkaneifel district in Rhineland-Palatinate, Germany. It belongs to the Verbandsgemeinde of Gerolstein, whose seat is in the municipality of Gerolstein.

== Geography ==
The municipality lies in the Vulkaneifel, a part of the Eifel known for its volcanic history, geographical and geological features, and even ongoing activity today, including gases that sometimes well up from the earth.

== History ==
In 1335, the Counts of Blankenheim transferred the town of Kyle (which included Reuth) to King John of Bohemia, whereupon they were promptly enfeoffed with it. Less than a century later, however, Reuth found itself in the hands of the Counts of Loen, in 1423. In 1469, all the Blankenheims’ holdings fell under the administration of the Counts of Manderscheid. These they held for more than three centuries, until in 1780, the Count of Sternberg took over all the Manderscheids’ holdings. He did not enjoy them for very long, for in 1794, the French took over this part of Germany in the wake of the French Revolution, incorporating Reuth and the rest of the region into the French Republic. It is believed that the outlying centre of Neureuth was founded in 1814. Two years later, Reuth found itself under Prussian administration. In 1859, the village's first school was built.

In 1870 and 1871 – the time of the Franco-Prussian War – 17 families from Reuth emigrated to the United States.

In 1891, the first watermain – made of stones – was built into the village centre. In 1893 and 1894, this facility was updated and leaden pipes were laid. In these same two years, 15 children died in a diphtheria outbreak.

The waterworks were further improved in 1911 with the advent of household connections. In 1924 came electric light. Once again in 1932, sickness claimed lives when 15 people died in an influenza outbreak. An unfinished new school building was destroyed during the Second World War. However, Reuth got its new school eventually. It was dedicated in 1954. Then, in 1971, it was shut down.

Sewerage finally came to Reuth in 1956, along with a sewage treatment plant. In 1958, the local bypass, the E 42, was built, and in 1963, Flurbereinigung was finished.

In 1968, a youth centre was newly built. It was expanded in 1987. A children's playground was built in 1990.

Between 1988 and 1990, the sewerage and sewage treatment plant were rebuilt. Between 1996 and 2002, all municipal streets and the village square were expanded.

In 2000, the wind farm was built with nine generators. In 2003, a new playground was opened in the village centre. In this same year and the next, youth group facilities and an event pavilion were expanded.

== Politics ==
=== Municipal council ===
The council is made up of 6 council members, who were elected by majority vote at the municipal election held on 7 June 2009, and the honorary mayor as chairman.

=== Mayor ===
Reuth's mayor is Ewald Hansen.

=== Coat of arms ===
The German blazon reads: Von Gold und Rot gespalten, über einem von Blau und Silber gespaltenen Wellenbalken vorn eine rechtsgewendete rote Axt, hinten über drei goldenen Kugeln (1:2) eine goldene Mitra, darin ein rotes Kreuz.

The municipality's arms might in English heraldic language be described thus: Per pale Or a fess wavy abased azure above which an axe palewise gules, and gules a fess wavy abased conjoined as one to the other argent above which a mitre Or charged with a Latin cross of the field above three bezants, one and two.

The field tinctures Or and gules (gold and red) refer to the village's mediaeval allegiance to the lordship of Manderscheid-Blankenheim, for they are the Counts’ old tinctures. The fess wavy (that is, horizontal wavy stripe), which changes tincture at the line of partition, symbolizes the local brook, the Reuther Bach. The village's name, Reuth – in common with other local names that end with —rath, —roth and the like – can be traced back to woodland clearing – called Rodung in German – that most likely happened in the 9th or 10th century. This part of Reuth's history, and indeed its name's derivation, are represented by the axe. The mitre and the three bezants (golden disks, or in this case balls or orbs, as the German blazon has it) are Saint Nicholas’s attributes, thus representing the municipality's and the chapel's patron saint.

== Culture and sightseeing ==
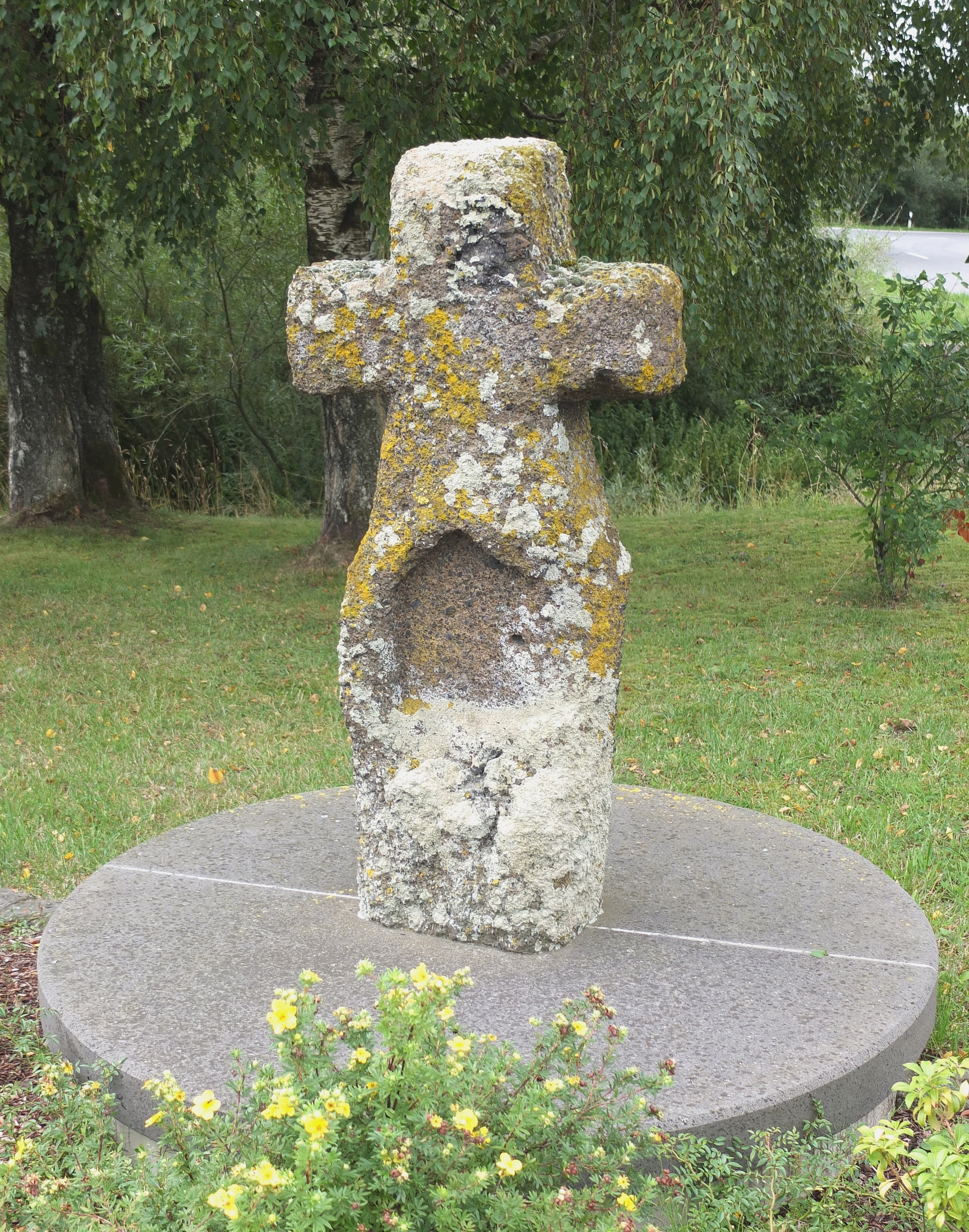
Wayside cross

Buildings:

- Chapel from 1858.
- Wayside cross, southwest of the village on the road to Neuendorf – basalt niche cross from before the 18th century.

== Economy and infrastructure ==
The Windpark Reuth, a wind farm, has nine wind turbines.
