= Dohm-Lammersdorf =

- Municipality
- Location of Dohm-Lammersdorf within Vulkaneifel district
- Interactive map of Dohm-Lammersdorf
- Location within Germany Location within Rhineland-Palatinate
- Coordinates: 50°15′52″N 6°39′59″E
- Country: Germany
- State: Rhineland-Palatinate
- District: Vulkaneifel
- Municipal assoc.: Gerolstein

Government
  - Mayor (2019–24): Wolfgang Schüssler

Area
  - Total: 4.54 km^{2} (1.75 sq mi)
- Elevation: 390 m (1,280 ft)

Population (2025-12-31)
  - Total: 211
  - Density: 46.5/km^{2} (120/sq mi)
- Time zone: UTC+01:00 (CET)
  - Summer (DST): UTC+02:00 (CEST)
- Postal codes: 54576
- Dialling codes: 06593
- Vehicle registration: DAU

Dohm-Lammersdorf is an Ortsgemeinde – a municipality belonging to a Verbandsgemeinde, a kind of collective municipality – in the Vulkaneifel district in Rhineland-Palatinate, Germany. It belongs to the Verbandsgemeinde of Gerolstein, whose seat is in the like-named town.

== Geography ==
=== Location ===
The municipality lies in the Kyll valley in the Vulkaneifel, a part of the Eifel known for its volcanic history, geographical and geological features, and even ongoing activity today, including gases that sometimes well up from the earth.

Dohm has an elevation of 398 m above sea level and lies at the foot of the now extinct stratovolcano Giesenheld (476 m).

=== Geology ===
Geologically, Dohm-Lammersdorf is at the end of the bunter-rich, so-called Bettinger Graben, which stretches southwards from Lissendorf in the north. Locally, its most striking feature is the relatively flat and broad Kyll valley, which at the edges rises in terracelike formations to elevations of more than 500 m.

=== Constituent communities ===
Dohm-Lammersdorf’s two Ortsteile are, as its hyphenated name implies, Dohm and Lammersdorf. The former is slightly bigger with roughly 100 inhabitants, whereas about 80 people call Lammersdorf home.

== History ==
In 1301, Dohm had its first documentary mention when the knight Fridericus von Daun (or Dohm) was enfeoffed by the Archbishopric of Trier with Castle Manderscheid, where he was to perform services. In the earlier half of the 13th century, one of his forebears, Heinrich von Daun, who had been a marshal in Count of Luxembourg, Duke Walram von Limburg’s service, had acquired the Luxembourgish lordship over Densborn, which included Dohm and Lammersdorf, right up until the time of French rule, as a Luxembourgish lower lordship.

Of the castle itself, little remains but a 4 m-high and 20 m-long quarrystone wall, although written reports from the time say that there were still castle ruins in 1758.

It is believed that in 1528, Prüm Abbey drew tithes from Dohm and Lammersdorf through its holding of Densborn.

The Lords of Densborn (and then beginning in 1654, the Electoral-Trier chancellor Johann von Anethan and his heirs) held the high, middle and low jurisdiction here as well as the hunting and fishing rights.

The Trier Cathedral Capitulary, Baron Johann Sigismund Otto von Quadt called himself “a lord of Dohm and Lammersdorf” in an inscription under a coat of arms in a Mürlenbach church window in 1720. It is unknown how he was related to the lordly family.

The lordly landholdings in Dohm and Lammersdorf were divided in 1758 among four leaseholders, who in return were obliged each year “to deliver 2 Malter 1 Sester of rye, 4 Malter 6 Sester of oats, 4 Malter 6 Sester of spelt and 3 pounds of flax as rent”. Furthermore, they were also “bound to various statute labours and performances”.

The Luxembourgish lordship over Densborn also meant that the Catholic faith was maintained in Dohm and Lammersdorf in the late 14th and early 15th centuries, whereas the rest of the Parish of Gerolstein turned from the Church.

== Politics ==
=== Municipal council ===
The council is made up of 6 council members, who were elected by majority vote at the municipal election held on 7 June 2009, and the honorary mayor as chairman.

== Culture and sightseeing ==
=== Buildings ===
- Saint Remigius’s Catholic Church (branch church), Hauptstraße 3, aisleless church, 18th century, tower partly Romanesque, upper parts 1862, sandstone shaft cross from 1846, about 15 grave crosses from the 17th to 19th centuries.
- Hauptstraße – remnants of a castle site.
- Hauptstraße/corner of Tannenweg – wayside cross in a niche, 16th century.
- Wayside cross – just north of the village on the road to Hillesheim, shaft cross from 1777.
- Wayside cross – southwest of the village on the road to Gerolstein, Baroque sandstone shaft cross, latter half of 18th or early 19th century.
- Saint Luke’s Catholic Church (branch church), Kapellenweg, quire tower from the Late Middle Ages, monaxial aisleless church, 1795, Lammersdorf.
- Parish hall

All sites listed above are in Dohm, unless otherwise noted.

=== Natural monuments ===
- Beilstein
- Griesenheld block lava field
- Ditschbachtal (valley)
