= Densborn =

- Municipality
- Coat of arms

- Location of Densborn within Vulkaneifel district
- Interactive map of Densborn
- Location within Germany Location within Rhineland-Palatinate
- Coordinates: 50°7′35″N 6°36′10″E
- Country: Germany
- State: Rhineland-Palatinate
- District: Vulkaneifel
- Municipal assoc.: Gerolstein

Government
  - Mayor (2019–24): Jürgen Clemens

Area
  - Total: 14.42 km^{2} (5.57 sq mi)
- Elevation: 320 m (1,050 ft)

Population (2025-12-31)
  - Total: 509
  - Density: 35.3/km^{2} (91.4/sq mi)
- Time zone: UTC+01:00 (CET)
  - Summer (DST): UTC+02:00 (CEST)
- Postal codes: 54570
- Dialling codes: 06594
- Vehicle registration: DAU
- Website: www.densborn-eifel.de

Densborn is an Ortsgemeinde – a municipality belonging to a Verbandsgemeinde, a kind of collective municipality – in the Vulkaneifel district in Rhineland-Palatinate, Germany. It belongs to the Verbandsgemeinde of Gerolstein, whose seat is in the like-named town.

== Geography ==
=== Location ===
The municipality lies in the Vulkaneifel, a part of the Eifel known for its volcanic history, geographical and geological features, and even ongoing activity today, including gases that sometimes well up from the earth.

=== Climate ===
Yearly precipitation in Densborn amounts to 864 mm, falling into the highest third of the precipitation chart for all Germany. At 74% of the German Weather Service's weather stations lower figures are recorded. The driest month is April. The most rainfall comes in November. In that month, precipitation is 1.5 times what it is in April. Precipitation hardly varies. At only 11% of the weather stations are lower seasonal swings recorded.

== History ==
Densborn had its first documentary mention more than 1,100 years ago in Prüm Abbey’s directory of holdings, the Prümer Urbar.

As early as the 9th century, however, a castle was mentioned that is believed to have been built by this same abbey. The last holders were the Lords of Anethan, hereditary Marshals of Luxembourg.

In 1289, the local church was raised to parish church.

== Politics ==
=== Municipal council ===
The council is made up of 12 council members, who were elected by majority vote at the municipal election held on 7 June 2009, and the honorary mayor as chairman.

=== Mayor ===
Densborn’s mayor is Jürgen Clemens.

=== Coat of arms ===
The German blazon reads: Unter rot-silbern durch Zinnenschnitt geteiltem Schildhaupt und über silbernem Schildfuß, darin ein schwarzes Richtrad, in rot ein schreitender, silbern gekrönter und silbern bewehrter Löwe.

The municipality’s arms might in English heraldic language be described thus: Gules a chief per fess embattled of five of the field and argent and a base of the second charged with a breaking wheel spoked of seven sable, between which a lion passant Or, armed, langued and crowned of the second.

The German blazon makes no mention of the lion’s tongue’s tincture, but it appears as silver (argent).

The division of the chief in these arms in the form of crenellations on a castle wall (“embattled”) recalls Densborn castle. The Lords of Anethan, the castle's last holders, bore arms charged with a lion, which has also been incorporated into the municipality's arms, albeit with the tinctures reversed (Or on gules – gold on red – instead of gules on Or, as the Lords bore them). The breaking wheel in the base refers to the municipality's former patron saint, Catherine (Mary Magdalene now holds this place).

== Culture and sightseeing ==
=== Buildings ===
- Former moated castle, Burgstraße (monument zone), parts of the outer wall from the Late Middle Ages with round tower, foundations of older dwelling buildings, current house, late 16th century, remodelled in 18th century.
- Saint Mary Magdalene’s Catholic Parish Church, Kirchstraße 1, Gothic quire and tower, sandstone shaft cross from 1633, former grave cross (?), possibly also from the 17th century.
- Bahnhofstraße 2/4 – railway station, station building and separate side building of the Eifelbahn (railway), from about 1870.
- Bitburger Straße/corner of Mürlenbacher Straße – wayside cross (shaft cross) from 1639.
- Near Hauptstraße 9 – wayside cross (Baroque shaft cross) from 1795 (?).
- Meisburger Straße 24 – Baroque plaster structure, about 1800, old quarrystone wall.
- Meisburger Straße/corner of Kirchstraße – wayside cross (shaft cross) from 1633.
- Mürlenbacher Straße 1 – Quereinhaus (a combination residential and commercial house divided for these two purposes down the middle, perpendicularly to the street), mid to late 19th century, old cobbles in yard.
- Kreuzigungsbildstock (“Crucifixion Bildstock”), east of the village near the Lindenhof, from 1645.
- Wayside cross, north of the village on the bank of the river Kyll, shaft cross from 1736.
- Wayside cross, southeast of the village on a country path, niche cross from 1609 and 1876, altered in 1935.

== Economy and infrastructure ==
=== Transport ===
The halt at Densborn lies on the Eifelbahn (Cologne-Euskirchen-Gerolstein-Trier railway line), on which there is public rail transport between Gerolstein and Trier.

Public transport is integrated into the Verkehrsverbund Region Trier (VRT), whose fares therefore apply.
