= Walsdorf, Rhineland-Palatinate =

Walsdorf
- Municipality
- Coat of arms

- Location of Walsdorf within Vulkaneifel district
- Interactive map of Walsdorf
- Location within Germany Location within Rhineland-Palatinate
- Coordinates: 50°16′47.35″N 6°42′29.54″E
- Country: Germany
- State: Rhineland-Palatinate
- District: Vulkaneifel
- Municipal assoc.: Gerolstein

Government
  - Mayor (2019–24): Horst Well

Area
  - Total: 10.83 km^{2} (4.18 sq mi)
- Elevation: 490 m (1,610 ft)

Population (2025-12-31)
  - Total: 912
  - Density: 84.2/km^{2} (218/sq mi)
- Time zone: UTC+01:00 (CET)
  - Summer (DST): UTC+02:00 (CEST)
- Postal codes: 54578
- Dialling codes: 06593
- Vehicle registration: DAU
- Website: www.walsdorf-vulkaneifel.de

Walsdorf (German pronunciation: [ˈvalsˌdɔʁf]) is an Ortsgemeinde – a municipality belonging to a Verbandsgemeinde, a kind of collective municipality – in the Vulkaneifel district in Rhineland-Palatinate, Germany. It belongs to the Verbandsgemeinde of Gerolstein, whose seat is in the like-named town.

== Geography ==
=== Location ===
The municipality lies roughly 3 km southeast of Hillesheim in the Vulkaneifel, a part of the Eifel known for its volcanic history, geographical and geological features, and even ongoing activity today, including gases that sometimes well up from the earth.

=== Constituent communities ===
The neighbouring community of Zilsdorf was amalgamated with Walsdorf on 17 March 1974.

== History ==
In 806, Villa Wallemaresdorp had its first documentary mention in a document dealing with a donation to Prüm Abbey; however, it is not universally agreed that this is a reference to Walsdorf. It is certain, though, that there were landholdings on the Arensberg (mountain) in 1023. In 1353, a Centerei Walsdorf (“tithing centre of Walsdorf”). On 17 March 1974, the formerly self-administering municipality of Zilsdorf was amalgamated with Walsdorf.

== Politics ==
=== Municipal council ===
The council is made up of 12 council members, who were elected by proportional representation at the municipal election held on 7 June 2009, and the honorary mayor as chairman.

The municipal election held on 7 June 2009 yielded the following results:

Year	Schäfer	Meyers	Müller	Slupek	Total
2009	5	4	2	1	12 seats

=== Mayor ===
Walsdorf's mayor is Horst Well; the representative from the outlying centre of Zilsdorf is Helmut Hohn.

=== Coat of arms ===
The German blazon reads: In silbernem Schild ein schräglinker, roter Balken, belegt mit 3 goldenen Mispelblüten mit blauen Butzen, oben begleitet von einem roten Ring, unten von einer roten Lilie.

The municipality's arms might in English heraldic language be described thus: Argent a bend sinister gules charged with three cinquefoils Or pierced azure, the whole between an annulet and a fleur-de-lis, both of the second.

Both Walsdorf and the formerly separate centre of Zilsdorf lay under the Imperially immediate ownership of the Dukes of Arenberg in the Middle Ages. They bore three cinquefoils (this device is so-called in English heraldry, but the German blazon describes them as Mispelblüten, German for common medlar blossoms) in the same tinctures in which they appear in Walsdorf's arms (and the field in their arms was of the same tincture as the bend sinister in Walsdorf's arms). These cinquefoils now appear as a charge in the municipal arms to recall this era in the municipality's history. The annulet is Saint Arnulf's attribute and the lily Saint Anthony's, thus representing the municipality's two patron saints, the former being Walsdorf's and the latter Zilsdorf's. In each case, the saint is both the village's and the church's patron.

== Culture and sightseeing ==
=== Buildings ===
- Saint Arnulf's Catholic Parish Church (Pfarrkirche St. Arnulf), Koblenzer Straße 16 – Classicist aisleless church, 1828.
- Bergstraße 5 – estate complex; four-axis house, possibly from the late 19th century; bakehouse/house for elderly, from 1808; commercial building, partly timber-frame, 18th century (or older?).
- Goßbergstraße 3 – estate along street with lengthy commercial section.
- Beside Kirchstraße 9 – Quereinhaus (a combination residential and commercial house divided for these two purposes down the middle, perpendicularly to the street), 1786.
- Kölner Straße (no number) – former railway station on the Ahrtalbahn (railway), Renaissance Revival building with half-hipped roof, original coloured glazing, apparently from 1910.
- Kölner Straße 24 – Quereinhaus, apparently from 1890.
- Tannenweg 5 – villa, historicized plastered building, possibly from between 1915 and 1920.
- Graveyard, southeast of the village – sandstone Baroque shaft cross from 1680.
- Wayside cross, east of the village on the road to Zilsdorf – post-Baroque shaft cross from 1812.

==== Zilsdorf ====
- Saint Anthony's Catholic Church (branch church; Filialkirche St. Antonius), Antoniusweg 2 – biaxial aisleless church, 1815.
- Auf der Steip 9 – parallel estate, building with half-hipped roof, 19th century, stately timber-frame commercial building, partly solid, 18th century.
- Auf der Steip 10 – one-floor Quereinhaus, apparently from 1887.
- Hauptstraße 9 – estate along street; house from 1817, commercial building from 1826.
- Wayside cross, west of the village on the road to Walsdorf – shaft cross from 1817.
- Wayside cross, northwest of the village beside the entrance to the wayside chapel – shaft cross, possibly from early 19th century.

=== Natural monuments ===
Worthy of note are the Walsdorfer Trockenmaar, a dried-up maar, the lava quarry in the south of Walsdorf and the volcanic crater Arensberg (also called Arnulphusberg) in the north.

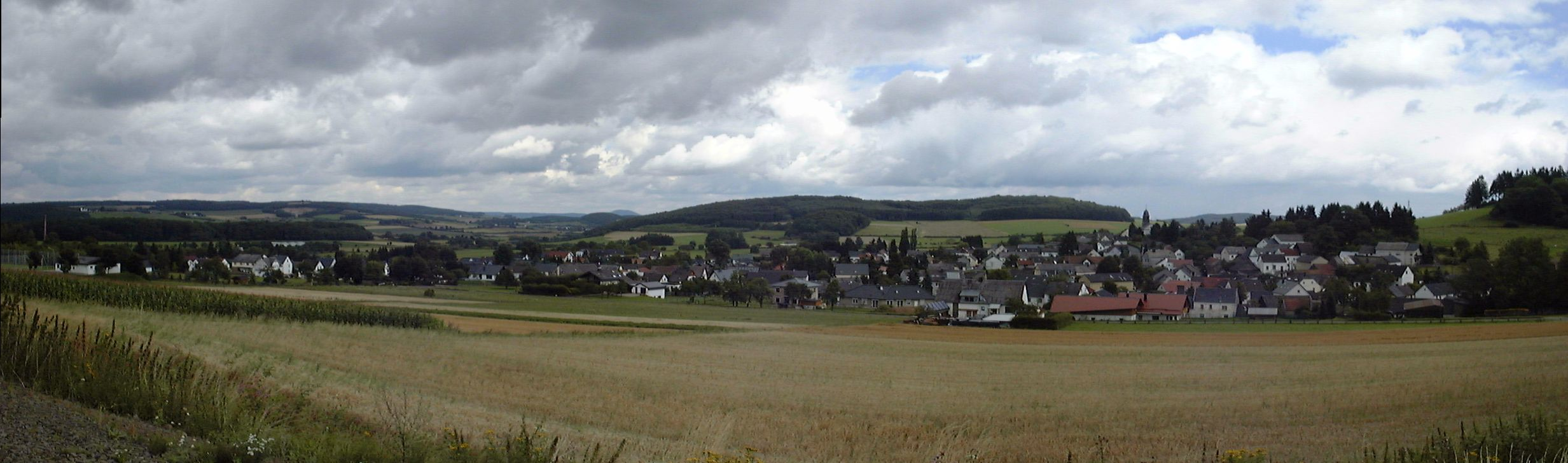
Walsdorf from the south (2006)
