= Stadtkyll =

- Municipality
- Coat of arms

- Location of Stadtkyll within Vulkaneifel district
- Interactive map of Stadtkyll
- Location within Germany Location within Rhineland-Palatinate
- Coordinates: 50°21′08″N 6°31′52″E
- Country: Germany
- State: Rhineland-Palatinate
- District: Vulkaneifel
- Municipal assoc.: Gerolstein

Government
  - Mayor (2019–24): Harald Schmitz

Area
  - Total: 20.78 km^{2} (8.02 sq mi)
- Elevation: 450 m (1,480 ft)

Population (2025-12-31)
  - Total: 1,542
  - Density: 74.21/km^{2} (192.2/sq mi)
- Time zone: UTC+01:00 (CET)
  - Summer (DST): UTC+02:00 (CEST)
- Postal codes: 54589
- Dialling codes: 06597
- Vehicle registration: DAU
- Website: www.stadtkyll.de

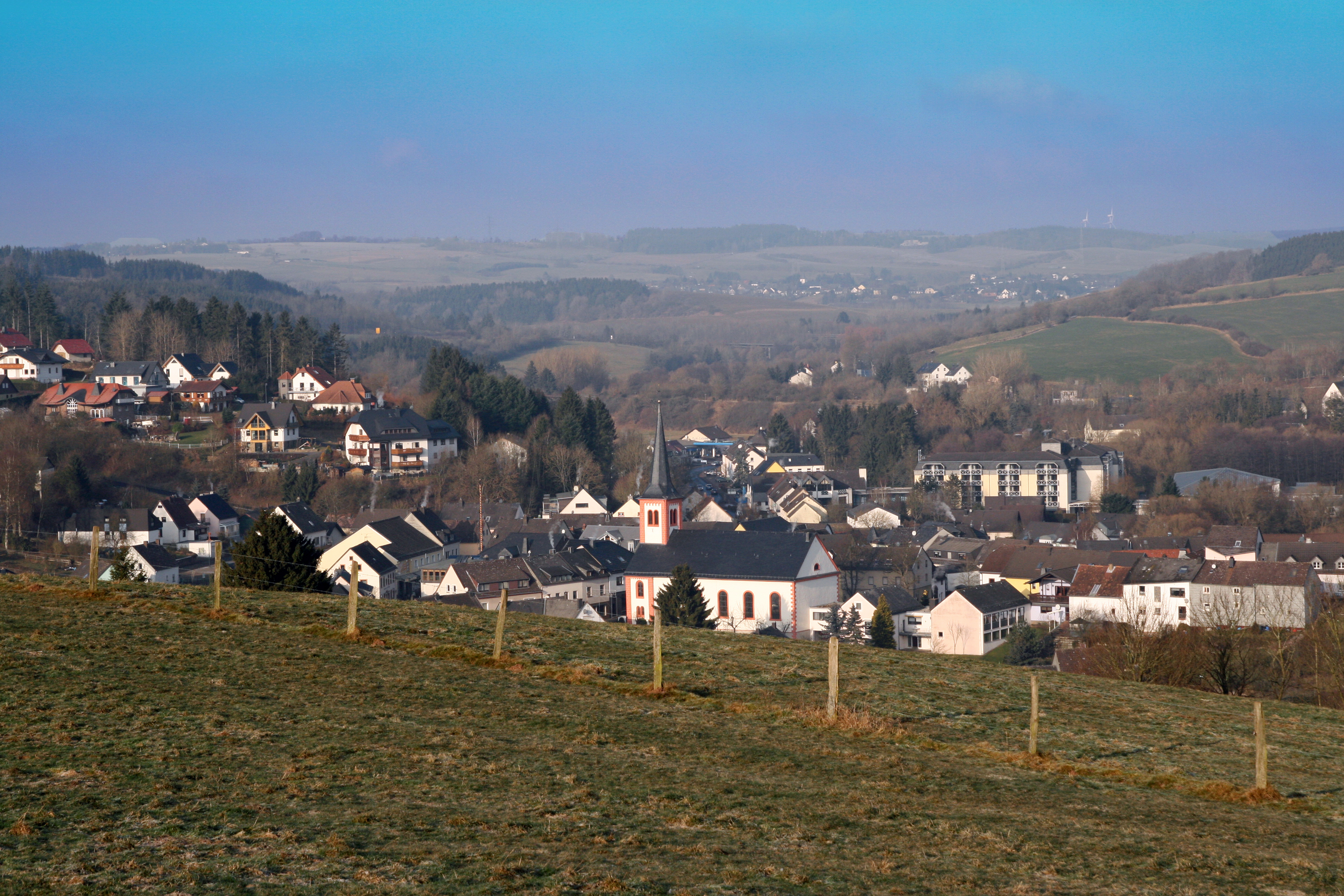
View of Stadtkyll

Stadtkyll is an Ortsgemeinde – a municipality belonging to a Verbandsgemeinde, a kind of collective municipality – in the Vulkaneifel district in Rhineland-Palatinate, Germany. It belongs to the Verbandsgemeinde of Gerolstein, whose seat is in the municipality of Gerolstein. Stadtkyll is a state-recognized climatic spa (Luftkurort).

== Geography ==
=== Location ===
The municipality lies in the Vulkaneifel, a part of the Eifel known for its volcanic history, geographical and geological features, and even ongoing activity today, including gases that sometimes well up from the earth. Stadtkyll lies on the river Kyll.

=== Constituent communities ===
Stadtkyll's Ortsteile are Niederkyll, Schönfeld and Stadtkyll.

== History ==
Near the village and in the outlying centre of Niederkyll, many finds from Roman times have been unearthed during excavation work. In the lists of the Archiepiscopal Cathedraticum, which come from about 1100, is a mention of the village under the name Kyll. In the 13th century, the village quickly grew in importance. About 1250 it was raised to town and thereby also acquired the right to bear a coat of arms; the one borne then matches the one borne today. In 1292, it had already become a town girded with a wall and with a castle. In 1308, it had its first documentary mention as Stadtkyll-Opidum in the Liber valoris. Over the course of its history, Stadtkyll has been beset by several catastrophes. In 1632, in the Thirty Years' War, an army of mercenaries set most of the village on fire. In 1687, the French destroyed the village. In 1814 and again in 1854, great fires burnt Stadtkyll down. After these fires, the old town wall served as a quarry of sorts for building material to rebuild the village. The wall completely disappeared as a result, and its alignment can now only be made out in the rows of houses on Burgbergstraße.

The heaviest destruction sustained by Stadtkyll, however, came in the air raids in December 1944 and just after New Year's, late in the Second World War, after the Battle of the Bulge. Seventy-five percent of the village was destroyed.

The outlying centre of Schönfeld was bound to pay tributes to Prüm Abbey in the 13th century. Beginning in the 14th century, it was administered from Stadtkyll. Since 1 January 1971, when Schönfeld was amalgamated, it has been an Ortsteil of Stadtkyll.

Stadtkyll's other outlying centre, Niederkyll, had its first documentary mention in 1345 when the Lords of Blankenheim enfeoffed, among others, King John of Bohemia as Count of Luxembourg, with Niederkyll. The chapel was built about 1600, and was supposedly once Stadtkyll's parish church.

Niederkyll's history apparently stretches all the way back to Roman times. A Roman road supposedly passed along this way, and it is also said that the chapel's tower stands on the foundation of what was once a Roman sacrificial site.

In 1970, the sawing works of the firm Hermes located itself in the industrial park near Niederkyll. The company makes up a prominent part of the community's appearance with its 70 000 m^{2} area.

On the Stadtkyller Heide, a local heath, between 1952 and 1992, stood a Decca transmitter.

== Politics ==
=== Municipal council ===
The council is made up of 16 council members, who were elected by proportional representation at the municipal election held on 7 June 2009, and the honorary mayor as chairman. The 16 seats on council are shared between two voters’ groups.

=== Mayor ===
Stadtkyll's mayor is Harald Schmitz. The representative from the outlying centre of Schönfeld, the Ortsvorsteher, is Carmen Hildegard Mies.

=== Coat of arms ===
The German blazon reads: Von gold und rot durch gesenkten, schräglinken, blauen Wellenbalken und silberen Wellenleistenstab geteilt, der Wellenbalken mit sieben vierendigen goldenen Sternen belegt.

The municipality's arms might in English heraldic language be described thus: A bend sinister wavy abased azure charged with seven mullets of four Or and conjoined by a bendlet sinister wavy argent, the whole between Or and gules.

The Stadtkyll Castle was most likely built by the Lords of Blankenheim. In 1469, the County of Blankenheim, and thereby also Stadtkyll, found itself in the ownership of the Counts of Manderscheid, whose armorial tinctures. Stadtkyll was granted town rights in 1310, and thereby also the right to bear arms. They were more or less the same as the ones that the municipality bears today. The bend sinister in the old arms has been made wavy, however, and a silver bendlet has been added to its lower edge, to symbolize that the village's and the castle's surroundings are shaped by their location on the river Kyll.

== Culture and sightseeing ==
=== Buildings ===
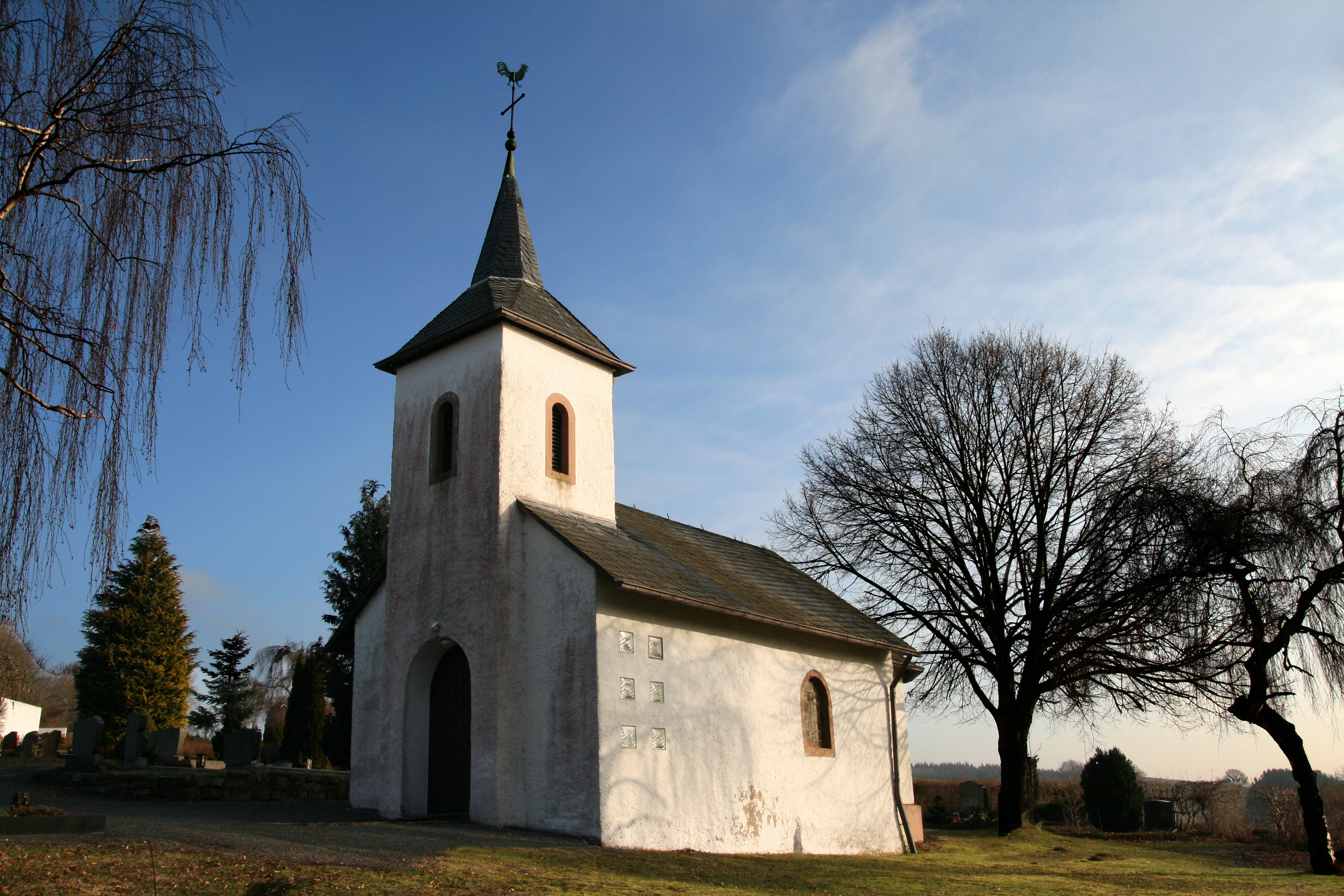
Stadtkyll graveyard chapel

- Saint Joseph’s Catholic Parish Church (Pfarrkirche St. Joseph), Hauptstraße – Classicist aisleless church, 1853/1854, originally built in 1814 to Karl Friedrich Schinkel’s plans; burnt out in 1853.
- Saint Hubert’s Catholic Church (branch church; Filialkirche St. Hubert) in Niederkyll, Niederkyll 1 – aisleless church, about 1600. See below.
- Bahnhofstraße 1 – former railway station with goods shed; plastered building with outdoor stairway, partly timber-frame; goods shed with open timber framing, ramps.
- Kyllstraße/corner of Kockelsberg – wayside cross, red sandstone shaft cross, 18th century.
- Zum Ehrenmal – warriors’ memorial 1914-1918, gatehouse, 1934, designed by Professor Fahrenkamp, Düsseldorf.
- Saint Margaret's Graveyard Chapel (Friedhofskapelle St. Margarethen), in the graveyard north of the village – multiphase plastered building with west tower; graveyard cross (?) from 1841.

==== Schönfeld ====
- Catholic branch church, Dorfstraße 30 – aisleless church from shortly before 1870.
- Dorfstraße/corner of Auf der Kau – wayside cross, basalt beam cross, possibly 17th century.
- Hauptstraße 53 – stable-barn built crosswise onto a Quereinhaus at In der Nosheck 4.
- In der Nosheck 4 – Quereinhaus (a combination residential and commercial house divided for these two purposes down the middle, perpendicularly to the street), mid 18th century, expanded later by stable-barn built crosswise onto it at Hauptstraße 53 into a corner estate.
- Killergasse 8 – homestead, 19th century.
- Neuer Weg – wayside cross, niche cross from 1691.

==== Saint Hubert’s Catholic Church ====
Saint Hubert’s Catholic Church, or Chapel (Kapelle St. Hubertus), in Niederkyll was built about 1600. Outside, on the gable, a Roman bust of a man is set in the wall. Many legends and stories swirl around the Late Gothic Saint Hubert’s. It is said once to have been Stadtkyll’s parish church. Furthermore, stories have it that it is built on Roman foundations that formerly bore a sacrificial site that the Romans used to appease their war god, Mars. Offered as proof of this are finds of Roman coins nearby and, particularly, the find of a stone head – now set in the wall on the chapel’s east gable – formerly falsely claimed to be a likeness of Mars or Jupiter. Thus far, the origin of this Roman bust is unknown, as is the man whose likeness it is. Scientific interpretation has raised the possibility that it might be part of a grave, given that it is near the old Roman camp of Icorigium (now Jünkerath). It is even possible that the chapel’s builders interpreted it as a saint’s likeness, and accordingly set it in the chapel’s wall.

== Economy and infrastructure ==
Stadtkyll is a state-recognized climatic spa (Luftkurort) and records in its many lodging facilities roughly 70,000 holiday guests with some 300,000 overnight stays each year. In the village centre are restaurants and small shops. One of the main attractions is a heated open-air community swimming pool with a giant chute and a rope swing. There is also an outstanding spot for anglers. The local municipality operates a forest camp for youth. A large holiday village and a camping site are partially publicly accessible.
