= Nohn =

- Municipality
- Coat of arms

- Location of Nohn within Vulkaneifel district
- Interactive map of Nohn
- Location within Germany Location within Rhineland-Palatinate
- Coordinates: 50°19′49″N 6°47′12″E
- Country: Germany
- State: Rhineland-Palatinate
- District: Vulkaneifel
- Municipal assoc.: Gerolstein

Government
  - Mayor (2019–24): Bernhard Jüngling

Area
  - Total: 11.07 km^{2} (4.27 sq mi)
- Elevation: 430 m (1,410 ft)

Population (2025-12-31)
  - Total: 439
  - Density: 39.7/km^{2} (103/sq mi)
- Time zone: UTC+01:00 (CET)
  - Summer (DST): UTC+02:00 (CEST)
- Postal codes: 54578
- Dialling codes: 02696
- Vehicle registration: DAU

Nohn is an Ortsgemeinde – a municipality belonging to a Verbandsgemeinde, a kind of collective municipality – in the Vulkaneifel district in Rhineland-Palatinate, Germany. It belongs to the Verbandsgemeinde of Gerolstein, whose seat is in the like-named town.

== Geography ==
The municipality lies both in the Vulkaneifel, a part of the Eifel known for its volcanic history, geographical and geological features and even ongoing activity today, and in the Kalkeifel, another part of the Eifel characterized by limestone (Kalkstein in German). The municipality lies right on the boundary with North Rhine-Westphalia and at the common point of three districts, Ahrweiler, Euskirchen and Vulkaneifel (until 31 December 2006 called Daun).

The nearest major centres within a 20 km radius of Nohn are Adenau, Blankenheim, Daun, Gerolstein, Hillesheim, Kelberg and Jünkerath.

== History ==
The name “Nohn” is held to derive from the Latin phrase ad nonum lapidem, meaning “at the ninth stone”, that is to say, at the ninth milestone on the old Roman road between Trier and Cologne. This, however, cannot be taken as serious historical information, for in Roman times, Nohn had not yet arisen. Nohn had its first documentary mention about 970 as the location of a chapel.

In feudal times, Nohn belonged to the Electoral-Trier Amt of Daun. The knightly seat at Nohn was held for several centuries by the Lords of Hillesheim. The municipality's and the church's patron saint is Saint Martin. This gives a clue as to a long church tradition in the village. As early as 970, a chapel in Nohn was named.

Until 30 September 1932, the municipality belonged to the Adenau district. This district, however, was abolished in the course of administrative reform. From 1 October 1932 to 6 November 1970, Nohn was part of the Ahrweiler district, and since 7 November 1970 it has belonged to the Daun district, whose name was changed on 1 January 2007 to Vulkaneifel.

== Politics ==
=== Municipal council ===
The council is made up of 8 council members, who were elected by majority vote at the municipal election held on 7 June 2009, and the honorary mayor as chairman.

=== Mayor ===
Nohn's mayor is Bernhard Jüngling.

=== Coat of arms ===
The municipality's arms might be described thus: Per fess, Or a demi-eagle bicapitate displayed sable armed and langued gules, and azure a sword bendwise point to chief argent, hilted of the first.

The two-headed eagle in the upper part of the escutcheon refers to a relationship between the municipality and St. Maximin's Abbey in Trier. The Kapelle Noyn (“Nohn Chapel”) supposedly once belonged to the Abbey, according to a falsified, but presumably factually correct, document from 970. There is a further clue to a relationship between the two in a reference from 1759 that names the Abbey as the body with tithing rights to the village. The lower half of the arms is charged with a sword, Saint Martin's attribute, thus representing the municipality's and the church's patron saint.

== Culture and sightseeing ==
=== The Nohner ===
The Nohner is a motorcycle built as part of a limited series in the early 1920s by the Brothers Hoffmann in Nohn. The one on display on the premises of the firm Hoffmann-Reisen is the only one of these vehicles still in existence. It is driven by a British Villiers engine.

In 2005 and 2006, the Nohner was driven in the fourth and fifth Bad Münstereifel Ernst Neumann-Neander Memorial Roadtrip.

=== Buildings ===
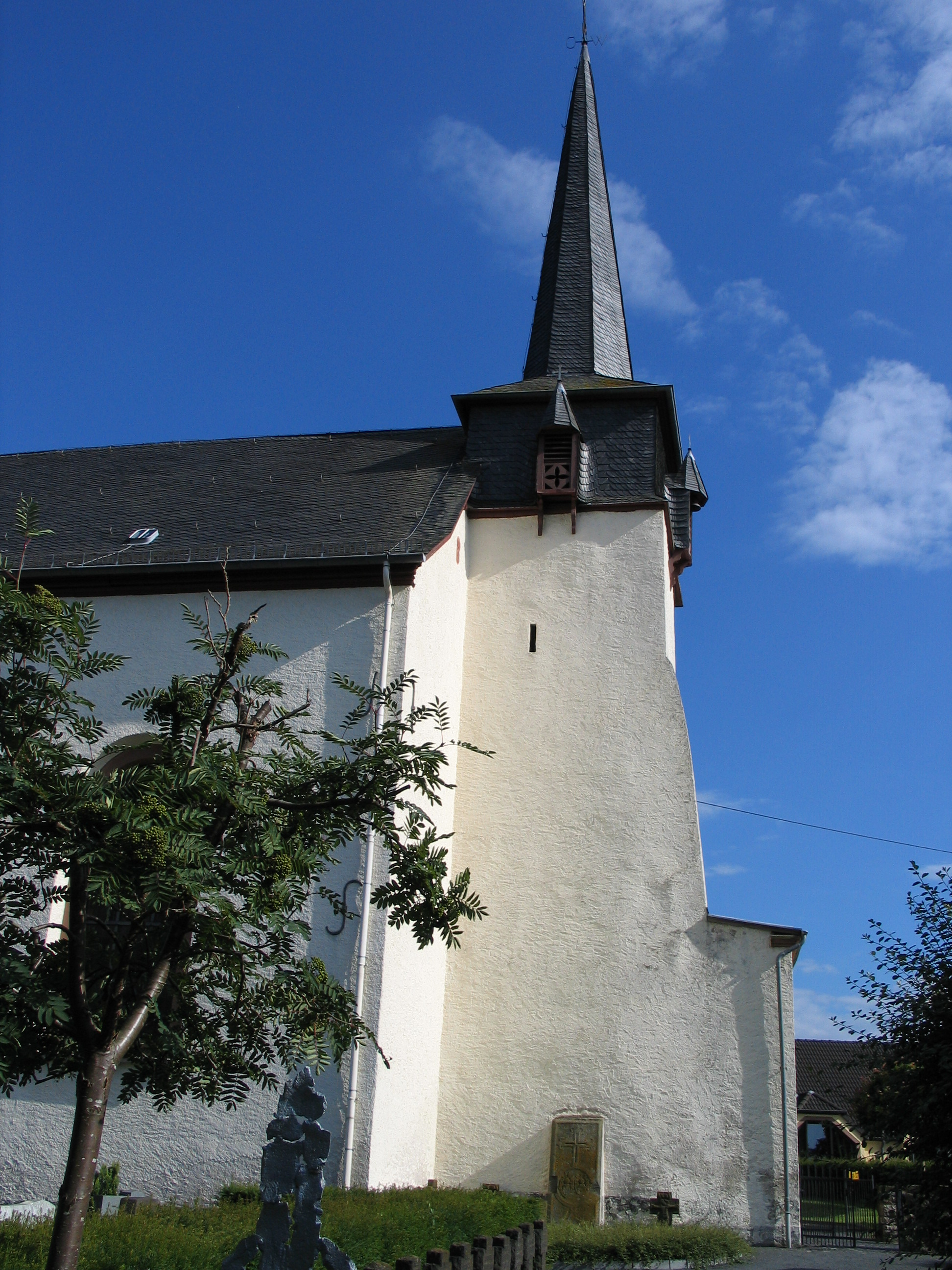
Saint Martin's Parish Church

The Nohn parish church was built by Brother Nick from Solothurn as an aisleless church in 1781. The tower has its beginnings in the 16th century. The church is consecrated to Saint Martin of Tours. The Romanesque Revival building has a high altar from the earlier half of the 17th century that, although altered a number of times, is still in very much its original condition. The confessionals and the pulpit come from the 18th century. The Baroque organ was installed in 1868; it had been built in 1720 and used elsewhere. Before coming to Nohn, it had been at Saint Mathias's Abbey.

In the abutting graveyard stands a Crucifixion Bildstock from 1741. The church's entrance door, flanked by lions, bears a warriors’ memorial to the dead of the First World War.

Other listed buildings and structures in the municipality include the following:

- Bergstraße 10 – building with roof with half-hipped gables from 1802.
- Hauptstraße 33 – one-floor timber-frame house, partly solid, with knee wall, possibly 18th century.
- Hauptstraße 38 – estate along street from 1807 (or perhaps 1804 – the last digit is unclear).
- Kirchstraße/corner of Zur Ley – wayside chapel, plastered building from 1861.
- Kirchstraße/corner of Hauptstraße – sandstone Baroque Crucifixion Bildstock.
- Ob der Insel 2 – timber-frame estate complex.
- Zur Ley 2 – house or residential part of an estate complex from 1816 (?), red sandstone gateway.
- Zur Ley 3 – one-and-a-half-floor timber-frame house, partly solid, sided, 18th/19th century.
- Nohner Mühle, southwest of the village on the Ahbach – former gristmill; house, 1778, barn, partly timber-frame from 1804.
- Wayside chapel near the Nohner Mühle, plastered building apparently from 1804.

=== Tourism ===
The municipality lies at the northeastern edge of the Hillesheim holiday region in the Vulkaneifel European Geopark, but is also surrounded by the Blankenheim an der Ahrquelle, Hocheifel-Nürburgring and Kelberg holiday regions. Given its favourable central location, Nohn is an ideal starting point for outings in all these holiday regions or to other points of interest in the Eifel.

Through the municipality runs the “Geo-Path” of the Verbandsgemeinde of Hillesheim, a local hiking loop as well as one of the Eifel Club's hiking trails. Through the nearby Ahbach valley run the well known Eifel-Krimi-Wanderweg (“Eifel Crime Fiction Hiking Trail”), the Eifelsteig and the two cycle paths Kalkeifel-Radweg and Mineralquellen-Route, the latter's name referring to mineral springs.

=== Nearby points of interest ===
Worth seeing are a natural monument lying in the Üxheim-Ahütte municipal area, the Dreimühlen Waterfall, which draws its name from the nearby ruin of Dreimühlen, a basalt deposit on the Nohner Bach, the limekiln in the Üxheim-Niederehe municipal area (on the road from Nohn to Stroheich), the limestone crags in the Ahbach valley and the ruin of Neublankenheim near Üxheim-Ahütte.

Cycle paths in the area are the Ahrtal-Radweg, the Kalkeifel-Radweg and the mountain bike path for cross-country riders that leads around the Nürburgring.

== Economy and infrastructure ==
=== Transport ===
It is only a few kilometres over Landesstraße (State Road) 10 or 167 to Bundesstraße 258 (Aachen-Koblenz), over Landesstraße 68 to Bundesstraße 421 (Belgian border-Hunsrück) or Landesstraße 70 to Bundesstraße 410 (Luxembourgish border-Mayen).

After A 1 is completed between the Blankenheim and Gerolstein interchanges, the municipality will be reachable through the Adenau interchange.

=== Businesses ===
In the village centre is a small supermarket with a butcher’s shop. Not far from the village square is a small beverage dealer's shop. Also, there are two auto workshops/dealerships as well as an electrician’s business. On the village's outskirts (towards Adenau) are a woodworking business, a street improvement business and a bus company with a filling station.

Several times each week, Nohn is visited by vending trucks selling baked goods and foods.
