= Gerolstein (Verbandsgemeinde) =

Verbandsgemeinde in Germany

- Verbandsgemeinde
- Coat of arms

- Location of Gerolstein within Vulkaneifel district
- Interactive map of Gerolstein
- Location within Germany Location within Rhineland-Palatinate
- Coordinates: 50°13′N 6°39′E
- Country: Germany
- State: Rhineland-Palatinate
- District: Vulkaneifel
- Seat: Gerolstein
- Subdivisions: 38 municipalities

Area
  - Total: 455.29 km^{2} (175.79 sq mi)

Population (2025-12-31)
  - Total: 30,367
  - Density: 66.698/km^{2} (172.75/sq mi)
- Time zone: UTC+01:00 (CET)
  - Summer (DST): UTC+02:00 (CEST)
- Website: www.gerolstein.de

Gerolstein is a Verbandsgemeinde ("collective municipality") in the district Vulkaneifel, in Rhineland-Palatinate, Germany. The seat of the Verbandsgemeinde is in Gerolstein. On 1 January 2019 it was expanded with the municipalities of the former Verbandsgemeinden Hillesheim and Obere Kyll.

The Verbandsgemeinde Gerolstein consists of the following Ortsgemeinden ("local municipalities"):

1. Basberg
2. Berlingen
3. Berndorf
4. Birgel
5. Birresborn
6. Densborn
7. Dohm-Lammersdorf
8. Duppach
9. Esch
10. Feusdorf
11. Gerolstein
12. Gönnersdorf
13. Hallschlag
14. Hillesheim
15. Hohenfels-Essingen
16. Jünkerath
17. Kalenborn-Scheuern
18. Kerpen
19. Kerschenbach
20. Kopp
21. Lissendorf
22. Mürlenbach
23. Neroth
24. Nohn
25. Oberbettingen
26. Oberehe-Stroheich
27. Ormont
28. Pelm
29. Reuth
30. Rockeskyll
31. Salm
32. Scheid
33. Schüller
34. Stadtkyll
35. Steffeln
36. Üxheim
37. Walsdorf
38. Wiesbaum
