= Berndorf, Rhineland-Palatinate =

Berndorf
- Municipality
- Coat of arms

- Location of Berndorf within Vulkaneifel district
- Interactive map of Berndorf
- Location within Germany Location within Rhineland-Palatinate
- Coordinates: 50°18′20″N 6°42′02″E
- Country: Germany
- State: Rhineland-Palatinate
- District: Vulkaneifel
- Municipal assoc.: Gerolstein

Area
  - Total: 9.14 km^{2} (3.53 sq mi)
- Elevation: 485 m (1,591 ft)

Population (2025-12-31)
  - Total: 513
  - Density: 56.1/km^{2} (145/sq mi)
- Time zone: UTC+01:00 (CET)
  - Summer (DST): UTC+02:00 (CEST)
- Postal codes: 54578
- Dialling codes: 06593
- Vehicle registration: DAU
- Website: www.berndorf-vulkaneifel.de

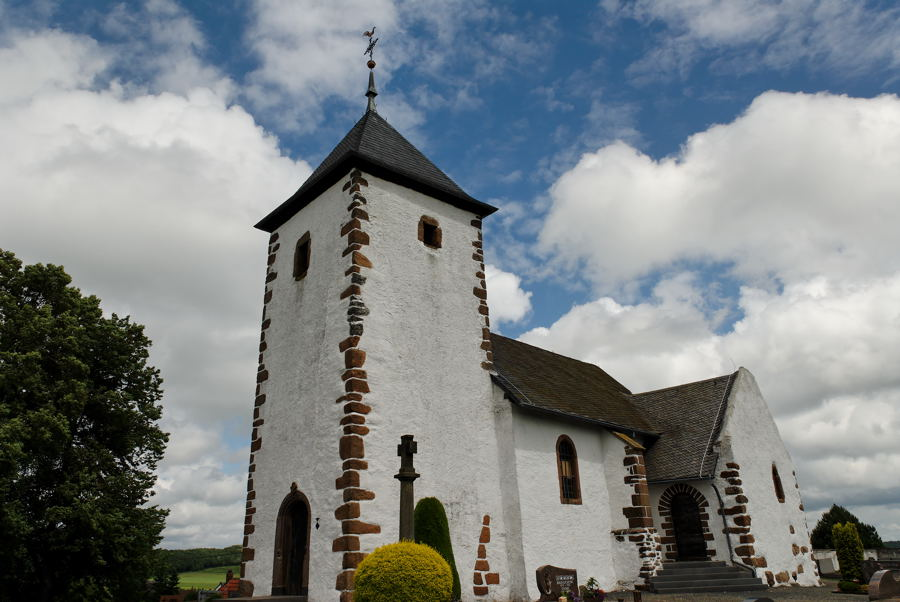
Fortress church

Berndorf is an Ortsgemeinde – a municipality belonging to a Verbandsgemeinde, a kind of collective municipality – in the Vulkaneifel district in Rhineland-Palatinate, Germany. It belongs to the Verbandsgemeinde of Gerolstein, whose seat is in the like-named town.

== Geography ==
=== Location ===
Berndorf lies between Hillesheim and Kerpen, southwest of the latter in the Vulkaneifel, a part of the Eifel known for its volcanic history, geographical and geological features, and even ongoing activity today, including gases that sometimes well up from the earth.

== History ==
In 1121, Berndorf had its first documentary mention.

Beginning in the 14th century, Berndorf – then still known as “Berendorf” – belonged to the Electorate of Trier, and more locally to the Amt of Hillesheim. According to a “patronage under oath” undertaken by two Amtmänner (Amt officials) in 1379, the Margraves of Jülich also exercised their rights in “Berendorf”.

In connection with the Napoleonic Wars, the region came to be under French administration in 1794, and from 1798 onwards belonged to the canton of Daun in the Department of Sarre.

After the Rhineland passed to the Kingdom of Prussia in 1815 under the terms of the treaties concluded at the Congress of Vienna, Berndorf belonged to the Bürgermeisterei (“Mayoralty”) of Kerpen in the district of Daun, itself newly created in 1816.

In the course of administrative restructuring in Rhineland-Palatinate, the municipality passed in 1970 to the Verbandsgemeinde of Hillesheim.

== Politics ==
=== Municipal council ===
The council is made up of 12 council members, who were elected by majority vote at the municipal election held on 7 June 2009, and the honorary mayor as chairman.

=== Coat of arms ===
The German blazon reads: In silbern vor rot gespaltenem Schilde vorn ein rotes Balkenkreuz, hinten ein goldener Schlüssel mit abgewendetem Bart.

The municipality's arms might in English heraldic language be described thus: Per pale, argent a cross gules and gules a key palewise, the wards to chief and sinister, Or.

The cross on the dexter (armsbearer's right, viewer's left) side stands for the old Electorate of Trier, while the key on the sinister (armsbearer's left, viewer's right) side stands for the parish's patron saint, Peter.

The arms have been borne since 7 August 1961, when they were approved by the Rhineland-Palatinate Ministry of the Interior.

== Culture and sightseeing ==
=== Buildings ===
The village's character centres on the Romanesque fortress church at Kiefernstraße 4, which today serves as a graveyard chapel. It is a small, aisleless structure from between 1513 and 1515 with a walled churchyard. The west tower is from 1545. It has 14 Stations of the Cross, and also a warriors’ memorial from the First World War. Saint Peter's Parish Church (Pfarrkirche St. Peter; indeed, both churches are consecrated to Saint Peter), built right next to it at Kirchstraße 1, comes from 1927 and is an aisleless church with Expressionistic influences.

Other cultural heritage buildings include:

- Beulerstraße 10 – a small stable-house (with former on the ground floor) with an “oven porch” from 1875;
- Beulerstraße 16 – a house, apparently from 1892;
- Hillesheimer Straße 20 – Quereinhaus (a combination residential and commercial house divided for these two purposes down the middle, perpendicularly to the street) from 1866 with an “oven porch”;
- Kirchstraße 4 – former school or rectory (?), five-axis solid construction, middle or latter half of the 19th century;
- Pastor-Fuhrmann-Straße 17 – stately Quereinhaus, roof with half-hipped gable, latter half of the 19th century;
- Niche cross – the so-called Ablaßkreuz (“Indulgence Cross”), sandstone, possibly from the 16th century.

== Famous people ==
Anton Schütz (born 19 April 1894 in Berndorf, died 6 October 1977), well-known artist in New York

== Sundry ==
The village gave the writer Michael Preute the surname for his pseudonym, Jacques Berndorf.
