= Esch, Vulkaneifel =

Esch
- Municipality
- Coat of arms

- Location of Esch within Vulkaneifel district
- Interactive map of Esch
- Location within Germany Location within Rhineland-Palatinate
- Coordinates: 50°21′56″N 6°36′41″E
- Country: Germany
- State: Rhineland-Palatinate
- District: Vulkaneifel
- Municipal assoc.: Gerolstein

Government
  - Mayor (2019–24): Edi Schell

Area
  - Total: 10.17 km^{2} (3.93 sq mi)
- Elevation: 540 m (1,770 ft)

Population (2025-12-31)
  - Total: 413
  - Density: 40.6/km^{2} (105/sq mi)
- Time zone: UTC+01:00 (CET)
  - Summer (DST): UTC+02:00 (CEST)
- Postal codes: 54585
- Dialling codes: 06597
- Vehicle registration: DAU

Esch (German pronunciation: [ɛʃ]) is an Ortsgemeinde – a municipality belonging to a Verbandsgemeinde, a kind of collective municipality – in the Vulkaneifel district in Rhineland-Palatinate, Germany. It belongs to the Verbandsgemeinde of Gerolstein, whose seat is in the municipality of Gerolstein.

== Geography ==
The municipality lies in the Vulkaneifel, a part of the Eifel known for its volcanic history, geographical and geological features, and even ongoing activity today, including gases that sometimes well up from the earth.

== History ==
Esch lies on the Roman road that led from Trier to Cologne (Via Agrippa). In the 12th century, it had its first documentary mention. In the 16th century, there was a court in Esch that exercised high jurisdiction over several places in the nearby country. Esch became notorious for its witch trials in the 17th century. The village sustained very heavy damage in the Second World War. South of Esch lies a war graveyard witnessing the heavy fighting in March 1945.

== Politics ==
=== Municipal council ===
The council is made up of 12 council members, who were elected by majority vote at the municipal election held on 7 June 2009, and the honorary mayor as chairman.

=== Coat of arms ===
The German blazon reads: In Rot das goldene Brustbild des hl. Petrus mit silbernem Heiligenschein. In der rechten Hand ein silbernes Buch, in der Linken einen silbernen Schlüssel mit abgewendetem Bart haltend. Über einem goldenen Schilde, darin ein rotbewehrter schwarzer Löwe, belegt mit fünflätzigem, roten Turnierkragen.

The municipality’s arms might in English heraldic language be described thus: Gules, in base an inescutcheon Or charged with a lion rampant sable armed and langued gules and surmounted at the shoulder by a label of five points of the same, standing behind the inescutcheon Saint Peter in his glory, vested Or and turned to dexter, in his dexter hand a book argent and in his sinister hand a key palewise of the same, the wards to chief and dexter.

Esch’s coat of arms is modelled after an old seal from 1620 used by the Schöffen (roughly “lay jurists”). The black lion on the inescutcheon refers to the former lordship of the Counts of Manderscheid-Blankenheim. Esch’s patron saint is Saint Peter, shown here with his attributes, the key and the book. He is also depicted with a halo (“in his glory”).

== Culture and sightseeing ==
- Oktoberfest in spring
- Mime and Clown centre

=== Buildings ===
- Saint Medardus’s Catholic Parish Church, Kirchstraße, west tower 12th or 13th century, Late Gothic nave, quire and transept from 1911, whole complex with churchyard, partly with older graves, and rectory (Hauptstraße 62).
- Hauptstraße 33 – former school, representative mansard roof building, stair tower, Reform architecture, from 1913.
- Hauptstraße 34 – house.
- Hauptstraße 62 – rectory, stately building with half-hipped gables, from 1775.
- Hauptstraße/corner of Jünkerather Straße – wayside cross, sandstone shaft cross, date unknown
- Hauptstraße/corner of Kapellenstraße – wayside chapel, plaster building, apparently from 1870, shaft cross from 1720.
- Im Ecken 2 – one-floor Quereinhaus (a combination residential and commercial house divided for these two purposes down the middle, perpendicularly to the street), possibly from the late 18th century, old cobbles in yard.
- (At) Jünkerather Straße 2 – sandstone skirting of a house entrance, possibly from the mid 18th century.
- Wayside cross north of the village on a hill by the road to Jünkerath, sandstone shaft cross, possibly from the 18th century.
