= Basberg =

- Municipality
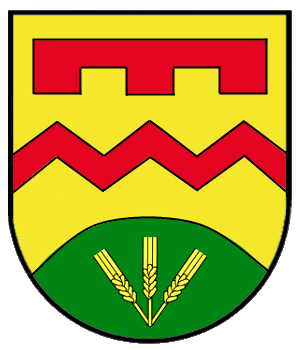
- Coat of arms

- Location of Basberg within Vulkaneifel district
- Interactive map of Basberg
- Location within Germany Location within Rhineland-Palatinate
- Coordinates: 50°17′43″N 6°36′33″E
- Country: Germany
- State: Rhineland-Palatinate
- District: Vulkaneifel
- Municipal assoc.: Gerolstein

Government
  - Mayor (2019–24): Franz-Josef Diederichs

Area
  - Total: 2.32 km^{2} (0.90 sq mi)
- Elevation: 449 m (1,473 ft)

Population (2025-12-31)
  - Total: 77
  - Density: 33/km^{2} (86/sq mi)
- Time zone: UTC+01:00 (CET)
  - Summer (DST): UTC+02:00 (CEST)
- Postal codes: 54578
- Dialling codes: 06593
- Vehicle registration: DAU
- Website: www.basberg.de

Basberg is an Ortsgemeinde – a municipality belonging to a Verbandsgemeinde, a kind of collective municipality – in the Vulkaneifel district in Rhineland-Palatinate, Germany. It belongs to the Verbandsgemeinde of Gerolstein, whose seat is in the like-named town.

== Geography ==
The municipality lies at the foot of the Katzenberg (conservation area) south of Lissendorf in the Vulkaneifel, a part of the Eifel known for its volcanic history, geographical and geological features, and even ongoing activity today, including gases that sometimes well up from the earth.

== History ==
In 1491, Basberg had its first documentary mention. Towards the end of the Middle Ages, Basberg belonged to the comital family of Manderscheid-Blankenheim. In 1491, the then landholder Count Johann von Manderscheid-Blankenheim enfeoffed Wilhelm von Daun with estates and landholdings in Basberg. Among its other holdings, Prüm Abbey also held an estate in this village in the Eifel. When Basberg came under Prussian administration in the 19th century, it belonged to the Bürgermeisterei (“Mayoralty”) of Lissendorf.

On 7 November 1970, part of the municipality of Basberg with 55 inhabitants was transferred to Steffeln.

== Politics ==
=== Municipal council ===
The council is made up of 6 council members, who were elected by majority vote at the municipal election held on 7 June 2009, and the honorary mayor as chairman.

== Culture and sightseeing ==
=== Buildings ===
- Saint Eligius’s Catholic Church – a branch church at Lissendorfer Straße 3, a small Classicist aisleless church from 1846.
- Am Katzenberg 7 – 19th century.
- Aueler Straße 5/7 – house once belonging to an estate complex; might be from mid 18th century; expanded in early 20th century.
- Oberbettinger Straße 4 – stately estate complex with several buildings grouped around a yard.
- Wayside cross – north of the village on a country footpath, made of sandstone, from 1693.

=== Clubs ===
- Tischtennisverein Basberg e.V. (table tennis)
- Karnevalsverein Siesta Bande e.V. (carnival society or Fastnacht)
- Basberg volunteer fire brigade
- 1. Junggesellenverein Basberg (youth service club)

=== Regular events ===
- Schutzhüttenfest (“Mountain Hut Festival”) on the first weekend in June
- Kirmes in October
- Every other year a stage of the Rally Oberehe is held in Basberg.
