= Steffeln =

- Municipality
- Coat of arms

- Location of Steffeln within Vulkaneifel district
- Interactive map of Steffeln
- Location within Germany Location within Rhineland-Palatinate
- Coordinates: 50°17′16.75″N 6°34′2.11″E
- Country: Germany
- State: Rhineland-Palatinate
- District: Vulkaneifel
- Municipal assoc.: Gerolstein

Government
  - Mayor (2019–24): Sonja Blameuser

Area
  - Total: 20.92 km^{2} (8.08 sq mi)
- Elevation: 490 m (1,610 ft)

Population (2025-12-31)
  - Total: 637
  - Density: 30.4/km^{2} (78.9/sq mi)
- Time zone: UTC+01:00 (CET)
  - Summer (DST): UTC+02:00 (CEST)
- Postal codes: 54597
- Dialling codes: 06593
- Vehicle registration: DAU
- Website: www.steffeln.de

Steffeln is an Ortsgemeinde – a municipality belonging to a Verbandsgemeinde, a kind of collective municipality – in the Vulkaneifel district in Rhineland-Palatinate, Germany. It belongs to the Verbandsgemeinde of Gerolstein, whose seat is in the municipality of Gerolstein.

== Geography ==
=== Location ===
The municipality lies in the Vulkaneifel, a part of the Eifel known for its volcanic history, geographical and geological features, and even ongoing activity today, including gases that sometimes well up from the earth.

=== Constituent communities ===
Steffeln's Ortsteile are, besides the main centre, also called Steffeln, Auel and Lehnerath.

=== Climate ===
Yearly precipitation in Steffeln amounts to 946 mm, which is very high, falling into the highest fourth of the precipitation chart for all Germany. At 81% of the German Weather Service's weather stations, lower figures are recorded. The driest month is April. The most rainfall comes in December. In that month, precipitation is 1.6 times what it is in April. Precipitation varies moderately. At 65% of the weather stations, lower seasonal swings are recorded.

== History ==
Traces of Roman settlement (a villa rustica) can be found in the rural cadastral area “Ringmauer” not far from the village beside today's “Römerhof” (“Roman Estate”). The tuff quarry below the church was already in use in ancient times. In 943, Steffeln had its first documentary mention as villa stephelin. In 1222, steffele was listed in Prüm Abbey’s directory of holdings, the Prümer Urbar: The Count of Hochstaden held Steffeln as a fief. From the Hochstadens, Steffeln passed to the Lords of Jünkerath, and from them by marriage to the Schleidens. In 1282, Konrad von Schleiden sold Steffeln to Gerhard von Blankenheim. In 1489, 1501 and 1562, the Counts of Nassau and Vianden were the feudal lords. From the 16th century until 1794, the lesser lordship of Steffeln belonged to the lordship of Kronenburg under Luxembourgish Imperial territorial superiority. Between 1488 and 1593, the Counts of Manderscheid-Schleiden were enfeoffed with Steffeln. Through sale it found its way into Manderscheid-Gerolstein hands in 1617. After this line died out, Steffeln was held from 1693 to 1719 by the Manderscheid-Blankenheim line.

The castle, mentioned in 1282, on the tuff crags overlooking the village was converted in the 15th or 16th century into a compulsory-labour and toll estate for the Manderscheid toll station on the long-distance trade road running from Liège by way of Malmedy to Koblenz, and into a seat for the comital Schultheißen. Part of the residential house is preserved (the back part of today’s rectory). There was trade in “oven stones” from the Küllenberg (mountain) and millstones from the Steffelberg. After a years-long lawsuit against the landlord, Count Karl of Manderscheid, a compromise was reached in 1638 before the High Court in Luxembourg, which secured what is today the extensive municipal forest for the dwellers of Steffeln.

After the occupation of the lands on the Rhine’s left bank by French Revolutionary troops in 1794 and the French annexation of the Austrian Netherlands between 1795 and 1797, Steffeln became the seat of a mairie (“mayoralty”) in the Canton of Kronenburg, the Arrondissement of Malmedy and the Department of Ourthe, whose seat was in Liège. In the course of the sweeping political changes in Europe in the wake of the Congress of Vienna in 1815, Steffeln passed as the seat of a Bürgermeisterei (“mayoralty”) to the Prüm district in Prussia’s new Rhine Province. In the course of administrative restructuring in Rhineland-Palatinate on 7 November 1970, Steffeln was grouped into the Daun district, which has since been given the name Vulkaneifel. Amalgamated with Steffeln that same year were Auel and Lehnerath.

Auel had its first documentary mention in 983. It and Lehnerath were held in the Middle Ages by the Counts of Manderscheid-Gerolstein.

=== Population development ===
In 1632, twenty families lived in Steffeln. In 1687, however, there were already 87 houses. In the 19th century, the population figure rose steeply, reaching 229 in 1818 and 415 in 1871. Since the beginning of the 20th century, only slight changes in the figure have been observed, although the number of households has shrunk: in 1939, 445 inhabitants, in 1970, 424 inhabitants, in 1987, 447 inhabitants, in 2001, 493 inhabitants (with Lehnerath). Since the 1970s, it has become a commuter community with a pronounced rural character.

== Politics ==
=== Municipal council ===
The council is made up of 12 council members, who were elected by majority vote at the municipal election held on 7 June 2009, and the honorary mayor as chairman.

=== Mayor ===
Steffeln’s mayor is Sonja Blameuser.

=== Coat of arms ===
The German blazon reads: In Silber eine blaue, von je einem sechsstrahligen blauen Stern flankierte Spitze; in der Spitze ein aufrechtes, silbernes Flammenschwert mit goldenem Griff.

The municipality’s arms might in English heraldic language be described thus: Argent two mullets azure in chief flanking a pile transposed of the same charged with a sword raguly of the field hilted Or.

The landscape of Steffeln was until 1968 defined by the 600 m-high Steffelskopf, which has now mostly been quarried away. The “pile transposed” (that is, the wedge-shaped charge) stands for this now vanished, cone-shaped mountain. The sword with the flame-shaped blade is Saint Michael's attribute, thus representing the municipality's and the church's patron saint. The two mullets (star shapes) come from another saintly attribute, the halo of stars associated with John of Nepomuk, who is venerated in the outlying centre of Auel.

== Culture and sightseeing ==
=== Buildings ===
- Saint Michael's Catholic Parish Church (Pfarrkirche St. Michael), Kirchweg 4 – aisleless church, possibly 1711, west tower from 1923; warriors’ memorial 1914-1918, Archangel Michael, expanded after 1945, basalt shaft cross, possibly from latter half of 18th century.
- Kirchweg 2 – former rectory, stately three-floor, essentially late mediaeval plastered building with outdoor stairway, skylight entrance from about 1737 (?).
- Near Lindenstraße 21 – wayside cross, basalt from 1791 (Corpus and saintly figure newer).
- Across the street from Marienweg 3 – former bakehouse with residential house, quarrystone built with ashlar masonry from 1728 and 1745; beside the entrance a shaft cross from 1760.

==== Auel ====
- Saint Mary's Catholic Church (branch church; Filialkirche St. Maria), An der Kirch 1 A – aisleless church from about 1760, parts older; west tower from 1833; in the churchyard grave crosses from the 17th to 19th century, elaborate Baroque Bildstock from 1730.
- Near Auf der Buch 15 – wayside cross, elaborate shaft cross, 18th or early 19th century.
- Hauptstraße – statue of John of Nepomuk dated 1763 and 1881.
- Near Hauptstraße 16 – wayside cross, shaft cross with peaked-gable niche from 1763.
- Near Hauptstraße 17 – shaft cross with lava base stone and Baroque shaft, both from 1713, finial cross (newer?) with new Corpus.
- Hauptstraße/corner of Zum Kläuschen – shaft cross with peaked-gable niche from the 18th or 19th century.
- Wayside cross, north of the village on the road to Lissingen – shaft cross from 1733 (replica?).

=== Nature ===
- The Eichholzmaar, one of the ten water-filled maars in the Volcanic Eifel, was renaturalised several years ago The maar lake has an area of about 11,000 m ². The Eichholzmaar has a maximum depth of just 3 metres. The little maar lake has become a refuge for rare birds in recent years. On the western shore is a birdwatching station.
