= Wiesbaum =

- Municipality
- Coat of arms

- Location of Wiesbaum within Vulkaneifel district
- Interactive map of Wiesbaum
- Location within Germany Location within Rhineland-Palatinate
- Coordinates: 50°20′26.46″N 6°40′11.55″E
- Country: Germany
- State: Rhineland-Palatinate
- District: Vulkaneifel
- Municipal assoc.: Gerolstein

Government
  - Mayor (2019–24): Ruxandra Gericke

Area
  - Total: 15.18 km^{2} (5.86 sq mi)
- Elevation: 485 m (1,591 ft)

Population (2025-12-31)
  - Total: 637
  - Density: 42.0/km^{2} (109/sq mi)
- Time zone: UTC+01:00 (CET)
  - Summer (DST): UTC+02:00 (CEST)
- Postal codes: 54578
- Dialling codes: 06593
- Vehicle registration: DAU
- Website: www.wiesbaum.eu

Wiesbaum is an Ortsgemeinde – a municipality belonging to a Verbandsgemeinde, a kind of collective municipality – in the Vulkaneifel district in Rhineland-Palatinate, Germany. It belongs to the Verbandsgemeinde of Gerolstein, whose seat is in the like-named town.

== Geography ==
=== Location ===
The municipality lies in the Vulkaneifel, a part of the Eifel known for its volcanic history, geographical and geological features, and even ongoing activity today, including gases that sometimes well up from the earth.

=== Constituent communities ===
The outlying centre of Mirbach is said to have been the seat of an old Rhenish noble family, the Lords of Mirbach, who in the early 20th century built a castle folly and the Chapel of the Redeemer there. On 17 March 1974, Mirbach, which until then had been self-administering, was amalgamated with Wiesbaum.

== History ==
In 804, Wiesbaum had its first documentary mention in a document that dealt with a territorial swap between Abbot Tankrad and a man named Beringar. Some holdings in Wiesbaum in the Eifelgau, which had earlier been given Tankrad's monastery along with fields, cropland, woods, meadows, grazing land and standing and flowing waters by a man named Gunthar, were now given Beringar, against which Beringar yielded up his holdings in Sefferweich in the Bitgau, some of which were his own, while others he had inherited from his mother Gomalinde. These consisted of lands, woods, fields, meadows, grazing land and standing and flowing waters. The document was drawn up by a monk named Landohic and dated 25 July “in the 30th year of our Lord and King Karl’s rule and in the 4th year of his empire”. The “Karl” named here is Charlemagne.

The Wiesbaum church was first mentioned in a Papal confirmation bull dated 31 March 1131 and issued by Pope Innocent II.

Wiesbaum was no stranger to witchhunts. In the 17th century, a local pastor named Hennes was tried and found guilty of witchcraft, whereupon he was sentenced to be burnt as a warlock.

== Politics ==
=== Municipal council ===
The council is made up of 12 council members, who were elected by majority vote at the municipal election held on 7 June 2009, and the honorary mayor as chairman.

=== Mayor ===
Wiesbaum's mayor is Ruxandra Gericke.

=== Coat of arms ===
The municipality's arms might be described thus: Per fess gules five annulets argent three and two, and argent a stag's attires fixed to the scalp sable.

The Schultheißerei of Wiesbaum belonged until the end of feudal times in 1794 to the County of Blankenheim as part of the Lordship of Jünkerath. This passed in 1469 into the ownership of the Counts of Manderscheid. The Knights of Wiesbaum bore in the black chief of their arms five silver rings, or annulets. These have been taken up into Wiesbaum's arms above the line of partition, although the field tincture here is gules (red) rather than sable (black). The outlying centre of Mirbach is bound with the old noble family of the same name, who kept their seat in Mirbach. Their arms bore silver stag's horns (“attires” in heraldry) on a black field, and this device can now be seen below the line of partition in the original tinctures. This same device can also still be seen on the windows at the Chapel of the Redeemer (Erlöserkapelle) in Mirbach.

== Culture and sightseeing ==
=== Buildings ===
- Saint Martin's Catholic Parish Church (Pfarrkirche St. Martin), Kirchstraße 8 – Baroque Revival church, 1927.
- Hauptstraße/corner of Üxheimer Straße – sandstone Crucifixion Bildstock from 1650.
- Marienstraße 7 – stately Quereinhaus (a combination residential and commercial house divided for these two purposes down the middle, perpendicularly to the street), integrated bakehouse/elderly residence, separate commercial building.
- Former Saint Martin's Catholic Parish Church, southeast of the village – nave and quire about 1500, sacristy 18th century; shaft cross from 1687 (?), walled churchyard with old trees.

==== Mirbach ====
- Catholic Chapel of the Redeemer (Erlöserkapelle), Kapellenstraße 1 – tuff aisleless church, 1902–1903; grave crosses, 17th/18th century; shaft cross from 1741.
- At Schulstraße 16 – house, 19th century, linked window, 17th century (?).
- Castle ruins, south of the village in a meadow – small folly, 1902.
- Wayside cross, southeast of the village in a field – shaft cross from 1739.
