= Lissendorf =

- Municipality
- Coat of arms

- Location of Lissendorf within Vulkaneifel district
- Interactive map of Lissendorf
- Location within Germany Location within Rhineland-Palatinate
- Coordinates: 50°18′59″N 6°36′29″E
- Country: Germany
- State: Rhineland-Palatinate
- District: Vulkaneifel
- Municipal assoc.: Gerolstein

Government
  - Mayor (2019–24): Rudolf Mathey

Area
  - Total: 10.37 km^{2} (4.00 sq mi)
- Elevation: 400–610 m (1,310–2,000 ft)

Population (2025-12-31)
  - Total: 1,109
  - Density: 106.9/km^{2} (277.0/sq mi)
- Time zone: UTC+01:00 (CET)
  - Summer (DST): UTC+02:00 (CEST)
- Postal codes: 54587
- Dialling codes: 06597
- Vehicle registration: DAU
- Website: www.lissendorf.net

Lissendorf is an Ortsgemeinde – a municipality belonging to a Verbandsgemeinde, a kind of collective municipality – in the Vulkaneifel district in Rhineland-Palatinate, Germany. It belongs to the Verbandsgemeinde of Gerolstein, whose seat is in the municipality of Gerolstein.

== Geography ==
=== Location ===
The municipality lies in the Vulkaneifel, a part of the Eifel known for its volcanic history, geographical and geological features, and even ongoing activity today, including gases that sometimes well up from the earth.

=== Climate ===
Yearly precipitation in Lissendorf amounts to 838 mm, which is rather high, falling into the highest third of the precipitation chart for all Germany. At 70% of the German Weather Service’s weather stations, lower figures are recorded. The driest month is April. The most rainfall comes in December. In that month, precipitation is 1.5 times what it is in April. Precipitation varies minimally. At only 5% of the weather stations are lower seasonal swings recorded.

== History ==
Lissendorf lies on the former Roman road between Trier and Cologne (Via Agrippa). Many sideroads favoured settlement in this area in Roman times. Roman graves that have been unearthed confirm this.

Lissendorf had its first documentary mention in Prüm Abbey’s directory of holdings, the Prümer Urbar, in 893. In the Middle Ages, a noble house named “von Lissendorf” was mentioned. This family never attained greatness outside this region, though.

Beginning in the 14th century, the village found itself in the hands of the House of Manderscheid-Blankenheim. In the 16th century, the village belonged to the County of Gerolstein. In the time of French rule, Lissendorf became the seat of the cantonal administration.

By the end of the 19th century, the local railway, the Eifelbahn between Trier and Cologne, had opened.

== Politics ==
=== Municipal council ===
The council is made up of 16 council members, who were elected by proportional representation at the municipal election held on 7 June 2009, and the honorary mayor as chairman. The 16 seats are shared among three voters’ groups.

=== Mayor ===
Lissendorf’s mayor is Rudolf Mathey.

=== Coat of arms ===
The German blazon reads: In Grün das goldene Geweih mit Grind eines Achtenders.

The municipality’s arms might in English heraldic language be described thus: Vert a stag’s attires, each with four points, fixed to the scalp Or.

The noble family von Lissendorf, mentioned above, bore arms with this charge. the stag’s attires (that is, antlers) fixed to the scalp, but it was no longer known what the correct tinctures were. The municipality simply chose vert (green) and Or (gold).

== Culture and sightseeing ==
Buildings:

- Saint Dionysius’s Catholic Parish Church (Pfarrkirche St. Dionysius), Kirchstraße 10, Romanesque Revival aisleless church, 1886-1887, sandstone Gothic Revival memorial cross, latter half of the 19th century.
- Am Bungert 20 – ten-axis, one-floor Quereinhaus (a combination residential and commercial house divided for these two purposes down the middle, perpendicularly to the street) from 18(?)5 (third digit in inscription unclear), late 19th century.
- Bahnhofstraße – signal box “Lf” (“Lissendorf-Fahrdienstleiter” – Lissendorf railway dispatcher), oldest still preserved lever signal box using pulled cables on the Eifelbahn, quarrystone walls partly with overhanging wood construction on the upper level.
- Bahnhofstraße 46 – two-floor solid building.
- Bahnhofstraße/corner of Wiesentalstraße – red sandstone Crucifixion Bildstock apparently possibly from 1613.
- Friedhofstraße – wayside chapel, plastered building from 1889.
- Friedhofstraße, graveyard – Gothic Revival red sandstone graveyard cross from 1876.
- Grausweg 5 – two-floor plastered building.
- Hauptstraße 21 – small Quereinhaus from 1829.
- Kirchstraße 33 – corner estate, bungalow from 1896; barn.
- Kirchstraße/corner of Burgstraße – wayside cross, sandstone niche cross possibly from the 18th century.
- Roslay 2 – two-floor plastered building.
- Wayside cross, northwest of the village on the Burgberg, former Station on a Way of the Cross, red sandstone from 1872.
- Wayside cross, southwest of the village on the road to Steffeln, red sandstone shaft cross from 18th or early 19th century.

== Economy and infrastructure ==
Lissendorf railway station lies on the Eifelbahn (Cologne–Euskirchen–Gerolstein–Trier), which is served by the following local passenger services:

- the Eifel-Express (Cologne–Euskirchen–Gerolstein with connection to Trier);
- the Eifel-Bahn (Cologne–Euskirchen–Kall, and at peak times on to Gerolstein).

In Lissendorf, the historical Dümpelfeld–Lissendorf railway, known as the Middle Ahrtalbahn (“Ahrtal Railway”, Jünkerath–Lissendorf–Hillesheim–Ahrdorf–Dümpelfeld) branched off.

For all local public transport, three tariff systems apply: the Verkehrsverbund Region Trier (VRT), the Verkehrsverbund Rhein-Sieg, and for journeys crossing tariff zones, the NRW-Tarif.
