= Kerpen, Rhineland-Palatinate =

Kerpen
- Municipality
- Coat of arms

- Location of Kerpen within Vulkaneifel district
- Interactive map of Kerpen
- Location within Germany Location within Rhineland-Palatinate
- Coordinates: 50°18′45″N 6°43′54″E
- Country: Germany
- State: Rhineland-Palatinate
- District: Vulkaneifel
- Municipal assoc.: Gerolstein

Government
  - Mayor (2019–24): Leonhard Emondts

Area
  - Total: 8.24 km^{2} (3.18 sq mi)
- Elevation: 450 m (1,480 ft)

Population (2025-12-31)
  - Total: 501
  - Density: 60.8/km^{2} (157/sq mi)
- Time zone: UTC+01:00 (CET)
  - Summer (DST): UTC+02:00 (CEST)
- Postal codes: 54578
- Dialling codes: 06593
- Vehicle registration: DAU
- Website: www.kerpen-eifel.de

Kerpen (Eifel) (German pronunciation: [ˈkɛʁpn̩]) is an Ortsgemeinde – a municipality belonging to a Verbandsgemeinde, a kind of collective municipality – in the Vulkaneifel district in Rhineland-Palatinate, Germany. It belongs to the Verbandsgemeinde of Gerolstein, whose seat is in the like-named town.

== Geography ==
=== Location ===
The municipality lies in the Vulkaneifel, a part of the Eifel known for its volcanic history, geographical and geological features, and even ongoing activity today, including gases that sometimes well up from the earth.

=== Constituent communities ===
Kerpen's Ortsteile are Loogh and Kerpen.

== History ==
Archaeological finds bear witness to human habitation in the Hillesheim limestone hollow between 600 and 400 BC. About 225 BC, the Treveri, a people of mixed Celtic and Germanic stock, from whom the Latin name for the city of Trier, Augusta Treverorum, is also derived, built a defensive structure on the Weinberg (mountain) near Kerpen. Beginning in 55 BC, Roman roads and villas began appearing in the Kerpen area.

Sometime between AD 600 and 700, the Franks had a village near what is now Kerpen, called “Stilsdorf”. Frankish graves have been found in and around Kerpen.

In 1136, Kerpen had its first documentary mention when “Sigibertus von Kerpen”, who is believed to have been the first to build a castle on the Höhenberg, was named in a document. Settlers from Stilsdorf settled at the foot of the castle. Sometime before 1197, the brothers Dietrich, Alexander and Albero von Kerpen endowed a convent in Niederehe. In 1201, Dietrich I von Kerpen was mentioned as the lord of the Manderscheid Lower Castle. At about this same time came Heinrich II von Kerpen, who is considered the “forefather of the Manderscheids”. Between 1200 and 1208, Otto von Kerpen was the second Grand Master of the Teutonic Knights.

In 1218, the outlying centre of Loogh had its first documentary mention in a donation of two homesteads, the Keulen-Häuser, by the Lords of Kerpen to the convent in Niederehe.

In 1265, Dietrich II von Kerpen enfeoffed Archbishop Engelbert of Cologne with Castle Kerpen. It is believed that Dietrich III von Kerpen took part in the Battle of Worringen in 1288. After 1300, Dietrich III's sons founded the lines of Linster, Mörsdorf and Warsberg. Between 1308 and 1324, there was a dispute between the Lords of Kerpen and Archbishop Heinrich of Cologne over patronage rights in the Parish of Wevelinghoven near Neuss. In 1327, Konrad and Dietrich von Kerpen divided the village of Gillenfeld. Between 1334 and 1345, the Archbishops of Trier and Cologne were granted the right to use Castle Kerpen as a military stronghold. In 1351, Archbishop Willhelm refused to compensate Lords Johann and Dietrich von Kerpen for their losses in the Westphalian War. The same year, Dietrich von Kerpen-Warsburg was enfeoffed with Illingen. Between 1354 and 1397, Dietrich von Kerpen-Mörsdorf was the abbot at Prüm Abbey, while Willhelm von Kerpen-Warsburg was the abbot at the Abbey of Echternach between 1359 and 1372. In 1360, Dietrich von Kerpen-Warsburg was Schenk (a high official at court, responsible for the wine cellar and vineyards, among other things) to the Archbishop of Cologne.

Sometime before 1400, Willhelm von Sombreff wed Magarete von Kerpen, Johann the Elder's daughter. Their son, also named Willhelm von Sombreff, was beginning in 1450 the sole owner of Castle Kerpen, and was, together with his own son, Friedrich, and one hundred armed men, in the service of Duke Arnold of Geldern and Jülich in 1459. The next year began the dispute over the wardship of the mad Friedrich von Saffenberg.

In 1471, Friedrich I von Sombreff wed Elisabeth von Neuenahr. Two years later, Friedrich found himself a Manderscheid confederate in the struggle against the Duke of Jülich. This seems to have unleashed a sequence of rather unfortunate events, for later in 1473, the family found itself at odds with the Manderscheids instead, in a dispute that lasted until 1478, during which time, in 1475, infighting broke out within the family Sombreff itself.

Friedrich I von Sombreff died in 1483, as did Dietrich IV in 1551, with the latter's son and successor, Dietrich V, following his father to the grave only nine years later, in 1560.

The years from 1560 to 1593 were those of Dietrich VI von Manderscheid's reign and he saw to it that the Reformation was spread throughout his holdings. After he died in Kerpen in 1593, his brother-in-law Philipp von der Marck seized, among other Manderscheid holdings, Castle Kerpen. In 1608, the Manderscheids tried to recover their castle by storming it, but they were held off. After Philipp's death in 1613, his son Ernst succeeded him.

The Thirty Years' War and its aftermath took their toll on Kerpen and Niederehe in the years between 1635 and 1652. In 1653, Ernst von der Marck died, and there followed disputes over his inheritance. Beginning in 1674, the Arenbergs were lords of the castle. Only four years later came the French. They destroyed the castle in 1682. The next year, a great fire destroyed two thirds of the village. In 1689, the French further destroyed the castle again, and this time the village, too.

In 1788, the first schools arose in the Lordship of Kerpen. In 1792, Kerpen's town gates were sold off into private ownership.

In 1794 began French rule, under which the Duke's and the convent's holdings were seized and sold off in 1804 and 1805. In 1814 or 1815, Kerpen was assigned to the Kingdom of Prussia at the Congress of Vienna.

Later in the 19th century, in 1850, came the beginnings of a regulated postal system. In 1858, the Kerpen dealers’ and livestock market, once held every year before Whitsun, was abolished. In 1895, Castle Kerpen was sold to Johann Dhün, and it was acquired by the painter, Fritz von Wille, in 1911.

In 1912, the first train arrived in Kerpen.

The current municipality of Kerpen was founded on 7 June 1969 out of the dissolved municipalities of Kerpen and Loogh.

== Politics ==
=== Municipal council ===
The council is made up of 12 council members, who were elected by majority vote at the municipal election held on 7 June 2009, and the honorary mayor as chairman.

=== Mayor ===
Kerpen's mayor is Leonhard Emondts.

=== Coat of arms ===
The German blazon reads: In Silber auf goldenem Dreiberg ein schwarzer Zinnenturm, belegt mit silbernem Schildchen, darin ein roter Zickzackbalken.

The municipality's arms might in English heraldic language be described thus: Argent in base a mount of three Or upon which a tower embattled of five sable charged with an inescutcheon of the field with a fess dancetty of three gules.

The black, crenellated (“embattled”, that is, with battlements) tower is a representation of the 23 m-tall keep, the dominant feature of Castle Kerpen and the seat of the Imperial Lordship of Kerpen (first documentary mention in 1136). On the keep's wall is an inescutcheon bearing the arms once borne by the Counts of Kerpen (1136–1400), heraldically “Argent a fess dancetty of three gules” (that is, a silver field upon which a horizontal zigzag red stripe with three peaks). The “mount of three” stands for the local mountains. This charge is called a Dreiberg in German heraldry, which literally means “three-mountain”, and the local mountains do indeed number three: the Weinberg (553 m), the Höhenberg (505 m) and the Ko-Berg (482 m).

The arms have been borne since 14 October 1950.

== Culture and sightseeing ==
=== Buildings ===
==== Kerpen ====
- Castle Kerpen (Burg Kerpen; monumental zone), remnants of a mediaeval castle, since 1682 a ruin, complex rising in several terraces, 12th to 16th century, Romanesque Bergfried (German-style keep), Kerpen's foremost landmark.
- Saint Sebastian’s Catholic Church (branch church; Filialkirche St. Sebastian), Im Kapelleneck 12, former castle chapel, inner weightbearing columns, 16th century; wayside cross from 1716.
- Adenauer Straße 1 – Quereinhaus (a combination residential and commercial house divided for these two purposes down the middle, perpendicularly to the street), roof with half-hipped gables from 1826.
- Bachstraße 2 – post-Baroque building with roof with half-hipped gables from 1807, more recent commercial building; whole complex.
- Across the street from Bachstraße 12 – remnants of the village fortifications, mentioned in 1475.
- Bachstraße 16/18 – former Quereinhaus, apparently from 1870.
- Eulersteierstraße 6 – estate along street, building with roof with half-hipped gables from 1841, possibly essentially older; commercial building, quarrystone, timber-frame gable.
- Fritz-von-Wille-Straße 12/13 – former courthouse, no.13 timber-frame, partly solid, 15th/16th century, no. 12 from after 1917 on top of solid ground floor built with salvaged timber-framing jetties, from 1830 and 1848.
- Im Kapelleneck 2 – house, possibly essentially 17th century.
- Irrweg 1 – five-axis plaster building from 1821.
- Kapelleneck 3 – former Burgmann’s seat, house with spiral stairway and gateway with coat of arms from [16?]23
- Niedereher Straße/corner of Irrweg – wayside cross, basalt beam cross from 1693.
- So-called Rotes Kreuz (“Red Cross”) northeast of the village on the road to Niederehe, near municipal limits, sandstone shaft cross from 1793.
- Wayside chapel, east of the village on the way into Castle Kerpen, quarrystone building, about 1900?
- Wayside cross, northeast of the village on the road to Niederehe, sandstone shaft cross from 1710.
- Wayside cross, east of the village next to the wayside chapel, sandstone shaft cross from 1793.
- Wayside cross, northeast of the village at the side of the road to Niederehe, basalt beam cross from 1716.

==== Loogh ====
- Saints Wendelin's, Joseph's and Barbara's Catholic Church (branch church; Filialkirche St. Wendelin, Joseph und Barbara), biaxial aisleless church, 1763, Baroque red sandstone shaft cross, possibly from latter half of 18th century.
- Wayside cross, northeast of the village on the road to Niederehe, sandstone shaft cross from 1758.
- Wayside cross, northwest of the village on the old way to Kerpen, beam cross, apparently from 1773.
