= Oberehe-Stroheich =

- Municipality
- Coat of arms

- Location of Oberehe-Stroheich within Vulkaneifel district
- Interactive map of Oberehe-Stroheich
- Location within Germany Location within Rhineland-Palatinate
- Coordinates: 50°16′45.86″N 6°46′10.78″E
- Country: Germany
- State: Rhineland-Palatinate
- District: Vulkaneifel
- Municipal assoc.: Gerolstein

Area
  - Total: 10.30 km^{2} (3.98 sq mi)
- Elevation: 461 m (1,512 ft)

Population (2025-12-31)
  - Total: 324
  - Density: 31.5/km^{2} (81.5/sq mi)
- Time zone: UTC+01:00 (CET)
  - Summer (DST): UTC+02:00 (CEST)
- Postal codes: 54578
- Dialling codes: 06595
- Vehicle registration: DAU

Oberehe-Stroheich is an Ortsgemeinde – a municipality belonging to a Verbandsgemeinde, a kind of collective municipality – in the Vulkaneifel district in Rhineland-Palatinate, Germany. It belongs to the Verbandsgemeinde of Gerolstein, whose seat is in the like-named town.

== Geography ==
The municipality lies in the Vulkaneifel, a part of the Eifel known for its volcanic history, geographical and geological features, and even ongoing activity today, including gases that sometimes well up from the earth.

== History ==
Castle Oberehe was built between 1696 and 1698 as a fortified manor house by Johann Christoph von Veyder, Lord at Malberg. It has two unique towers.

In the parish church is the grave of Auxiliary Bishop of Cologne Werner von Veyder. Stroheich’s chapel dates from the 11th century.

The municipality of Oberehe-Stroheich came into being on 7 November 1970 through the merger of the two formerly self-administering municipalities of Oberehe and Stroheich.

== Politics ==
=== Municipal council ===
The council is made up of 12 council members, who were elected by majority vote at the municipal election held on 7 June 2009, and the honorary mayor as chairman.

=== Coat of arms ===
The German blazon reads: In gespaltenem Schild vorne in Gold ein grünes, aufwärts gerichtetes Eichenblatt mit Eichel, hinten in Grün drei fünfblättrige silberne Blumen mit rotem Butzen pfahlweise.

The municipality’s arms might in English heraldic language be described thus: Per pale Or an oakleaf palewise with an acorn vert and vert three flowers with five petals each palewise argent seeded of the first.

== Culture and sightseeing ==
=== Buildings ===
==== Oberehe ====
- Saint James’s Catholic Parish Church (Pfarrkirche St. Jacob), Hauptstraße 31 – Gothic Revival quarrystone aisleless church, 1900/1901; whole complex with rectory (Hauptstraße 33).
- Castle, Hauptstraße 19 – fortified manor house, three-floor lordly manor, timber-frame gallery, gatehouse, 1696-1698.
- Döhmstraße, graveyard – Gothic Revival red sandstone cross from 1872.
- Döhmstraße/corner of Dreisfeldstraße – Heiligenhäuschen (a small, shrinelike structure consecrated to a saint or saints), Gothic false gable.
- Hauptstraße 21 – timber-frame house, partly solid, from 1872, date of timber-framing unclear.
- Hauptstraße 33 – Catholic rectory, Gothic Revival quarrystone building with half-hipped roof, 1906; whole complex with Saint James’s Parish Church (Hauptstraße 31).
- Hauptstraße 37 – Quereinhaus (a combination residential and commercial house divided for these two purposes down the middle, perpendicularly to the street) from 1863.
- Schulstraße 6 – one-and-a-half-floor house, partly timber-frame, from 1854, apparently essentially older.

==== Stroheich ====
- Saint Agatha’s Catholic Church (branch church; Filialkirche St. Agatha), Gartenstraße – aisleless church, early 16th century, shaft cross from 1759.
- Gartenstraße 11 – estate along street, house from 1808 (?), quarrystone commercial building.
- Lindenplatz 1 – Quereinhaus from 1886.
- Wolfskaul 2 – Quereinhaus from 1876.
- Wayside cross, southeast of the village in the field, basalt beam cross from 1682 (? – last digit unclear).
- Wayside cross, basalt beam cross from 1688.
