= Flurbereinigung =

German legal process for agricultural land aggregation

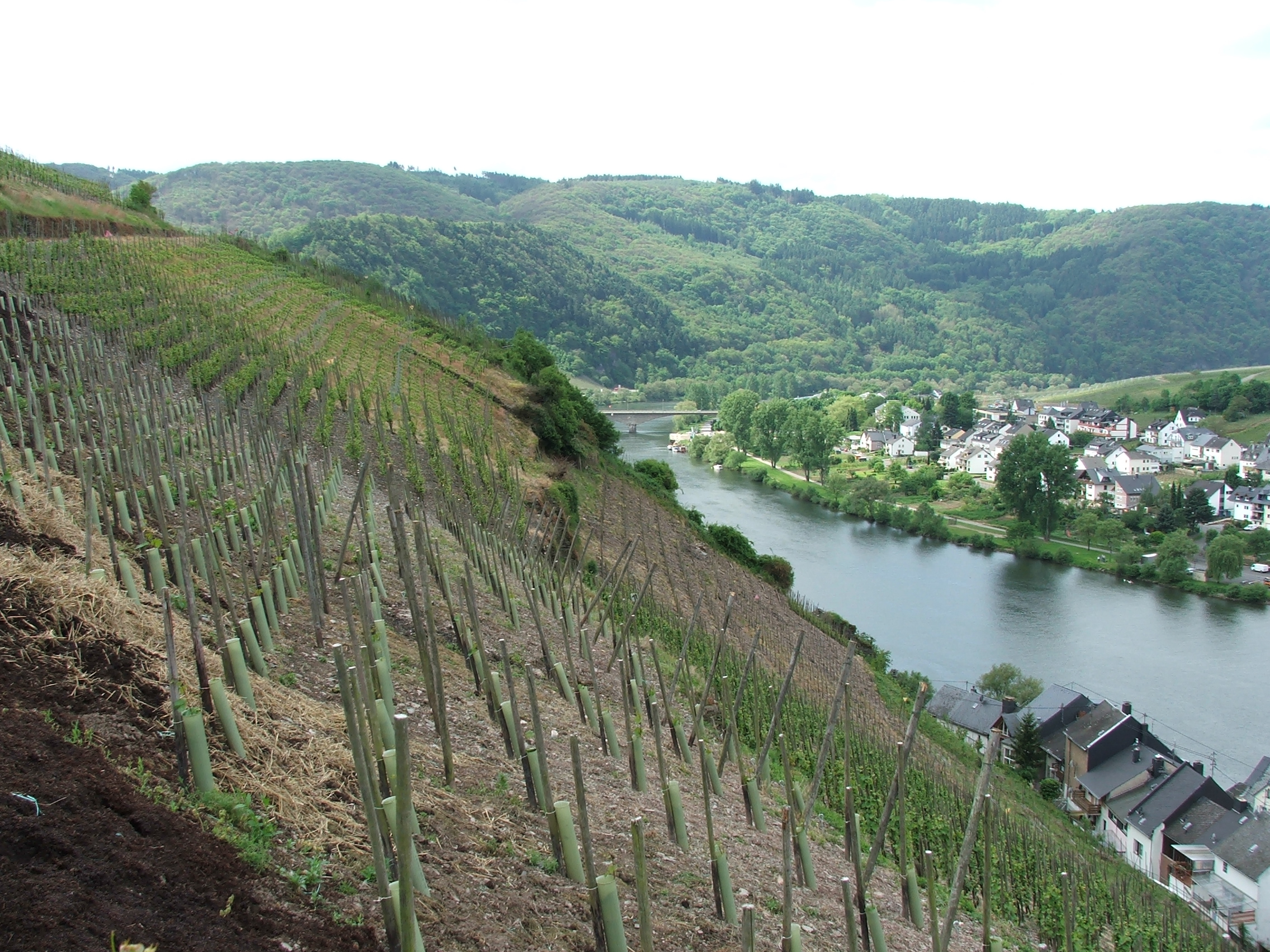
A steep vineyard along the Moselle

Flurbereinigung (German pronunciation: [ˈfluːɐ̯bəˌʁaɪ̯nɪɡʊŋ]) is the German word best translated as land consolidation. Unlike the land reforms carried out in the socialist countries of the Eastern Bloc, including East Germany, the idea of Flurbereinigung was not so much to distribute large quasi-feudal holdings to the formerly landless rural workers and/or to kolkhoz-style cooperatives, but rather to correct the situation where after centuries of equal division of the inheritance of small farmers among their heirs and unregulated sales, most farmers owned many small non-adjacent plots of land, making access and cultivation difficult and inefficient. Two other European countries where this kind of land reform has been carried out are France (remembrement) and the Netherlands (ruilverkaveling).

Although these reforms had been anticipated by agricultural planners since the beginning of the 19th century, they were not executed in grand scale until the time about 1950. These reforms sought to improve agricultural efficiency and support the infrastructure. In 1953 a law called the Flurbereinigungsgesetz was passed in Germany, with the latest amendment in 1976. After criticism about loss of biodiversity caused by large-scale land reforms began to be voiced in the late 1970s, the restoration of the natural environment became another objective.

== Reasons for land consolidation ==
The process of Flurbereinigung was accelerated greatly after the Second World War, due to the need for inexpensive agricultural products. At the same time the population in West Germany underwent a rapid increase caused by millions of refugees from the former eastern territories of Germany. The idea was first to restructure the landholdings by consolidating geographically unconnected fields under the same ownership, thus reducing labor and cultivation costs. As a second step, agricultural infrastructures like dirt roads and farming machinery were heavily improved. That process also included regulating streams and straightening country roads. As a result, the Flurbereinigung radically reshaped large areas of German agriculture, including the German wine industry. First taking shape in land consolidation legislation passed in the 1950s as part of an overhaul of the structuring of German agriculture, the Flurbereinigung would see many landscapes rearranged and physically reshaped, for example with respect to building access roads to make agriculture more effective.

== Reason for restructuring vineyards ==
Many German wine regions, like the Mosel, have their vineyards planted on steep terraces along riverbanks to maximize the climate benefits of the nearby river. Often these vineyards were planted before mechanical harvesting was widely used and had to be laboriously picked by hand. Another disadvantage was the lack of ideal drainage in some of these vineyards where either too much or too little water was retained for the vine to sustain quality production.

== Process and benefits ==
With help from the federal and state governments many German vineyard owners were able to redesign and replant their vineyards to optimize maintenance and harvesting. Several vineyards also took the opportunity to upgrade their plantings from the lower-quality Müller-Thurgau grape to the high-quality Riesling vine. Some wine areas also improved the roads and access to their vineyards to increase tourism potential. In some cases, parcels of land that were spread out over different areas were reallocated among vineyard owners to reduce production cost.

In areas where wine is not produced, it is normally the size of the parcels and the quality of the infrastructure which are improved through land consolidation. Later on, environmental protection and community and regional development became important goals.

Flurbereiningung affects owners and leaseholders of the affected land, as well rightsholders of the land lots, municipalities, public agencies and farmer associations. The participants may incorporate to a body of public rights which is controlled by a public authority and called a Teilnehmergemeinschaft, best translated as "participant association". According to the Flurbereinigungsgesetz these bodies may form a union within a state. All unions have been integrated into the Bundesverband der Teilnehmergemeinschaften, the federal alliance of participant associations.

The outcome of a Flurbereiningung should lead to the greatest benefit for the participants but also for the general public. Public roads and infrastructure such as channels are built, creeks are straightened, land improvement is carried out, and the landscape is rearranged according to regional development and country planning. Thereafter roads and infrastructure are normally in possession of the municipality. It is desirable that the estates of land are distributed as homogeneously as possible among the participants. As this is not always possible, legal actions against the redistributions are common.

== Negative example ==
A very negative example of Flurbereinigung occurred in the first half of the 1970s at Kaiserstuhl (Baden-Württemberg), when great terraces were created with a slope towards the hillside. The idea was to store water in the area, but heavy rains in 1983 led to flooding. Moreover, due to the inclination of the terraces in springtime (blooming time of the wine) cold air settled, leading to frequent frost damage to the crops.

== See also ==
- Enclosure
