= Shaft cross =

A shaft cross (German: Schaftkreuz) is a specific type of Latin or High cross, named after its method of construction. The majority of these external monuments consist of the cross or crucifix itself. The cross or crucifix is usually made of stone (often sandstone), occasionally of wood or, more rarely, of metal, and sits above a shaft (pillar or column) almost always made of stone, which is fixed to a foundation or base.

They may take various forms from a plain cross formed from two beams, a wayside shrine, a complex cross (Gliederkreuz) or a niche cross (Nischenkreuz) – but may also have elements of the variations, for example a niche in the upright post of the cross. It is thus a more elaborate and usually higher form of the simple stone cross. Shaft crosses are mostly found as wayside crosses or occasionally by churches or on cemeteries in predominantly Roman Catholic regions such as the Rhineland of Germany.
