= Prüm (river) =

River in Germany

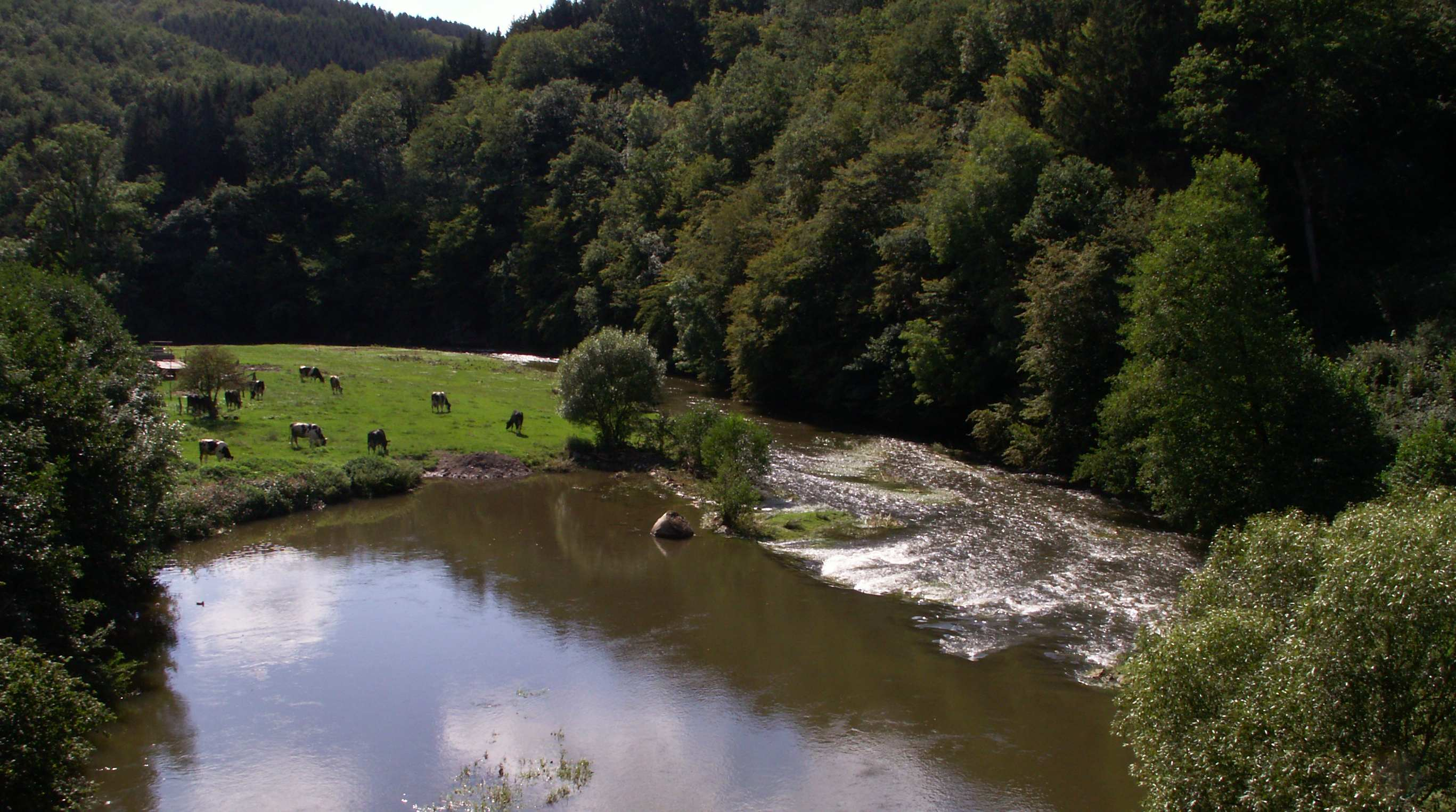
- The Prüm near Waxweiler

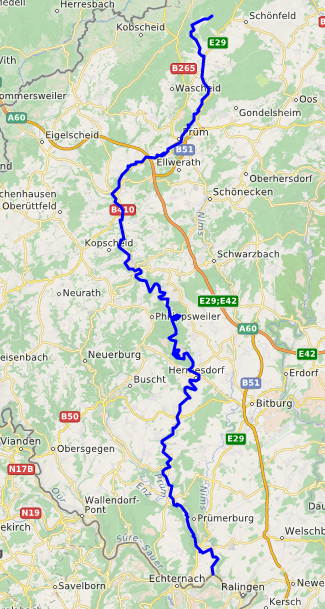
- Course of the Prüm

Location
- Country: Germany
- State: Rhineland-Palatinate
- Districts: Vulkaneifel and Bitburg-Prüm
- Region: Eifel
- Reference no.: DE: 2628

Physical characteristics
- Source
  - location: Between Ormont and Reuth on the Schneifelridge
  - coordinates: 50°18′53″N 6°28′8.8″E
  - elevation: ca. 650 m above sea level (NHN)
- Mouth
  - location: in Minden into the Sauer
  - coordinates: 49°49′22″N 6°28′16.1″E
  - elevation: ca. 154 m above sea level (NHN)
- Length: 95.04 km (59.06 mi)
- Basin size: 888.758 km^{2} (343.151 sq mi)
- Discharge
  - location: at its mouth
  - average: 11.42 m³/s

Basin features
- Progression: Sauer→ Moselle→ Rhine→ North Sea
- Landmarks: Small towns: Prüm; Villages: Neuendorf, Olzheim, Watzerath, Pittenbach, Pronsfeld, Lünebach, Merlscheid, Kinzenburg, Waxweiler, Niederpierscheid, Mauel, Echtershausen, Hamm, Wiersdorf, Wißmannsdorf, Brecht, Oberweis, Bettingen, Wettlingen, Peffingen, Holsthum, Prümzurlay, Irrel, Menningen, Minden
- Tributaries
  - left: Nims
  - right: Enz
- Waterbodies: Reservoirs: Bitburg Reservoir
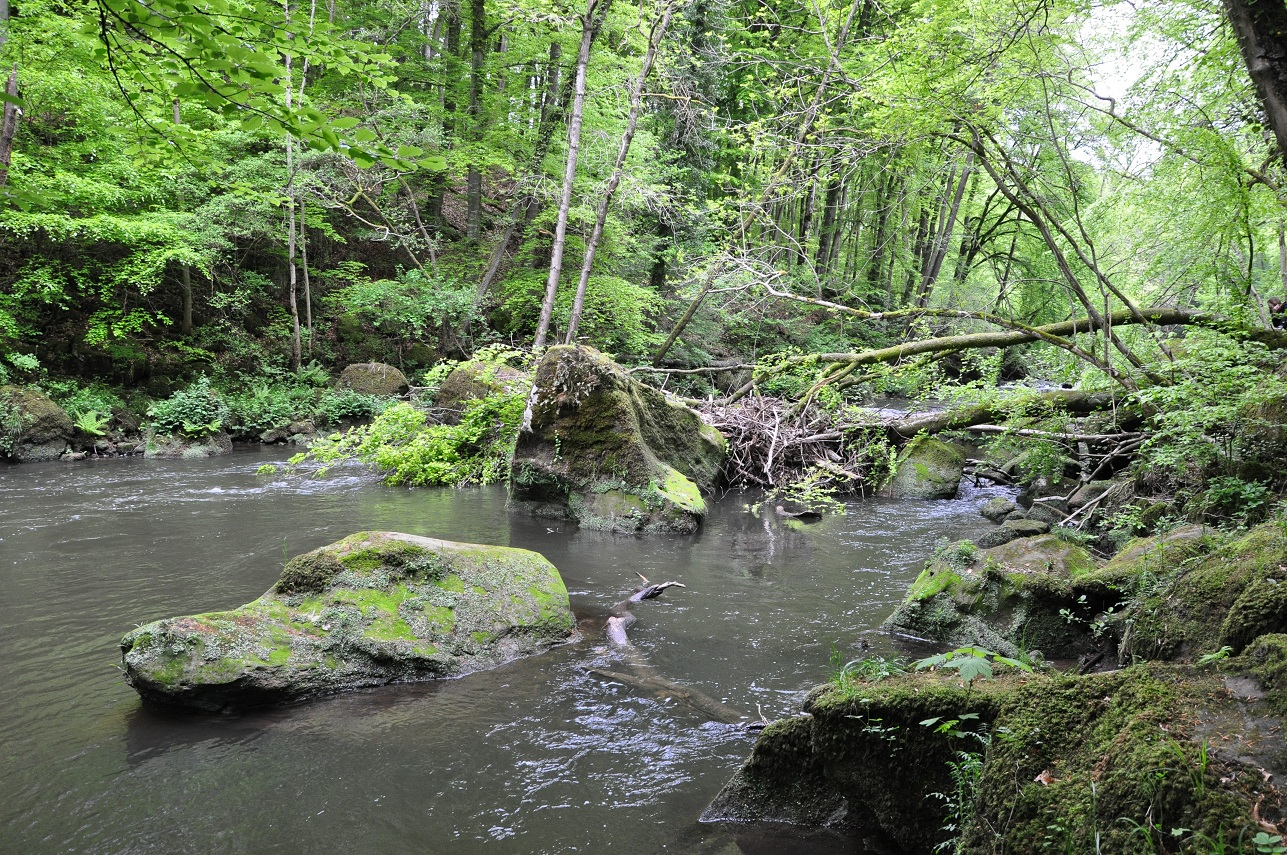
- The Prüm between Prümzurlay and Irrel

The Prüm (German pronunciation: [ˈpʁʏm]) is a river in Rhineland-Palatinate, Germany, left tributary of the Sauer.

Its total length is 95 km (59 mi), and its basin area is 889 km^{2} (343 sq mi). The Prüm rises in the Schneifel hills, north of the town of Prüm, close to the border with Belgium. It flows southward through Prüm, Waxweiler, Holsthum, and Irrel. The Prüm discharges to the Sauer in Minden, on the border with Luxembourg, three kilometres east of Echternach. The largest tributary of the Prüm is the Nims.

== Catchment and tributaries ==
The catchment of the Prüm is 888.758 km^{2} (343.151 sq mi) in area. The largest tributaries of the Prüm are (l = left bank (dark blue), r = right bank (light blue)):

- Mehlenbach (r), 14.3 km (8.9 mi), before Watzerath
- Mönbach (r), 9.8 km (6.1 mi), after Watzerath
- Alfbach (r), 22.3 km (13.9 mi), near Pronsfeld
- Bierbach (r), 9.8 km (6.1 mi), after Pronsfeld
- Echtersbach (r), 7.3 km (4.5 mi), before Brecht
- Enz (r), 37.9 km (23.5 mi), in Holsthum
- Nims (l), 61.4 km (38.2 mi), at Irrel

== See also ==
- List of rivers of Rhineland-Palatinate
