= Alfbach (Prüm) =

River in Germany

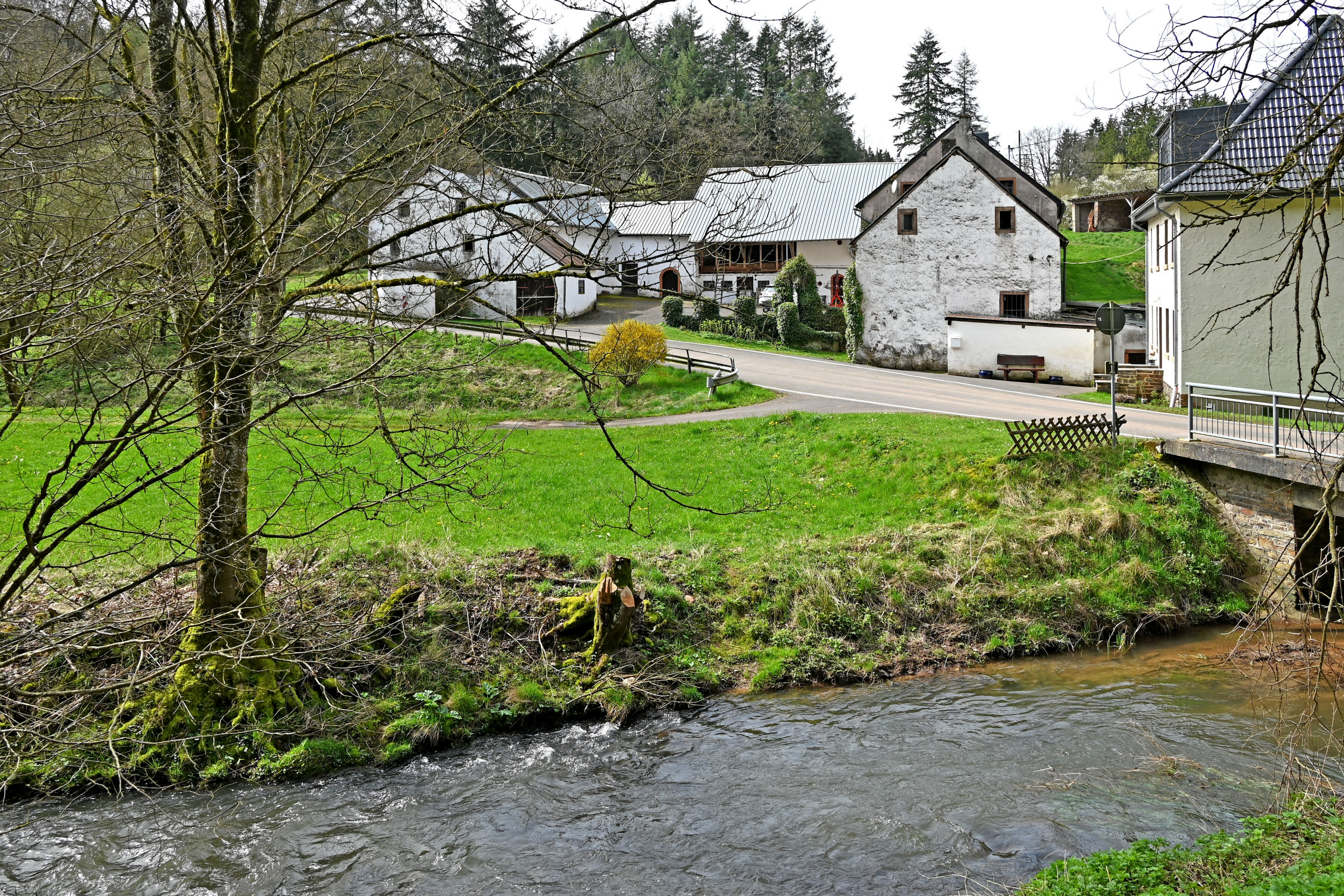
- The Alfbach at Habscheider Mühle (part of Habscheid)

Location
- Country: Germany
- State: Rhineland-Palatinate
- Reference no.: DE: 26284

Physical characteristics
- Source
  - location: Northeast of Buchet
  - coordinates: 50°15′51″N 6°21′31″E
  - elevation: ca. 631 m above sea level (NHN)
- Mouth
  - location: West of Pronsfeld into the Prüm
  - coordinates: 50°09′31″N 6°19′58″E
  - elevation: ca. 365 m above sea level (NHN)
- Length: 22.254 km
- Basin size: 55.693 km^{2} (21.503 sq mi)

Basin features
- Progression: Prüm→ Sauer→ Moselle→ Rhine→ North Sea
- Landmarks: Villages: Buchet, Bleialf, Pronsfeld

The Alfbach is a 22.3-kilometre-long (13.9 mi), orographically right-bank tributary of the Prüm in the district of Bitburg-Prüm in the German state of Rhineland-Palatinate.

== Geography ==
=== Course ===
The Alfbach rises in the Schneifel at a height of 631 m above sea level (NHN). Its source lies on the northern slopes of the Schwarzer Mann (697.8 m above NHN) about three kilometres northeast of Halenfeld in the municipality of Buchet.

The stream flows initially in a southwesterly direction to Halenfeld, where it collects its main tributary, the Donsbach, then turns south as far as Buchet, before changing direction to the southwest to continue through Bleialf. Near Großlangenfeld it changes its direction again to the south and, at the Hauscheid Mill (‘’Hauscheider Mühle’’) passes under the A 60 motorway. Continuing mainly in a southeasterly direction the Alfbach empties into the Prüm west of Pronsfeld at a height of 365 m above NHN.

=== Catchment ===
The Alfbach drains a catchment area of 55.693 km^{2} (21.503 sq mi) ; its waters flowing via the Prüm, Sauer, Moselle and Rhine to the North Sea.

=== Tributaries ===
Name	Left/right tributary	Length [km]	Catchment [km^{2}]	Mouth elevation [m above NHN]	Mouth location Coordinates	GKZ
Alfquelle	right	1.123	0.652	561	50.266337°N 6.343368°E	26284-12
Große Quelle	left	0.895	0.242	536	50.263025°N 6.336534°E	26284-132
Alfbachgraben	left	1.120	0.353	532	50.262537°N 6.334665°E	26284-14
Lange Alfquelle	left	1.662	0.644	514	50.260178°N 6.327351°E	26284-16
Mombach	right	1.422	1.448	508	northeast of Halenfeld 50.259697°N 6.324997°E	26284-18
Donsbach	right	4.177	6.068	489	in Halenfeld 50.255369°N 6.315417°E	26284-2
Steinbach	left	1.280	2.202	476	near Niederlascheid 50.247584°N 6.314461°E	26284-32
Dürenbach	right	2.967	3.915	452	in Bleialf 50.239261°N 6.297054°E	26284-4
Sonnenbach	right	0.674	0.742	441	south of Bleialf 50.23309°N 6.285194°E	26284-52
Üchenbach	left	3.607	4.215	439	south of Bleialf 50.231819°N 6.283999°E	26284-6
Waleschbach	right	0.663	0.625	434	southwest of Bleialf 50.228475°N 6.277582°E	26284-712
Lautersbach, auch Laubertsbach	right	0.387	0.323	432	50.225165°N 6.274924°E	26284-714
Katzenbach	right	1.195	1.468	425	near Großlangenfeld 50.220601°N 6.271856°E	26284-716
Eisbach	left	1.975	1.484	421	west of Brandscheid 50.216133°N 6.278431°E	26284-72
Eisbach	right	1.362	0.971	418	west of Brandscheid 50.213906°N 6.27966°E	26284-7312
Tunenbach	right	1.869	1.236	407	northeast of Habscheid 50.200746°N 6.283311°E	26284-7314
Hollbach	right	2.776	2.907	404	northeast of Habscheid 50.196665°N 6.284754°E	26284-74
Paulsgraben	right	0.618	0.442	403	east of Habscheid 50.192092°N 6.289006°E	26284-7992
Waldgraben	right	0.591	0.290	394	east of Habscheid 50.188423°N 6.299852°E	26284-7994
Vierenbach	left	2.601	3.469	390	east of Habscheid 50.18531°N 6.308406°E	26284-8
Schinnbach	left	2.393	1.631	387	east of Habscheid 50.182709°N 6.31095°E	26284-92
Schwarzbach	left	1.538	1.008	387	southeast of Habscheid 50.18165°N 6.313829°E	26284-94
Bosborn	right	0.985	0.690	381	southeast of Habscheid 50.175588°N 6.316106°E	26284-96

== See also ==
- List of rivers of Rhineland-Palatinate
