= Alfbach =

Alfbach may refer to the following rivers in Germany:

- Alf (river), a left tributary of the Moselle
- Alfbach (Prüm), a right tributary of the Prüm
