= Prüm Syncline =

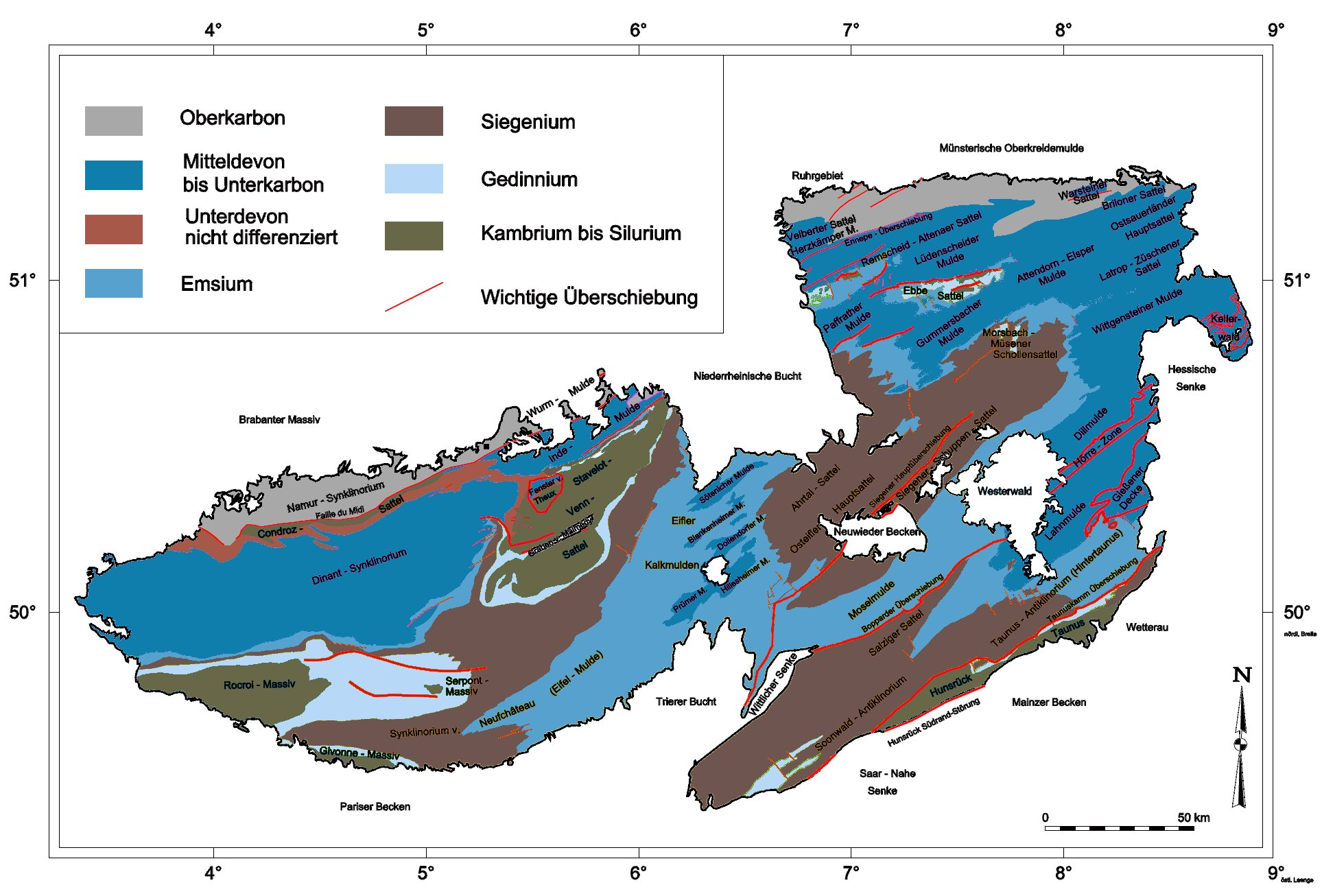
The limestone basins of the Eifel on the line between the Lower Rhine Bay in the north and the Trier Bay in the south.

The Prüm Syncline, Prüm Limestone Basin (German: Prümer Kalkmulde) or Prüm Basin (Prümer Mulde) is a landscape unit of the southern Limestone Eifel in Germany, which in turn is part of the Eifel mountain range. The region lies in the German state of Rhineland-Palatinate. The Prüm Limestone Basin has an area of 240 km^{2} and is the largest of the Eifel limestone basins. Geologically it contains dolomite formed from the fringing reefs or barrier reefs of the Devonian on the edge of the Rheno-Hercynian Basin mixed with rocks of other earth-historical periods. It is named after the largest settlement in the region, the town of Prüm, and the River Prüm, whose right bank running from northeast to southwest marks the western boundary of the basin. In the east the basin extends beyond the village of Büdesheim almost to the Gerolstein Basin and the Hillesheim/Ahrdorf Basin, whose borders in the Upper Bettingen bunter sandstone region are unclear. In the southwest the basin runs from Schönecken with the exposed rock formations of the Schönecker, Switzerland in the direction of Daleiden. The region lies at an average height of 500 to 550 metres above sea level.

== Literature ==
- Robert Richter, Zum Entstehen und Werden der Prümer Kalkmulde In: Heimatkalender / Landkreis Bitburg-Prüm. - (1991), pp. 186–189. - Ill., graph. Darst.
- Robert Richter, Landschaften der Westeifel: der Dolomitenkern der Prümer Kalkmulde In: Der Prümer Landbote. - 30 (2011), 3 = Nr. 110, pp. 52–56. - Ill.
- Wilhelm Meyer, Geologie der Eifel; 4. Aufl. 2013, Schweizerbart; Stuttgart
- Ludwig Happel und H. T. Reuling (1937) Die Geologie der Prümer Mulde. - Abhandlung der Senckenbergischen Naturforschenden Gesellschaft, Frankfurt/M. (Senckenberg-Buch 5)
- H. J. Jungheim (2000) Eifel-Brachiopoden, Korb
- W. Struve (1961) Zur Stratigraphie der südlichen Eifeler Kalkmulden (Devon: Emsium, Eifelium, Givetium). - Senckenbergiana lethaea, Frankfurt/M.
- R. Werner (1980) Geologische Wanderungen zwischen Prüm und Schönecken; Prüm
