= Prüm =

- Town
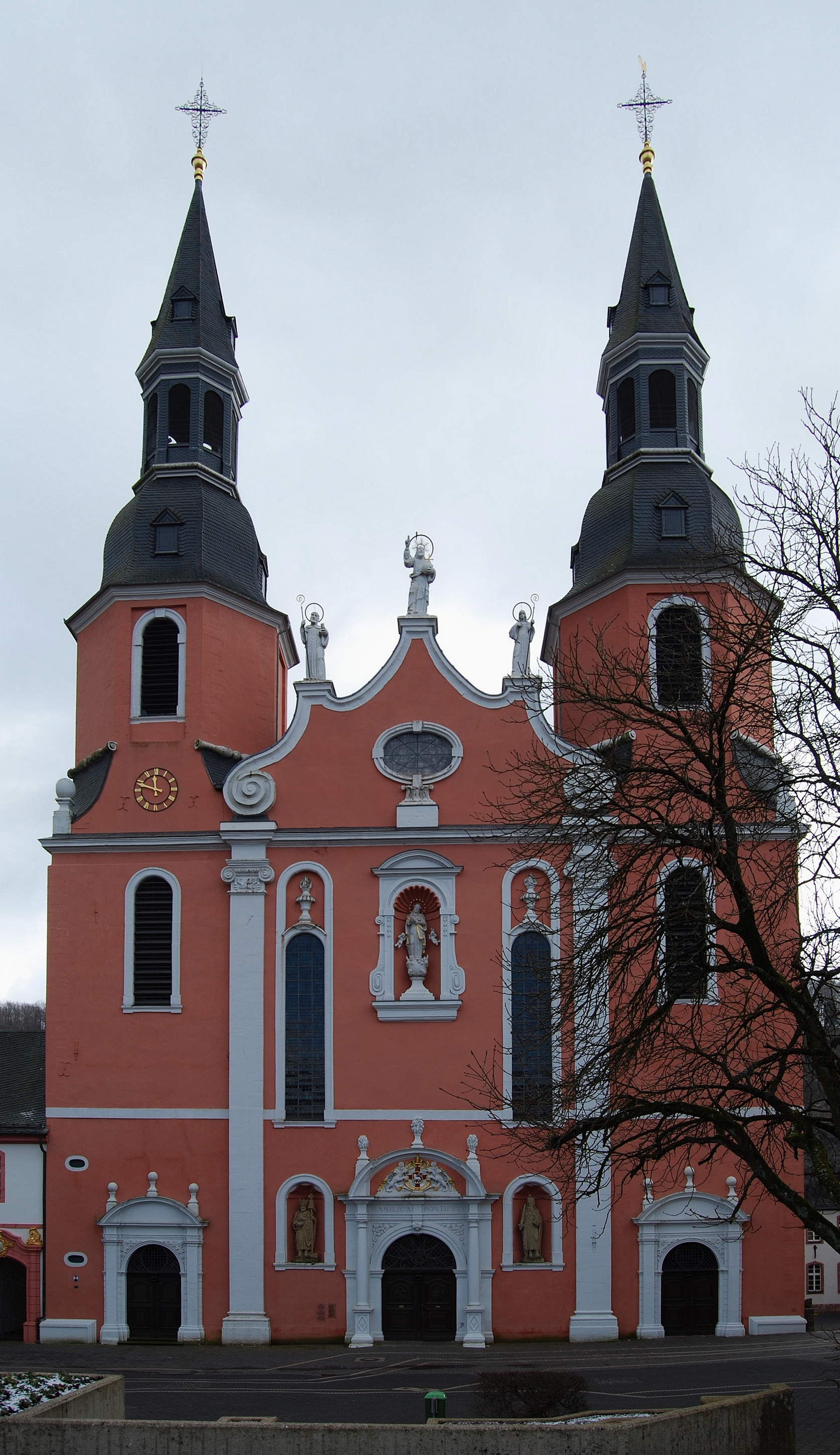
- Basilica of the Saviour

- Coat of arms

- Location of Prüm within Eifelkreis Bitburg-Prüm district
- Interactive map of Prüm
- Location within Germany Location within Rhineland-Palatinate
- Coordinates: 50°12′29″N 6°25′28″E
- Country: Germany
- State: Rhineland-Palatinate
- District: Eifelkreis Bitburg-Prüm
- Municipal assoc.: Prüm
- Subdivisions: 5 Stadtteile

Government
  - Mayor (2025–29): Markus Fischbach (SPD)

Area
  - Total: 22.87 km^{2} (8.83 sq mi)
- Elevation: 460 m (1,510 ft)

Population (2025-12-31)
  - Total: 5,276
  - Density: 230.7/km^{2} (597.5/sq mi)
- Time zone: UTC+01:00 (CET)
  - Summer (DST): UTC+02:00 (CEST)
- Postal codes: 54595
- Dialling codes: 06551
- Vehicle registration: BIT, PRÜ
- Website: www.stadtpruem.de

Prüm (German pronunciation: [ˈpʁʏm]) is a town in the Westeifel (Rhineland-Palatinate), Germany. Formerly a district capital, today it is the administrative seat of the Verbandsgemeinde ("collective municipality") Prüm.

== Geography ==
Prüm lies on the river Prüm (a tributary of the Sauer) at the southeastern end of the Schneifel, which is 697 m high. Prüm is eponymous for the Prüm syncline (Ger. Prümer Kalkmulde), the largest of the Eifel-lime-synclines. Here, the only GSSP-point in Germany identifies the geological border between the lower Devonian Emsian and the middle Devonian Eifelian.

== History ==
See main article on the town's former monastery, Prüm Abbey. In 2005, the Prüm Convention was signed in the city by several European countries.

Ninety-two percent of the town was destroyed by bombing and ground fighting during the Second World War. In 1949, it was wrecked again by an explosion on the Kalvarienberg hill caused by a fire in an underground ammunition bunker. Twelve people were killed, 15 injured and 965 left homeless.

== Economy and infrastructure ==
=== Economy ===
Among the largest employers in the region are MUH Arla, Stihl, Streif, Prüm-Türenwerk and Tesla Grohmann Automation. MUH Arla has its head office at Pronsfeld, 10 kilometres away.

=== Transport ===
Since 1980 it has not been possible to take the train to Prüm, with the exception of freight trains that operated up to the end of the 1990s. In December 2000 the last train went through Prüm, and this was a special event. Since that time, the rail tracks have been dismantled.

The federal highway B265 and B410 cross in Prüm, the autobahn A60 and B51 also run near the city.

Prüm Air Station is located just outside Prüm and is operated by the United States Air Force.

== Prümer Sommer ==
In July and August Prüm Summer takes place. It begins with a market and a music competition on the streets on the last Sunday in June. During the next eight Thursdays, various guests meet at the town hall, where there are various competitions, such as a beer jug lift and trunk sawing. There is also a bicycle rally, a fashion show, and dances included in the program.

== International relations ==
Prüm is twinned with: Bangor, Northern Ireland; Monthermé (France, since 1962); Fort Madison, Iowa (United States, since 1998)

== Notable people ==
- Hunfrid of Prüm, Frankish-German Benedictine monk, died 871, origin of the Humphrey name.
- Regino of Prüm, Benedictine monk and chronicler, died 915.
- It seems that Pepin the Hunchback, first son of Charlemagne, was in exile in a monastery in Prüm from ca. 793 to his death in 813.
