= MUH =

MUH or Muh may refer to:

- Marsa Matruh International Airport, Egypt (IATA code)
- Mathematical universe hypothesis, a "theory of everything"
- MUH Arla, a major German dairy company
- Robert A. Muh (born 1938), American entrepreneur and philanthropist
- Mercy University Hospital, Cork, Ireland
- Macquarie University Hospital, Sydney, Australia
- Mint unhinged stamp, a postage stamp that has never been mounted
