= Explosion crater =

Type of crater

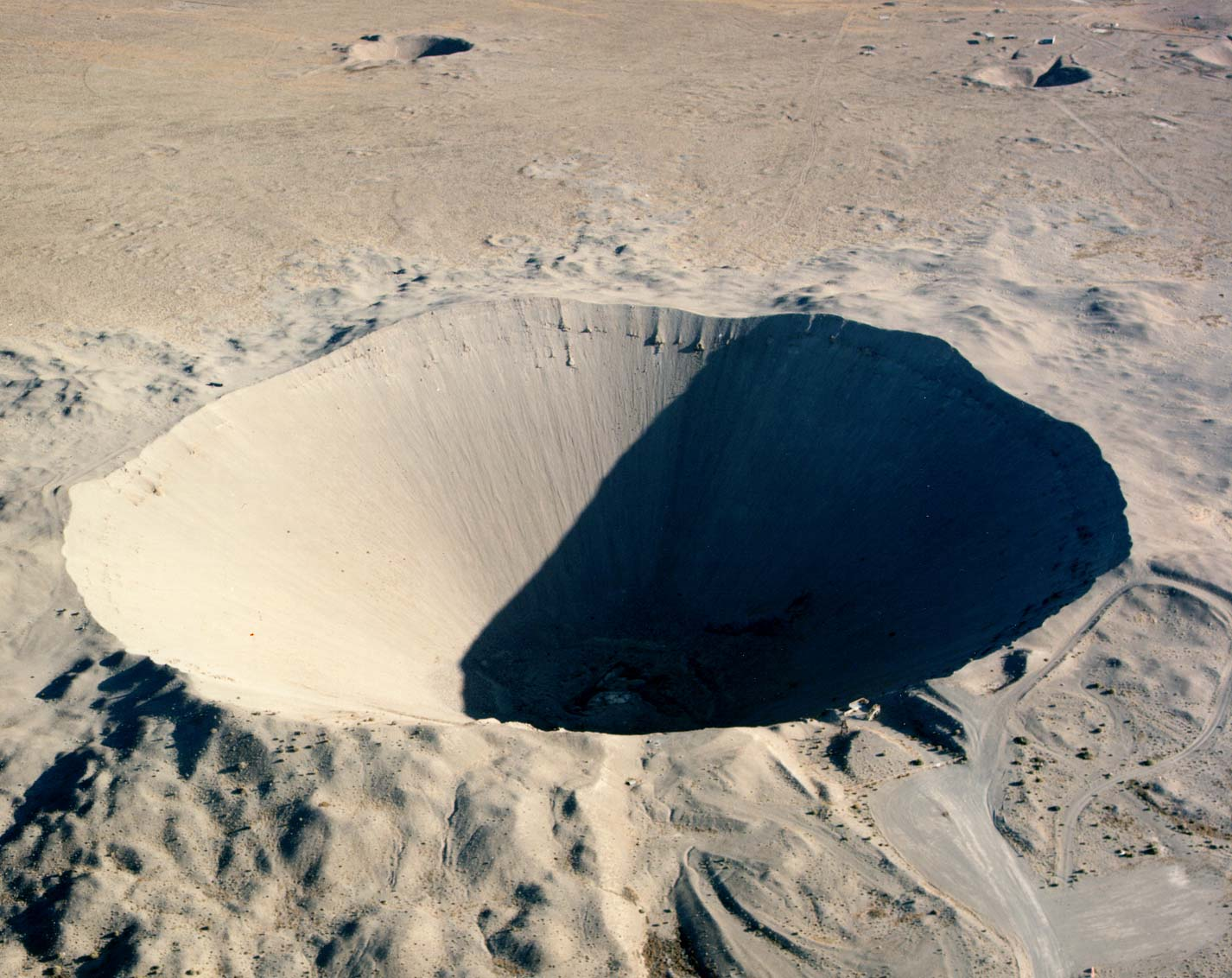
Crater created by the Sedan shallow underground nuclear test explosion

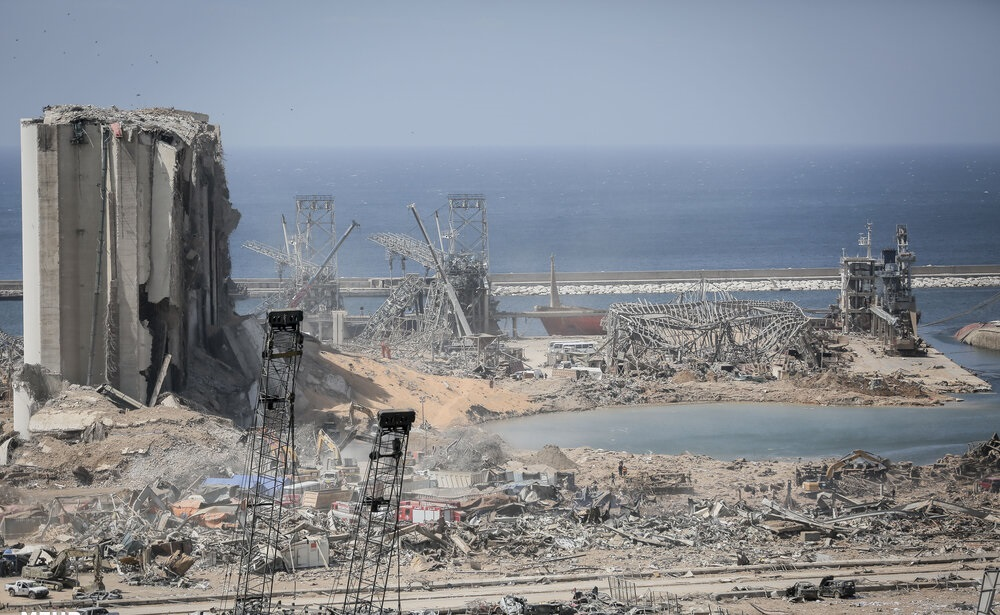
A flooded crater produced by the 2020 Beirut explosion. In a large explosion like this, the energy may not only cause destruction like that shown in the picture, but eject large amounts of material from the ground, creating a hole in the earth.

An explosion crater is a type of crater formed when material is ejected from the surface of the ground by an explosion at or immediately above or below the surface.

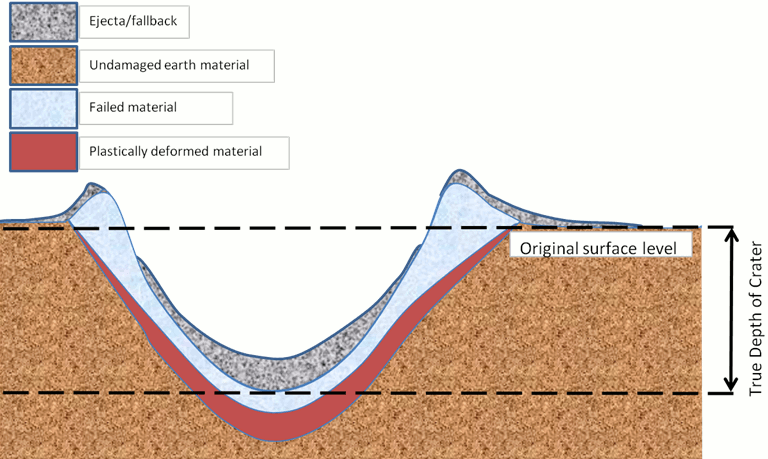
Stylised cross-section of a crater formed by a below-ground explosion.

A crater is formed by an explosion through the displacement and ejection of material from the ground. It is typically bowl-shaped. High-pressure gas and shock waves cause three processes responsible for the creation of the crater:

- Plastic deformation of the ground.
- Projection of material (ejecta) from the ground by the explosion.
- Spallation of the ground surface.

Two processes partially fill the crater back in:

- Fall-back of ejecta.
- Erosion and landslides of the crater lip and wall.

The relative importance of the five processes varies, depending on the height above or depth below the ground surface at which the explosion occurs and on the composition of the ground.

== Examples ==
One of the largest explosion craters in Germany is in the borough of Prüm. It was caused by a huge explosion in 1949, in which an ammunition depot exploded due to unknown causes and large parts of the town were destroyed.

== See also ==
- Hydrothermal explosion, caused by rapid heating of groundwater by volcanic sources
- Maar, a crater caused by a volcanic explosion
- Pseudocrater, a volcanic crater formed by a steam explosion
- Subsidence crater, a depression in the ground formed by collapse of a void below the surface
- Impact crater, a depression formed by excavation following a hypervelocity impact
- Volcanic crater
- Gas emission crater
