= Curt Bruns =

German war criminal (1915–1945)

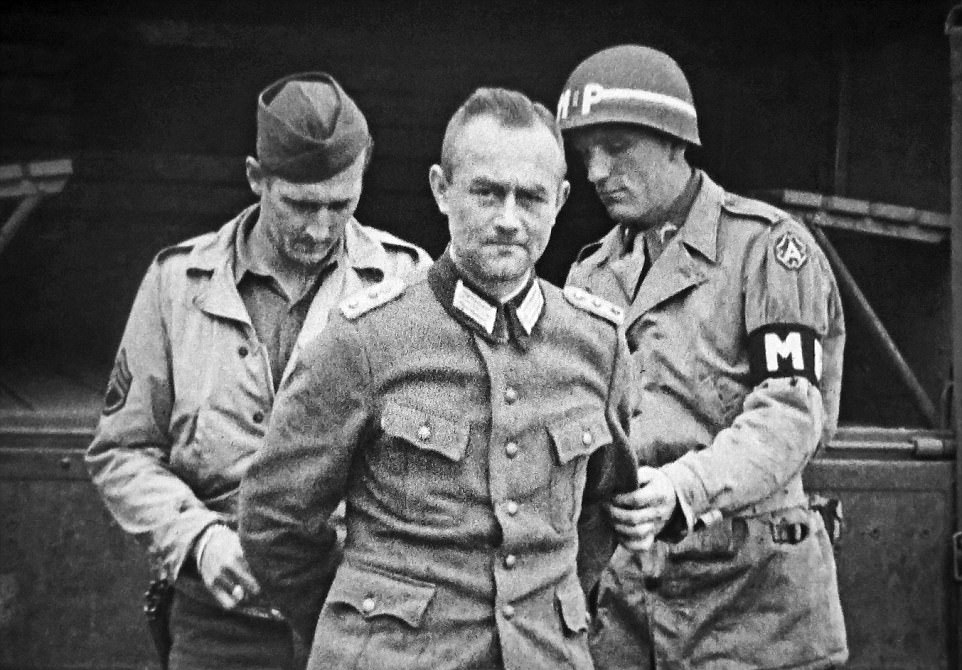
- Bruns being readied for his execution
- Born: March 12, 1915; Juist, Aurich, German Empire
- Died: June 15, 1945 (aged 30); Denstorf, Lower Saxony, Allied-occupied Germany
- Known for: Becoming the first German war criminal to be executed by the U.S. military
- Children: 1
- Status: Executed by firing squad
- Motive: Antisemitism
- Conviction: War crimes
- Penalty: Death

Details
- Victims: 2+
- Date: December 20, 1944
- Location: Bleialf (and possibly elsewhere)
- Date apprehended: February 7, 1945
- 'Military career'
- Allegiance: Nazi Germany
- Branch: Wehrmacht
- Service years: 1936–1945
- Rank: Hauptmann
- Commands: 2nd Battalion, 293rd Volks Grenadier Regiment, 18th Volksgrenadier Division
- Conflicts: World War II: Battle of the Bulge

Curt Bruns (March 12, 1915 – June 15, 1945) was a Wehrmacht captain and war criminal. During the Battle of the Bulge, he ordered the executions of two U.S. prisoners of war after learning that the two men were German-born Jews. When giving the order, he said, "The Jews have no right to live in Germany." Bruns was executed for the crime six months later, becoming the first German war criminal to be executed by the United States Army for war crimes after World War II.

== Early life and military service ==
Bruns was born in Juist, German Empire, in 1915. He was a grocery clerk in Stuttgart before joining the Wehrmacht in 1936. Bruns became an officer in 1939. He obtained the rank of Hauptmann in September 1943. He got married and had a child.

== War crimes ==
Between December 16, 1944, and December 20, 1944, during the Battle of the Bulge, U.S. soldiers captured about 30 Wehrmacht soldiers, including Corporal Heinrich Kauter, captured on December 16. During this time, Kauter and his fellow POWs were interrogated by two U.S. soldiers who spoke German fluently. On December 20, 1944, about 300 U.S. soldiers, including the two interrogators, were captured by the German 2nd Battalion, 293rd Volksgrenadier Regiment, 18th Volksgrenadier Division. The Germans were led by Curt Bruns, who was operating in Bleialf and Schoenberg. The American POWs were immediately marched to a customs house. Kauter went ahead of them. Bruns was in the street in front of the customs house when the POWs arrived.

Shortly after the POWs arrived, two of the recently freed German POWs informed Bruns that two of the American POWs spoke fluent German. These men were both Ritchie Boys assigned to 106th Infantry Division Interrogation of Prisoner of War (IPW) Team #154: Staff Sergeant Richard Jacobs and Technician 5th Grade Murray Zappler. Bruns immediately ordered the two soldiers to retrieve Jacobs and Zappler. They were lined up against the wall of the house by Sergeant Werner Hoffmann. Bruns had all of the other American POWs marched in the direction of Bleialf. Bruns asked Jacobs and Zappler if they had interrogated his men in German. After they said yes, Bruns then asked them several more questions. At some point, the men said they were German Jews.

Bruns then remarked, "Juden haben kein Recht, in Deutschland zu leben" ('Jews have no right to live in Germany.') He and Hoffmann had a brief conversation, after which Hoffmann immediately convened a firing squad composed of five or six non-commissioned officers, marched Jacobs and Zappler down the road, and had them shot.

== Arrest, trial, and execution ==
This crime was exposed by Corporal Heinrich Kauter, another soldier in Bruns's unit. Kauter was a Communist Party of Germany member who had been sent to a concentration camp, then conscripted near the end of war due to a lack of manpower. After being captured, Kauter said he wanted to report a war crime. He said he'd witnessed the murders of two American POWs who were shot after saying they were "Jews from Berlin." Officials put Captain Bruns on a wanted list for suspected war criminals. The next day, an investigator questioned Kauter about the incident.

- "How were they standing? With their hands in the air?"
  - "No, at attention with their backs to the firing squad."
- "Where were they shot?"
  - "Shot in the back."

Bruns was captured on February 7, 1945, and was identified shortly after. During questioning, he admitted to speaking with Jacobs and Zappler, but denied involvement in their deaths. He said he was told about their deaths, which had been carried out under the orders of his superior, a Lieutenant Colonel whose last name was Witte.

The interrogators did not believe Bruns. Witte was viewed as a convenient scapegoat since he had been killed in action. Officials placed Anton Korn, another conscripted German Communist, into a cell next to Bruns, hoping to obtain a confession. Korn was given a cover story that he was in custody under suspicion of murdering Belgian civilians.

On February 13, 1945, U.S. soldiers from the 12th Infantry Regiment found the bodies of Jacobs and Zappler in a small hole about 100 yards away from the road. Kauter had said the murders happened somewhere in the town of Bleialf. The two men were lying face up in an open shallow grave. Both of them were missing their boots. After Kauter, who had been recaptured, told U.S. officials what had happened, Bruns was listed as a suspected war criminal. After three weeks of searching, Bruns was arrested in a bunker at Schwarzer Mann. Although the war had not ended yet, Bruns was put on trial for war crimes for illegally executing Jacobs and Zappler. The early trial was permitted after Bruns was deemed a continuous threat to American military operations. Bruns's trial lasted one day. It was held on April 7, 1945, in the town of Düren. Bruns maintained his innocence. However, several witnesses, including Kauter, testified against Bruns. Kauter described what he saw and heard. Bruns told Korn that his battalion had once taken several hundred U.S. soldiers and 15 U.S. officers captive. Among them, he recalled, were two Jewish officers. Bruns said he had the officers separated from the rest and sent them back to the line of command, after which they were supposed "to lay them down." Bruns told Korn he had sworn a holy oath that, "Regardless of whether Germany will win this war or not, to devote my life to the destruction of Jews." Bruns said he was not afraid of witnesses since he was mentally superior to them. He also bragged about murdering some of his own men several days before his capture. They had said they wanted to surrender, after which Bruns said he gunned them down with a machine pistol.

Bruns continued to maintain his innocence and blame Witte for the executions. The case relied solely on witness testimony. Kauter and Korn testified against Bruns, as did 19-year-old Margarethe Meiters, a woman who knew Bruns and had lived at the customs house in Bleialf. Meiters said that as the U.S. prisoners were marching, she heard Bruns yell, "If they don't hold their hands up, I'll shoot them." Later that day, Bruns's adjutant, a Lieutenant named Oppermann, talked to Meiters:

Today we have captured a large number of Americans again. In Germany, there isn't room for captured Negroes or Jews. Today we shot two Jews. Didn't you hear it or see it? They were shot because the captured German prisoners identified them as two who had questioned them. The lieutenant then pointed where the executions took place.

Bruns rejected the testimony. He and the officer appointed to defend him attempted to cast doubt on the testimony. They were unsuccessful. Bruns was found guilty and sentenced to death by firing squad. The case was reviewed on April 20. Colonel Brannon, the Staff Judge Advocate at Headquarters First Army, determined that the case against Bruns was mostly circumstantial. There were several inconsistencies in the testimony, and not once did any of the witnesses say they heard Bruns actually give the order to have Jacobs and Zappler executed. Ultimately, Brannon recommended that the guilty verdict be upheld.

With the exception of his denial on the stand that he actually heard the accused order Sgt Hoffmann to have the prisoners shot, Kauter has been entirely consistent during each of the many pre-trial examinations to which he was subjected. The history of the case discloses that he was captured and had given his statement before the bodies were recovered or Capt Bruns was apprehended. In fact, it was the testimony of Kauter which instigated the search for the accused. The accused corroborated the testimony of Kauter in every substantial particular except in his denial of responsibility and in his statement of where the execution occurred.

Bruns was shot at a gravel quarry in Denstorf on June 15, 1945. He was the first Axis war criminal to be executed by the U.S. military.
