= Ferdinand Ferber =

Louis Ferdinand Ferber
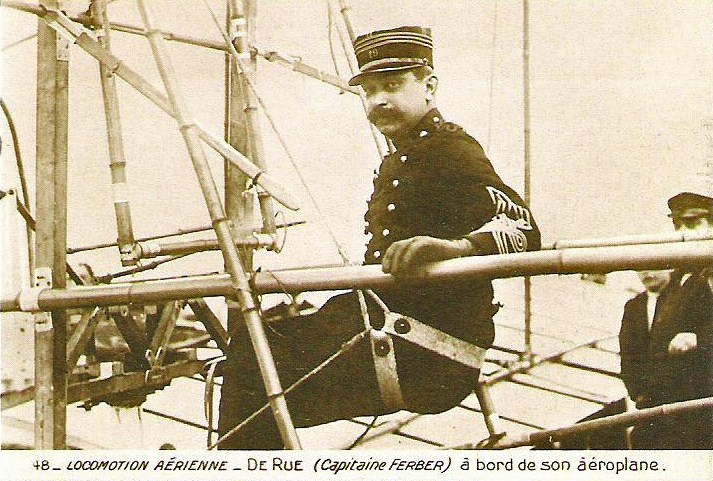
- Born: 8 February 1862
- Died: 22 September 1909 (aged 47); Boulogne, France
- Military career
- Allegiance: France
- Branch: French Army
- Rank: Captain
- Awards: Chevalier of the Legion of Honour

Louis Ferdinand Ferber (8 February 1862 – 22 September 1909) was a French Army officer who played an important role in the development of aviation during the early 1900s. Although his aircraft experiments were belatedly successful, his early recognition and publicizing of the work of the Wright Brothers was a major influence on the development of aviation in Europe.

== Early life ==
Born in Lyon in 1862, he studied at the Ecole Polytechnique before joining the Army, eventually becoming an instructor the School of Applied Artillery at Fontainbleau in 1897. It was here that he came across the work of Otto Lilienthal, through reading about his work in an article in the Illustrierte Zeitung.

== Aviation experiments ==
=== Early attempts ===
After some experimentation with models Ferber constructed his first full-size unmanned glider, which had a lozenge-shaped wing about 8 m (26 ft) across, and unsuccessfully attempted to fly it from a launching tower at his family's estate in Rue in Switzerland in August 1898. He then constructed a similar but smaller second machine, which he attempted to fly both as a kite and by towing it behind a horse, also without much success.

In early 1901 Ferber was transferred from Fontainbleu to Nice, where he was placed in command of the 17th Alpine Battery of the 19th Regiment. Here he continued his experiments: his third attempt was more closely modelled on the pattern of Lillienthal's gliders, and was Ferber's first attempt at building a man-carrying glider. Trials were made at Saint-Etienne-de-Tinée, but the wing area proved insufficient for the purpose, and so a fourth, larger, glider was constructed.

=== Contact with Chanute ===
In 1901 Ferber became aware of the aeronautical experiments of Octave Chanute, a French-born American civil engineer, as a result of reading an article in the Revue Scientifique published in the issue dated 1 June 1901. Ferber wrote to Chanute, and through him learnt of the experiments of the Wright Brothers, receiving a copy of Wilbur Wright's paper "Some Aeronautical Experiments" which had been published in the Journal of the Western Society of Engineers in December 1901. Ferber then built his fifth aircraft, based on photographs of the Wright's 1901 glider.

This resembled the Wright glider in being a two-bay biplane with a forward elevator, but the resemblance ends there. As with Ferber's previous aircraft, the construction was crude in the extreme, the wings consisting merely of a simple framework of bamboo loosely covered with fabric, entirely lacking the ribs which formed the wings of the Wright's glider into a lift-giving aerofoil section. Moreover, there was no attempt at lateral control. The connection between lateral and directional control was the key discovery of the Wright Brothers, and although their 1901 glider lacked a rudder the use of wing warping was clearly described in the paper by Wilbur Wright. Ferber's experiments with this aircraft were encouraging, and an account of his work written by Ferber under his pseudonym "de Rue" was published in the February 1903 issue of l'Aérophile.

Ferber did not attend Chanute's lecture to the Aero Club de France in April 1903, but after hearing of it he wrote to Ernest Archdeacon, one of the founder members of the Aero Club. His letter asked Archdeacon to use his influence to get the Aero Club to announce a prize for a glider flight, and contained the exhortation il ne faut pas laisser l'aéroplane s'achever en Amérique ("The aeroplane must not be allowed to reach successful achievement in America"). His suggestion was enthusiastically endorsed by Archdeacon, who included an extract from Ferber's letter in his account of Chanute's lecture published in La Locomotion on 11 April: the letter was also published in the April issue of L'Aerophile.

=== Ferber experiments ===
Ferber then built another aircraft very similar to his 1902 glider. This differed principally in having a pair of triangular rudders mounted on the aft outboard interplane struts. This aircraft was then fitted with a 6 hp (4 kW) Buchet engine, driving a pair of coaxially mounted propellers, in which form it was called the Type V-bis. Between September 1903 and October 1904 a number of attempts at flight were made, and he also constructed a tall latticework tower supporting a long counterbalanced revolving arm from which the aircraft was suspended. Ferber wrote that trials of this machine "were completely useless, but drew public attention to aviation".

In April 1904 Ferber assisted Ernest Archdeacon with the trials of his Wright-derived glider at Berck-sur-Mer. Shortly after this Charles Renard, commander of the French Army balloon school at Chalais-Meudon, invited Ferber to join this establishment, and he took up this new post in early May 1904. He also constructed another aircraft, the Type VI, notable for its use of a rear-mounted horizontal stabiliser and also featuring dihedral in an attempt to obtain lateral stability.

In June 1905 Ferber wrote to the Wright Brothers offering to buy one of their machines. The Wrights were unwilling to do this but their reply, dated 9 October 1905, detailed the flights they had recently made, and so Ferber was the first European to learn of these achievements.

After the death of Renard in April 1905, Ferber's relationship with the authorities at Chalais-Meudon deteriorated. In June 1906 he asked for three years' leave in order to work at the Antoinette company. This was granted in August 1906, and he was also allowed to continue his experiments at Chalais-Meudon. In 1906 Ferber built his aeroplane type VIII, fitted with a 24 hp Antoinette engine. When parked outside of hangar, this aircraft was destroyed by a storm in November. Rebuilt as type IX, it was belatedly but successfully tested in July 1908 at Issy-les-Moulineaux near Paris.

In 1908, Ferber founded the Ligue Nationale Aérienne with the help of the well-known physiologist René Quinton. Quinton was a member of a Parisian group of literary personalities called the "Forty-five," who honored achievements in literature, sciences and arts. In May 1908 Ferber addressed the group at Quinton's suggestion and after receiving a standing ovation for his accomplishments in aviation, Quinton was inspired to establish a 10,000 francs prize for the first person to fly for 5 minutes with engine stopped and without losing more than 50 metres altitude. In May 1909 the Ligue opened a flying school Port-Aviation (often called "Juvisy Airfield") at Viry-Châtillon with Ferber as its chief instructor.

=== Death ===
Captain Ferber was killed on 22 September 1909 at a flying meeting in Boulogne when he attempted a turn at low altitude in a Voisin biplane and one wing struck the ground. He was only the third victim of an aeroplane accident after Thomas Selfridge and Eugène Lefebvre.

He was buried at the Cemetery of Loyasse in Lyon.

In June 1910, the French Minister of War announced that one of their newly ordered Zodiac dirigibles was to be named Capitaine Ferber, and a memorial in the form of monolith bearing a bronze flying eagle was erected at Boulogne.

Gaston Combebiac wrote that Ferber ought to be considered a member of the Quaternion Association when he contributed a biographical note to the Association's Bulletin:

After all, since his intuition, at once mathematical and realistic, having not failed to recognize the advantages presented by the use of vector calculus for certain physical applications of mathematics, we must rank him among the members of our Association.

== Aircraft ==
- Ferber I (1899) Monoplane hang-glider modelled on Otto Lilienthal's designs.
- Ferber II
- Ferber III
- Ferber IV (1901) Monoplane hang-glider modelled on Otto Lilienthal's designs.
- Ferber V (1902) Two-bay biplane glider with forward elevator, later fitted with triangular rudders on the outer interplane struts, and then rebuilt with a 6 hp Buchet engine and renamed the V-bis.
- Ferber VI (1904) two bay biplane glider, with an elongated rear-mounted horizontal stabiliser in addition to a forward elevator.
- Ferber VII
- Ferber VIII
- Ferber IX

== Quotes ==
"L'ascension est une fleur qui naît de la vitesse". Translation : "The lift is a flower born from velocity".
"Concevoir une machine volante n'est rien; Fabriquer est peu; L'essayer est tout", Translation : ""To design a flying machine is nothing; To build one is something; To experiment is everything". In his memoir, The Story of the Winged-S, Igor Sikorsky renders the quote "To invent a flying machine is nothing; to build it is little; to make it fly is everything."

== Books ==
- 1904 : F. Ferber : Les progrès de l'aviation par le vol plané, F.Ferber, in Revue d'Artillerie, mars 1904
- 1908: F. Ferber : L'Aviation — ses Débuts — son Développement, link from Internet Archive.
