= Bitburg Reservoir =

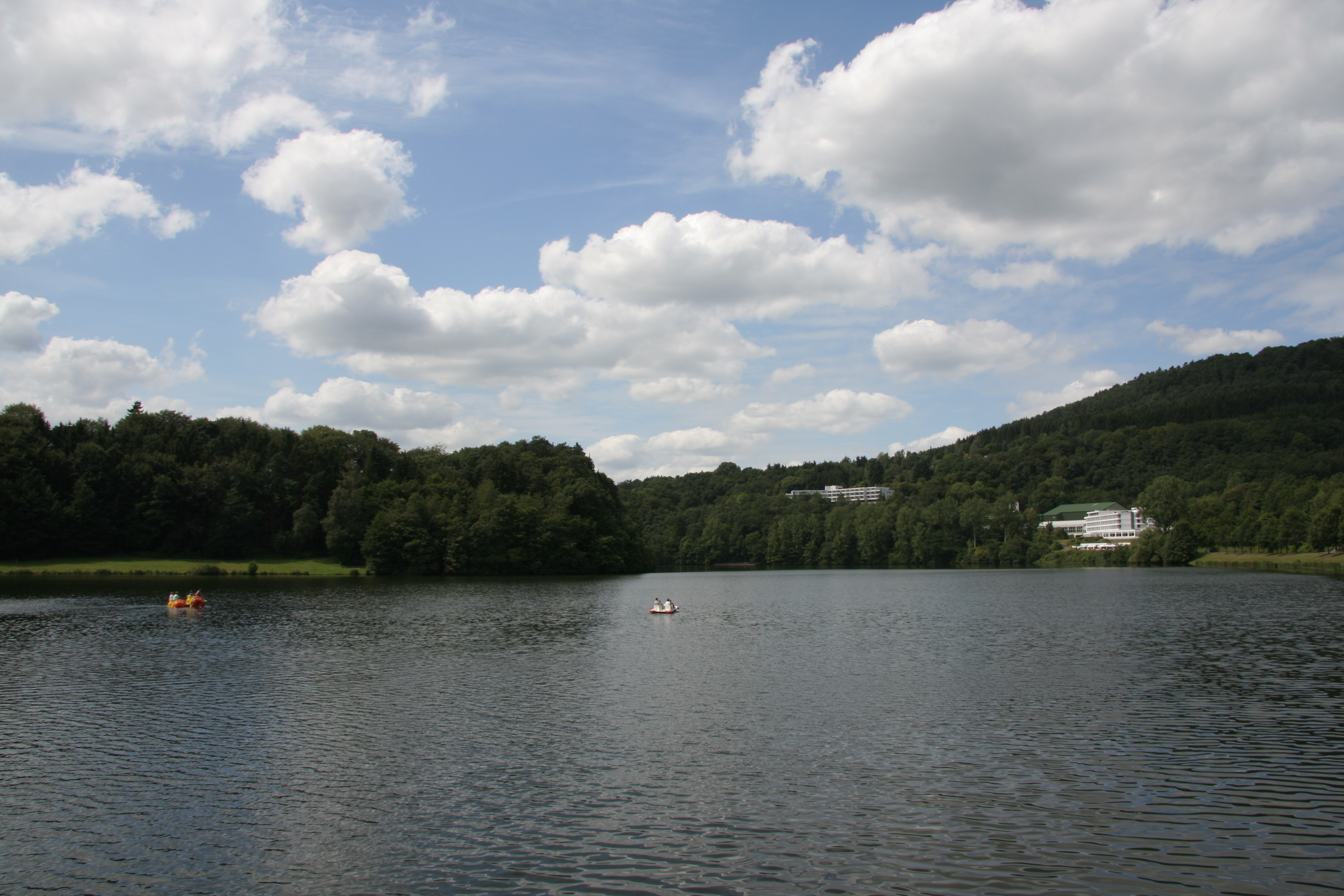
- Interactive map of Bitburg Reservoir
- Location: Bitburg-Prüm
- Coordinates: 50.017°N 6.438°E
- Construction began: 1970–1972

Dam and spillways
- Impounds: Prüm
- Height (foundation): 18 m
- Length: 90 m (300 ft)
- Elevation at crest: 260 m
- Width (crest): 10 m

Reservoir
- Total capacity: 2.4 Mm^{3}
- Active capacity: 1.2 Mm^{3}
- Catchment area: 330 km^{2}
- Surface area: 0.393 km^{2}
- Normal elevation: 256 m

The Bitburg Reservoir (German: Stausee Bitburg) is a flood retention basin on the River Prüm in Biersdorf am See and Wiersdorf in the Eifel mountains of Germany. It is about 12 kilometres northwest of the town of Bitburg and not far from the city of Trier in the state of Rhineland-Palatinate.

The dam, a 15-metre-high earth dam, was built by the Zweckverband Stausee Bitburg for flood protection at a spot where the narrow and deeply incised valley of the Prüm opened into a valley bowl, that used to be constantly in danger of flooding. The roughly 2-kilometre-long and up to nine-metre-deep reservoir allows the regulation of low water levels, enables the generation of electricity, and offers a place of recreation, making it a popular destination and tourist centre in the South Eifel. Around the lake there is a five-kilometre-long circular path and many other good hiking trails, some of which are lit at night. The hiking network of the German-Luxembourg Nature Park starts here.

Sporting and recreational activities include rowing, paddling, surfing, pedaloes, inline skating, mountain biking, badminton, cycling and fishing (for trout). in the middle of the lake is a large fountain.

== See also ==
- List of dams in Germany

== Gallery ==
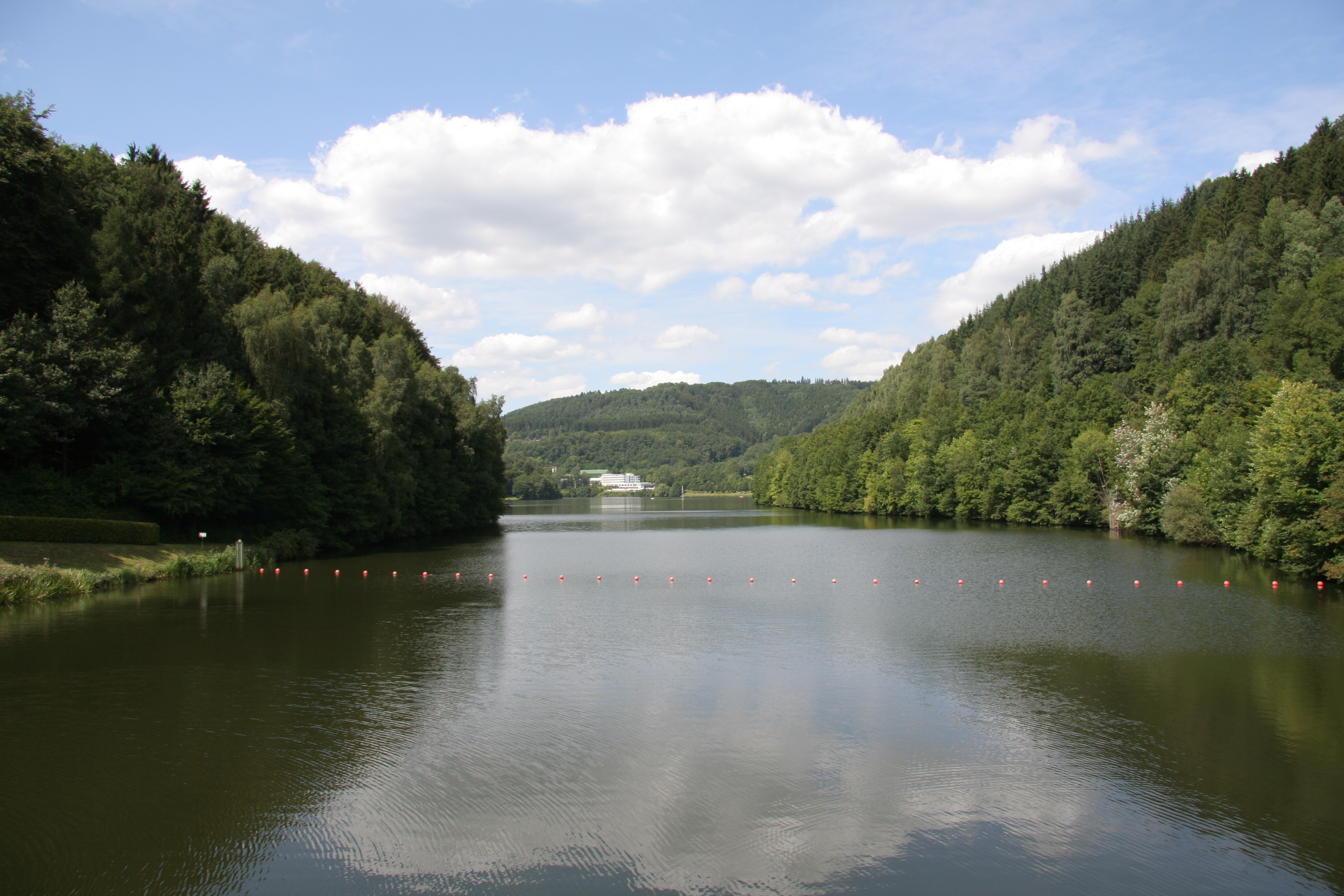
View of the dam from the lake

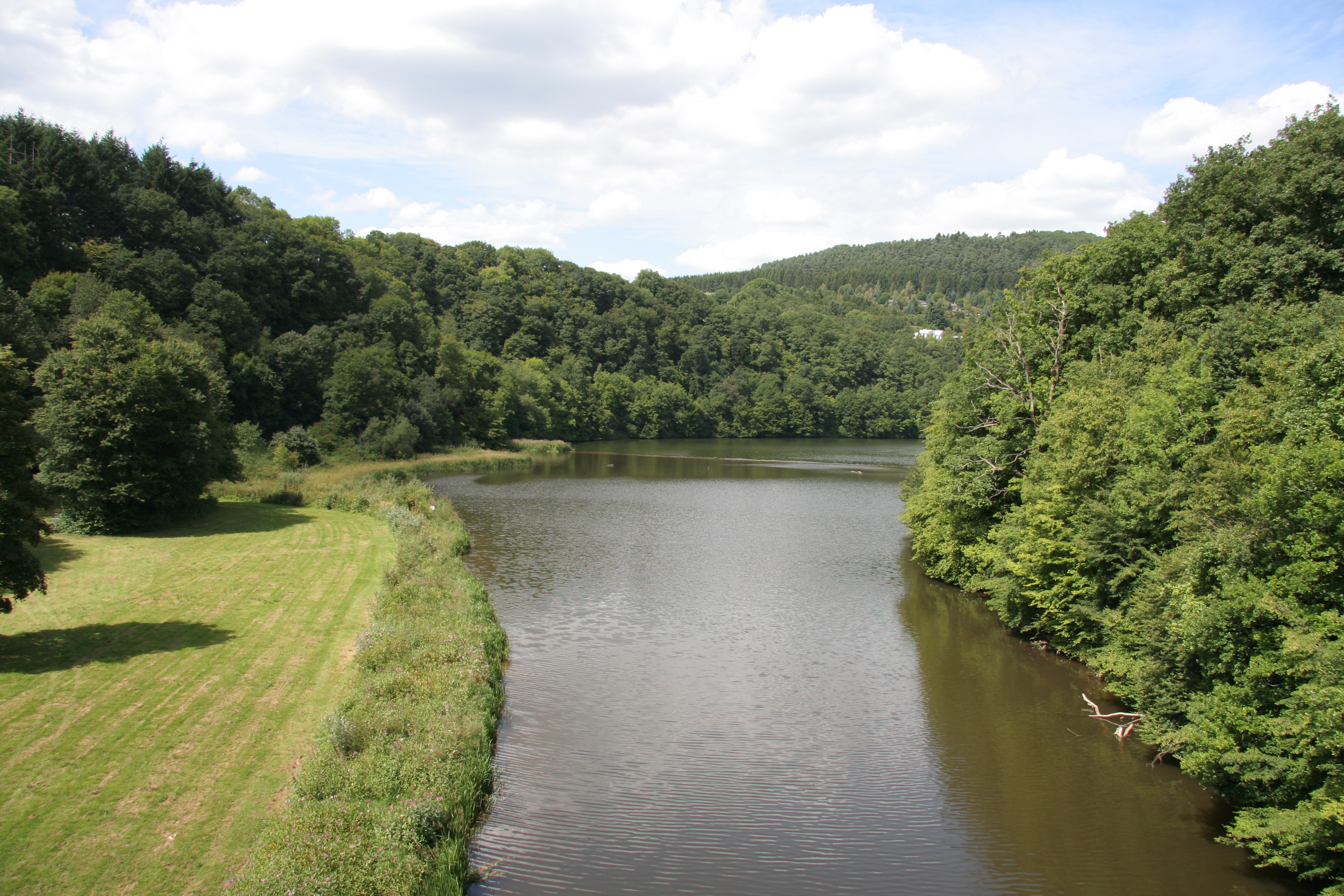
Inflow of the Prüm

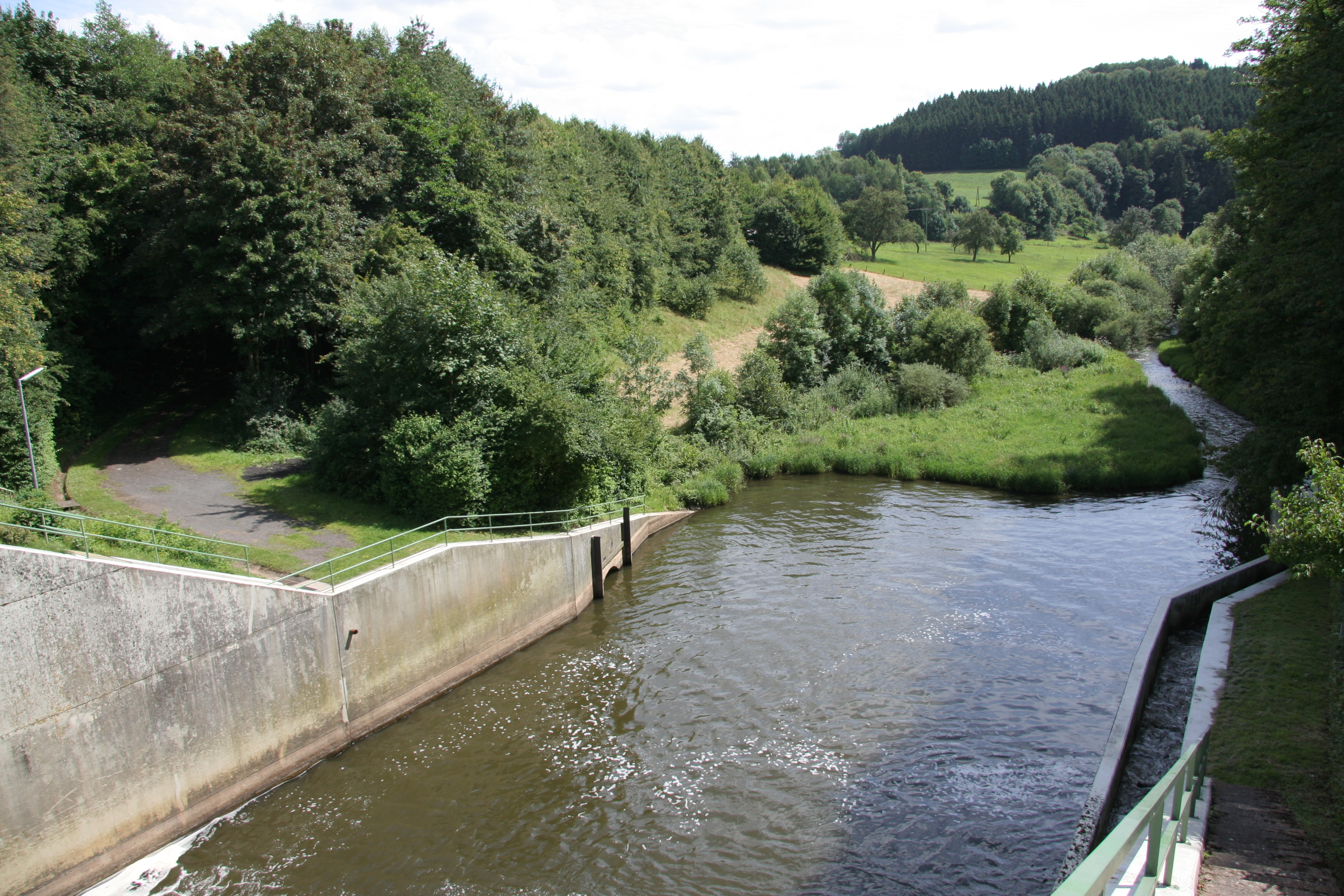
Outflow of the Prüm

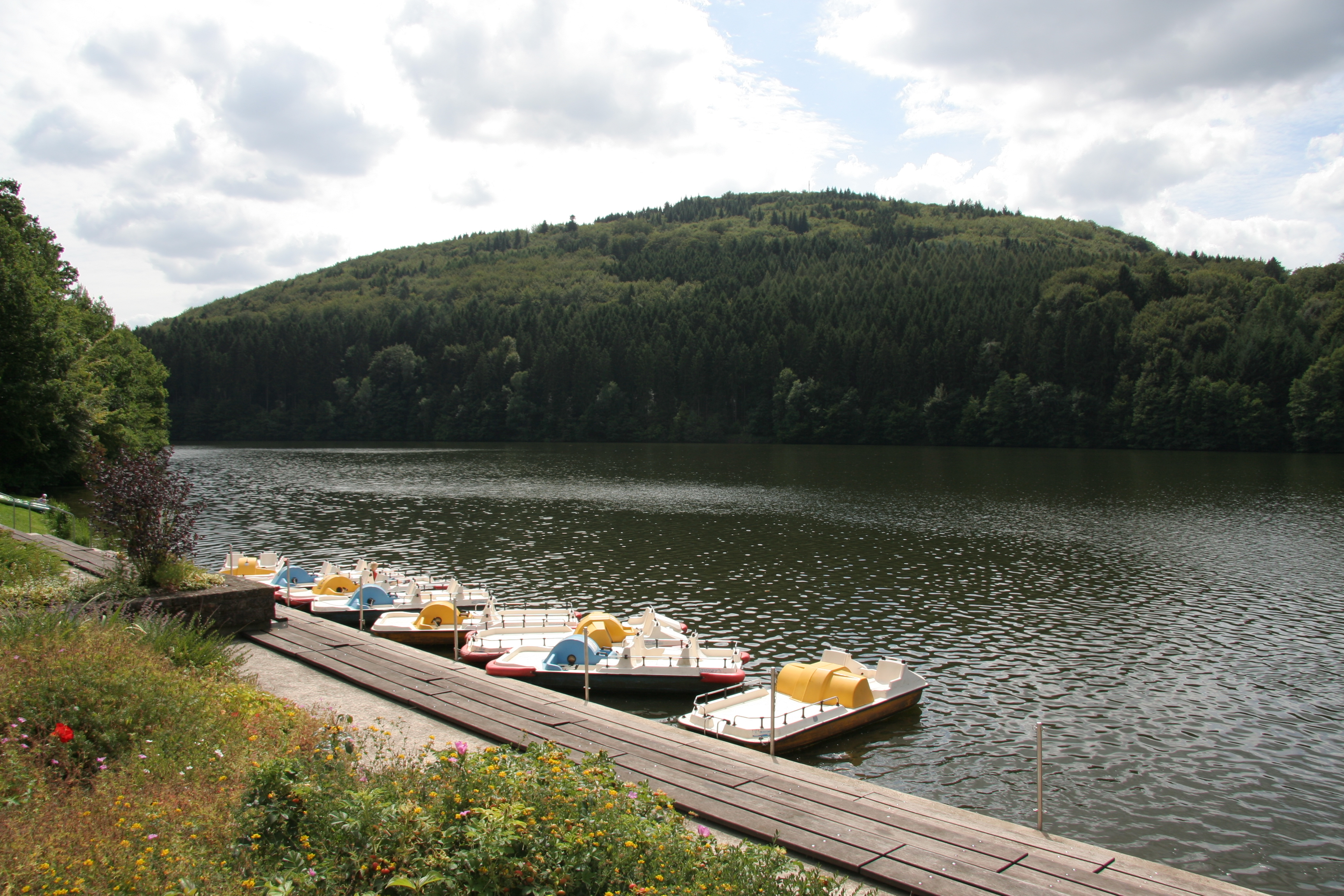
Boat hire

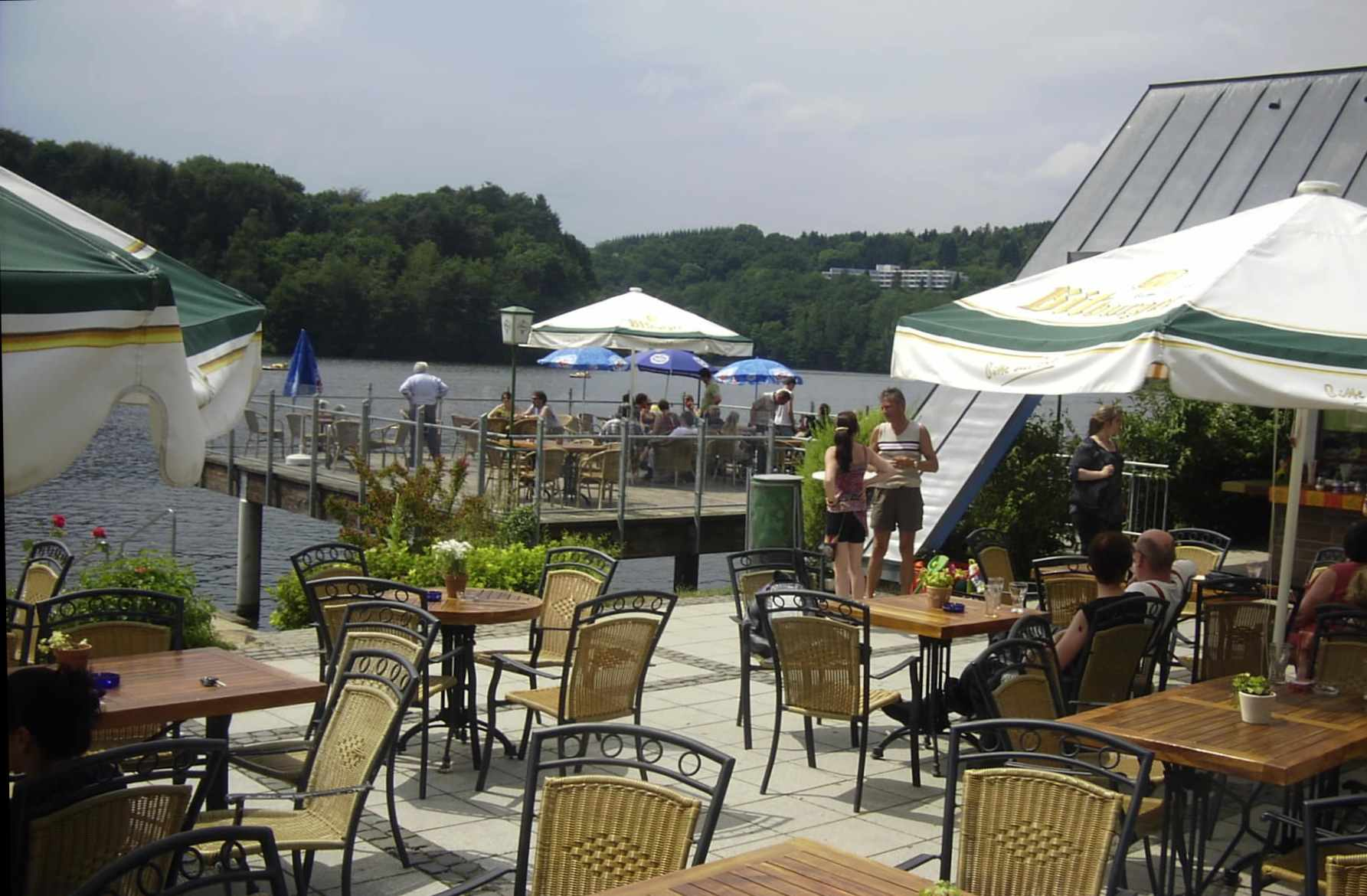
Gastronomy by the lakeshore near Biersdorf

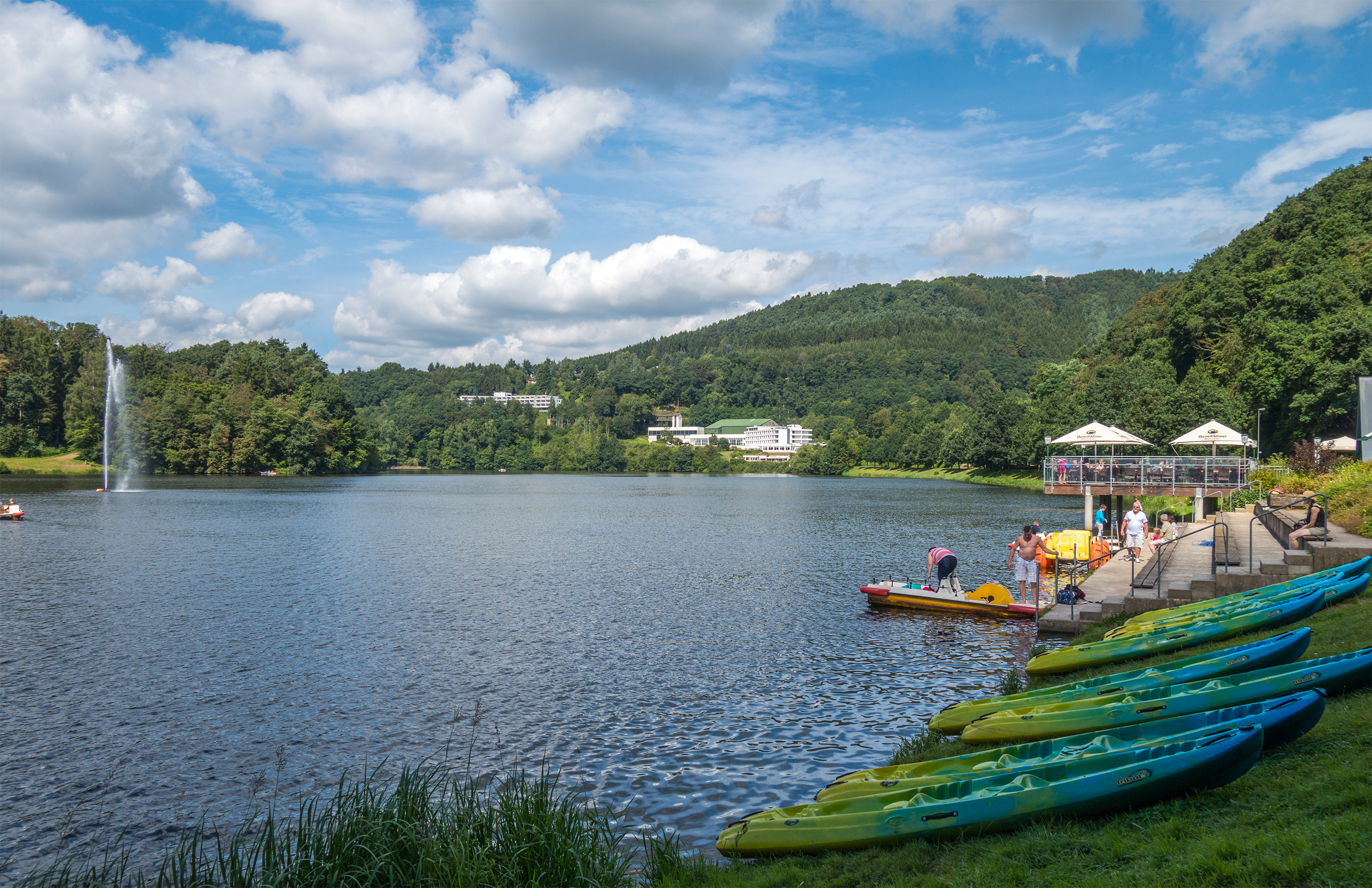
View of the hotels on the northern shore
