= Ernest Archdeacon =

French aviation pioneer

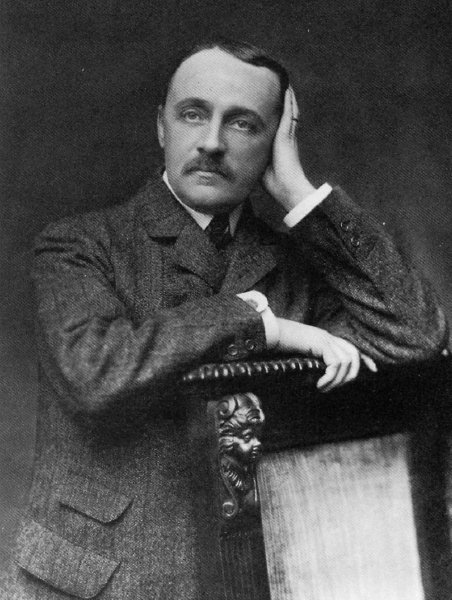
- Archdeacon in the 1890s
- Born: 23 March 1863; Paris, France
- Died: 3 January 1950 (aged 86); Versailles, France
- Occupation: Lawyer
- Organization: Aéro-Club de France
- Known for: Aviation pioneering

Signature
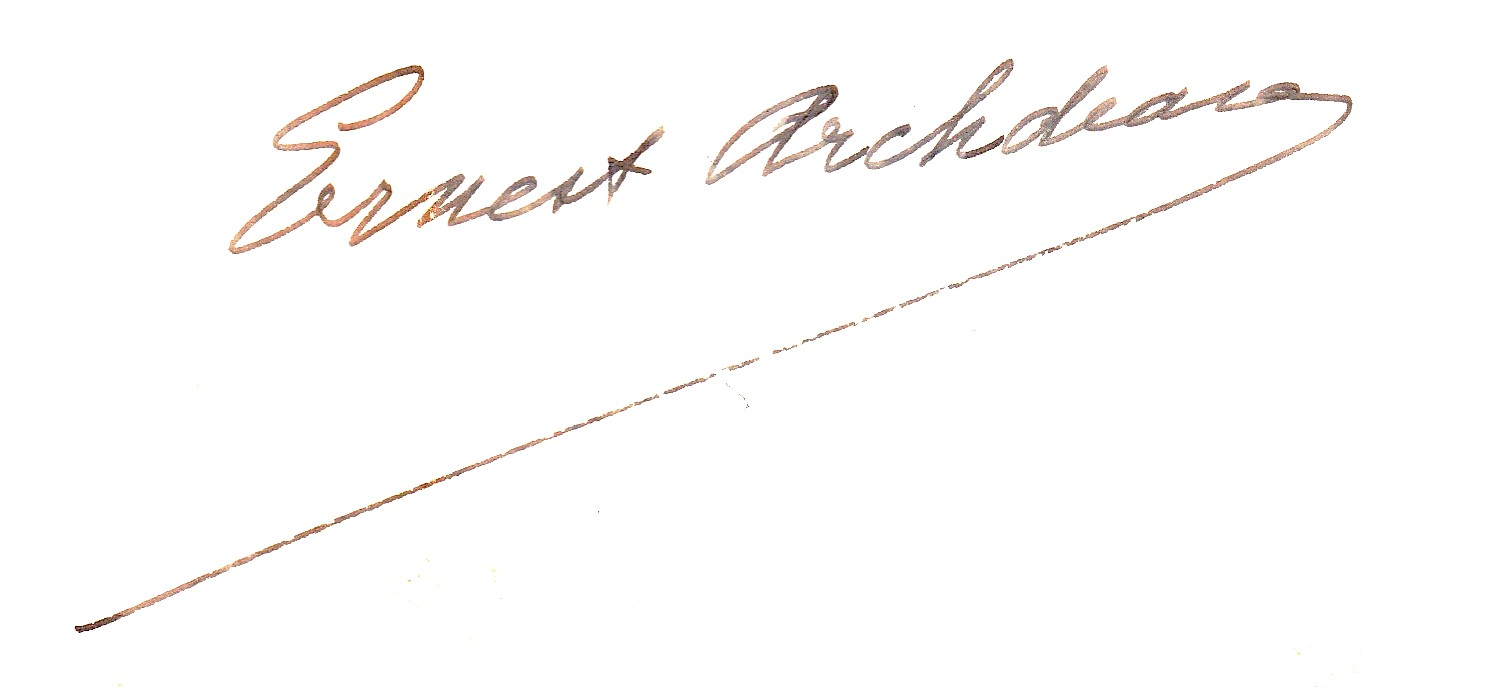

Ernest Archdeacon (23 March 1863 – 3 January 1950) was a French lawyer and aviation pioneer before the First World War. He made his first balloon flight at the age of 20. He commissioned a copy of the 1902 Wright No. 3 glider but had only limited success. He was regarded as France's foremost promoter and sponsor of aviation, offering prizes (Coupe d'Aviation Ernest Archdeacon and the Deutsch de la Meurthe-Archdeacon prize), commissioning designs, and organising tests and events.

His most lasting contribution to aviation is the Aéro-Club de France, the oldest aero-club in the world, which he co-founded in 1898. On 29 May 1908, Archdeacon became the first aeroplane passenger in Europe when he was piloted by Henry Farman at Ghent.

== Early life ==
Archdeacon was born and raised in Paris, and studied law for a career at the bar. His passionate interest in science led him to also study ballooning and aviation, and in 1884, at age 20, he made his first balloon flight.

== Motoring ==
Archdeacon was a keen sporting motorist, taking part in many of the main events of the period.

In 1894 he finished 17th in the world's first motor race, driving his Serpollet steamer from Paris to Rouen, covering the distance of 127 km (79 mi) in 13 hours.

In 1896 he finished 7th in the Paris-Marseilles-Paris Trail driving a Delahaye. Covering the 1710 km in 75 hours 29 minutes 48 seconds. The event had 14 finishers from around 32 starters.

In 1897 he finished 21st in the Paris-Dieppe Trail on 24 July driving a Delahaye. Covering the 170.8 km in 5 hours 41 minutes 15 seconds at an average speed of 30 kilometres per hour. The event had 43 finishers from over 45 starters.

In 1899 he finished 8th in the Nice-Castellane-Nice race on 21 March driving a Delahaye, covering the 120.7 km in 3 hours 40 minutes.

== The Aero Club of France ==
On 20 October 1898, in partnership with the oil magnate Henri Deutsch de la Meurthe. Archdeacon founded the Aéro-Club de France, which is still the official authority of the organization of sports aviation in France. Other founding members included the Marquis de Fonvielle, Count Henri de la Vaulx and Count Henri de la Valette. The first president of the Aero Club in 1900 was the Marquis Jules-Albert de Dion.

== Sponsor of aviation ==
In April 1900, the Aéro-Club de France announced the 'Deutsch de la Meurthe' prize of one hundred thousand francs for the first flying machine to complete the round trip from Saint-Cloud to the Eiffel Tower and back in less than thirty minutes. On 19 October 1901 Alberto Santos-Dumont won the prize in his airship No 6.

After learning about the Wright brothers glider flights from Octave Chanute's lecture to the Aero Club de France on 2 April 1903, Archdeacon decided to further encourage the development of aviation in France. He was encouraged to do this by the pioneer French aviator Captain Ferber, who had written to Archdeacon demanding "Do not let the aeroplane be achieved in America first." Archdeacon donated 3000 francs to the "Archdeacon committee!" of the Aéro-Club de France to sponsor aviation competitions.

=== Gliders ===
In 1903, Archdeacon commissioned an imperfect copy of the 1902 Wright glider from Monsieur Dargent at the military balloons and airships workshop at Chalais-Meudon. It was a biplane with an ash framework covered with silk and braced with piano wire, and lacked the provision for lateral control that was the key to the success of the Wright Brothers' aircraft. It was described in La Vie au Grand Air:

"The two wings, slightly convex from front to back, have a wingspan of 7.5 m (25 ft), a width of 1.4 m (4.6 ft) and are separated vertically by 0.4 m (1.3 ft). Total area: 22 square meters. ...It has two rudders: the horizontal rudder at the front for the vertical direction and preparing landing by gradually decreasing the speed; and the vertical rudder at the back for getting the direction in the horizontal plane (steering). The aéroplane is very robust despite weighing only 34 kilograms.

The first experiments with this glider were conducted in April 1904 on the dunes at Merlimont near Berck-sur-Mer, piloted by Gabriel Voisin and Captain Ferber.

In March 1905, he commissioned a second glider from Voisin. In its unmanned first test, towed by a car, it broke apart in the air.

A third glider, the Voisin-Archdeacon floatplane glider, was then commissioned from Voisin. This aircraft marked the introduction to European aviation of the Hargrave cell, based on Lawrence Hargrave's box-kites: it was a three-bay biplane with side-curtains between the wings, a double-cell biplane tail and a forward elevator, and was fitted with a pair of floats. It was successfully tested on the River Seine at Boulogne-Billancourt using a boat to tow it between the bridges of Saint-Cloud and Sèvres. It rose to about 18 m (59 ft) above the Seine and flew about 610 m (2,000 ft), but was damaged in its next test and never flew again, although further attempts were made on Lake Geneva in September.

=== Heavier-than-air powered flight ===
In 1903 Ernest Archdeacon and the Aéro-Club de France announced the Coupe d'Aviation Ernest Archdeacon, a silver trophy for the first flight of more than 25 metres by a 'heavier-than-air' craft. Later, the Aéro-Club de France offered a prize of 1500 francs to the first person to fly 100 m (330 ft).

In October 1904, Ernest Archdeacon joined Deutsch de la Meurthe to offer a prize of 50,000 francs for the first heavier-than-air flight around a one kilometre closed circuit. The sum represented about 20 times the annual earnings of a Parisian professional worker. Archdeacon and de la Meurthe understood that apart from the Wrights (see below), all heavier-than-air flights had been in a straight line. The prize was intended to encourage the development of an airplane that could turn, so the prize winner would have to fly a closed circuit.

The 25 metre prize was won by Alberto Santos-Dumont on 23 October 1906 at Bagatelle. He went on to win the 100 metre prize on 12 November 1906. The 1 kilometre prize was won by Henri Farman on 13 January 1908, at Issy-les-Moulineaux.

== Archdeacon Aéromotocyclette Anzani ==
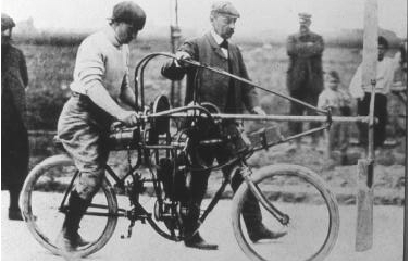
Archdeacon's 'Aéro-Moto-Cyclette', September 1906

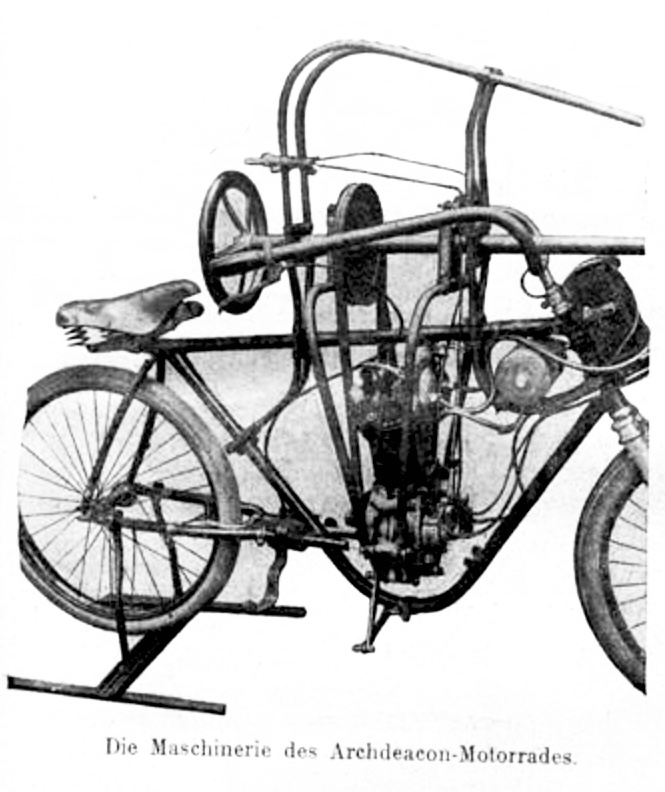
Aéromotocyclette Anzani (1906)

In 1906 Archdeacon commissioned a propeller-driven motorcycle, the Aéromotocyclette Anzani, which achieved a timed speed of 79.5 kilometres per hour at Achères-la-Forêt. This aéromotocyclette, based on a 'Buchet' motorcycle, was equipped with a 6-horsepower Anzani engine driving a propeller mounted on a 1.5 m (4.9 ft) steel tube. There is no evidence that he applied for a patent.

== Scepticism toward the Wright brothers ==
In November 1905 the Wright Brothers had written a letter to George Besançon, the editor of l'Aérophile describing their recent achievements in detail. The letter was published in the Paris sporting daily newspaper l'Auto on 30 November 1905, since Besançon was not able to publish it himself without delay.

This news polarized members of the Aero Club de France. A minority, including Besançon, Ferber and Henry Kapférer, believed the claims of the Wright Brothers, but the majority, led by Archdeacon, thought that they were false.

In 1906 the anti-Wright brothers sceptics in the European aviation community had converted the press. European newspapers, especially in France, were openly derisive, calling them bluffeurs (bluffers). Archdeacon was publicly sceptical of the brothers' claims in spite of published reports; he wrote several articles and stated that "the French would make the first public demonstration of powered flight".

On 10 February 1906 the Paris edition of the New York Herald summed up Europe's opinion of the Wright brothers in an editorial: "The Wrights have flown or they have not flown. They possess a machine or they do not possess one. They are in fact either fliers or liars. It is difficult to fly. It's easy to say, 'We have flown.'"

In August 1908, after Wilbur Wright's demonstrations at Les Hunaudières race course near Le Mans, Archdeacon publicly admitted that he had done them an injustice.

== Aeroplane passenger ==
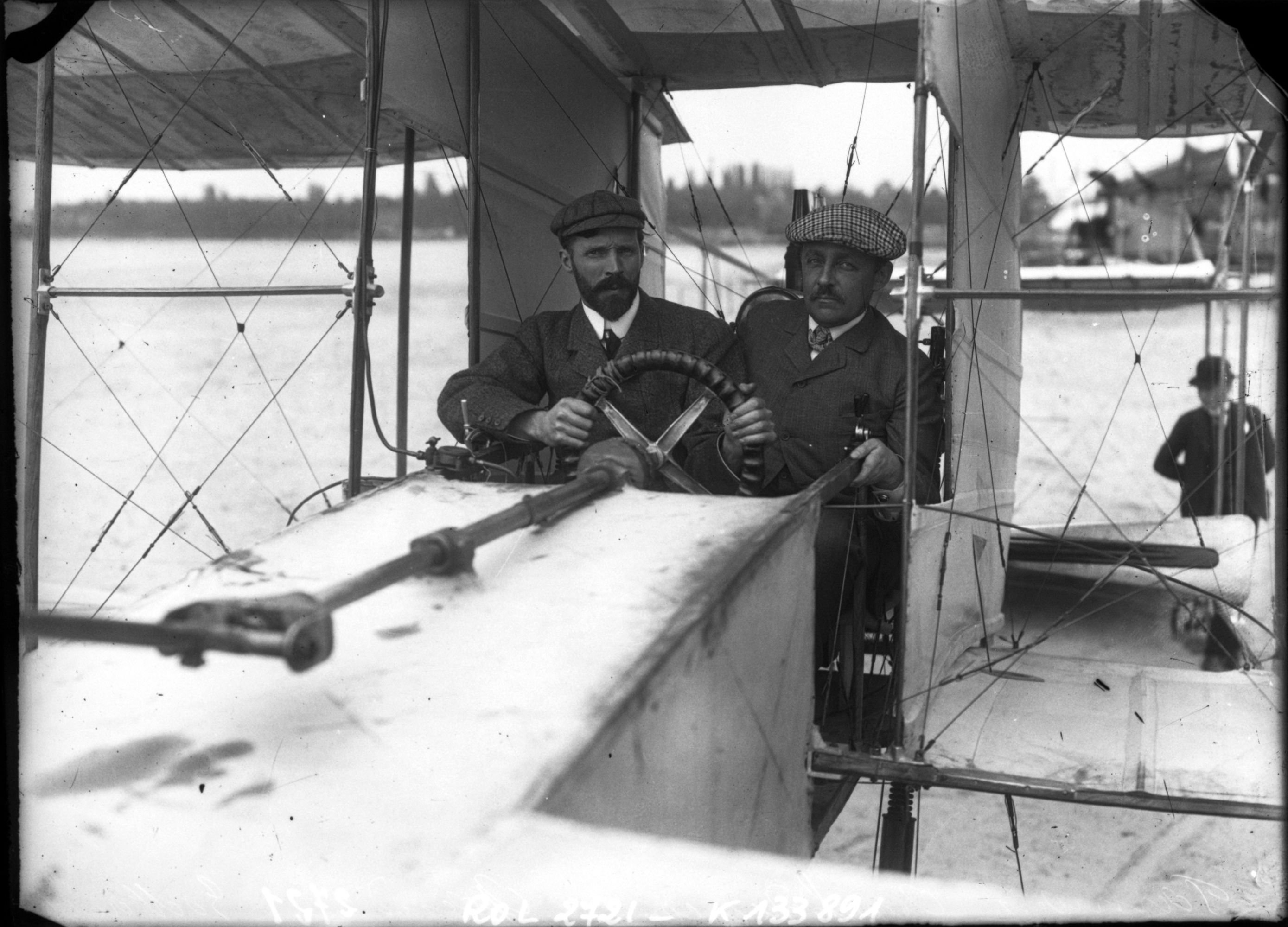
Archdeacon in Farman's Voisin Biplane in May 1908

Ernest Archdeacon is widely cited as the first aeroplane passenger in Europe when he was piloted by Henry Farman at Ghent on 29 May 1908. The total flight was 1,241 m (4,072 ft). Charles E. Vivian says he was preceded on 29 March by Leon Delagrange, who was also flown by Farman.

== Esperanto ==
Archdeacon also spoke Esperanto, which he learned in 1908. He wrote "Why I became an Esperanto speaker" (Pourquoi je suis devenu espérantiste, Paris: Fayard, 1910, 265 p.), prefaced by Henri Farman. He was elected president of the Société Française pour la Propagation de l'Espéranto in 1925, and advocated that international language until the end of his life.

== See also ==
- Aviation history
- List of firsts in aviation
- Timeline of aviation - 19th century
- Timeline of aviation - 20th century
