= Prüm explosion =

1949 Explosion in West Germany

Coordinates: 50°12′37″N 6°24′35″E

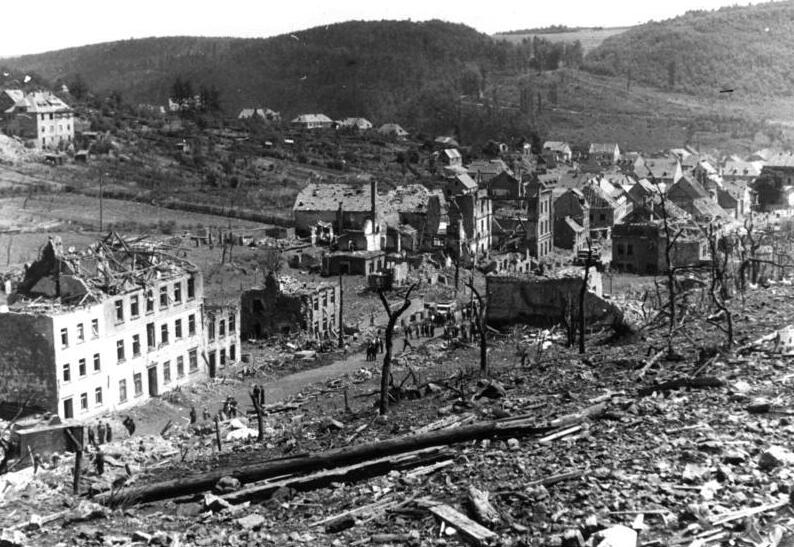
The devastation in Prüm after the explosion in 1949

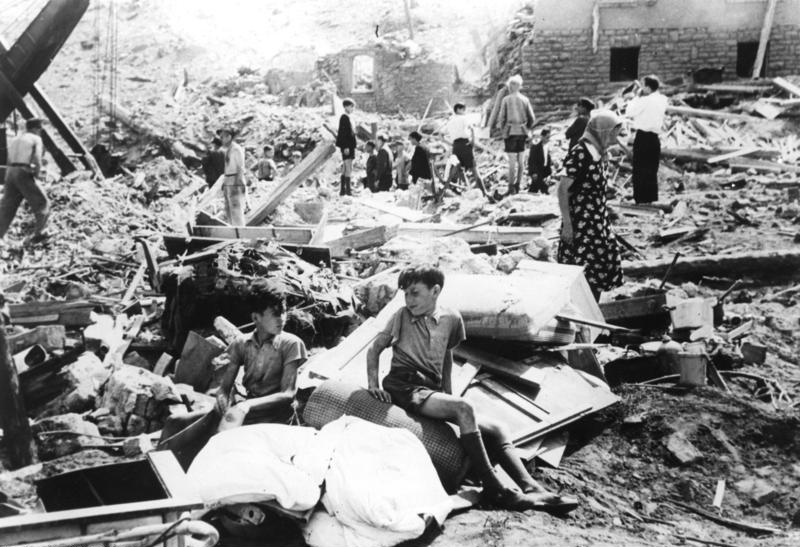
The people of Prüm searching for their belongings in the rubble

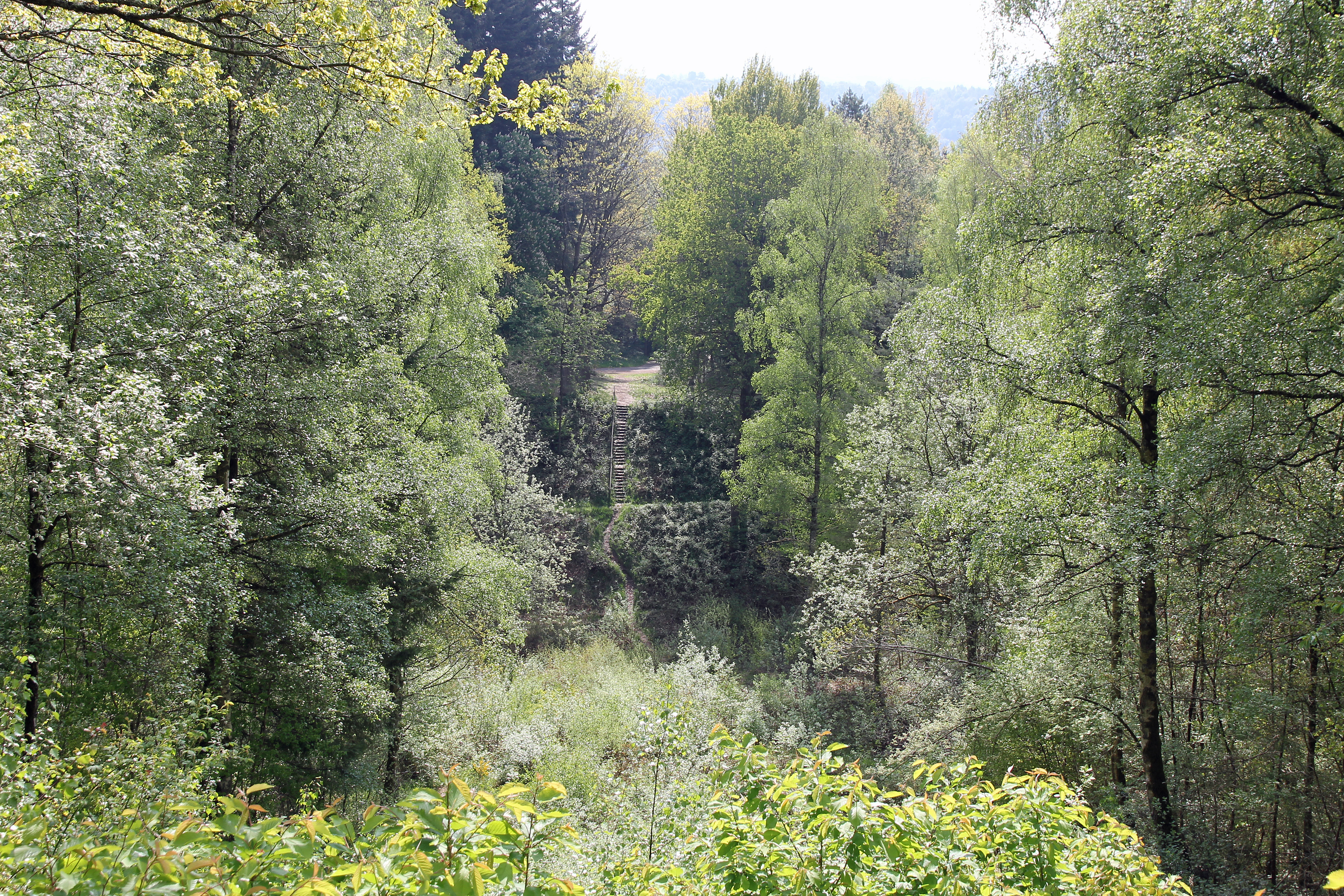
The explosion crater, seen from the memorial cross on the Kalvarienberg

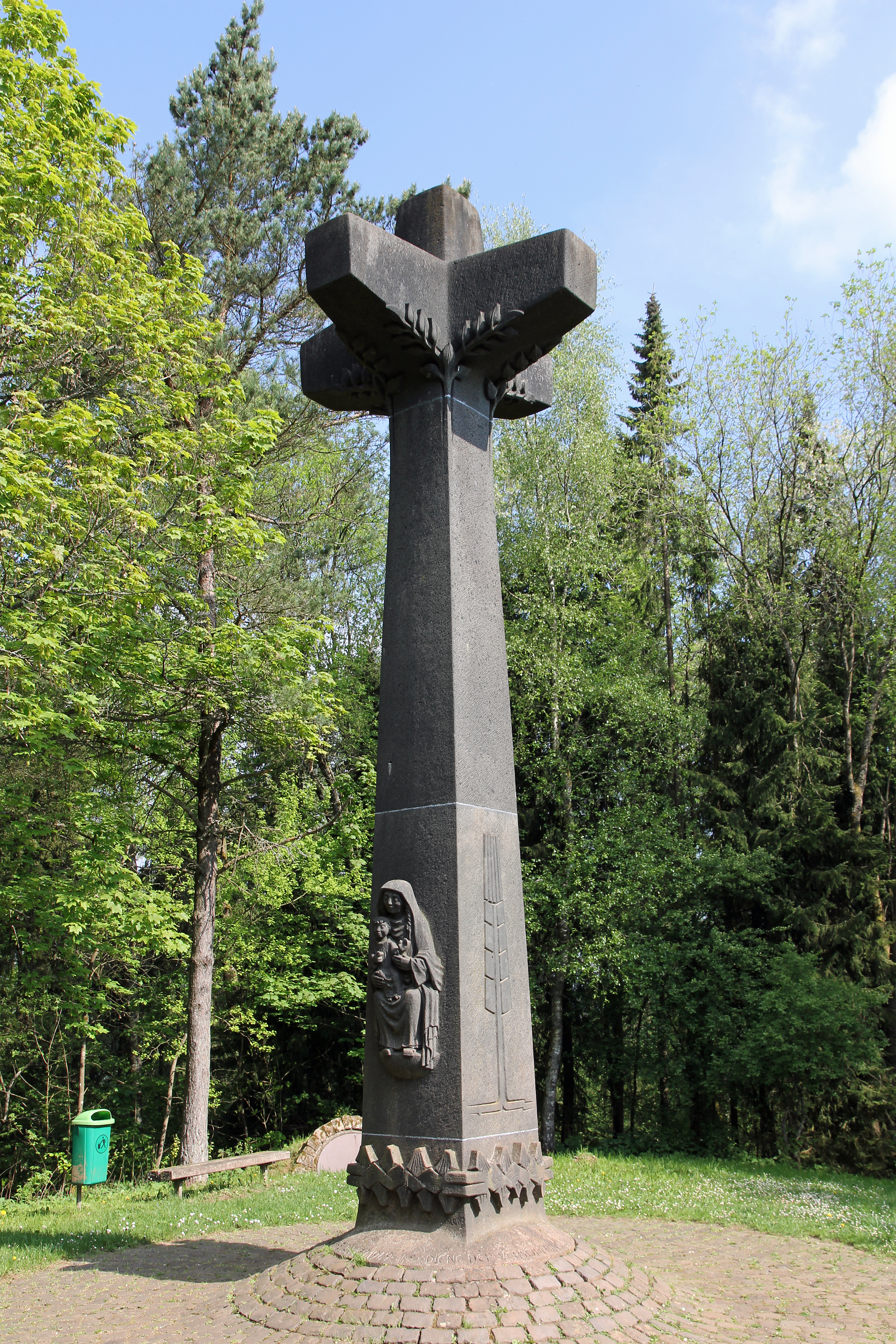
The memorial cross on the Kalvarienberg

On 15 July 1949 an ammunition depot exploded on the hill of Kalvarienberg in the Eifel mountains, in West Germany near the border with Luxembourg. The cause of the explosion, in which the town of Prüm was heavily damaged and 12 people killed, was never discovered. The crater, which is still visible today, is one of the largest man-made explosion craters in existence. A cross on the Kalvarienberg ('Calvary Hill') commemorates the victims of the disaster.

== History ==
When the Siegfried Line (in German the Westwall) was built in 1939, a standby bunker was constructed for the Wehrmacht inside the Kalvarienberg. The underground bunker was located 20 to 30 metres below the top of the hill and consisted of a 100-metre-long and a 60-metre-long tunnel. After the Second World War, French troops dumped 500 tons of ammunition there, which was supposed to be used to blow up the fortifications of the Siegfried Line. The population of Prüm knew about this storage and was concerned about it.

On 15 July 1949, there was a fire in the bunker. Prüm's Volunteer Fire Service sounded a fire alarm shortly before 7.00 pm and tried to put out the fire, but was unable to get into the deep galleries to reach the source of the fire. There was time to successfully extract them and to evacuate large parts of the population of Prüm, actions which saved many lives. The ammunition dump blew up around 8.22 pm. In the process, 250,000 m^{3} of rock, earth and bunker debris were thrown into the air, falling on Prüm. Twelve people were killed, 15 were injured and 965 people were left homeless. The water supply collapsed, telephone lines and some roads were completely destroyed. The hospital, school and post office, as well as numerous residential buildings, were left in ruins. The explosion crater measured 190 × 90 metres and was over 20 metres deep. The explosion was even registered by earthquake observatories.

This was the second time in short succession that Prüm had been devastated. During the war, 92 percent of the town had been destroyed by air raids and ground fighting. As Prüm was not completely rebuilt until 1949, 900 of its former inhabitants still lived outside the town.

After the explosion, the Luxembourg army from the garrison in Bitburg and the French army with its medical services gave assistance to the town. The fire brigades, teams from the German Red Cross from across the Eifel and the fire services of Koblenz and Neuwied were also involved in the rescue operation. Minister-President Peter Altmeier and Minister Johann Junglas hurried to the disaster area at night. There was much sympathy in the country and so the town was able to be rebuilt with the aid of donations.

The cause of the accident, which devastated Prüm and the surrounding area, was never ascertained. The suspicion that it was an act of sabotage was still held by some of the population even 60 years later. At the end of the 1990s, the Minister of Defence Rudolf Scharping and the French National Archives worked jointly to try to find an explanation, but without success.

In 1979, a seven-metre-high commemorative cross, made of basalt and created by artist Johann Baptist Lenz from Oberkail, was erected on the Kalvarienberg in remembrance of the explosion.

== See also ==
- Largest artificial non-nuclear explosions

== Literature ==
- H. Bonus: Erinnerungen an die Explosionskatastrophe in Prüm vor 40 Jahren in: Heimatkalender Landkreis Bitburg-Prüm 1989, published by the Kreisverwaltung Bitburg-Prüm, pp. 54–56, Trier, 1988.
- E. Urbanus: Wie ich die Explosionskatastrophe erlebte in: Der Prümer Landbote. Zeitschrift des Geschichtsvereins "Prümer Land". Das Prümer Land in Geschichte und Gegenwart, 24/89, p. 160, Prüm, 1989.
