= Brecht, Germany =

Brecht
- Municipality
- Coat of arms

- Location of Brecht within Eifelkreis Bitburg-Prüm district
- Interactive map of Brecht
- Location within Germany Location within Rhineland-Palatinate
- Coordinates: 49°58′53″N 6°26′11″E
- Country: Germany
- State: Rhineland-Palatinate
- District: Eifelkreis Bitburg-Prüm
- Municipal assoc.: Bitburger Land

Government
  - Mayor (2019–24): Michael Eppers

Area
  - Total: 4.5 km^{2} (1.7 sq mi)
- Elevation: 230 m (750 ft)

Population (2025-12-31)
  - Total: 184
  - Density: 41/km^{2} (110/sq mi)
- Time zone: UTC+01:00 (CET)
  - Summer (DST): UTC+02:00 (CEST)
- Postal codes: 54636
- Dialling codes: 06527
- Vehicle registration: BIT
- Website: www.brecht.de

Brecht (German pronunciation: [bʁɛçt]) is a municipality in the district of Bitburg-Prüm, in Rhineland-Palatinate, western Germany.
