= Habscheid =

- Municipality
- Coat of arms

- Location of Habscheid within Eifelkreis Bitburg-Prüm district
- Interactive map of Habscheid
- Location within Germany Location within Rhineland-Palatinate
- Coordinates: 50°11′20″N 6°16′06″E
- Country: Germany
- State: Rhineland-Palatinate
- District: Eifelkreis Bitburg-Prüm
- Municipal assoc.: Prüm

Government
  - Mayor (2019–24): Dietmar Fuchs

Area
  - Total: 17.60 km^{2} (6.80 sq mi)
- Elevation: 500 m (1,600 ft)

Population (2025-12-31)
  - Total: 652
  - Density: 37.0/km^{2} (95.9/sq mi)
- Time zone: UTC+01:00 (CET)
  - Summer (DST): UTC+02:00 (CEST)
- Postal codes: 54597
- Dialling codes: 06556, 06559
- Vehicle registration: BIT
- Website: www.habscheid-eifel.de

Habscheid is a municipality in the district of Bitburg-Prüm, in Rhineland-Palatinate, western Germany.
