= Biersdorf am See =

- Municipality
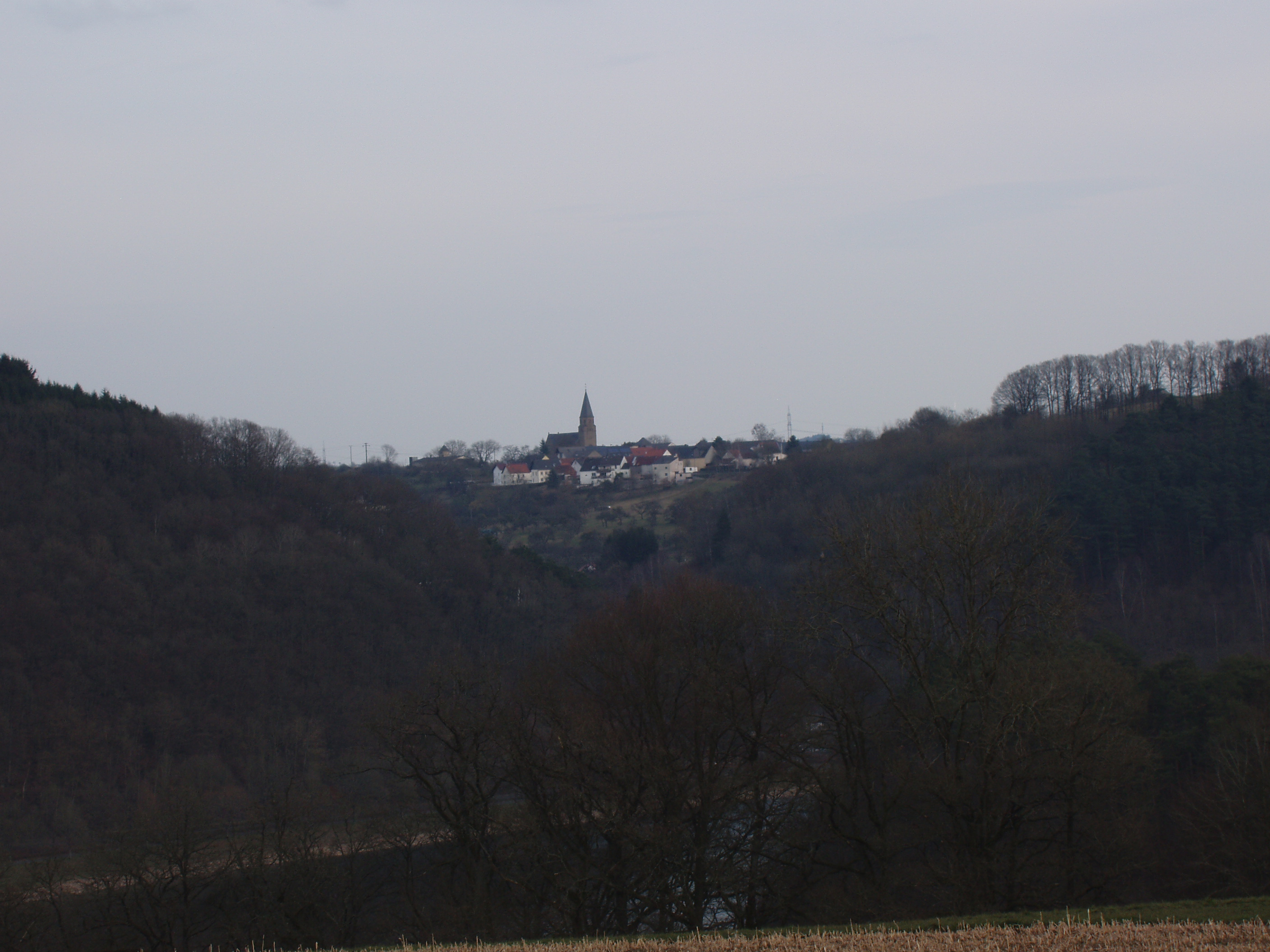

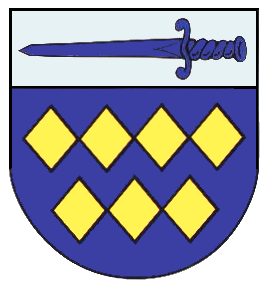
- Coat of arms

- Location of Biersdorf am See within Eifelkreis Bitburg-Prüm district
- Interactive map of Biersdorf am See
- Location within Germany Location within Rhineland-Palatinate
- Coordinates: 50°00′56″N 06°26′59″E
- Country: Germany
- State: Rhineland-Palatinate
- District: Eifelkreis Bitburg-Prüm
- Municipal assoc.: Bitburger Land

Government
  - Mayor (2019–24): Arnold Kootz

Area
  - Total: 3.22 km^{2} (1.24 sq mi)
- Elevation: 340 m (1,120 ft)

Population (2025-12-31)
  - Total: 574
  - Density: 178/km^{2} (462/sq mi)
- Time zone: UTC+01:00 (CET)
  - Summer (DST): UTC+02:00 (CEST)
- Postal codes: 54636
- Dialling codes: 06569
- Vehicle registration: BIT
- Website: www.biersdorf.de

Biersdorf am See is a municipality in the district of Bitburg-Prüm, in Rhineland-Palatinate, western Germany.

== Geography ==
The place is located in the South Eifel nature park, northwest of the district town of Bitburg on the Bitburg reservoir, which is located in the west of the municipality. The 3.22 km² large municipal area extends at an altitude of 280 to 340 m above sea level. 61.3% of it is used for agriculture, with 12.7% a comparatively small part of forest exists.

== History ==
Like large parts of the Bitburger Gutland, Biersdorf am See was already settled in pre-Christian times, as indicated by barrows and ceramic finds. Several sanded burial mounds on a ridge south-east of the Steifelstein have been proven. It was first mentioned as "Bersdorf" in 1301.

Since 1970 the community has belonged to the Bitburg-Land Verbandsgemeinde, which was merged into the Bitburger Land Verbandsgemeinde on 1 July 2014. The community has had the addition of "am See" to its name since 6 March 1995.
