= Bleialf =

- Municipality
- Coat of arms

- Location of Bleialf within Eifelkreis Bitburg-Prüm district
- Interactive map of Bleialf
- Location within Germany Location within Rhineland-Palatinate
- Coordinates: 50°14′22″N 6°17′11″E
- Country: Germany
- State: Rhineland-Palatinate
- District: Eifelkreis Bitburg-Prüm
- Municipal assoc.: Prüm

Government
  - Mayor (2019–24): Richard Heinz

Area
  - Total: 7.55 km^{2} (2.92 sq mi)
- Elevation: 485 m (1,591 ft)

Population (2025-12-31)
  - Total: 1,304
  - Density: 173/km^{2} (447/sq mi)
- Time zone: UTC+01:00 (CET)
  - Summer (DST): UTC+02:00 (CEST)
- Postal codes: 54608
- Dialling codes: 06555
- Vehicle registration: BIT
- Website: www.bleialf.de

Bleialf is a municipality in the district of Bitburg-Prüm, in Rhineland-Palatinate, western Germany.

== Geography ==
Bleialf lies in the North Eifel Nature Park. The Alfbach stream flows through the village.

== Attractions ==
There is an ancient mine shaft and tunnels that are no longer in use, which now are open to public.
