= Watzerath =

- Municipality
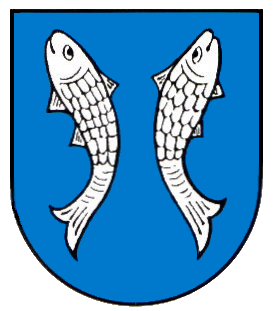
- Coat of arms

- Location of Watzerath within Eifelkreis Bitburg-Prüm district
- Interactive map of Watzerath
- Location within Germany Location within Rhineland-Palatinate
- Coordinates: 50°11′05″N 6°21′46″E
- Country: Germany
- State: Rhineland-Palatinate
- District: Eifelkreis Bitburg-Prüm
- Municipal assoc.: Prüm

Government
  - Mayor (2019–24): Rainer Kockelmann

Area
  - Total: 4.62 km^{2} (1.78 sq mi)
- Elevation: 390 m (1,280 ft)

Population (2025-12-31)
  - Total: 425
  - Density: 92.0/km^{2} (238/sq mi)
- Time zone: UTC+01:00 (CET)
  - Summer (DST): UTC+02:00 (CEST)
- Postal codes: 54595
- Dialling codes: 06551
- Vehicle registration: BIT
- Website: www.watzerath.info

Watzerath is a municipality in the district of Bitburg-Prüm, in Rhineland-Palatinate, western Germany.
