= Waxweiler =

- Municipality
- Coat of arms

- Location of Waxweiler within Eifelkreis Bitburg-Prüm district
- Interactive map of Waxweiler
- Location within Germany Location within Rhineland-Palatinate
- Coordinates: 50°5′30″N 6°21′52″E
- Country: Germany
- State: Rhineland-Palatinate
- District: Eifelkreis Bitburg-Prüm
- Municipal assoc.: Arzfeld

Government
  - Mayor (2019–24): Manfred Groben (CDU)

Area
  - Total: 5.96 km^{2} (2.30 sq mi)
- Elevation: 360 m (1,180 ft)

Population (2025-12-31)
  - Total: 1,036
  - Density: 174/km^{2} (450/sq mi)
- Time zone: UTC+01:00 (CET)
  - Summer (DST): UTC+02:00 (CEST)
- Postal codes: 54649
- Dialling codes: 06554
- Vehicle registration: BIT
- Website: www.waxweiler.com

Waxweiler is a municipality in the county of Bitburg-Prüm, in Rhineland-Palatinate, western Germany. It is located in the Eifel, south of Prüm and is accessible through the Autobahn 60. The parish of about 1100 inhabitants lies 345 meters (1,132 feet) above sea level.

== History ==
Roman artifacts dating to AD 150 on the hill "Am Hüttenberg" attest to the early origins of Waxweiler. In the Middle Ages Waxweiler was part of Austrasia in the Frankish Empire. Around 700, Saint Willibrord (657–739), a Benedictine monk from Northumbria, brought Christianity to Waxweiler (see also Dancing procession of Echternach) and at that time the Church was founded in the town. The first official documents mention Waxweiler in 943. From 962 Waxweiler belonged to the Holy Roman Empire until 1804 and the time of Napoleon. Prior to the opening of the Trier–Gerolstein railroad in 1871, four-span stage coaches traversed the routes Trier–Köln and Trier–Aachen. These passed through Waxweiler daily, one going and once coming. Shortly after the start of World War I, two German soldiers on guard duty were killed by friendly fire in Waxweiler. Until the end of World War I in 1919, a stage coach operated from Waxweiler to nearby villages. World War II started in 1939 and on January 8, 1945 a massive bomb attack occurred on Waxweiler. In 1945 and 1946, to make emergency repairs for extensive destruction by bombing and artillery, every able-bodied male inhabitant, age 16 to 60, was obligated to perform repairs or equivalent work without pay. Shortly before Christmas in 2004, a massive fire destroyed the bell tower of the church and caused extensive damage. The church and tower were rebuilt within two years.

It has been used as a special stage for the Rallye Deutschland.
