= Buchet =

- Founded: 1888; 1899 start of automobile engine production 1911 start of automobile production
- Headquarters: Factory: Ivry, France (1888 - 1919); 73 Rue de Sèvres, Billancourt, France (1919-1930) Paris showroom 68 Avenue de la Grande Armée, Paris,
- Key people: Élie-Victor Buchet
- Products: Automobiles; Motorcycles; Engines

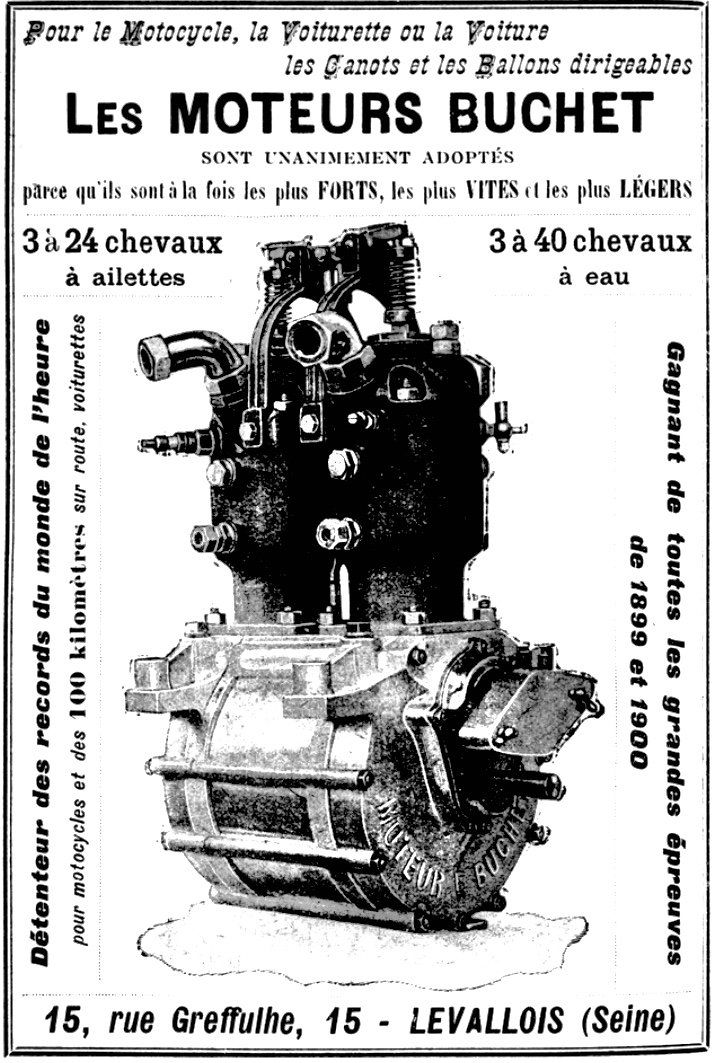
Buchet Engines (1901)

Buchet (French: [by.ʃɛ]) was a French motorcycle and automobile manufacturer between 1899 and 1930.

== Origins ==
Société Buchet was founded in 1888 at Levallois-Perret as a producer of lamps. In 1899 Élie-Victor Buchet began to manufacture engines for auto-makers. Buchet engines were also used to power other manufacturers' aircraft (from 1906), and motorcycles.

== The business ==
It was not till 1911, initially at Levallois-Perret, and after 1919 at Billancourt, that Buchet started to produce cars of its own.

In 1919 the company was purchased by Gaston Sailly and renamed Gaston Sailly, Moteurs et Automobiles Buchet, with a new factory at Billencourt. The cars continued to be branded with the "Buchet" name, however.

By the end of the decade Buchet was one of a number of automakers to find itself competed out of business by France's by now increasingly dominant larger auto-makers. Activity ceased at the factory at the end of 1929, and in 1930 Buchet went out of business.

== The cars ==
=== Early cars ===
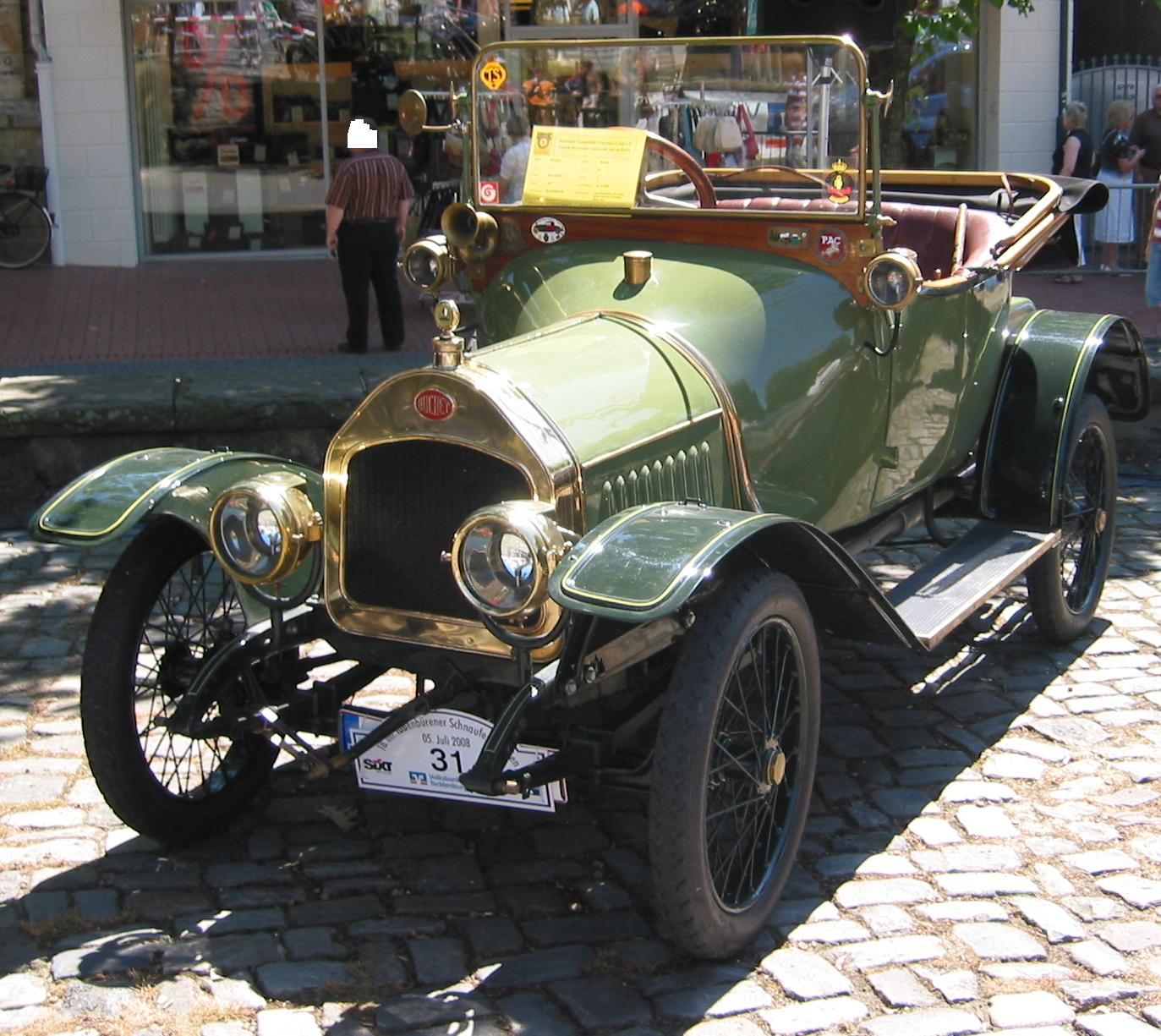
1912 Buchet

The first Buchet automobile was a 12/20 hp model with a 4-cylinder 1996 cc engine and a three speed transmission.

During the early part of the war, between 1914 and 1915, Buchet were delivering chassis to the Hollingdrake Automobile Company in Stockport, England. Each included a four-cylinder 10HP side-valve engine and a transmission. Hollingdrake mounted their own bodies - mostly open two-seaters and coupés - and sold the Anglo-French car branded as the Ascot, priced at 195 British pounds.

At the 15th Paris Motor Show in October 1919 Buchet were exhibiting a 1,456 cc (8CV/HP) engined car. Its wheelbase was 2,300 mm (90.6 in).

=== 1920s ===
After the relocation, in 1919, to premises in Billancourt, Buchet remained largely faithful to their by now tried and trusted methods, and as the 1920s progressed they came to be seen as somewhat conservative.

In 1924 the manufacturer was offering the "Buchet Type B4 8/10HP" which used a 1545cc 4-cylinder side-valve engine, but during 1925 this was succeeded by The "Buchet Type B5" with a modified valvegear assembly that now incorporated rocker arms. The Type B4 on display at the Motor Show in October 1924 was priced at 21,800 francs for a "Torpedo" bodied car and 27,950 francs for a "Conduite interieure" (two-box sedan/saloon/berline) version. There were also a so-called "Normande" (light truck) version listed. and a smaller 1,131cc (6 CV/HP) engined model.

By 1929, when production came to an end, the little 4-cylinder 1,131cc (6 CV/HP) model was one of two Buchet models still listed. The other was a 6-cylinder 1,737cc (10 CV/HP) powered car which had been launched in 1928.

== The motorcycles ==
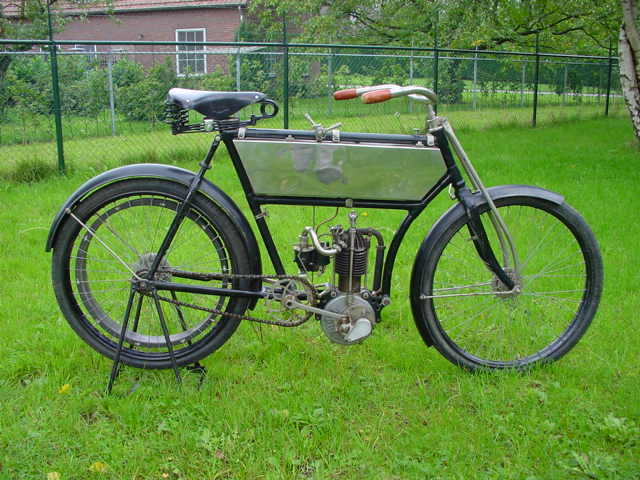
1903 Buchet Mark-1, La Foudre (The Lightning)

From 1900-1911, Buchet was an automotive machine and motorcycle manufacturer. His 1903 3 litre twin-cylinder model achieved 75 mph (121 km/h) in the hands of Maurice Fournier. It was also used as the chassis for Ernest Archdeacon's experimental 'propeller driven motorcycle', the Aéromotocyclette Anzani of 1906.

=== La Foudre ===
La Foudre (Lightning) was a pioneer of French motorcycle history. It used a 350 cc 'inlet over exhaust' Buchet engine. The inlet valve worked on the atmospheric principle, but the exhaust valve was operated by pushrod and rocker. It had an accumulator and coil ignition system, and a Longuemare carburettor. It used both front and rear wheel brakes and 26 inch wheels.

=== Racing ===
On 25 February 1900 the Circuit du Sud Ouest was held in Pau. Monsieur Marcellin finished the 337 kilometre event in 5 hours 47 minutes 14 seconds and was the first motor cycle home, and third overall.

On the 23 February 1900 Monsieur Marcellin's 7 hp Buchet 'Quadricycle' finished second in the 'Turin-Pinerolo-Saluzzo-Cuneo-Racconigi-Turin' event. He covered the 130 kilometres in 2 hours 17 minutes 54 seconds.
