= MUH Arla =

- Native name: MUH Arla eG
- Company type: eG
- Industry: Foodstuffs
- Founded: 1966
- Headquarters: Pronsfeld, Germany
- Key people: Rainer Sievers, Executive Chairman
- Revenue: 693M EUR (2011)
- Number of employees: 780 (2011)
- Website: arlafoods.de

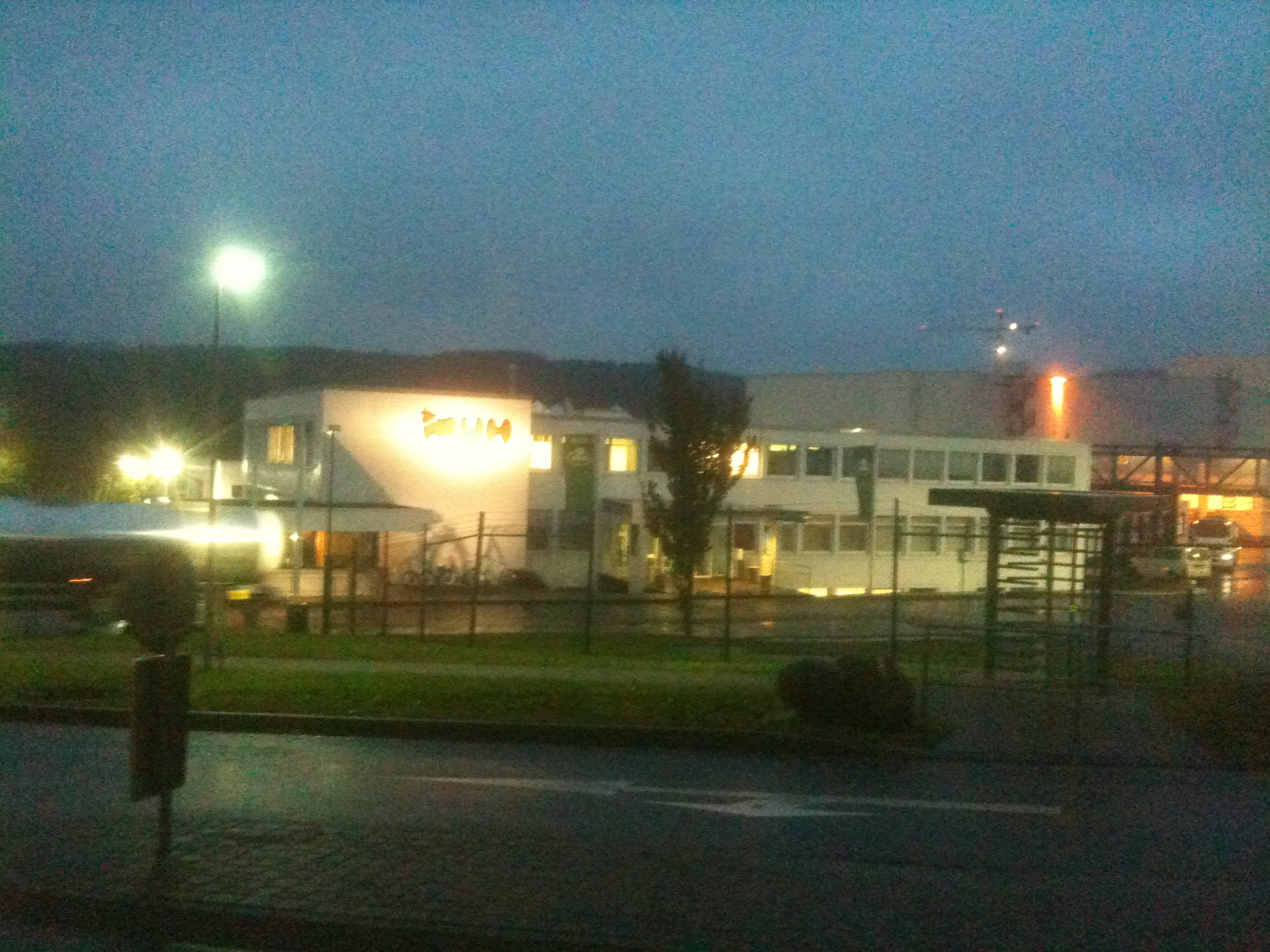
MUH factory in Pronsfeld

MUH Arla is a cooperative dairy firm with its head office in Pronsfeld in the county of Bitburg-Prüm in the German state of Rhineland-Palatinate. In 2011 it processed 1,317 million kilograms of milk, that had been supplied by 2,442 milk producers (as at 31 December 2011) from the regions of the Eifel, Moselle, the Rhineland, the Lower Rhine, the Bergisches Land, Belgium and Luxembourg. The cooperative has over 48 filling sites that produce over a billion cartons annually. In October 2012, It was reported that, Muh and Arla merged into Germany's third-largest dairy. In September 2017, Arla Foods would be expecting growth at the Eifel site Pronsfeld.

== Range ==
MUH's product range includes:

- UHT milk
- ESL milk
- Condensed milk
- Cream
- Sour cream
- Milkshakes
- Coffee cream
- dessert sauce
- Butter/Margarine
