= Pronsfeld =

- Municipality
- Coat of arms

- Location of Pronsfeld within Eifelkreis Bitburg-Prüm district
- Interactive map of Pronsfeld
- Location within Germany Location within Rhineland-Palatinate
- Coordinates: 50°09′38″N 6°20′29″E
- Country: Germany
- State: Rhineland-Palatinate
- District: Eifelkreis Bitburg-Prüm
- Municipal assoc.: Prüm

Government
  - Mayor (2019–24): Harald Urfels

Area
  - Total: 15.36 km^{2} (5.93 sq mi)
- Elevation: 380 m (1,250 ft)

Population (2025-12-31)
  - Total: 1,004
  - Density: 65.36/km^{2} (169.3/sq mi)
- Time zone: UTC+01:00 (CET)
  - Summer (DST): UTC+02:00 (CEST)
- Postal codes: 54597
- Dialling codes: 06556
- Vehicle registration: BIT
- Website: www.pronsfeld-eifel.de

Pronsfeld is a municipality in the district of Bitburg-Prüm, in Rhineland-Palatinate, western Germany.

== Economy and infrastructure ==
Pronsfeld is the location of the head office of MUH Arla, the largest UHT milk manufacturer in Europe.
