= 174th Infantry Brigade (United States) =

Infantry brigade of the United States Army

- 174th Infantry Brigade shoulder sleeve insignia
- Active: 1917-1919; 1921-1945; 1947-1951; 1997-1999; 2006–present
- Country: United States
- Branch: Army Multi-component
- Type: Infantry
- Role: Training
- Size: Brigade
- Part of: 85th Support Command
- Garrison/HQ: Joint Base McGuire–Dix–Lakehurst, New Jersey
- Nicknames: "Patriot Brigade" "The Away Brigade"
- Motto: Pium in Cuspis (Patriots on Point)
- Colors: Red, Blue and Steel
- Mascots: Frank, the NY/NJ Continental Soldier
- Engagements: World War I World War II
- Decorations: Army Superior Unit Award (ASUA)

Commanders
- Commanding Officer: COL Matthew Bunch
- Notable commanders: COL David Sanders; COL Michael Wawrzyniak; COL Craig A. Osborne

Insignia
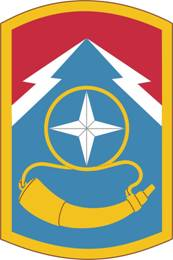
- Designated but not authorized shoulder sleeve insignia

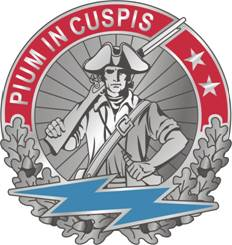
- 174th Infantry Brigade DUI

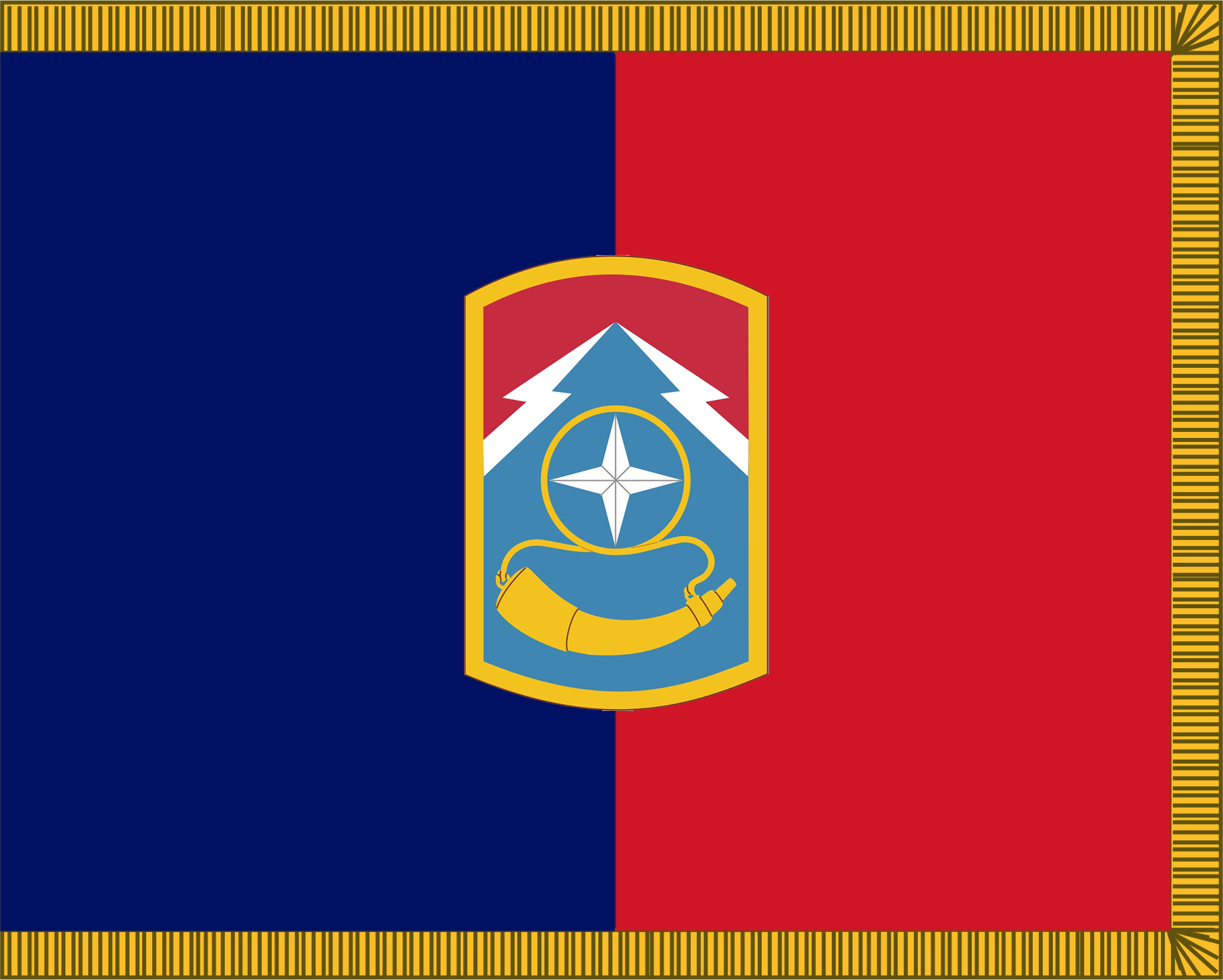
- 174th Infantry Brigade Flag

The 174th Infantry Brigade is an infantry brigade of the United States Army based at the Fort Dix entity of Joint Base McGuire-Dix-Lakehurst, New Jersey. A multi-component training unit, the brigade provides operational training and increased readiness for units in the continental Northeast.

The brigade was deployed for both World War I and World War II. Reorganized and redesignated numerous times, the 174th Infantry Brigade has been a reserve unit of the United States Army for most of its existence, seeing only short stints in the Active Duty forces and a combat role.

Reactivated in 2006 as an active duty, combined arms training brigade, the brigade is responsible for preparing Soldiers of the Reserve and National Guard for deployment through battle training in maneuvers, equipment, and other details. As such, many personnel in the brigade are instructors who are themselves combat veterans of Operation Iraqi Freedom and Operation Enduring Freedom.

== Organization ==
The 174th Infantry Brigade is a Combined Arms Training Brigade (CATB) assigned to the 85th Support Command. Like all formations of the 85th Support Command, the brigade is not a combat formation, but instead trains Army Reserve and Army National Guard units preparing for deployment. As of January 2026, the brigade consists of a Headquarters and Headquarters Company, five active duty battalions, and five reserve battalions.

- 174th Infantry Brigade, at Joint Base McGuire–Dix–Lakehurst (NJ)
  - Headquarters and Headquarters Company, at Joint Base McGuire–Dix–Lakehurst (NJ)
  - 1st Battalion, 307th Regiment (Infantry), at Joint Base McGuire–Dix–Lakehurst (NJ)
  - 1st Battalion, 309th Regiment (Training Support), at Joint Base McGuire–Dix–Lakehurst (NJ)
  - 2nd Battalion, 309th Regiment (Training Support), at Joint Base McGuire–Dix–Lakehurst (NJ)
  - 2nd Battalion, 312th Regiment (Training Support), in Coraopolis (PA)
  - 3rd Battalion, 312th Regiment (Training Support), at Fort Meade (MD)
  - 3rd Battalion, 313th Regiment (Logistical Support), at Joint Base McGuire–Dix–Lakehurst (NJ)
  - 1st Battalion, 314th Regiment (Infantry), at Joint Base McGuire–Dix–Lakehurst (NJ)
  - 3rd Battalion, 314th Regiment (Field Artillery), at Joint Base McGuire–Dix–Lakehurst (NJ)
  - 1st Battalion, 315th Regiment (Brigade Support Battalion), at Joint Base McGuire–Dix–Lakehurst (NJ)
  - 2nd Battalion, 315th Regiment (Brigade Engineer Battalion), at Joint Base McGuire–Dix–Lakehurst (NJ)

The brigade's four training support battalions and logistical support battalion are Army Reserve formations.

== History ==
=== World War I ===
The 174th Infantry Brigade was first constituted on 5 August 1917 in the National Army. It was organized on 25 August 1917 at Camp Dix, New Jersey, and assigned to the 87th Division. It never saw combat in World War I, like the other units of the 87th Division, the brigade was used for labor duties and a pool of reinforcements. It received a campaign streamer for World War I without an inscription. After the war, it was demobilized on 23 May 1919 at Camp Dix, New Jersey.

Reorganized in December 1921 at Shreveport, Louisiana, the brigade was redesignated on 23 March 1925 as the 174th Brigade. It was again redesignated on 24 August 1936 as the 174th Infantry Brigade. On 13 February 1942, the unit was converted and redesignated as 3rd platoon, 87th Reconnaissance Troop, still assigned to the 87th Division. This consolidation also occurred to the 173rd Infantry Brigade. That December, the unit was ordered into active military service and reorganized along with the rest of the division at Camp McCain, Mississippi, which became an Infantry division. It was then mechanized the next year.

=== World War II ===
The 87th Infantry Division arrived in Scotland on 22 October 1944, and trained in England until the end of November. It landed in France in early December, and moved to Metz, where, on the 8th, it went into action against and took Fort Driant. The troop followed its division as it shifted to the vicinity of Gross Rederching near the Saar-German border on 10 December, and capturing Rimling, Obergailbach, and Guiderkirch.

The 87th Division was moving into Germany when Von Rundstedt launched his offensive in the Ardennes. The Division was placed in reserve from 24 December until 28 December, before engaging in the Battle of the Bulge in Belgium on 29 December. In a fluctuating battle, it captured Moircy on 30 December and Remagne on 31 December. On 2 January 1945, it took Germont, on 10 January Tillet, and reached the Ourthe by 13 January. On 15 January 1945, the Division moved to Luxembourg to relieve the 4th Infantry Division along the Sauer and seized Wasserbillig on 23 January. The 87th moved to the vicinity of St. Vith on 28 January, then attacked and captured Schlierbach, Selz, and Hogden by the end of the month. After the fall of Neuendorf on 9 February, the Division went on the defensive until 26 February, when Ormont and Hallschlag were taken in night attacks. The 87th crossed the Kyll River on 6 March, took Dollendorf on 8 March, and after a brief rest, returned to combat on 13 March 1945, crossing the Moselle on 16 March and clearing Koblenz, on 18–19 March. The Division crossed the Rhine on 25–26 March and despite strong opposition, consolidated its bridgehead, and secured Grossenlinden and Langgöns. On 7 April, it jumped off in an attack which carried it through Thuringia into Saxony. Plauen fell on 17 April, and the Division took up defensive positions on 20 April, about 4 miles from the Czech border. On 6 May 1945, it took Falkenstein and maintained its positions until VE-day.

The 87th Division returned to the United States in July 1945 expecting to be called upon to play a role in the defeat of the Japanese, but the sudden termination of the war in the Pacific while the division was reassembling at Fort Benning changed the future of the 87th. The Division was inactivated on 21 September 1945. The 87th Reconnaissance Troop was inactivated on the same day.

=== Cold War era ===
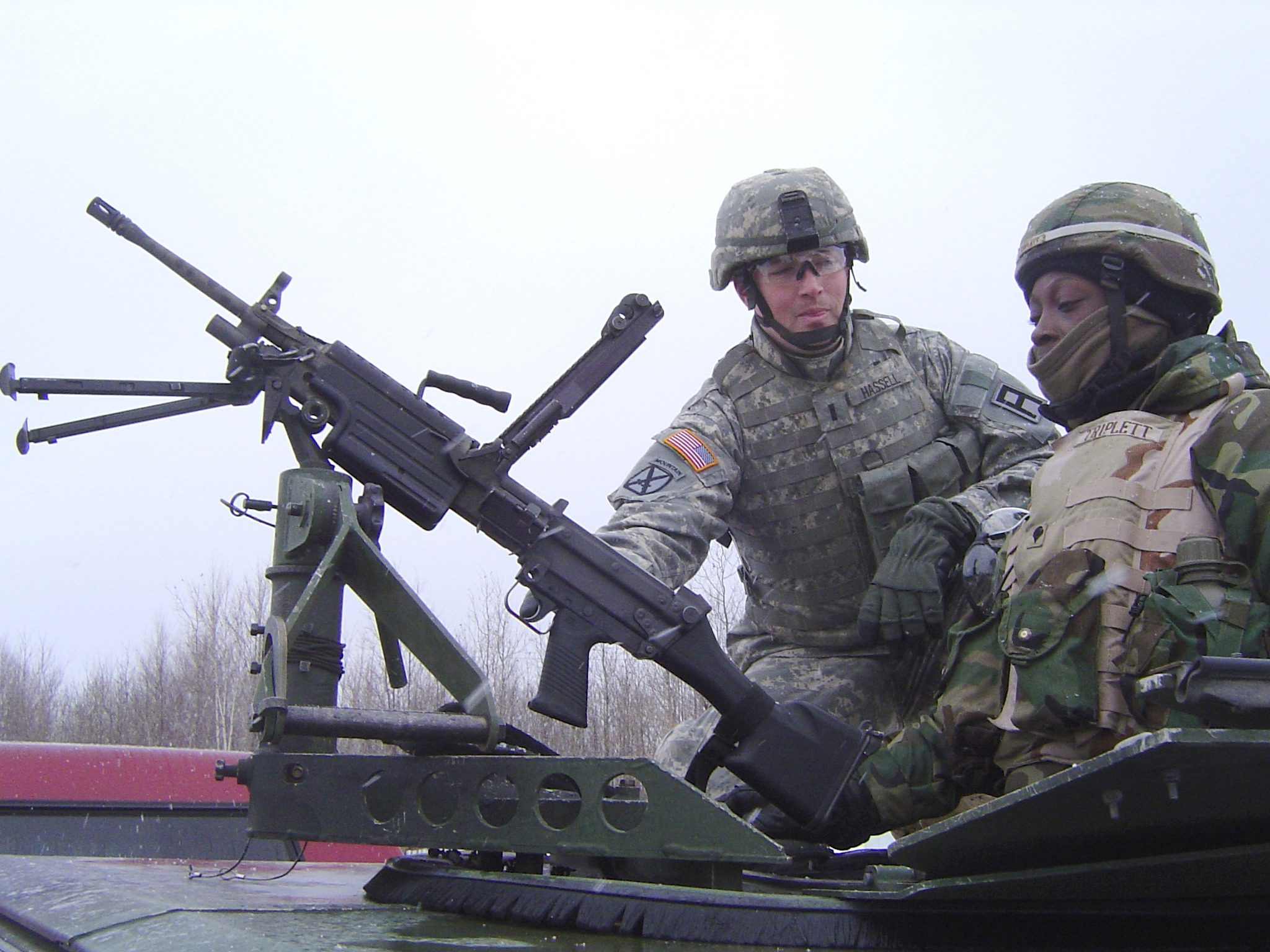
A soldier of the 174th Infantry Brigade trains a reservist on convoy duty at Fort Drum, New York.

The 87th Reconnaissance Troop was reorganized and redesignated in April 1947 as the 87th Mechanized Cavalry Reconnaissance Troop in the reserves. It was then activated the next month at Birmingham, Alabama. At the same time, the Organized Reserves were undergoing a transformation into the Army Reserve. The unit was again reorganized and redesignated in 1949 as the 87th Reconnaissance Company before being inactivated in December 1951 in Birmingham.

The unit was once again designated as the 174th Infantry Brigade following a conversion and redesignation in March 1963. For the next 30 years, the brigade would continue as a Reserve unit in inactive status and would never be called on to participate in any conflicts. In 1997, the brigade was withdrawn from the Reserve and activated in the Regular Army at Fort Drum, New York, before being inactivated two years later.

=== Training brigade ===
The brigade headquarters were again reactivated on 1 December 2006 at Fort Drum, by reflagging 2nd Brigade, 78th Division (Training Support). It was one of 16 reserve brigades to be activated for the purpose of training. The brigade, which is headquartered at Fort Drum and is subordinate to the First Army Division East, is responsible for early stages of training for other reserve soldiers who have been alerted for deployment. The brigade offers the opportunity for veterans of Operation Iraqi Freedom and Operation Enduring Freedom to use their skills to train new soldiers who will be entering the field of operations in Iraq or Afghanistan. This training includes convoy live-fire training exercises, and techniques in dealing with improvised explosive devices, which are the primary cause of casualties in the operations.

During the summer of 2007, the brigade was mobilized to Fort Dix for training along with the 72nd Field Artillery Brigade from April until September. Soldiers of the 174th Infantry Brigade trained other units in land navigation, area security, urban operations, marksmanship, and live fire exercises. Most of the soldiers being trained were members of the Army National Guard. The brigade received distinctive unit insignia and shoulder sleeve insignia in September 2007. These items contained allusions to the brigade's honors during World War I and II, and its history with the 78th Infantry Division. However, as it is subordinate to the First Army, soldiers of the brigade wear that patch on their shoulders instead. Later that month, the brigade was again mobilized to Fort Bragg, North Carolina for another training mission.

October 2016 saw the 174th Infantry Brigade reorganize after the deactivation of the 72d Field Artillery Brigade in 2015. The 174th IN BDE is now configured as a Combined Arms Training Brigade (CATB) under 1st Army's Division East.

== Honors ==
=== Unit decorations ===
Ribbon	Award	Year	Orders
Army	Superior Unit Award	2008-2011	Permanent Orders 332-07 announcing award of the Army Superior Unit award

=== Campaign streamers ===
Conflict	Streamer	Year(s)
World War I	No Inscription	
World War II	Rhineland	1944–1945
World War II	Ardennes-Alsace	1944–1945
World War II	Central Europe	1945
