= Obere Kyll =

Coordinates: 50°20′29″N 6°35′09″E

Obere Kyll coat of arms

Obere Kyll is a former Verbandsgemeinde ("collective municipality") in the district Vulkaneifel, in Rhineland-Palatinate, Germany. It was situated on the upper course of the river Kyll, approx. 55 km south-west of Bonn. The seat of the Verbandsgemeinde was in Jünkerath. In January 2019 it was merged into the Verbandsgemeinde Gerolstein.

The Verbandsgemeinde Obere Kyll consisted of the following Ortsgemeinden ("local municipalities"):

1. Birgel
2. Esch
3. Feusdorf
4. Gönnersdorf
5. Hallschlag
6. Jünkerath
7. Kerschenbach
8. Lissendorf
9. Ormont
10. Reuth
11. Scheid
12. Schüller
13. Stadtkyll
14. Steffeln
