= Scheid, Rhineland-Palatinate =

Scheid
- Municipality
- Coat of arms

- Location of Scheid within Vulkaneifel district
- Interactive map of Scheid
- Location within Germany Location within Rhineland-Palatinate
- Coordinates: 50°21′33.47″N 6°25′13.88″E
- Country: Germany
- State: Rhineland-Palatinate
- District: Vulkaneifel
- Municipal assoc.: Gerolstein

Government
  - Mayor (2019–24): Gottfried Hack

Area
  - Total: 5.49 km^{2} (2.12 sq mi)
- Elevation: 590 m (1,940 ft)

Population (2025-12-31)
  - Total: 132
  - Density: 24.0/km^{2} (62.3/sq mi)
- Time zone: UTC+01:00 (CET)
  - Summer (DST): UTC+02:00 (CEST)
- Postal codes: 54611
- Dialling codes: 06557
- Vehicle registration: DAU
- Website: www.scheid-eifel.de

Scheid (German pronunciation: [ʃaɪt]) is an Ortsgemeinde – a municipality belonging to a Verbandsgemeinde, a kind of collective municipality – in the Vulkaneifel district in Rhineland-Palatinate, Germany. It belongs to the Verbandsgemeinde of Gerolstein, whose seat is in the municipality of Gerolstein.

== Geography ==
=== Location ===
The municipality lies in the Vulkaneifel, a part of the Eifel known for its volcanic history, geographical and geological features, and even ongoing activity today, including gases that sometimes well up from the earth.

Scheid is the northwesternmost place in the Vulkaneifel district. It lies roughly 1 km northwest of Hallschlag on a mountain ridge. Its elevation is 593 m above sea level.

=== Name ===
The name Scheid might best be explained as coming from the German word Wasserscheide, cognate with, and meaning the same as (at least in some varieties of English) the word “watershed”, for south from Scheid flows the Hallschlager Bach and north from the village flows the Scheider or Gonsbach. Still others derive the name from the road junction here in Roman times, when the road from Trier to Cologne and Aachen branched at what is now Scheid (scheiden means “divide” or “split” in German; this is cognate with the English word “shed” [v]). On the other hand, placename researchers hold that the name is not German at all. They derive it from the old Celtic word keito-n, meaning “wood” or “forest” (cf. Welsh coedwig and Breton koadeg).

== History ==
In 1276, Scheid had its first documentary mention as a holding of the Counts of Neuenahr. The document itself deals with Count Theoderich von Neuenahr's widow Mechtildis's and her children's pledge of their lordship of Neuenahr and other holdings with the exception of the estate of “Greuel in Scheid” for four years to Archbishop of Cologne Sigfrid. At this time, the village consisted of no more than a few farms. The same document also held the Archbishop to a yearly payment of three Marks from the tolls that he would raise in Scheid to Wincmarcus von Gelzdorf. With a busy road – busy with mediaeval trade traffic – dating from Roman times, it is understandable that there would have been a “tollhouse” in Scheid.

According to local oral history, there was once a village of Niederscheid over on the opposite slope to where today's Scheid is, about 500 m to the east. The village lore holds that it was wiped out by the Plague, but no written records of this event have survived.

The villagers of Scheid have from days of yore won their livelihood exclusively from agriculture. When the Jünkerath-Malmedy railway was built, the dwellers of the Upper Kyll Valley were afforded better links to the surrounding area.

At the turn of the 20th century, a grenade factory was built 3 km from Scheid, which furnished jobs. This factory was utterly destroyed by fire after the First World War. From the late 1920s to the mid-1930s, despite the region's generally high rate of joblessness, construction was busily being carried out. This mainly entailed the building of the (second) Siegfried Line.

The bunkers and line of dragon's teeth bordered right on Scheid. On the one hand, this brought the region's inhabitants better financial circumstances, but on the other hand, only a short time later they found themselves right at an active defensive line, for between September 1944 and March 1945, the front ran right through Scheid as the Allies thrust their way into Germany late in the Second World War. Scheid was almost utterly destroyed in the war.

In 1927, the municipal council planned and decided, at the then mayor Josef Schröder's suggestion, to clear 29 ha of wasteland to create grazing land for the municipality's livestock owners. The undertaking was approved by the Bonn Chamber of Agriculture and overseen by professionals. The cost for the whole project was assessed at 41,000 Reichsmark, of which 18,000 Reichsmark was afforded through a grant. The municipality had to come up with the rest. The project was a great success.

Flurbereinigung was carried out between 1958 and 1970.

After the Second World War ended, half Scheid's municipal area had become unusable for any normal, peacetime purpose because of demolished Siegfried Line bunkers and all the minefields; there were roughly a million mines.

In 1956, the community centre was built, with a fire brigade area, and also a freezer room with 30 freezing chests. In 1964, sewerage and sidewalks were built.

After much negotiating with the diocese, leave was granted to tear the old chapel down. The municipality financed the new chapel with a grant from the diocese. After it was finished, the municipality had to hand the new chapel over to the parish. Along with this work, a graveyard with greenspace was also laid out.

In 1969, the seven wayside crosses were renewed so that an old tradition would not be forgotten.

In 1970 came administrative reform. Ever since then, the forester's office, the district waterworks, the agricultural advisory centre and school, the cadastral office and the lawcourt that are responsible for Scheid, have been in Prüm.

In the early 1970s, there were 28 agricultural businesses in Scheid; by 2001, there were only seven, only five of which were full-time operations. Tourism has challenged farming's status as the municipality's top income earner. Nevertheless, despite the great number of agricultural businesses that have been forsaken by their owners, all usable agricultural lands in Scheid are still fully used.

Scheid has rebounded from the destruction of the Second World War. Nevertheless, Scheid's scenery includes not only its forest and open landscape with its hedgerows, but also “dragon’s teeth” tank traps left over from wartime, reminders of what had occurred there.

In June 2026, a repowered wind park with Wind turbines (Nordex N163, 7-MW-class) has been reopened.

== Politics ==
=== Municipal council ===
The council is made up of 6 council members, who were elected by majority vote at the municipal election held on 7 June 2009, and the honorary mayor as chairman.

=== Mayor ===
Scheid's mayor is Gottfried Hack.

=== Coat of arms ===
The German blazon reads: In Silber durch einen blauen schräglinken Wellenbalken geteilt, vorne eine grüne Fichte mit Astwerk, hinten ein rotes schäglinkes Hifthorn.

The municipality's arms might in English heraldic language be described thus: Argent a bend sinister wavy between a spruce with two lower branches couped vert and a bugle-horn bendwise sinister gules.

The spruce tree is a canting reference to the municipality's name, Scheid, on the assumption that the Celtic theory of the name's origin holds true (“wood” or “forest”). The tree is also meant to stand for forestry, which has always been important in Scheid. The horn is Saint Cornelius’s attribute, thus representing the municipality’s and the chapel’s patron saint. During the 19th century, a small herd of sheep was kept in Scheid, the so-called “Cornelius sheep”, which served to support the chapel.

The arms were created by the Daun herald Friedbert Wisskirchen.

== Culture and sightseeing ==
Buildings:

- Near Hauptstraße 2 – wayside cross, post-Baroque slate pedestal cross, earlier half of the 19th century.
- Line of dragon's teeth along municipality's (and also Ormont’s and Hallschlag’s) western limit – several very well preserved sections of the second Siegfried Line, 1939.
- Former chapel's old altar.
