= Gönnersdorf, Vulkaneifel =

Gönnersdorf
- Municipality
- Coat of arms

- Location of Gönnersdorf within Vulkaneifel district
- Interactive map of Gönnersdorf
- Location within Germany Location within Rhineland-Palatinate
- Coordinates: 50°19′43″N 6°35′44″E
- Country: Germany
- State: Rhineland-Palatinate
- District: Vulkaneifel
- Municipal assoc.: Gerolstein

Government
  - Mayor (2019–24): Walter Schmidt

Area
  - Total: 5.19 km^{2} (2.00 sq mi)
- Elevation: 455 m (1,493 ft)

Population (2025-12-31)
  - Total: 469
  - Density: 90.4/km^{2} (234/sq mi)
- Time zone: UTC+01:00 (CET)
  - Summer (DST): UTC+02:00 (CEST)
- Postal codes: 54584
- Dialling codes: 06597
- Vehicle registration: DAU
- Website: www.goennersdorf-eifel.de

Gönnersdorf (German pronunciation: [ˈɡœnɐsdɔʁf]) is an Ortsgemeinde – a municipality belonging to a Verbandsgemeinde, a kind of collective municipality – in the Vulkaneifel district in Rhineland-Palatinate, Germany. It belongs to the Verbandsgemeinde of Gerolstein, whose seat is in the municipality of Gerolstein.

== Geography ==
The municipality lies in the Vulkaneifel, a part of the Eifel known for its volcanic history, geographical and geological features, and even ongoing activity today, including gases that sometimes well up from the earth.

== History ==
In 1136, Gönnersdorf had its first documentary mention as Guntersdorf in connection with a donation document from Bishop Alberos von Basel to the Lordship of Kerpen. Of course, the village may already have been much older. It is likely that Gönnersdorf arose as early as Frankish times, sometime from the eighth to the tenth centuries. There have been finds of early Frankish graves, and building works have also unearthed remnants of roads from Roman times.

The name's spelling has changed several times over the ages with such variants as Gondersdorf, Gundersdorf and Gundeszdorph. In early church books (1695−1798) of the parish of Lissendorf, it was written Junnersdorf. In the Middle Ages, Gönnersdorf belonged to the County of Blankenheim. Three local feudal estates were named in documents as Blankenheim holdings. Also held by these noblemen was high jurisdiction (blood court). In the 17th century, 17 estates were listed in one document. After the time of French rule, the Rhineland came into Prussian hands, and Gönnersdorf was assigned to the Bürgermeisterei (“Mayoralty”) of Birgel-Lissendorf. With municipal reform in 1970, the municipality of Gönnersdorf passed to the newly formed Verbandsgemeinde of Obere Kyll with its seat in Jünkerath.

== Politics ==
=== Municipal council ===
The council is made up of 12 council members, who were elected by majority vote at the municipal election held on 7 June 2009, and the honorary mayor as chairman.

=== Coat of arms ===
The German blazon reads: In Rot zwei silberne Balken, belegt mit oben drei und unten zwei schwarzen Kugeln.

The municipality's arms might in English heraldic language be described thus: Gules two bars argent, the upper charged with three and the lower with two roundels sable.

== Culture and sightseeing ==
Buildings:

- Catholic branch church, Kapellenstraße 1, biaxial aisleless church, apparently from about 1814.
- Hauptstraße/corner of Gartenstraße – warriors’ memorial 1914–1918, Archangel Michael 1920, expanded 1954.
