= List of protected heritage sites in Malmedy =

This table shows an overview of the protected heritage sites in the Walloon town Malmedy. This list is part of Belgium's national heritage.

Object	Year/architect	Town/section	Address	Coordinates	Number^{?}	Image
Royal Atheneum of Malmedy: old Saint-Pierre-et-Paul facades, roofs, interior of the monastery, vaulted ceilings, chapter house, pillared in the northeast corner ^{(nl)} ^{(fr)}		Malmedy	place du Châtelet	50.428028°N 6.027257°E	63049-CLT-0001-01	Koninklijk Atheneum van Malmedy: oude abdij van Saints-Pierre-et-Paul: gevels, daken, interieur van het klooster, gewelfde plafonds, kapittelzaal, zuilenhal in de noordoostelijke hoek
Chapel of the Resurrection ^{(nl)} ^{(fr)}		Malmedy	place du Pont Neuf	50.425221°N 6.033405°E	63049-CLT-0002-01	Kapel van Résurrection
Six of the beech trees in the forest Fagne de Longlou ^{(nl)} ^{(fr)}		Malmedy		50.485627°N 6.024951°E	63049-CLT-0003-01	Zes beuken van de open plek van het bos van Fagne de Longlou
obelisk ^{(nl)} ^{(fr)}		Malmedy		50.425623°N 6.029004°E	63049-CLT-0004-01	Obelisk
ravine ^{(nl)} ^{(fr)}		Malmedy		50.422657°N 6.042918°E	63049-CLT-0005-01	
Cathedral of Saints-Pierre-et-Paul et Saint-Quirin ^{(nl)} ^{(fr)}		Malmedy		50.426813°N 6.027824°E	63049-CLT-0006-01	Kathedraal Saints-Pierre-et-Paul et Saint-Quirin
Building: the former seat of the Fondation Cavens: facade, roof and side walls ^{(nl)} ^{(fr)}		Malmedy	Place de Rome	50.426196°N 6.025037°E	63049-CLT-0009-01	Gebouw: voormalige zetel van de Fondation Cavens: gevel, daken en zijgevels
Church of Saint-Aubin and the church, its cemetery and surrounding wall ^{(nl)} ^{(fr)}		Malmedy		50.391774°N 6.012065°E	63049-CLT-0010-01	Kerk Saint-Aubin en het ensemble van de kerk, de begraafplaats er omheen en de omliggende muur
House "Maraite" ^{(nl)} ^{(fr)}		Malmedy	n°11	50.390593°N 6.008122°E	63049-CLT-0011-01	Huis "Maraite"
Ancient oak called "Lu Tchâne à Tchâne" ^{(nl)} ^{(fr)}		Malmedy		50.481554°N 6.078875°E	63049-CLT-0012-01	Eeuwenoude eik genaamd "Lu Tchâne à Tchâne"
Chapel of Saint Hubert ^{(nl)} ^{(fr)}		Malmedy		50.366415°N 6.037969°E	63049-CLT-0013-01	
Chapel of Saint Hubert and surroundings ^{(nl)} ^{(fr)}		Malmedy		50.366565°N 6.037591°E	63049-CLT-0014-01	
Farmhouse: half-timbered gables ^{(nl)} ^{(fr)}		Malmedy	place du Hameau, Xhoffraix	50.459207°N 6.068416°E	63049-CLT-0015-01	
Massif of the juniper berries in a place called "Les Planeresses" ^{(nl)} ^{(fr)}		Malmedy		50.480997°N 6.080640°E	63049-CLT-0016-01	Massief van de jeneverbessen op een plek genaamd "Les Planeresses"
The hermitage of Bernister and its surroundings ^{(nl)} ^{(fr)}		Malmedy		50.441310°N 6.024704°E	63049-CLT-0018-01	
Chapel of Saint-François or Capucins ^{(nl)} ^{(fr)}		Malmedy	ruelle des Capucins	50.424752°N 6.030526°E	63049-CLT-0019-01	Kapel van de Capucins ou Saint-François
The rocks of Warche ^{(nl)} ^{(fr)}		Malmedy		50.387717°N 5.984576°E	63049-CLT-0020-01	De rotsen van Warche en instelling beschermingszone
House: Maison Villers and walls and roofs, and the gardens ^{(nl)} ^{(fr)}		Malmedy	Cheminrue n° 11	50.425064°N 6.027795°E	63049-CLT-0021-01	Huis: Maison Villers (totaal) en aanbouw (gevels en daken) en het ensemble van de gebouwen en de tuin
Notre Dame des Malades chapel, formerly Sainte-Marie-Madeleine, facades and roofs ^{(nl)} ^{(fr)}		Malmedy	rue de la Chapelle	50.425378°N 6.021877°E	63049-CLT-0024-01	Kapel Notre Dame des Malades, voorheen Sainte-Marie-Madeleine, gevels en daken
Station annotinum Lycopodium L. van Wolfbusch, along the road to Ligneuville ^{(nl)} ^{(fr)}		Malmedy		50.373385°N 6.091116°E	63049-CLT-0026-01	
Facades and roofs of the old Hall of Gretedar ^{(nl)} ^{(fr)}		Malmedy	rue de Grétedar n° 8	50.426250°N 6.030845°E	63049-CLT-0028-01	Gevels en daken van de oude halle de Grétedar, uitgezonderd de recente aanbouw in de noordoostelijke hoek, instelling beschermingszone
Fischbach Chapel ^{(nl)} ^{(fr)}		Malmedy		50.518242°N 6.063138°E	63049-CLT-0030-01	Kapel Fischbach
Historic area of the municipalities Jalhay, Baelen, Waimes and Malmedy ^{(nl)} ^{(fr)}		Malmedy		50.525604°N 6.044209°E	63049-CLT-0031-01	
Reinhardstein Castle and the valley of the Warche ^{(nl)} ^{(fr)}		Malmedy		50.447729°N 6.079665°E	63049-CLT-0032-01	Ensemble van kasteel van Reinhardstein en de vallei van de Warche
Villers house, except the rear and extension to the courtyard ^{(nl)} ^{(fr)}		Malmedy		50.425064°N 6.027795°E	63049-PEX-0001-01	

== See also ==
- List of protected heritage sites in Liège (province)
- Malmedy
