= Birgel =

- Municipality
- Coat of arms

- Location of Birgel within Vulkaneifel district
- Interactive map of Birgel
- Location within Germany Location within Rhineland-Palatinate
- Coordinates: 50°19′20″N 6°37′20″E
- Country: Germany
- State: Rhineland-Palatinate
- District: Vulkaneifel
- Municipal assoc.: Gerolstein

Government
  - Mayor (2019–24): Elmar Malburg

Area
  - Total: 6.52 km^{2} (2.52 sq mi)
- Elevation: 420 m (1,380 ft)

Population (2025-12-31)
  - Total: 430
  - Density: 66/km^{2} (170/sq mi)
- Time zone: UTC+01:00 (CET)
  - Summer (DST): UTC+02:00 (CEST)
- Postal codes: 54587
- Dialling codes: 06597
- Vehicle registration: DAU
- Website: www.birgel-eifel.de

Birgel is an Ortsgemeinde – a municipality belonging to a Verbandsgemeinde, a kind of collective municipality – in the Vulkaneifel district in Rhineland-Palatinate, Germany. It belongs to the Verbandsgemeinde of Gerolstein, whose seat is in the municipality of Gerolstein.

== Geography ==
=== Location ===
The municipality lies in the Eifel on the upper Kyll, halfway between Trier and Cologne. It is linked to the outside world by Bundesstraße 421 and the Cologne-Trier railway (Lissendorf station).

=== Geology ===
The municipality belongs to the Kalkeifel (“Limestone Eifel”) and lies on the southern edge of the Dollendorf Limestone Basin (Dollendorfer Kalkmulde). The elevation ranges from about 400 m above sea level on the Kyll at Crumpsmühle to about 526 m above sea level at the Hirzberg (mountain).

Geologically, three formations characterize the municipality. The outliers of the Middle Devonian limestone basin in the north, the bunter in the middle and the east and the sediments of the Kyll in the west.

Arising from this are the great amounts of groundwater found here, which supply not only Birgel but also other municipalities in the Verbandsgemeinde of Obere Kyll with drinking water.

=== Geological and natural peculiarities ===
- Bunter crags in the Birgeler Hardt, protected as a natural monument since 1948
- Kalkofen, literally “Limekiln”, a former limestone quarry on the Hirschberg
- Butterley, dolomite crags on the Hirschberg, protected as a natural monument since 1938
- Kyll valley floodplain
- Wiesbach with Wiesbachmoor (moor) and Arnikawiese (meadow)
- Burgberg with high Celtic settlement and former sand quarries

== History ==
In 1222, Birgel had its first documentary mention in the commentary of Prüm Abbey’s directory of holdings, the Prümer Urbar. In 1457, Gerhard von Loen, Count of Blankenheim, acquired half an estate in Birgel. As well, the Lords of Mirbach had ownership rights in the village, as they styled themselves “Lords of Birgel” in one document from the 16th century. In that same century, Birgel ended up in the power of the County of Gerolstein. The Elector of Trier owned his own fief in the village. The Electoral-Trier Amtmann (Amt official) at Daun received annuities from Birgel. Foremost among the rulers, however, remained the Counts of Blankenheim-Manderscheid-Gerolstein. On the occasion of an agreement in 1547, it was decided that Birgel belonged in Gerolstein's hands. In the 19th century, Birgel became the seat of the Lissendorf-Birgel Amt administration. The administration bore the title “Amt Lissendorf in Birgel”. In the course of administrative restructuring, the formerly self-administering Ämter of Stadtkyll and Lissendorf-Birgel were dissolved, and Birgel was grouped into the newly formed Verbandsgemeinde of Obere Kyll with its seat at Jünkerath.

In 2006, the municipality of Birgel received first place in the contest Unser Dorf hat Zukunft (“Our Village Has a Future”) in the Vulkaneifel (then still Daun) district's main class.

=== Population development ===
In 1960, Birgel had roughly 520 inhabitants. The population peaked in 1990 at about 590 inhabitants. Currently, roughly 540 people have a primary or secondary residence in Birgel.

== Politics ==
=== Municipal council ===
The council is made up of 8 council members, who were elected by majority vote at the municipal election held on 7 June 2009, and the honorary mayor as chairman.

=== Coat of arms ===
The German blazon reads: In grün über silbernem Dreiberg ein silberner Hirschkopf im Visier mit silbernem Hochkreuz zwischen den Geweihstangen.

The municipality's arms might in English heraldic language be described thus: Vert in base a mount of three upon which a stag's head caboshed, between his attires a Latin cross, all argent.

The “mount of three” – a charge called a Dreiberg in German heraldry – is canting for the municipality's name, as “Birgel” (formerly called Birglin or Birgle) is a diminutive of the German word Berg, meaning “mountain”. The stag's head and the cross between his antlers (“attires”) form one of Saint Hubert's attributes, thus making it a reference to the local chapel's patron.

== Culture and sightseeing ==
Buildings:

- Kapelle St. Hubertus (Saint Hubert's Chapel), an aisleless church from the early 16th century
- Butterley (crags)
- Hubertuseiche (Saint Hubert's Oak)
- Historical watermill with mill museum
- Bahnhofstraße 12 – a Quereinhaus (a combination residential and commercial house divided for these two purposes down the middle, perpendicularly to the street) from 1882
- Dorfstraße 1 – corner house from 1808, more recent commercial building, old cobblestones in the yard

== Economy and infrastructure ==
=== Public institutions ===
- Community centre
- Fire station
- Chapel consecrated to Saint Hubert
- Graveyard with consecration hall
- Sporting ground with barbecue pavilion and multipurpose hall
- Nature playground with football pitch (dedicated in 2006)
