= Cwarmê =

Carnival in Malmedy, Belgium

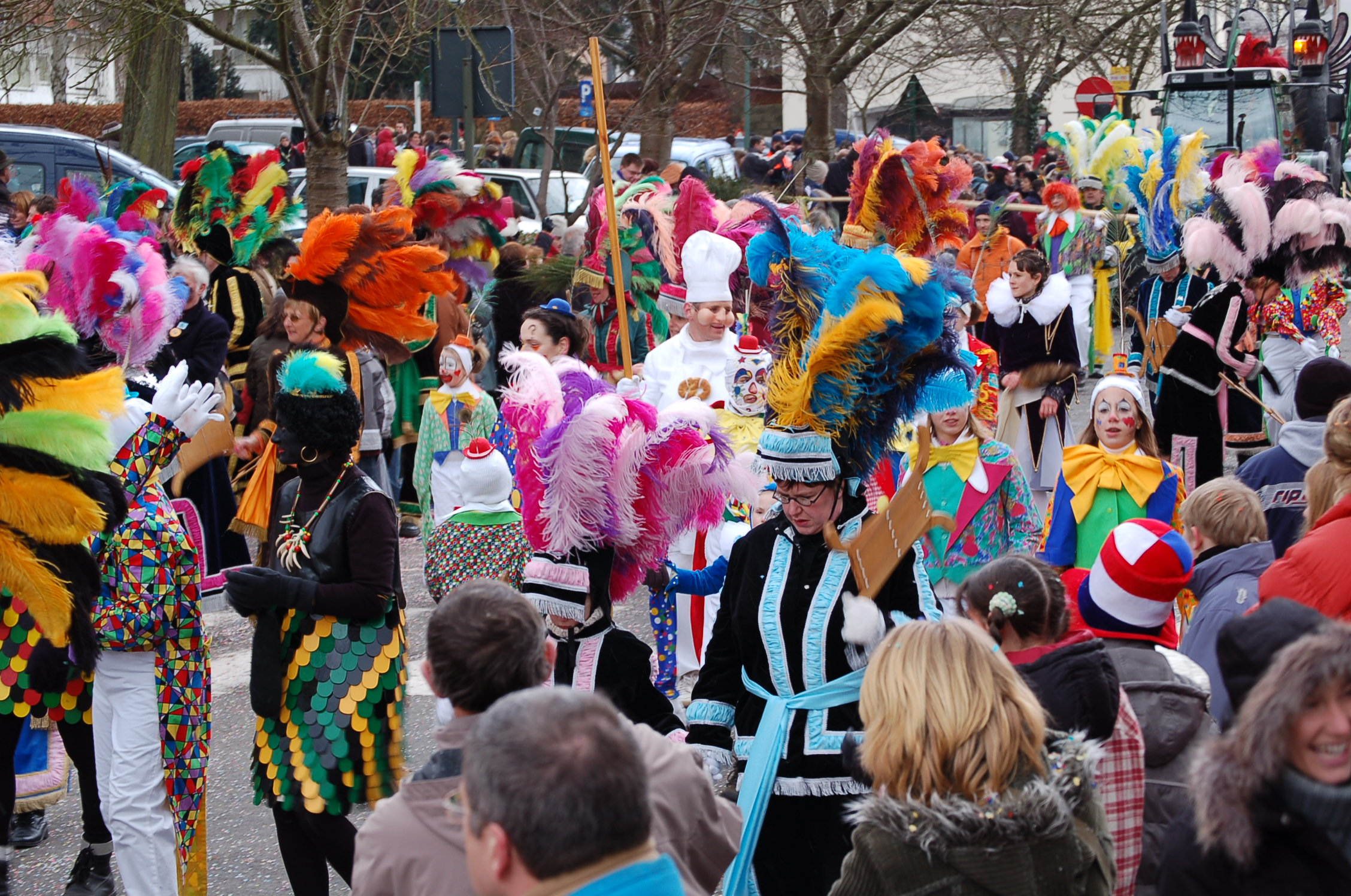
- The traditional carnival parade
- Status: Active
- Genre: Carnival
- Frequency: Annual
- Location: Malmedy
- Country: Belgium

The Cwarmê is a carnival which takes place in the city of Malmedy, Belgium. It lasts four days and is listed as intangible heritage of the French Community of Belgium. The carnival begins at midnight on the Friday before Lent and lasts until midnight on Shrove Tuesday.

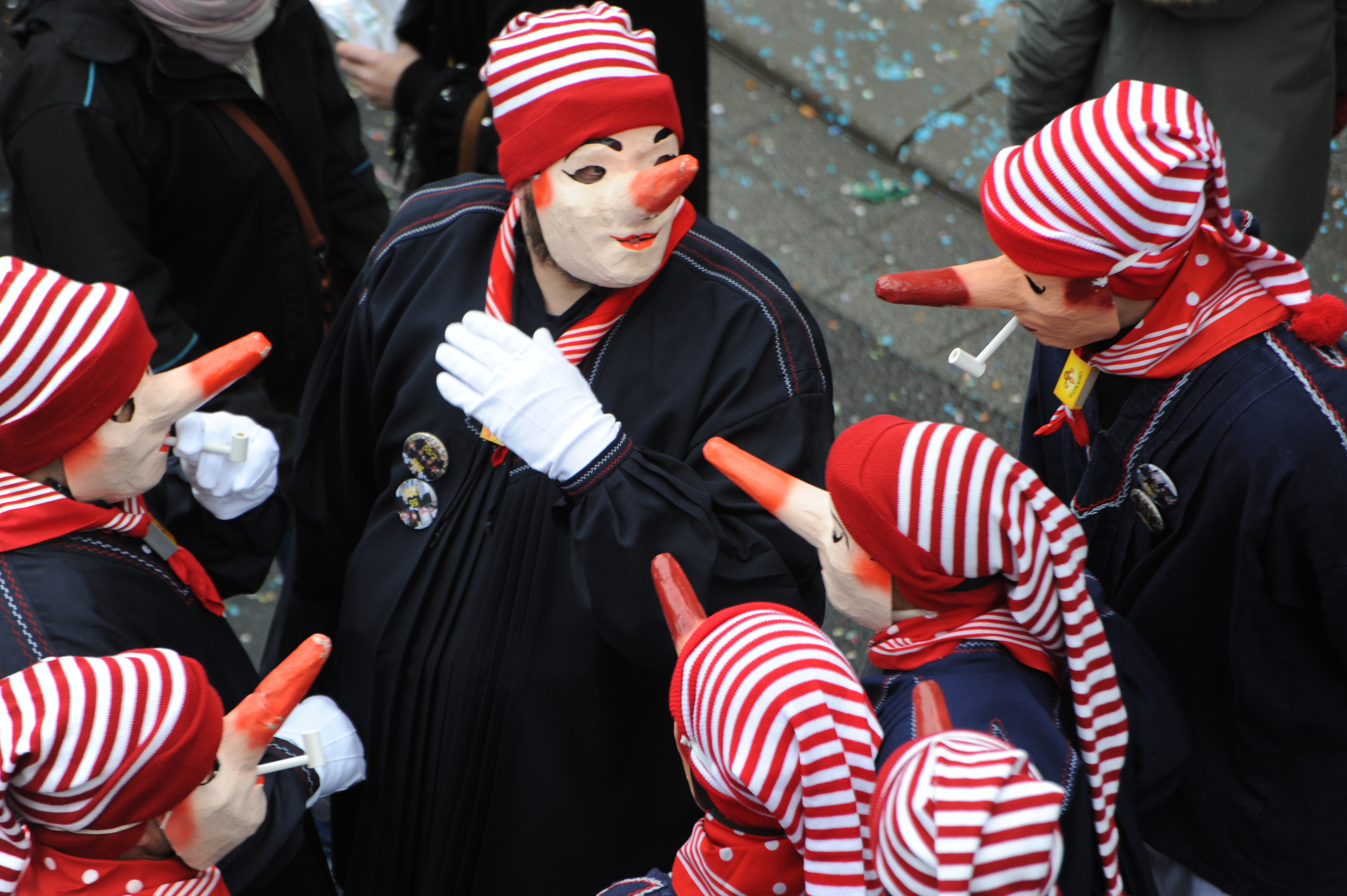
Long-Né and Longuès-Brèsses

== History and origins ==
The oldest record of the carnival of Malmedy is in a document from 1459 that mentions the Quarmae (Cwarmê), but it is thought that it was already celebrated much earlier.

The word Cwarmê is used to talk about the carnival period, which lasts four days in the city in Malmedy. Those days are called in Walloon Grandès haguètes (tall haguètes) by opposition to the P'titès haguètes (small haguètes) or four jeudi gras that precede the carnival.

The first written evidence of a prohibition of the carnival dates from 1695, when the principality of Malmedy was governed by prince-abbots. The local authorities feared that this celebration could encourage public disorder since it was assimilated to pagan rituals. Other prohibitions were issued in the 18th and 19th centuries, but the inhabitants circumvented these interdictions. In the 20th century the carnival was prohibited on three occasions: during the two world wars and in 1962 during a smallpox epidemic. However, despite these numerous obstacles, the Malmédiens succeeded in saving their tradition which is still going on today.

The name of the Malmedy carnival originates in the Latin word quadragesima, shortened to quaresima, which means forty. Forty represents the number of days that separates Ash Wednesday from Holy Week. The word quaresima grew and turned into the French word Carême and the Walloon word Cwarmê.

In a lot of places on the planet, people celebrate Mardi Gras, called after the enormous quantity of food absorb before the deprivation of Lent. It is the definitive day of carnival. In Malmedy, Mardi Gras is the last day of the carnival. This is why the date of Easter determines when the Cwarmê will be celebrated each year.

The Cwarmê requires months of preparation: the making of costumes, the writing of the roles, the preparation of the vehicles for the parade, and so forth.
