= Hallschlag =

- Municipality
- Coat of arms

- Location of Hallschlag within Vulkaneifel district
- Interactive map of Hallschlag
- Location within Germany Location within Rhineland-Palatinate
- Coordinates: 50°21′13″N 6°26′18″E
- Country: Germany
- State: Rhineland-Palatinate
- District: Vulkaneifel
- Municipal assoc.: Gerolstein

Government
  - Mayor (2019–24): Dirk Weicker

Area
  - Total: 12.74 km^{2} (4.92 sq mi)
- Elevation: 480 m (1,570 ft)

Population (2025-12-31)
  - Total: 456
  - Density: 35.8/km^{2} (92.7/sq mi)
- Time zone: UTC+01:00 (CET)
  - Summer (DST): UTC+02:00 (CEST)
- Postal codes: 54611
- Dialling codes: 06557
- Vehicle registration: DAU
- Website: www.hallschlag.de

Hallschlag is a village in the Vulkaneifel district in Rhineland-Palatinate, Germany. The municipality (German: Ortsgemeinde) belongs to the Verbandsgemeinde of Obere Kyll, whose seat is in the municipality of Gerolstein.

== Geography ==
The municipality lies between 490 metres (1,610 ft) and 640 metres (2,100 ft) above sea level on the boundary between the Vulkaneifel – a part of the Eifel known for its volcanic history, geographical and geological features, and even ongoing activity today, including gases that sometimes well up from the earth – and the Rheinisches Schiefergebirge (Rhenish Slate Mountains), on the edge of the Schnee-Eifel. Hallschlag lies in a hollow and is nestled in the charming countryside of the Middle Eifel. It belongs to the recreational region of Oberes Kylltal (“Upper Kyll Valley”). Three kilometres away to the west runs the Belgian border. The municipal area borders in the west, north and east on North Rhine-Westphalia.

== History ==
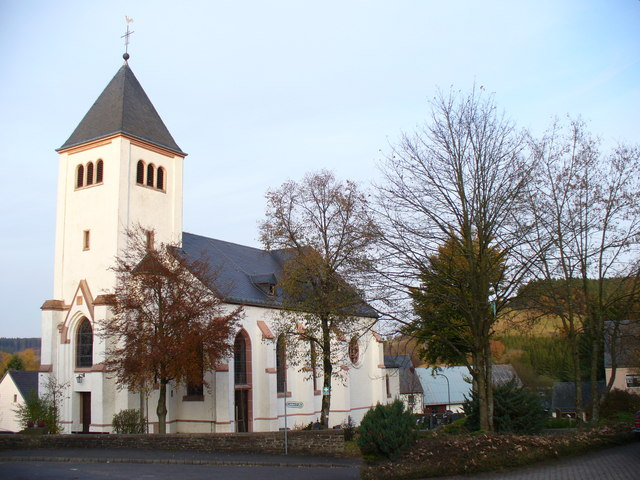
Parish church

In 1322, Hallschlag had its first documentary mention. Hallschlag belonged then to the Lordship of Kronenburg. In the 15th century, the village found its way into Manderscheid-Schleiden hands. Towards the end of the 17th century, Hallschlag belonged, along with Kronenburg, to the Blankenheim line of the County of Manderscheid-Blankenheim. The village was raised to parish in the early 19th century. In the Second World War, 80% of Hallschlag was destroyed.

== Politics ==
=== Municipal council ===
The council is made up of 12 council members, who were elected by majority vote at the municipal election held on 7 June 2009, and the honorary mayor as chairman.

=== Coat of arms ===
The German blazon reads: Unter rotem Schildhaupt mit drei goldenen Kugeln, in Silber ein blauer, schrägrechter Wellenbalken.

The municipality’s arms might in English heraldic language be described thus: Argent a bend wavy azure, in a chief gules three bezants.

== Culture and sightseeing ==
- Pilgrimage cross of the Brotherhood of Saint Matthew on the road to Ormont, about 100 m behind the former railway bridge.
- Line of tank traps on the western limits of the municipalities of Hallschlag, Ormont and Scheid, remnants of the former Siegfried Line (Westwall in German).
- Saint Nicholas’s Catholic Parish Church (Pfarrkirche St. Nikolaus), Trierer Straße 1, Gothic Revival building from 1867, architect V. Statz.

== Economy and infrastructure ==
=== Transport ===
Through the municipality runs Bundesstraße 421.

=== Former Espagit munitions factory ===
Within Hallschlag’s municipal limits, near Kehr, screened off from the outside, are the lands of the Espagit poison gas and munitions plant. Between 1915 and 1920, roughly two thousand people were employed here, until eventually, in May 1920, the factory exploded. As Franz Albert Heinen, local editor of the Kölner Stadtanzeiger, showed in his book (see Further reading, below), the former factory lands stand even today as an immense environmental danger, because undiscovered explosive devices and gas grenades, along with assorted other poisons, are still lurking in the ground.

In the early 1990s, the Ministry of the Interior in Mainz, which is responsible for munitions removal, decided on the concept of only superficially clearing munitions from the factory’s highly contaminated former production area of about 13 hectares. Afterwards, the lands were covered in landfill and secured behind a chainlink fence to ensure the long-term prevention of contact between the affected ground and human beings. The contaminated leachate is gathered in the drainage system and then handled at a water decontamination facility.
