= Xhoffraix =

Village in Malmedy, Belgium

Coordinates: 50°28′N 6°04′E

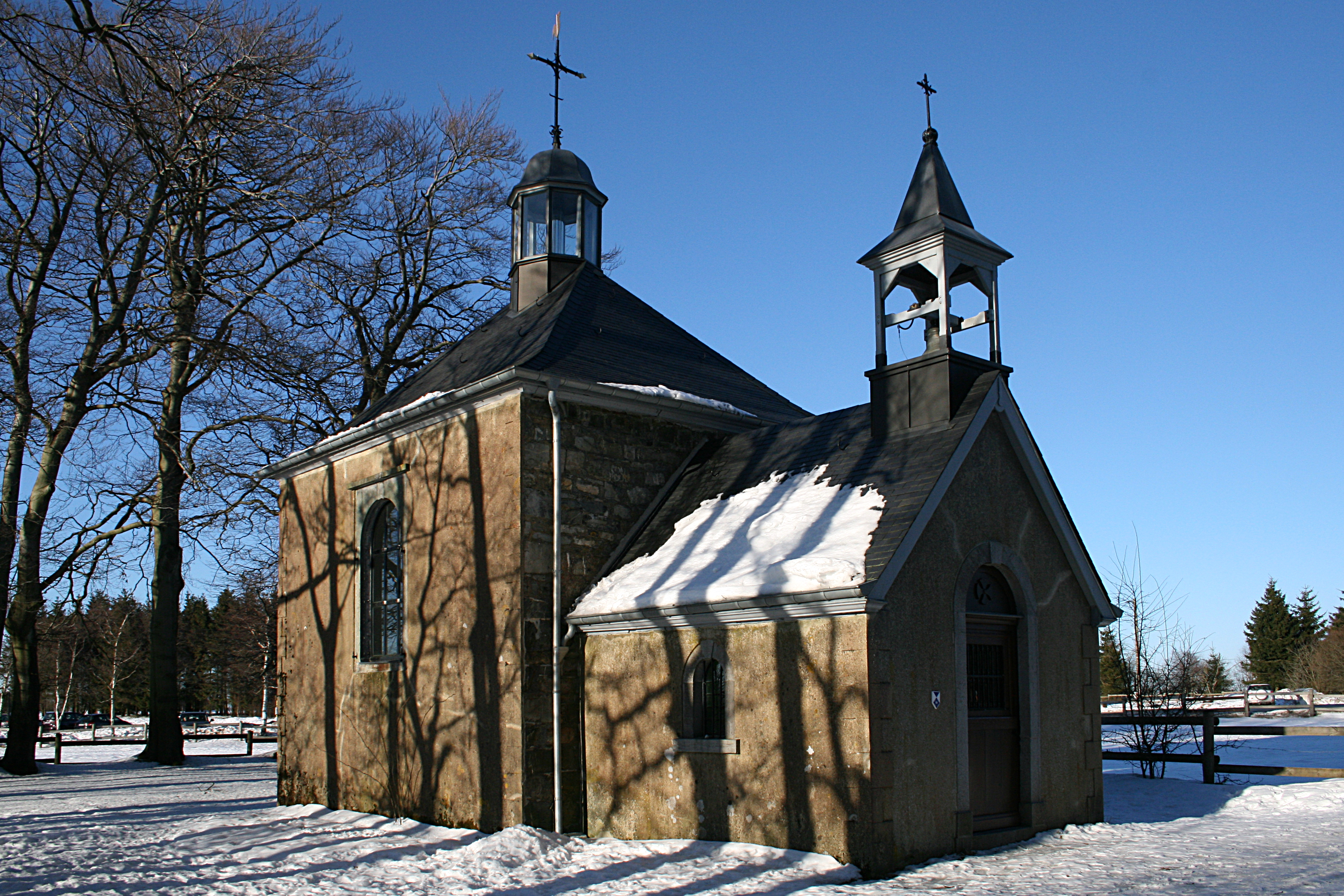
The Chapel Fischbach in Xhoffraix

Xhoffraix ([French pronunciation: [(h)ɔfʀɛ] (Note: Jean-Marie Pierret, Phonétique historique du français et notions de phonétique générale, Louvahin-la-Neuve, Peeters, 1994, p. 106. (French language pronunciation))]; Walloon: Xhofrai [Hofrê or Hyofrê (Note: Jean Haust, Enquête dialectale sur la toponymie wallonne, Vaillant-Carmanne, Liège, 1940-1941, p. 1.) pronounced [hɔ.'fʀɛː] ]) is a village of Wallonia in the municipality of Malmedy, district of Bévercé, located in the province of Liège, Belgium.

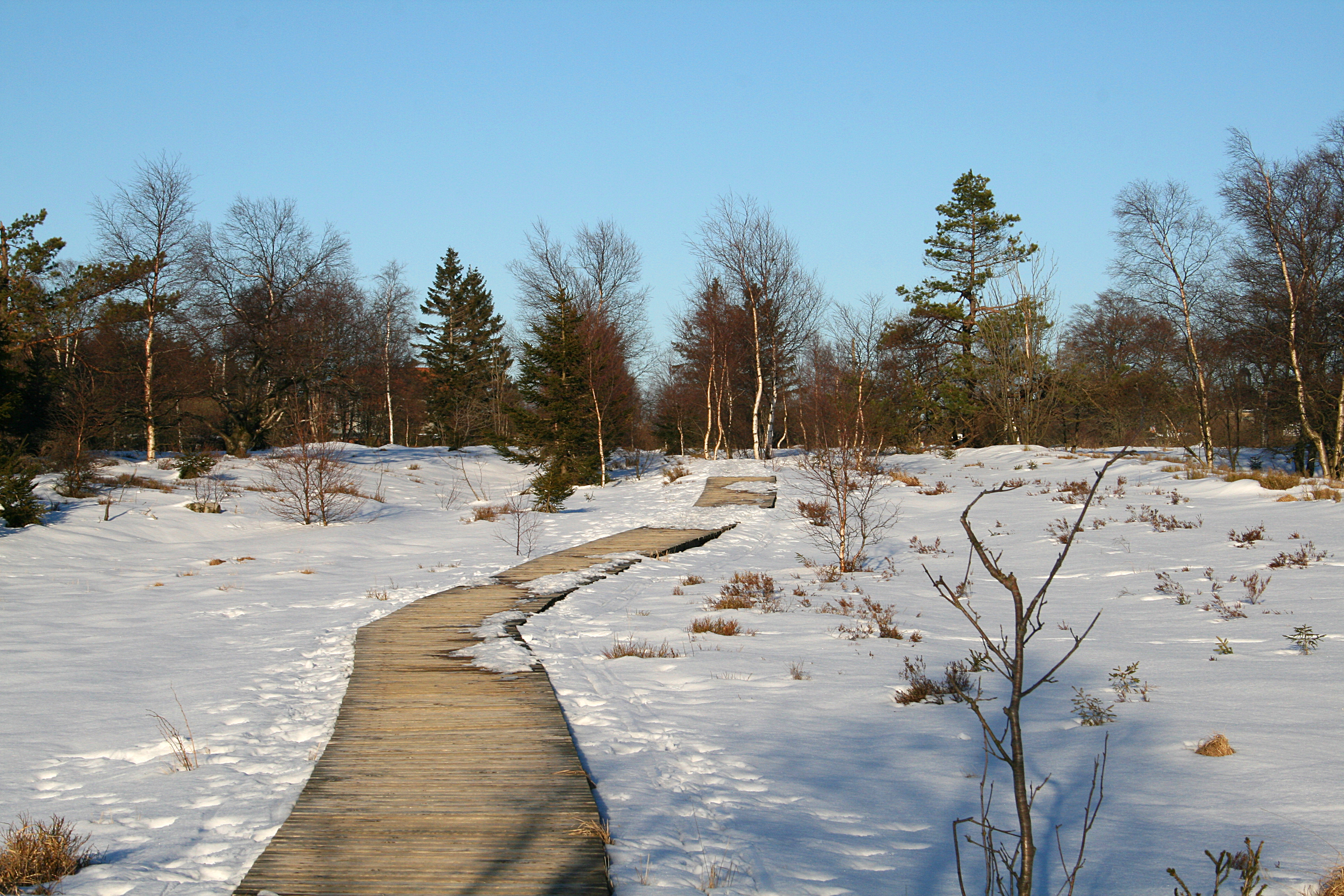
Winter in the High Fens.

Xhoffraix is located in the foothills of the High Fens region, along a national road connecting Malmedy to Signal de Botrange, the highest point in Belgium.
