= Malmedy =

City in Liège Province, Wallonia, Belgium

Malmedy Måmdiy (Walloon)
- Municipality
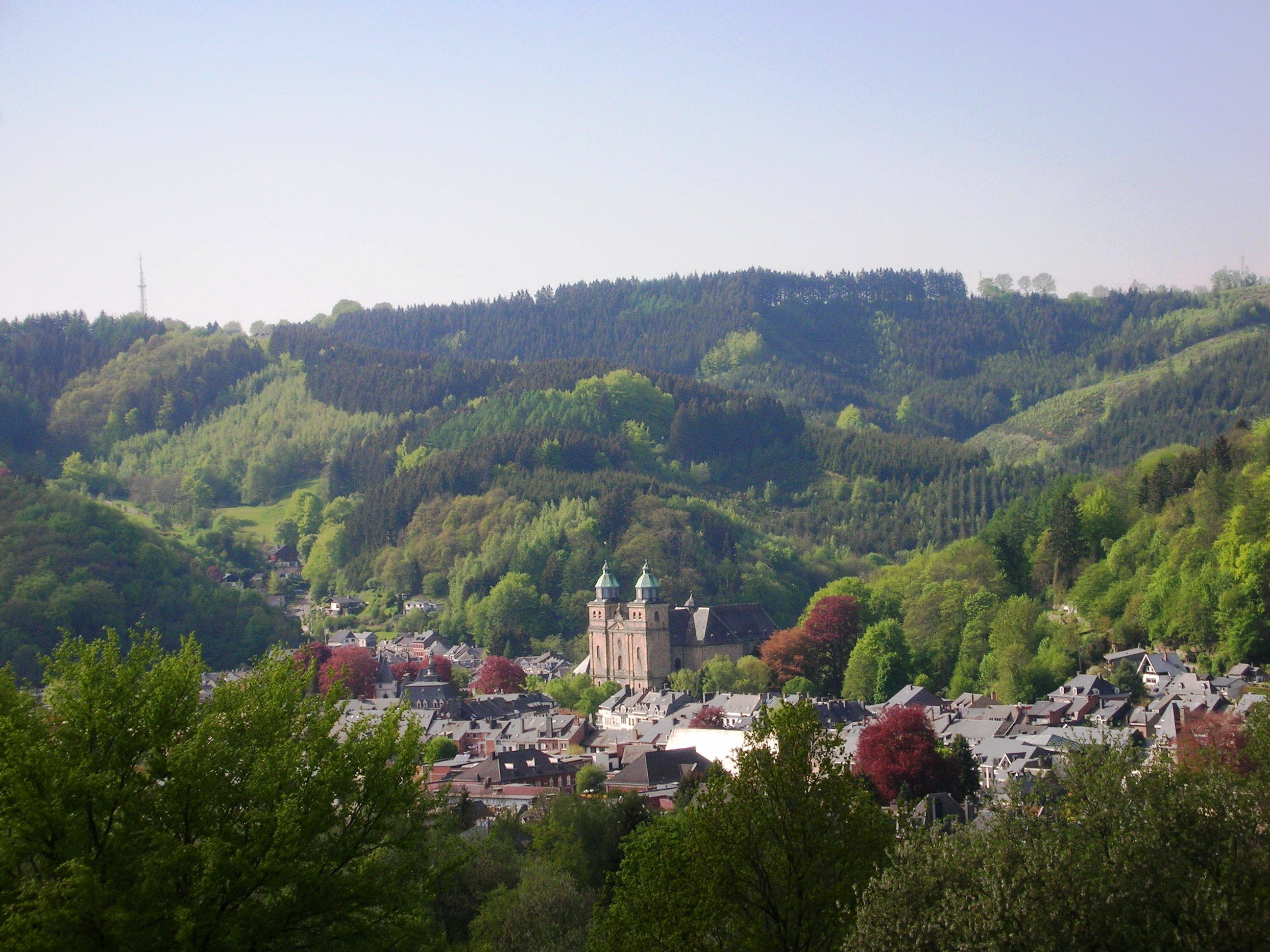
- Malmedy from the south

- Flag Coat of arms

- Location of Malmedy in Liège Province
- Interactive map of Malmedy
- Location in Belgium
- Coordinates: 50°25′N 06°01′E
- Country: Belgium
- Community: French Community
- Region: Wallonia
- Province: Liège
- Arrondissement: Verviers

Government
  - Mayor: Jean-Paul Bastin (CdH, Alternative)
  - Governing party: Alternative - PS Plus

Area
  - Total: 100.37 km^{2} (38.75 sq mi)

Population (2018-01-01)
  - Total: 12,654
  - Density: 126.07/km^{2} (326.53/sq mi)
- Postal codes: 4960
- NIS code: 63049
- Area codes: 080
- Website: http://malmedy.be

Malmedy (French pronunciation: [malmədi]; German: Malmedy [ˈmalmedi], historically also Malmünd [ˈmalmʏnt]; Walloon: Måmdiy) is a city and municipality of Wallonia located in the province of Liège, Belgium. On January 1, 2018, Malmedy had a total population of 12,654. The total area is 99.96 km^{2} which gives a population density of 127 inhabitants per km^{2}. The municipality consists of the following districts: Bellevaux-Ligneuville, Bévercé (including the hamlets of Baugnez and Xhoffraix), and Malmedy.

Under the complex administrative structures of Belgium, which has separate structures for territorial administration and for language community rights, Malmedy is part of Wallonia and of the French Community of Belgium. But since it has a German-speaking minority, it is one of Belgium's municipalities with language facilities (or "municipalities with facilities"). Malmedy and Waimes are the two municipalities in the French-speaking part of Wallonia with facilities for German speakers. The population of Malmedy is approximately 95% French speakers and 5% German speakers. The variety of German spoken is Moselle Franconian.

Despite being mainly in neighboring Stavelot, a portion of the Circuit de Spa-Francorchamps motor-racing circuit is located in Malmedy.

== History ==
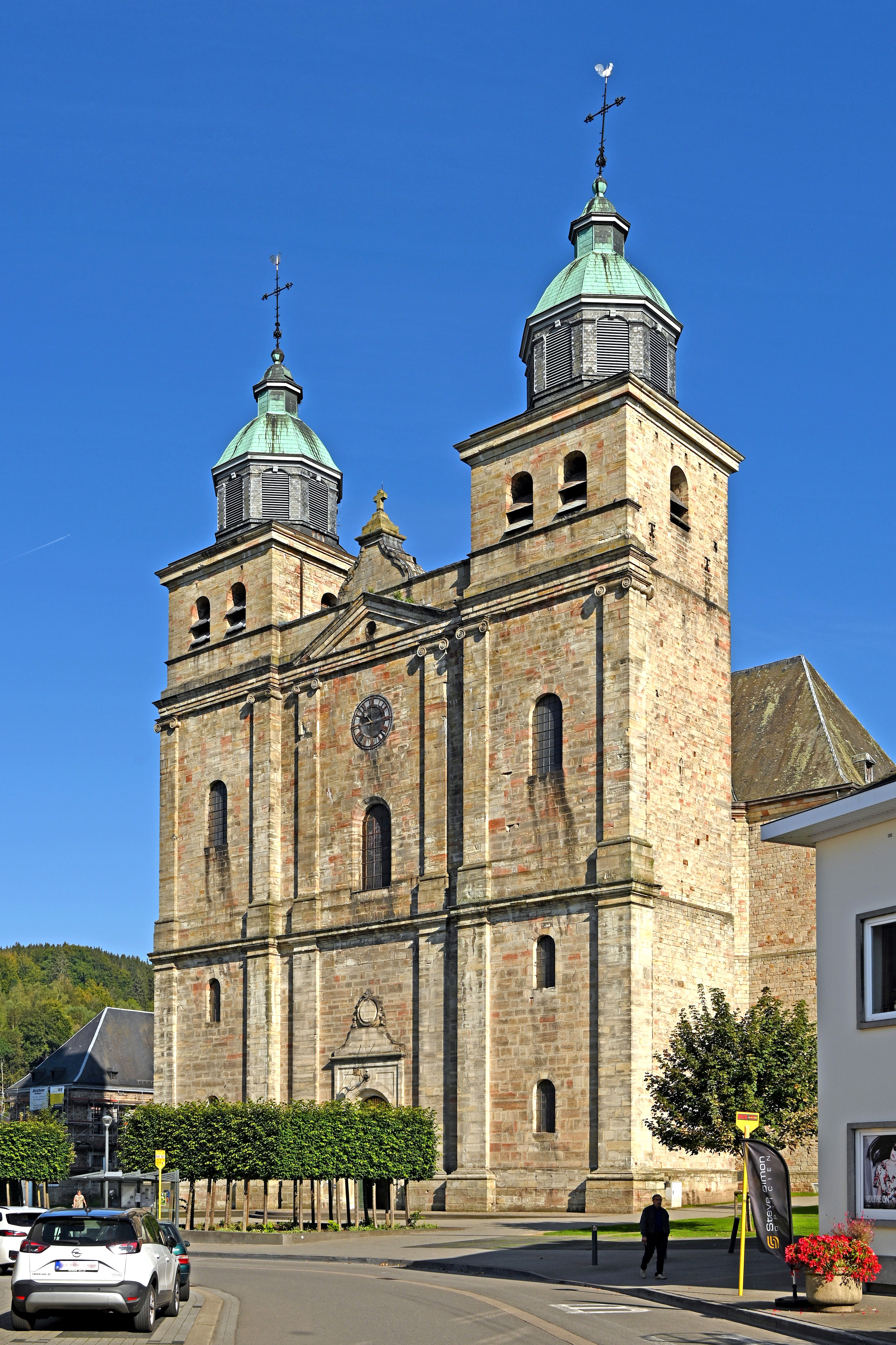
Cathedral of Malmedy

The name of "Malmedy" comes from the Latin sentence "A malo mundarum", meaning "purifying from evil". The name originated due to regular flooding in the past from the Warche river, which passes through the town.

The city was founded in 648 by Saint Remacle, Abbot of Solignac Abbey in France. He had established his Benedictine Monastery in Malmedy. Between this date and 1794, the history of Malmedy is linked to the Princely Abbey of Stavelot-Malmedy, a clerical microstate ruled by a prince-abbot.

For 1,146 years, Malmedy and Stavelot together formed the Principality of Stavelot-Malmedy. Seventy-seven successive prince abbots of the Germanic Holy Roman Empire and the County of Logne led the state. However, a rivalry grew up rapidly between the two towns, because Saint Remacle decided to choose Stavelot as the main city of the Principality.

In the 16th century, a significant number of industries appeared in the area of Malmedy: cloth, leather and gunpowder production. In the 17th century, Stavelot-Malmedy became the most important tannery centre in Europe. But the main industry in Malmedy was the papermaking industry. It brought considerable wealth to the town.

In 1795, during the French Revolution and the Liège Revolution, the Principality of Stavelot-Malmedy was annexed by France. Malmedy became a lower prefecture in the "département de l'Ourthe".

After the defeat of Napoléon in 1815, during the Congress of Vienna, the decision was made to link Malmedy, a Romance and Walloon town, to Prussia, a Germanic state. This special situation of Malmedy caused a lot of problems in the first 50 years. However, the inhabitants were free to speak French as they pleased, including in the day-to-day running of the town council.

This situation changed following the Franco-German War of 1870 and the foundation of the German Empire. For the Prussian-German administration, Malmedy suffered a double disadvantage as it was both francophone and Catholic. From this moment, the government under Chancellor Bismarck implemented a policy of Germanisation: In schools, lessons in French were banned and the German language was mandatory. The priests were not allowed to preach any longer in French.

During the First World War, the population of Malmedy fought in German uniforms. But when the defeat of the German Empire was proclaimed, Malmedy and the other eastern cantons were annexed to Belgium by virtue of the Treaty of Versailles. Malmedy and neighbouring Eupen (Eupen-Malmedy territory) were subject to a plebiscite to determine whether the region would be separated from Germany and annexed to Belgium. The plebiscite ballots required registration of the names and addresses of the pro-German voters (the others were assumed to be pro-Belgian), and the German-speaking population of Eupen and Malmedy were intimidated. Both were formally annexed in 1920 and were administered under a special transitional government until they were incorporated into the province of Liège in 1925.

The main church of Malmedy that was built in 1777 served as a cathedral from 1920 to 1925.

Some older sources spell the city's name "Malmédy" - the accent was added when being part of Prussia and Germany - but its official website lists it as "Malmedy", with no accent. Along with the neighbouring city of Eupen, it formed a German-speaking area of Belgium. During this period, a few undaunted individuals went as far as founding a "Walloon Club" in 1897, and this still exists today.

Between 1940 and 1945, Malmedy was re-incorporated into Germany. In 1944, during the Battle of the Bulge, the area was the site of the Malmedy massacre, where 84 American prisoners of war were killed by Nazi SS troops under the command of Joachim Peiper. This was one of a number of such massacres of prisoners and Belgian civilians which took place in the Malmedy area.

On 21 December 1944 the town, which was then held by US troops, was attacked by German forces (under the command of Otto Skorzeny), who were repelled. On 23, 24 and 25 December 1944 the city was bombed repeatedly by the United States Army Air Forces in a series of friendly fire incidents. Approximately 200 civilians were killed in the attacks, while the number of American casualties has never been revealed by the United States Department of Defense.

Today, the people of Malmedy are a mix of Romance and German cultures. Despite all the changes, the Malmedians seem to have preserved the qualities recognised by an 18th-century English chemist when he stated, "The inhabitants of Malmedy are honest, skillful, opulent, gracious, sociable and courteous towards foreigners."

Nowadays, the population consists of approximately 12,000 inhabitants. There are seven male choirs, two song groups, four brass bands, an accordion club, a mandolin club and a very active music academy.

== Geography ==
=== Climate ===
Malmedy has an oceanic climate with continental influences due to its inland position and higher elevation. Winter can see ice days, strong air frosts and snowfall. Malmedy's high precipitation is commonly affecting the nearby Spa-Francorchamps race track, known for its treacherous weather conditions.

Climate data for Malmedy (1981–2010 normals; sunshine 1984–2013)
Month	Jan	Feb	Mar	Apr	May	Jun	Jul	Aug	Sep	Oct	Nov	Dec	Year
Mean daily maximum °C (°F)	3.0 (37.4)	4.2 (39.6)	7.9 (46.2)	11.8 (53.2)	16.2 (61.2)	18.9 (66.0)	21.1 (70.0)	20.8 (69.4)	17.1 (62.8)	12.6 (54.7)	6.9 (44.4)	3.7 (38.7)	12.1 (53.8)
Daily mean °C (°F)	0.5 (32.9)	0.8 (33.4)	4.1 (39.4)	7.0 (44.6)	11.3 (52.3)	14.0 (57.2)	16.2 (61.2)	15.8 (60.4)	12.5 (54.5)	8.9 (48.0)	4.3 (39.7)	1.3 (34.3)	8.1 (46.6)
Mean daily minimum °C (°F)	−2.1 (28.2)	−2.4 (27.7)	0.2 (32.4)	2.3 (36.1)	6.4 (43.5)	9.2 (48.6)	11.2 (52.2)	10.7 (51.3)	8.0 (46.4)	5.2 (41.4)	1.7 (35.1)	−1.0 (30.2)	4.2 (39.6)
Average precipitation mm (inches)	123.6 (4.87)	104.1 (4.10)	109.3 (4.30)	79.5 (3.13)	90.1 (3.55)	97.4 (3.83)	103.9 (4.09)	97.6 (3.84)	100.7 (3.96)	102.3 (4.03)	109.5 (4.31)	128.9 (5.07)	1,246.7 (49.08)
Average precipitation days	15.3	13.3	15.1	11.9	12.6	12.9	12.7	11.9	12.2	12.7	15.0	15.9	161.4
Mean monthly sunshine hours	44	68	111	158	184	179	195	186	132	100	47	34	1,437
Source: Royal Meteorological Institute

=== Seismic risks ===
In the provinces of Liège, Limburg and Hainaut, seismic activity is higher than in the rest of the country. Malmedy is one of the communes in zone 2, which is the zone most susceptible to earthquakes in Belgium.

The earthquake of 1692, which touched the area of Verviers, as well as being responsible for landslides, took place in the valley of Warche east of Bévercé (in the south of the junction with the brook of Trô Maret). The remains and evidence, of these landslides, which affected the Conglomerate of Malmedy were discovered in March 2015. Ground surveys, subsequently, led to revisions of the local geological map.

== Languages ==
Malmedy is a predominantly French-speaking city, with almost all of its population having French as their mother tongue.

However, due to its geographical position and history, Malmedy attaches great importance to the German language; although few, some people have German as their mother tongue.

Walloon is the historical language of the city, however few people speak it today and it is in constant decline against French. Most of the time, they are elderly people who have mastered this language. But Walloon remains present in the folk songs of the Cwarmê (Carnival).

== Folklore ==
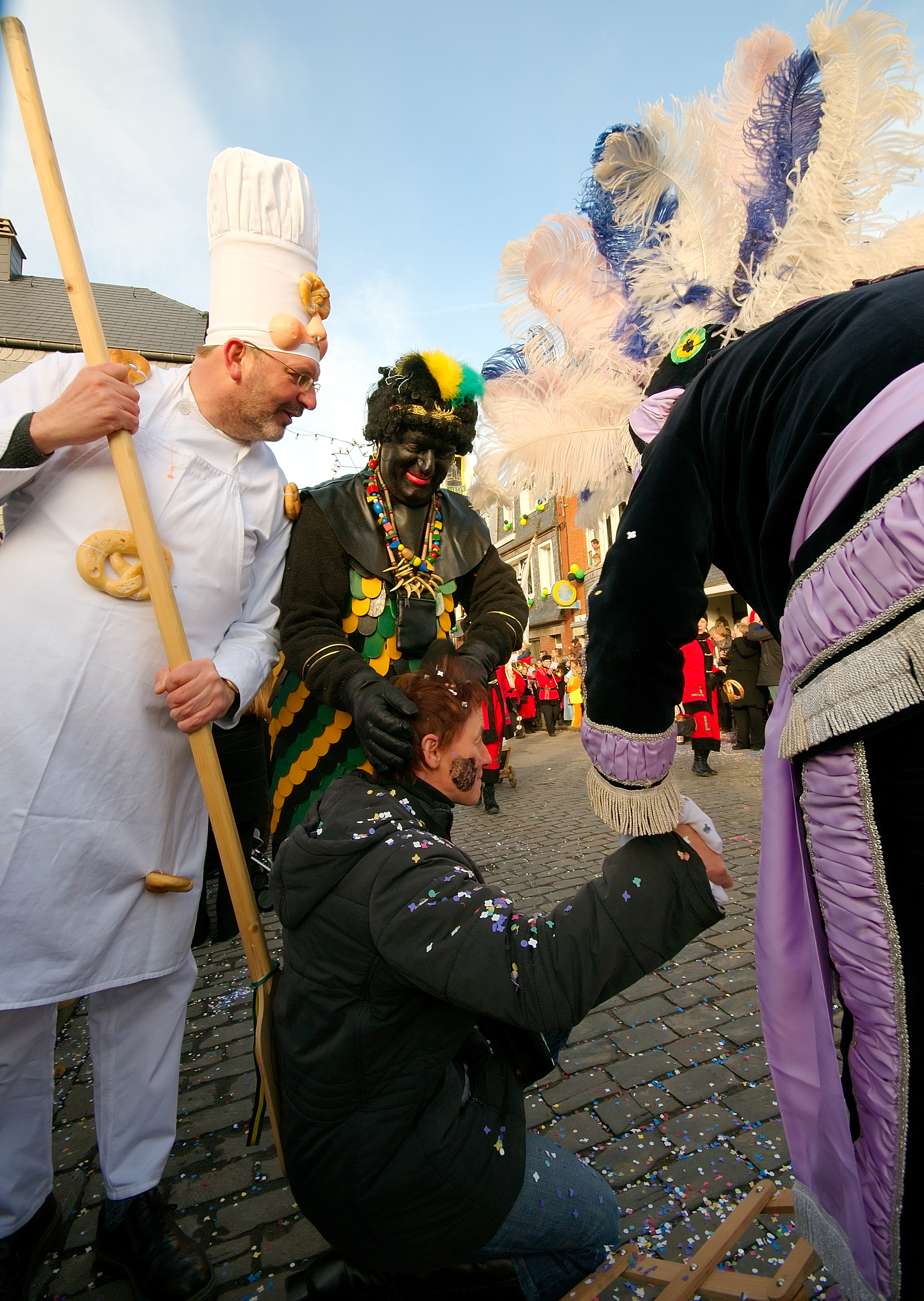
Cwarmê, Sunday. Haguète and others traditional costumes.

Inhabitants are proud of their Walloon language and their typical folklore. The people of Malmedy never miss the chance to celebrate a festival. The main celebrations in Malmedy are the "Cwarmê" (Carnival), the "Saint-Jean d’été" (Midsummer's Day), the "Saint-Pierre" (the annual funfair at Saint Peter's Day), the "Saint-Géréon" (in Walloon "Tribodlèdje") and the Saint Martin's day ("Evêuyes").

=== Cwarmê ===
The "Cwarmê", a Walloon word defining the Carnival of Malmedy, is the town's main festivity. Even though a part of the Malmedian culture is linked to the German culture, the "Cwarmê" of Malmedy is actually a Walloon and Latin carnival.

The celebration takes place from Shrove Friday to Shrove Tuesday, 40 days before Easter. The "Cwarmê" Sunday is the most important day. For the tourist, it's the opportunity to see the old traditional costumes in the streets (2,500 people in costume). The "Cwarmê" is depicted as a "street carnival" and is not only a parade: people who are disguised pass through the crowd and perform amongst them.

Some traditional costumes at the "Cwarmê" of Malmedy^{[52]}:

  - The "Haguète" is the most beautiful and most famous traditional costume of the "Cwarmê". She has a great hat with multi-coloured feathers and uses a form of long wooden tongs to catch the foot of a spectator.
  - The "Longuès-Brèsses" (Long-bras in French, Long-arms in English) is a type of clown with long arms. He uses his arms to catch a spectator's hat which he then puts on the head of another person.
  - The "Long-Né" consists of a group of eight people, each wearing a long-nose mask, a traditional blue smock and a long red & white cap. The group chooses a spectator in the crowd whom they follow and imitate until he offers them some beverages.

== Image gallery ==
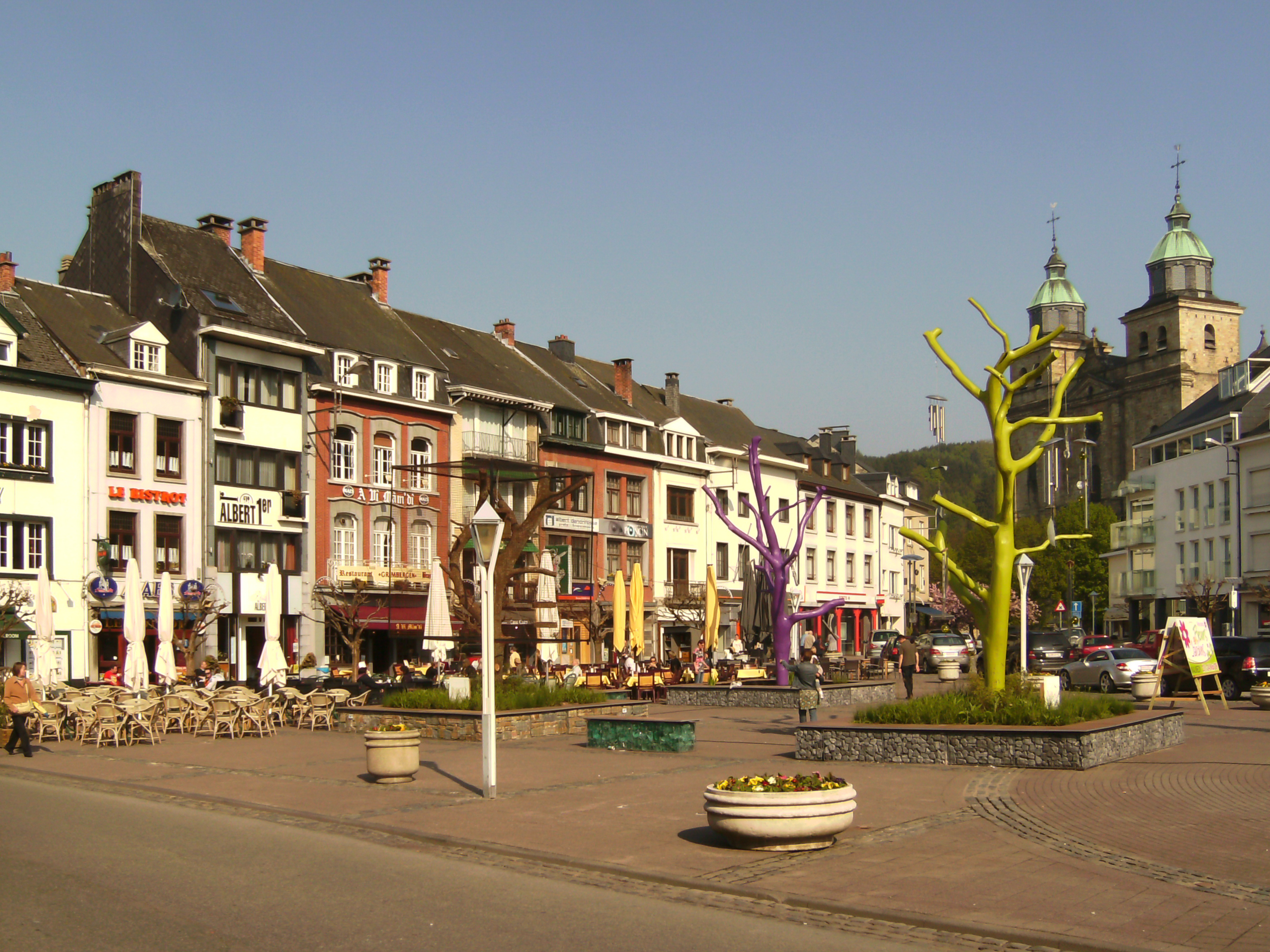
Malmedy, central square

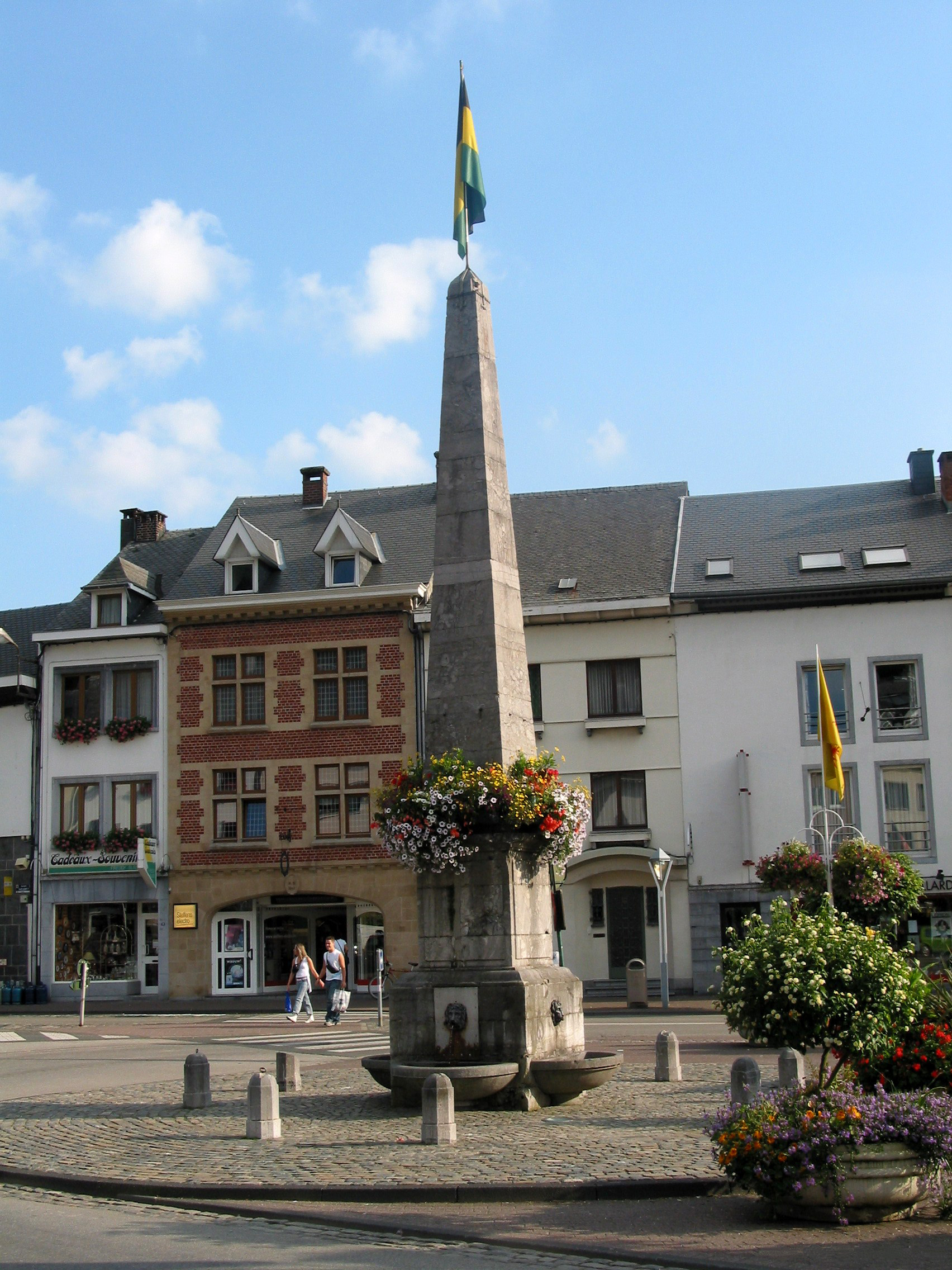
Obelisk in the centre of Malmedy

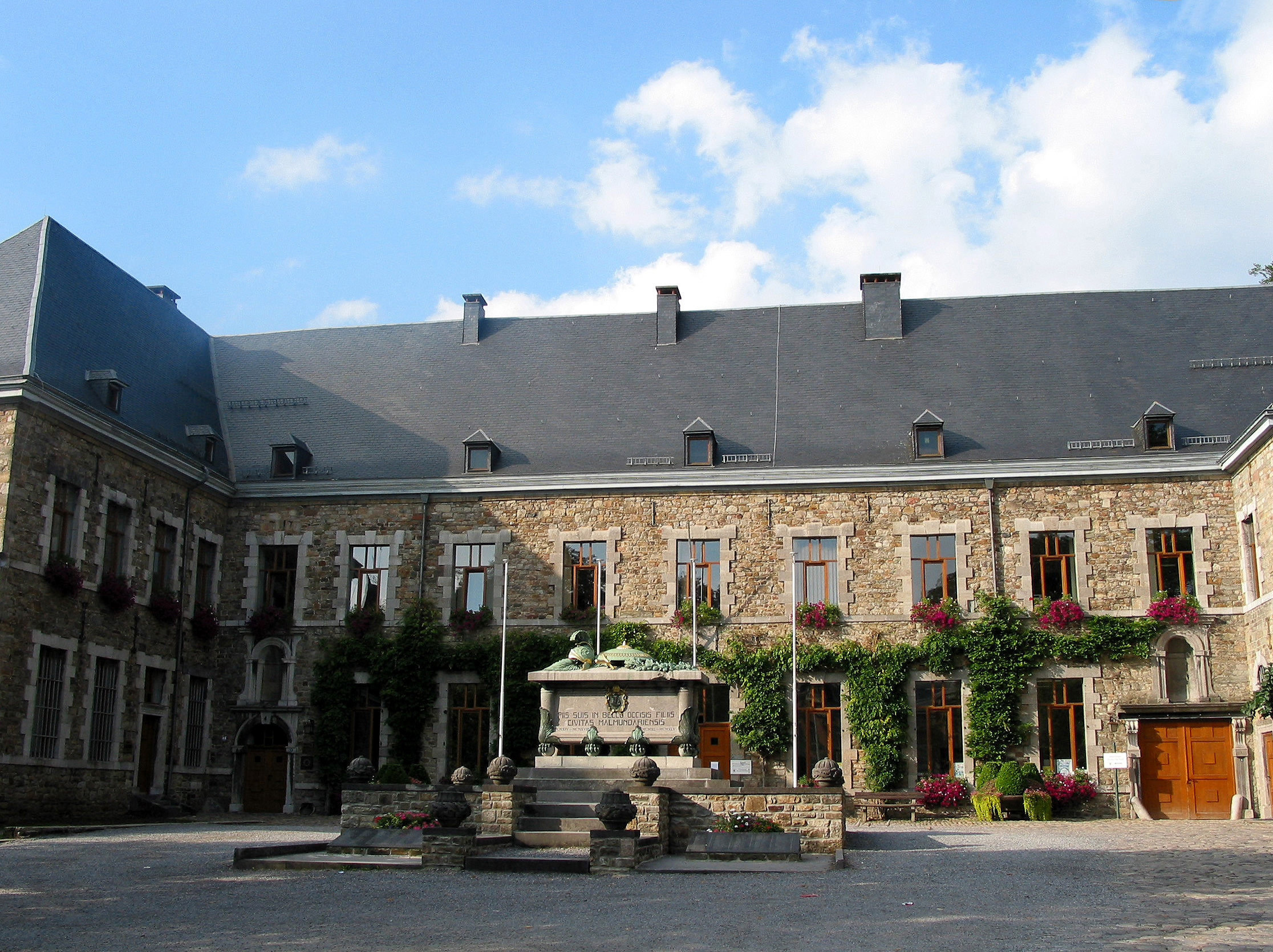
Malmedy Abbey, founded in 648, the sister of Stavelot Abbey

Plaque next to the shelter where civilians had been hiding during the bombings of 23–25 December 1944

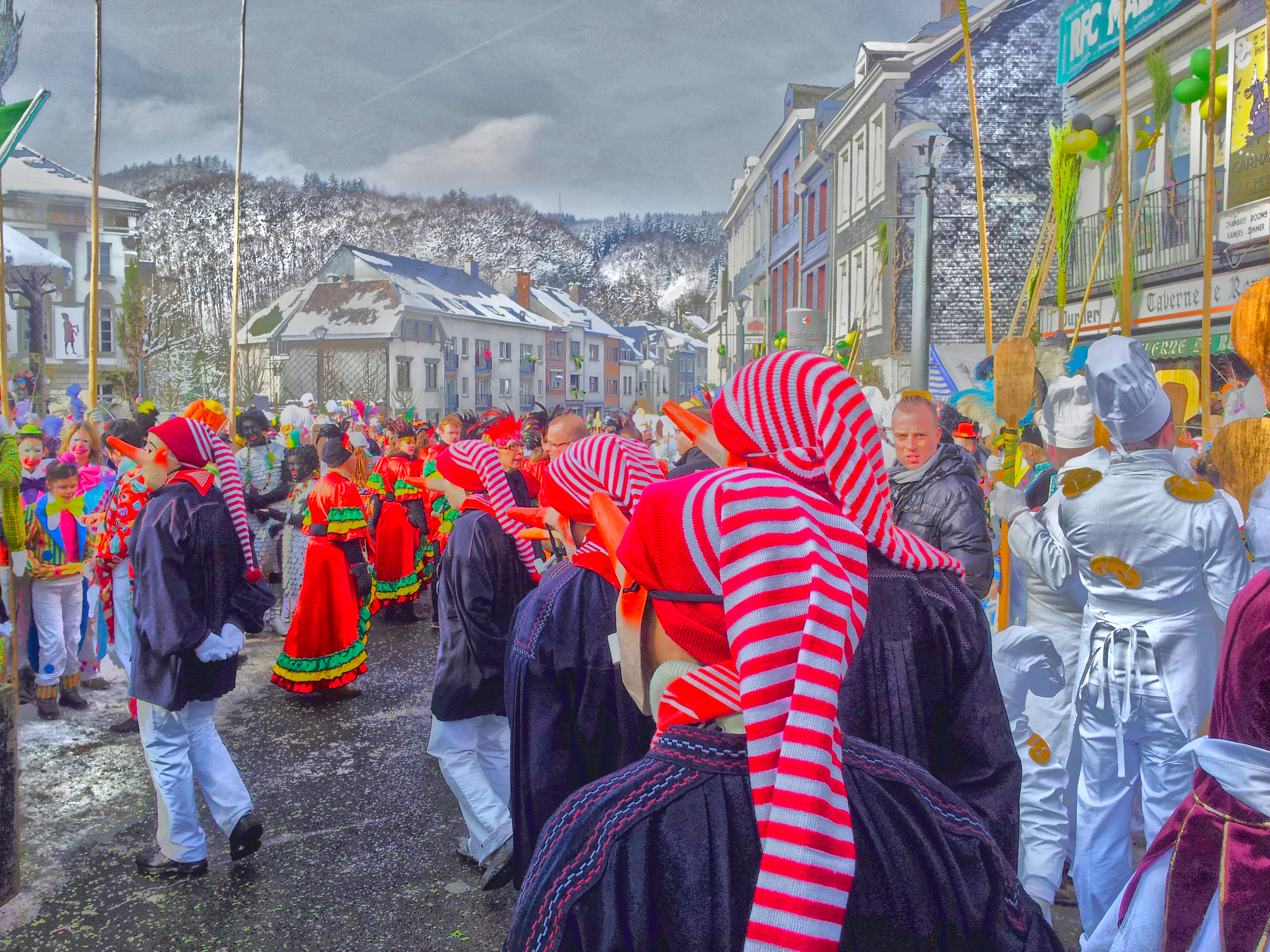
Cwarmê of Malmedy with Long-Nés and Longuès-Brèsses

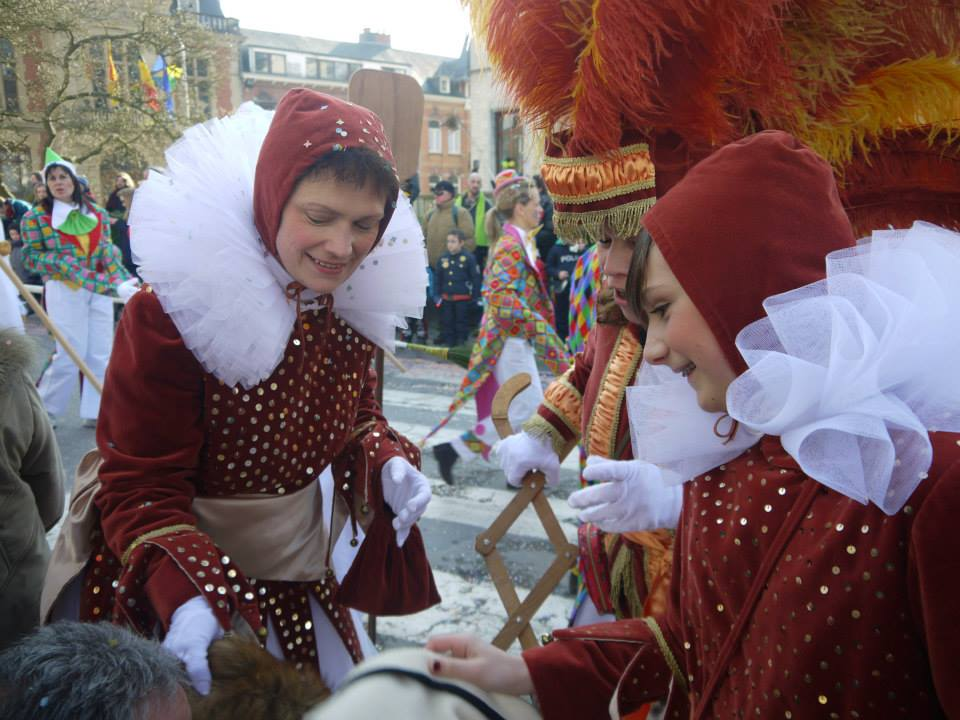
Cwarmê of Malmedy with Haguète and Arlequines

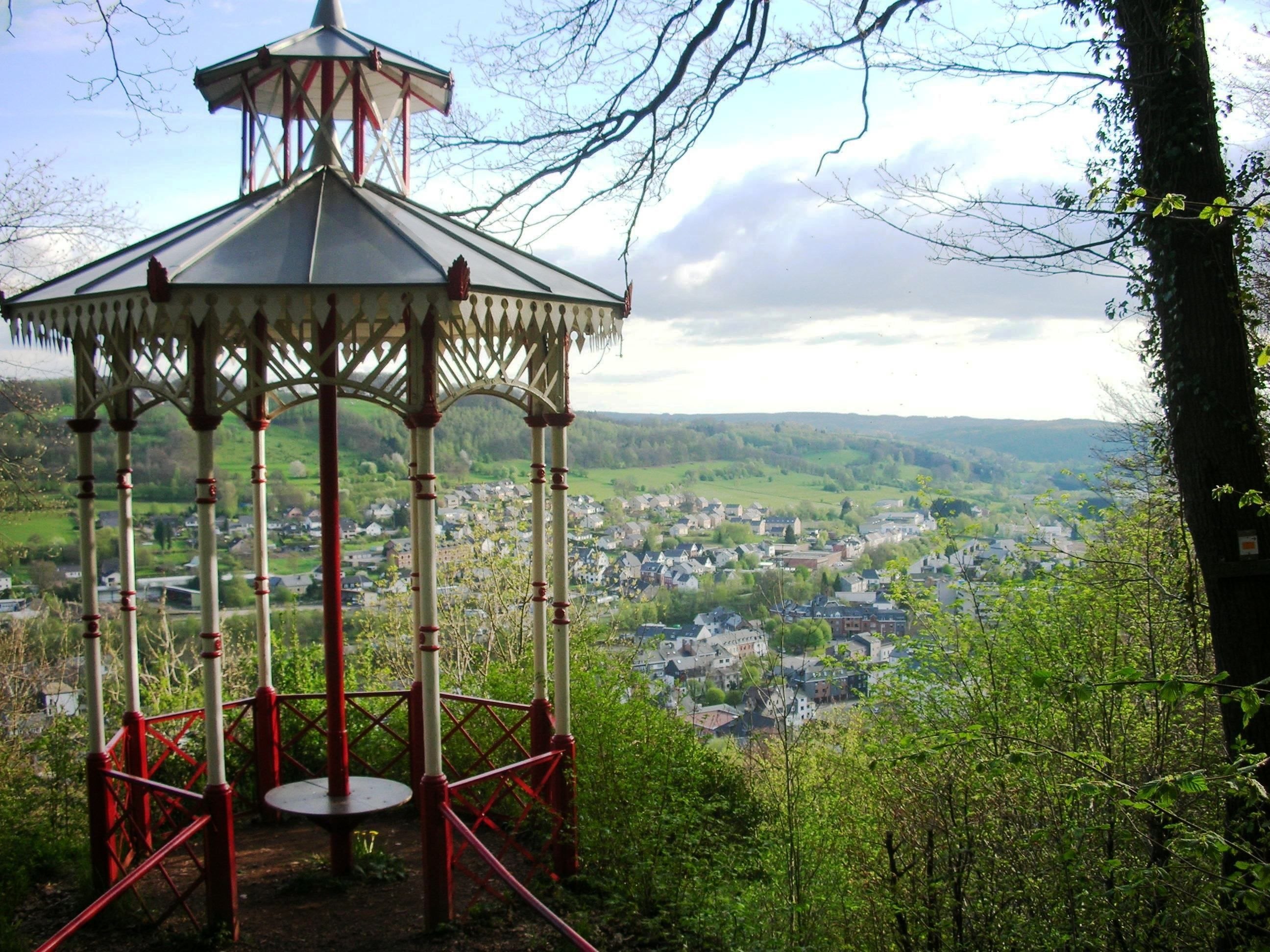

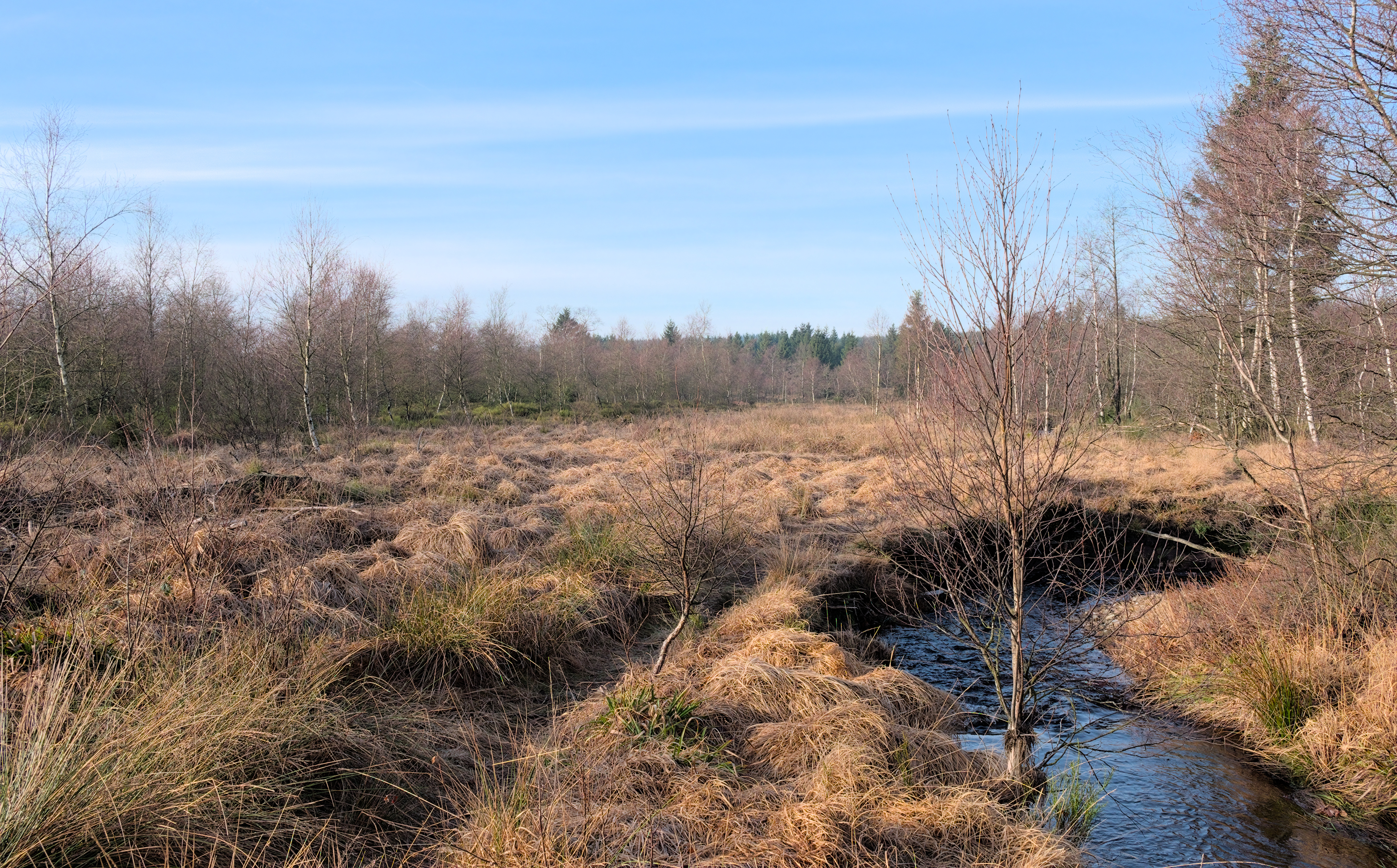
The North of Malmedy overlaps with High Fens – Eifel Nature Park

== Notable residents ==
- Christian Brüls (born 1988), footballer
- Joseph Doutrelepont (1834-1918), German surgeon and dermatologist
- Marie-Anne Libert (1782-1865), plant pathologist and mycologist
- Guido Maus (born 1964), painter and sculptor
- Henri Pousseur (1929-2009), composer
- Bernd Rauw (born 1980), footballer
- Olivier Werner (born 1985), footballer
- Raoul Ubac (1910-1985), painter, photographer and sculptor

== See also ==
- List of protected heritage sites in Malmedy
- Circuit de Spa-Francorchamps, with a corner named after Malmedy. Part of the track lies within the municipality.
