= Jünkerath =

- Municipality
- Coat of arms

- Location of Jünkerath within Vulkaneifel district
- Interactive map of Jünkerath
- Location within Germany Location within Rhineland-Palatinate
- Coordinates: 50°20′29″N 6°35′09″E
- Country: Germany
- State: Rhineland-Palatinate
- District: Vulkaneifel
- Municipal assoc.: Gerolstein

Government
  - Mayor (2019–24): Norbert Bischof

Area
  - Total: 10.1 km^{2} (3.9 sq mi)
- Elevation: 430 m (1,410 ft)

Population (2025-12-31)
  - Total: 1,772
  - Density: 175/km^{2} (454/sq mi)
- Time zone: UTC+01:00 (CET)
  - Summer (DST): UTC+02:00 (CEST)
- Postal codes: 54584
- Dialling codes: 06597
- Vehicle registration: DAU
- Website: www.juenkerath.de

Jünkerath (German pronunciation: [ˈjʏŋkəʁaːt]) is an Ortsgemeinde – a municipality belonging to a Verbandsgemeinde, a kind of collective municipality – in the Vulkaneifel district in Rhineland-Palatinate, Germany. It was th seat of the former Verbandsgemeinde of Obere Kyll.

== Geography ==
Jünkerath, along with its outlying centre (Ortsteil) of Glaadt, lies in the Kyll valley in the Eifel. Geologically, Jünkerath is part of the Kalkeifel (“Limestone Eifel”).

== History ==
Jünkerath is among the Eifel's oldest places. The name is derived from Icorigium, a station on the Trier-Cologne Roman road, which was marked as early as the 4th century on the Tabula Peutingeriana.

As a result of the Treaty of Lunéville, Jünkerath passed along with the rest of the lands on the Rhine’s left bank to France in 1801, and then in 1815 came the cession to Prussia. Count Sternberg-Manderscheid acquired in the 1803 Reichsdeputationshauptschluss as the landholder, among other things, the holdings formerly belonging to the monasteries at Weissenau and Schussenried in Upper Swabia to offset his loss of Blankenheim, Jünkerath, Gerolstein and Dollendorf.

=== Landgemeinde Jünkerath ===
The municipality of Jünkerath was newly formed by law on 27 February 1930. In the Gesetz betreffend die Bildung der Landgemeinde Jünkerath (Kreis Daun) (“Law Pertaining to the Formation of the Rural Municipality of Jünkerath [Daun District]”), the following was set forth:

“The rural municipality of Glaadt of the district of Daun is combined according to stipulation of boundary description appended to this law with parts of the rural municipalities of Feusdorf and Gönnersdorf of the district of Daun and with parts of the rural municipality of Schüller of the district of Prüm into a rural municipality of Jünkerath in the district of Daun.”

== Politics ==
=== Municipal council ===
The council is made up of 16 council members, who were elected by proportional representation at the municipal election held on 7 June 2009, and the honorary mayor as chairman.

The municipal election held on 7 June 2009 yielded the following results:

Year	SPD	CDU	Total
2009	6	10	16 seats
2004	5	11	16 seats

=== Mayor ===
Jünkerath's mayor is Norbert Bischof.

=== Coat of arms ===
The German blazon reads: Ein blauer Schild darin ein silberner Löwe mit goldener Krone, umgeben von 6 goldenen Lilien. Der Löwe trägt einen fünfzackigen roten Turnierkragen.

The municipality's arms might in English heraldic language be described thus: Azure semée of fleurs-de-lis Or a lion rampant argent armed and langued gules and crowned of the second surmounted at the shoulder by a label of five points of the fourth.

The German blazon does not match the coat of arms shown at the municipality's website. The blazon stipulates six lilies, but only five are shown, the lion's attitude, rampant, is not mentioned, nor does anything in the blazon deal with the tongue's or the claws’ tincture (“armed and langued gules”).

Jünkerath's arms go back to the old arms borne by the Lords of Jünkerath and to the time when Jünkerath belonged to the lordship at Schleiden.

The noblemen of Jünkerath possessed, like almost all Eifel noble families, their own coat of arms. The Jünkerath arms can also be found in the arms of the County of Blankenheim, which is quarterly. On 28 September 1934, the municipality appointed Schulze Grady to request of the Reich Minister of the Interior that Jünkerath be allowed to bear its own arms. Approval came early the next spring.

The arms have been borne since 28 March 1935.

== Culture and sightseeing ==
=== Museums ===
The Eisenmuseum (“Iron Museum”) in Jünkerath documents the Eifel iron industry's history since the 15th century. On display are, among other things, moulds, decorative ovens, cast iron plating and much more.

=== Buildings ===
==== Main centre ====
- Evangelical church, Kölner Straße 62, small quarrystone aisleless church from 1894 to 1895, rebuilt in 1950–1951, whole complex with churchyard and gravestones from the 18th to 20th centuries, fence from the time of building.
- Saint Anthony of Padua Catholic Parish Church (Pfarrkirche St. Antonius von Padua), Kölner Straße 71, Late Romanesque Revival quarrystone basilica from 1906 to 1907, whole complex with rectory (Kölner Straße 69).
- Am Glaadtbach 6 – estate along street, from 1858.

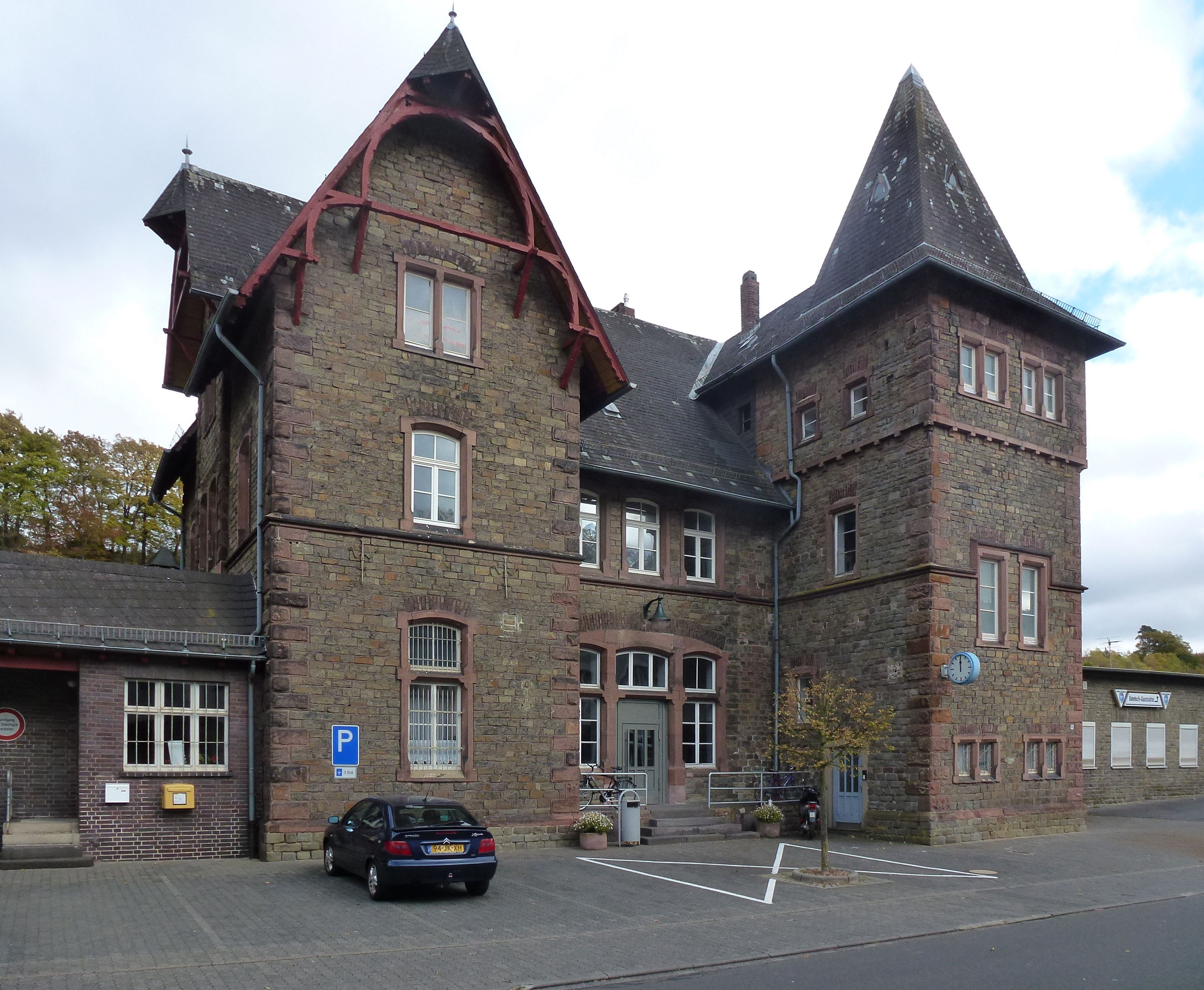
Railway station.

- Bahnhofstraße 9 – railway station on the Eifelbahn, big quarrystone reception building, separate side building, towards 1870.
- Burgstraße 17 – Schloss Jünkerath, a castle built by architect Philippart between 1726 and 1735, and destroyed in 1737, scant remains of wall.
- Gewerkschaftstraße 1 – Jünkerath labour union's former iron foundry, factory halls from the early 20th century.
- Gewerkschaftstraße 1 – former iron foundry's administration building, representative Baroque mansard roof building, apparently from 1770.
- Glaadter Straße 16 – Quereinhaus (a combination residential and commercial house divided for these two purposes down the middle, perpendicularly to the street), apparently from 1875.
- Glaadter Straße 23 – stately building with half-hipped gables
- Glaadter Straße 45 – Quereinhaus from 1860
- Glaadter Straße/corner of Am Sonnenberg – wayside cross, red sandstone pedestal cross, from 1758, possibly once a grave cross.
- Kölner Straße 69 – Catholic rectory.
- Schwarzer Pfad 1, 3 and 5 (monumental zone) – three houses (railway attendants’ houses or DEMAG works dwellings?), possibly late 19th century, two-storey buildings with small-block walls with knee walls and flat saddle roofs, with wings from the time of building and outbuildings in the back.

==== Glaadt ====
- Catholic Parish Church of the Finding of the True Cross (Pfarrkirche Hl. Kreuzauffindung), Auf den Eichen 3, new building, late 19th century.
- Burgbering 1-20, former railwaymen's settlement Neue Kolonie (monumental zone), from about 1920–1925, housing estate laid out in a ring shape in traditional local style with a gatehouse, six semidetached houses and a terrace of six bungalows, along with a central yard/garden enclosed by walls with gates or small outbuildings.
- Kölner Straße 27, 29 and 33 – three identically shaped semidetached houses (possibly railway attendants’ houses), two-storey buildings with unplastered small-block walls built in a similar shape to the railway station.

== Economy and infrastructure ==
Jünkerath station lies on the Eifelbahn (Cologne–Euskirchen–Gerolstein–Trier) and at peak times is served by the following trains:

- the Eifel-Mosel-Express (Cologne–Euskirchen–Gerolstein–Trier);
- the Eifel-Express (Cologne–Euskirchen–Gerolstein with connection to Trier);
- the Eifel-Bahn (Cologne–Euskirchen–Kall, and at peak times on to Gerolstein).

For all local public transport, three tariff systems apply: the Verkehrsverbund Region Trier (VRT), the Verkehrsverbund Rhein-Sieg, and for journeys crossing tariff zones, the NRW-Tarif.

Once, there was a junction in Jünkerath where the now abandoned and dismantled Vennquerbahn branched off the Eifelbahn, leading by way of Losheim at the Belgian border to Malmedy.
