= Ormont =

- Municipality
- Coat of arms

- Location of Ormont within Vulkaneifel district
- Interactive map of Ormont
- Location within Germany Location within Rhineland-Palatinate
- Coordinates: 50°19′39.20″N 6°26′33.79″E
- Country: Germany
- State: Rhineland-Palatinate
- District: Vulkaneifel
- Municipal assoc.: Gerolstein

Government
  - Mayor (2019–24): Andreas Maus

Area
  - Total: 12.44 km^{2} (4.80 sq mi)
- Elevation: 530 m (1,740 ft)

Population (2025-12-31)
  - Total: 345
  - Density: 27.7/km^{2} (71.8/sq mi)
- Time zone: UTC+01:00 (CET)
  - Summer (DST): UTC+02:00 (CEST)
- Postal codes: 54597
- Dialling codes: 06557
- Vehicle registration: DAU
- Website: www.ormont.de

Ormont is an Ortsgemeinde (a municipality belonging to a Verbandsgemeinde, a kind of collective municipality) situated in the Vulkaneifel district in Rhineland-Palatinate, Germany. It belongs to the Verbandsgemeinde of Gerolstein, whose seat is in the municipality of Gerolstein.

== Name ==
It is often supposed that Ormont's name is of French origin (or = “gold”; mont = “mountain”), but this is not so. In the Liber Aureus, the “Golden Book” of the town of Prüm, is a boundary description for the centres of Olzheim and Ormont. Here, the village is called Aurimuncio, in Mediaeval Latin. Nonetheless, this does have the same literal meaning as the supposed French derivation (aurum = “gold”; mons/montem = “mountain”). Either way, therefore, the municipality's name means “Gold Mountain”.

== Geography ==
=== Location ===
The municipality lies at the foot of the Schneifel in the Vulkaneifel, a part of the Eifel known for its volcanic history, geographical and geological features, and even ongoing activity today, including gases that sometimes well up from the earth.

=== Geology ===
Geologically interesting is the Goldberg, a local mountain whose name, like Ormont's own, means “Gold Mountain”, but in Modern High German. The former volcano is the Vulkaneifel's westernmost outlier. Its name comes from the many biotite crystals that glitter in the sun. In the local folkspeech, these have been given the name Katzengold (“cat gold”), although this is actually a name given several minerals in German, including fool's gold. Now and then, olivine nodules can also be found. Since the Second World War, the volcano's lava has been intensively quarried.

== History ==
In Roman times a road led from Losheim to Ormont, which to this day bears the name Walenstraße. The word Walen comes from the Old High German walahisc, which meant “Romance- (but originally Celtic-) speaking”. It is cognate with the English word “Welsh”.

In 893, Ormont had its first documentary mention when Prüm Abbey’s directory of holdings, the Prümer Urbar, said that all inhabitants of Oremunte were to make hay for Prüm Abbey.

The boundary description mentioned above (see Name), however, is believed to date from 801, but this cannot be definitively confirmed. What can be said, though, is that Ormont can look back on a history more than 1,200 years old.

In the directory of holdings from 1222, the reader learns that the Count of Vianden was enfeoffed by the Prüm Church with “the estate at Oremunte”. Almost a century later, in 1320, Friedrich II of Blankenheim was enfeoffed by King John of Bohemia, who was also Duke of Luxembourg, with the village of Oyrmunde. Friedrich's wife was “Else, Frau von Neuenstein” (see Neuenstein below).

In 1329, the brothers Arnold I and Gerhard V of Blankenheim bought the estate of Neuenstein (as discussed later, the castle had not yet been built). Ever since, Neuenstein's history has been bound with Ormont's. In the early 14th century, Ormont was therefore Luxembourgish domain and was held by the Lords of Blankenheim as a fief.

In 1361, Ormont and Neuenstein passed by way of exchange to Johann I of Schleiden and his brother Konrad of Schleiden, Provost at St. Gereon in Cologne. About 1365, Konrad built Castle Neuenstein.

In 1450, Ormont and Neuenstein changed lords once again, ending up under the Counts of Manderscheid-Schleiden. They were a mighty and influential dynasty with good relations with the Imperial court, and they significantly shaped the Eifel’s history in the Late Middle Ages.

After this comital line died out in 1593, Count Philipp von der Mark held Ormont and Neuenstein unrightfully for the next 20 years. From 1613 to 1719, the two centres were held by the House of Manderscheid-Gerolstein (Kronenburg). From 1719 on, they were then held by Manderscheid-Blankenheim-Gerolstein (Kronenburg).

The last regent was Augusta, Imperial Countess at Manderscheid. She fled in 1794 before French Revolutionary troops with her husband, Christian von Sternberg, to his holdings in Bohemia.

In the autumn of 1794, the French occupied Ormont and Neuenstein. Ormont was grouped into the Department of Ourthe in the Arrondissement of Malmedy and the Canton of Kronenburg. More locally, it was administered by the Mairie (“Mayoralty”) of Hallschlag.

After the Congress of Vienna in 1814 and 1815, the village passed to Prussia as part of the Rhine Province, becoming a self-administering municipality in the Amtsbezirk of Stadtkyll in the Prüm district.

Late in the Second World War, the village sustained heavy damage during the Battle of the Bulge. The local soldiers’ graveyard recalls this difficult time of war in early 1945.

In the course of administrative restructuring in Rhineland-Palatinate in 1970, Ormont passed to the Verbandsgemeinde of Obere Kyll, and ever since it has belonged to the Daun district, which has since been given the name Vulkaneifel.

=== Neuenstein ===
About 1300, an “Else, Frau von Neuenstein” crops up in the archives. If this Else was an hereditary daughter of a Lord of Neuenstein, then the House of Neuenstein would be traceable back to the 13th century. However, Else seems to have had no strong link to Neuenstein. When her husband, Friedrich II of Blankenheim, died, she sold the Neuenstein estate in 1329 to Arnold I and Gerhard V of Blankenheim. Arnold's grandson, Gerhard VI of Blankenheim exchanged Neuenstein and Ormont in 1361 for other landholdings.

The new owners were Johann I of Schleiden and his brother Konrad of Schleiden, Provost at St. Gereon in Cologne. On a conical hill, high above the river Prüm's left bank, about 1365, Konrad built Castle Neuenstein. Whatever his spiritual leanings were, Konrad was also a fervent warrior. The castle served him in defending his estate against his Blankenheim cousins, with whom he was at war. Surrounding the castle were broad moats, which were fed by the river Prüm. The castle could be entered behind a wall from the east. In 1370, Provost Konrad died, whereupon the new owner became Konrad V of Schleiden. He openly styled himself “Lord of Ormont and Neuenstein”.

In 1397, the Cologne Council sent a “Johann von Neuenstein” to the Imperial encampment at Frankfurt. In 1413, a “Dr. jur. Johann von Neuenstein” also crops up. Also witnessed in written records are Wolf Ludwig von Neuenstein, Hermann Dietrich von Neuenstein and Georg von Neuenstein.

In 1794, French Revolutionary troops burnt Castle Neuenstein down and sold it off as a quarry. Scant remnants of the foundations are all that can be found today.

== Politics ==
=== Municipal council ===
The council is made up of 8 council members, who were elected by majority vote at the municipal election held on 7 June 2009, and the honorary mayor as chairman.

=== Mayor ===
Ormont's mayor is Andreas Maus.

=== Coat of arms ===
The German blazon reads: Unter goldenem Zackenschildhaupt und über goldenem Bogenschildfuß (Berg), darin ein roter Drachenkopf, der mit einem roten Kreuzstab bedeckt ist, in Rot fünf (2:1:2) silberne Kugeln, begleitet rechts und links von je einer goldenen Gleve.

The municipality's arms might in English heraldic language be described thus: Gules five plates, two, one and two, between two glaives Or in fess, the whole between a chief indented and in base a mount of the second, the latter charged with a dragon's head erased surmounted by a Latin cross of the first.

Ormont and the outlying centre of Neuenstein belonged in feudal times to the County of Manderscheid. The “chief indented” – the stripe across the top of the escutcheon with the sawtooth lower edge – is a reference to the arms borne by those counts, whose arms were actually charged with a fess dancetty of four (see the article about the county to see the Manderscheid arms). Konrad of Schleiden, builder of Castle Neuenstein, bore arms charged with golden glaives (a mediaeval pole weapon). The five “plates” (silver roundels, or in this case balls or orbs, as the German blazon has it) are taken from a seal used by a Johann von Neuenstein. The golden mount symbolizes the Goldberg, a mountain in the municipality whose name has the same meaning as the municipality's Latin-derived name, and the charge is therefore also canting. The dragon's head and the Latin cross are Saint Margaret's attributes, thus representing the municipality's and the church's patron saint.

The proposal for and the design of the arms came from Herbert Blum. The arms have been borne since 1992.

== Culture and sightseeing ==
=== Buildings ===
- Saint Margaret's Catholic Parish Church (Pfarrkirche St. Margaretha), Kirchweg 1 – Gothic Revival aisleless church, 1850.
- At Schneifelstraße 12 – residential half of a Quereinhaus (a combination residential and commercial house divided for these two purposes down the middle, perpendicularly to the street) (?) from 1791.
- Near Weinstraße 12 – wayside cross, cast-iron crucifix of unknown date.
- Wayside crosses, southwest of the village at a fork in the road – cast-iron crucifix of unknown date.
