= List of castles in Rhineland-Palatinate =

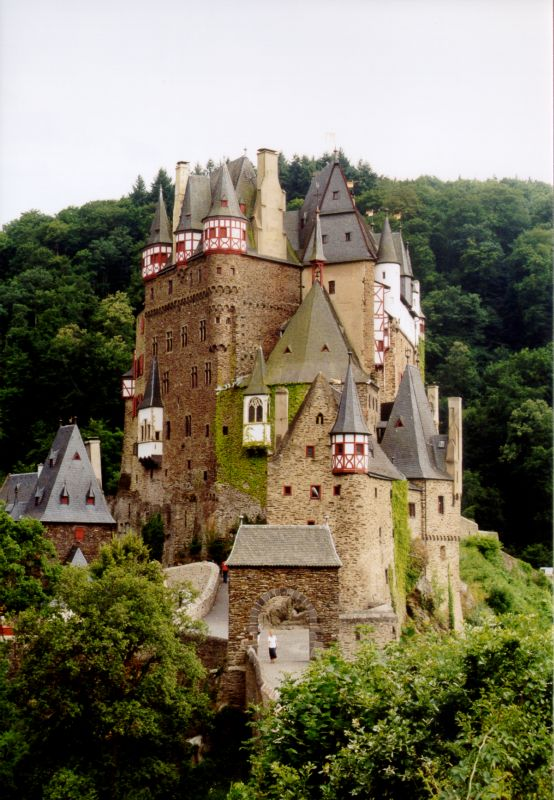
Eltz Castle

Numerous castles are found in the German state of Rhineland-Palatinate. These buildings, some of which have a history of over 1000 years, were the setting of historical events and the domains of famous personalities; and many still are imposing edifices to this day.

This list encompasses buildings variously described in German as Burg (castle), Festung (fort/fortress), Schloss (manor house, palace or hunting lodge) and Palais/Palast (palace). Many German castles after the Middle Ages were built as, or converted to, royal or ducal palaces rather than fortified buildings.

== Landkreis Ahrweiler ==
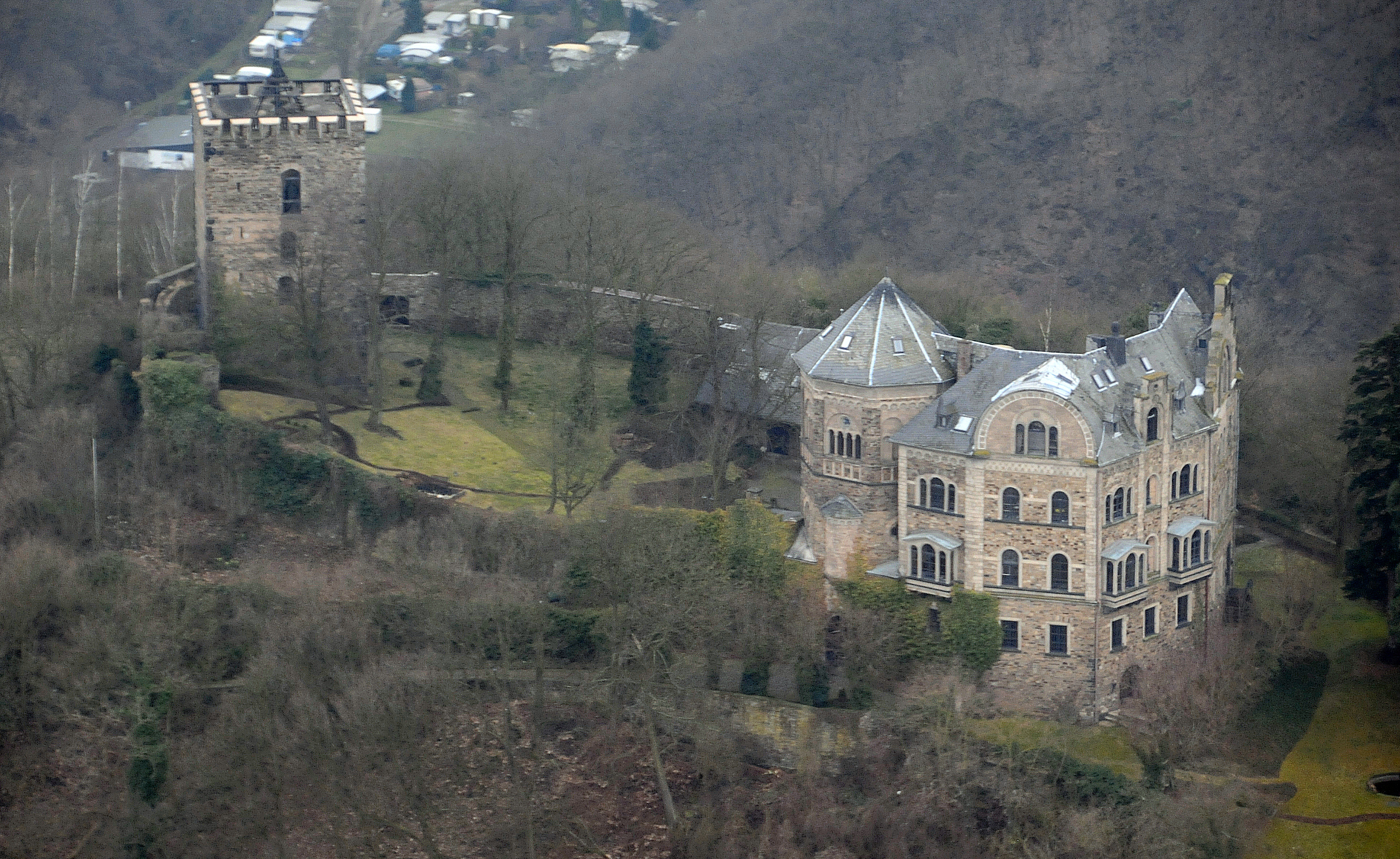
Rheineck Castle

1. Are Castle, Altenahr
2. Ahrenthal Palace, Sinzig
3. Alkburg, Brohl-Lützing
4. Brohleck Manor, Brohl-Lützing
5. Burgbrohl Manor, Burgbrohl
6. Landskron Castle, Bad Neuenahr
7. Marienfels Castle, Remagen
8. Neuenahr Castle, Bad Neuenahr
9. Nürburg Castle, Nürburg
10. Olbrück Castle, Niederzissen
11. Rheineck Castle, Bad Breisig
12. Saffenburg, Mayschoss
13. Schweppenburg, Brohl-Lützing

== Landkreis Altenkirchen (Westerwald) ==
1. Freusburg, Kirchen (Sieg)
2. Schloss Friedewald, Friedewald (Westerwald)

== Landkreis Alzey-Worms ==
1. Alzeyer Schloss, Alzey
2. Abenheim Castle, Abenheim

== Landkreis Bad Dürkheim ==
1. Battenberg Castle, Battenberg (Palatinate)
2. Elmstein Castle, Elmstein
3. Neuleiningen Castle, Neuleiningen
4. Altleiningen Castle, Altleiningen
5. Bischöfliches Schloss, Dirmstein
6. Breitenstein Castle, Esthal
7. Deidesheim Castle, Deidesheim
8. Emichsburg, Bockenheim an der Weinstraße
9. Erfenstein Castle, Esthal
10. Hambach Castle, Neustadt an der Weinstraße
11. Hardenburg, Bad Dürkheim
12. Heidenlöcher (Fliehburg), Deidesheim
13. Heidenmauer, Bad Dürkheim
14. Kehrdichannichts hunting lodge, Bad Dürkheim
15. Koeth-Wanscheidsches Schloss, Dirmstein
16. Lichtenstein Castle, Neidenfels
17. Murrmirnichtviel hunting lodge, Bad Dürkheim
18. Neidenfels Castle, Neidenfels
19. Schloss Neuburg, Obrigheim (Palatinate)
20. Nonnenfels, Isenachtal
21. Quadtsches Schloss, Dirmstein
22. Schaudichnichtum hunting lodge, Bad Dürkheim
23. Sturmfedersches Schloss, Dirmstein
24. Wachtenburg, Wachenheim an der Weinstraße
25. Weilach House, Bad Dürkheim

== Landkreis Bad Kreuznach ==
1. Altenbaumburg, Altenbamberg
2. Argenschwang Castle, Argenschwang
3. Dalberg Castle, Dalberg
4. Schloss Dhaun, Hochstetten-Dhaun
5. Ebernburg, Bad Münster am Stein-Ebernburg
6. Gollenfels Castle, Stromberg
7. Gutenburg, Gutenberg
8. Kauzenburg, Bad Kreuznach
9. Kyrburg, Kirn
10. Montfort Castle, Duchroth
11. Naumburg Castle, Bärenbach
12. Neu-Baumburg, Neu-Bamberg
13. Pfarrköpfchen Castle, Stromberg
14. Rheingrafenstein Castle, Bad Münster am Stein-Ebernburg
15. Schloss Rheingrafenstein, Bad Kreuznach
16. Schloßböckelheim Castle, Schloßböckelheim
17. Schmidtburg, Schneppenbach
18. Sponheim Castle, Burgsponheim
19. Stromburg, Stromberg
20. Treuenfels, Altenbamberg

== Landkreis Bernkastel-Wittlich ==
1. Baldenau Castle, Morbach
2. Schloss Bergfeld, Eisenschmitt
3. Landshut Castle, Bernkastel-Kues
4. Grevenburg, Traben-Trarbach
5. Castles of Manderscheid (Oberburg and Niederburg), Manderscheid
6. Mont Royal Fortress, Traben-Trarbach
7. Schloss Veldenz, Veldenz
8. Schloss Lieser, Lieser
9. Hunolstein Castle, Morbach
10. Starkenburg, Starkenburg (Mosel)
11. Schloss Philippsfreude, Wittlich

== Landkreis Birkenfeld ==
1. Bosselstein Castle, Idar-Oberstein
2. Schloss Oberstein, Idar-Oberstein
3. Schloss Birkenfeld, Birkenfeld
4. Frauenburg Castle, Frauenberg

== Eifelkreis Bitburg-Prüm ==
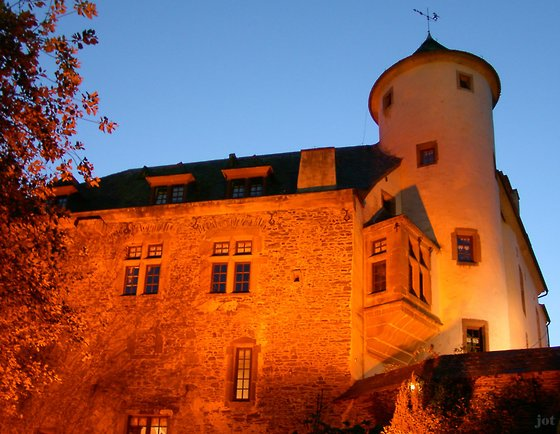
Neuerburg

1. Bollendorf Castle, Bollendorf
2. Dasburg, Dasburg
3. Dudeldorf Castle, Dudeldorf
4. Burg Falkenstein, Waldhof-Falkenstein
5. Schloss Holsthum, Holsthum
6. Kyllburg, Kyllburg
7. Schloss Malberg, Malberg
8. Neuerburg, Neuerburg
9. Prümerburg, Prümzurlay
10. Rittersdorf Castle, Rittersdorf
11. Schönecken Castle, Schönecken
12. Seinsfeld Castle, Seinsfeld
13. Schloss Weilerbach, Bollendorf

== Landkreis Cochem-Zell ==
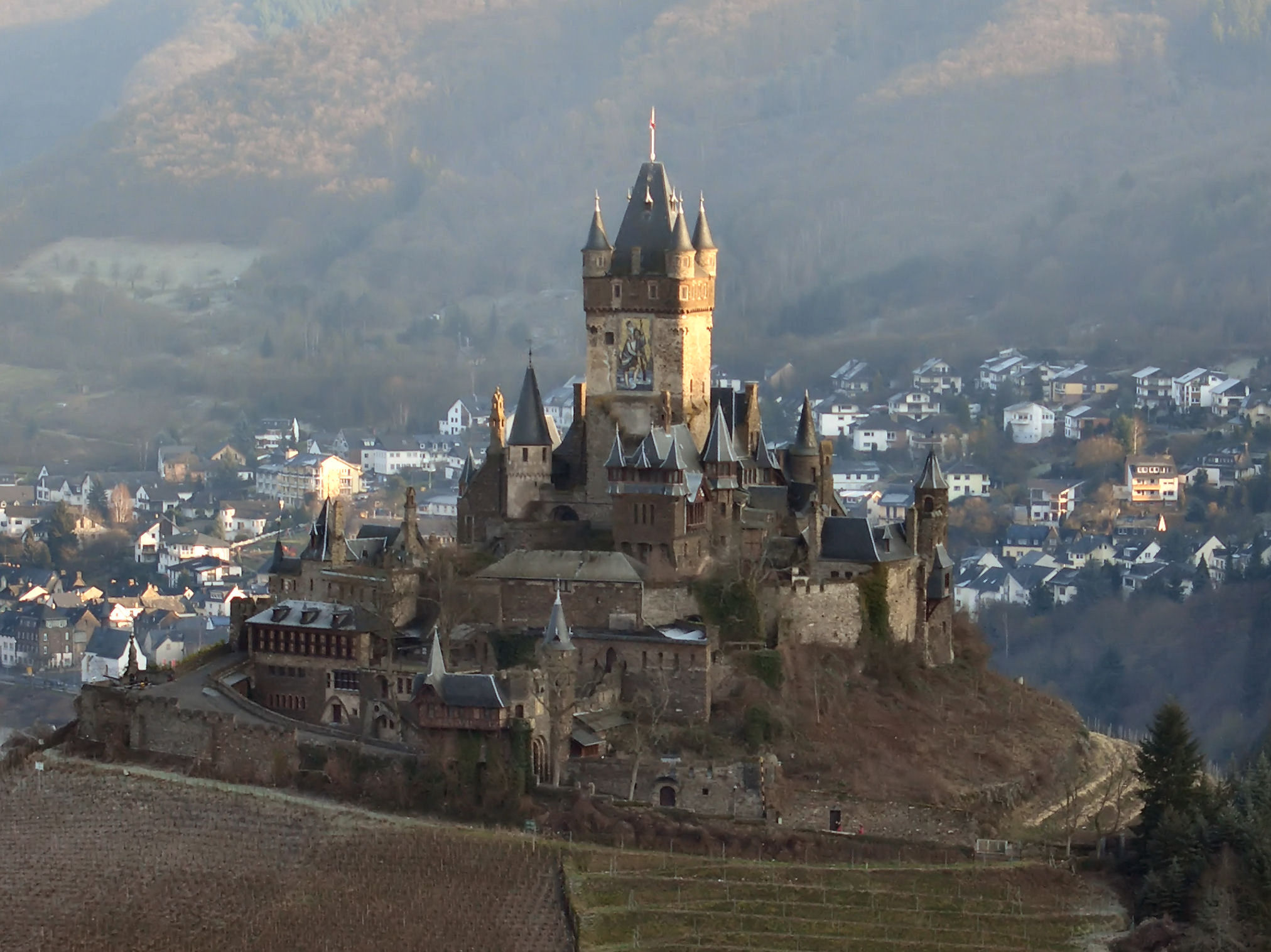
Reichsburg Cochem

1. Arras Castle, Alf
2. Cochem Castle, Cochem
3. Coraidelstein Castle, Klotten
4. Metternich Castle, Beilstein
5. Pyrmont Castle, Roes
6. Treis Castle, Treis-Karden
7. Ulmener Burgen, Ulmen
8. Wildburg, Treis-Karden
9. Winneburg, Cochem

== Donnersbergkreis ==
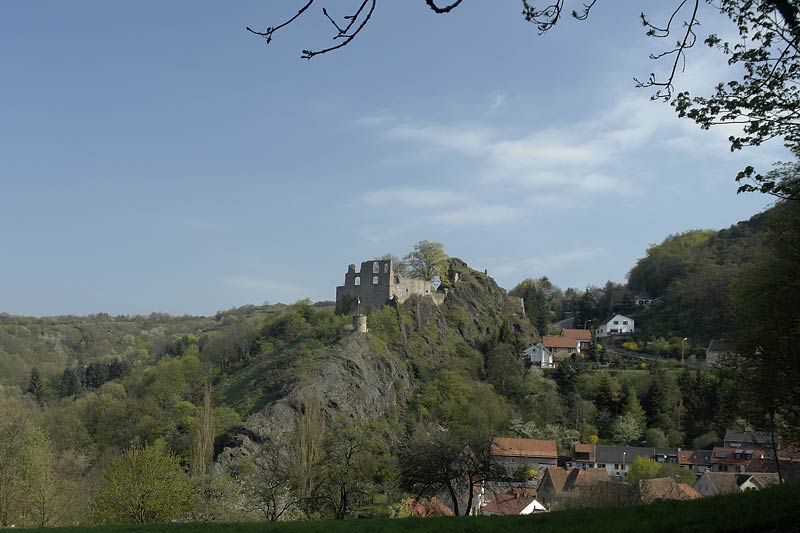
Burg Falkenstein

1. Altenbolanden Castle, Bolanden
2. Burg Falkenstein, Falkenstein
3. Burg Frauenstein, Ruppertsecken
4. Burg Hohenfels, Imsbach
5. Celtic rampart on the Donnersberg, Dannenfels
6. Kesselburg, Jakobsweiler
7. Schloss Kirchheimbolanden, Kirchheimbolanden
8. Landsberg Castle, Obermoschel
9. Burg Löwenstein, Niedermoschel
10. Neu-Bolanden Castle, Bolanden
11. Randeck Castle, Mannweiler-Cölln
12. Ruppertsecken Castle, Ruppertsecken
13. Stauf Castle, Eisenberg (Palatinate)
14. Tannenfels Castle, Dannenfels
15. Wildenstein Castle, Dannenfels
16. Biedesheim Castle, Biedesheim
17. Eisenberg Castle, Eisenberg, Rhineland-Palatinate
18. Gaugrehweiler Castle, Gaugrehweiler
19. Gehrweiler Castle, Burg Gehrweiler
20. Ilbesheim Castle, Ilbesheim
21. Schloss Imsweiler (Flörsheimer Schloss), Imsweiler
22. Ruhenburg, Rockenhausen
23. Stolzenburg, Bayerfeld-Steckweiler
24. Wartenberg Castle, Wartenberg-Rohrbach

== Landkreis Germersheim ==
1. Jagdschloss Friedrichsbühl, Bellheim
2. Germersheim Fortress, Germersheim
3. Schloss Germersheim, Germersheim
4. Schloss Jockgrim, Jockgrim
5. Schloss Weingarten, Weingarten (Palatinate)

== Landkreis Kaiserslautern ==
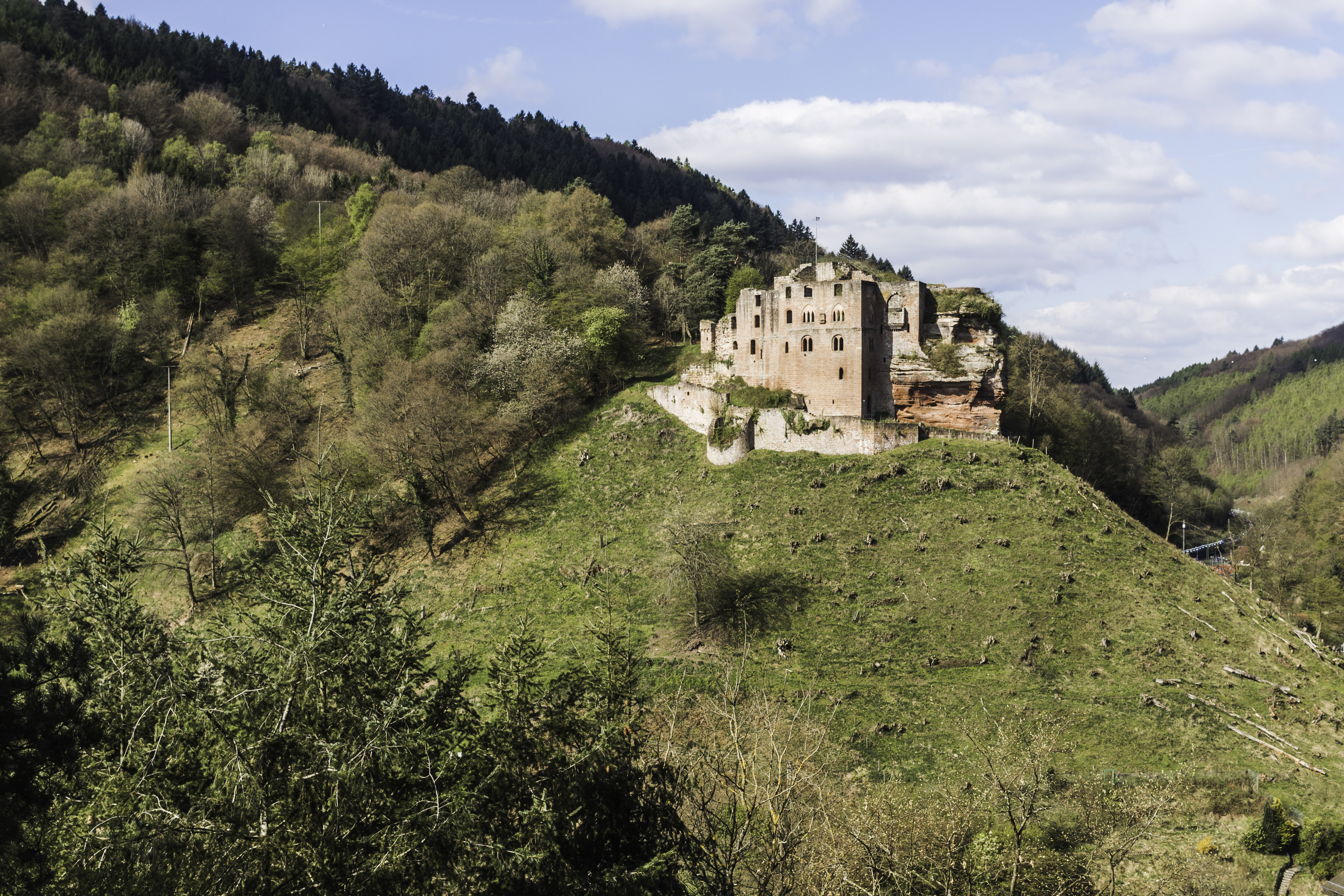
Frankenstein Castle, Palatinate

1. Alsenborn Castle, Enkenbach-Alsenborn
2. Diemerstein Castle, Frankenstein
3. Frankenstein Castle, Frankenstein
4. Nanstein Castle, Landstuhl
5. Perlenberg Castle, Bann
6. Schloss Hemsbach, Neuhemsbach
7. Trippstadt House, Trippstadt
8. Wilenstein Castle, Trippstadt
9. Dieboldsburg, Otterbach
10. Schloss Fischbach, Fischbach (bei Kaiserslautern)
11. Flörsheim Castle, Trippstadt
12. Glasburg, Fischbach (bei Kaiserslautern)
13. Schloss Neuhemsbach, Neuhemsbach
14. Otterbach Castle, Otterbach
15. Otterburg, Otterberg
16. Schallodenbach Castle, Schallodenbach
17. Schloss Schernau, Landstuhl
18. Sterrenberg Castle, Otterbach
19. Stolzenburg, Stelzenberg
20. Schloss Weilerbach, Weilerbach

== Kaiserslautern ==
1. Beilstein Castle
2. Hohenecken Castle
3. Kaiserpfalz (featured in "Legend of the Pike in the Imperial Fishpond")

== Koblenz ==
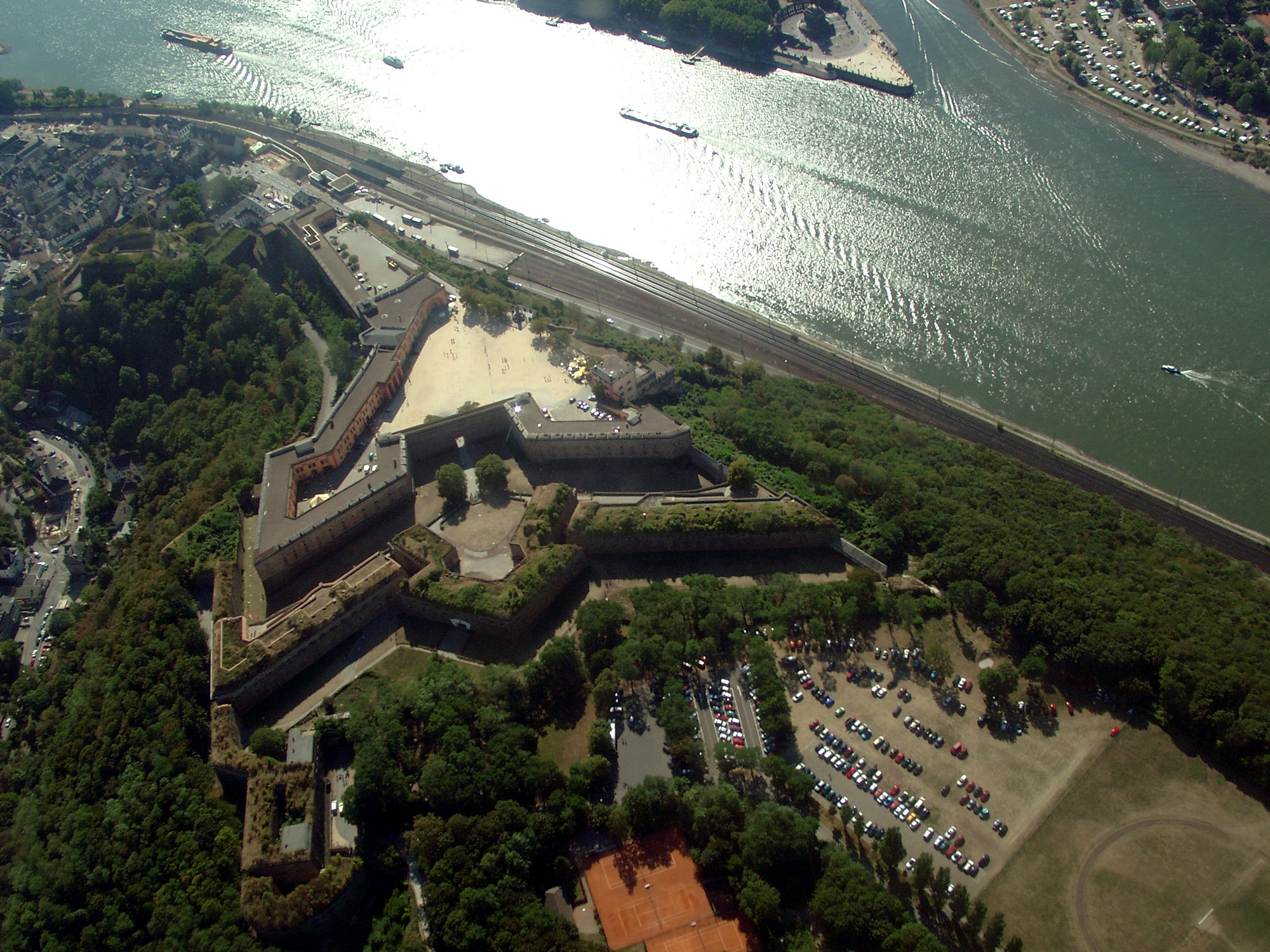
Aerial view of Festung Ehrenbreitstein

1. Old Castle
2. Feste Kaiser Alexander
3. Feste Kaiser Franz
4. Festung Ehrenbreitstein
5. Koblenz Fortress
6. Fort Asterstein
7. Fort Großfürst Konstantin
8. Electoral Palace
9. Neuendorfer Flesche
10. Schloss Philippsburg
11. Schloss Stolzenfels, Koblenz
12. Schloss Schönbornslust

== Landkreis Kusel ==
1. Altenburg, Wolfstein
2. Schloss Aschbacherhof, Aschbach
3. Deinsberg Castle, Theisbergstegen
4. Grumbach Castle, Grumbach
5. Heidenburg, Oberstaufenbach
6. Heidenburg, Kreimbach-Kaulbach
7. Schloss Herschweiler-Pettersheim, Herschweiler-Pettersheim
8. Ingweiler Castle, Reipoltskirchen
9. Kübelberg Castle, Schönenberg-Kübelberg
10. Schloss Lauterecken, Lauterecken
11. Lichtenberg Castle, Thallichtenberg
12. Liebsthal Castle, Quirnbach/Pfalz
13. Medard Castle, Medard
14. Michelsburg, Haschbach am Remigiusberg
15. Münchweiler Castle, Glan-Münchweiler
16. Naumburg, Ginsweiler
17. New Wolfstein Castle, Wolfstein
18. Odenbach Castle, Odenbach
19. Old Wolfstein Castle, Wolfstein
20. Schloss Pettersheim, Herschweiler-Pettersheim
21. Schloss Quirnbach, Quirnbach/Pfalz
22. Reipoltskirchen Castle, Reipoltskirchen
23. Schloss Schönbornerhof, Homberg
24. Sprengelburg, Eßweiler / Oberweiler im Tal
25. Wadenau Castle, Thallichtenberg

== Landau in der Pfalz ==
1. Fortanlagen
2. Schloss Landau
3. Schloss Arzheim
4. Godramstein Castle
5. Bundesfestung Landau
6. Queichheim Castle

== Ludwigshafen am Rhein ==
1. Mannheimer Rheinschanze

== Mainz ==
1. Mainz Fortress
2. Kurfürstliches Schloss Mainz
3. Martinsburg
4. Mainz Citadel
5. Lustschloss Favorite

== Landkreis Mainz-Bingen ==
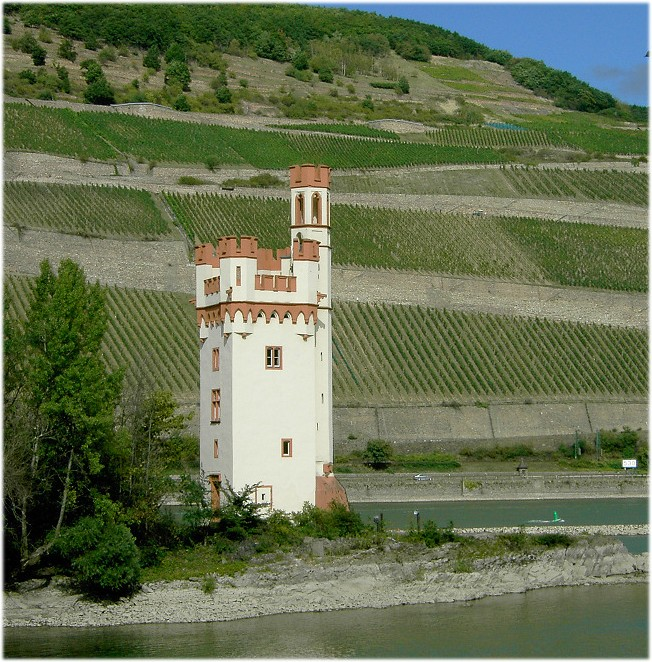
Mouse Tower

1. Fürstenberg Castle, Oberdiebach
2. Heimburg, Niederheimbach
3. Kaiserpfalz, Ingelheim
4. Klopp Castle, Bingen
5. Landskron Castle, Oppenheim
6. Mouse Tower, Bingen
7. Reichenstein Castle, Trechtingshausen
8. Rheinstein Castle (formerly also known as Vaitzburg or Voitsberg), Trechtingshausen
9. Schwabsburg Castle, Nierstein
10. Sooneck Castle, Niederheimbach
11. Stadeck Castle, Stadecken-Elsheim
12. Stahlberg Castle, Bacharach
13. Stahleck Castle, Bacharach
14. Windeck Castle, Heidesheim
15. Schloss Waldthausen, Budenheim
16. Trutzbingen, Münster-Sarmsheim

== Landkreis Mayen-Koblenz ==
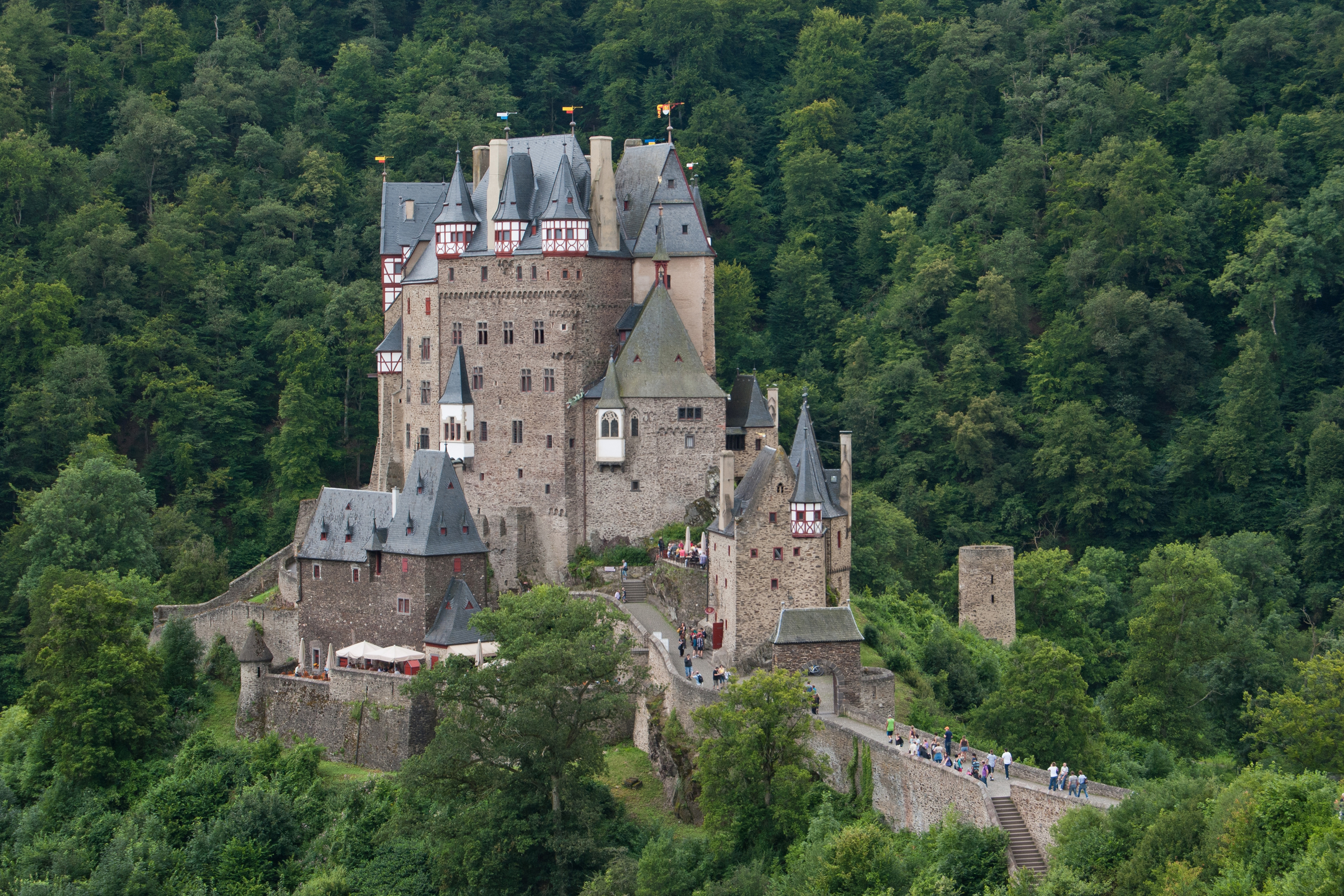
Eltz Castle

1. Schloss Bassenheim, Bassenheim
2. Bischofstein Castle, Münstermaifeld
3. Schloss Bürresheim, St. Johann
4. Ehrenburg, Brodenbach
5. Eltz Castle, Wierschem
6. Genovevaburg, Mayen
7. Goloring, Kobern-Gondorf
8. Schloss Gondorf, Kobern-Gondorf
9. Krayer Hof, Andernach
10. Stadtburg Andernach, Andernach
11. Laach Castle, Kruft
12. Schloss Liebig, Kobern-Gondorf
13. Löwenburg, Monreal
14. Namedy Castle, Andernach
15. Niederburg, Kobern-Gondorf
16. Oberburg, Kobern-Gondorf
17. Philippsburg, Monreal
18. Sayn Castle, Bendorf
19. Schloss Sayn, Bendorf
20. Thurant Castle, Alken
21. Trutzeltz Castle, Wierschem
22. Virneburg, Virneburg
23. Wernerseck Castle, Ochtendung

== Neustadt an der Weinstraße ==
1. Hambach Castle
2. Wolfsburg Castle

== Landkreis Neuwied ==
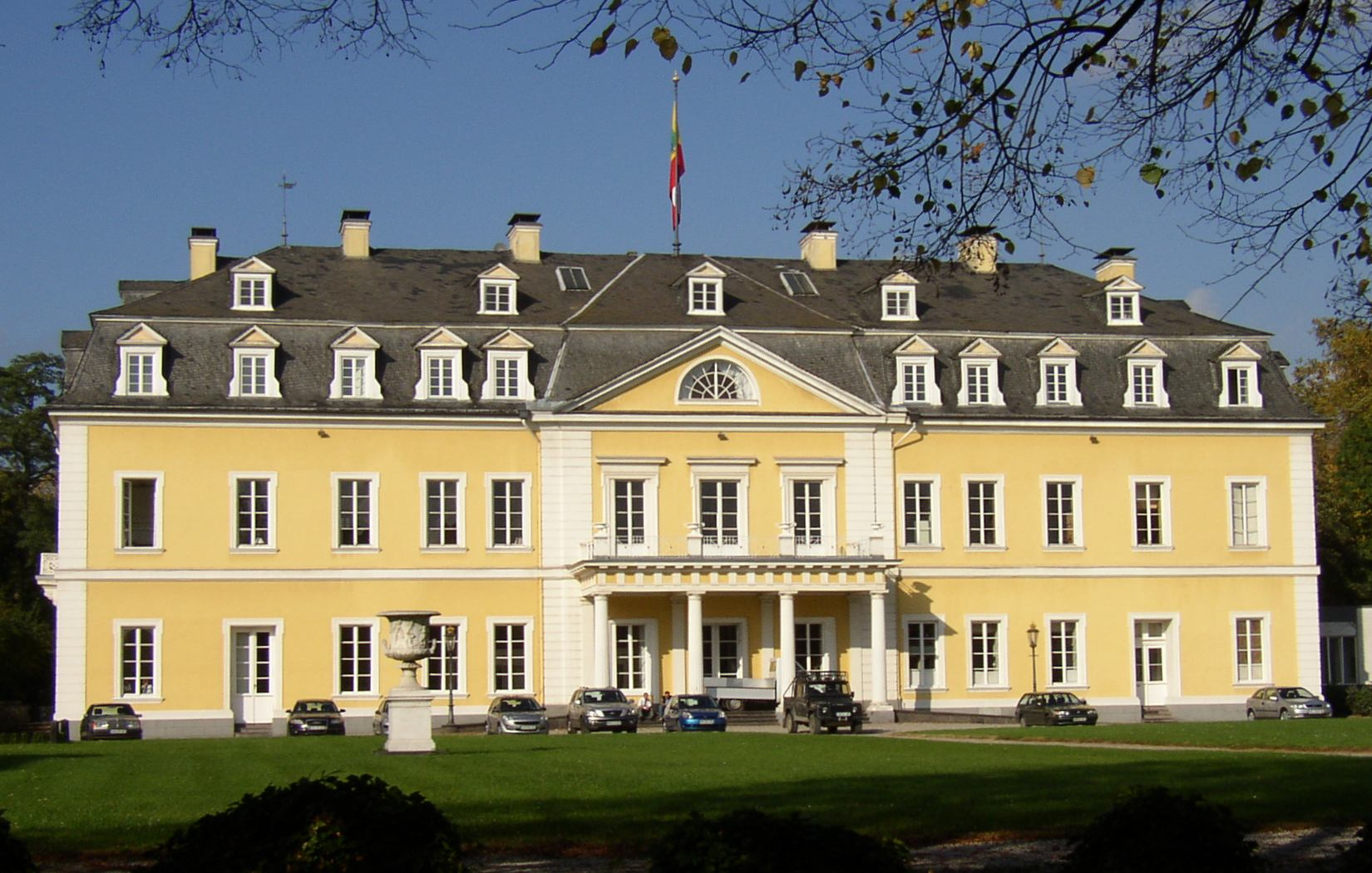
Schloss Neuwied

1. Altenwied Castle, Neustadt (Wied)
2. Altwied Castle, Neuwied
3. Schloss Arenfels, Bad Hönningen
4. Braunsberg Castle, Neuwied
5. Ehrenstein Castle, Neustadt (Wied)
6. Schloss Engers, Neuwied
7. Hammerstein Castle, Hammerstein
8. Isenburg, Isenburg
9. Linz Castle, Linz (Rhein)
10. Schloss Monrepos, Neuwied
11. Schloss Neuwied, Neuwied
12. Neuerburg, Niederbreitbach
13. Reichenstein Castle, Puderbach

== Pirmasens ==
1. Pirmasenser Schloss

== Rhein-Hunsrück-Kreis ==
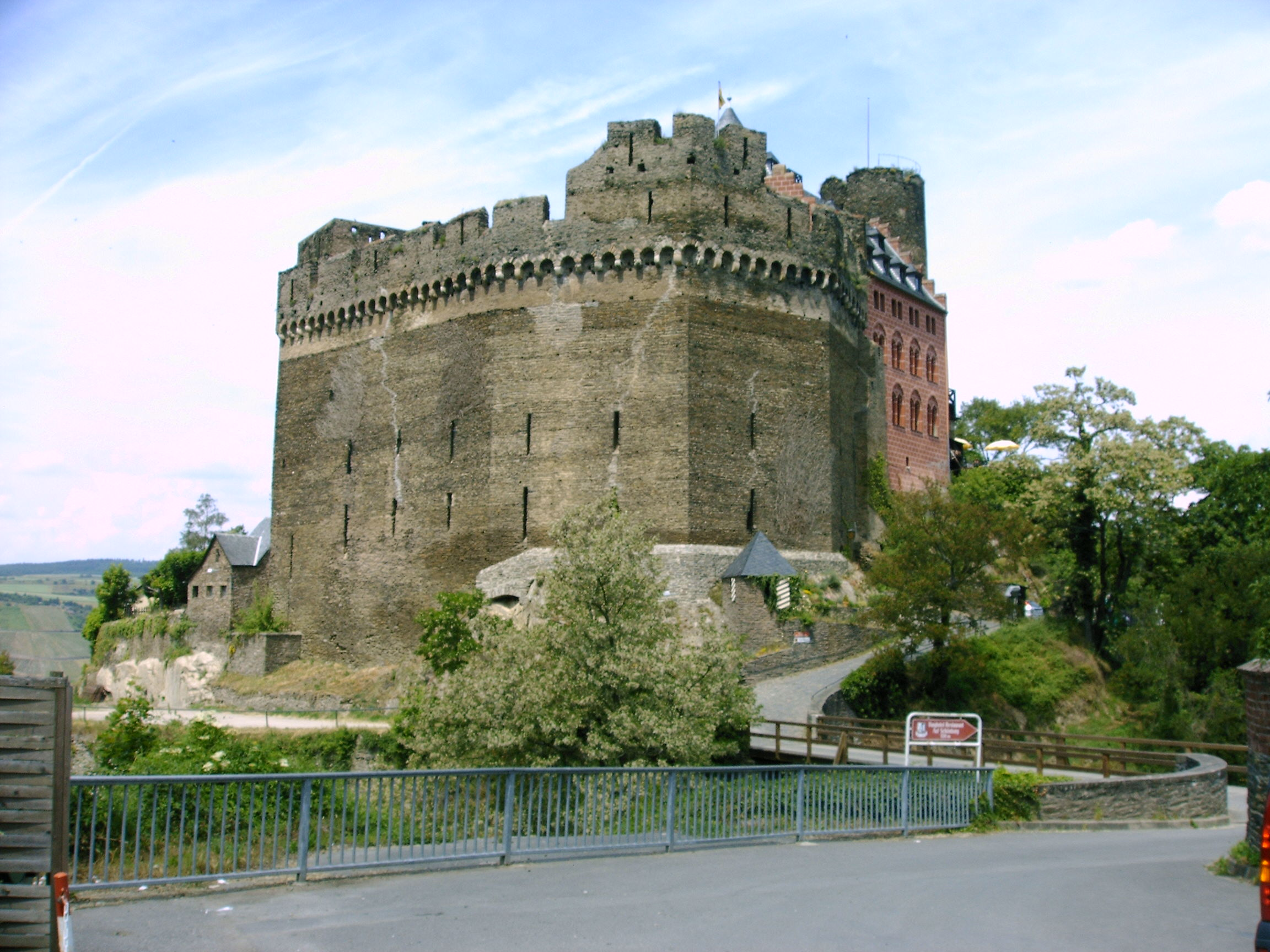
Schönburg

1. Old Castle, Boppard
2. Balduinseck Castle, Buch
3. Schloss Gemünden, Gemünden
4. Kastellaun Castle, Kastellaun
5. Koppenstein Castle, Gemünden
6. Burg Rauschenberg, Mermuth
7. Rheinfels Castle, Sankt Goar
8. Schönburg, Oberwesel
9. Schloss Schöneck, Boppard
10. Schloss Simmern, Simmern
11. Waldeck Castle, Dommershausen

== Rhein-Lahn-Kreis ==
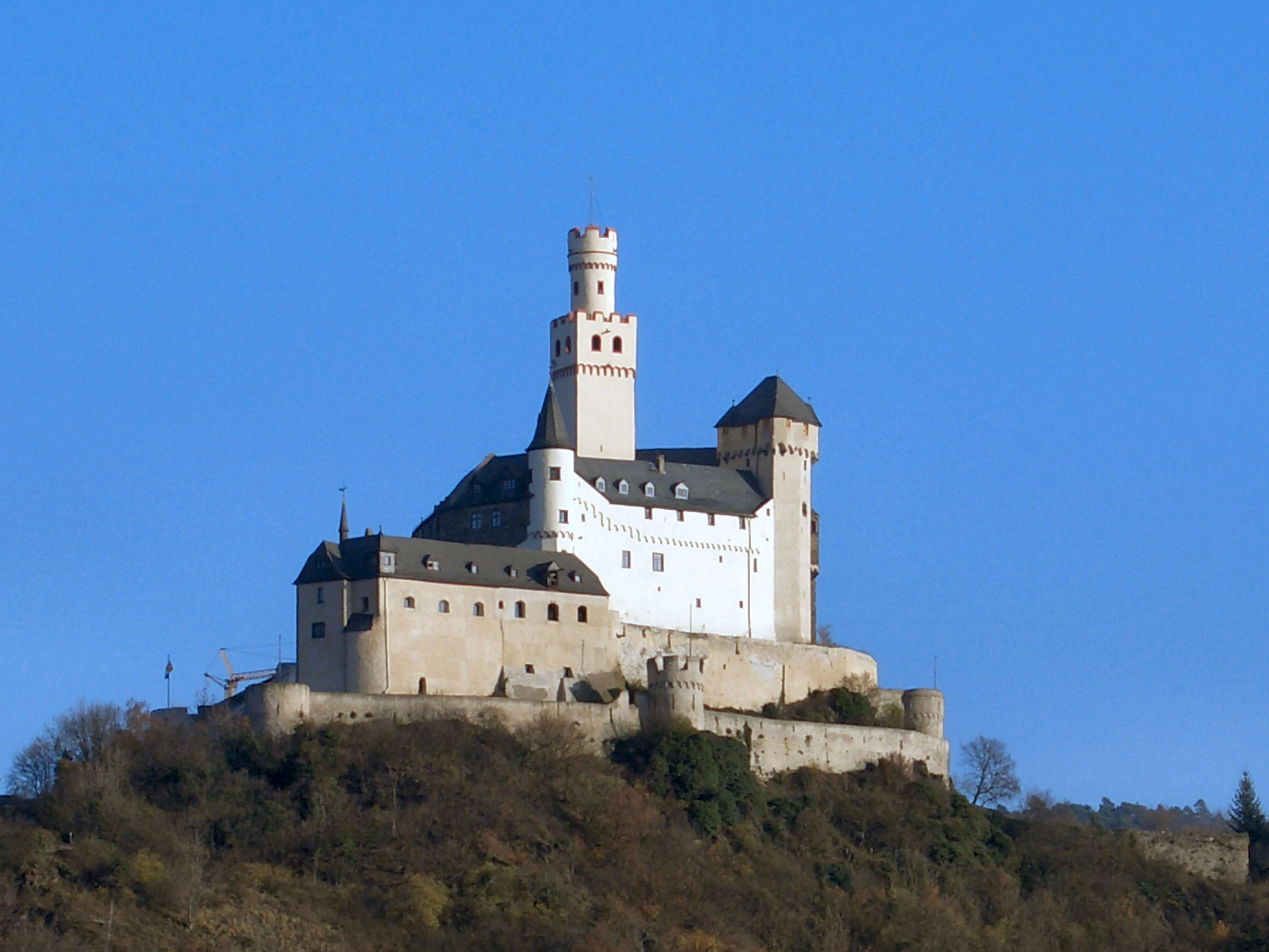
Marksburg

1. Alte Burg (Aull), Aull
2. Alte Burg (Lipporn), Lipporn
3. Ardeck Castle, Holzheim
4. Balduinstein Castle, Balduinstein
5. Grafenschloss Diez, Diez
6. Gutenfels Castle, Kaub
7. Heppenheft Castle, Niederwallmenach
8. Herzogenstein Castle, Dörscheid
9. Hohlenfels Castle, Hahnstätten
10. Schloss Karlsburg, Bad Ems
11. Katz Castle, Sankt Goarshausen
12. Schloss Katzenelnbogen, Katzenelnbogen
13. Lahneck Castle, Lahnstein
14. Laurenburg Castle, Laurenburg
15. Schloss Laurenburg, Laurenburg
16. Schloss Liebeneck, Osterspai
17. Liebenstein Castle, Kamp-Bornhofen
18. Lipporner Schanze, Lipporn
19. Marksburg, Braubach
20. Maus Castle, St. Goarshausen
21. Schloss Martinsburg, Lahnstein
22. Nassau Castle, Nassau
23. Schloss Oranienstein, Diez
24. Wasserburg Osterspai, Osterspai
25. Pfalzgrafenstein Castle, Kaub
26. Schloss Philippsburg, Braubach
27. Reichenberg Castle, Reichenberg
28. Sauerburg, Sauerthal
29. Schloss Schaumburg, Balduinstein
30. Schwalbach Castle, Burgschwalbach
31. Stein Palace, Nassau
32. Sterrenberg Castle, Kamp-Bornhofen
33. Vogtei Oberneisen, Oberneisen
34. Waldecksches Jagdschloss, Geilnau

== Rhein-Pfalz-Kreis ==
1. Gronau Castle, Rödersheim-Gronau
2. Schloss Fußgönheim, Fußgönheim
3. Schloss Kleinniedesheim, Kleinniedesheim
4. Jagdschloss Lambsheim, Lambsheim
5. Meckenheimersches Schloss, Lambsheim
6. Schloss Marientraut, Hanhofen

== Landkreis Südliche Weinstraße ==
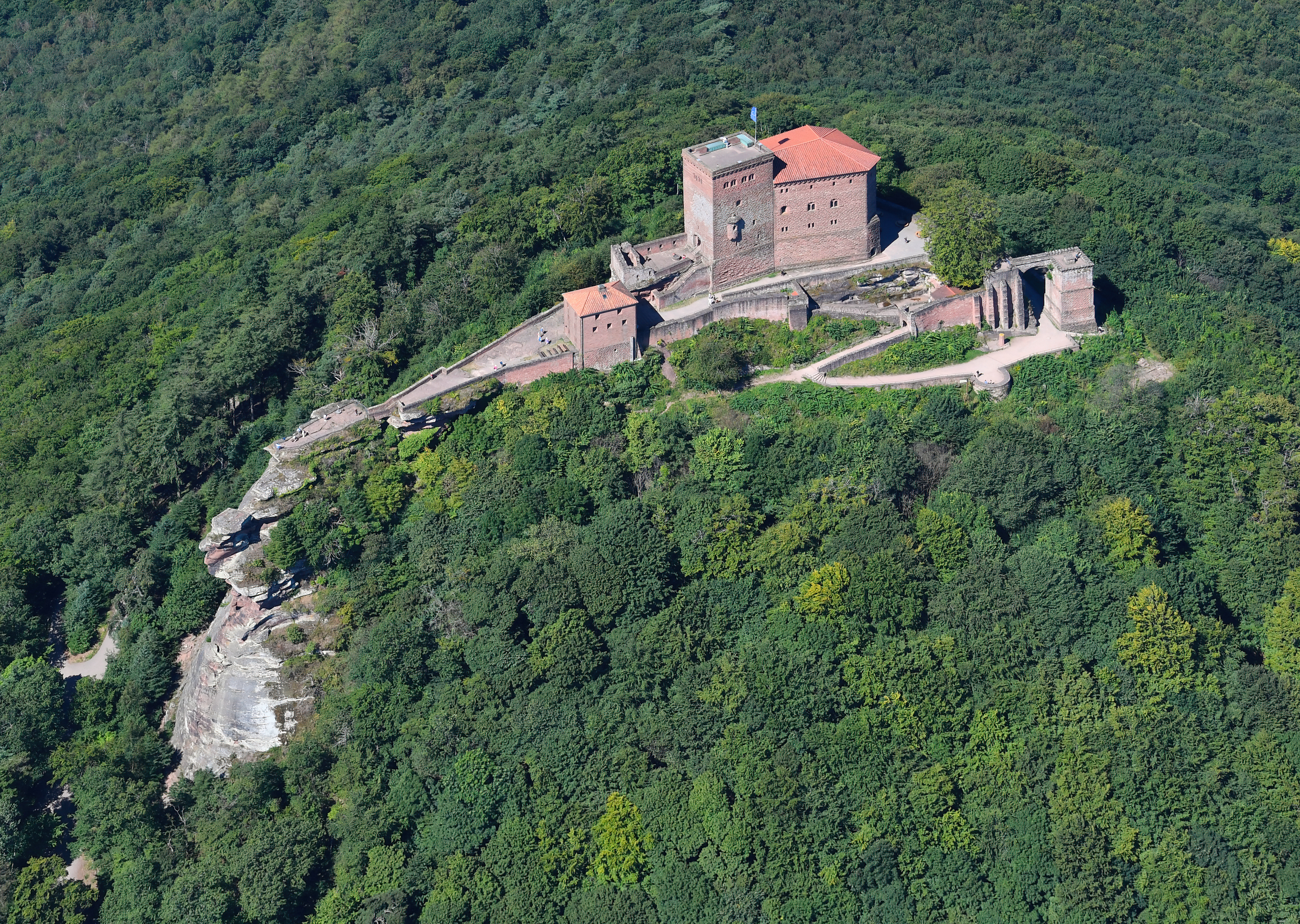
aerial view of Reichsburg Trifels

1. Anebos Castle, Leinsweiler
2. Alt-Scharfeneck Castle, Frankweiler
3. Schloss Bergzabern, Bad Bergzabern
4. Schloss Böchingen, Böchingen
5. Schloss Edesheim, Edesheim
6. Geisberg Castle, Burrweiler
7. Guttenberg Castle, Oberotterbach
8. Heidenschuh, Klingenmünster
9. Kropsburg Castle, St. Martin
10. Landeck Castle, Klingenmünster
11. Lindelbrunn Castle, Vorderweidenthal
12. Villa Ludwigshöhe, Edenkoben
13. Madenburg Castle, Eschbach
14. Meistersel Castle, Ramberg
15. Muenz Castle, Leinsweiler
16. Neukastel Castle, Leinsweiler
17. Neuscharfeneck Castle, Flemlingen
18. Ramburg Castle, Ramberg
19. Reichsburg Trifels, Annweiler (Imperial Regalia, Legend of Blondel)
20. Scharfenberg Castle, Leinsweiler
21. Rietburg Castle, Rhodt
22. Schloss Sankt Johann, Albersweiler
23. Waldschlössel, Klingenmünster
24. Wasserschloss, Pleisweiler-Oberhofen

== Landkreis Südwestpfalz ==
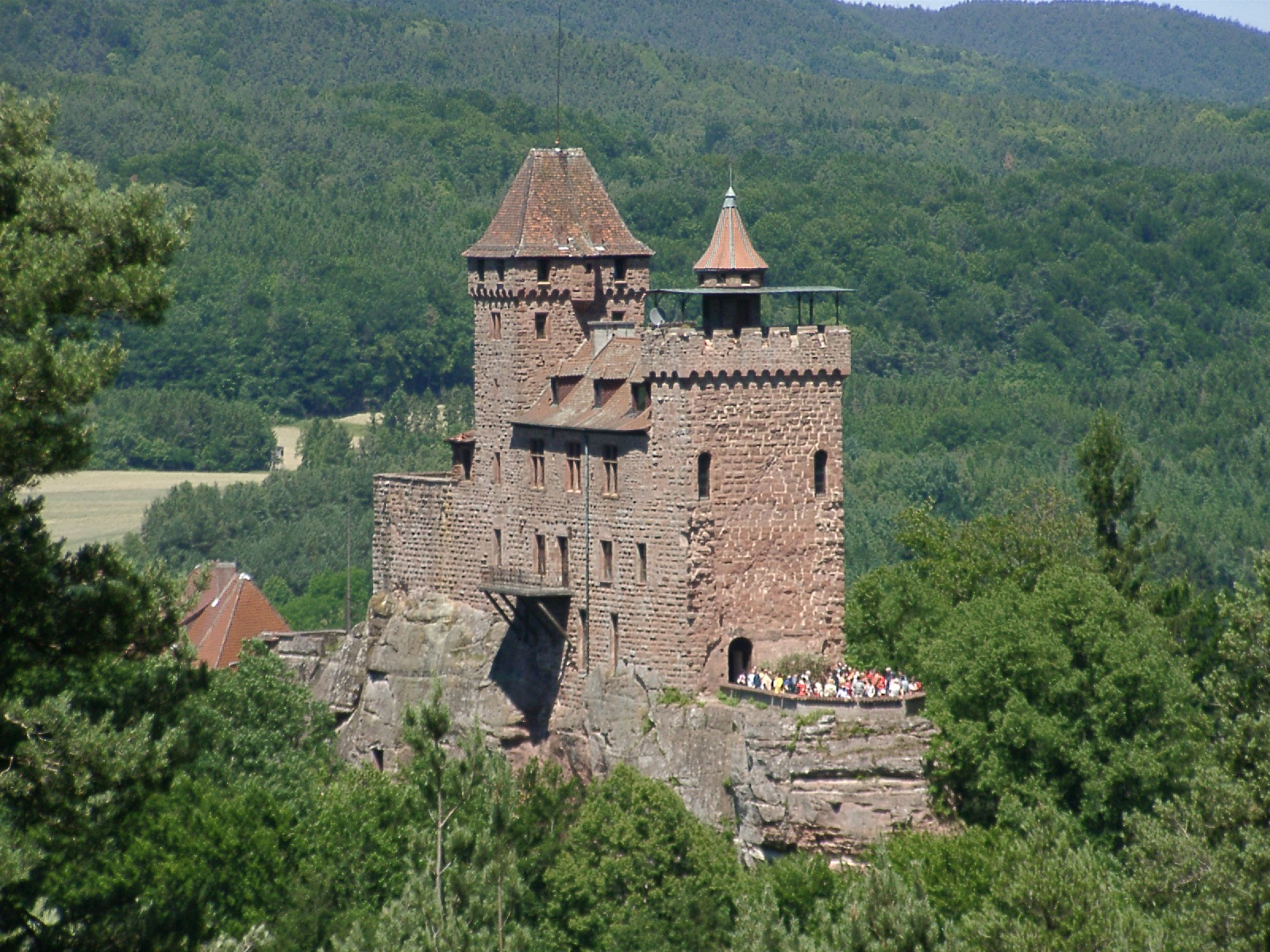
Burg Berwartstein

1. Altdahn Castle, Dahn
2. Berwartstein Castle, Erlenbach (Hans von Trotha ("Hans Trapp"))
3. Blumenstein Castle (Palatinate), Schönau
4. Burghalder Castle, Hauenstein
5. Burgschnabel Castle, Hilst
6. Drachenfels Castle, Busenberg (Franz von Sickingen)
7. Entenstein Castle, Rodalben
8. Falkenburg Castle, Wilgartswiesen
9. Grafendahn Castle, Dahn
10. Gräfenstein Castle, Merzalben
11. Bundenbach Castle, Großbundenbach
12. Heidelsburg Castle, Clausen
13. Klein-Frankreich Castle, Erlenbach
14. Lemberg Castle, Lemberg
15. Lindelskopf Castle, Fischbach bei Dahn
16. Lustschloss Monbijou, Dietrichingen
17. Neudahn Castle, Dahn
18. Ruppertstein Castle, Lemberg (Palatinate)
19. Steinenschloss Castle, Thaleischweiler-Fröschen
20. Tanstein Castle, Dahn
21. Wegelnburg Castle, Schönau (Palatinate)
22. Wiesbach Castle, Wiesbach (Palatinate)
23. Wilgartaburg Castle, Wilgartswiesen

== Landkreis Trier-Saarburg ==
1. Old Castle (Longuich), Longuich
2. Heid Castle, Lampaden
3. Osburg Castle
4. Ramstein Castle, Kordel (Eifel)
5. Kollesleuken Castle, Freudenburg
6. Sommerau Castle, Sommerau
7. Welschbillig Castle, Welschbillig
8. Wincheringen Castle
9. Grimburg, Grimburg
10. Maximiner Castle, Fell
11. Saarburg, Saarburg
12. Schloss derer von Kesselstatt, Föhren
13. Schloss Ayl
14. Schloss Föhren, Prümer Hof
15. Schloss Grünhaus, Mertesdorf
16. Schloss Marienlay, Morscheid
17. Schloss Saarfels, Serrig
18. Schloss Thorn, Palzem
19. Schloss Warsberg, Saarburg
20. Wasserburg Klüsserath

== Landkreis Vulkaneifel ==
1. Bertradaburg, Mürlenbach
2. Freudenkoppe Castle, Neroth
3. Gerolstein Castle, Gerolstein
4. Kasselburg, Pelm
5. Kerpen Castle, Kerpen
6. Lissingen Castle, Gerolstein

== Westerwaldkreis ==
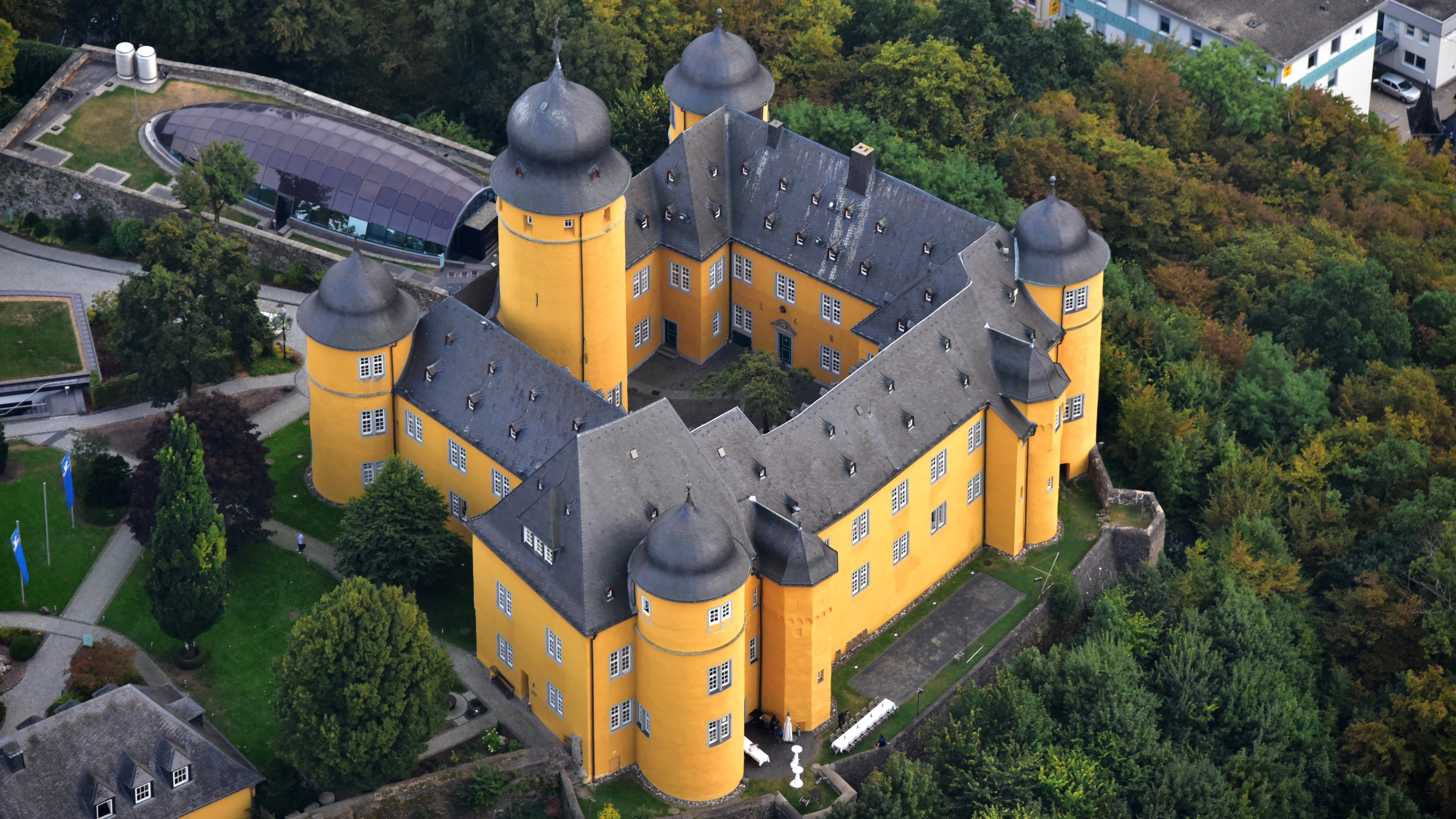
Montabaur Castle, aerial photograph (2016)

1. Grenzau Castle, Höhr-Grenzhausen
2. Schloss Hachenburg, Hachenburg
3. Hartenfels Castle, Hartenfels
4. Schloss Montabaur, Montabaur
5. Sporkenburg, Eitelborn
6. Steinebach Castle, Steinebach
7. Westerburg Castle (WW), Westerburg

== Zweibrücken ==
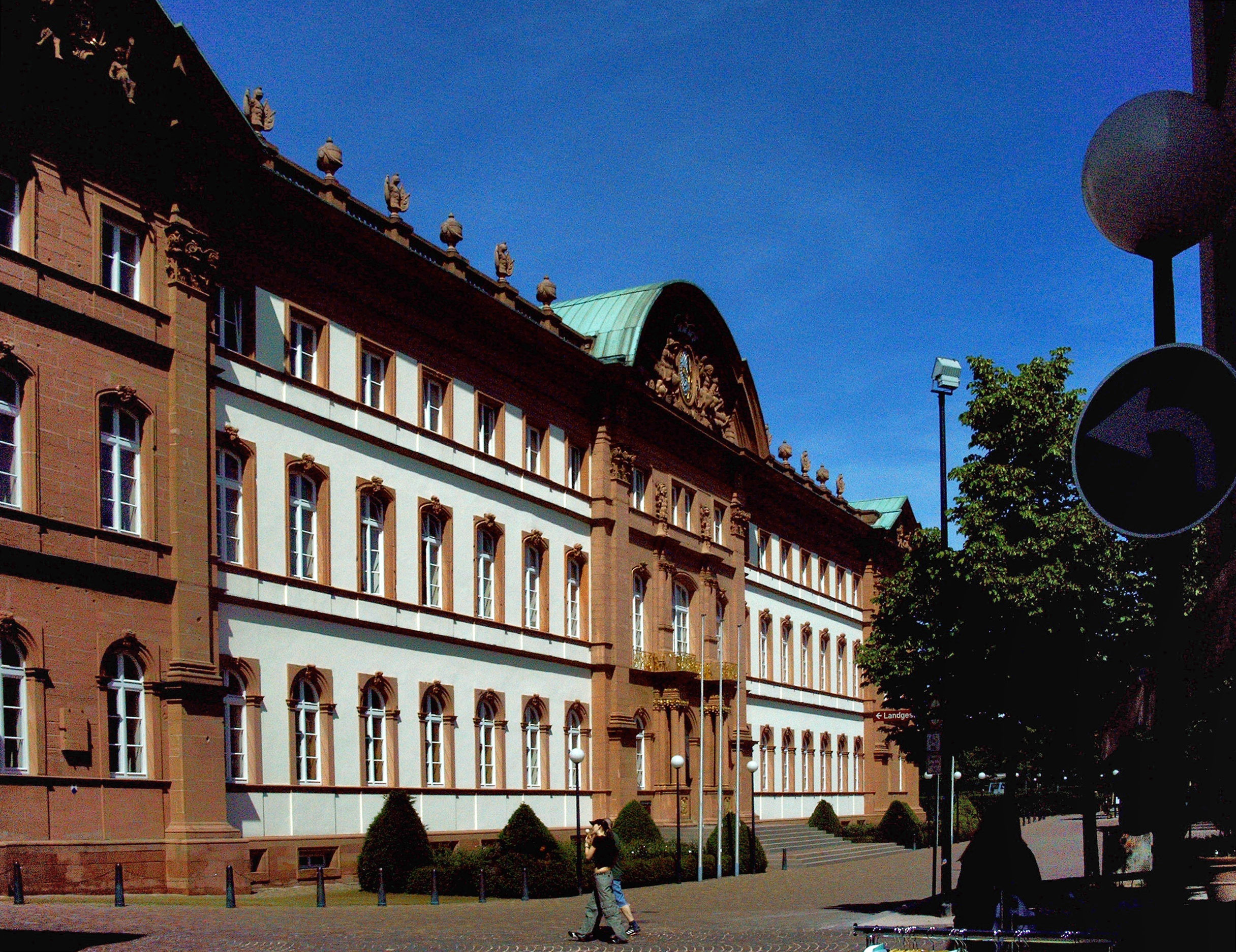
Zweibrücken Castle

1. Zweibrücken Castle

== More than one county ==
1. Siegfried Line

== See also ==
- List of castles
- List of castles in Germany

== Sources ==
- Landesamt für Denkmalpflege: Staatliche Burgen, Schlösser und Altertümer in Rhineland Pfalz. Schnell und Steiner, Mainz, 2003, ISBN 3-7954-1566-7
- Krahe, Friedrich-Wilhelm: Burgen des Deutschen Mittelalters. Bechtermünz Verlag, Augsburg, 1996 ISBN 3-86047-219-4
- Reisezeit Zeitreise - zu den schönsten Schlössern, Burgen, Gärten, Klöstern und Römerbauten in Deutschland. Verlag Schnell & Steiner GmbH, Regensburg, 1999
- Die deutschen Burgen und Schlösser. S. Fischer Verlag GmbH, Frankfurt am Main, 1987, ISBN 3-8105-0228-6
