= Burg Liebenstein =

Burg Liebenstein is the name of a number of castles:

- Burg Liebenstein (Thuringia), Liebenstein, Ilm-Kreis in Thuringia
- Burg Liebenstein (Rhein), Kamp-Bornhofen in Rhineland-Palatinate
- Burg Liebenstein (Bayern) bei Plößberg in Bavaria
- Burgstall Liebenstein, Bad Kötzting in Bayern
- Burg Liebenstein (Wartburgkreis) bei Bad Liebenstein in Thuringia
- Burg Liebenstein (Tschechien) in Libá (Liebenstein) bei Eger (Cheb) in Czech Republic
