= Welschbillig Castle =

Castle ruins in Rhineland-Palatinate

- Burg Welschbillig
- Welschbillig
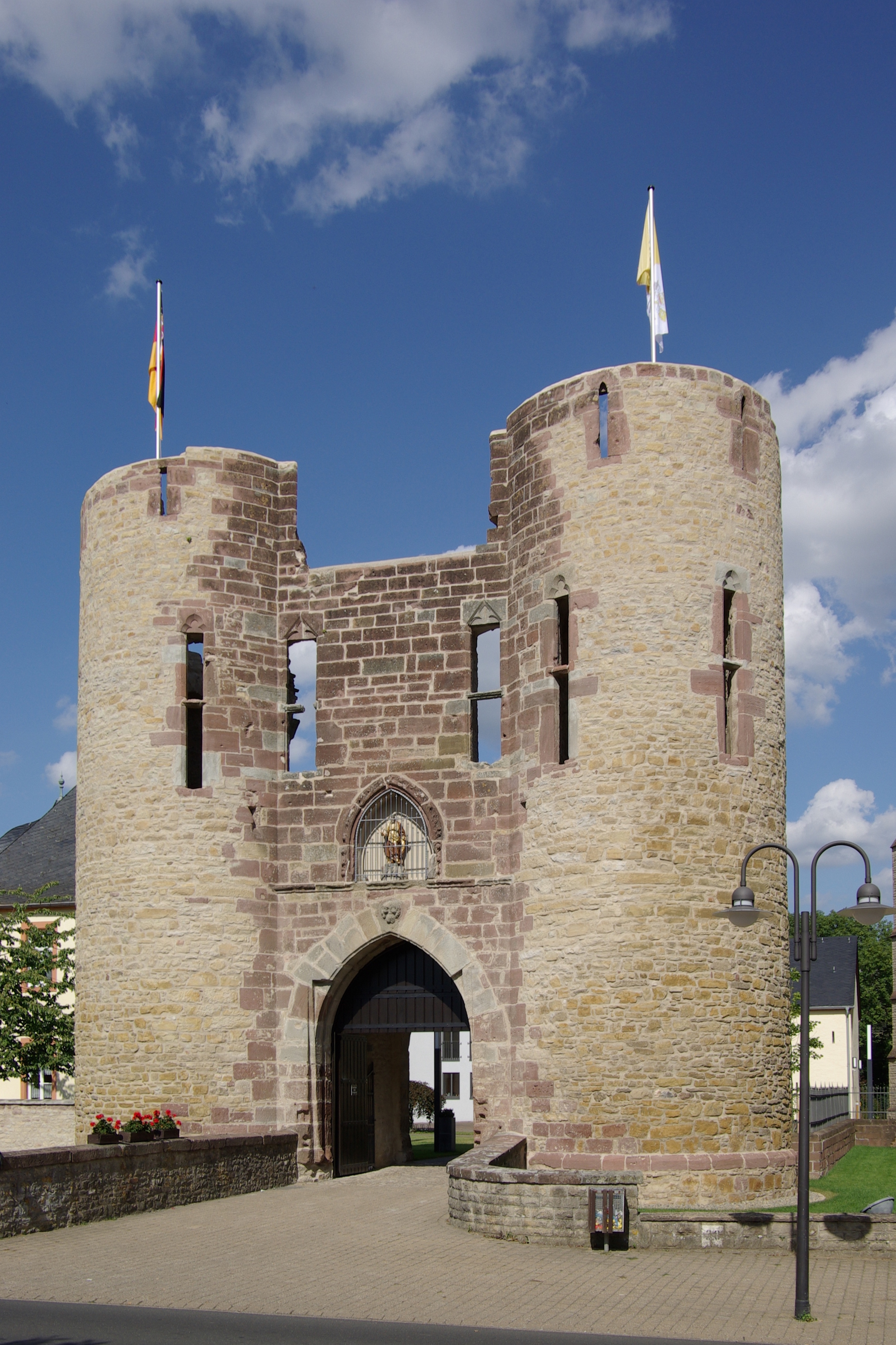
- Castle gateway

Site information
- Type: lowland castle
- Code: DE-RP
- Condition: ruin

Location
- Coordinates: 49°51′12″N 6°34′07″E
- Height: 290 m above sea level (NHN)

Site history
- Built: around 1140

Garrison information
- Occupants: clergy

Welschbillig Castle (German: Burg Welschbillig) is the ruin of a water castle in the municipality of Welschbillig in the county of Trier-Saarburg in the German state of Rhineland-Palatinate.

== History ==
As early as the 12th century there was a small predecessor castle on the site of a former Roman villa rustica from the 2nd to 4th century in the present village of Welschbillig.

From 1242 to 1299 the fortifications of the castle were significantly strengthened by the Prince-Elector of Trier, Arnold II of Isenburg and, later, the Landesburg was further expanded by his successors. During the so-called Dutch War the castle was destroyed in 1673/74 by troops of the French "sun king" Louis XIV and from 1889 to 1891 the southern side was demolished to build a church.

== Site ==
The castle built over the remains of the Roman villa survive today as the remains of a large, quadrangular castle with moats. Still visible are the gateway with its two round towers, a stone bridge over the moat and the remains of the northwest tower.

The Roman villa was built in the shape of the letter "U" next to a 58.3 by 17.8 metre water basin, which was originally surrounded 112 hermas. 71 of the hermas may be seen in the Rheinisches Landesmuseum Trier.

Views with church

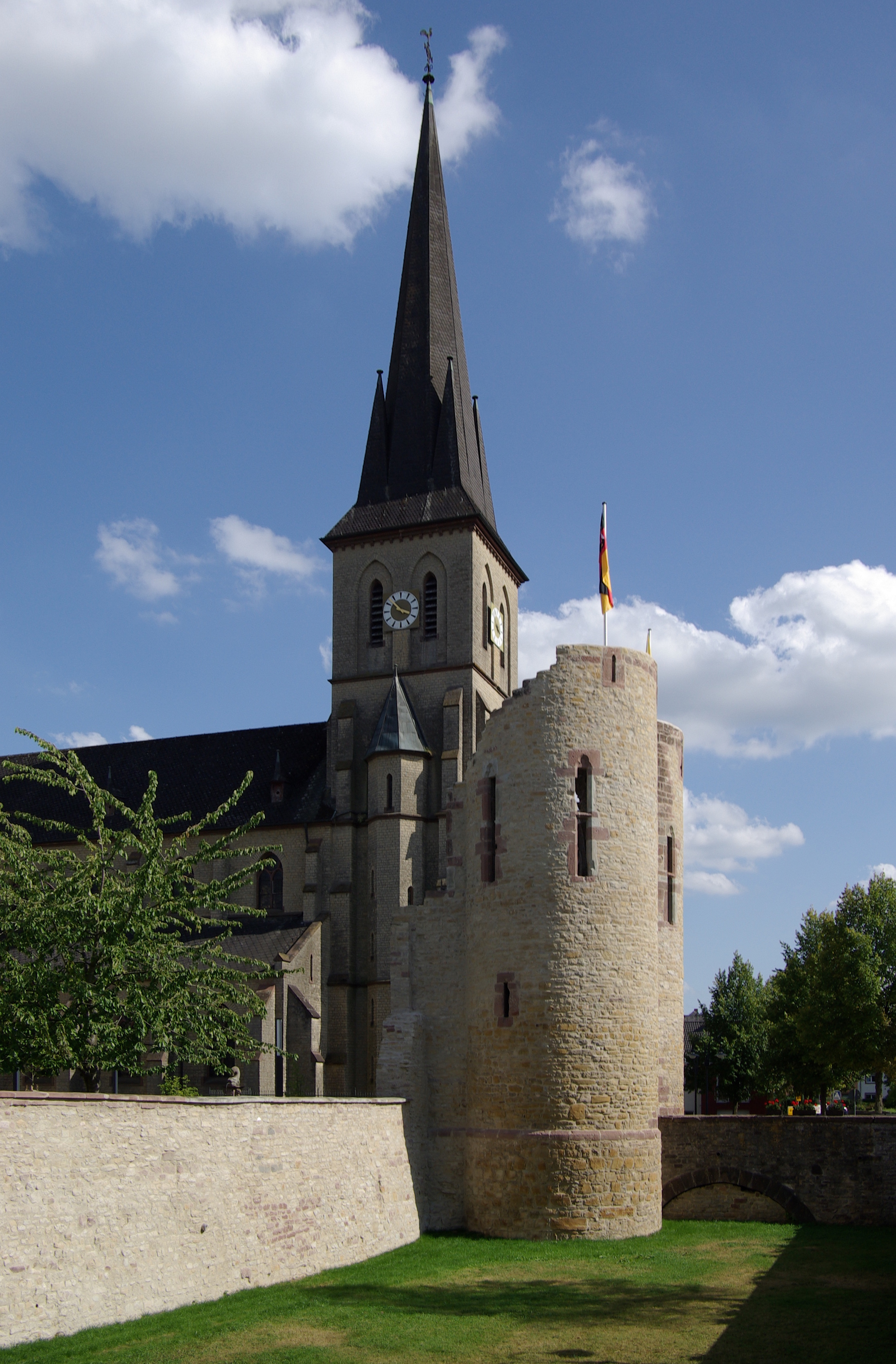

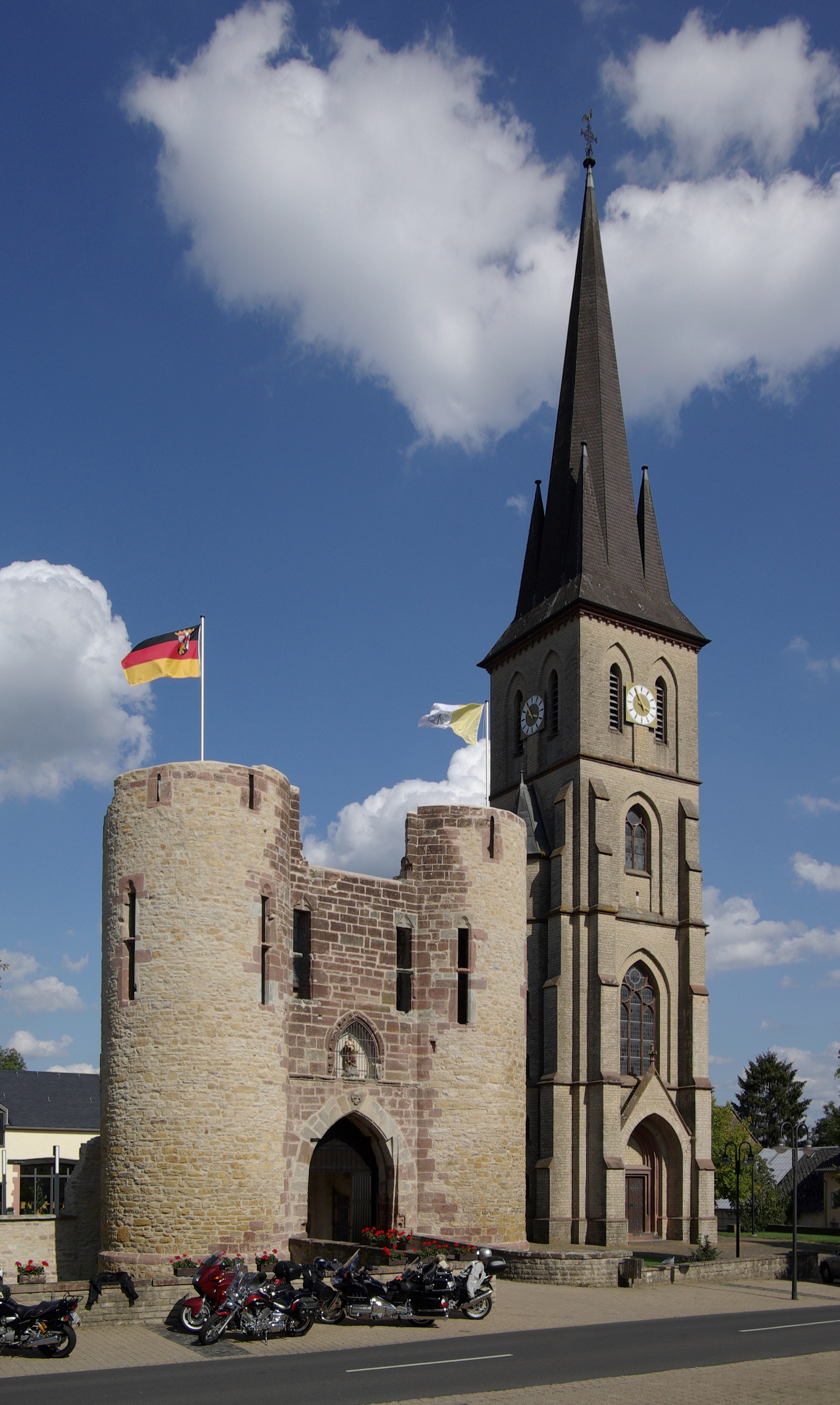

== Literature ==
- Bernhard Gondorf (1984). Die Burgen der Eifel und ihrer Randgebiete. Ein Lexikon der "festen Häuser" [The castles of the Eifel and its outskirts. A dictionary of "solid houses"] (in German). Cologne: J. P. Bachem. p. 176. ISBN 3-7616-0723-7.
