= Blumenstein Castle, Palatinate =

Blumenstein Castle
- Burg Blumenstein, Der Blumenstein
- Schönau (Pfalz)
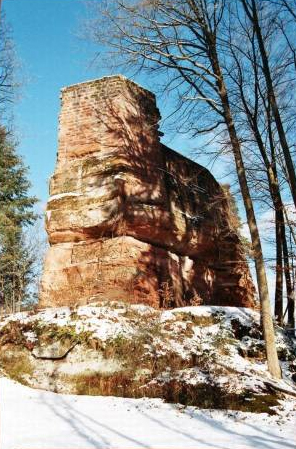
- The ruins of Blumenstein Castle in winter

Site information
- Type: Höhenburg, Felslage
- Code: DE-RP
- Condition: ruin

Location
- Coordinates: 49°03′27″N 7°42′49″E
- Height: 361 m above sea level (NHN)

Site history
- Built: c. 1260

Garrison information
- Occupants: Adel

Blumenstein Castle is a castle ruin in the Palatinate Forest in Rhineland-Palatinate, Germany. According to the State of Rhineland-Palatinate, Blumenstein castle was probably constructed in the first half of the 13th century as part of a line of defensive castles along the Alsatian border.

== History ==
The castle was first mentioned in 1332 in connection with Lord Anselm of Batzendorf and Blumenstein. After a feud with the House of Fleckenstein in 1347, the knight was banished from the castle.

About 1350, the counts of Zweibrücken had one fourth of the castle, the House of Dahn owned the rest. Blumenstein Castle was probably destroyed during the German Peasants' War in 1525. The ruin passed from the counts of Hanau-Lichtenberg to the landgraves of Hesse, then to the Bishopric of Speyer and finally to the state of Rhineland-Palatinate. The State Office of Castles, Palaces and Antiquities installed safety measures (such as railings along stairways and around the cliff edges) in the 1970s.

== Description ==
"Blumenstein Castle, situated in magnificent loneliness, at a height of about 500 meters [1,600 ft], presents, even today, one of the most unspoilt impressions of its kind." The castle sits upon the top of a narrow red sandstone pier about 6.1 metres (20 ft) wide and 46 metres (150 ft) long, about 24 metres (80 ft) above the hilltop. Parts of the castle, including the narrow stairways, are carved directly into the red sandstone. "Prior to the invention of firearms, it was hardly possible to capture this picturesque castle hidden in the middle of the forest. It was necessary to siege it and starve its inhabitants out."

== Literature ==
- Marco Bollheimer (2011), Felsenburgen im Burgenparadies Wasgau–Nordvogesen (in German) (3. ed.), Karlsruhe, pp. 84 f, ISBN 978-3-9814506-0-6
- Walter Herrmann (2004), Auf rotem Fels : Ein Führer zu den schönsten Burgen der Pfalz und des elsässischen Wasgau (in German), Leinfelden-Echterdingen: G. Braun Buchverlag, pp. 24–27, ISBN 3-7650-8286-4
- Jürgen Keddigkeit; Alexander Thon; Karl Scherer; Rolf Übel, Pfälzisches Burgenlexikon (in German), vol. Band 1: A-E (2. ed.), Kaiserslautern: Institut für pfälzische Geschichte und Volkskunde Kaiserslautern, pp. 289–299, ISBN 3-927754-51-X
- Friedrich Knöpp: Territorialbestand der Grafschaft Hanau-Lichtenberg hessen-darmstädtischen Anteils. Darmstadt 1962. [in the Hessian State Archives, Darmstadt (Hessisches Staatsarchiv Darmstadt), Signatur: N 282/6].
- Alexander Thon, ed. (2005), …wie eine gebannte, unnahbare Zauberburg : Burgen in der Südpfalz (in German) (2. ed.), Regensburg: Schnell und Steiner, pp. 34–37, ISBN 3-7954-1570-5
