= Alt-Scharfeneck Castle =

Coordinates: 49°14′07″N 8°03′07″E

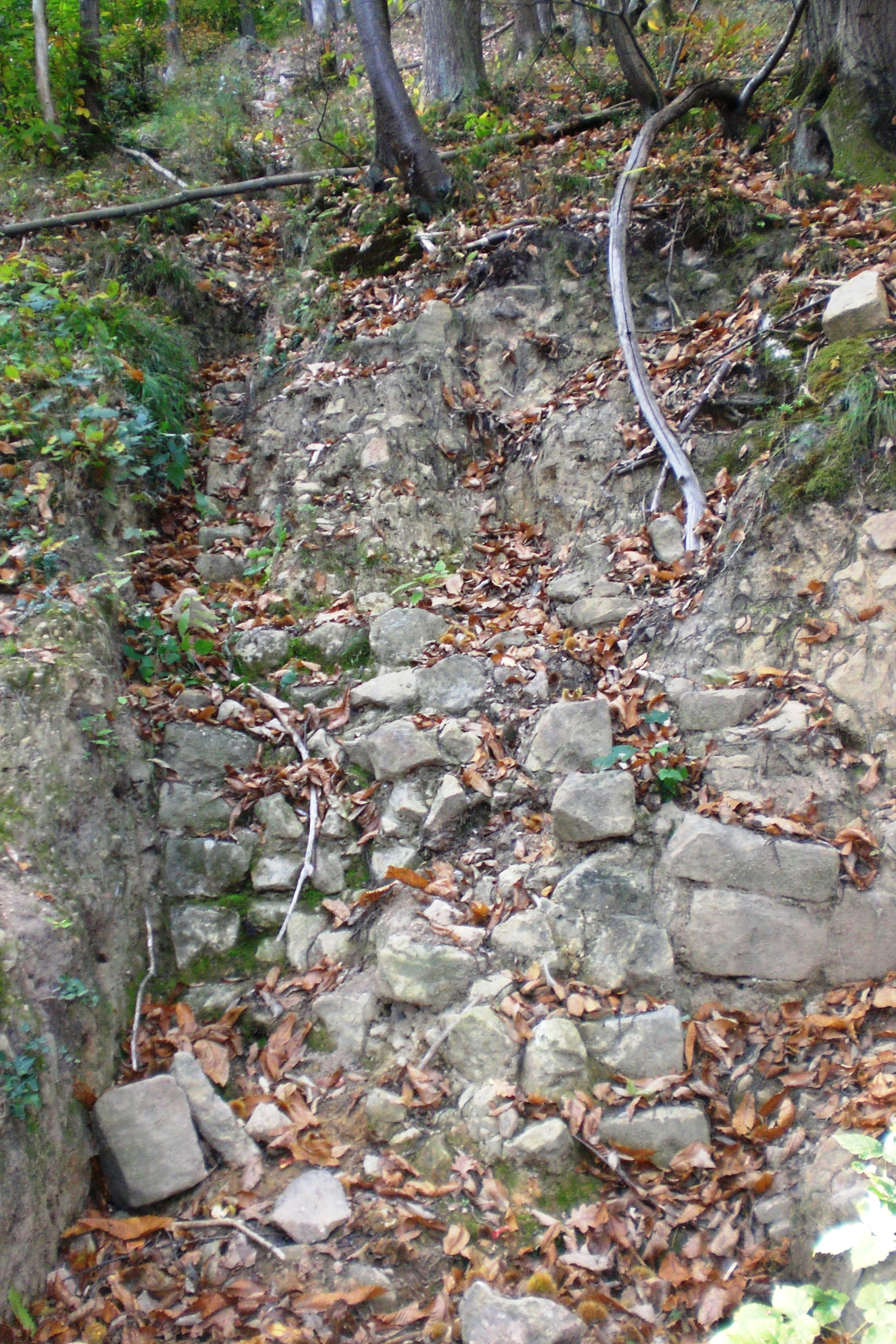

Alt-Scharfeneck Castle is a castle ruin on the outskirts of the Palatinate Forest near Leinsweiler in the district Südliche Weinstrasse in Rhineland-Palatinate, Germany.

The remnants of this castle are located on a height of 363 meters.

== Location ==
Being a rock castle, the few remains of the old castle are on a rocky spur, 363 metres (1,191 ft) high, on the north-eastern end of the Ringelbergstrasse at the entrance to the grove creek valley in the southern Palatinate Forest. The completion date was around 1100–1130 AD and most likely as a feudal seat. In today's maps the terrain is listed only as an "artificial embankment"

== History ==
Presumably, the castle was built during the time of the Salian emperors in the first third of the 12th century. The findings obtained in Gottfried Decker Frankweiler's excavations allow a dating to the time of the Salian dynasty. This contradicts previous assumptions that the castle was built on order of Emperor Frederick Barbarossa to protect the Trifels and in 1219 passed into the possession of Henry I " the Old " of Scharfeneck, who named himself after the castle. Subsequent owners that took over starting in 1232 were his two sons, Henry " the elder " and Henry " the Younger ".

Nearly two hundred years later, in 1416, the castle was left to decay, since it was completely dismantled for the new castle Neuscharfeneck. Only in the 1950s further foundations were rediscovered during excavations. There were three different wall remains uncovered, their outer shells were made of a typical quad-engine Salian masonry. Since the ruined wall was built with mortar instead of clay, it also points to Salian builders (Comparable masonry at Trifels Anebos and on Schloessel at Klingenmünster). )

Also found at Wiligartaburg were similar ceramics which have an earlier construction than previously thought, too. These findings do not exclude, of course, that which had been of Scharfenberg/Scharfeneck origin in their time in possession of the castle. The castle was most probably abandoned before the end of the 14th century and left to decay.

In 1830, the ancestors of the current owners have - the castle grounds is privately owned - rebuilt fortresses around the area using the remains of much of the north-eastern wall as well as other parts of the old castle.
