= Trutzbingen =

- Part of Rhine Gorge
- Münster-Sarmsheim

Site information
- Type: Round tower
- Condition: Ruin

Location
- Shown within Rhineland-Palatinate, Germany Trutzbingen (Germany)
- Coordinates: 49°57′14″N 7°53′39″E

Site history
- Built: 1493
- Demolished: 1504

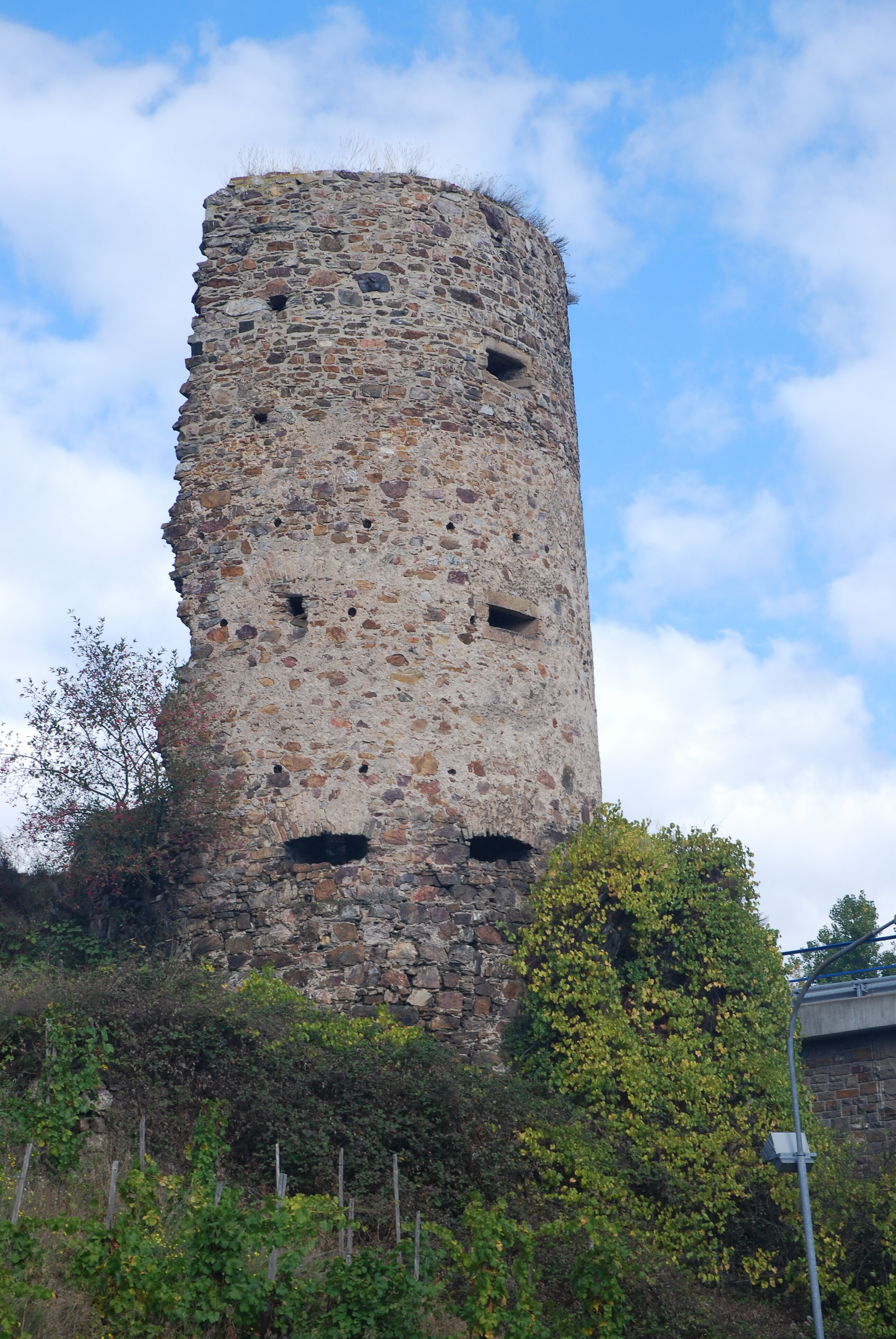
Trutzbingen round tower

Trutzbingen is the ruin of a round tower on the road leaving Münster-Sarmsheim in the direction of Bingen am Rhein, Rhineland-Palatinate, Germany. It is the remnant of a tariff barrier, which was built in 1493. Only one half of the outer wall of the round tower remains. Since 2002, Trutzbingen has been part of the UNESCO World Heritage Site Rhine Gorge.

== History ==
After a fire destroyed a large part of Bingen in 1490, the city authorities tried to raise money to repair the city by levying a market fee. Fees were also collected from Münster-Sarmsheim and other towns in the Palatinate. The citizens of Münster-Sarmsheim logged a complaint, and when this was unsuccessful, they turned to Elector Philip the Righteous. He gave Münster-Sarmsheim the privilege to have its own weekly market. In 1493, this market was protected by a customs barrier, consisting of a walled area with a pier and a round tower built on a hill.

In 1504, during the War of the Palatinate Succession, Landgrave William II of Hesse attacked Münster-Sarmsheim. He fired cannon at the city and set it on fire. He demolished the customs barrier and blew up the walls of the round tower in the direction of Bingen.
