= Holsthum =

- Municipality
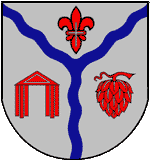
- Coat of arms

- Location of Holsthum within Eifelkreis Bitburg-Prüm district
- Interactive map of Holsthum
- Location within Germany Location within Rhineland-Palatinate
- Coordinates: 49°53′30″N 06°24′48″E
- Country: Germany
- State: Rhineland-Palatinate
- District: Eifelkreis Bitburg-Prüm
- Municipal assoc.: Südeifel

Government
  - Mayor (2019–24): Klaus Reschke

Area
  - Total: 9.31 km^{2} (3.59 sq mi)
- Elevation: 210 m (690 ft)

Population (2025-12-31)
  - Total: 619
  - Density: 66.5/km^{2} (172/sq mi)
- Time zone: UTC+01:00 (CET)
  - Summer (DST): UTC+02:00 (CEST)
- Postal codes: 54668
- Dialling codes: 06523
- Vehicle registration: BIT
- Website: holsthum.de

Holsthum is a municipality in the district of Bitburg-Prüm, in Rhineland-Palatinate, western Germany.

== Sights ==
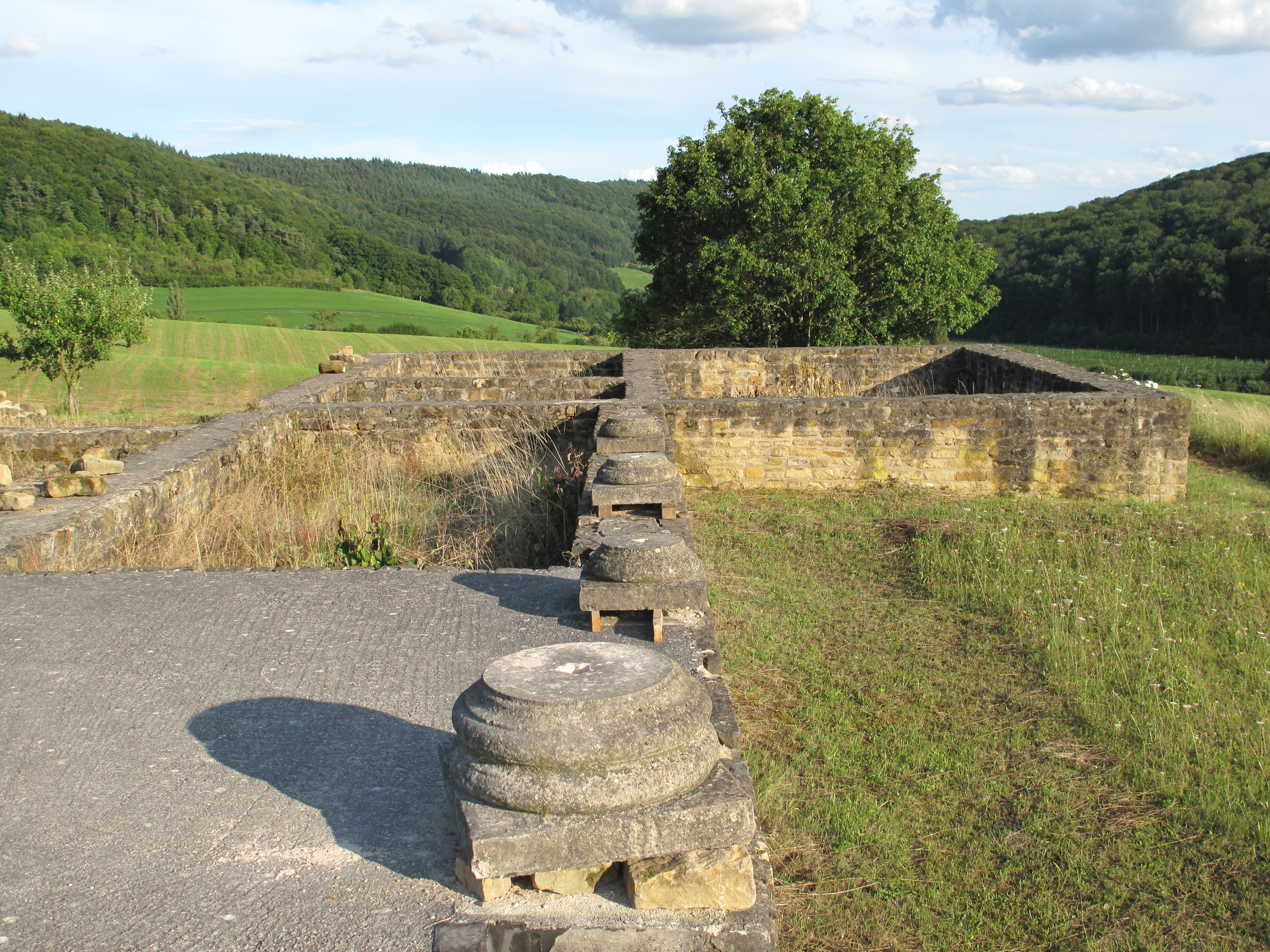
Holsthum, Roman villa (2012).

- Roman villa
- Schloss Holsthum
- St. Rochus Chapel
- Old glassworks
- Military cemetery
