= Wegelnburg =

Coordinates: 49.061°N 7.787°E

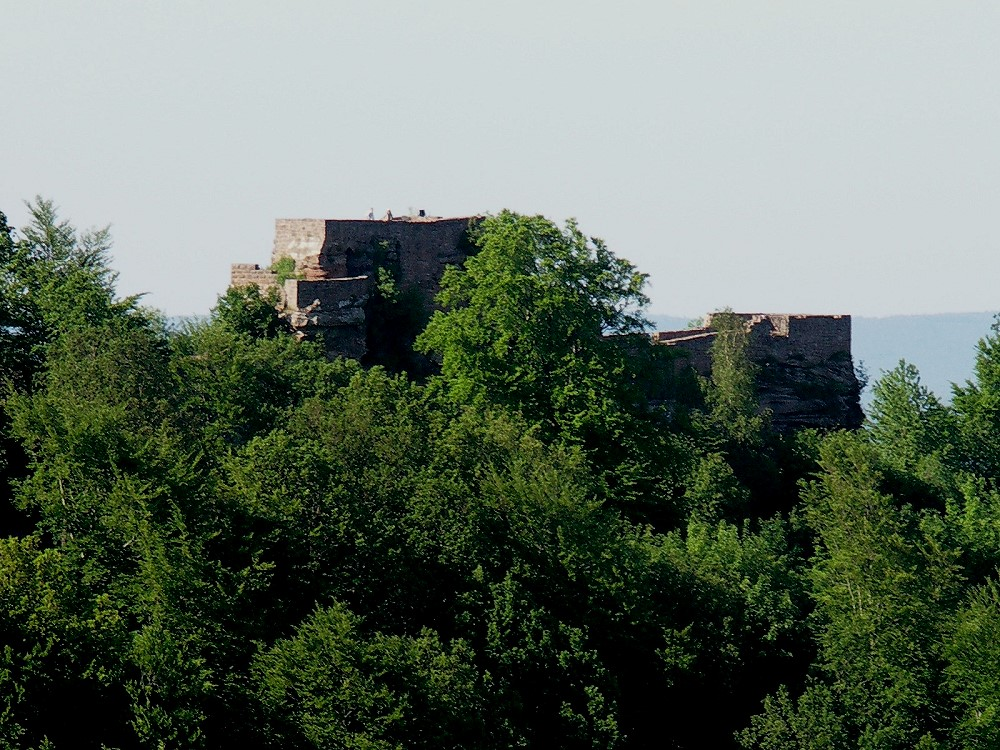
Remains of the Wegelnburg

The Wegelnburg is a ruined castle near Schönau in the Palatinate Forest in Rhineland-Palatinate, Germany, near the border with France. Its location is at a height of 572m, making it the highest ruined castle in the Palatinate Forest.

Wegelnburg was founded by the Hohenstaufens in the 12th or 13th century. It had to protect the border of the Hohenstaufens’ territory. The castle is named after a vassal of the emperor "B. de Woeglenburc" whose name appears for the first time in 1247. In 1272, the castle was destroyed because the castellan had committed a breach of the peace. The von Wegelnburg family rebuilt the castle.

In 1330 the Wegelnburg was pawned to the Palatinate and in 1417 it was given to the Duchy of Zweibrücken through barter. Because of the Treaty of Nijmegen the castle was destroyed by French troops under General Monclar in 1679. Owned by the Palatinate and then by Bavaria, the Wegelnburg was given to Rhineland-Palatinate and has been administered by its Castles Administration since 1963. During the restoration work from 1979 until 1982 the remains of the castle were saved and large amounts of rubble were removed. It was restored in the last years and finally reopened this 2023.

Wegelnburg Castle was divided into three wards: a lower, middle and upper bailey, the lower bailey only being established on the western side. The internal gateway has been preserved and restored. Rock staircases, hewn into the sandstone rock, enable access to the upper ward. Niches, various timber holes, another stair and some renewed arches can be seen in the lower and middle wards.

The foundation walls on the sandstone rock are remarkable because of the smooth transition of the wall and the rock. Together with the rock caves they belong to the upper and middle bailey.
