= Wierschem =

- Municipality
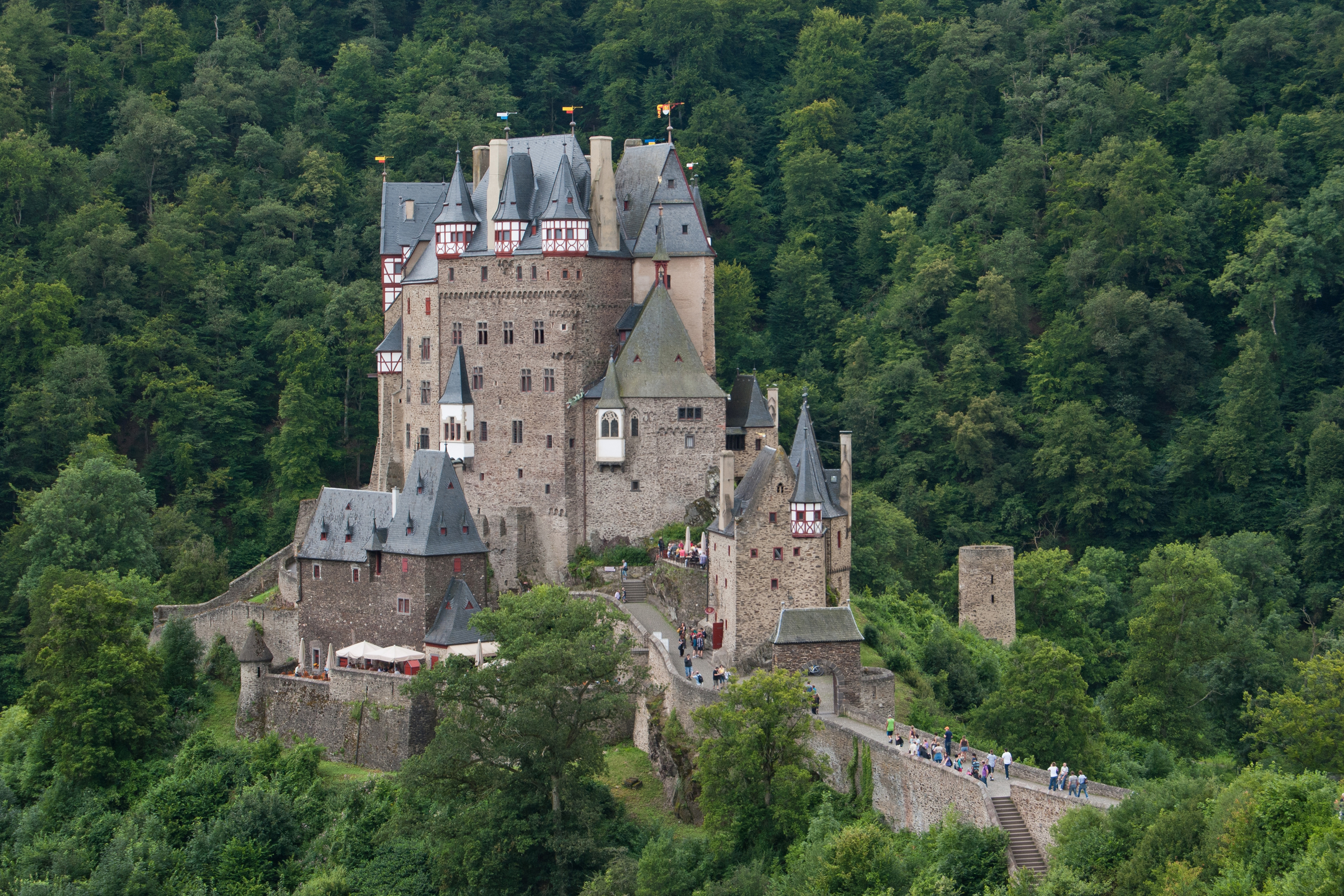
- Eltz Castle

- Coat of arms

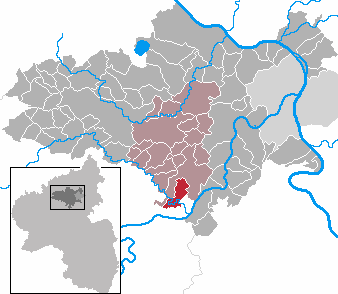
- Location of Wierschem within Mayen-Koblenz district
- Interactive map of Wierschem
- Location within Germany Location within Rhineland-Palatinate
- Coordinates: 50°13′37″N 7°21′14″E
- Country: Germany
- State: Rhineland-Palatinate
- District: Mayen-Koblenz
- Municipal assoc.: Maifeld

Government
  - Mayor (2019–24): Michael Kopp

Area
  - Total: 8.32 km^{2} (3.21 sq mi)
- Elevation: 250 m (820 ft)

Population (2025-12-31)
  - Total: 337
  - Density: 40.5/km^{2} (105/sq mi)
- Time zone: UTC+01:00 (CET)
  - Summer (DST): UTC+02:00 (CEST)
- Postal codes: 56294
- Dialling codes: 02605
- Vehicle registration: MYK
- Website: www.wierschem.de

Wierschem is a municipality in the district of Mayen-Koblenz in Rhineland-Palatinate, western Germany.
