= Frankenstein, Rhineland-Palatinate =

Frankenstein
- Municipality
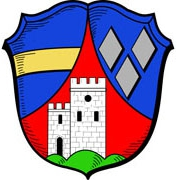
- Coat of arms

- Location of Frankenstein within Kaiserslautern district
- Interactive map of Frankenstein
- Location within Germany Location within Rhineland-Palatinate
- Coordinates: 49°26′24″N 7°58′41″E
- Country: Germany
- State: Rhineland-Palatinate
- District: Kaiserslautern
- Municipal assoc.: Enkenbach-Alsenborn

Government
  - Mayor (2019–24): Eckhard Vogel

Area
  - Total: 13.8 km^{2} (5.3 sq mi)
- Elevation: 242 m (794 ft)

Population (2025-12-31)
  - Total: 914
  - Density: 66.2/km^{2} (172/sq mi)
- Time zone: UTC+01:00 (CET)
  - Summer (DST): UTC+02:00 (CEST)
- Postal codes: 67468
- Dialling codes: 06329
- Vehicle registration: KL
- Website: www.frankenstein.de

Frankenstein (German pronunciation: [ˈfʁaŋkn̩ˌʃtaɪn]) is a municipality in the district of Kaiserslautern, in Rhineland-Palatinate, western Germany. On a hill towering over the village is Frankenstein Castle. Frankenstein (Pfalz) station is located on the Mannheim–Saarbrücken railway.
