= Schloss Holsthum =

Coordinates: 49°53′29.8″N 6°24′39.8″E

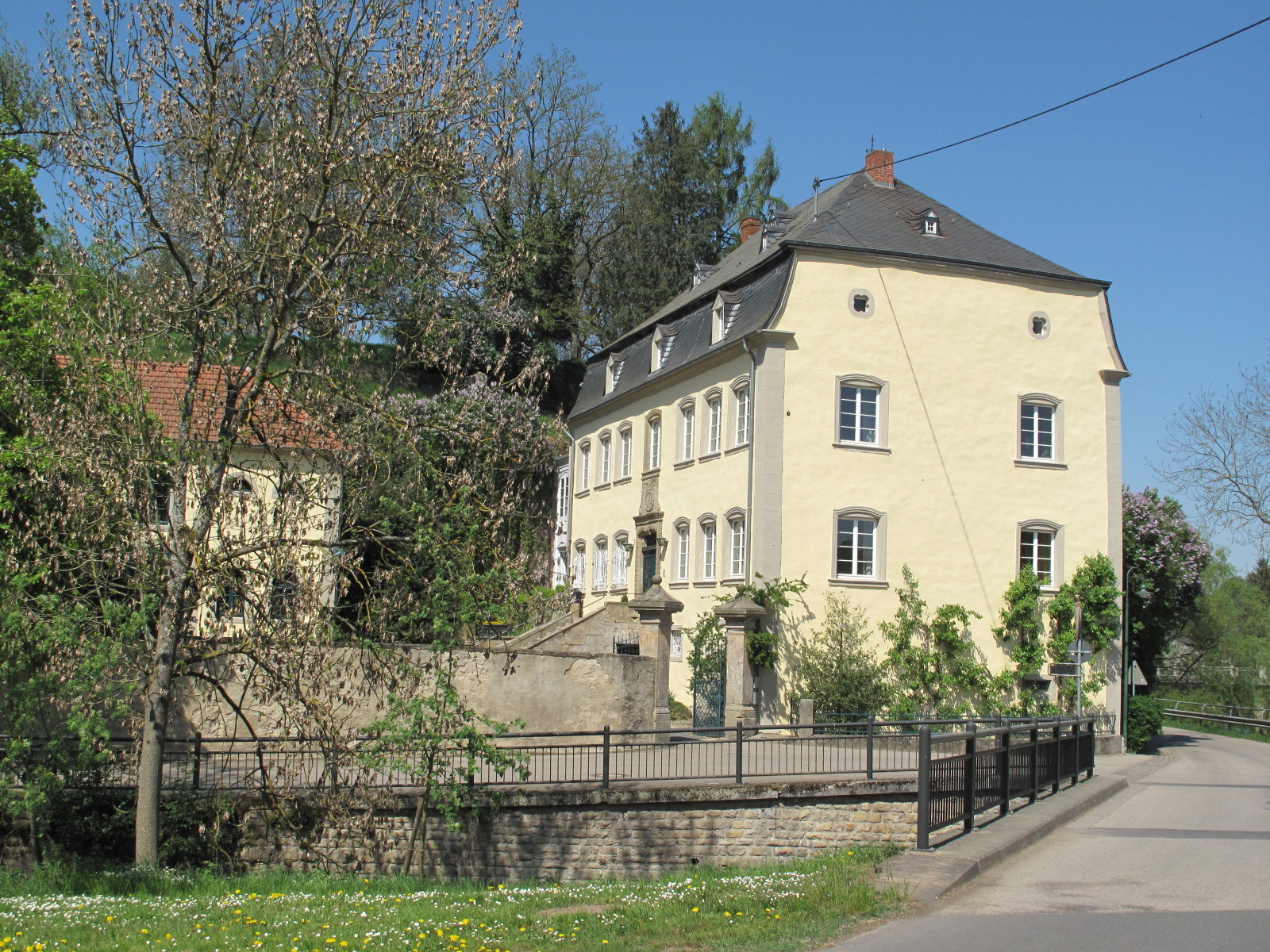
Schloss Holsthum (2011)

Schloss Holsthum, also called Herrenhaus Laeis, is a manor house in the municipality of Holsthum in the county of Eifelkreis Bitburg-Prüm in the German state of Rhineland-Palatinate. It is a cultural monument and listed building.

The present manor house is a building with eight axes of symmetry with rendered walls, a slate-covered half-hipped mansard roof. It was built in 1789 by officiant (Herrschaftsverwalter or manager of a noble estate), Johann Dominik Laeis, and his son, Matthias Dominik Laeis, by permission of the baroness, Maria Theresia of Eltz-Rodendorf. In the 15th century, the family of Nickenich lived at Holsthum, from 1496 the Burscheid line of the lords of Metternich. From 1753 the Freiherr, Schenk von Schmidtburg, was the owner of the Holsthum estate.

The house was given a careful renovation in 2010.

== Literature ==
- Bernd Altmann; Hans Caspary (1997), Kreis Bitburg-Prüm. Stadt Bitburg, Verbandsgemeinden Bitburg-Land und Irrel (in German), vol. 9, Worms: Werner, pp. 464–467, ISBN 3-88462-132-7
- Georg Dehio: Handbuch der deutschen Kunstdenkmäler. Rheinland-Pfalz Saarland. 2. Auflage. Deutscher Kunstverlag, Berlin [u. a.] 1984, ISBN 3-422-00382-7.
