= Frankenstein Castle, Palatinate =

Medieval fortification in Germany

Coordinates: 49.4388°N 7.9750°E

Frankenstein Castle
- Near Frankenstein in Germany
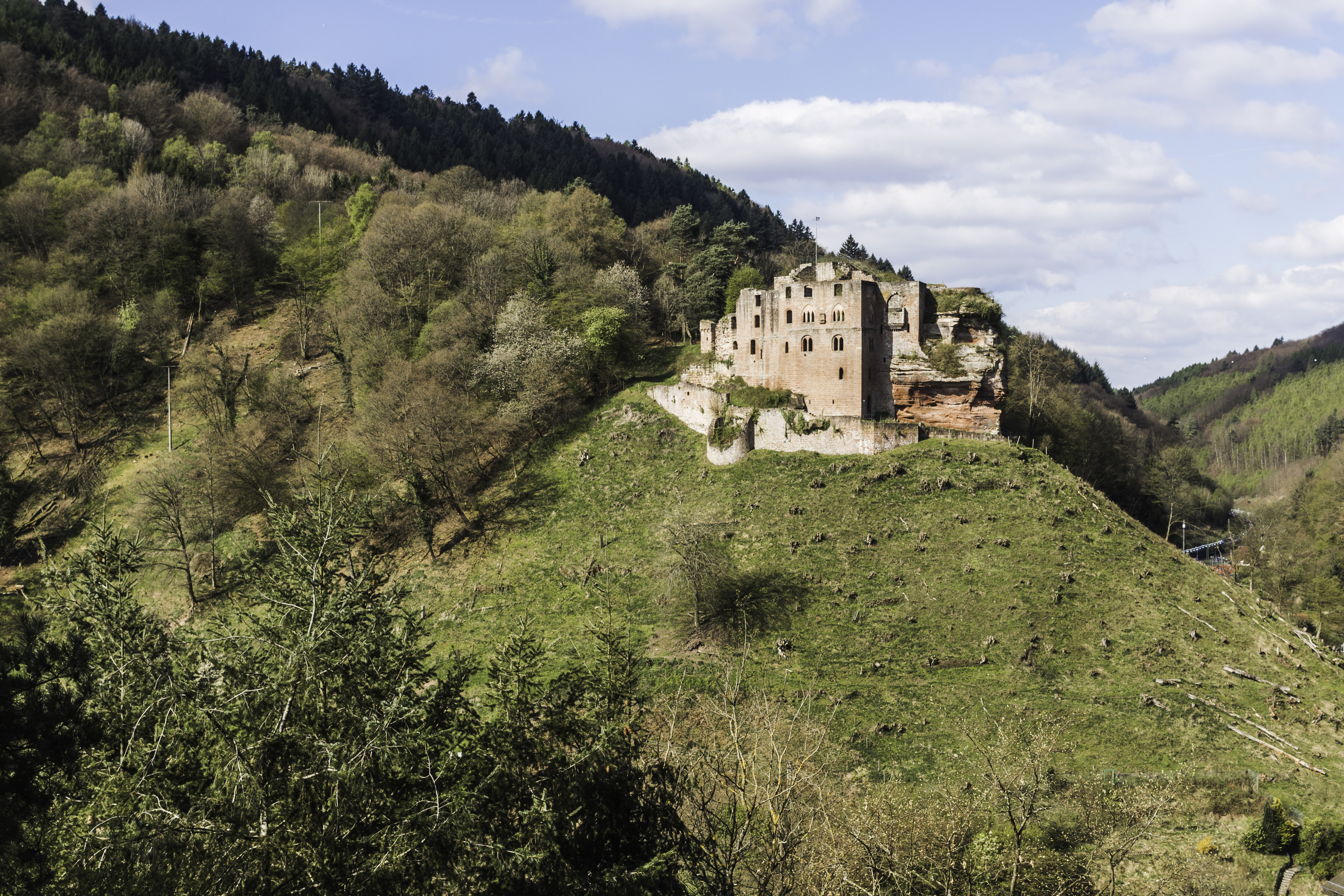

Site information
- Type: Medieval fortification
- Owner: Rhineland-Palatinate

Location
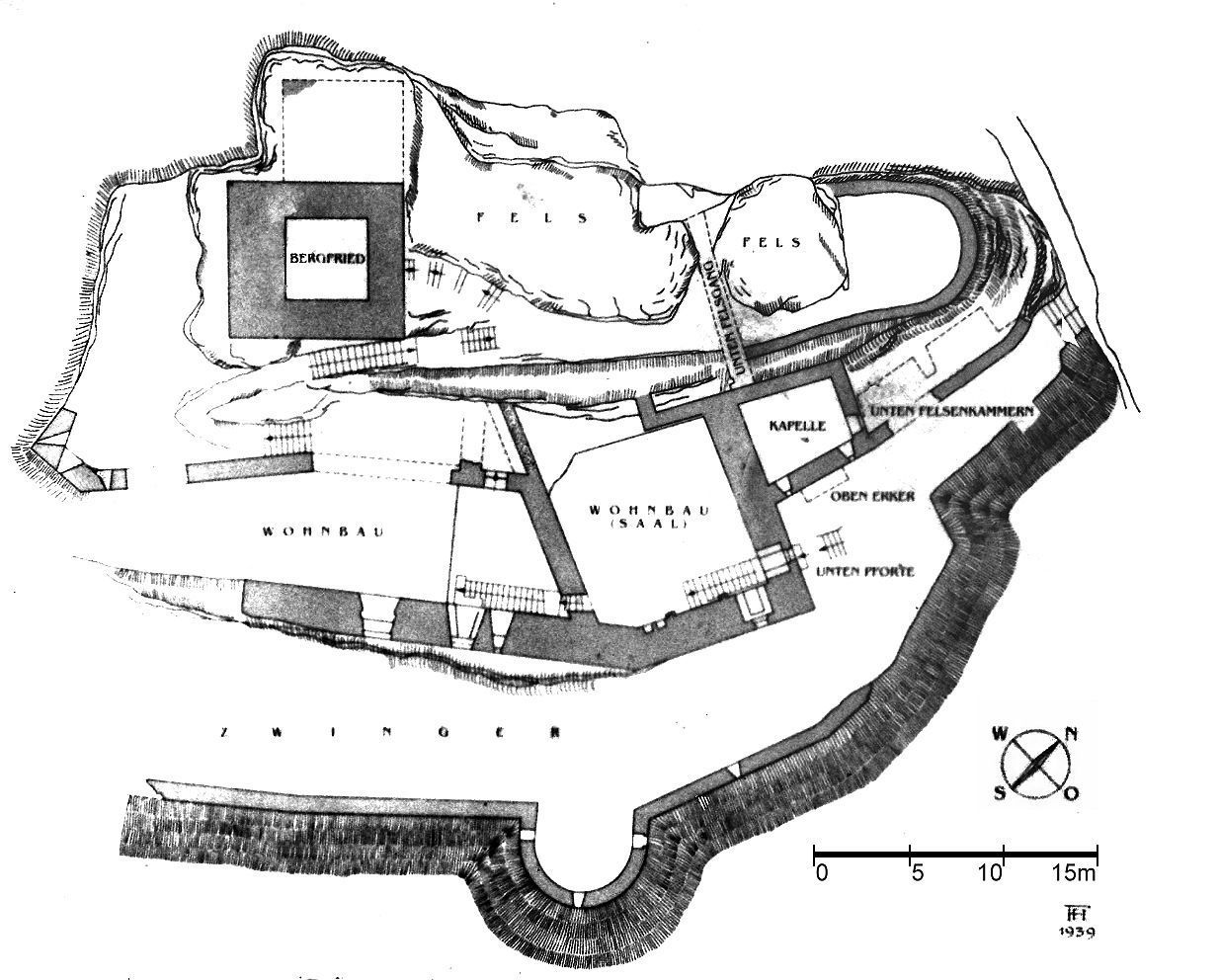

Site history
- Built: 1100

Frankenstein Castle is a medieval fortification on a spur above the village of Frankenstein, Rhineland-Palatinate in the Palatinate Forest in Germany. Its name derives from the local House of Frankenstein.

== History ==
The name first appeared in a document of 1146 mentioning the free nobleman (Edelfrei) Helenger of Frankenstein. But the beginning of the castle is assumed to be at an earlier date because the erection of a defensive tower around 1100 is reported in various documents.

The tower belonged to nearby Limburg Abbey in charge of security on the road to Speyer, Dürkheim and Worms. In 1205, the monastery commissioned the counts of Leiningen with this task. The counts had the tower expanded to a castle in the beginning of the 13th. century.

From 1204 to 1231, documents mention the knights Marquard, Friedrich and Helenger von Frankenstein as administrators in charge of the castle. Around 1390 Frankenstein Castle became a joint heritage castle when Limburg Abbey pledged half of the castle to the Lords of Einselthum. A part of this pledge was taken over by the counts of Nassau -Saarbrücken and Leiningen-Hardenburg in the beginning of the 15th. century.

In the second half of the 15th. century the castle was damaged in the struggles between Prince-elector Frederick I and Count Palatine Ludwig I of Zweibrücken. The castle suffered further damage, presumably in 1512, when the Count of Nassau conquered it on orders of emperor Maximilian I. During the German Peasants' War the castle was destroyed and was considered uninhabitable as of 1560. Nevertheless, it served military purposes because of its strategic position.

In the Thirty Years' War the Spanish General Ambrosio Spinola captured the castle. In the War of the Spanish Succession it was used to accommodate French troops. It is confirmed that these troops still used the castle chapel for mass in 1703.

In 1706, the Electoral Palatinate took possession of the Nassau-Saarbrücken share of the castle.

After the Palatinate had become part of Bavaria, the ruins of the castle were secured in 1883–84. Another upgrading took place in 1938–39.

Today the castle is owned by the state of Rhineland-Palatinate. In the 1970s and 1980s some parts of the castle were restored and foundations of a previously unknown shield wall were unearthed.
