= Welschbillig =

- Municipality
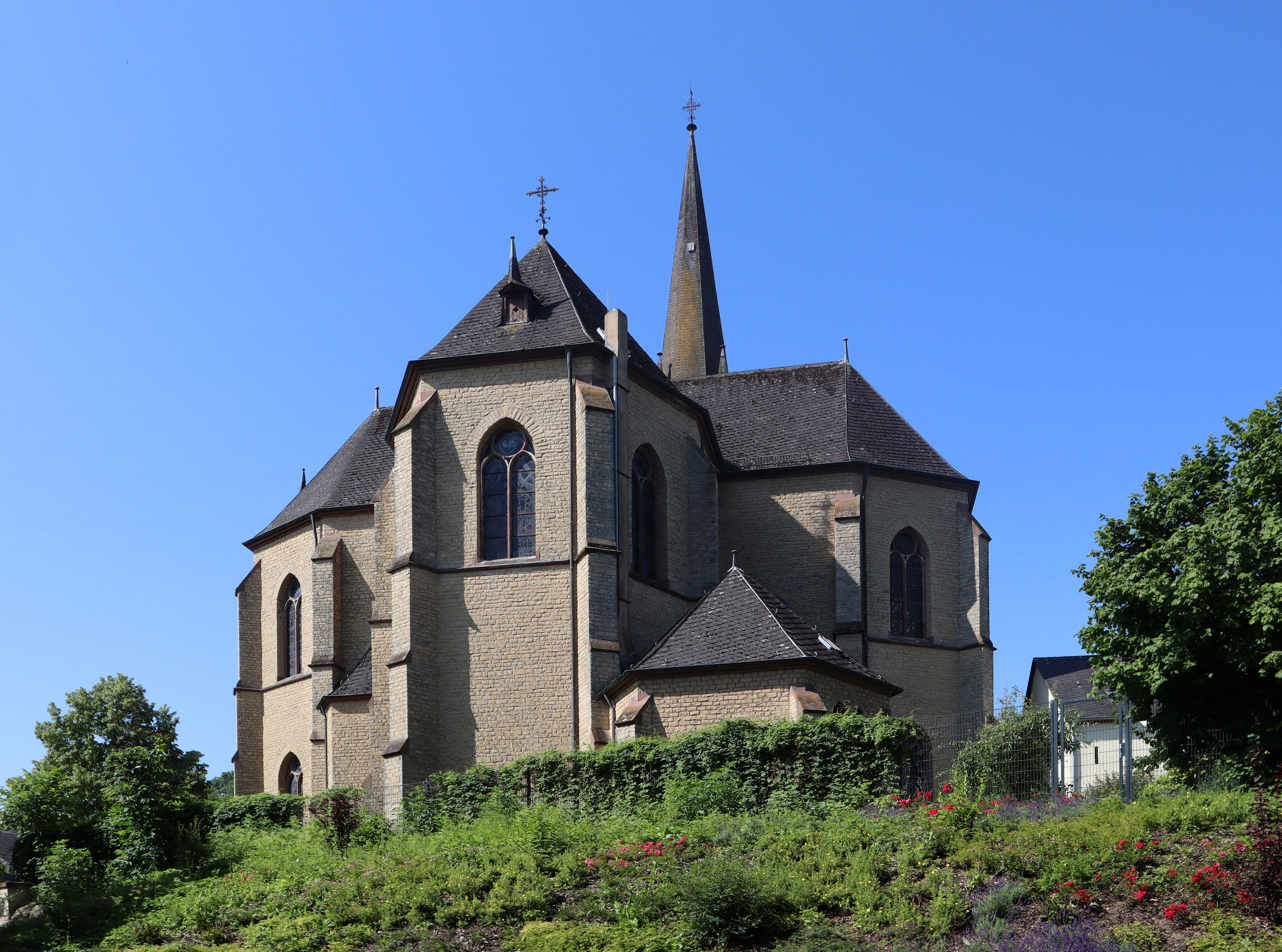

- Coat of arms

- Location of Welschbillig within Trier-Saarburg district
- Interactive map of Welschbillig
- Location within Germany Location within Rhineland-Palatinate
- Coordinates: 49°51′21″N 6°34′03″E
- Country: Germany
- State: Rhineland-Palatinate
- District: Trier-Saarburg
- Municipal assoc.: Trier-Land
- Subdivisions: 5 Ortsteile

Government
  - Mayor (2019–24): Dieter Bretz (FW)

Area
  - Total: 37.08 km^{2} (14.32 sq mi)
- Elevation: 290 m (950 ft)

Population (2025-12-31)
  - Total: 2,525
  - Density: 68.10/km^{2} (176.4/sq mi)
- Time zone: UTC+01:00 (CET)
  - Summer (DST): UTC+02:00 (CEST)
- Postal codes: 54298
- Dialling codes: 06506
- Vehicle registration: TR
- Website: www.welschbillig.de

Welschbillig is a municipality in the Trier-Saarburg district, in Rhineland-Palatinate, Germany.
