= Schönau, Rhineland-Palatinate =

Schönau
- Municipality
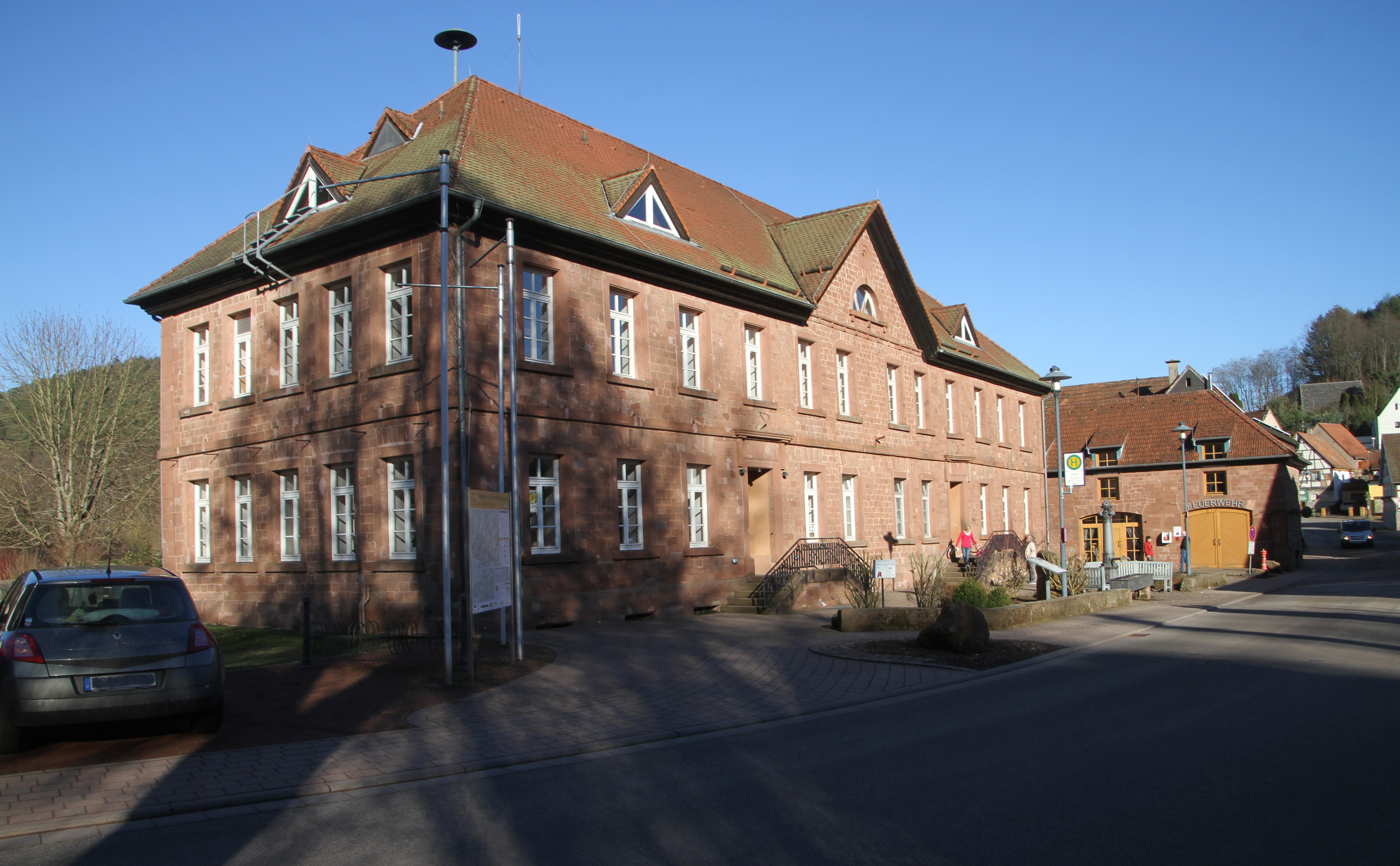

- Coat of arms

- Location of Schönau within Südwestpfalz district
- Interactive map of Schönau
- Location within Germany Location within Rhineland-Palatinate
- Coordinates: 49°3′37.97″N 7°44′52.45″E
- Country: Germany
- State: Rhineland-Palatinate
- District: Südwestpfalz
- Municipal assoc.: Dahner Felsenland

Government
  - Mayor (2019–24): Rudolf van Venrooy

Area
  - Total: 16.35 km^{2} (6.31 sq mi)
- Elevation: 295 m (968 ft)

Population (2025-12-31)
  - Total: 381
  - Density: 23.3/km^{2} (60.4/sq mi)
- Time zone: UTC+01:00 (CET)
  - Summer (DST): UTC+02:00 (CEST)
- Postal codes: 66996
- Dialling codes: 06393
- Vehicle registration: PS
- Website: www.schoenau-pfalz.de

Schönau (German pronunciation: [ˈʃøːnaʊ]) is a village in the Südwestpfalz district, in Rhineland-Palatinate, western Germany on the French border. It has a population of roughly 400.

A former monastic yard grew into the village near the end of the Middle Ages, due to the establishment of an iron ore smelting plant by the Dukes of the Palatinate-Zweibrücken. The popularity of Wasgauer iron ore, which was smelted in Schoenau, reached its peak in the middle of the 19th century and lasted until 1883, when the facility was shut down.

The post office issued a special stamp to mark the occasion of Schönau's 850th anniversary in the year 1982.

Schönau was the seat of many social organizations over the years, the first one being "Gesellschaft für Verschönerung der Wegelnburg" formed around the year 1860.

Veterans of the Franco-Prussian War (1870–1871) formed "Kriegskameradschaft Schönau" in 1904.

In the same year also a local's group and an administration office of the “federation of Christian building craftsmen and assistant building laborer of Germany” developed in Schönau.

In 1912 came the establishment of the cyclist association "Waldeslust".

Between the First and Second World Wars, several church sponsored associations existed in Schönau . Kirchenchor (Pfarrcäcilienverein) young man's association, a trade association as well as the trombone choir Schönau/Hirschthal, and in 1928 the “German youth strength” (DJK) which consisted of a track-and-field events and a football department. All of these organizations were shut down during the Second World War.

In addition it is the nearest village to Wegelnburg Castle, which is the highest altitude castle ruin of the Palatinate Forest (572m).
