= Leinsweiler =

- Municipality
- Coat of arms

- Location of Leinsweiler within Südliche Weinstraße district
- Interactive map of Leinsweiler
- Location within Germany Location within Rhineland-Palatinate
- Coordinates: 49°11′03″N 8°01′14″E
- Country: Germany
- State: Rhineland-Palatinate
- District: Südliche Weinstraße
- Municipal assoc.: Landau-Land

Government
  - Mayor (2019–24): Thomas Stübinger

Area
  - Total: 5.80 km^{2} (2.24 sq mi)
- Elevation: 263 m (863 ft)

Population (2025-12-31)
  - Total: 512
  - Density: 88.3/km^{2} (229/sq mi)
- Time zone: UTC+01:00 (CET)
  - Summer (DST): UTC+02:00 (CEST)
- Postal codes: 76829
- Dialling codes: 06345
- Vehicle registration: SÜW
- Website: www.leinsweiler.de

Leinsweiler is a municipality in Südliche Weinstraße district, in Rhineland-Palatinate, western Germany. With other small villages, it forms the “Verbandsgemeinde” (‘collective municipality’) Landau-Land. (Named after the city of Landau).
