= Kamp-Bornhofen =

- Municipality
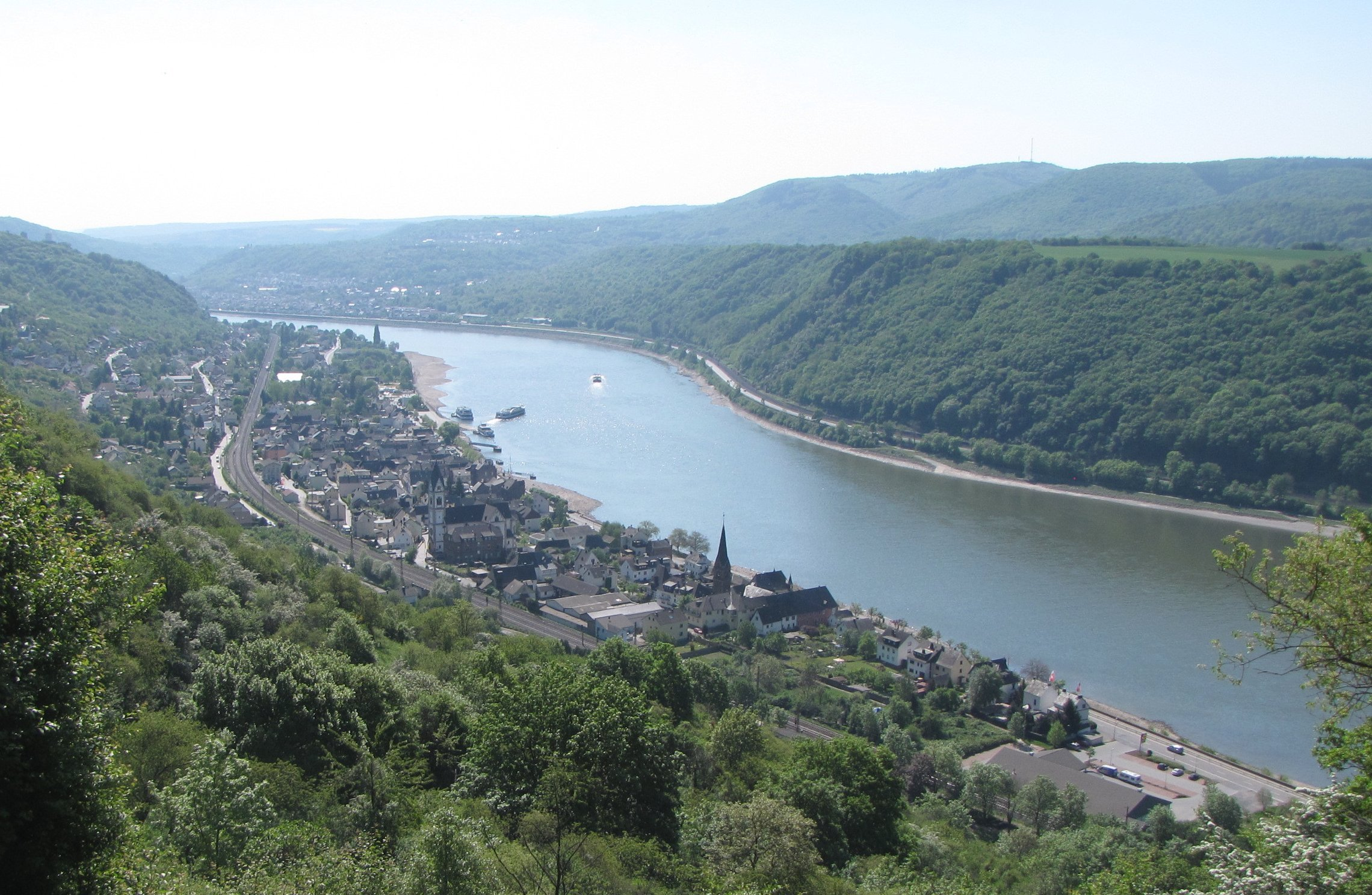
- View of Kamp-Bornhofen in the Rhine Gorge

- Coat of arms

- Location of Kamp-Bornhofen within Rhein-Lahn-Kreis district
- Interactive map of Kamp-Bornhofen
- Location within Germany Location within Rhineland-Palatinate
- Coordinates: 50°13′30″N 7°37′20″E
- Country: Germany
- State: Rhineland-Palatinate
- District: Rhein-Lahn-Kreis
- Municipal assoc.: Loreley

Government
  - Mayor (2019–24): Frank Kalkofen

Area
  - Total: 11.37 km^{2} (4.39 sq mi)
- Elevation: 69 m (226 ft)

Population (2025-12-31)
  - Total: 1,465
  - Density: 128.8/km^{2} (333.7/sq mi)
- Time zone: UTC+01:00 (CET)
  - Summer (DST): UTC+02:00 (CEST)
- Postal codes: 56341
- Dialling codes: 06773
- Vehicle registration: EMS, DIZ, GOH
- Website: www.kamp-bornhofen.de

Kamp-Bornhofen is a municipality in the district of Rhein-Lahn, in Rhineland-Palatinate, in western Germany. Sights in Kamp-Bornhofen include the well known castle Liebenstein.

It has been twinned with the town of Raunds, Northamptonshire, UK since 31 August 1991

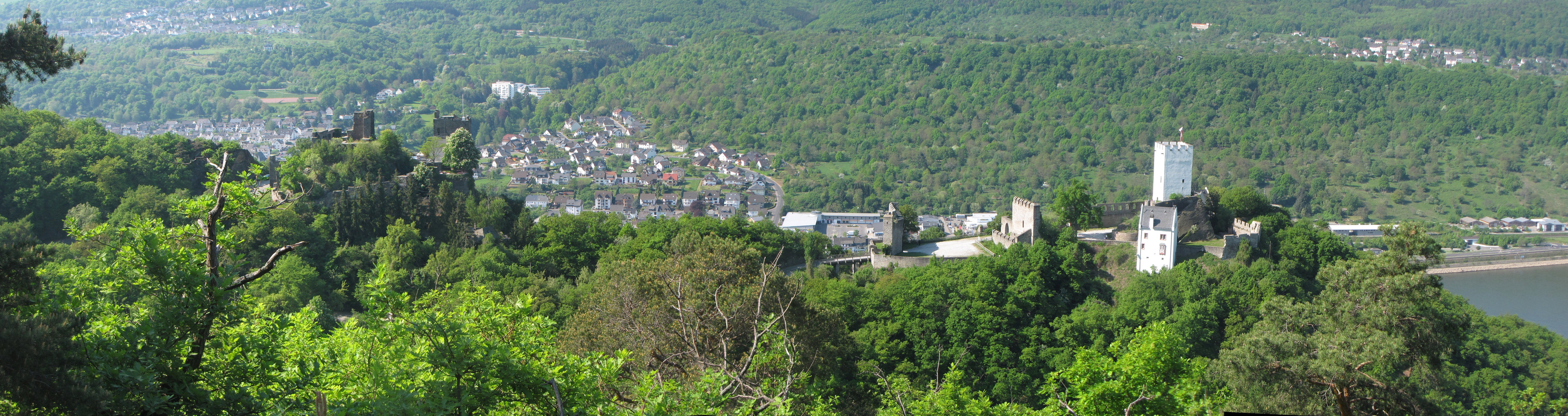
Burg Liebenstein and Burg Sterrenberg, known as the Feindliche Brüder ("Adversarial Brothers") after a German legend that arose in the 16th century
