= Liebenstein Castle (Rhine) =

- Burg Liebenstein
- Kamp-Bornhofen
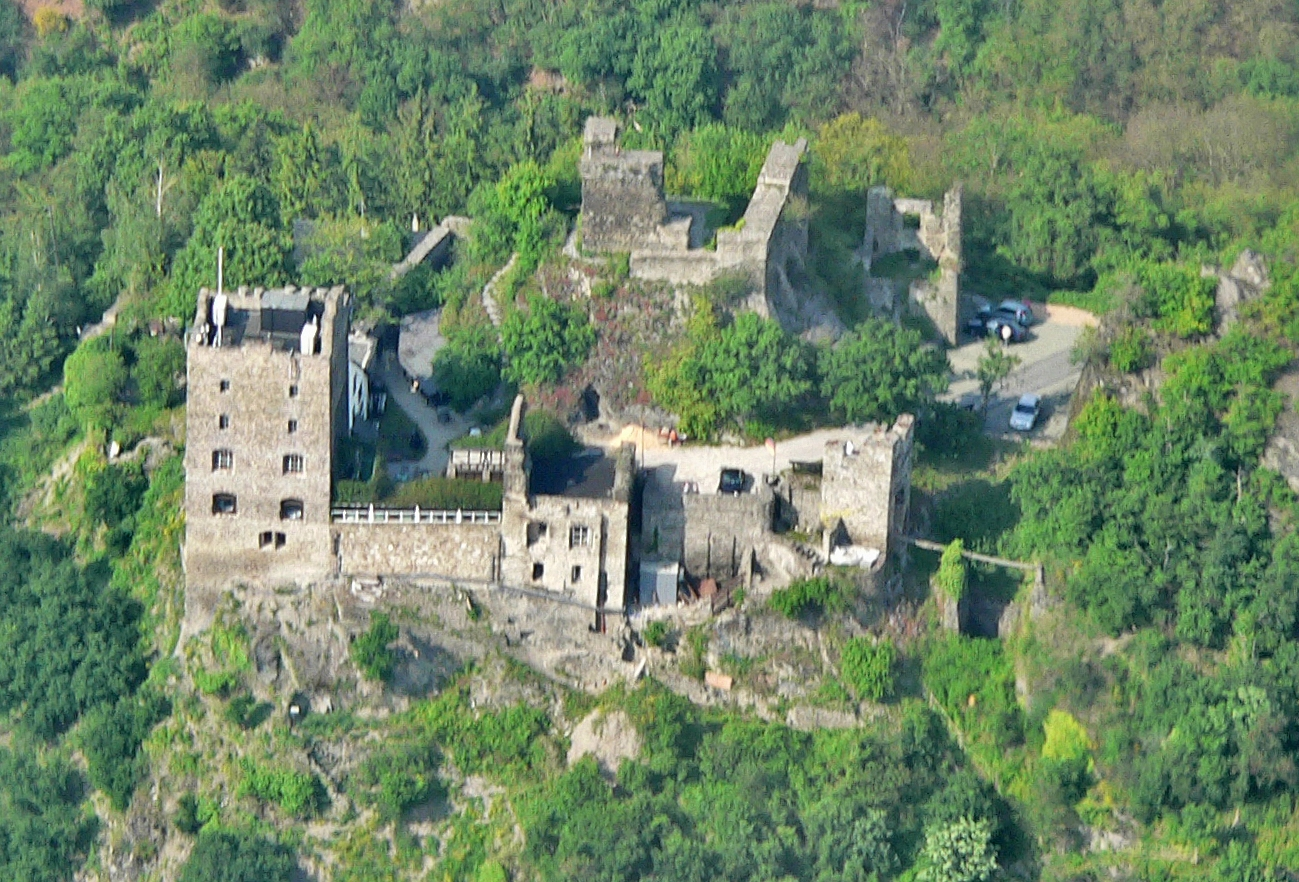

Site information
- Type: Medieval castle

Location
- Coordinates: 50°12′45″N 7°38′08″E

Site history
- Built: 1284

Liebenstein Castle (German: Burg Liebenstein) is a castle above the village of Kamp-Bornhofen in Rhineland-Palatinate, Germany.

== Sources and external links ==
- Official website
- 3d-view of the castle at Sketchfab and Altizure
