= Holpertal =

Valley in the Palatine Forest of Germany

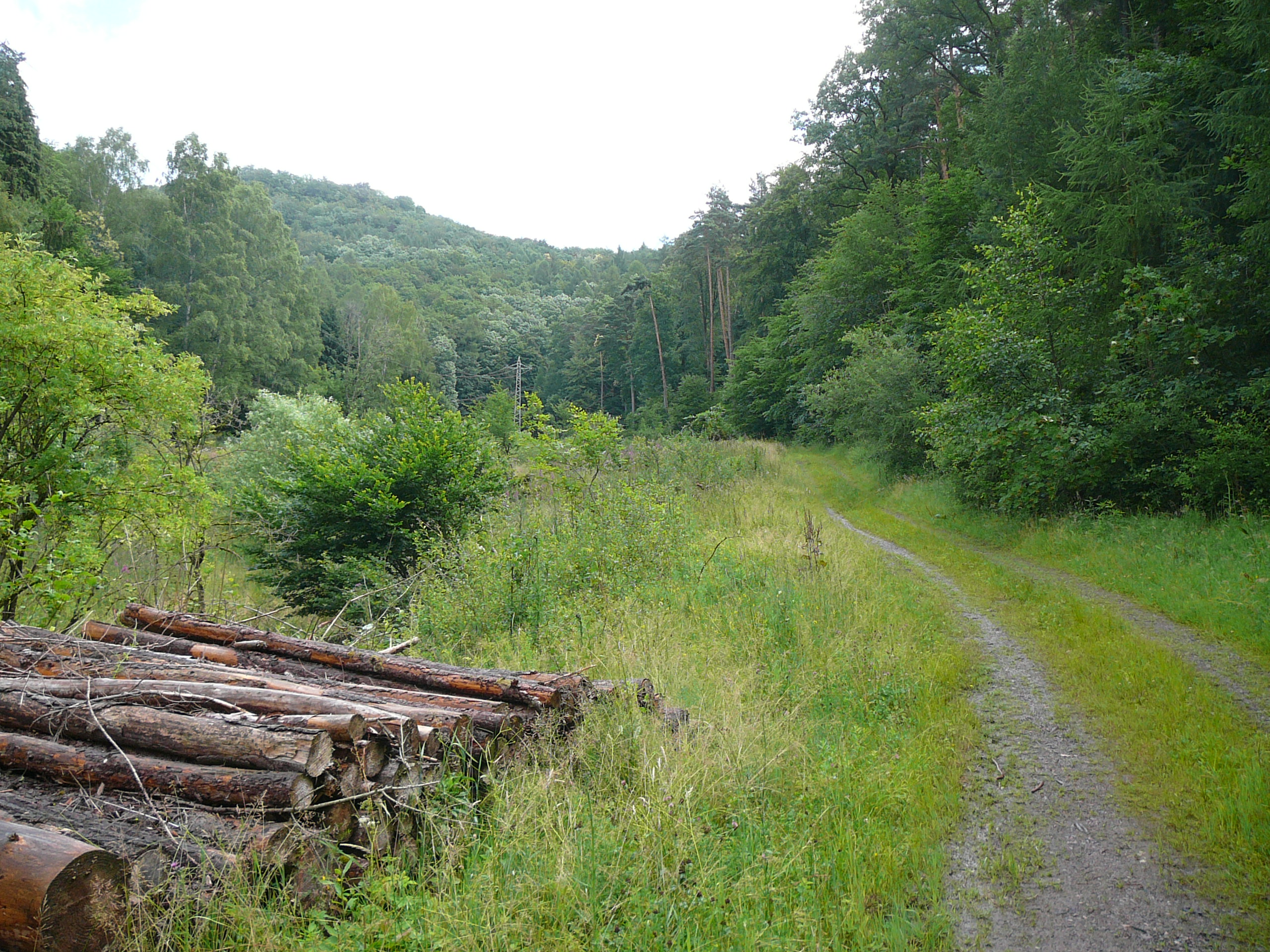
- The Upper Holpertal: view looking northeast to the Burgberg (rear left) the ruins of Meistersel and the pass of Drei Buchen
- Floor elevation: 250-400 metres
- Length: 1.5 km (0.93 mi)

Geology
- Type: V-shaped valley
- Age: Bunter, Zechstein

Geography
- Location: Rhineland-Palatinate, Germany
- Coordinates: 49.270802°N 8.014845°E
- Mountain range: Palatinate Forest (Haardt mountains)
- Rivers: Holperbach
- Interactive map of Holpertal

The Holpertal is a valley, just one and a half kilometres long, in the central Palatine Forest of Germany. It lies within the municipality of Ramberg in the county of Südliche Weinstraße in the state of Rhineland-Palatinate. Its V-shaped cross-section was cut by the waters of the Holperbach stream, which has incised deeply into the rock layers of the Lower Bunter. The valley floor climbs from an elevation of about 250 metres to well over 400 metres. Its slopes are covered with mixed forest and sweet chestnut. Whilst at one time, the valley produced raw materials for the traditional broom and brush-making industries, today forestry and tourism predominate.

In the immediate vicinity of the Holpertal are a number of points of interest that include the castle ruins of Meistersel, Ramburg and Neuscharfeneck Castle, the Brushmakers' Museum in Ramberg and a number of hiking destinations.

== Geography ==
=== Location ===
The Holpertal lies in the eastern part of the Palatine Forest a few kilometres from the edge of the Haardt and, together with the Nonnental, forms the northern head of the Ramberg valley.

== Literature ==
- Deutscher Wetterdienst, ed. (1957), Klima-Atlas von Rheinland-Pfalz (in German), Bad Kissingen: Verlag Deutscher Wetterdienst, ISBN 3881481354
- Landesamt für Vermessung und Geobasisinformation Rheinland-Pfalz, ed. (1999), Topographische Karte 1:25.000 Annweiler am Trifels (in German) (4. ed.), Koblenz: Verlag Landesamt für Vermessung und Geobasisinformation Rheinland-Pfalz, ISBN 3896372882
- Michael Geiger u. a., ed. (1987), Der Pfälzerwald, Porträt einer Landschaft (in German), Landau (Pfalz): Verlag Pfälzische Landeskunde, ISBN 3980114716
- Michael Geiger u. a., ed. (2010), Geographie der Pfalz (in German), Landau (Pfalz): Verlag Pfälzische Landeskunde, ISBN 9783981297409
