= Ramburg =

- Ramberg
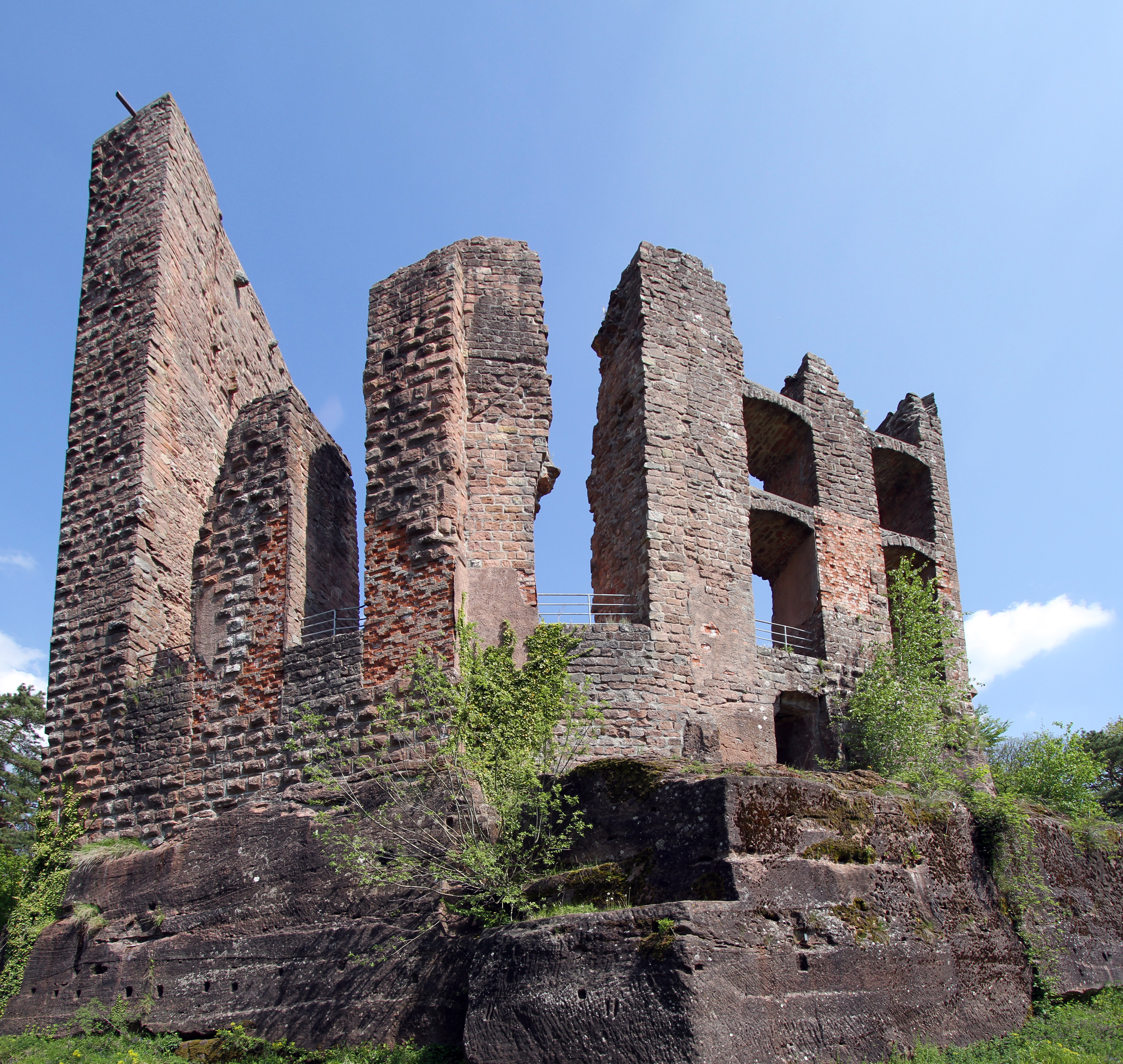
- Ramburg castle

Site information
- Type: hill castle
- Code: DE-RP
- Condition: curtain walls

Location
- Coordinates: 49°15′59″N 8°00′22″E
- Height: 444 m above sea level (NN)

Site history
- Built: 1100 to 1200 A.D.

Garrison information
- Occupants: nobility, ministeriales, counts

The Ramburg is a ruined hill castle in the county of Südliche Weinstraße, in the German state of Rhineland-Palatinate.

== Geography ==
The ruins of the Ramburg stand on the Schlossberg ("castle hill") at a height of 444 m above sea level (NN) above the village of Ramberg in the Palatinate region. The river Dernbach, the left-hand headstream of the Eisbach) flows through the valley.

Other castle ruins in the vicinity are: Modeneck Castle (ca. 2 km east-northeast), Frankenfelsen Castle (ca. 2.5 km east-northeast) and Neuscharfeneck Castle (ca. 2 km southeast).

== History ==
The Ramburg was built in the 12th century under the House of Hohenstaufen as an imperial castle for the protection of Trifels Castle. It is recorded as the seat of imperial ministeriales from 1163.

In 1519, Hans of Ramburg, the last member of the House of Ramburg, sold his castle to the Dalbergs. Six years later the castle was completely razed during the Peasants' War.

In 1540 the ruins were sold to the counts of Löwenstein. After being totally destroyed by a lightning strike in 1560 it was rebuilt as a residential castle again.

The castle was plundered during the Thirty Years' War, but not destroyed. Until 1638 it remained occupied as district office (Amtsitz), but fell into increasing disrepair and was used as a quarry in the early 18th century.

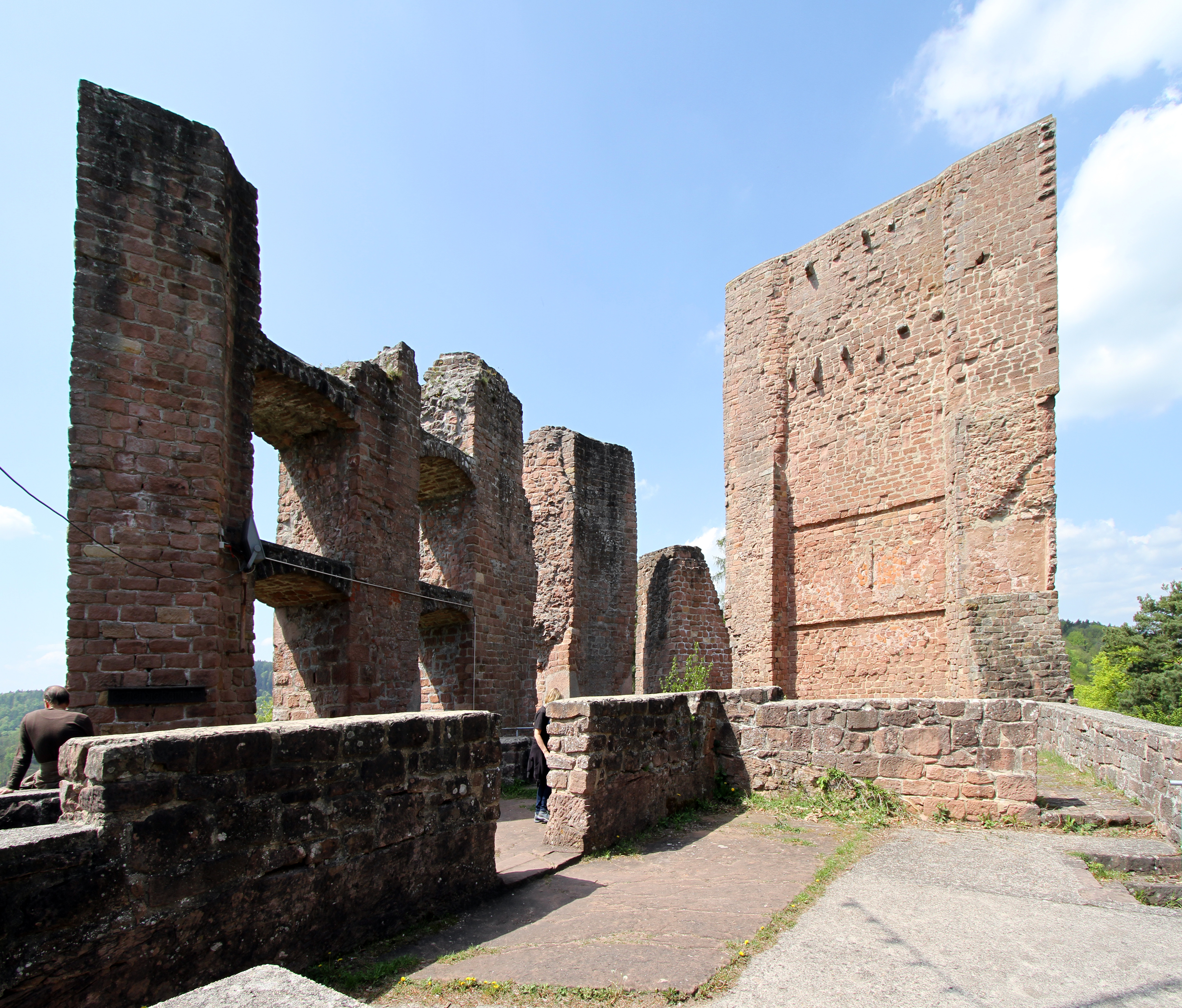
Palas and shield wall

== Description ==
From the valley the impressive remains of the mighty shield wall and the palas are still visible. In addition, a neck ditch, several wall remains and a huge rock cellar have survived.

== Literature ==
- Rolf Übel: Ramburg, Meistersel, Frankenburg, bei Ramburg Kreis Südliche Weinstraße. Verlag für Burgenkunde und Pfalzforschung, Landau, 1999, ISBN 3-929893-07-X (= Burgen der Südpfalz, Vol. 3)
- Alexander Thon (ed.): „... wie eine gebannte, unnahbare Zauberburg“. Burgen in der Südpfalz, 2nd revised edition, Regensburg, 2005, pp. 128–131. ISBN 3795415705
