= Drei Buchen =

Hill pass in Rhineland-Palatinate, Germany

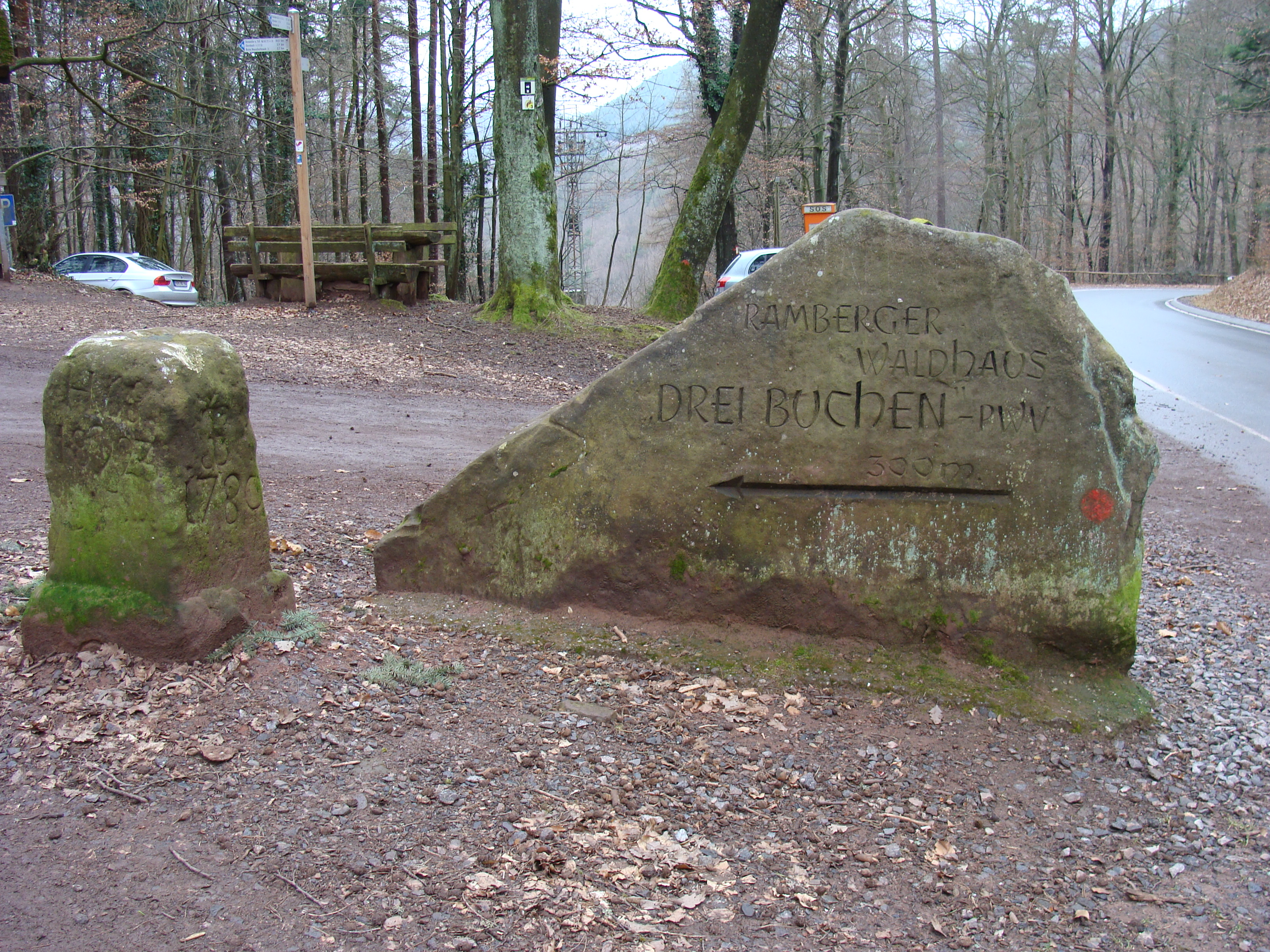
- Ritterstein No. 234: Drei Buchen
- Interactive map of Drei Buchen
- Elevation: 403 m (1,322 ft)^{DE-NHN}
- Traversed by: Passstraße

Third Approach
- Range: Palatine Forest
- Coordinates: 49°16′15″N 8°01′26″E

Drei Buchen is a hill pass in the central Palatine Forest in the German state of Rhineland-Palatinate. It lies in the estate of the village of Ramberg at a height of 403 metres above sea level (NHN). The L 506 state road runs over the pass from Ramberg to Weyher. At the top of the pass is an inn, the Waldhaus Drei Buchen. The name Drei Buchen means "Three Beeches".

== Geography ==
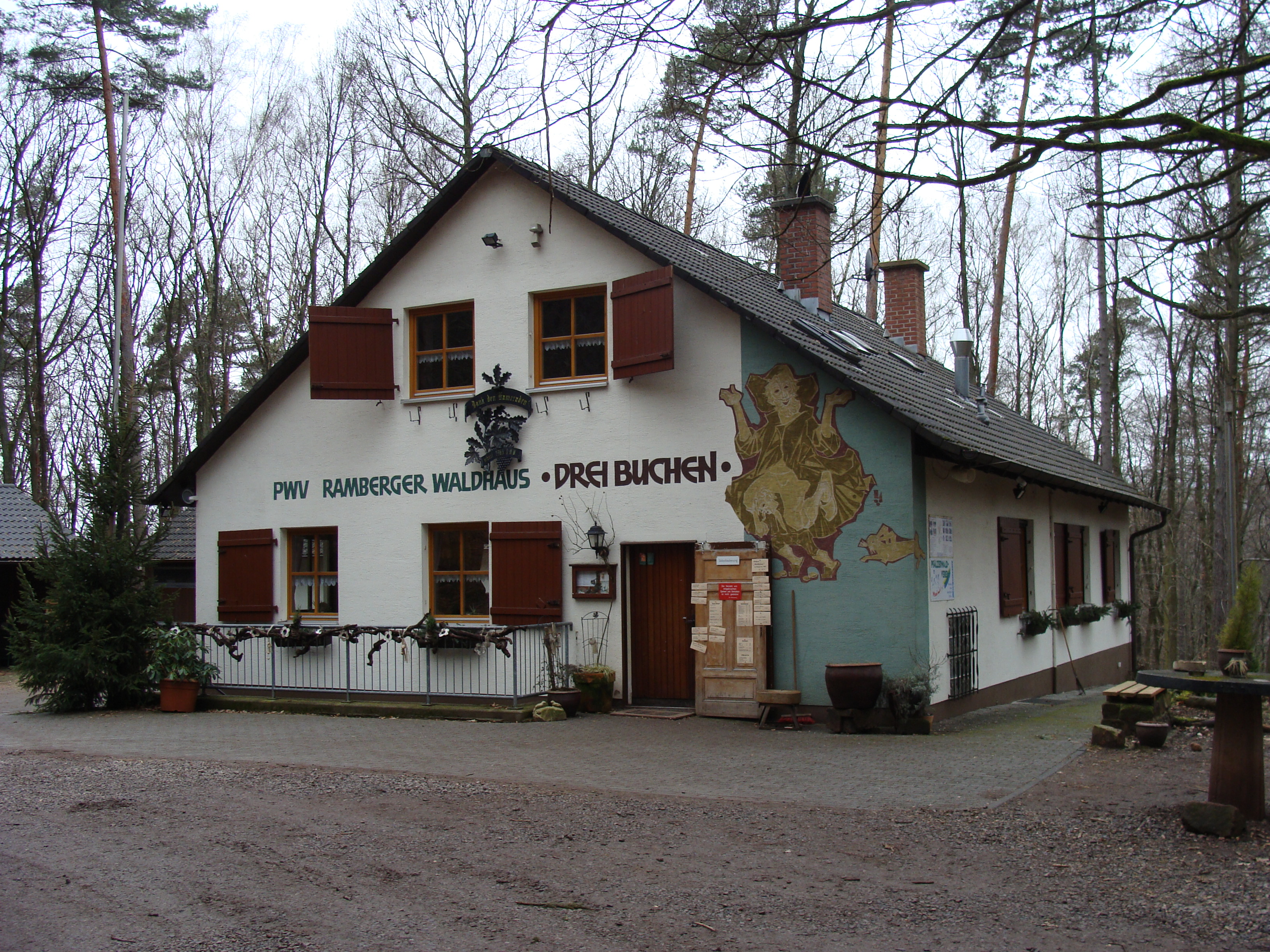
Ramberg's Waldhaus Drei Buchen

The pass enables a crossing from the Ramberg valley, through which the Dernbach stream flows, to the valley of the Modenbach. Thus Drei Buchen is part of the watershed between the catchment areas of two left-hand tributaries of the River Rhine: the Queich and the Speyerbach. The highest hill in the vicinity of Drei Buchen is the 637-metre-high Roßberg, one kilometre to the southeast, which is the third highest peak in the Palatine Forest mountain range.

The road over the pass runs from Ramberg, two kilometres to the west, to Weyher, ten kilometres to the east.

At the top of the pass is the Ramberg forest inn or Waldhaus of Drei Buchen, which is managed by the Ramberg branch of the Palatine Forest Club, and a forest car park. The Ramberg Waldhaus should not be confused with the Waldhaus Drei Buchen east of the Bichtenberg in the county of Südwestpfalz, which is 24 kilometres to the southwest. The Ritterstein there, no. 213, also bears the inscription "Drei Buchen".

== Sights ==
At the top of the pass is a Ritterstein, number 234. Several medieval castles in the surrounding area have survived as ruins. The nearest is Meistersel Castle, also called Modeneck Castle (Burg Modeneck) or Modenbacher Schloss, just under one kilometre north. Within two kilometres are the ruins of Neuscharfeneck Castle and the Ramburg.
