= Dernbach (Eisbach) =

River in Germany

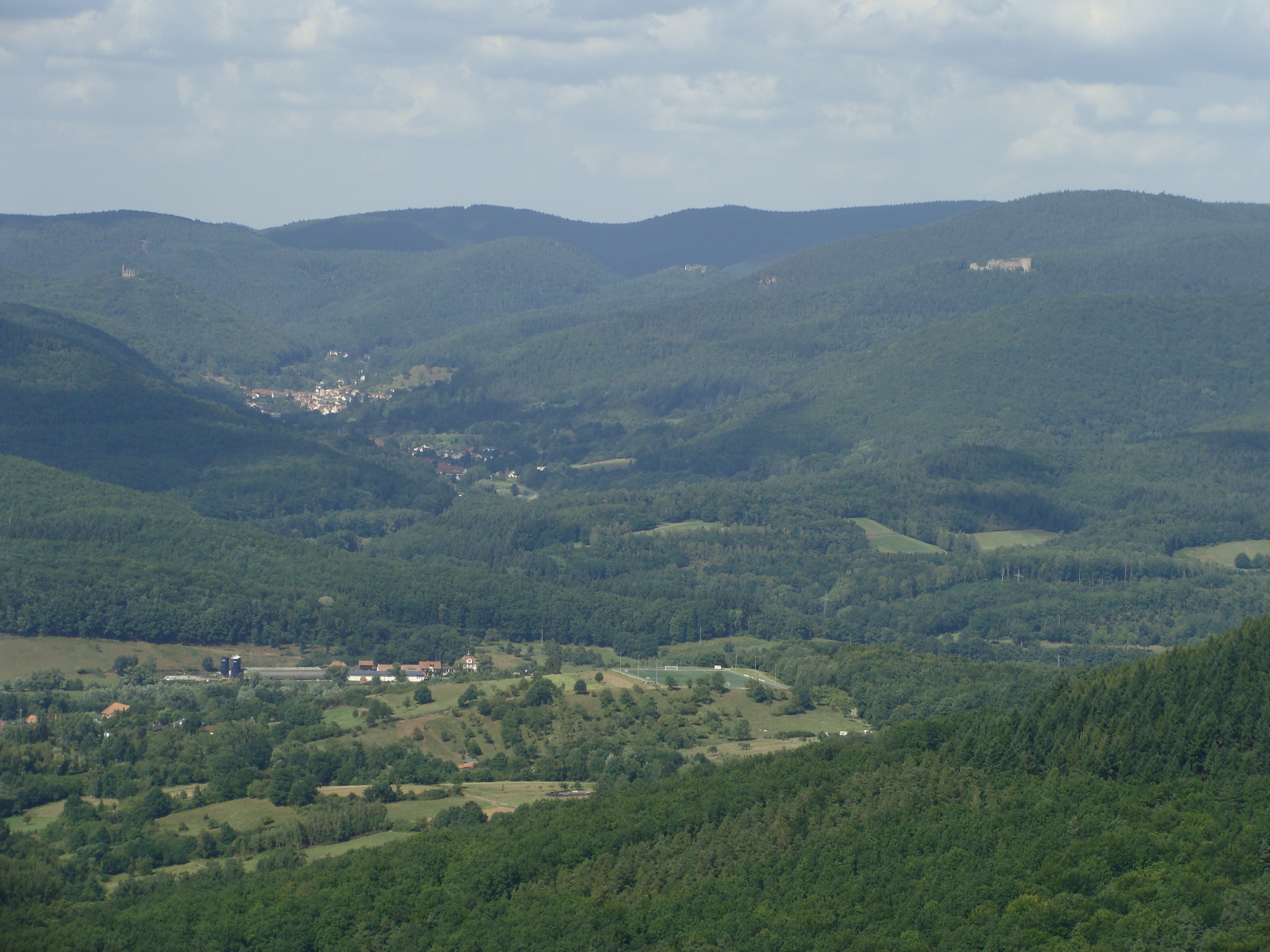
- The Dernbach valley

Location
- Country: Germany
- State: Rhineland-Palatinate
- Reference no.: DE: 2377268

Physical characteristics
- Source
  - location: Near Ramberg
  - coordinates: 49°17′00″N 7°59′29″E
  - elevation: ca. 364 m above sea level (NN)
- Mouth
  - location: Confluence: with the Eußerbach into the Eisbach
  - coordinates: 49°13′48″N 7°59′53″E
  - elevation: ca. 174 m above sea level (NN)
- Length: 7.46 km
- Basin size: 14.813 km²

Basin features
- Progression: Eisbach→ Queich→ Rhine→ North Sea
- Landmarks: Small towns: Annweiler am Trifels; Villages: Ramberg, Dernbach
- Tributaries
  - left: Waltersbach, Ohlsbach, Leinbach

The Dernbach (German pronunciation: [ˈdɛʁnbax]) is a river in the district of Südliche Weinstraße in the German state of Rhineland-Palatinate. It is 7.46 kilometres long and forms the left-hand, northern headstream of the Eisbach.

== Course ==
The southern part of the Dernbach runs through the central Palatine Forest. Its source is located on the eastern slopes of the Langentalkopf, the summit of which is 526 m above sea level. From its origin, the Dernbach flows in a mainly southerly direction and picks up the waters of several other small streams as well as the Waltersbach, which is just several hundred metres long and joins it from the north, before reaching the village of Ramberg. In the village itself the Ohlsbach empties into it from the east. Next, the Dernbach flows through its eponymous village where, at the northern edge of the settlement, it is joined by the Leinbach coming from the east.

Below the Vogelstockerhof farm, in the parish of Annweiler am Trifels, the Dernbach merges with the Eußerbach, which arrives from the right coming from the northwest, to form the Eisbach, a feeder of the Rhine tributary, the Queich.

== Sights ==
In the forests around the Dernbach valley lie the ruins of three castles: Meistersel, Neuscharfeneck and Ramburg; and on the other side of the Modenbach valley are the ruins of a fourth: Frankenfelsen.

== See also ==
- List of rivers of Rhineland-Palatinate
