= Imperial castle =

Castles of the Holy Roman Empire's ruler

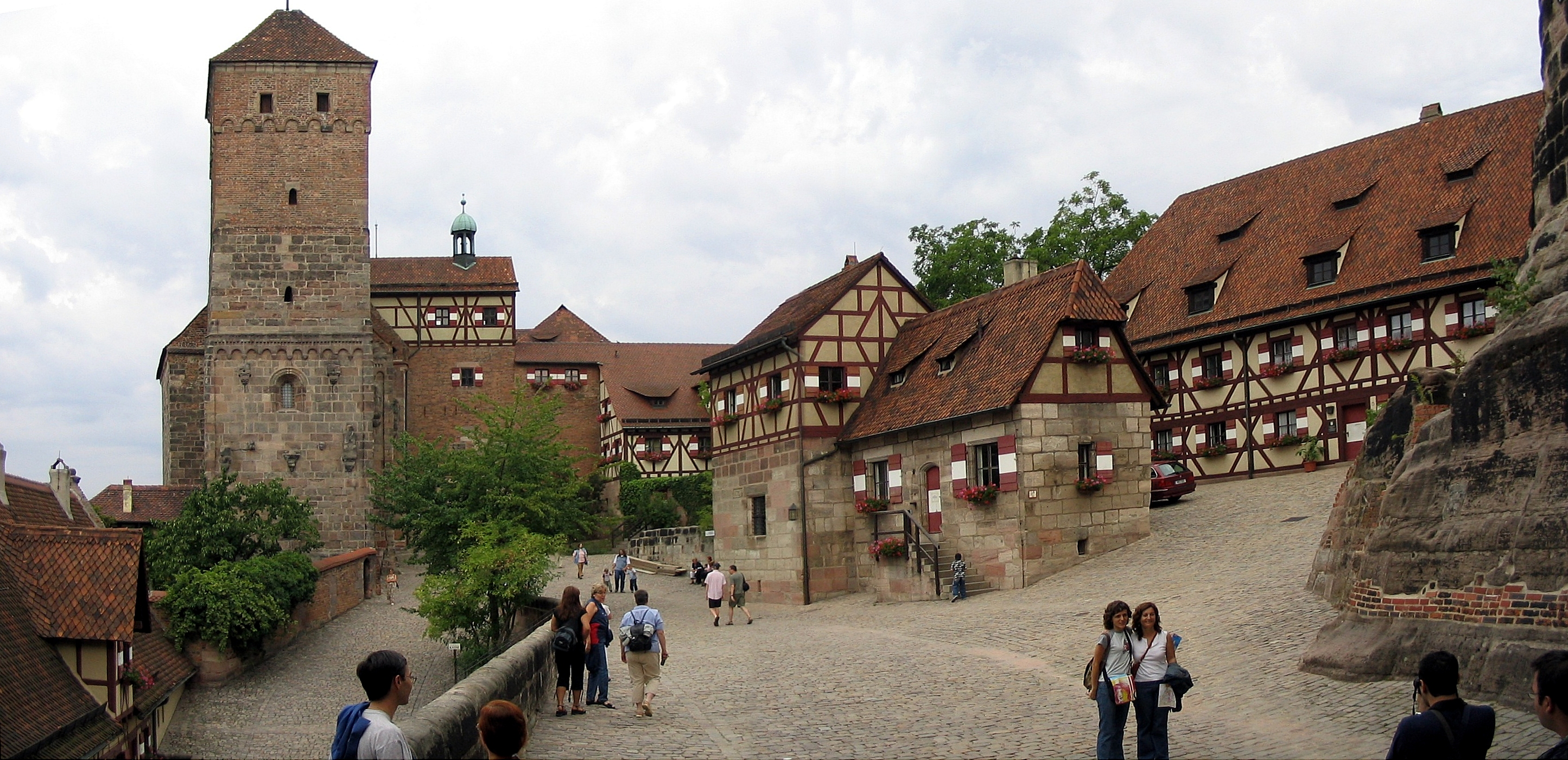
Courtyard of the imperial castle of Nuremberg, Bavaria, Germany

An imperial castle or Reichsburg was a castle built by order of (or acquired by) the King of the Romans or the Holy Roman Emperor on land that was owned by the crown (Reichsgut).

While in the early middle ages, in Francia, as well as in the early Holy Roman Empire, kings and emperors travelled around their realm with their itinerant courts, using their Kaiserpfalzen (imperial palaces) as transit stations and temporary residences, the weakly fortified pfalzen were replaced by imperial castles from the 13th century onwards. However, the stronger fortification of palaces had already begun in the Hohenstaufen period, as shown by the 3D reconstruction of the castle-like imperial pfalz of Haguenau designed by emperor Frederick Barbarossa in the middle of the 12th century.

After the fall of the Hohenstaufen dynasty, the royal power temporarily lapsed during the interregnum. One weak king after another was elected, but no one was able to exercise sovereign power. Princes and bishops tried to expand their territories. They oppressed less powerful nobles, fought the urban rulers (patricians and guilds), illegally seized imperial fiefdoms, introduced customs duties, new taxes and even royal regalia. Feuds, the law of the fist and robber barons escalated. In this situation, the barely fortified pfalzen no longer offered sufficient security to the German kings. Most were abandoned, repurposed by cities or local princes, disappeared under new development or fell into disrepair.

Instead of the pfalzen, the heavily fortified imperial castles were built, which - unlike the pfalzen, which were usually located in towns, lowlands, valleys or on river banks - were often hilltop castles like Nuremberg Castle or Trifels Castle. Many imperial castles were built in regions such as Swabia, Franconia, the Palatinate and the Alsace, where there were a high density of imperial estates (Reichsgüter) during the Hohenstaufen era. However, kings also liked to stay in free imperial cities loyal to them.

In France and England, from the 13th century onwards, stationary royal residences had begun to develop into capital cities that grew rapidly and developed corresponding infrastructure: the Palais de la Cité and the Palace of Westminster became the respective main residences. This was not possible in the Holy Roman Empire because no real hereditary monarchy emerged, but rather the tradition of elective monarchy prevailed (see: Imperial election) which, in the High Middle Ages, led to kings of very different regional origins being elected (List of royal and imperial elections in the Holy Roman Empire). However, if they wanted to control the empire and its rebellious regional rulers, they could not limit themselves to their home region and their private palaces. As a result, kings and emperors continued to travel around the empire well into modern times.

The management of the imperial castles, including its surrounding land with its dependants, was entrusted to ministerialis or Burgmannen who were called Reichsministerialen (imperial ministerialis) in this case.

== List of imperial castles (Reichsburgen) ==
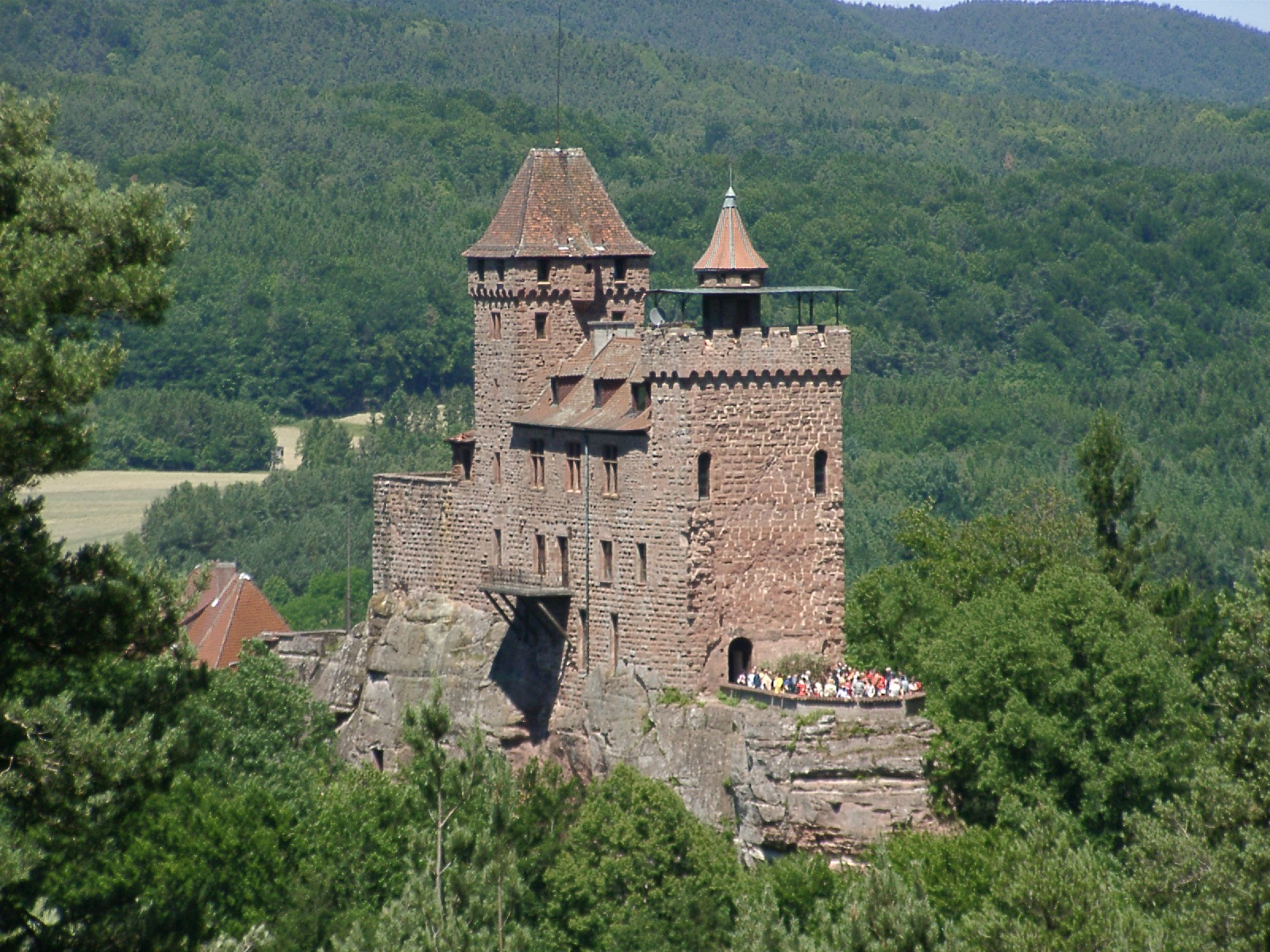
The imperial castle of Berwartstein, Palatinate, Germany

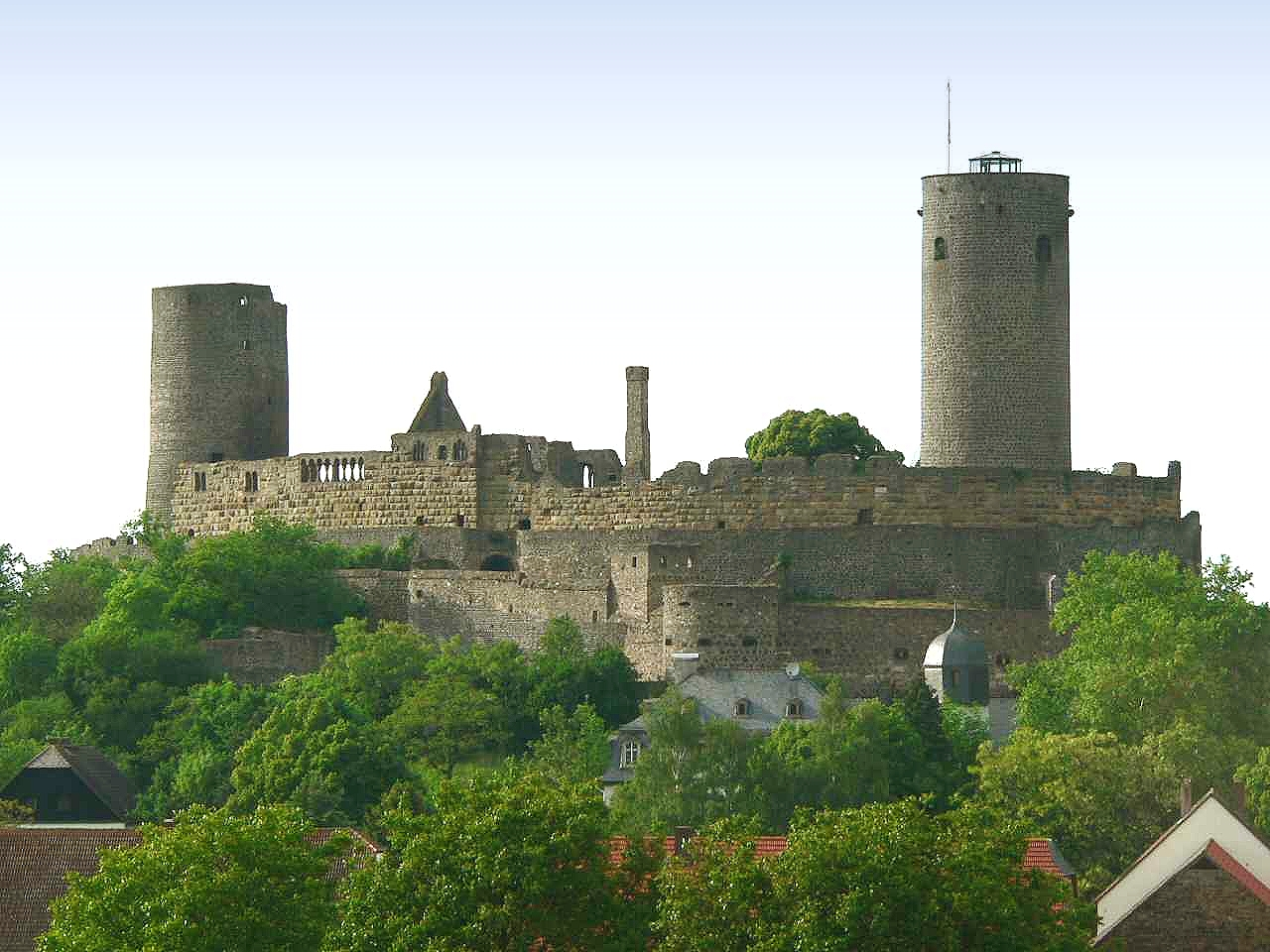
The imperial castle of Münzenberg, Hesse, Germany

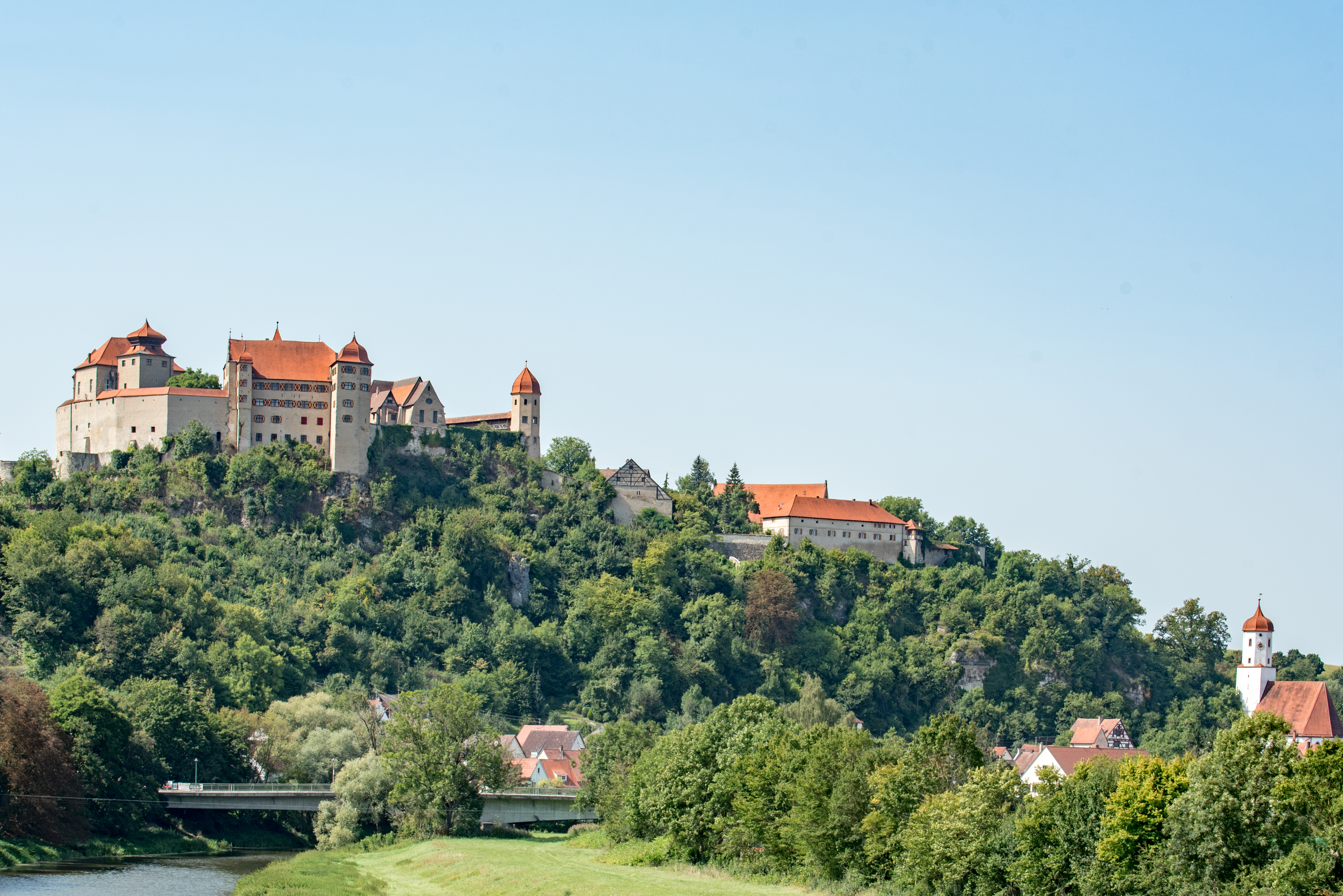
Harburg Castle, once a Staufian imperial castle, Harburg, Bavaria, Germany

=== France ===
- Château du Haut-Kœnigsbourg, Orschwiller, Alsace

=== Germany ===
==== Baden-Württemberg ====
- Grüningen Castle, Markgröningen
- Stettenfels Castle, Untergruppenbach

==== Bavaria ====
- Nuremberg Castle, Nuremberg
- Harburg Castle, Harburg
- Königsberg Castle, Königsberg, Bavaria
- Schwedenschanze Castle, Cham
- Lauf Castle, Lauf an der Pegnitz
- Wildenberg Castle, Kirchzell

==== Hesse ====
- Boyneburg, Sontra
- Friedberg Castle, Friedberg
- Gelnhausen Palace, Gelnhausen
- Hayn Castle, Dreieichenhain
- Kalsmunt Castle, Wetzlar
- Münzenberg Castle, Münzenberg

==== Lower Saxony ====
- Harliburg, Vienenburg

==== North Rhine-Westphalia ====
- Berenstein Castle, Bergstein

==== Rhineland-Palatinate ====
- Berwartstein Castle, Erlenbach bei Dahn
- Cochem Castle, Cochem
- Guttenberg Castle, Oberotterbach
- Hammerstein Castle, Hammerstein
- Landeck Castle, Landau
- Landskron Castle, Bad Neuenahr-Ahrweiler
- Lindelbrunn Castle, Vorderweidenthal
- Meistersel Castle, Ramberg
- Ramburg, Ramberg
- Trifels Castle, Annweiler
- Wegelnburg, Schönau
- Wildburg, Sargenroth
- Berenstein Castle

==== Saarland ====
- Kirkel Castle, Neuhäusel

==== Thuringia ====
- Kyffhausen Castle, Steinthaleben

=== Switzerland ===
- Gümmenen Castle, Gümmenen, canton of Bern
- Nydegg Castle, Bern, canton of Bern
- Weissenau Castle, Unterseen, canton of Bern

== See also ==
- The Imperial Castle in Poznań, Poland
- Palace
- Palas
- Kaiserpfalz (or Königspfalz)

== Sources ==
- Horst Wolfgang Böhme, Reinhard Friedrich, Barbara Schock-Werner (Hrsg.): Wörterbuch der Burgen, Schlösser und Festungen. Philipp Reclam, Stuttgart 2004, ISBN 3-15-010547-1, p. 208.
