= Ramberg, Rhineland-Palatinate =

Ramberg
- Municipality
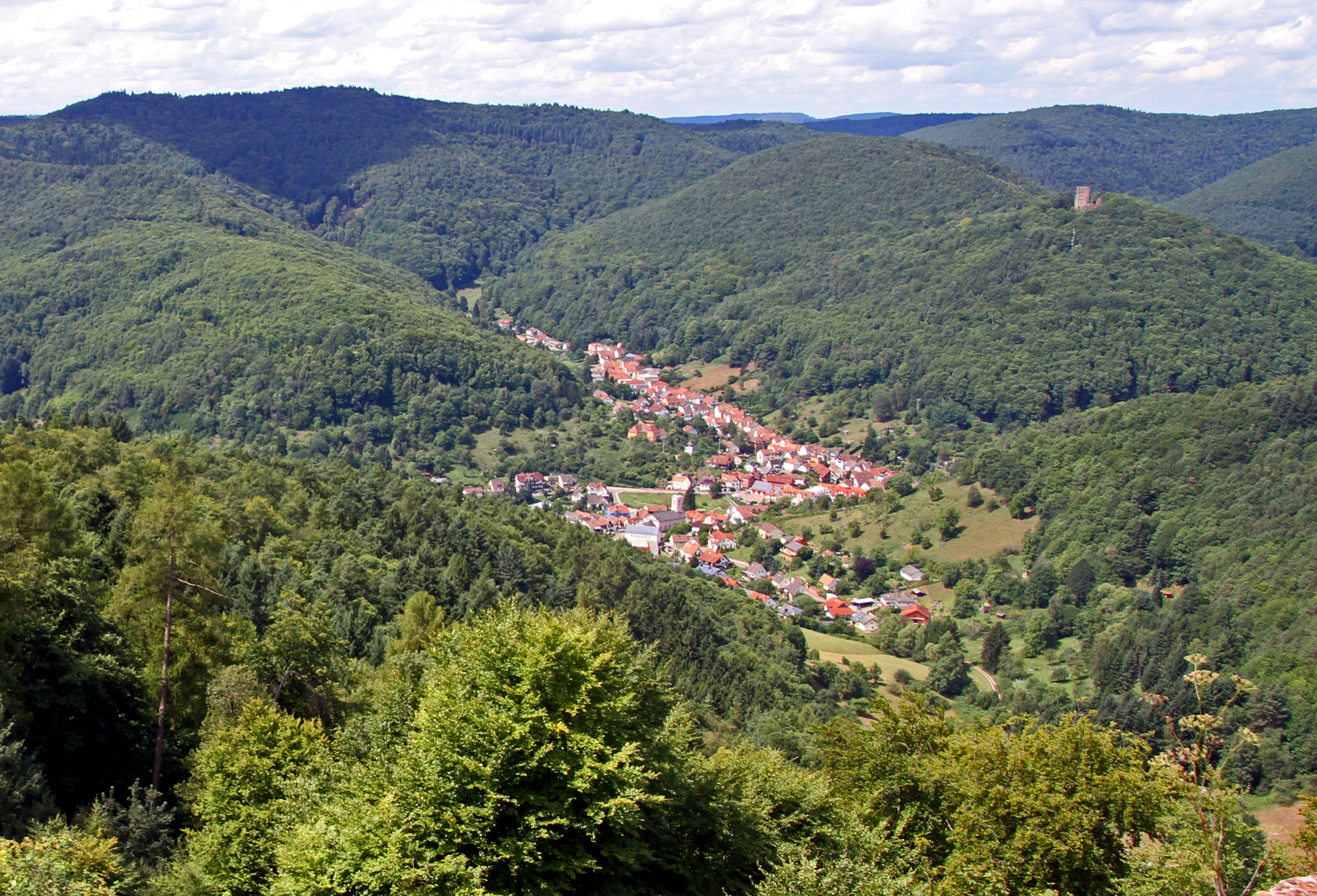

- Coat of arms

- Location of Ramberg within Südliche Weinstraße district
- Interactive map of Ramberg
- Location within Germany Location within Rhineland-Palatinate
- Coordinates: 49°15′44″N 8°00′34″E
- Country: Germany
- State: Rhineland-Palatinate
- District: Südliche Weinstraße
- Municipal assoc.: Annweiler am Trifels

Government
  - Mayor (2019–24): Jürgen Munz

Area
  - Total: 7.75 km^{2} (2.99 sq mi)
- Elevation: 237 m (778 ft)

Population (2025-12-31)
  - Total: 933
  - Density: 120/km^{2} (312/sq mi)
- Time zone: UTC+01:00 (CET)
  - Summer (DST): UTC+02:00 (CEST)
- Postal codes: 76857
- Dialling codes: 06345
- Vehicle registration: SÜW
- Website: www.ramberg.de

Ramberg (German pronunciation: [ˈʁambɛʁk]) is a municipality in Südliche Weinstraße district, in Rhineland-Palatinate, western Germany.

== Location ==
Ramberg lies in the Palatine Forest Nature Park around 7 km (as the crow flies) north-northeast of Annweiler am Trifels. The Dernbach stream, a tributary of the Eisbach, flows through the village from north to south direction and the village itself is surrounded by forested hills. A few hundred metres north of the built-up area is the valley of Holpertal.

On the Schlossberg ("castle hill"), which rises above the village, are the ruins of the castle of Ramburg. Other ruins near Ramberg are: Frankenfelsen Castle, Meistersel Castle and Neuscharfeneck Castle. Prominent hills within the municipality include the Drenselberg (524 m), the Schindl Kopf (510 m) and the Hühnerkopf (477 m).

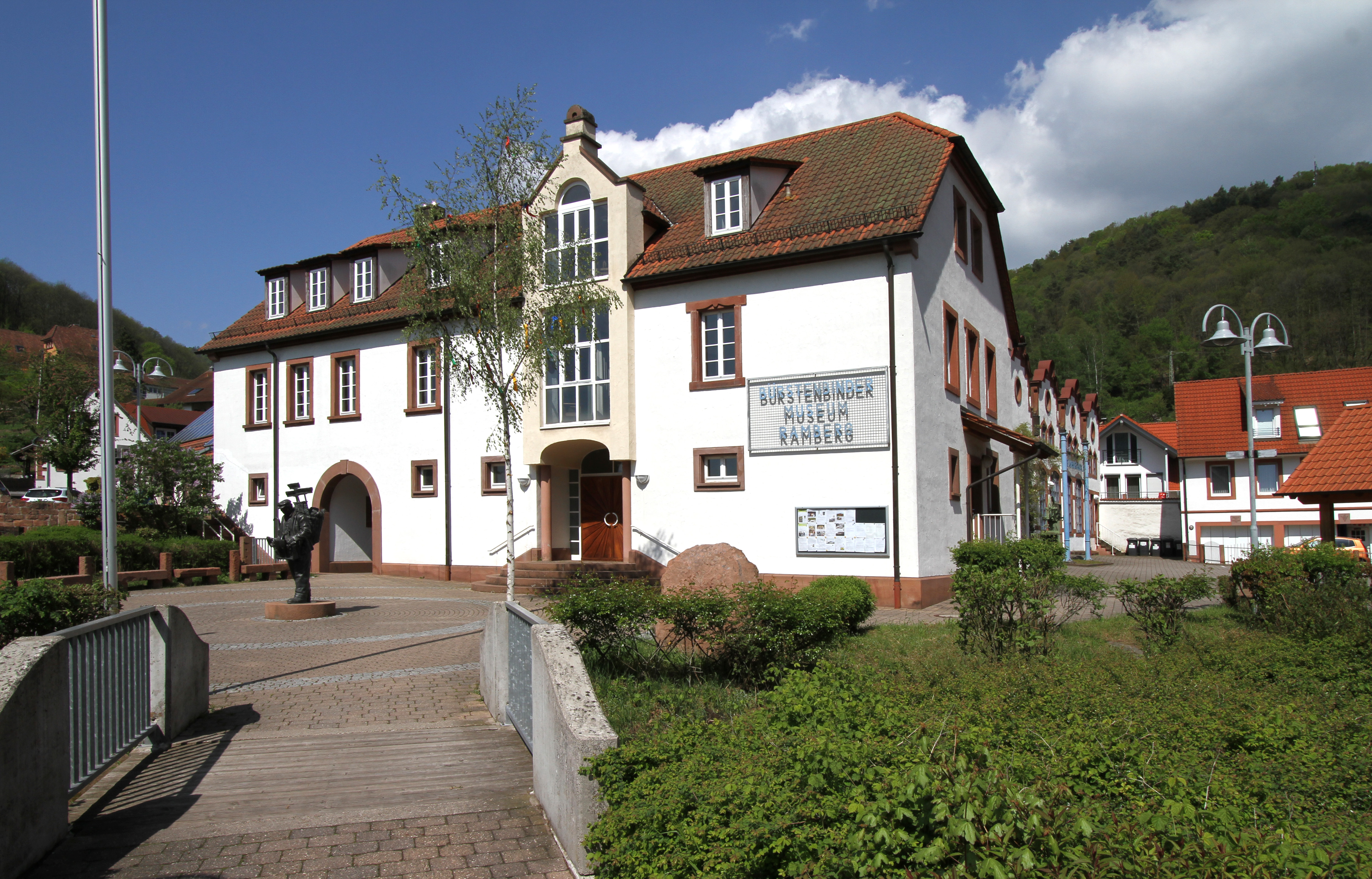
Brushmakers' Museum

The Brushmakers' Museum (German: Bürstenbindermuseum Ramberg) in Ramberg is a local history museum.

The neighbouring villages - clockwise - are Roschbach, Edesheim, Rhodt unter Rietburg, Weyher in der Pfalz, Edesheim, Hainfeld (Pfalz), Burrweiler, Flemlingen, Dernbach (Pfalz), Böchingen, Walsheim and Burrweiler.
