= Ritterstein =

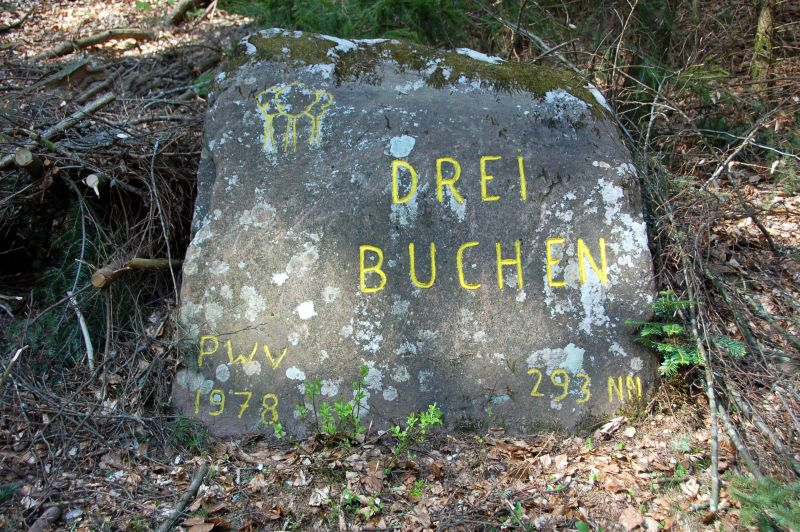
Ritterstein 213, Drei Buchen ("Three Beeches"). Upper left: its symbol (three stylized beech trees); below left: the year it was erected (1978); below right: its height (293 metres)

A Ritterstein ("Ritter Stone") is the German name given to markers made of sandstone erected at sites of historic or natural interest in the Palatine Forest, a range of low mountains in the German state of Rhineland-Palatinate. In some cases, glacial erratics were used, in others, rocks or walls at the site were used on which to carve the information.

The stones are typically inscribed with their name, a suitable symbol, the date they were erected, their height above sea level and the initials PWV for the Pfälzerwald-Verein or Palatine Forest Club, who set up and look after the stones. They are named after chief forester, Karl Albrecht von Ritter (died 1917), the founding chairman of the PWV, who initiated the system in the early 20th century.

== Literature ==
- Walter Eitelmann; Ernst Kimmel (2005), Rittersteine im Pfälzerwald : Mit 59 Wandervorschlägen (in German) (5. ed.), Neustadt an der Weinstr.: Pfälzerwald-Verein, ISBN 3-00-003544-3
- Landesamt für Vermessung und Geobasisinformation Rheinland-Pfalz, Naturpark Pfälzerwald : Topografische Karte 1:25000 (in German), ISBN 978-3-89637-399-1
- Erhard Rohe (2002), "Die Rittersteine im Pfälzerwald", in Pfälzerwald-Verein (ed.), 100 Jahre Pfälzerwald-Verein (in German), Neustadt an der Weinstr., pp. 168–173, ISBN 3-00-010517-4
