= Brushmakers' Museum, Ramberg =

German history museum

Coordinates: 49.26129°N 8.0088°E

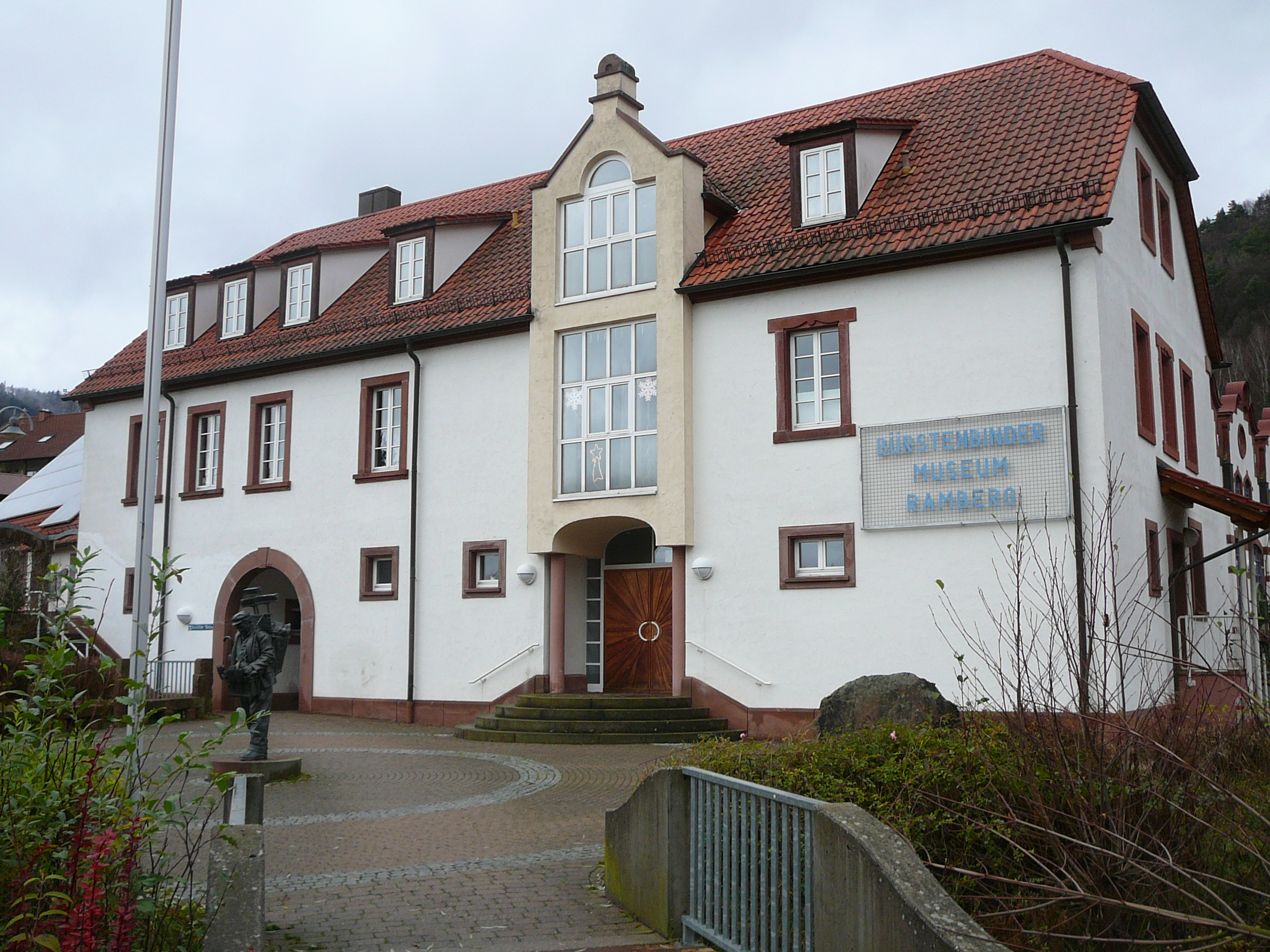
The Brushmaker's Museum in Ramberg (Pfalz)

The Brushmakers' Museum (German: Bürstenbindermuseum Ramberg) in Ramberg is a local history museum in the village of Ramberg in the German state of Rhineland-Palatinate. The responsible body that set the museum up in 1997 and has run it since then is the Local History and Museum Society of the Brushmakers' Workshop, Ramber (Heimat- und Museumsverein des Bürstenmacherhandwerks Ramberg e. V.).

== Geography ==
Ramberg is part of the collective municipality of Annweiler am Trifels in the county of Südliche Weinstraße. The specialist museum in the village centre west of the high street (Hauptstraße), the Landesstraße 506, is housed in an old brush factory that, following a major strike in 1907 was formed on a co-operative basis.

== History ==
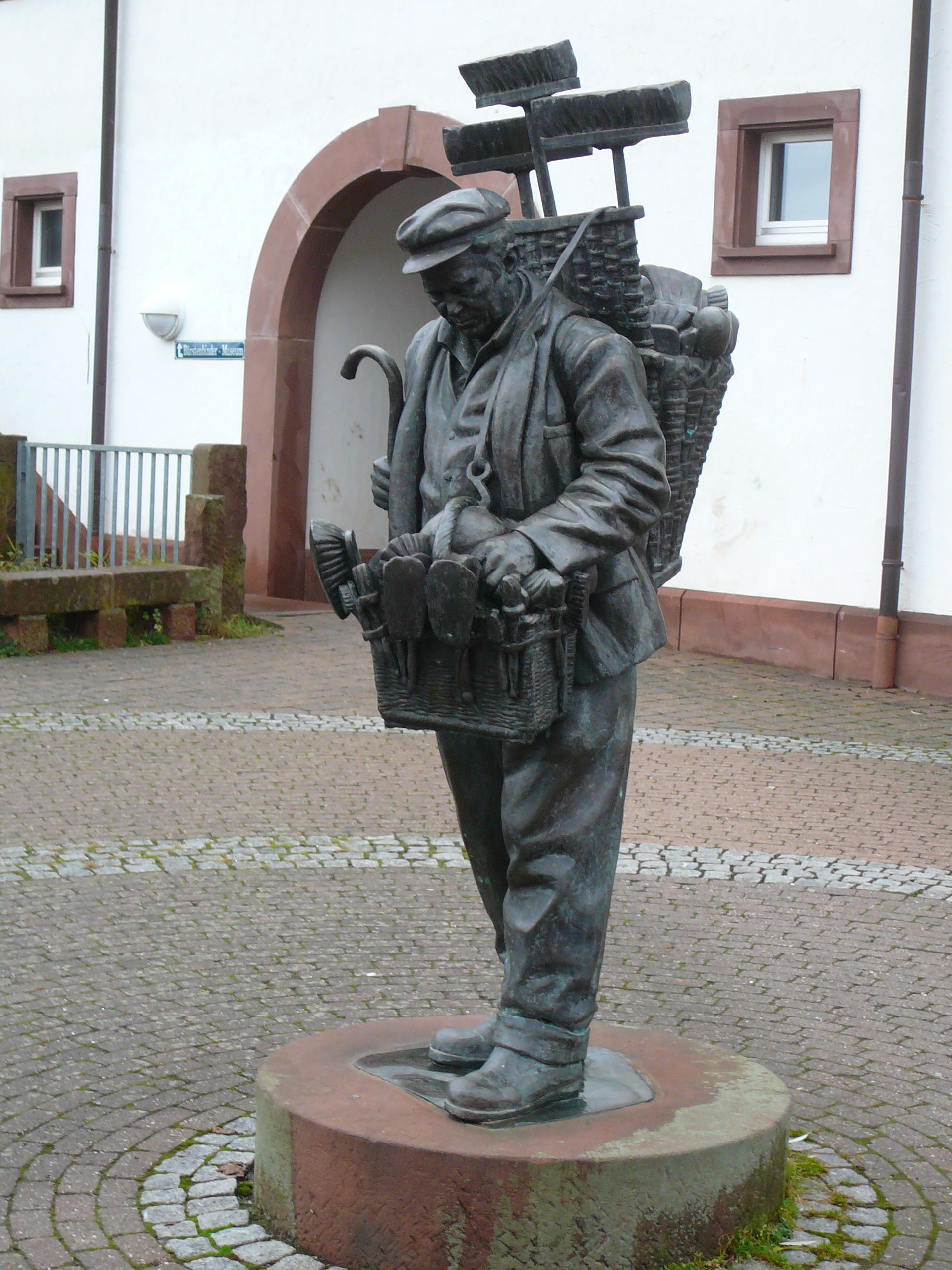
Figure of a Ramberg brush merchant

Since the 18th century, the municipality of Ramberg has been known beyond the boundaries of the Palatinate region for its brushmakers and brush merchants; for a long time these were almost the only occupations that were undertaken in this remote corner of the Palatinate Forest. Initially brushmaking was a cottage industry with brushes and brooms, scrubbers and similar everyday articles made painstakingly by hand in the home, it later became a factory-based activity. For example, in 1907 there were eight brush and brushwood factories in Ramberg. The raw materials, especially wood and Common Broom, were obtained inter alia from the Holpertal valley, which begins just northeast of Ramberg. The Ramberg brush merchants sold their wares not just across the whole of Germany, but also in other European countries.

== Museum ==
The museum offers insights into the occupations of the brushmakers and brush merchants. With the aid of diverse exhibits it portrays the industrial and social development in Ramberg from about 1800 to the time around 1970. Guided tours by experts inform the visitor about the history, manufacture and marketing of brooms and brushes. On view are, for example, technical implements used in brush production, a range of still working machines and the live-size figure of a Ramberg brush merchant in his original dress and equipment. In addition there is an overview of family life in Ramberg from 1780 to 1960.

== Literature ==
- Roland Paul (1987), Michael Geiger u. a. (ed.), "Von alten Berufen im Pfälzerwald", Der Pfälzerwald, Porträt einer Landschaft (in German), Landau (Pfalz): Verlag Pfälzische Landeskunde, pp. 239–252
