= Landeck Castle (Palatinate) =

- Burg Landeck
- Klingenmünster
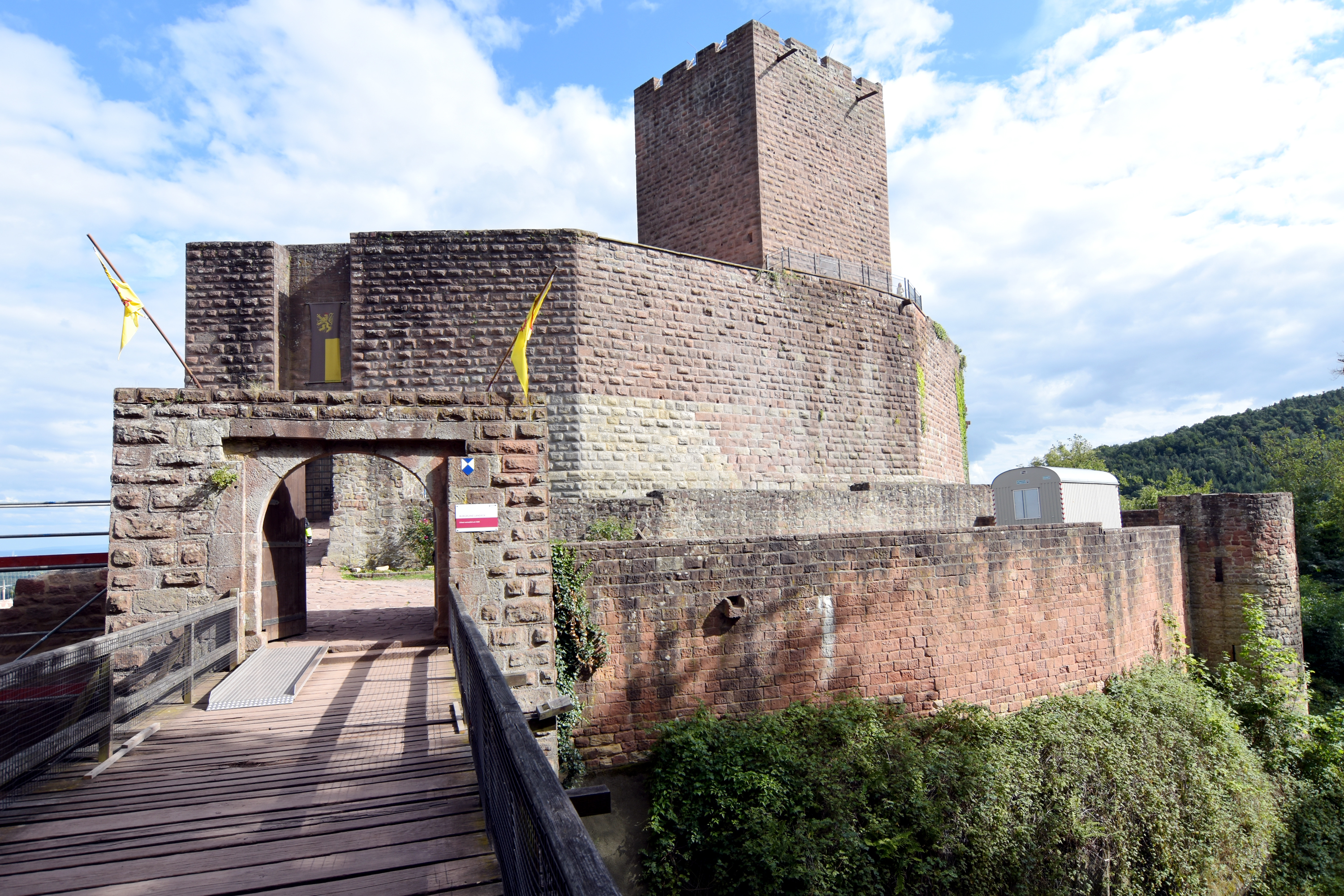
- Landeck Castle

Site information
- Type: hill castle
- Code: DE-RP
- Condition: ruin

Location
- Coordinates: 49°08′28″N 8°00′22″E

Site history
- Built: around 1200
- Materials: Half-timbered, stone

Landeck Castle (German: Burg Landeck) is a ruined hill castle southwest of Landau, near Klingenmünster in the county of Südliche Weinstraße in the German state of Rhineland-Palatinate.

== Gallery ==
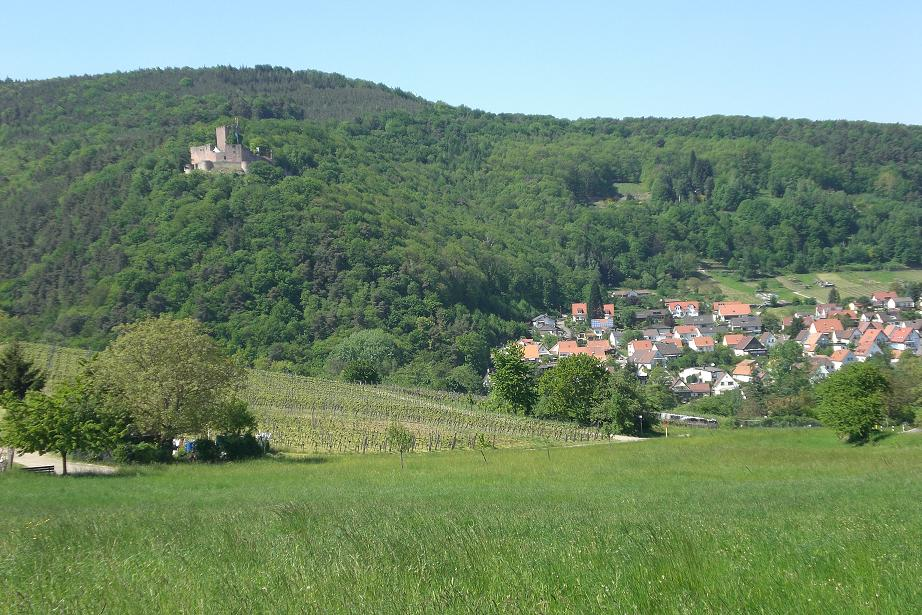

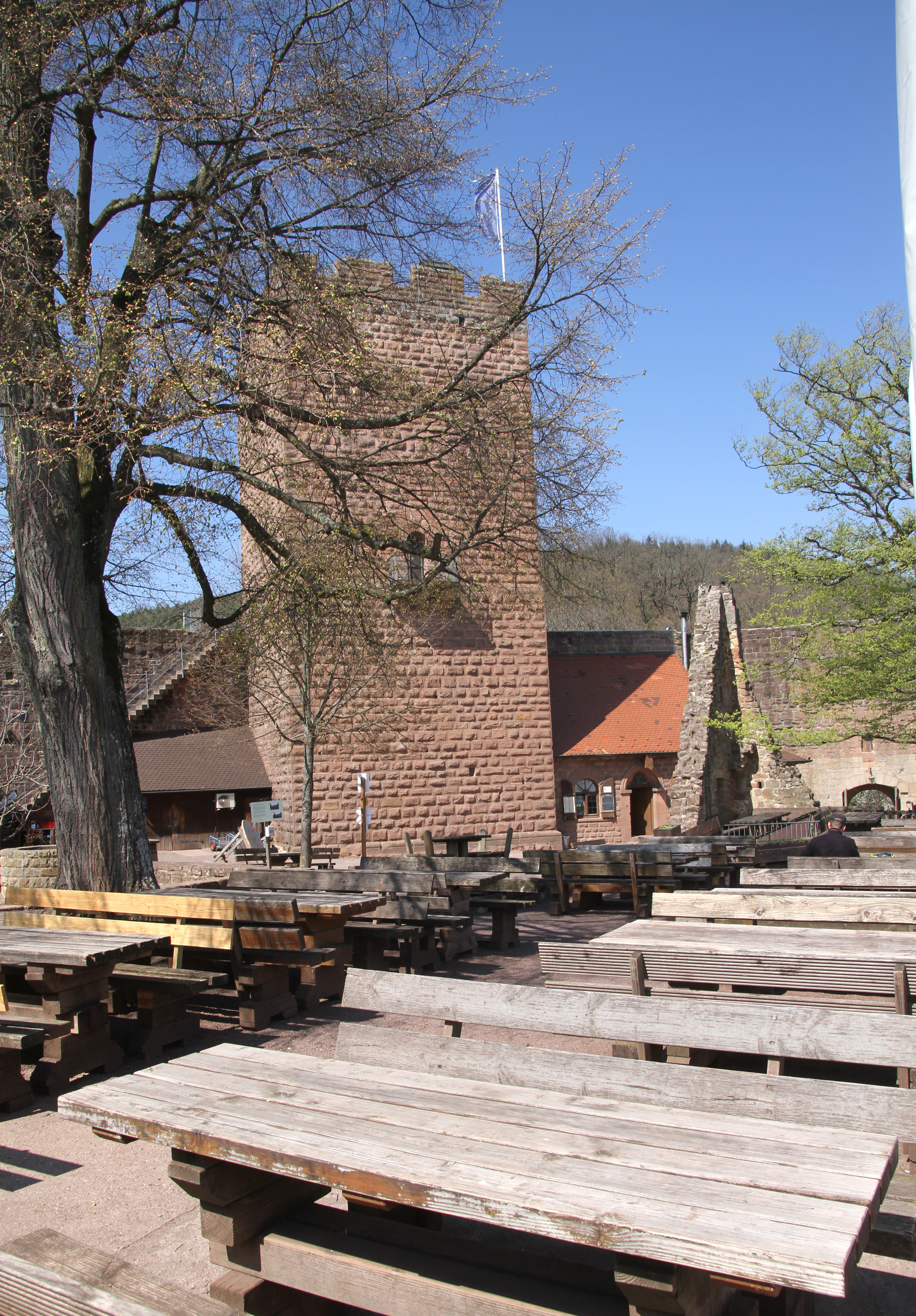

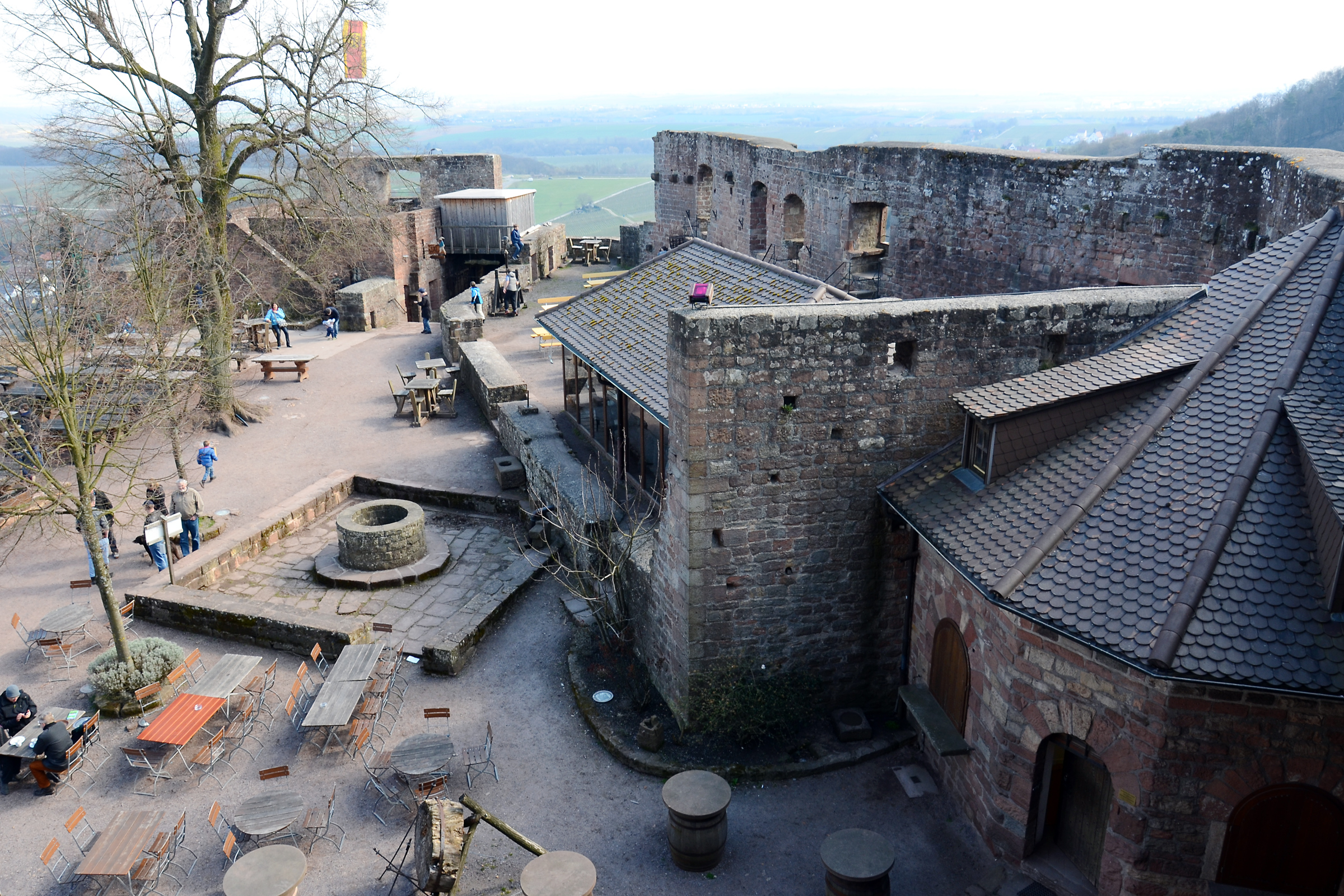

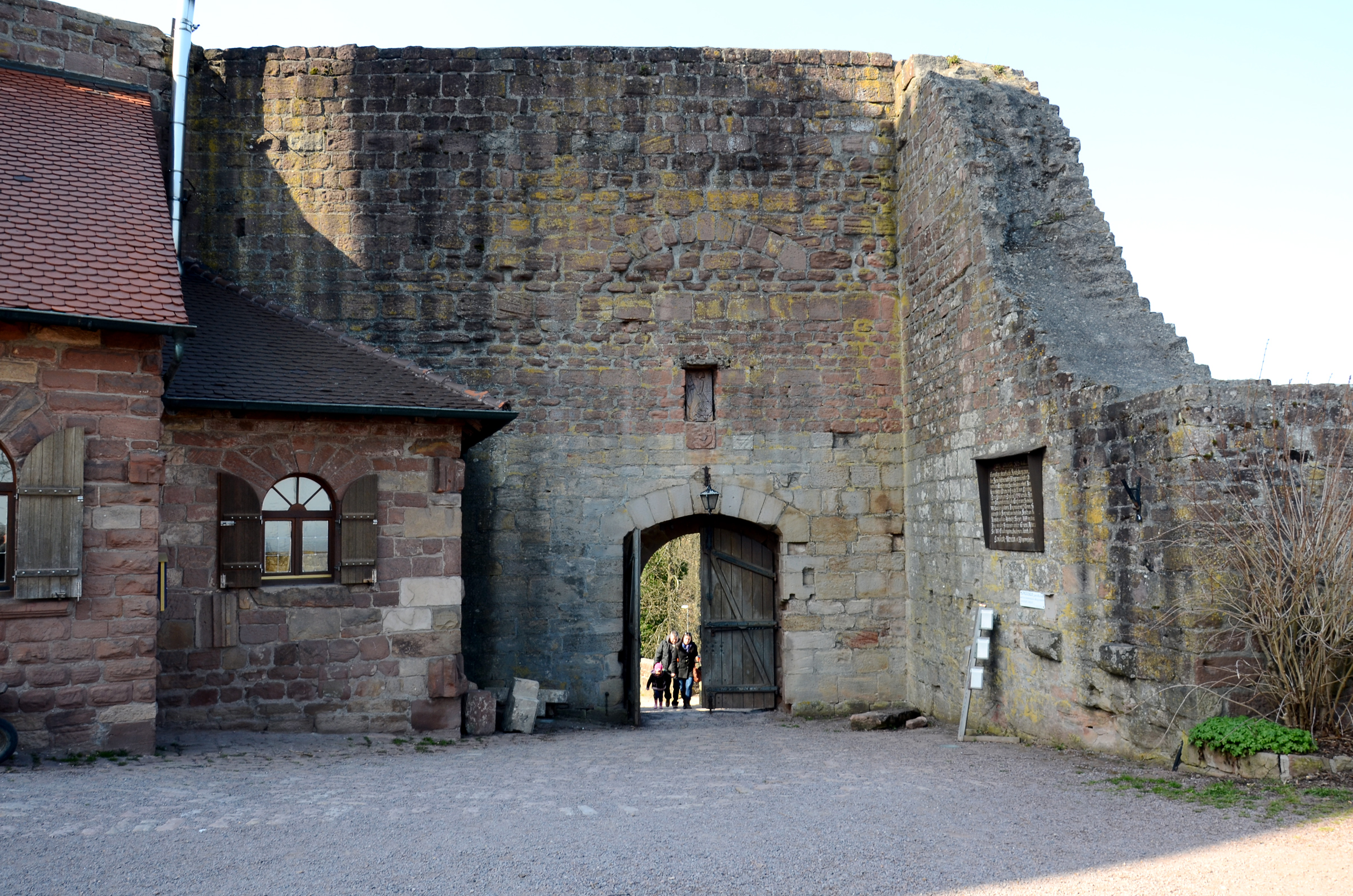

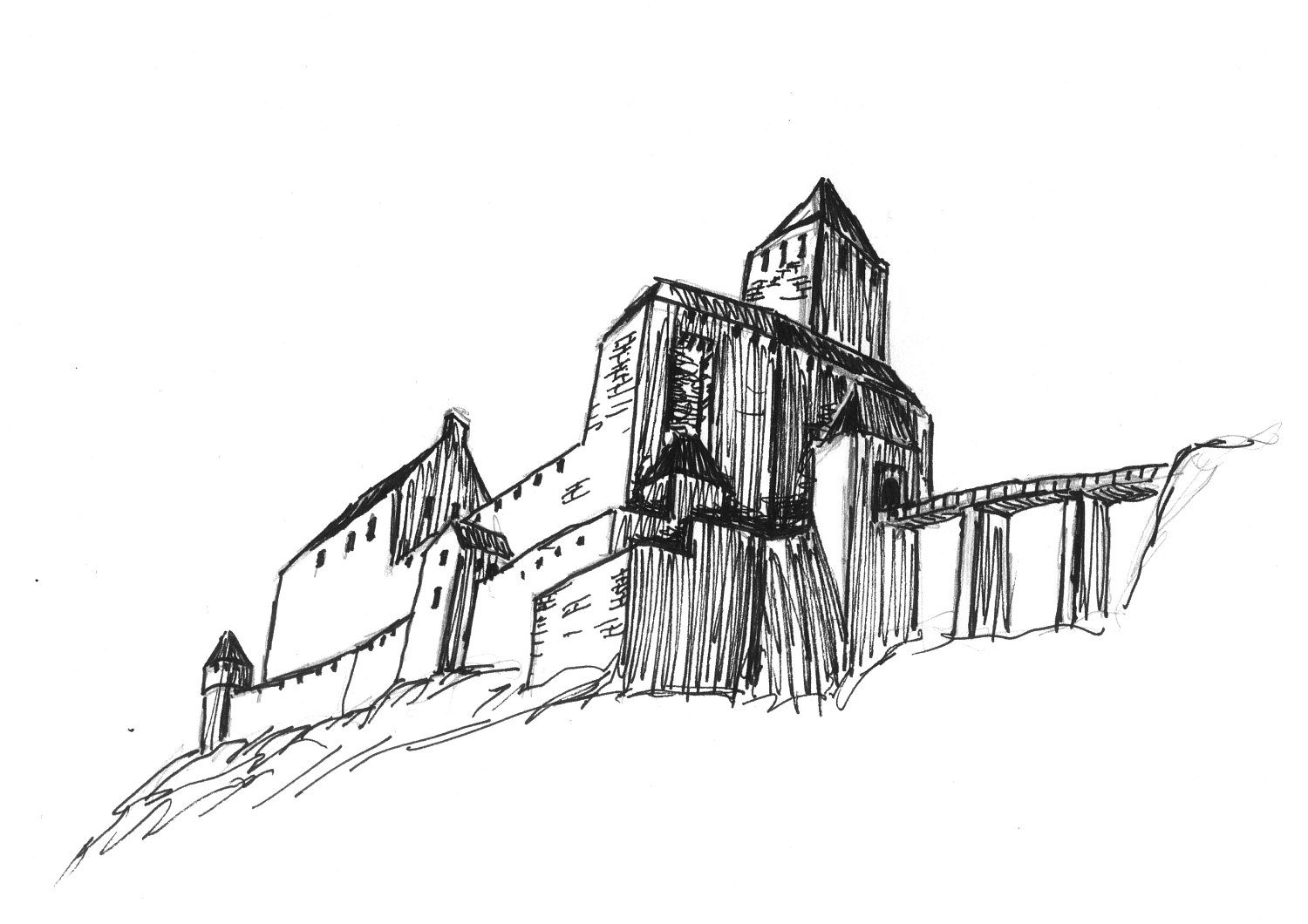

== Literature ==
- Marco Bollheimer (2011), Felsenburgen im Burgenparadies Wasgau–Nordvogesen (3. ed.), Selbstverlag: Karlsruhe, p. 158 f, ISBN 978-3-9814506-0-6
- Alexander Thon, Hans Reither, Peter Pohlit: Burgruine Landeck. Schnell + Steiner, Regensburg 2005, ISBN 3-7954-1713-9.
- Alexander Thon (Hrsg.): ... wie eine gebannte, unnahbare Zauberburg. Burgen in der Südpfalz. 2., verb. Aufl. Schnell + Steiner, Regensburg 2005, S. 80–85, ISBN 3-7954-1570-5.
- Alexander Thon, „Es ist keine Kunde auf uns gekommen, von welchem Beherrscher des teutschen Reiches dieselbe erbaut worden sei …“. Anmerkungen zu Ermittlung und Bewertung der Ersterwähnung pfälzischer Burgen, in: Mythos Staufer – in memoriam Dankwart Leistikow – Akten der 5. Landauer Staufertagung 1.-3. Juli 2005, hrsg. v. Volker Herzner u. Jürgen Krüger, Speyer 2010, S. 127–139, hier S. 129f. (zu Ersterwähnung und Besitzverhältnissen). ISBN 3-932155-27-0
