= Frankenburg (Palatinate) =

Coordinates: 49°16′36″N 8°02′19″E

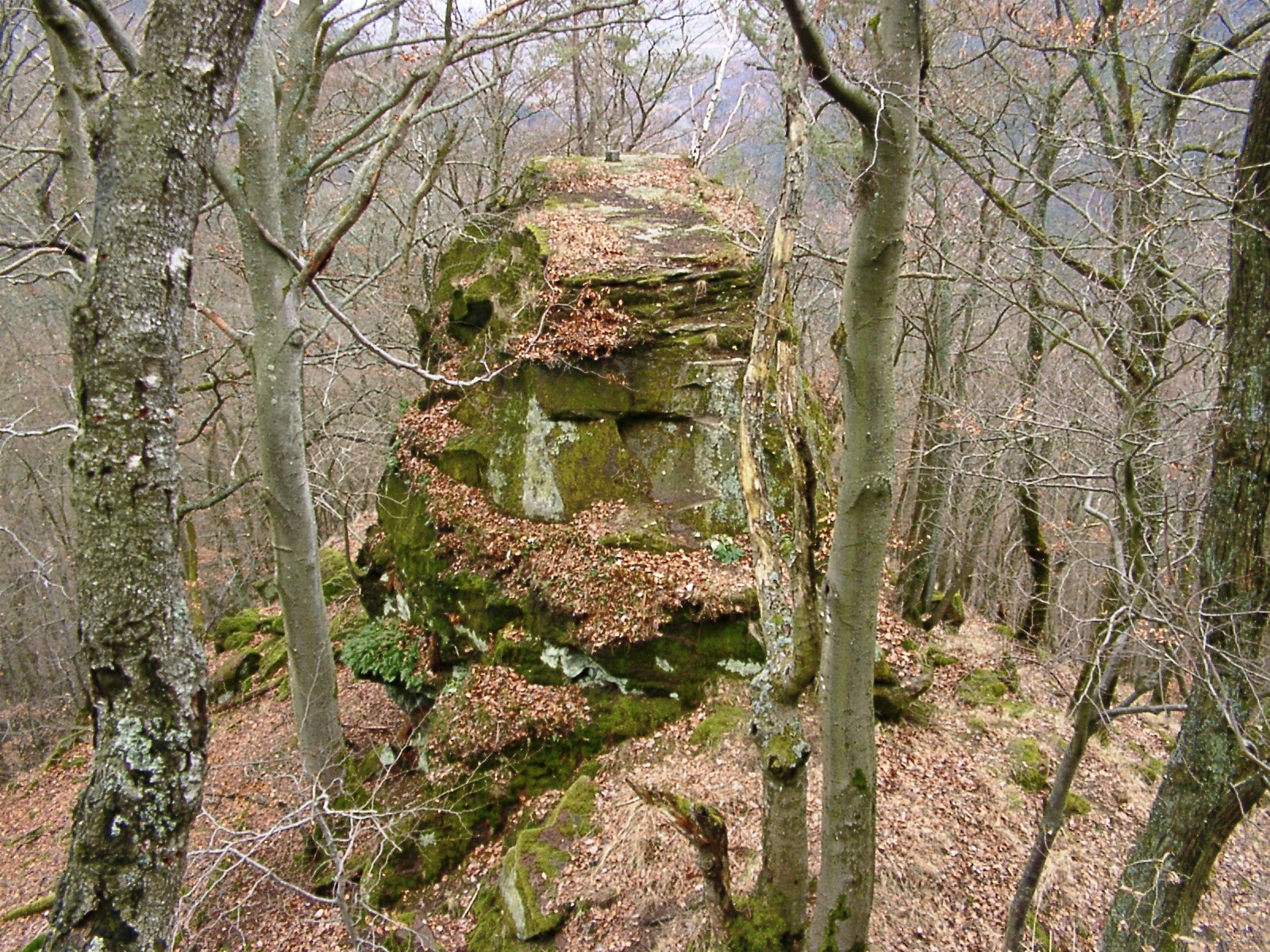
Part of the Frankenfelsen rocks

The Frankenburg is a natural monument with the ruins of a rock castle in the county of Südliche Weinstraße in the German state of Rhineland-Palatinate. It lies above the Modenbach valley on a rocky outcrop of the Frankenberg called the Frankenfelsen and was built to guard the road opposite Meistersel Castle.

Today, all that remains of the Frankenburg are a few wall remnants and manmade traces on the rock. The rocky outcrop on the Frankenberg lies at a height of 545 metres above sea level.

== History ==
The first record of the castle dates to 1327, when James of Ruppertsberg opened the castle to Count Jofried of Leiningen on the occasion of an Urfehde, a sworn agreement not to feud. Before 1353 the Frankenburg was under the rule of the lords of Dahn. In the 15th century it was presumably abandoned and fell into ruins.

== Description ==
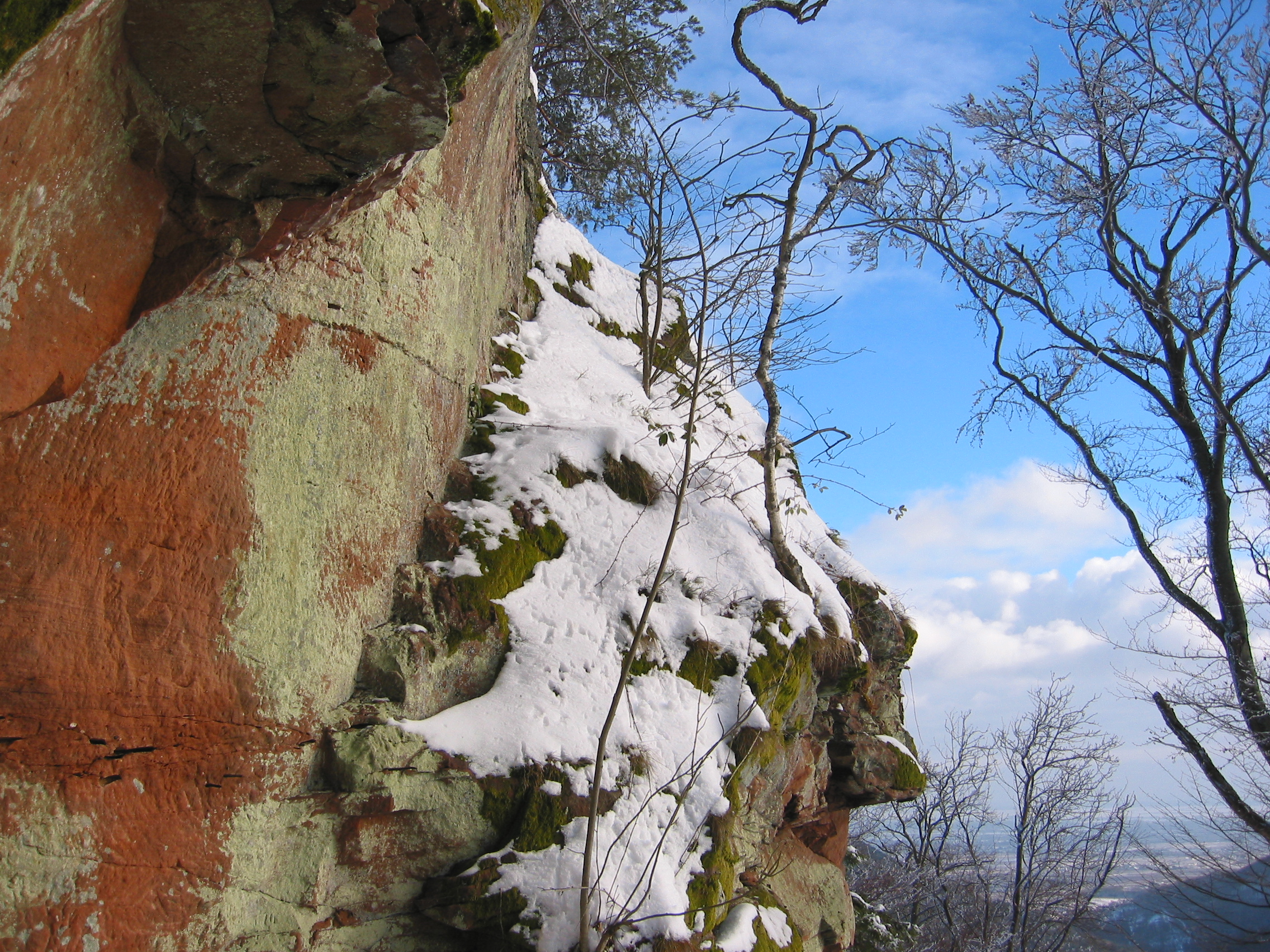
Entrance to the upper ward

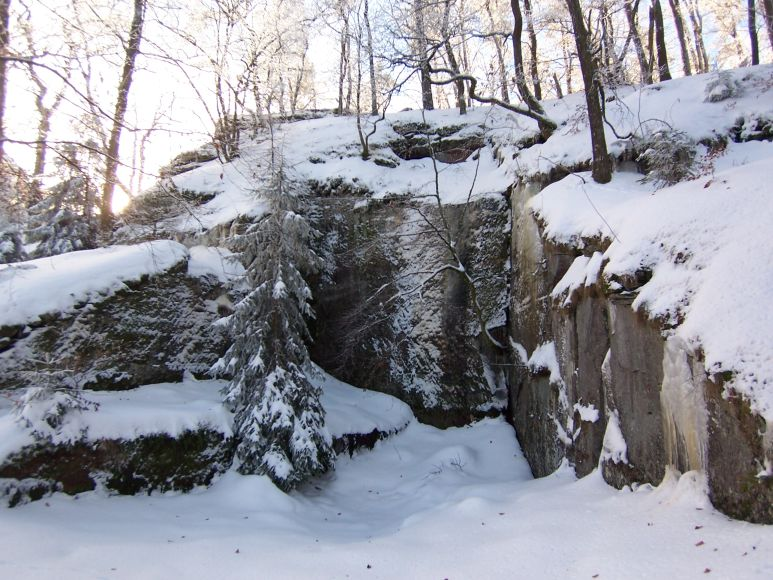
Moat on the NE side

The castle stands on a rock whose sides have been vertically cut. Visitors may reach the castle using a rock staircase. The bergfried probably stood on the top of the rock with the palas below it. and there appear to have been wooden huts on the castle rock, supported on beams that fitted into the putlock holes on the rock. A few small remains of a curtain wall can still be made out. Access to the castle is interrupted by a wide neck ditch. Behind this ditch, on the northwestern side is a moat hewn out of the rock.

The rusticated ashlars are still visible and individual pottery finds suggest that the castle dates roughly to the 13th century.

== Literature ==
- Jürgen Keddigkeit (ed.): Pfälzisches Burgenlexikon. Vol. 2. Institut für Pfälzische Geschichte und Volkskunde, Kaiserslautern, 2002, ISBN 978-3-927754-48-5, pp. 111–115.
