= Holperbach =

River in Germany

Location
- Country: Germany
- States: North Rhine-Westphalia and Rhineland-Palatinate

Physical characteristics
- Mouth
  - location: Sieg
  - coordinates: 50.7786°N 7.7027°E
- Length: 14.4 km (8.9 mi)

Basin features
- Progression: Sieg→ Rhine→ North Sea

Holperbach (in its upper course also: Bruchhauser Bach) is a river of North Rhine-Westphalia and Rhineland-Palatinate, Germany. It flows into the Sieg near Wissen.

== See also ==
- List of rivers of North Rhine-Westphalia
- List of rivers of Rhineland-Palatinate
