= Eisbach (Queich) =

River in Germany

Location
- Country: Germany
- State: Rhineland-Palatinate
- Reference no.: DE: 237726

Physical characteristics
- Source
  - location: Origin: Confluence of the Eußerbach and the Dernbach
  - coordinates: 49°13′48″N 7°59′54″E
  - elevation: ca. 174 m above sea level (NN)
- Mouth
  - location: Near Albersweiler into the Queich
  - coordinates: 49°13′06″N 8°00′29″E
  - elevation: ca. 169 m above sea level (NN)
- Length: 1.5 km (with the Eußerbach 10.48 km)

Basin features
- Progression: Queich→ Rhine→ North Sea
- Landmarks: Small towns: Annweiler am Trifels

The Eisbach (German pronunciation: [ˈaɪsbax]) is a left-hand, northern tributary of the River Queich in the county of Südliche Weinstraße in the German state of Rhineland-Palatinate. It is 1.5 km (0.93 mi) long, or 10.48 km (6.51 mi) long if the Eußerbach is counted.

== Course ==
The Eisbach runs through the Palatine Forest first appearing about 1.5 kilometres from where it empties into the Queich. It is formed by the confluence of its right headstream, the Eußerbach, and is left headstream, the Dernbach. It runs in a southeasterly direction through the rural part of the borough of Annweiler am Trifels. A few metres after passing under the Queich Valley Railway, which runs from Landau to Pirmasens, the Eisbach discharges into the Rhine tributary of the Queich immediately southwest of the hamlet of Neumühle.
