= Flemlingen =

- Municipality
- Coat of arms

- Location of Flemlingen within Südliche Weinstraße district
- Interactive map of Flemlingen
- Location within Germany Location within Rhineland-Palatinate
- Coordinates: 49°14′42″N 8°05′46″E
- Country: Germany
- State: Rhineland-Palatinate
- District: Südliche Weinstraße
- Municipal assoc.: Edenkoben

Government
  - Mayor (2019–24): Peter Henrich

Area
  - Total: 3.87 km^{2} (1.49 sq mi)
- Elevation: 196 m (643 ft)

Population (2025-12-31)
  - Total: 388
  - Density: 100/km^{2} (260/sq mi)
- Time zone: UTC+01:00 (CET)
  - Summer (DST): UTC+02:00 (CEST)
- Postal codes: 76835
- Dialling codes: 06323
- Vehicle registration: SÜW
- Website: www.flemlingen.com

Flemlingen is a municipality in Südliche Weinstraße district, in Rhineland-Palatinate, western Germany.
