= Neuscharfeneck Castle =

- Burg Neuscharfeneck
- Flemlingen
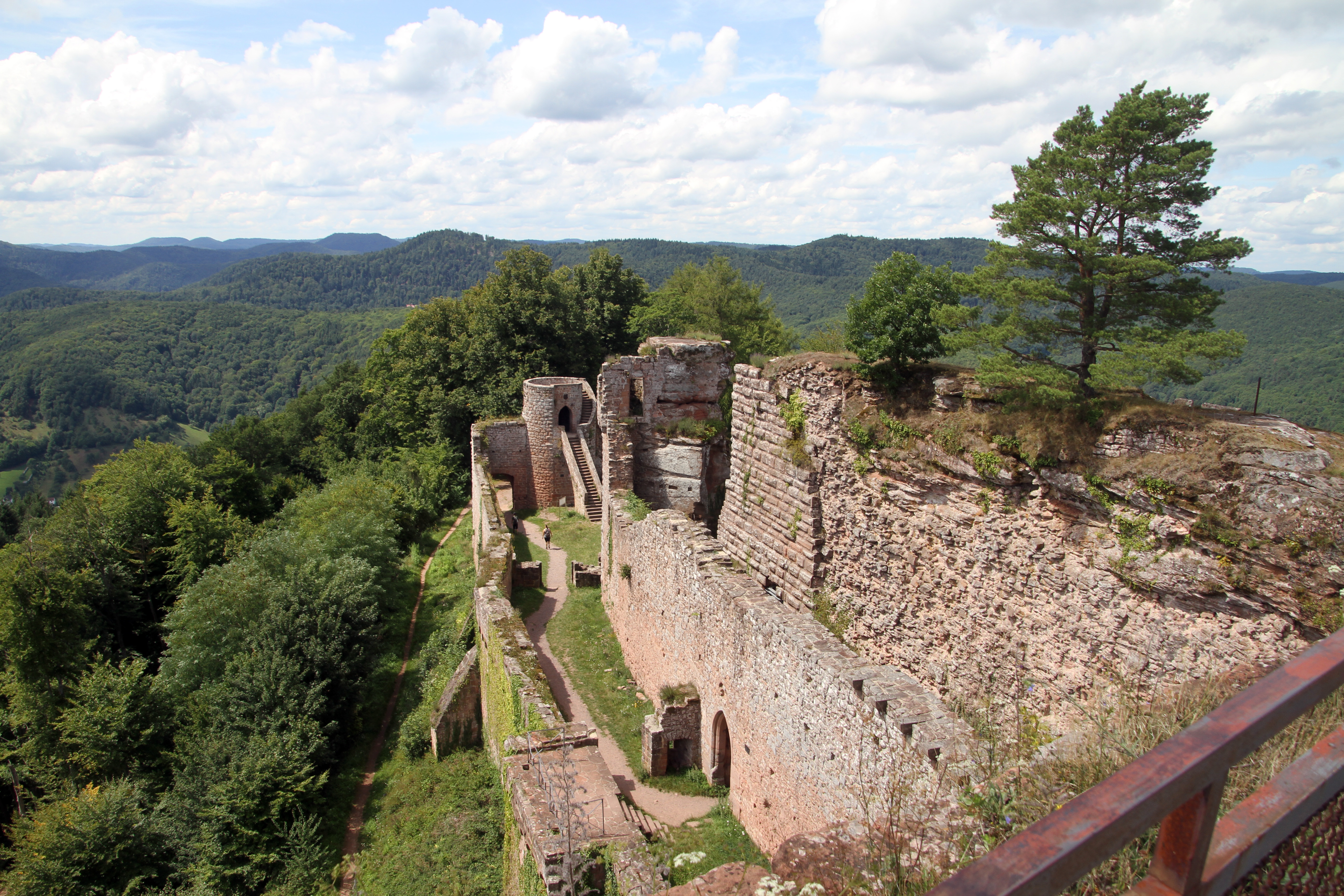

Site information
- Type: hill castle
- Code: DE-RP
- Condition: ruin

Location
- Coordinates: 49°15′10″N 8°01′19″E
- Height: 500 m above sea level (NN)

Site history
- Built: around 1232

The castle of Neuscharfeneck is a ruin and a cultural monument above Ramberg and Dernbach on the territory of an exclave of Flemlingen in the district of Südliche Weinstraße in the west German state of Rhineland-Palatinate.

== Location ==
The ruins are situated in the eastern part of the Palatine Forest. They lie at an elevation of 500 metres (1,600 ft) on the western foothills of the Kalkofen Berg in the middle of a forest and are only accessible over forest tracks.

== Layout ==
The first castle, dating to the 13th century, was considerably smaller than the present ruins. Of the Hochstaufen castle only a few remnants have survived.

The entire site measures about 60 by 150 metres (200 by 490 ft). Its shield wall, built from ca. 1212 to 1232 and extended in the years 1470 and 1530, is the mightiest in the Palatinate, with a length of 58 metres (190 ft) and thickness of 12 metres (39 ft). Within the shield wall there are relatively few usable passages, chambers and casemates. It therefore acted - apart from the hoarding (Plattform) that has not survived - primarily as passive protection for the castle behind it. The original entrance was over a drawbridge through the shield wall into the castle.

In the castle gardens, rare herbs such as White Henbane, Ingräu and Abbey Hysop were planted.

There is still a partially surviving gateway with a flanking tower. Four water basins, chiselled out of the rock in the 13th century, were used as cisterns, that were supplied with rainwater and, from the 16th century, with water from the Roßberg Spring, 2 kilometres (1.2 mi) away, over pipes made of clay or hollow tree trunks.

The 30-metre (98 ft) long upper castle (Oberburg) on the central rock was built from 1212 to 1232 as the first residential building but has not survived, apart from its well and an inaccessible chamber and steps in the rock.

== Gallery ==
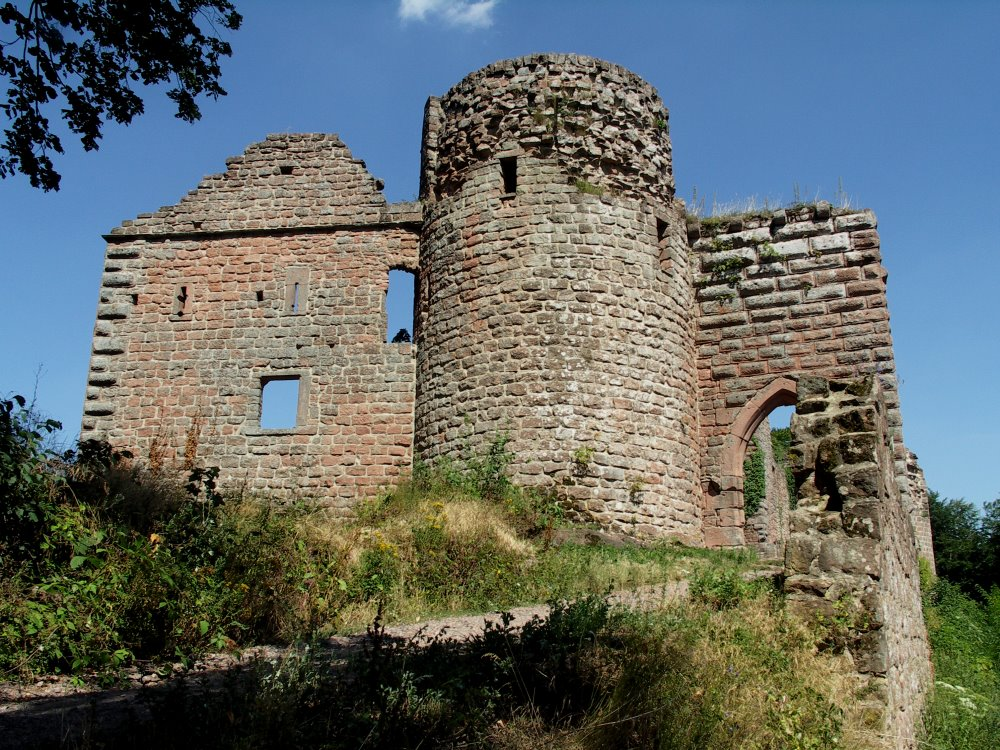
Gate tower from the outside

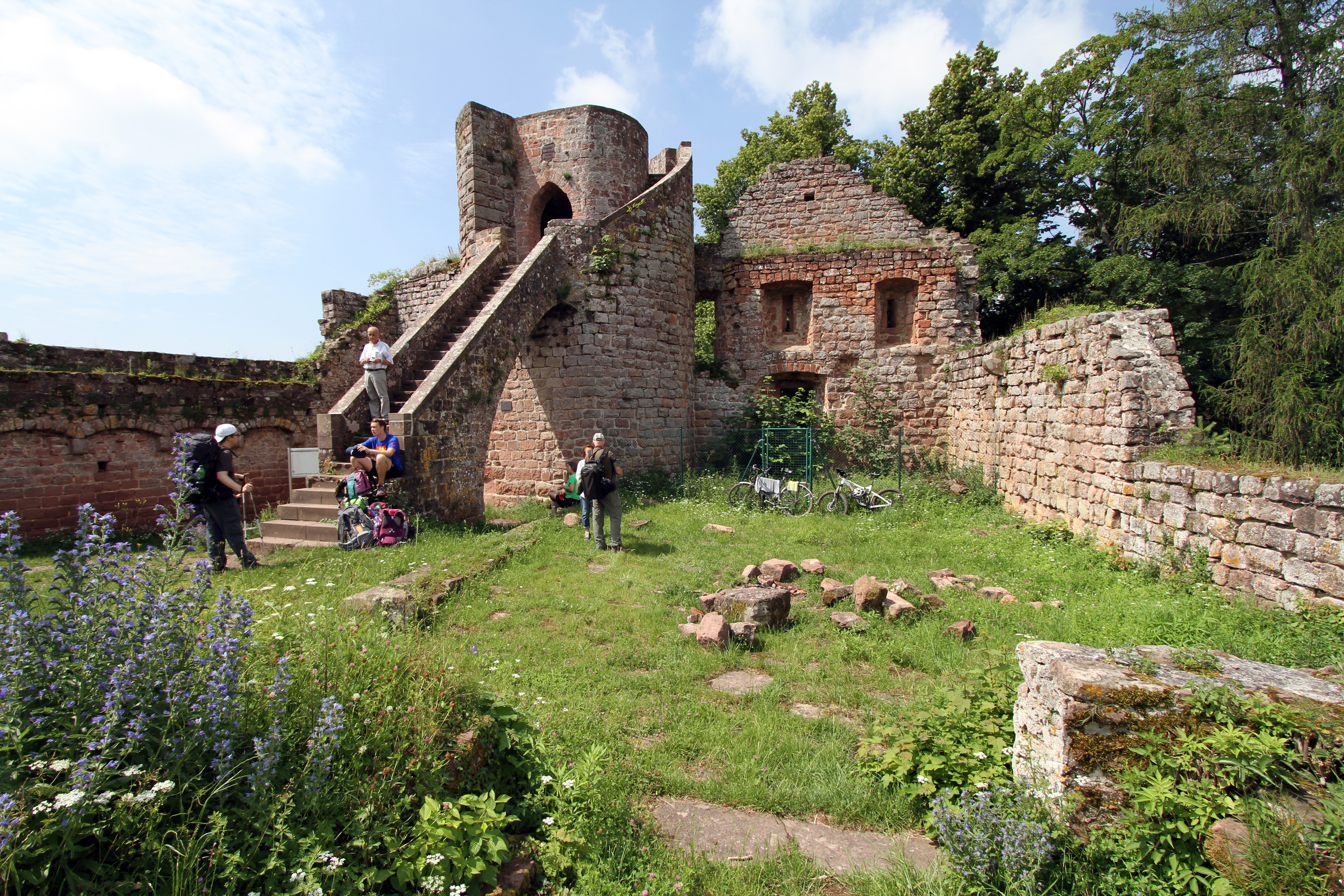
Gate tower from the inner courtyard

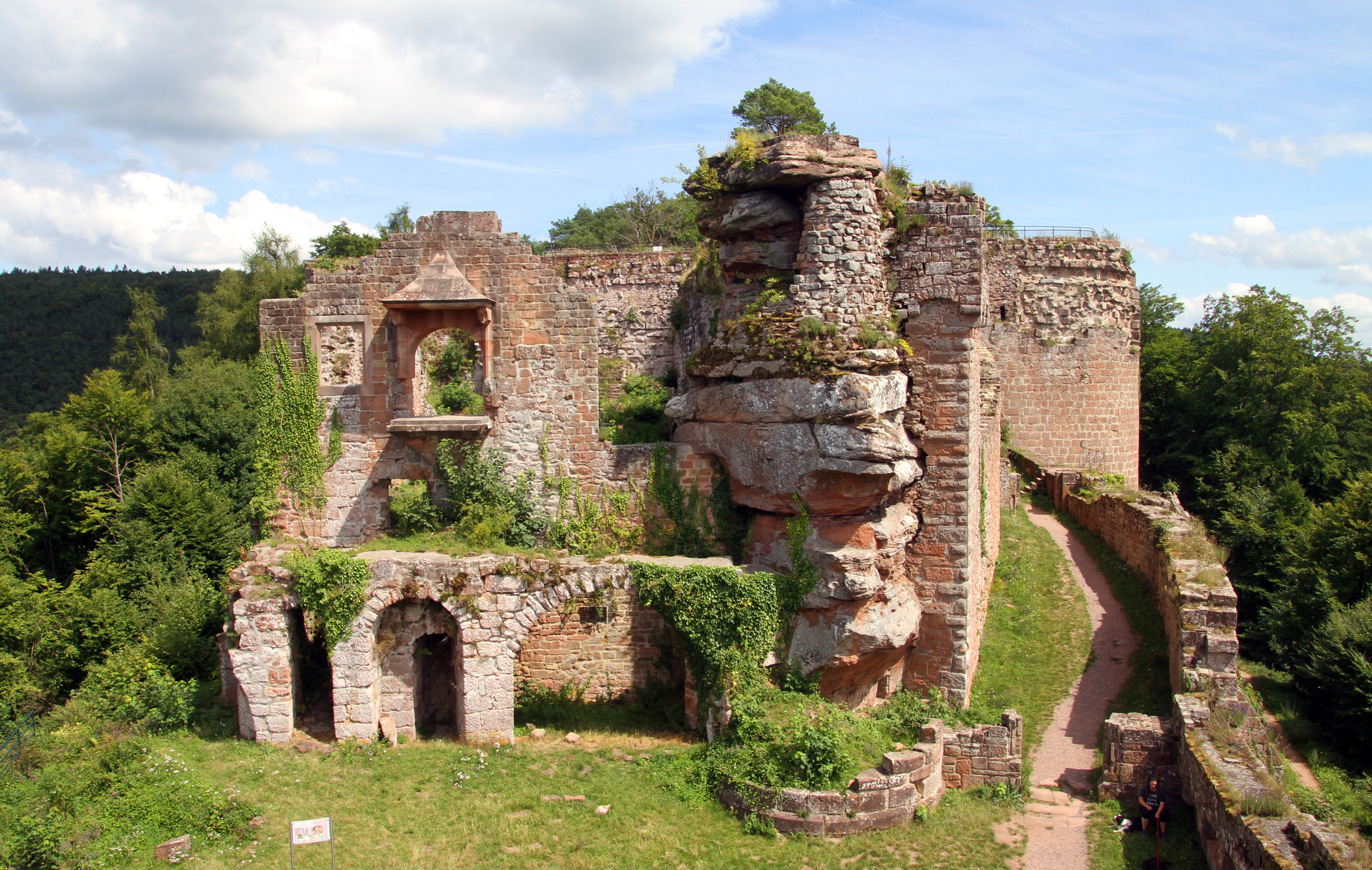
View from the gate tower towards Pallas

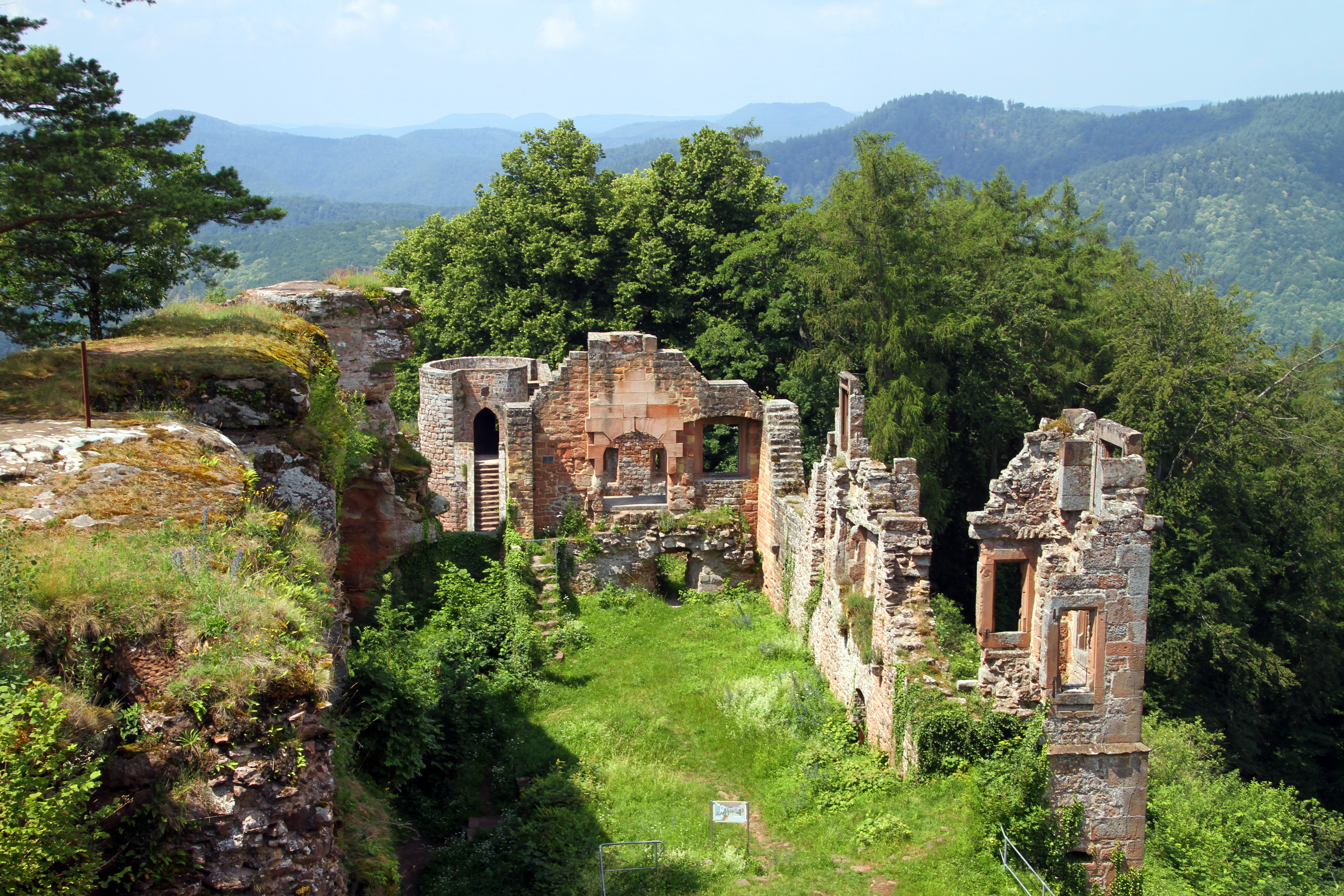
View from the shield wall towards Pallas

== Literature ==
- Marco Bollheimer, ed. (2011), Felsenburgen im Burgenparadies Wasgau - Nordvogesen : 43 descriptions of castles, 471 colour photographs... (in German) (3rd, expanded ed.), Karlsruhe: Verlag M. Bollheimer, pp. 28–31, ISBN 978-3-9814506-0-6
- Rolf Übel: Burg Neuscharfeneck bei Dernbach, Kreis Südliche Weinstraße. Verlag für Burgenkunde und Pfalzforschung, Landau, 1998 ISBN 3-929893-04-5
- Alexander Thon (ed.): "... wie eine gebannte, unnahbare Zauberburg". Burgen in der Südpfalz. 2nd, improved ed., Regensburg, 2005, pp. 122–127. ISBN 3-7954-1570-5
- Walter Herrmann: Auf Rotem Fels, pp. 150–155, Leinfelden-Echterdingen, 2004, ISBN 3-7650-8286-4
- Jochen Goetze: Burgen in der Pfalz, pp. 46–50, Heidelberg, 1991, ISBN 3-921524-94-6
