= Palas =

German medieval castle hall

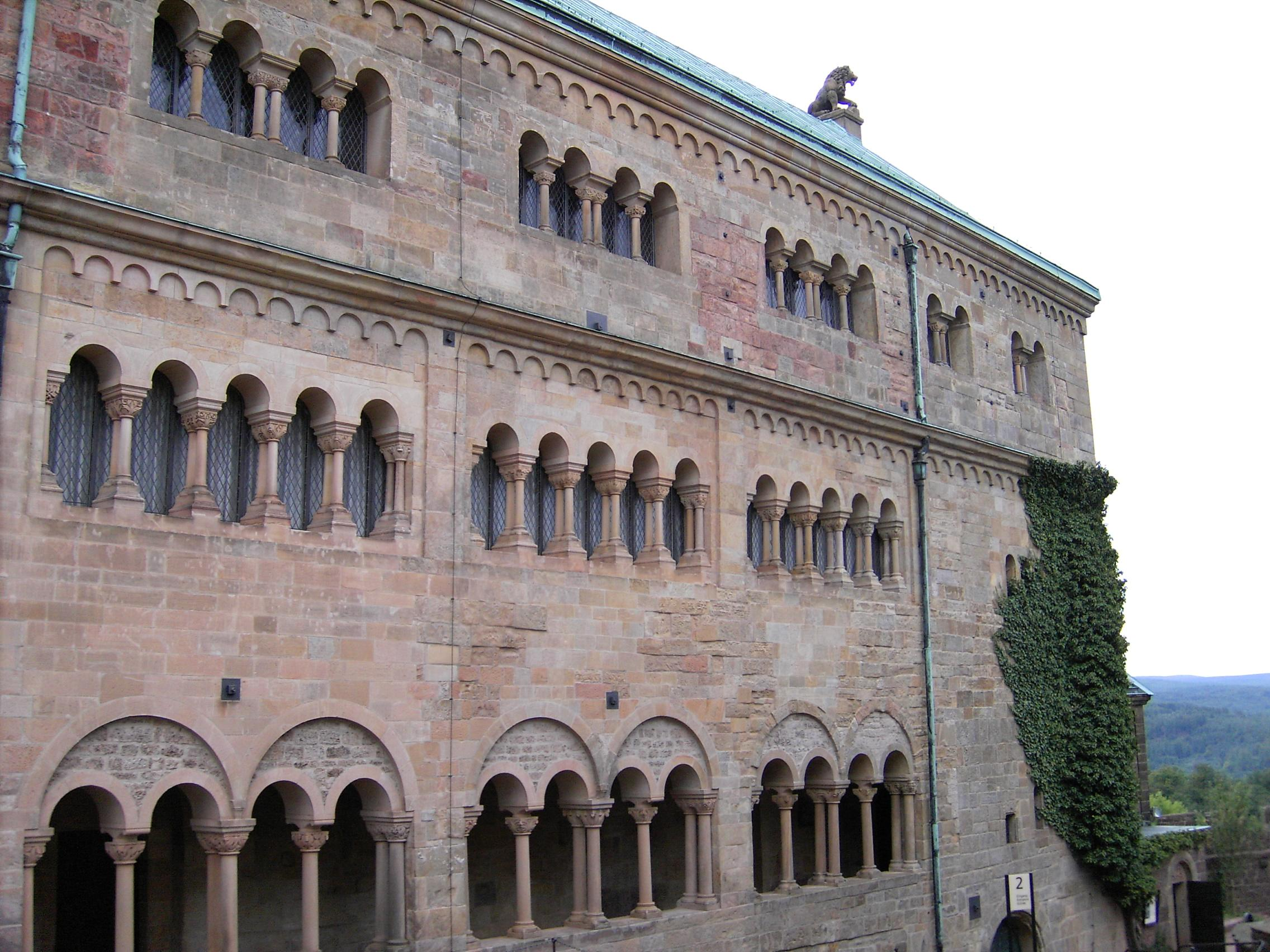
Palas of the Wartburg, courtyard side

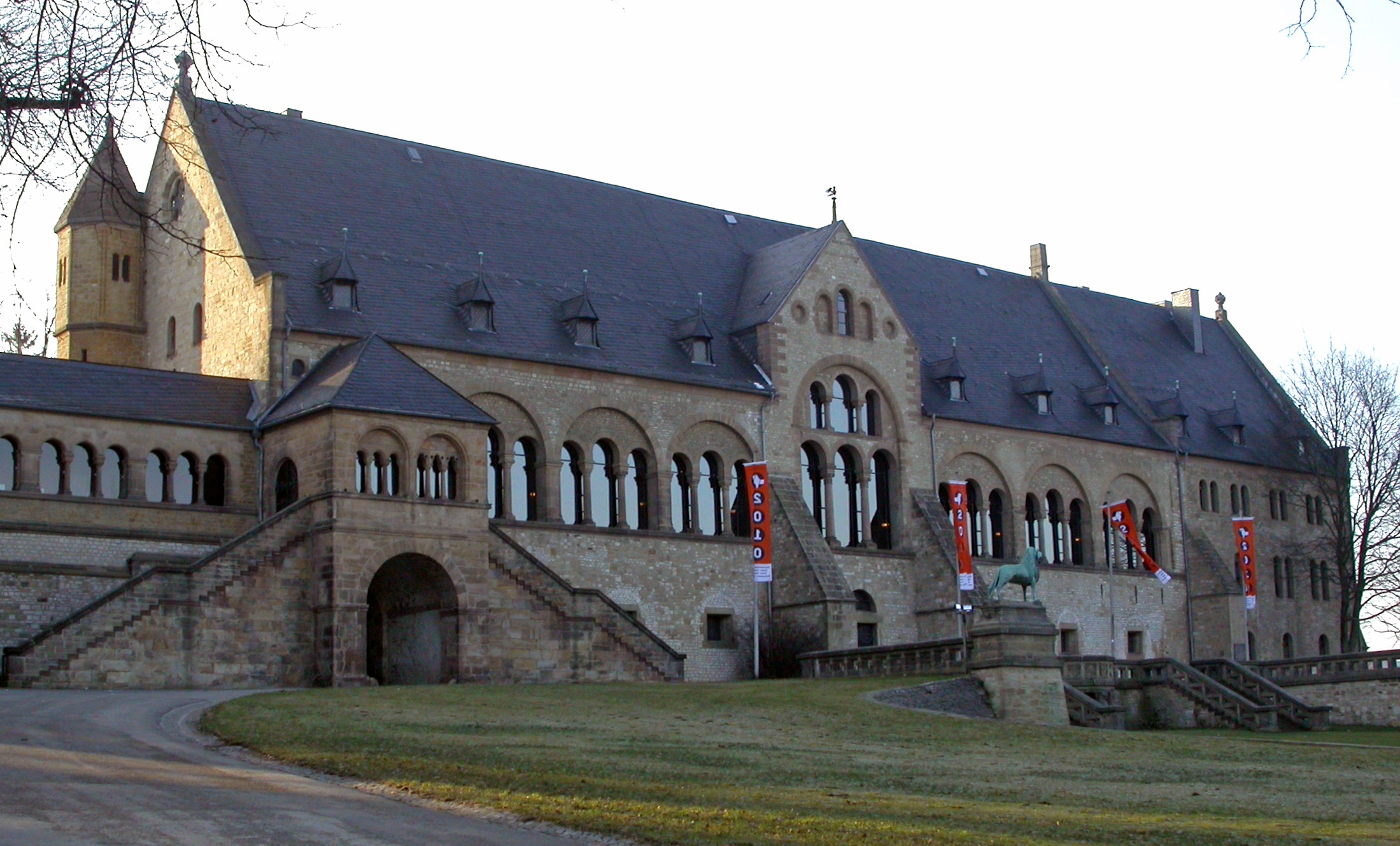
Palas of the Kaiserpfalz Goslar

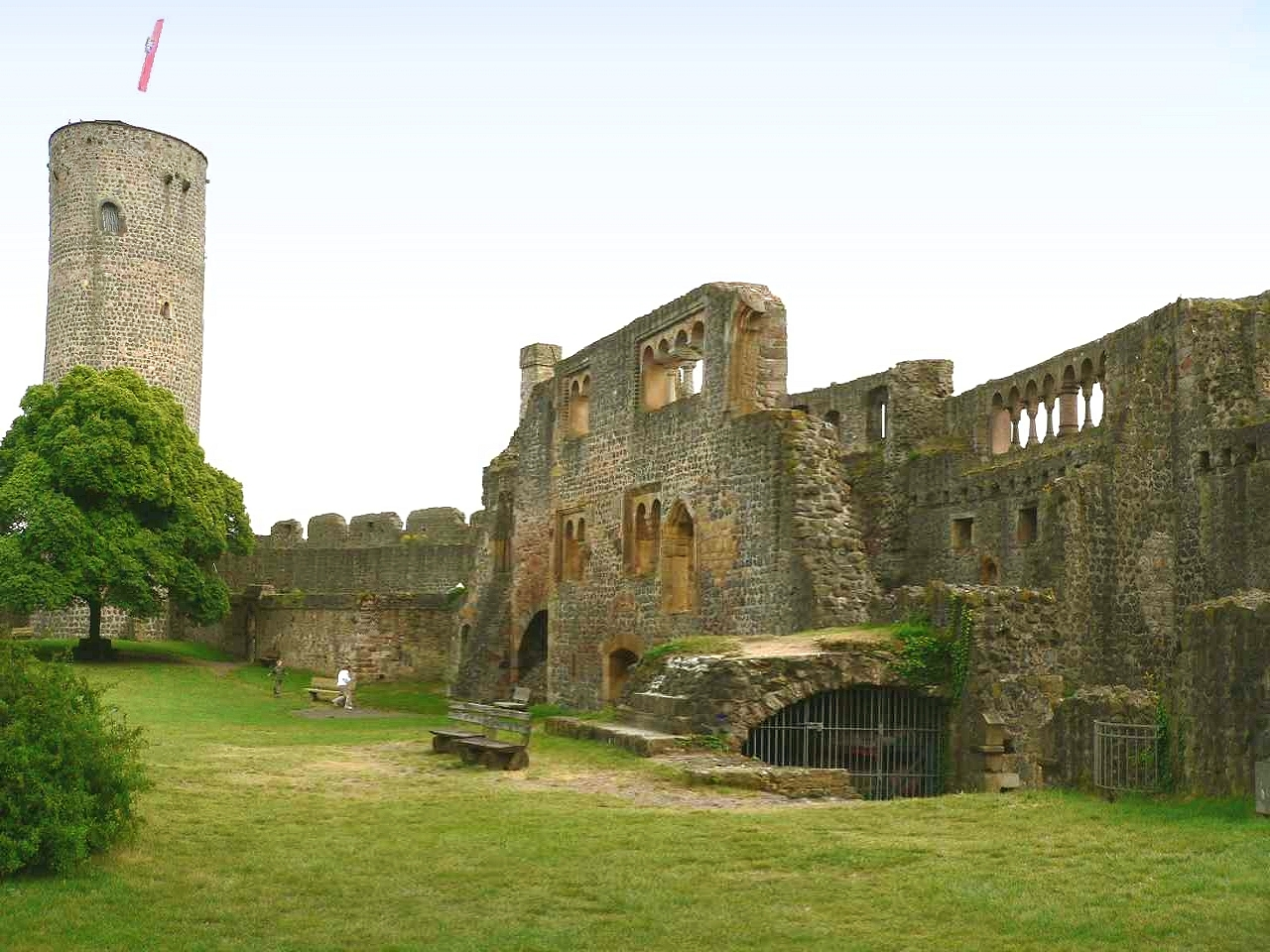
The Münzenberg palas at Münzenberg Castle

A palas (German: [ˈpaːlas]) is a German term for the imposing or prestigious building of a medieval Pfalz or castle that contained the great hall. Such buildings appeared during the Romanesque period (11th to 13th century) and, according to Thompson, are "peculiar to German castles".

Thanks to 19th-century studies of castles ("castle science"), the term palas is often used as a generic term used for covered halls in castles; however, the architectural and historical use of the term is restricted by other authors to the Romanesque hall building.

== Design ==
The stone hall of a palas has an elongated rectangular floor plan. Frequently, the building has cellars or is provided with a basement. The main floors (usually two, sometimes even more) are well lit by arched windows that are often grouped to form arcades. Rich architectural sculpture is often found here in order to enhance the prestige of the hall. The great hall, located on the first floor, occupies the entire floor area of the building and is reached by a separate staircase. Often, the hall is divided by a row of columns into two aisles, but can also be vaulted. Multi-storey palas buildings may also contain several superimposed halls. The great hall was used mainly in the summer, because it was difficult to heat, whilst in winter the cabinet (Kemenate) was the preferred living room. The heated area was often referred to as the Dürnitz and usually located on the ground floor, below the great hall. The palas was usually covered by a gabled roof. According to Robert R. Taylor, "the Palas was usually distinguishable from the keep. Often rectangular In plan and two storeys high, it was constructed over a cellar. On the upper level was a large room, or great hall... Sleeping quarters were often adjacent to or above the great hall. Near at hand were the cistern or well and kitchens. Most castles had chapels, sometimes outside the walls, occasionally over a gateway..."

== Distribution ==
The palas first appeared as a type of building in imperial palaces or Pfalzen, where they could accommodate the king's hall or aula regia. In this room public acts of state took place under the direction of the king, for example imperial court sessions, the administration of justice or the reception of secular and religious dignitaries.

From the second half of the 12th century in the Holy Roman Empire the Romanesque palas was also part of the architecture of a number of castles of the higher nobility. The most important element was still the great hall, which offered a prestigious setting for receptions and parties.

== See also ==
- Palace
- Kaiserpfalz (or Königspfalz)
- Imperial castle (Reichsburg)
