= Dernbach, Südliche Weinstraße =

Dernbach
- Municipality
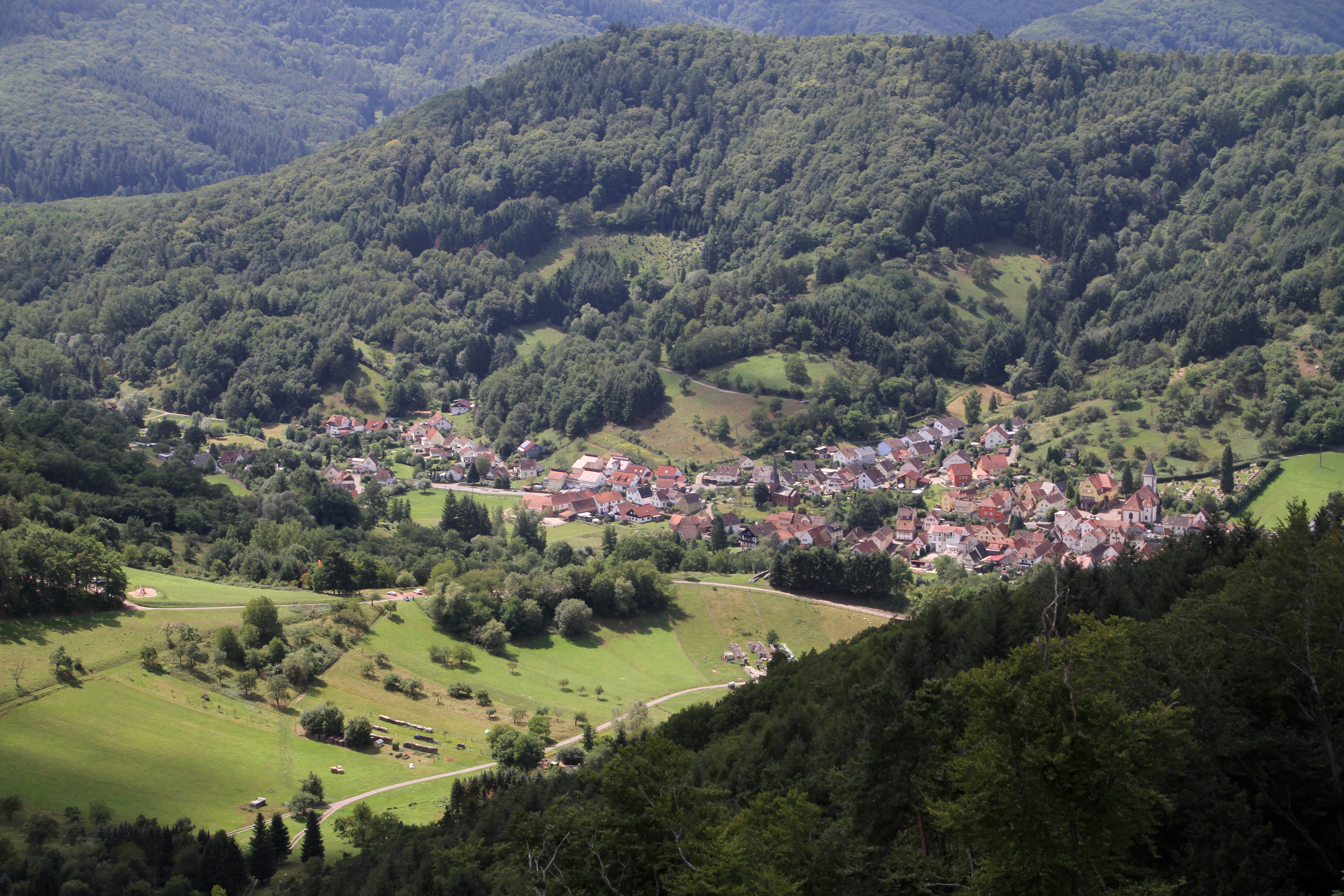

- Coat of arms

- Location of Dernbach within Südliche Weinstraße district
- Interactive map of Dernbach
- Location within Germany Location within Rhineland-Palatinate
- Coordinates: 49°14′55″N 8°0′25″E
- Country: Germany
- State: Rhineland-Palatinate
- District: Südliche Weinstraße
- Municipal assoc.: Annweiler am Trifels

Government
  - Mayor (2019–24): Harald Jentzer

Area
  - Total: 3.86 km^{2} (1.49 sq mi)
- Elevation: 219 m (719 ft)

Population (2025-12-31)
  - Total: 445
  - Density: 115/km^{2} (299/sq mi)
- Time zone: UTC+01:00 (CET)
  - Summer (DST): UTC+02:00 (CEST)
- Postal codes: 76857
- Dialling codes: 06345
- Vehicle registration: SÜW
- Website: www.dernbach-pfalz.de

Dernbach (German pronunciation: [ˈdɛʁnbax]) is a municipality in the Südliche Weinstraße district, in Rhineland-Palatinate, Germany.
