= Meistersel Castle =

Ruined castle in Germany

- Burg Meistersel, Burg Modeneck, Modenbacher Schloss
- Ramberg
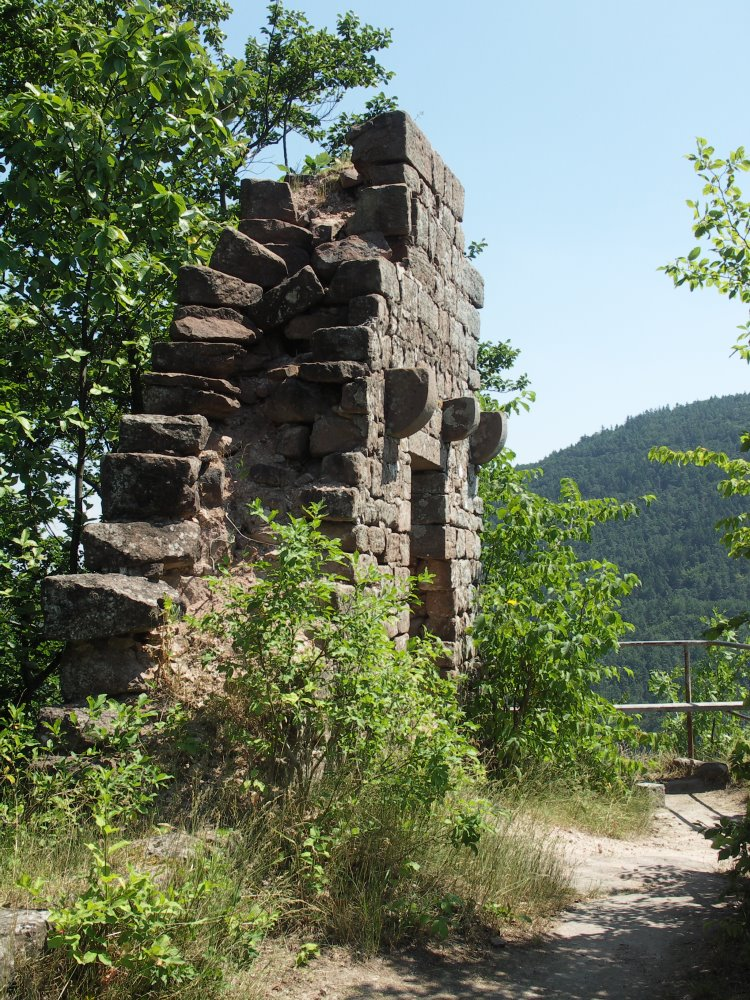
- Wall remains of the palas in the upper ward

Site information
- Type: hill castle, rock castle
- Code: DE-RP
- Condition: curtain walls

Location
- Coordinates: 49°16′25″N 8°01′27″E
- Height: 492 m above sea level (NN)

Site history
- Built: 1000 to 1100 A.D.

Garrison information
- Occupants: clerics, nobility

Meistersel Castle is a ruined castle near Ramberg on the outskirts of the Palatinate Forest in Rhineland-Palatinate, Germany. It is located on a 492-metre-high hilltop that towers above the Modenbach valley near the Three Beeches pass (Drei Buchen) on the road from Ramberg to Edenkoben.

Meistersel Castle is one of the oldest castles in the Palatinate. Its name is derived from the words Meister ("master") and Saal ("hall") and hence the term Meister des Saales or master of the hall/chamberlain. It is likely that it was a seat for ministeriales of the imperial castle of Trifels. Its other name, Modeneck, comes from the name of the nearby stream.
