= Orensberg =

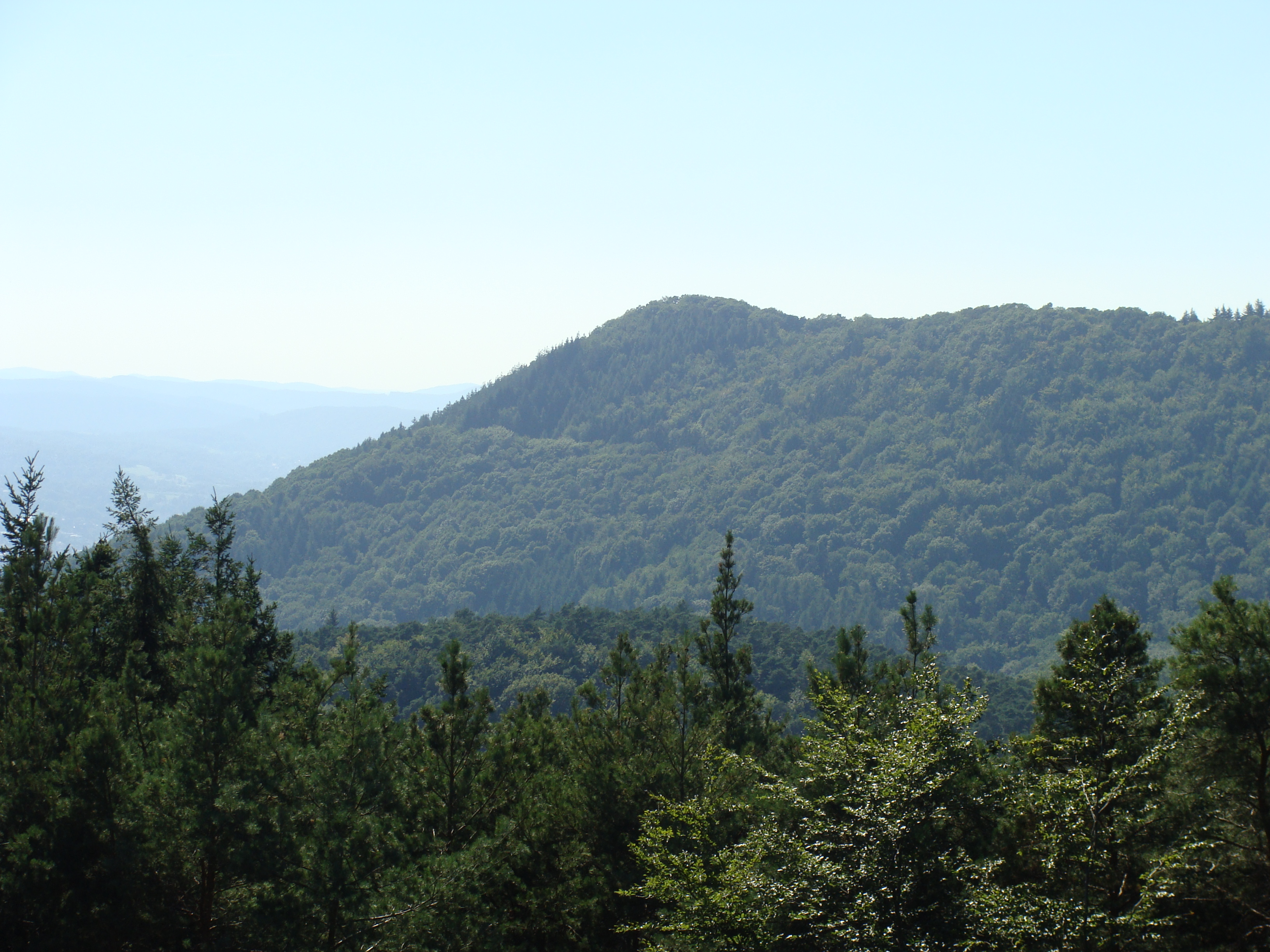
- The Orensberg

Highest point
- Elevation: 581.2 m above sea level (NHN) (1,907 ft)
- Coordinates: 49°13′48″N 8°01′39″E

Geography
- Location within Rhineland-Palatinate
- Location: near Frankweiler; Südliche Weinstraße, Rhineland-Palatinate Germany
- Parent range: Haardt (Palatine Forest)

Geology
- Rock type: Bunter sandstone

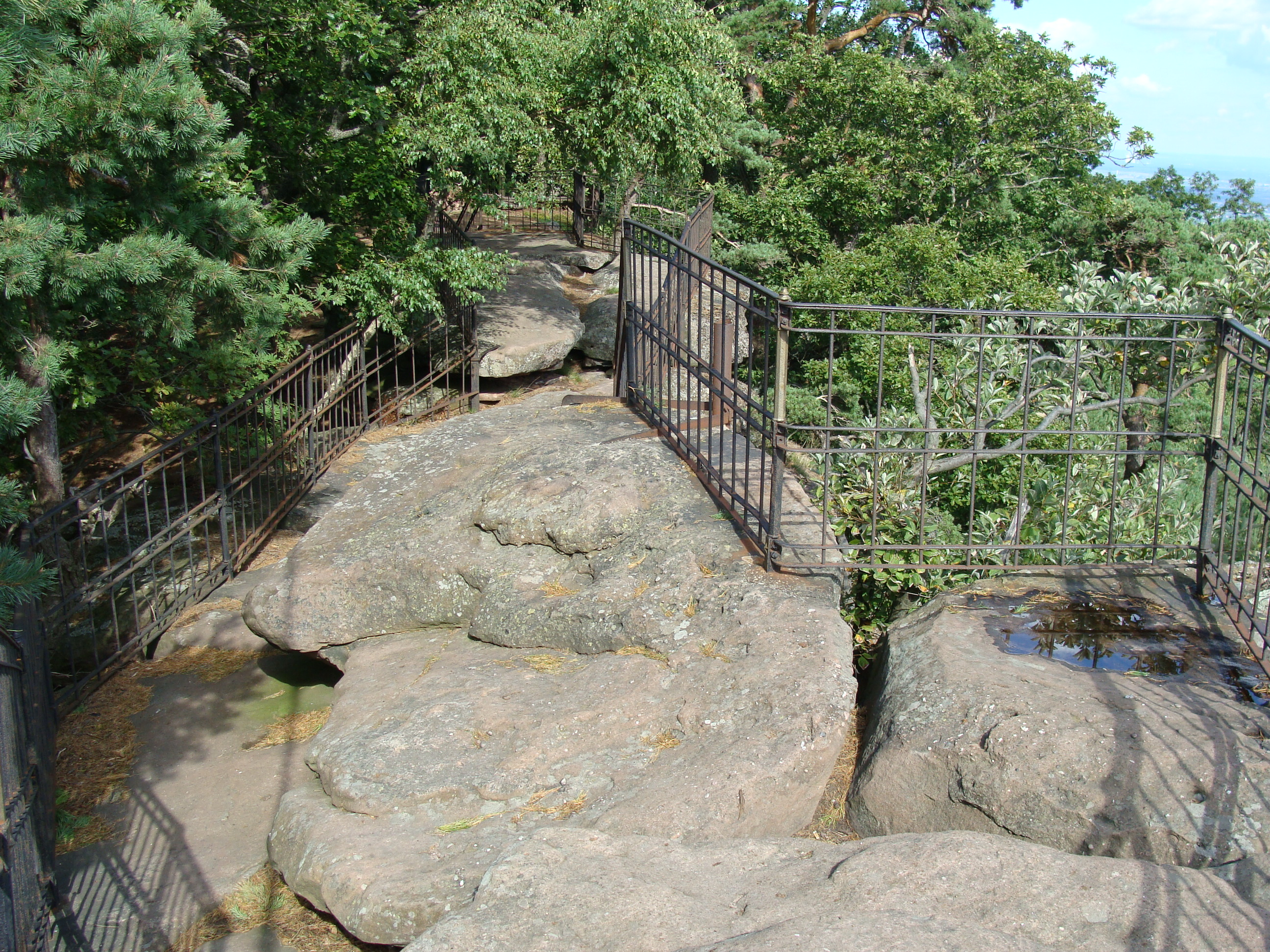
The Orensfelsen rocks: lookout platform

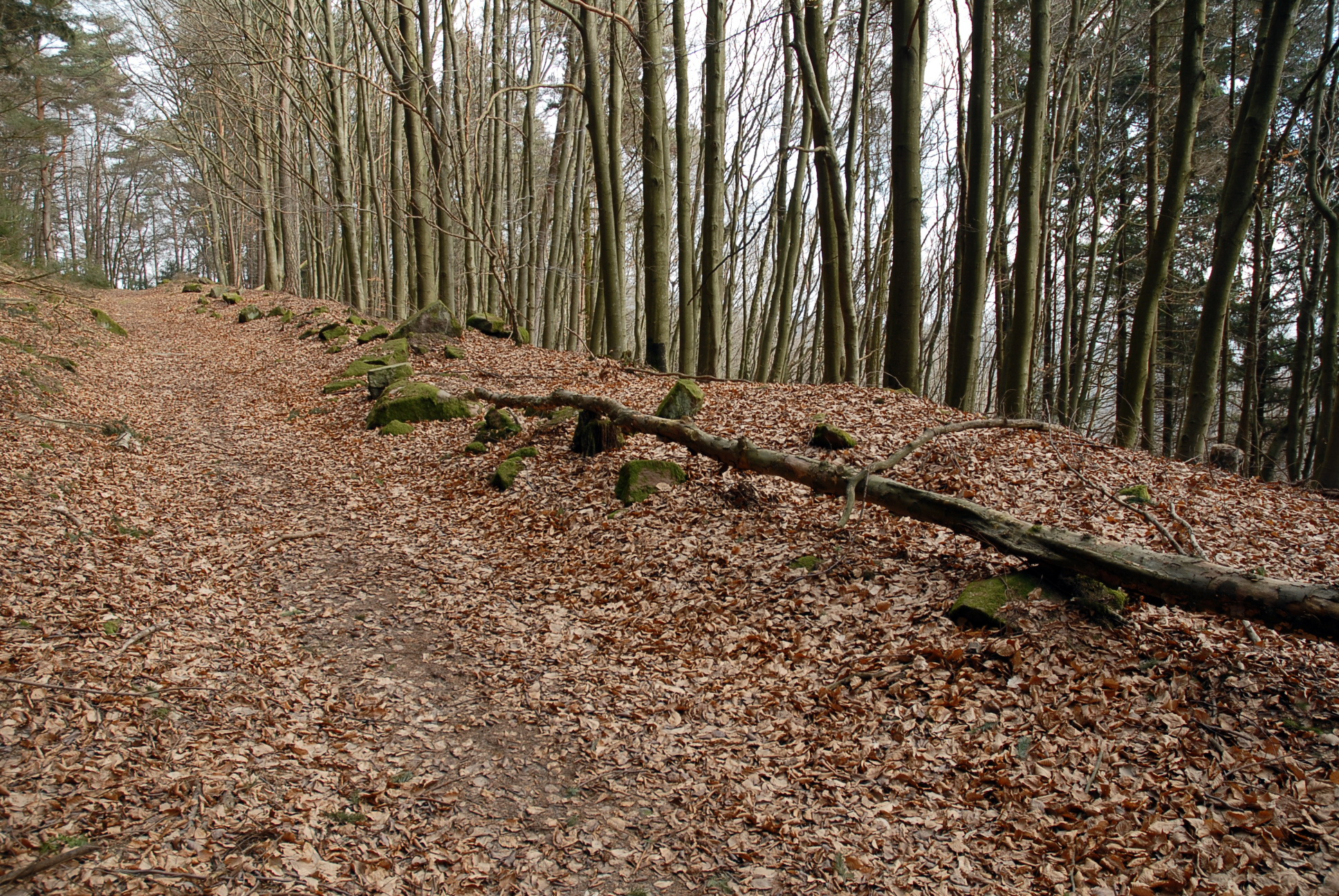
Remains of the circular rampart

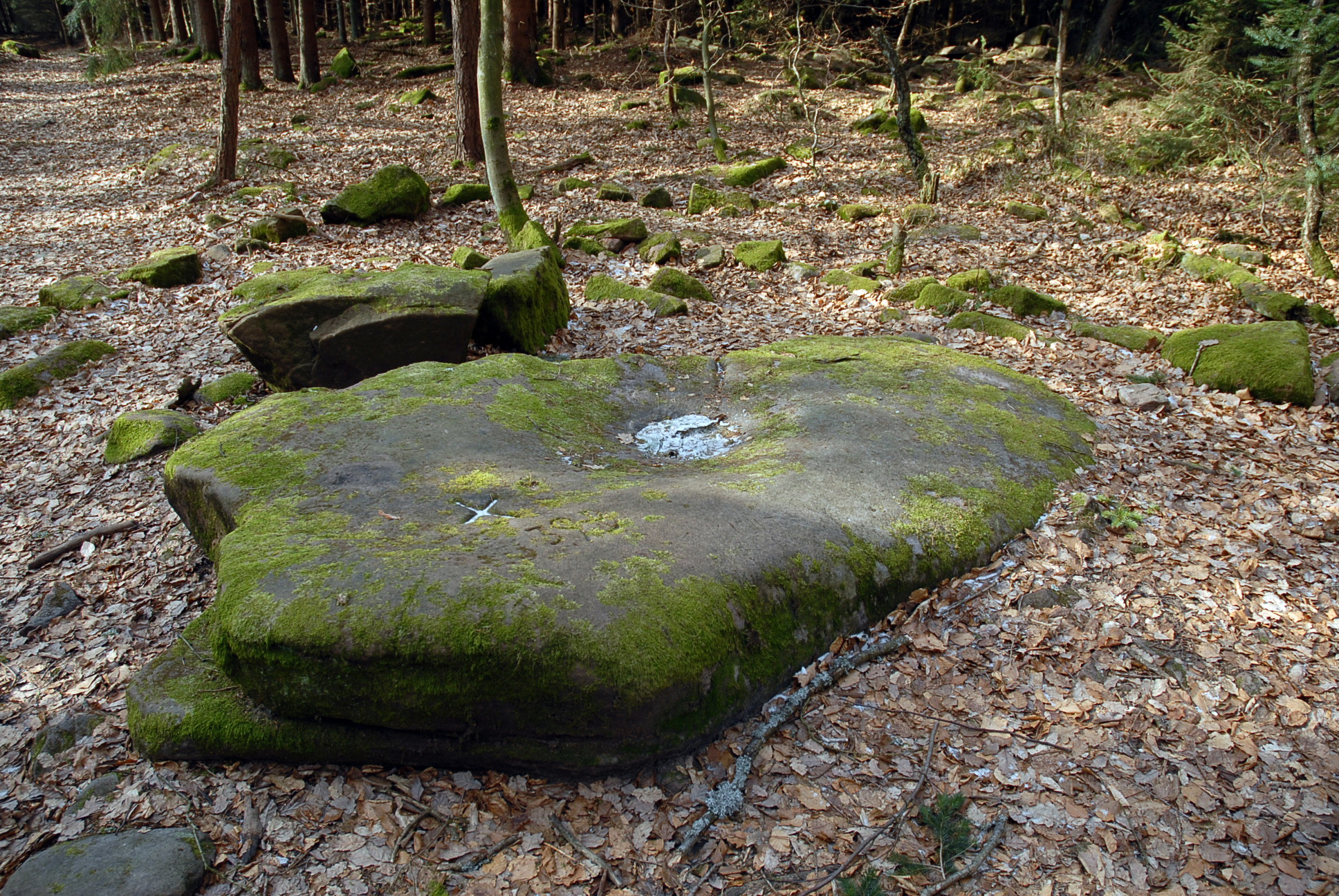
The Opferschale

The Orensberg, also known in the region as the Orensfels(en) due to the striking rock formations on its summit plateau, is a hill, 581.2 m above sea level (NHN), near Frankweiler in the county of Südliche Weinstraße in the German state of Rhineland-Palatinate. The hill is part of the Haardt mountain range that forms the eastern edge of the Palatinate Forest.

At the summit is an ancient circular rampart, now designated as a cultural monument, and the natural monument of the Orensfelsen rocks.

== Geographical Location ==
The summit of the Orensberg, which lies within the Palatine Forest Nature Park, rises within the forest estate belonging to Frankweiler, a village 2.8 kilometres to the southeast; the northern slopes of the hill are part of the woods of Böchingen, a settlement 4.7 km east-southeast. Higher mountains and hills nearby include the Roßberg (637.0 m), 2 km north, and the Teufelsberg (597.6 m), 2.1 km (both as the crow flies) northeast. Three streams flow past the Orensberg: the Dernbach to the west, the Queich to the south and the Hainbach to the east.

== History ==
=== Name ===
The Orensberg used to be called the Urlesberg. This was derived from the Old High German word Urlaß, which means "pasture hill" (Weideberg.
see also Urnsburg

=== Excavations ===
The remains of settlements from the Early Middle Ages have been found on the Orensberg. As a result, archaeological investigations have taken place for a number of years under the direction of Jochen Braselmann. Trial digs were carried out and several working ditches, so-called mardelles, were opened. Finds included flint arrowheads dating to the New Stone Age, as well as pottery from the Early Middle Ages. In addition the former entrance in the interior of the circular rampart was uncovered.

=== Circular rampart or ringwork ===
Today little can be seen of the collapsed stone wall that once formed the circular rampart. The rampart is around two and a half kilometres long and encloses an area of about 15 hectares. Early scientific assessments indicated it might be of Celtic origin and it was dated to the period around 500 B. C. In the meantime, it has been shown that it is actually the remains of a Carolingian refuge castle, which was built in the 8th century A.D. This evidence came from a dendrochronological investigation of a piece of an excavated wooden beam.

=== Opferschale ===
The so-called Opferschale ("sacrifice or offering bowl") on one of the rocks is a hollow in the Bunter sandstone, that has been formed by the erosion of rock layers (Karlstal beds, upper rock zone with ball rock horizon) of differing hardness and which bears traces of human activity. This type of feature is common in the Palatine Forest and is locally called a Wasserstein ("water rock") or Suppenschüssel ("soup bowl"). According to more recent research only the so-called "blood channel" (Blutrinne) has been added by human hands. It is not possible to date the workings, but they have been classified to the Celtic period.

== Sights ==
The summit plateau, whose highest point is protected by railings, offers a good all-round view of the Palatine Forest and the Upper Rhine Plain to the south. The surrounding area is rich in castles and castle ruins. For example, to the southwest may be seen the imperial castle of Trifels and its two sister fortresses, Anebos and Scharfenberg; on the north slope of the Orensberge is Scharfeneck Castle, behind the Roßberg mountain is Meistersel Castle, and to the northwest is the castle of Ramburg.

== Tourism and sport ==
Thanks to its views, the Orensberg is a popular destination for ramblers. It is accessible via a dense network of paths and the route to the top is signed. In addition the hill is a take-off point for paragliders and a destination for mountain bikers.
