= Hainbach (Speyerbach) =

River in Germany

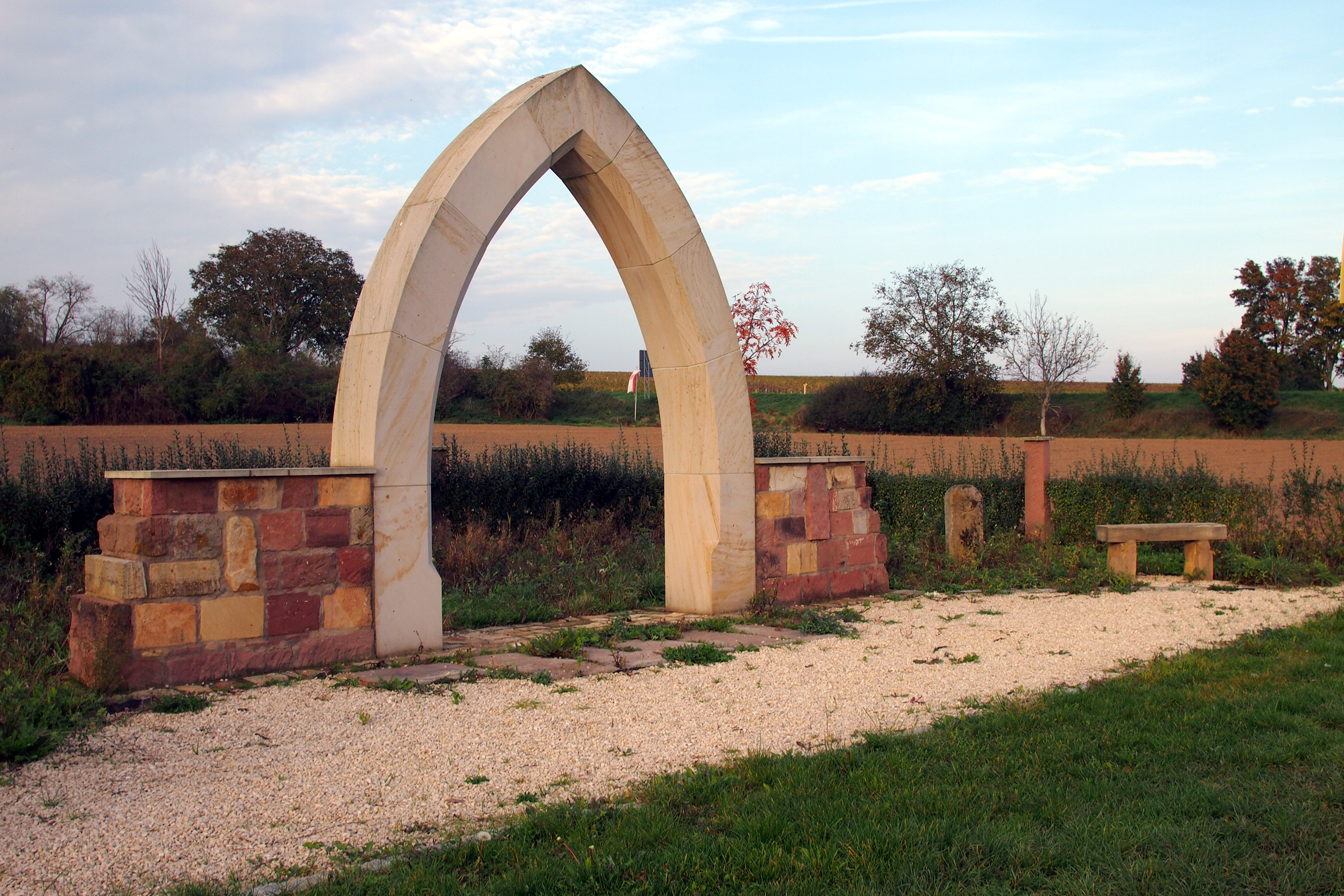
- Monument to the commandry at Hainbach near Zeiskam

Location
- Country: Germany
- State: Rhineland-Palatinate
- Reference no.: DE: 2378964

Physical characteristics
- Source
  - location: On the east flank of the Roßberg in the Haardt Mountains (eastern edge of the Palatine Forest)
  - coordinates: 49°15′30″N 8°02′28″E
  - elevation: ca. 400 m above sea level (NN)
- Mouth
  - location: on the northeastern edge of Dudenhofen into the Woogbach, a side arm of the Speyerbach
  - coordinates: 49°19′06″N 8°23′36″E
  - elevation: ca. 101 m above sea level (NN)
- Length: 33.6 km
- Basin size: 53.9 km²

Basin features
- Progression: Speyerbach→ Rhine→ North Sea

The Hainbach, historically also called the Heimbach (see History section), in its lower reaches also called the Wooggraben and Krebsbächel, is a river, over 33 kilometres long, and a right tributary of the Speyerbach in the German state of Rhineland-Palatinate.

In the Middle Ages there was a fortified abbey by the middle reaches of the river which belonged to a Roman Catholic religious order and acted as the regional administrative centre or commandry.

== Course ==
The Hainbach rises at a height of 400 m on the east flank of the Roßberg mountain (637.0 m) in the Haardt, the eastern edge of the Palatinate Forest range. It flows around the Teufelsberg (597.6 m), initially heading west and then south. After four kilometres it leaves the mountains between Frankweiler and Gleisweiler, passes through the narrow hill zone of the rift valley and enters the Upper Rhine Plain. Running initially eastwards, later northeastwards, it passes through Böchingen, Walsheim, Knöringen, Essingen and, on the southern edge of the Gäu region, the municipality of Hochstadt, the parishes of Zeiskam and Lustadt and the municipality of Weingarten.

In Schwegenheim it turns northwards; from Harthausen it is called the Wooggraben and changes direction to head east. On the southwestern edge of Dudenhofen it is led under the Speyerbach (carried on an embankment) through a culvert, passing the village as the Krebsbächel in a largely canalised riverbed and discharges on the northeastern edge of Dudenhofen (elevation 101 m) from the right into the Woogbach, also called the Nonnenbach which is a left side arm of the Speyerbach.

== History ==
In 1185 Emperor Frederick Barbarossa awarded extensive estates on the territory of Zeiskam north of the village on the Hainbach to the Knights Hospitaller. The order, whose Catholic successors after the Reformation period were called the Knights of Malta, founded a regional administrative centre, the Komturei of Heimbach, and named it after the stream, whose name was then spelt with an m. In 1525, during the Peasants' War the entire site including its church was burned down by rebellious farmers of the Nußdorf Haufen and permanently destroyed. In 2011 the municipality of Zeiskam inaugurated a monument near the few visible remains of the abbey, in the form of a Gothic sandstone arch.

== See also ==
- List of rivers of Rhineland-Palatinate
