= Hohenberg (Wasgau) =

Hill in the Wasgau hill range in the Palatinate Forest, Germany

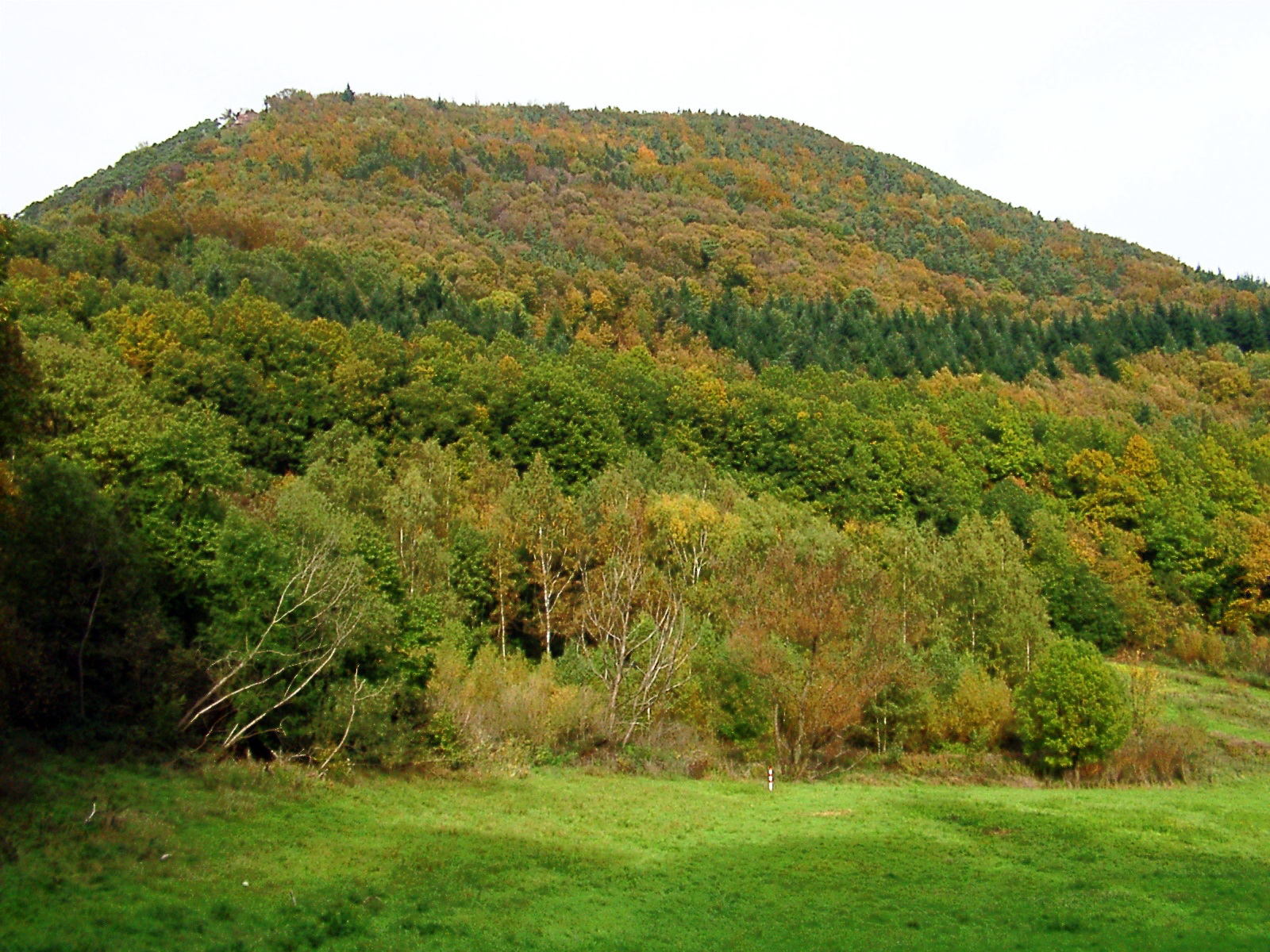
- The Hohenberg

Highest point
- Elevation: 552 m above sea level (NN) (1,811 ft)
- Coordinates: 49°12′11″N 8°00′19″E

Geography
- Location within Rhineland-Palatinate
- Location: Palatine Forest, Rhineland-Palatinate, Germany
- Parent range: Wasgau

Geology
- Rock type: Bunter Sandstone

The Hohenberg is a 552 m above sea level (NN) high hill in the Palatinate Forest, in the municipalities of Birkweiler, Queichhambach and Siebeldingen. At its summit is an observation tower, a refuge hut and starting ramps for hang gliders.

== Observation tower ==
On the site of the present-day observation tower a telegraph station was erected during the French Revolution in 1794, one of a chain of such stations from Paris via Metz to Landau. The station was abandoned following the transfer of Electoral Palatinate to Bavaria in May 1816.

From August to September 1879 an observation tower, just under 9 metres high, was erected at the summit by the conservation societies of Annweiler and Landau. It was built as a cone-shaped pyramid using dry mortarless construction. The core of the tower was mostly made of rubble. A staircase led up the western side of the tower to the viewing platform on the top. In the 1960s the first stones worked loose as a result of age and in 1970 the eastern side of the tower collapsed. In 1971, DM 30,000 was invested in the building of an access track for motor vehicles and the rebuilding of the tower.

In 2002 the observation tower collapsed again. A construction site fence prevents access to the tower remains. Restoration costs are estimated at € 120,000. The municipality is trying to obtain EU funding.

== Sport ==
At the western end of the summit are the Schumacher rocks. Two starting ramps for hang gliders have been built here. From the rocks there are clear views of the three castles of Trifels, Anebos and Scharfenberg.

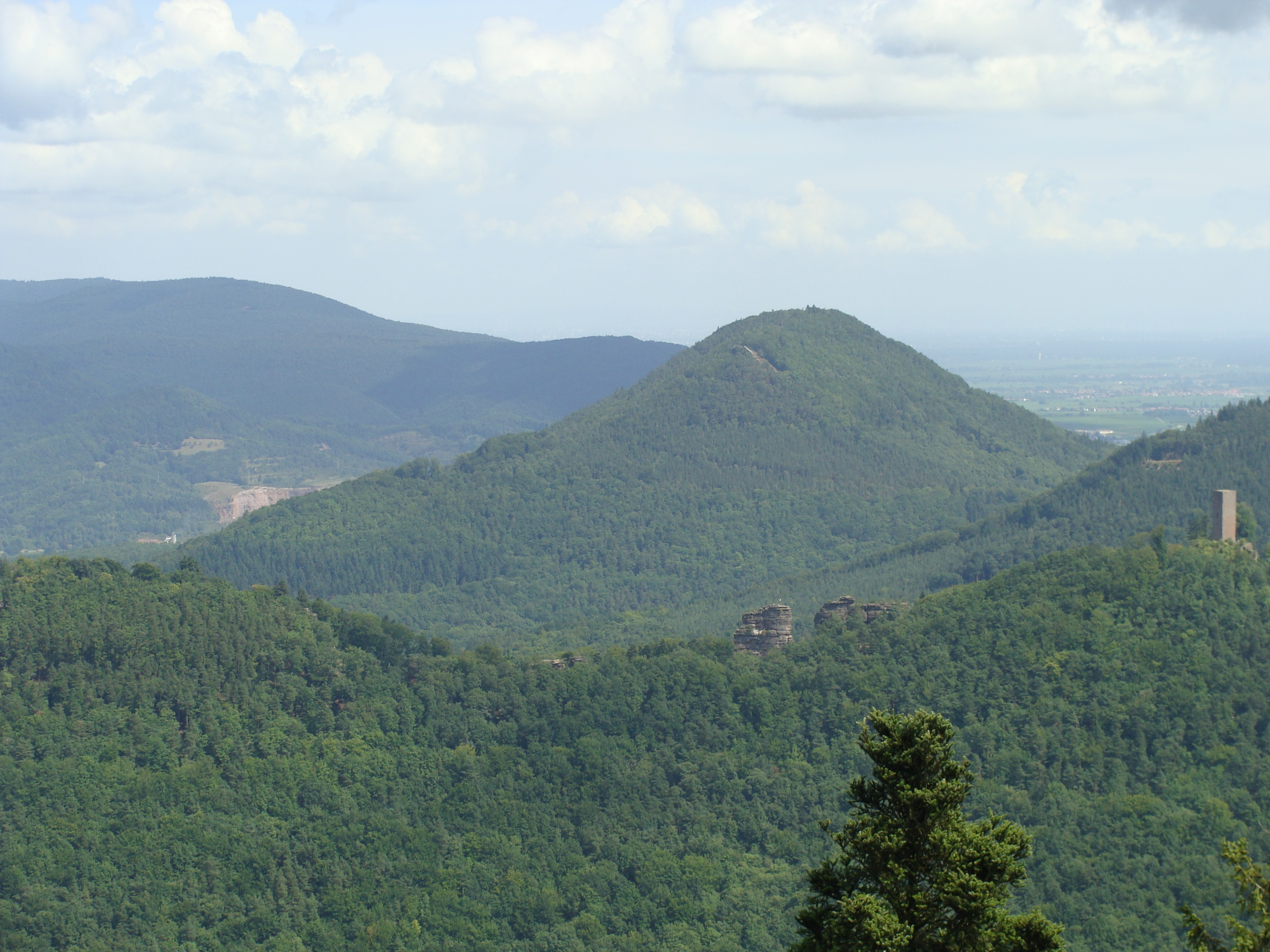
The Hohenberg seen from the Rehberg Tower

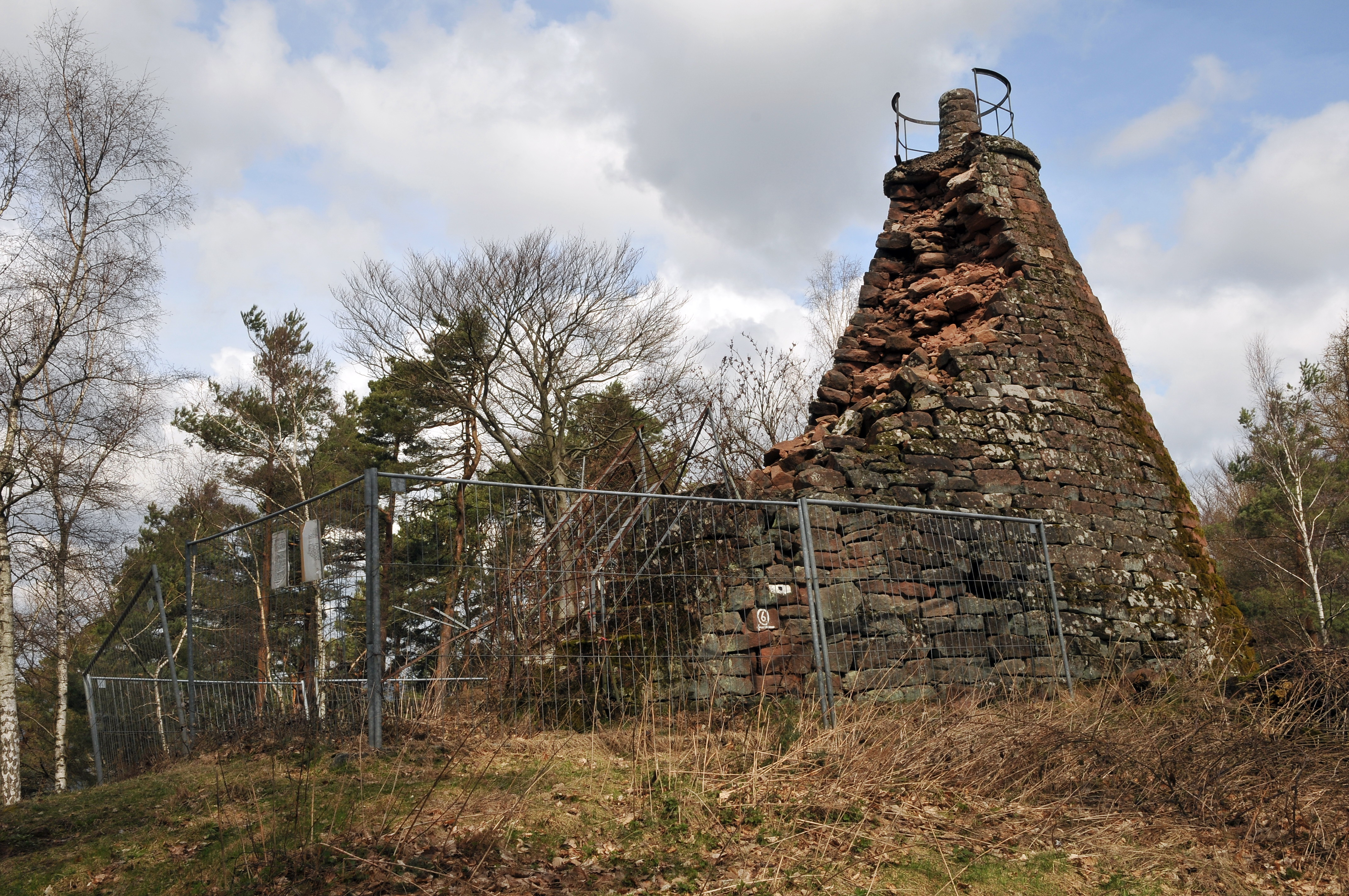
The collapsed viewing tower on the Hohenberg
