= Conrad III of Scharfenberg =

German cleric

- Born: 1165
- Died: 24 March 1224 (aged 58–59)
- Citizenship: Germany

Conrad of Scharfenberg (German: Konrad von Scharfenberg; c. 1165 – 24 March 1224) was a German cleric who became bishop of Speyer (1200–1224, as Conrad III) and later, simultaneously, bishop of Metz (1212–1224). He came from a family of knights who served the Holy Roman Empire from the area around Trifels Castle. His family castle was Scharfenburg (today Burg Münz).

== Early life ==
Conrad was raised and educated at the cathedral school in Speyer. In 1187 he entered royal service during the reign of Frederick I, Holy Roman Emperor. Altogether, he served four emperors and kings in the imperial chancellery, where he made his career in both the worldly and the spiritual.

First he was the provost of Saint Germain in Speyer. In 1198 he became Dekan of the chapter there. He became a follower of the Staufer Philip of Swabia during the struggle for the throne between the House Hohenstaufen and the House of Welf, which broke out after the death of Henry VI, Holy Roman Emperor.

== Bishop of Speyer ==
In 1200, Conrad was named Bishop of Speyer and master of the imperial cathedral. In 1208 he was named chancellor, although this office was normally filled by the archbishop of Mainz in the Holy Roman Empire. After the murder of King Philip (which had nothing to do with the struggle for the throne) in 1208, Conrad managed the imperial insignia.

When the Welf king Otto IV was generally recognized, Conrad served him and accompanied him to Rome for his crowning by Pope Innocent III.

== Bishop of Metz ==
In 1212, Conrad was elected bishop of Metz despite the competition from the bishop of Langres, Guillaume de Joinville, who was the candidate of the French king Philip Augustus.

In 1220 he accompanied the Staufer king Frederick II to Rome for his crowning by pope Honorius III. On his journey he learned of the new religious orders, the Dominican Order and the Franciscan Order. This opened the way into Germany for these orders.

== Final years ==
In the last years of his life, Conrad dedicated himself exclusively to his two Diocese, and foremost to the bishopric of Speyer and his cathedral. There he laid the legs of Philip of Swabia to rest. He also arranged for the reconstruction of the Metz Cathedral.

Conrad died on 24 March 1224 and his final resting place is next to King Philip in the Speyer Cathedral.

Preceded by Bertram of Metz	Bishop of Metz; 1212–1224	Succeeded by Johann I of Aspremont
Preceded by Otto II, Count of Henneberg	Bishop of Speyer; 1200–1224	Succeeded by Beringer of Entringen
