= Barbatia gens =

Ancient Roman family

The gens Barbatia was a minor plebeian family at Ancient Rome. The only member of this gens mentioned in history is Marcus Barbatius Philippus, a runaway slave who became a friend of Caesar, and subsequently obtained the praetorship under Marcus Antonius. Others are known from inscriptions.

== Origin ==
The nomen Barbatius belongs to a class of gentilicia formed from cognomina ending in -atus. The surname Barbatus, from which the nomen is derived, originally referred to someone with a beard.

== Praenomina ==
The Barbatii used several common praenomina, of which the most frequent was Marcus. Other Barbatii were named Lucius, Publius, Quintus, and Titus.

== Members ==
- Publius Barbatius M. l., a freedman named in an inscription from Rome, dating from the early first century BC.
- Publius Barbatius L. l. Philotaerus, a freedman buried at Canusium in Apulia, in a tomb dating from the latter half of the first century BC, or the first quarter of the first century AD.
- Marcus Barbatius Philippus, a runaway slave, befriended Caesar, and later Antony, under whom he served as quaestor pro praetore in 40 BC. Ulpian relates an anecdote, recorded in the Suda, in which he was recognized by his former master while performing his magisterial duties, but was able to purchase his freedom.
- Marcus Barbatius Pollio, one of the curule aediles at Rome in an uncertain year during the late first century BC, restored the rites of Juturna.
- Marcus Barbatius M. f. Celer, had been aedile, praefectus jure dicundo, and duumvir, according to an inscription from Corinth, dating from the late first century BC, or the first half of the first century AD.
- Barbatia, a freedwoman, dedicated a tomb at Aufinum in Samnium, dating from the Julio-Claudian dynasty for her husband, the freedman Titus Sulfius Protus.
- Marcus Barbatius Epaphroditus, a potter active at the beginning of the first century AD. His maker's mark has been found on works from Latium and Campania.
- Quintus Barbatius Ɔ. l. Zeno, a fredman buried at Rome, in a tomb dating from the first half of the first century.
- Marcus Barbatius Celer, mentioned in an inscription from Pompeii in Campania, dating from AD 38.
- Barbatia Felicula, buried at Puteoli in Campania, aged thirty-five, in a tomb dating from the early or middle part of the first century.
- Titus Barbatius Placidus, built a sepulchre at Emerita in Lusitania, dating from the latter half of the first century, for himself, his wife, and their family, including daughter Barbatia Placida, and freedwoman Barbatia Quarta.
- Barbatia T. f. Placida, the young daughter of Titus Barbatius Placidus, buried at Emerita, aged four years, three months, in a family sepulchre dating from the latter half of the first century.
- Barbatia T. l. Quarta, the freedwoman of Titus Barbatius Placidus, buried in the family sepulchre at Emerita, dating from the latter half of the first century, aged thirty-seven.
- Barbatius Hyginus, buried at Pola in Venetia and Histria, in a tomb dedicated by his client, the freedwoman Barbatia Anthemis, dating between the latter half of the second and the end of the third century.
- Barbatia Anthemis, a freedwoman, dedicated a second- or third-century tomb at Pola for her patron Barbatius Hyginus.
- Barbatius Silvester, a municipal decurion buried at the present site of Walsheim, formerly part of Germania Superior, in a tomb dedicated by his sons, Arbirius, Silvanus, and Silvio Severo, and his grandson, Rusticius, dating between the late second century and the end of the third.

=== Undated Barbatii ===
- Barbatia, buried at Tunes in Africa Proconsularis.
- Barbatia T. l. Optata, a freedwoman buried at Emerita.
- Marcus Barbatius M. l. Pandarus, a freedman buried at Caesarea in Mauretania Caesariensis.
- Marcus Barbatius Titullus, buried at Rome, in a tomb dedicated by his sister, Octavia.

== See also ==
- List of Roman gentes

== Bibliography ==
- Marcus Tullius Cicero, Philippicae.
- Appianus Alexandrinus (Appian), Bellum Civile (The Civil War).
- Digesta, or Pandectae (The Digest).
- Suda.
- Dictionary of Greek and Roman Biography and Mythology, William Smith, ed., Little, Brown and Company, Boston (1849).
- Theodor Mommsen et alii, Corpus Inscriptionum Latinarum (The Body of Latin Inscriptions, abbreviated CIL), Berlin-Brandenburgische Akademie der Wissenschaften (1853–present).
- Bullettino della Commissione Archeologica Comunale in Roma (Bulletin of the Municipal Archaeological Commission of Rome, abbreviated BCAR), (1872–present).
- Bulletin Archéologique du Comité des Travaux Historiques et Scientifiques (Archaeological Bulletin of the Committee on Historic and Scientific Works, abbreviated BCTH), Imprimerie Nationale, Paris (1885–1973).
- René Cagnat et alii, L'Année épigraphique (The Year in Epigraphy, abbreviated AE), Presses Universitaires de France (1888–present).
- George Davis Chase, "The Origin of Roman Praenomina", in Harvard Studies in Classical Philology, vol. VIII, pp. 103–184 (1897).
- Corinth: Results of the excavations conducted by the American School of Classical Studies at Athens, vol. VIII, part 2: Latin Inscriptions (1896–1926), A.B. West, ed., Harvard University Press, Cambridge, Massachusetts (1931).
- Luis García Iglesias, Epigrafía Romana de Augusta Emerita (Roman Epigraphy of Augusta Emerita), Madrid (1973).
