= Birkweiler =

- Municipality
- Coat of arms

- Location of Birkweiler within Südliche Weinstraße district
- Interactive map of Birkweiler
- Location within Germany Location within Rhineland-Palatinate
- Coordinates: 49°12′21″N 8°02′11″E
- Country: Germany
- State: Rhineland-Palatinate
- District: Südliche Weinstraße
- Municipal assoc.: Landau-Land

Government
  - Mayor (2019–24): Bernd Flaxmeyer

Area
  - Total: 4.94 km^{2} (1.91 sq mi)
- Elevation: 189 m (620 ft)

Population (2025-12-31)
  - Total: 721
  - Density: 146/km^{2} (378/sq mi)
- Time zone: UTC+01:00 (CET)
  - Summer (DST): UTC+02:00 (CEST)
- Postal codes: 76831
- Dialling codes: 06345
- Vehicle registration: SÜW
- Website: www.birkweiler.de

Birkweiler (German pronunciation: [ˈbɪʁkvaɪlɐ]) is a municipality in the Südliche Weinstraße district, in Rhineland-Palatinate, Germany.

== Location ==
The municipality is a typical wine village on the German Wine Route in the Siebelding valley at the foot of the Hohenberg (556 m with an observation tower).

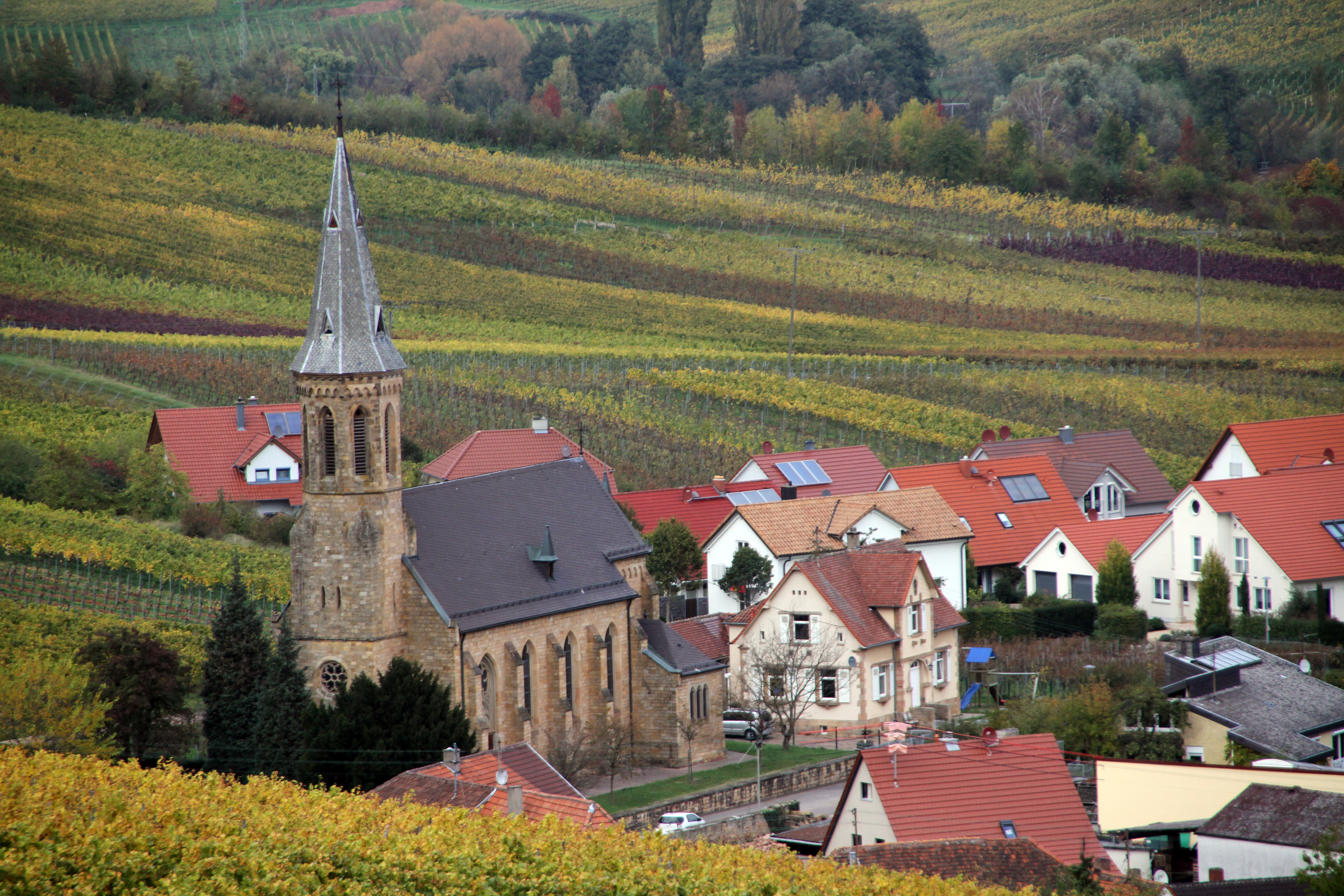
Catholic church of St. Bartholomäus
