= Ranschbach =

- Municipality
- Coat of arms

- Location of Ranschbach within Südliche Weinstraße district
- Interactive map of Ranschbach
- Location within Germany Location within Rhineland-Palatinate
- Coordinates: 49°11′45″N 8°01′57″E
- Country: Germany
- State: Rhineland-Palatinate
- District: Südliche Weinstraße
- Municipal assoc.: Landau-Land

Government
  - Mayor (2019–24): Thorsten Doll

Area
  - Total: 1.19 km^{2} (0.46 sq mi)
- Elevation: 246 m (807 ft)

Population (2025-12-31)
  - Total: 625
  - Density: 525/km^{2} (1,360/sq mi)
- Time zone: UTC+01:00 (CET)
  - Summer (DST): UTC+02:00 (CEST)
- Postal codes: 76829
- Dialling codes: 06345
- Vehicle registration: SÜW
- Website: www.ranschbach.de

Ranschbach (German pronunciation: [ˈʁanʃbax]) is a municipality in Südliche Weinstraße district, in Rhineland-Palatinate, western Germany.

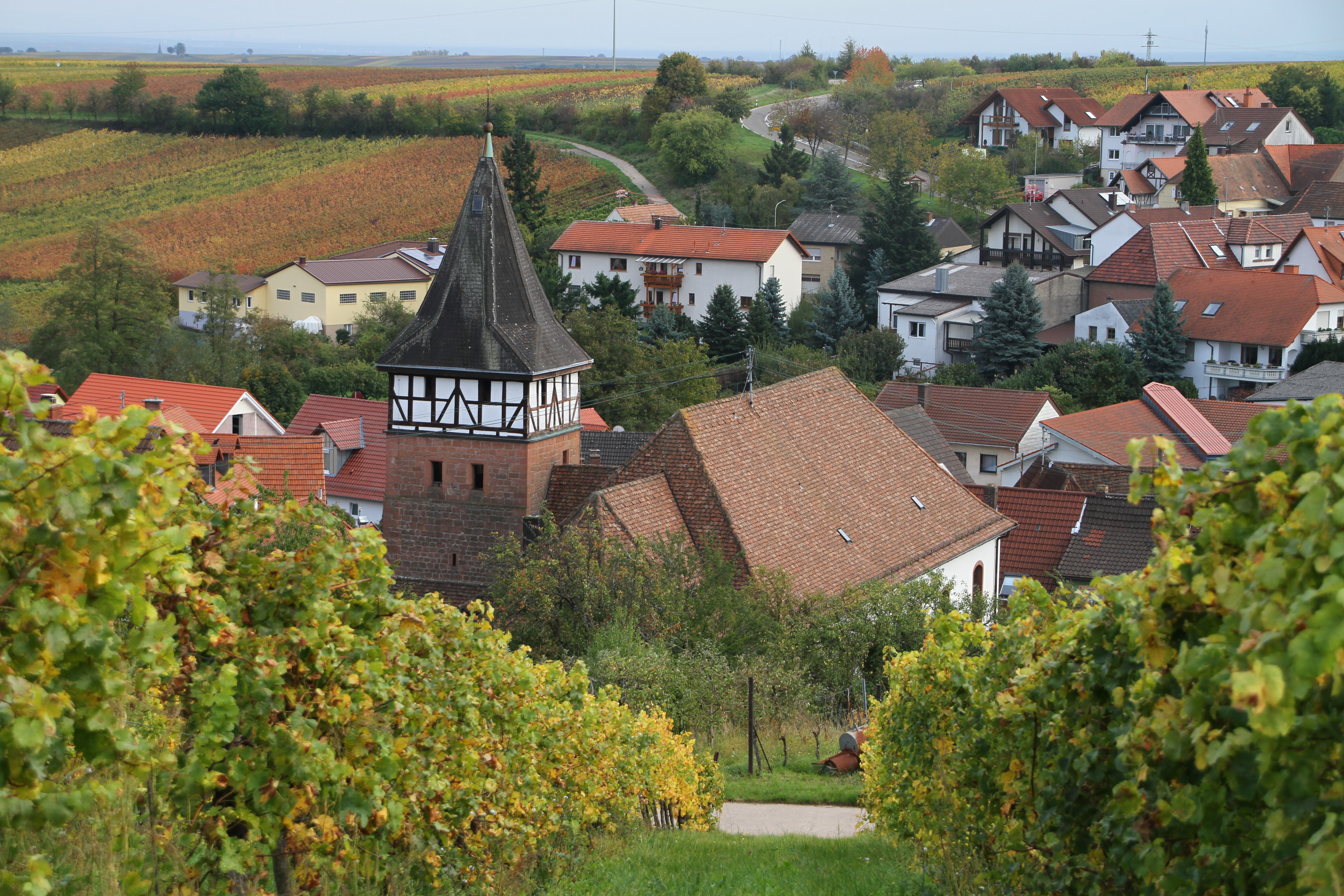
Catholic church of All Saints
