= Göcklingen =

- Municipality
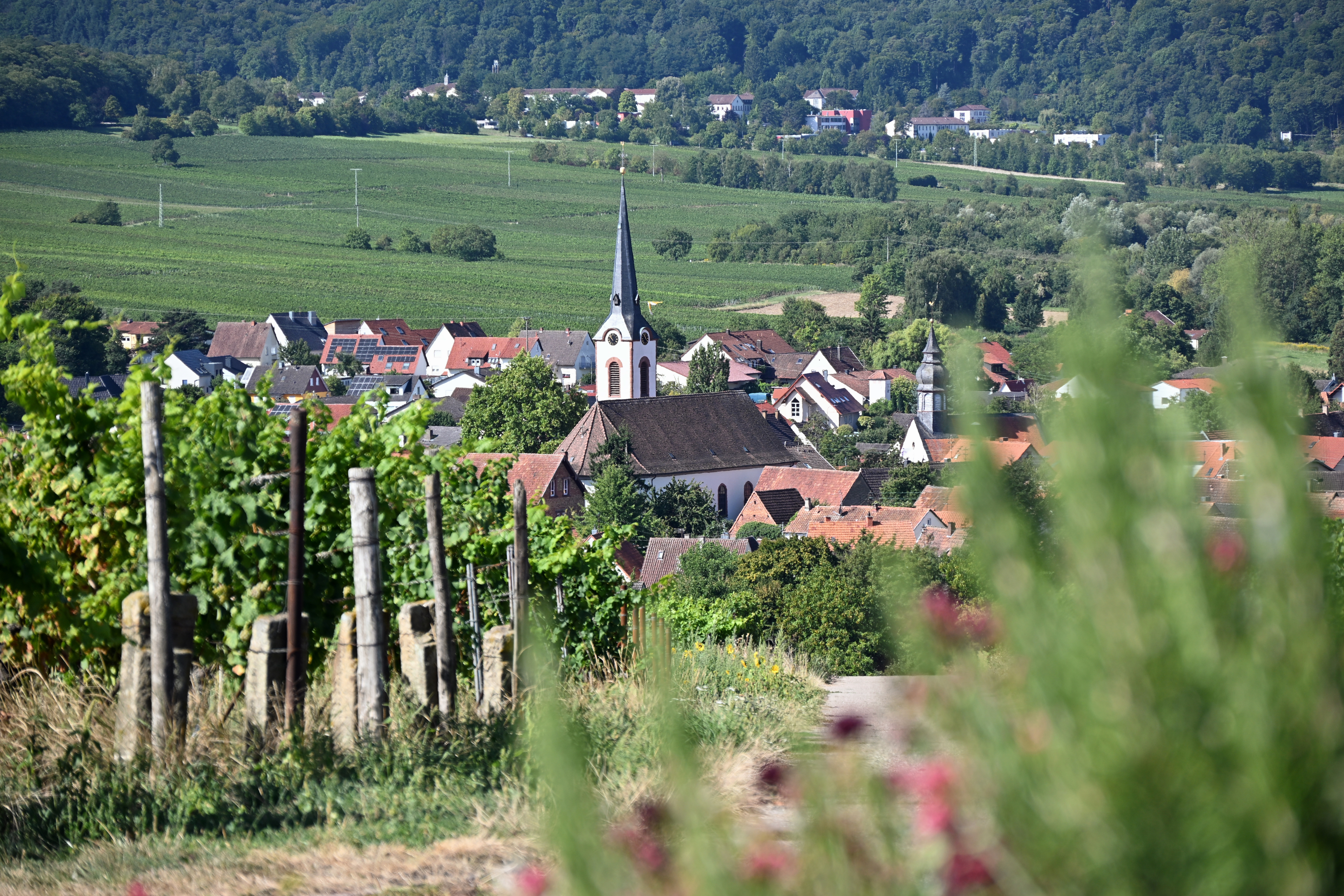

- Coat of arms

- Location of Göcklingen within Südliche Weinstraße district
- Interactive map of Göcklingen
- Location within Germany Location within Rhineland-Palatinate
- Coordinates: 49°9′45″N 8°2′29″E
- Country: Germany
- State: Rhineland-Palatinate
- District: Südliche Weinstraße
- Municipal assoc.: Landau-Land

Government
  - Mayor (2019–24): Manuela Laub

Area
  - Total: 7.27 km^{2} (2.81 sq mi)
- Elevation: 181 m (594 ft)

Population (2025-12-31)
  - Total: 868
  - Density: 119/km^{2} (309/sq mi)
- Time zone: UTC+01:00 (CET)
  - Summer (DST): UTC+02:00 (CEST)
- Postal codes: 76831
- Dialling codes: 06349
- Vehicle registration: SÜW
- Website: www.goecklingen.de

Göcklingen (German pronunciation: [ˈɡœklɪŋən]) is a municipality in Südliche Weinstraße district, in Rhineland-Palatinate, western Germany.
