= Landau-Land =

- Verbandsgemeinde
- Location of Landau-Land within Südliche Weinstraße district
- Interactive map of Landau-Land
- Location within Germany Location within Rhineland-Palatinate
- Coordinates: 49°12′N 8°07′E
- Country: Germany
- State: Rhineland-Palatinate
- District: Südliche Weinstraße
- Seat: Landau
- Subdivisions: 14 municipalities

Area
  - Total: 90.52 km^{2} (34.95 sq mi)

Population (2025-12-31)
  - Total: 14,007
  - Density: 154.7/km^{2} (400.8/sq mi)
- Time zone: UTC+01:00 (CET)
  - Summer (DST): UTC+02:00 (CEST)
- Website: www.landau-land.de

Landau-Land is a Verbandsgemeinde ("collective municipality") in the Südliche Weinstraße district, in Rhineland-Palatinate, Germany. It is situated on the eastern edge of the Palatinate Forest, around Landau. The seat of the municipality is in Landau, itself not part of the municipality.

The Verbandsgemeinde Landau-Land consists of the following Ortsgemeinden ("local municipalities"):

1. Billigheim-Ingenheim
2. Birkweiler
3. Böchingen
4. Eschbach
5. Frankweiler
6. Göcklingen
7. Heuchelheim-Klingen
8. Ilbesheim bei Landau in der Pfalz
9. Impflingen
10. Knöringen
11. Leinsweiler
12. Ranschbach
13. Siebeldingen
14. Walsheim
