= Heuchelheim-Klingen =

- Municipality
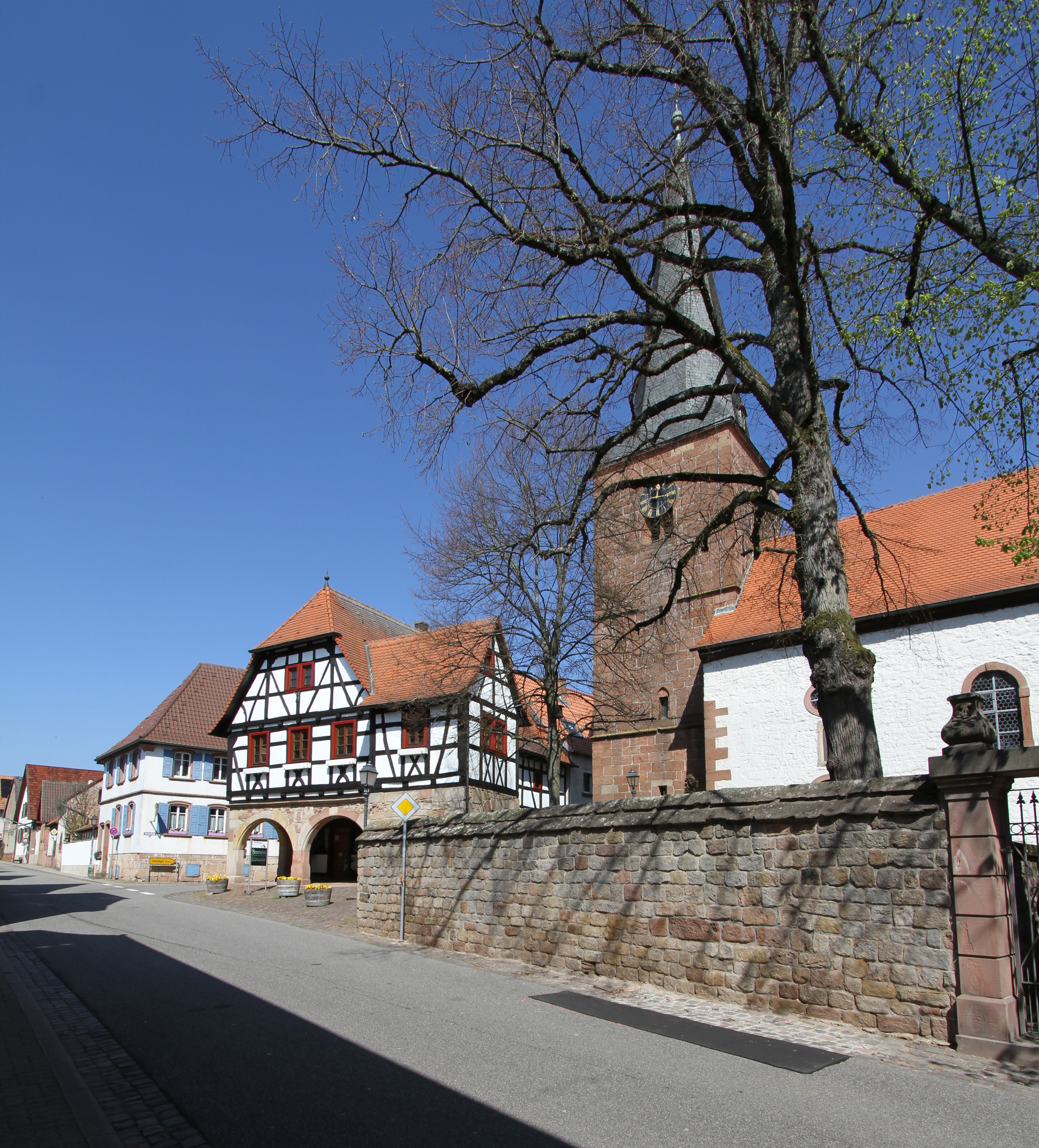

- Coat of arms

- Location of Heuchelheim-Klingen within Südliche Weinstraße district
- Interactive map of Heuchelheim-Klingen
- Location within Germany Location within Rhineland-Palatinate
- Coordinates: 49°08′48″N 8°03′14″E
- Country: Germany
- State: Rhineland-Palatinate
- District: Südliche Weinstraße
- Municipal assoc.: Landau-Land
- Subdivisions: 2

Government
  - Mayor (2019–24): Uwe Huth (FW)

Area
  - Total: 7.38 km^{2} (2.85 sq mi)
- Elevation: 172 m (564 ft)

Population (2025-12-31)
  - Total: 822
  - Density: 111/km^{2} (288/sq mi)
- Time zone: UTC+01:00 (CET)
  - Summer (DST): UTC+02:00 (CEST)
- Postal codes: 76831
- Dialling codes: 06349
- Vehicle registration: SÜW
- Website: www.klingbachtal.de

Heuchelheim-Klingen is a municipality in Südliche Weinstraße district, in Rhineland-Palatinate, western Germany.
