= Eschbach, Südliche Weinstraße =

Eschbach
- Municipality
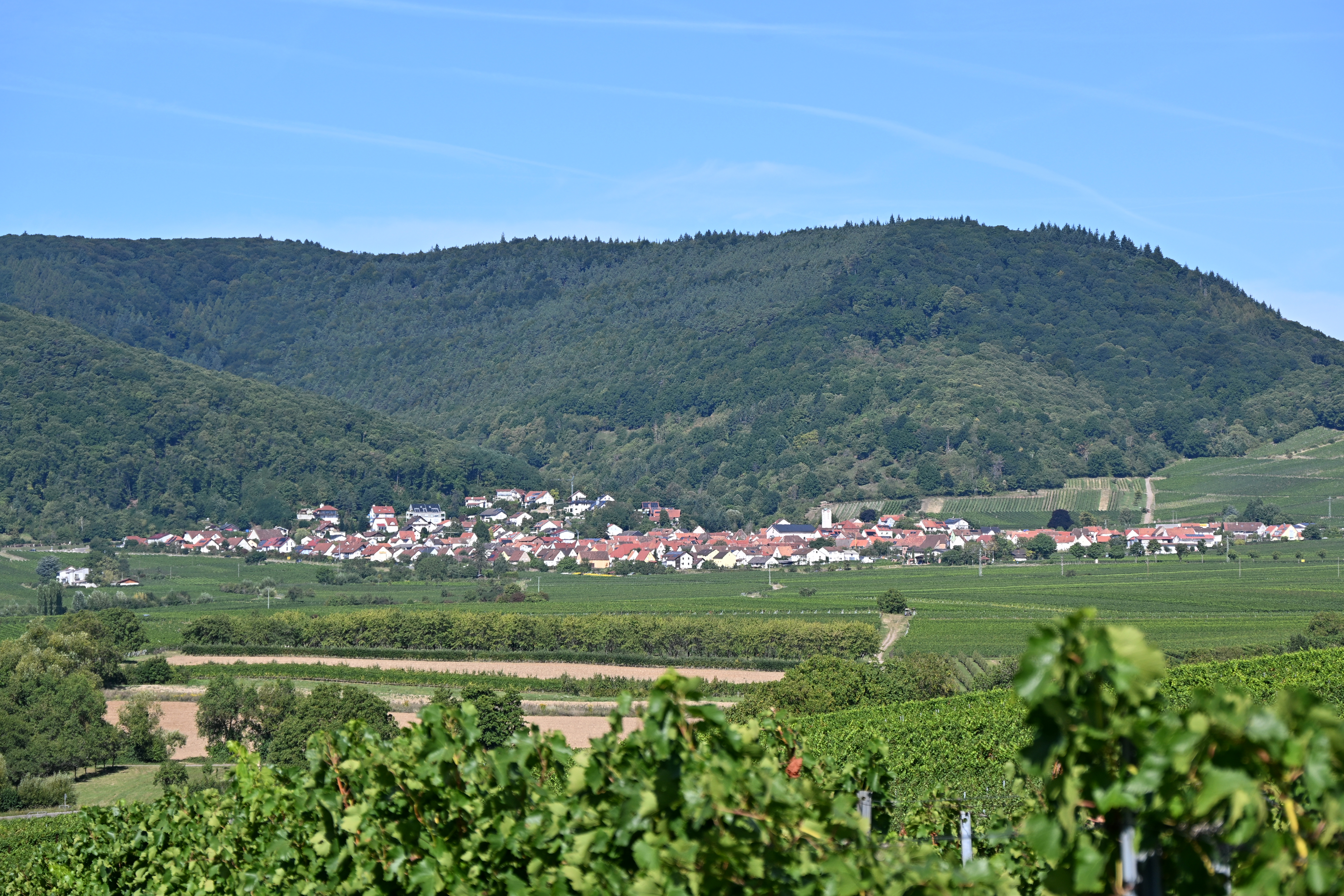

- Coat of arms

- Location of Eschbach within Südliche Weinstraße district
- Interactive map of Eschbach
- Location within Germany Location within Rhineland-Palatinate
- Coordinates: 49°10′30″N 8°1′14″E
- Country: Germany
- State: Rhineland-Palatinate
- District: Südliche Weinstraße
- Municipal assoc.: Landau-Land

Government
  - Mayor (2019–24): Frank Laux

Area
  - Total: 3.66 km^{2} (1.41 sq mi)
- Elevation: 231 m (758 ft)

Population (2025-12-31)
  - Total: 649
  - Density: 177/km^{2} (459/sq mi)
- Time zone: UTC+01:00 (CET)
  - Summer (DST): UTC+02:00 (CEST)
- Postal codes: 76831
- Dialling codes: 06341
- Vehicle registration: SÜW
- Website: www.eschbach-pfalz.de

Eschbach (German pronunciation: [ˈɛʃbax]) is a municipality in the Südliche Weinstraße district, in Rhineland-Palatinate, Germany.
