= Teufelsberg (Haardt) =

Hill massif in Südliche Weinstraße, Germany

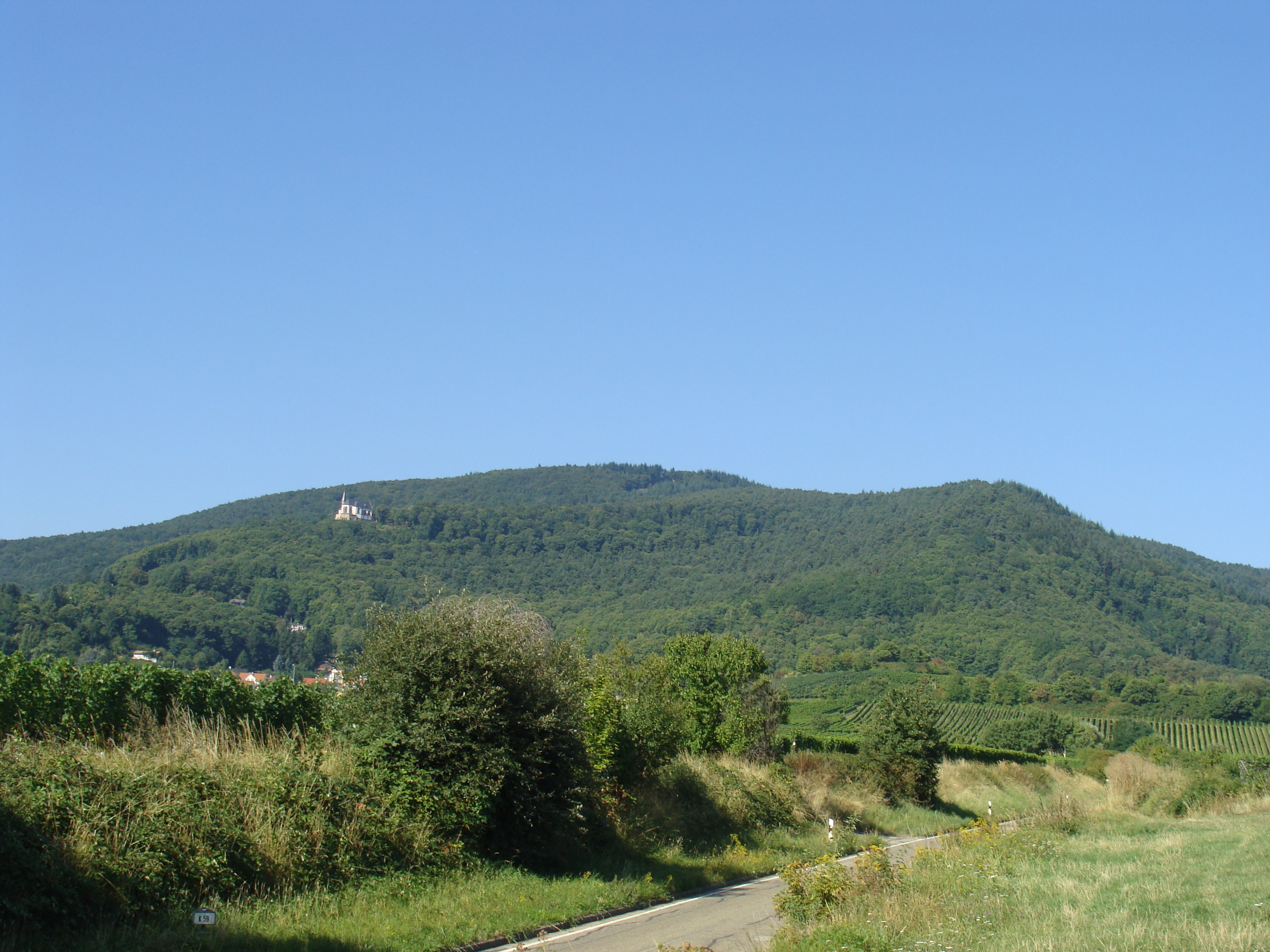
- The Teufelsberg and the Lambertskopf

Highest point
- Elevation: 598 m above sea level (NN) (1,962 ft)
- Coordinates: 49°15′10″N 8°03′17″E

Geography
- Location within Rhineland-Palatinate
- Location: Palatinate (Rhineland-Palatinate, Germany
- Parent range: Pfälzerwald

The Teufelsberg is a hill massif, 598 metres high, in the southern Palatinate Forest on the territory of Burrweiler in the county of Südliche Weinstraße. It has a subpeak, the Lambertskopf (539 m). The Teufelsberg offers extensive views over the Upper Rhine Plain. It is not accessible by motor vehicle but may be ascended on various hiking trails.

== Sights ==
=== Summit cross ===
At the highest point on the Teufelsberg, a rock massif, stands a stone weather cross on pyramidal, rough stone pedestal. It was carved by local sculptor, Johannes Minges, and consecrated on 25 July 1909 by the Bishop of Speyer, Konrad von Busch. Hence it bears the colloquial name of "Bishop's Cross" (Bischofskreuz). This is also the name of a vineyard in nearby Walsheim.

=== St. Anne's Chapel ===
On the eastern slopes of the Teufelsberg, between the summit and Burrweiler at a height of 423 metres, is the Roman Catholic St. Anne's Chapel (Annakapelle), which was built in the 19th century in the Gothic Revival style and to which there are regular pilgrimages in July and August. In addition the parishes of Burrweiler and Flemlingen make their covenant procession (Gelöbnisprozession) to the chapel every year on 1 May.

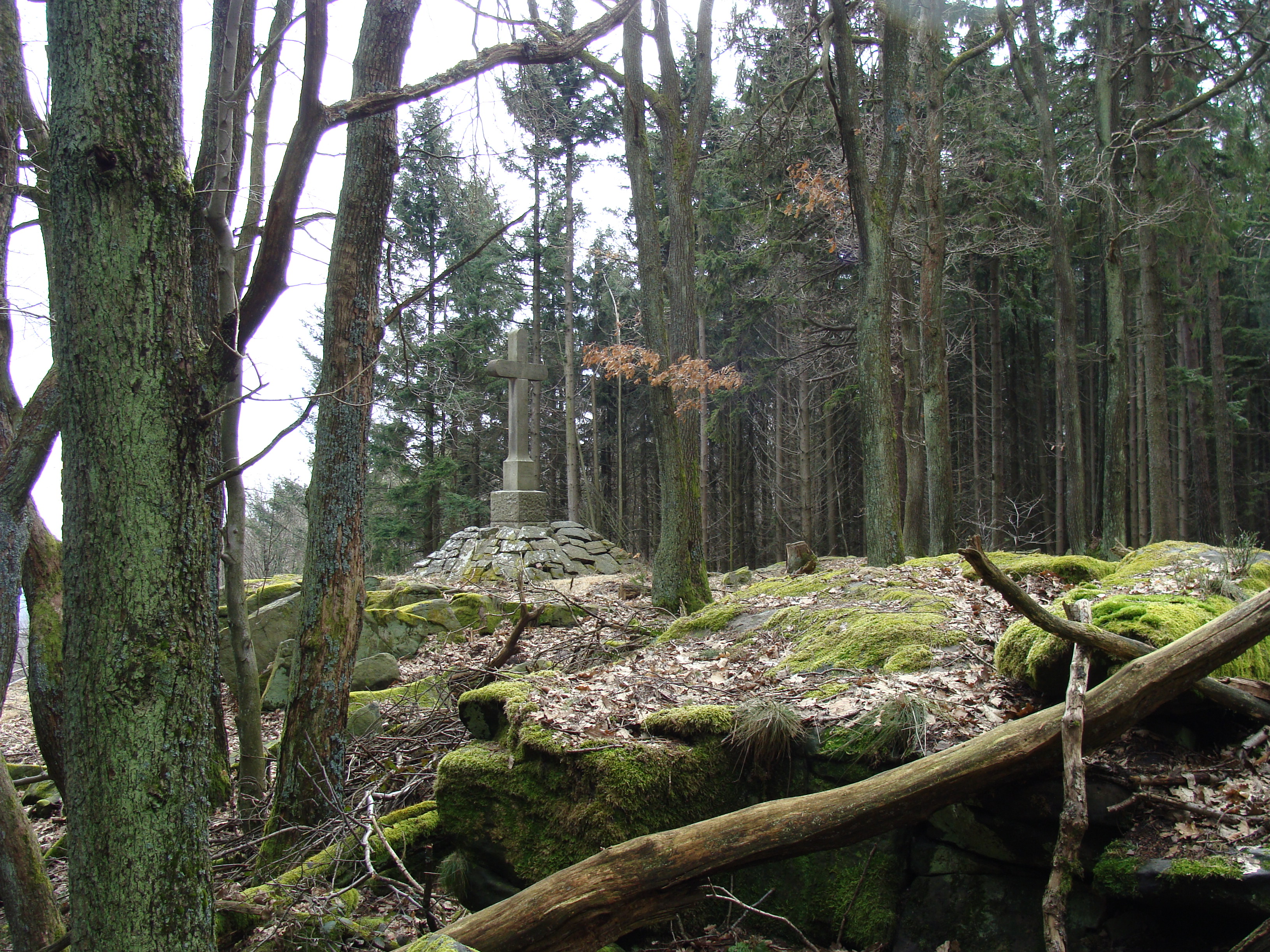
The summit with its weather cross

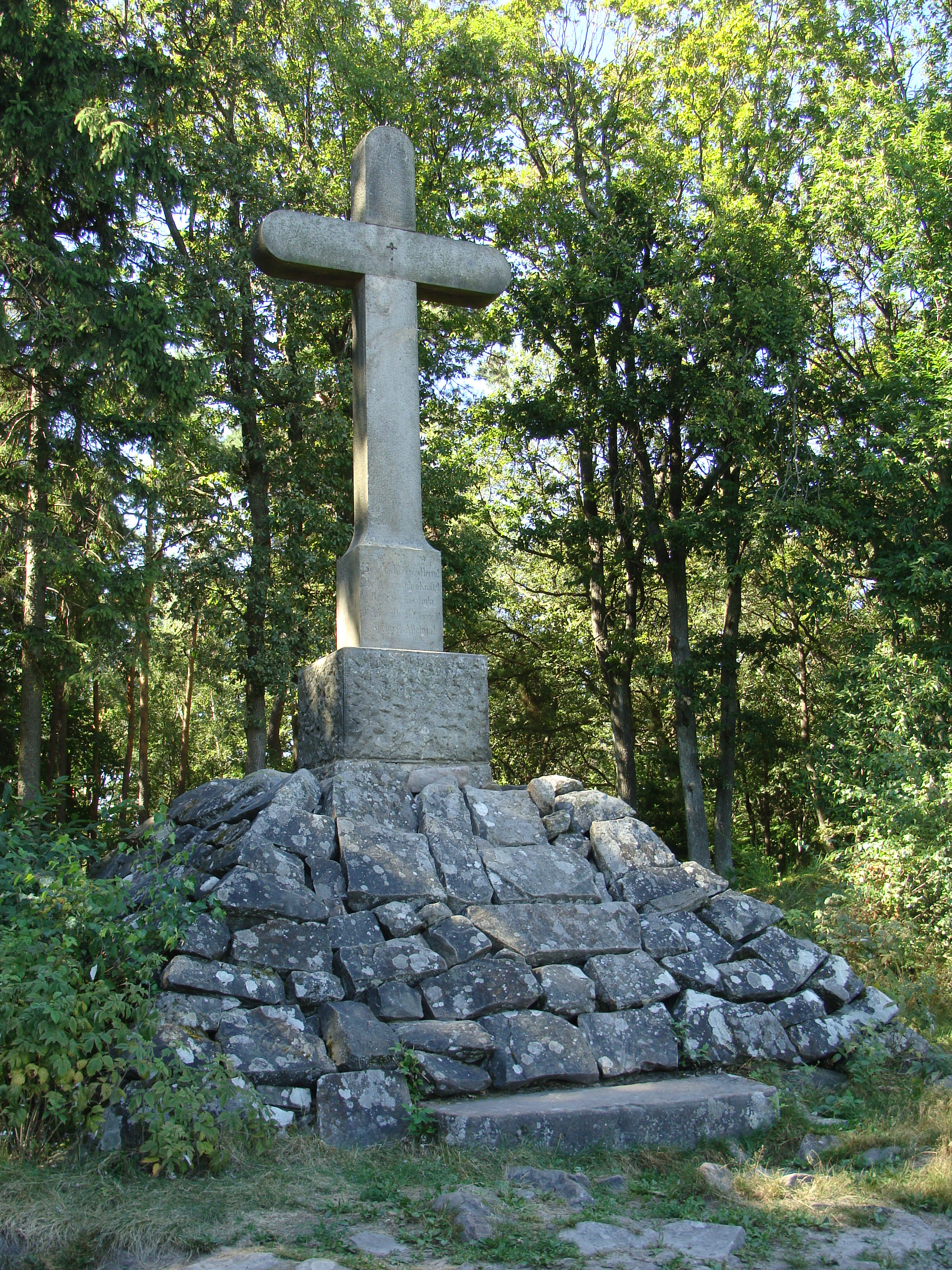
Weather cross

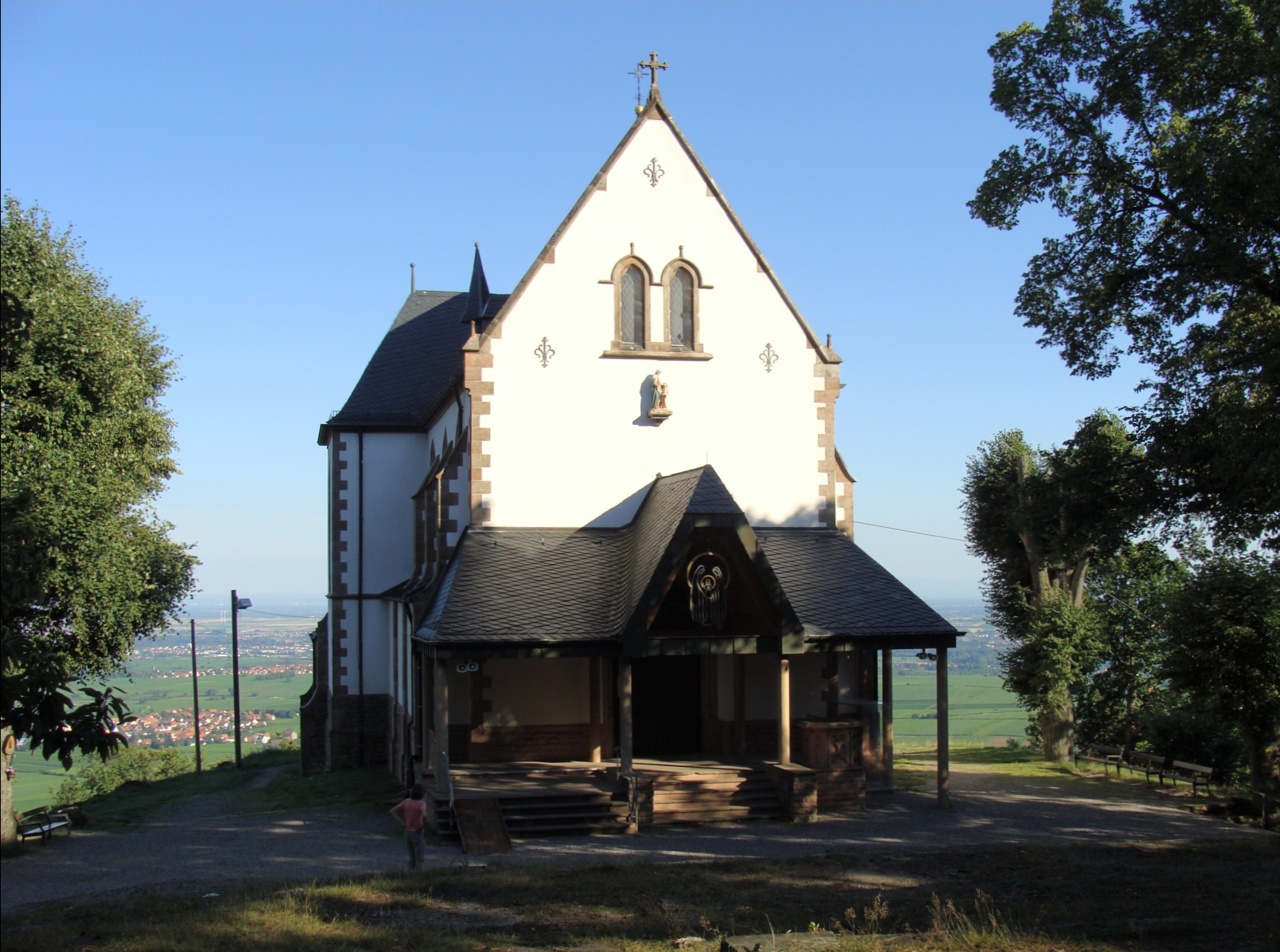
St. Anne's Chapel
