= Knöringen =

- Municipality
- Coat of arms

- Location of Knöringen within Südliche Weinstraße district
- Interactive map of Knöringen
- Location within Germany Location within Rhineland-Palatinate
- Coordinates: 49°14′17″N 8°08′40″E
- Country: Germany
- State: Rhineland-Palatinate
- District: Südliche Weinstraße
- Municipal assoc.: Landau-Land

Government
  - Mayor (2019–24): Dieter Ditsch

Area
  - Total: 2.52 km^{2} (0.97 sq mi)
- Elevation: 157 m (515 ft)

Population (2025-12-31)
  - Total: 435
  - Density: 173/km^{2} (447/sq mi)
- Time zone: UTC+01:00 (CET)
  - Summer (DST): UTC+02:00 (CEST)
- Postal codes: 76833
- Dialling codes: 06341
- Vehicle registration: SÜW
- Website: www.knoeringen.de

Knöringen is a municipality in Südliche Weinstraße district, in Rhineland-Palatinate, western Germany.
