= Anebos Castle =

Coordinates: 49°11′35″N 7°58′55″E

- Burg Anebos
- Anweiler, Rhineland-Palatinate, Germany

Site information
- Type: Rock castle
- Condition: Ruin

Location

Site history
- Built: Early 12th century

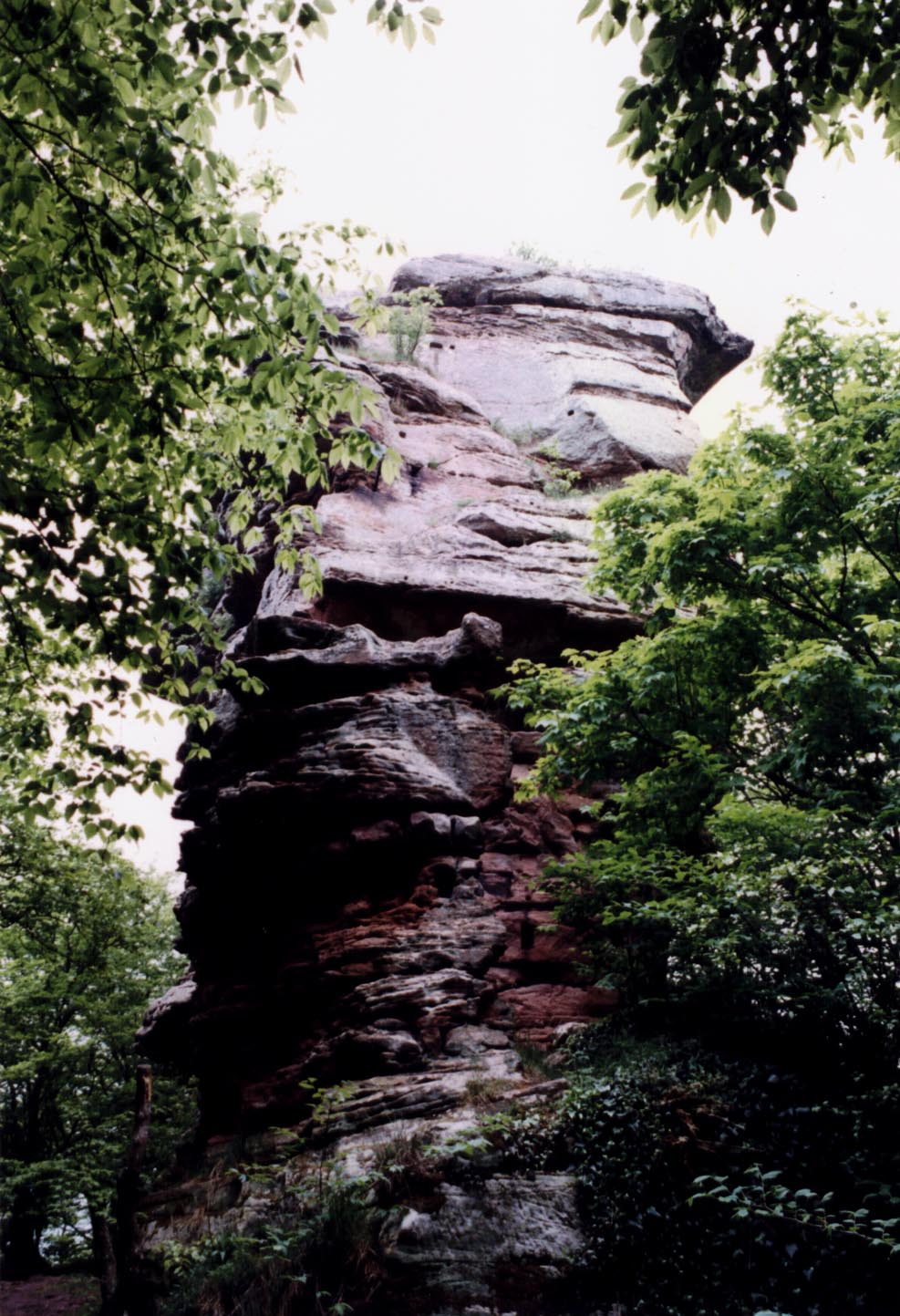
Ruins of Anebos Castle

Anebos Castle is a ruin of a medieval castle in the Palatinate Forest south of Anweiler in Rhineland-Palatinate, Germany. The name of the castle is probably derived from the German word "Amboss" (anvil).

== Geography ==
The remains of this castle are located on top of a 300-metre (980 ft) high, rocky low hill ridge at an elevation of 480 metres (1,570 ft). Anebos belongs to a group of castles, together with the Trifels Castle and the Scharfenberg Castle, located on rocky hilltops. This type of castle is known as hilltop castle or rock castle.

== Castle complex ==
Today there are only a few remains of the walls and the cistern. Until recent archaeological excavations the cistern was mistaken for a cellar. Additionally traces of stonemasonry can be seen on the rock.

== History ==
According to architectural research, the construction of the castle dates to the beginning of the 12th century. The castle was the ancestral seat of the lords of Anebos. They were ministeriales of highest administrative rank and reported directly to the imperator being responsible for the system of feudal tenure of the castle. Historic sources relating to the lords of Anebos exist only from the last decade of the 12th century until the middle of the 13th century.

In 1194, the Holy Roman Emperor, Henry VI was accompanied by marshal Eberhard of Anebos during the campaign against Italy. His brother Henry replaced him in 1196. Historic records mention an Eliza of Anebos as a widow of a marshal in 1234, 1250 and 1252. By the middle of the 13th century, the House of Anebos appears to have become extinct as there are no further records containing their family name.

It is assumed that the feudal tenure of the castle was passed on to the family of a seneschal called Philip I of Falkenstein. His wife, Isengard, transferred the castle back to king Conrad IV of Germany. This is evidence of the expiry of a tenure due to the lack of a male successor, which would require the return of a castle to the king. The last written record about the castle dates to 1266.

== Recent research ==
Excavations since 2000 supplied new evidence that the castle was inhabited until the 14th century. It appears that the castle was peacefully abandoned as no traces of destruction by military action was found.

== References (in German language) ==
- Jürgen Keddigkeit: Pfälzisches Burgenlexikon. Volume I. Pages 127–131. ISBN 3-927754-18-8
- Ludwig Petry: Handbuch der historischen Stätten. Volume V. ISBN 3-520-27503-1
