= Scharfenberg Castle (Palatinate) =

Castle ruin in Rhineland-Palatinate, Germany

- Burg Scharfenberg, Münz
- Leinsweiler
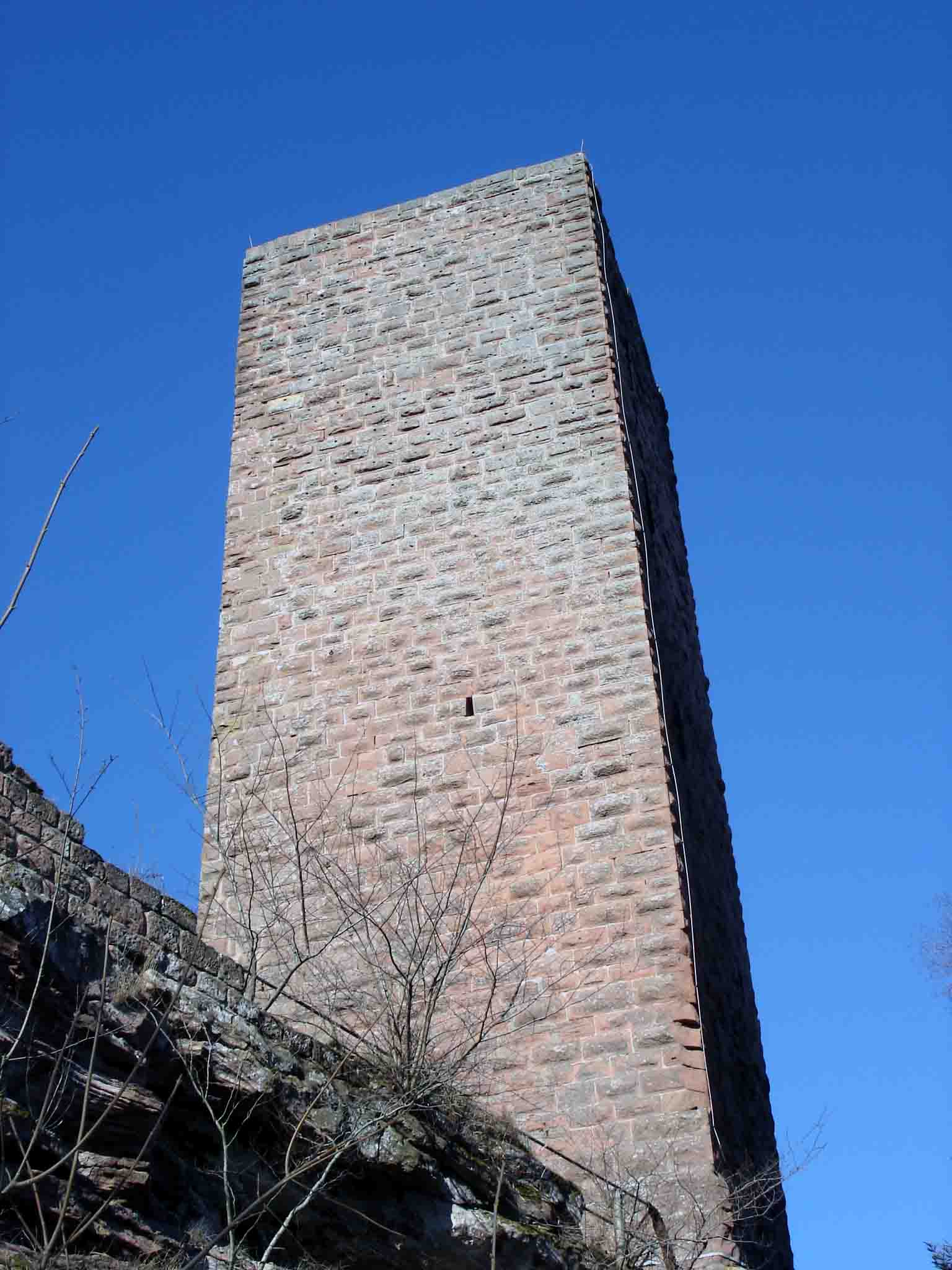
- The bergfried of Scharfenberg Castle

Site information
- Type: hill castle, rock castle
- Code: DE-RP
- Condition: ruin

Location
- Coordinates: 49°11′21″N 7°59′10″E
- Height: 489 m above sea level (NN)

Site history
- Built: ca. 1100 to 1150
- Materials: rusticated ashlar

Scharfenberg Castle (German: Burg Scharfenberg, popularly also called Münz), is the ruin of a medieval rock castle in the Palatine Forest in the German state of Rhineland-Palatinate. It is situated above the small South Palatine town of Annweiler.

== Geography ==
The hill castle lies in the forest estate of the municipality of Leinsweiler at a height of 489 metres on a rocky hill with a rounded summit, typical of the Wasgau region, as the southern part of the Palatine Forest and the adjoining northern part of the Vosges is called. Scharfenberg and its sister castles, Trifels and Anebos are known as the Trifels Group and are the symbol of Annweiler, which sprawls beneath them in the valley meadows of the River Queich. In the immediate vicinity lie the sites of two other castles, the Fensterfels and the Has.

== Description ==
The landmark of the castle is a 20-metre-high bergfried, whose walls are made of rusticated ashlars from the Hohenstaufen era. In addition, parts of the well tower and enceinte may still be seen.

== History ==
=== Chronicle ===
Scharfenberg Castle was built in the first half of the 12th century under the Hohenstaufen king, Conrad III, who died in 1152. It was initially probably used as a state gaol. After its subsequent owners, a ministeriales family, had been named Scharfenberg, it became the seat of the most important member of the family in the early 13th century, the Bishop of Speyer and Chancellor of the Holy Roman Empire, Conrad III of Scharfenberg. Since its destruction during the Peasants' War in 1525, the castle has lain in ruins.

=== Popular name ===
Its popular name, Münz, is often thought to relate to the right of coinage (Münzrecht) which was granted to Annweiler in 1219 together with its town rights. It was suspected that the town had its coins minted at the castle. However, this would have been very inconvenient and full of risk due to the isolation of the castle and its distance from the town. Its name is more likely to be derived from the Latin word munitio, which means "fortress" or "stronghold". Many other buildings in the Palatinate bear this name without having been connected with a mint.

== Literature ==
- Rüdiger Bernges: Felsenburgen im Wasgau. Warlich Druck Ahrweiler GmbH, Wuppertal, 2005, ISBN 3-930376-25-3, p. 261–263.
- Marco Bollheimer (2011), Felsenburgen im Burgenparadies Wasgau–Nordvogesen (in German) (3. ed.), Karlsruhe: Selbstverlag, pp. 36–39, ISBN 978-3-9814506-0-6
- Walter Herrmann: Auf rotem Fels. G. Braun Buchverlag, Karlsruhe, 2004, ISBN 3-7650-8286-4, pp. 184–185.
- Jürgen Keddigkeit, Ulrich Burkhart, Rolf Übel: Pfälzisches Burgenlexikon, Band 4.1. Institut für pfälzische Geschichte und Volkskunde, Kaiserslautern, 2007, ISBN 978-3-927754-56-0, pp. 424–439.
- Alexander Thon (ed.): ... wie eine gebannte, unnahbare Zauberburg. Burgen in der Südpfalz. 2., verbesserte Auflage. Schnell und Steiner, Regensburg, 2005, ISBN 3-7954-1570-5, pp. 132–137.
