= Böchingen =

- Municipality
- Coat of arms

- Location of Böchingen within Südliche Weinstraße district
- Interactive map of Böchingen
- Location within Germany Location within Rhineland-Palatinate
- Coordinates: 49°14′19″N 8°05′32″E
- Country: Germany
- State: Rhineland-Palatinate
- District: Südliche Weinstraße
- Municipal assoc.: Landau-Land

Government
  - Mayor (2019–24): Reinhold Walter

Area
  - Total: 5.35 km^{2} (2.07 sq mi)
- Elevation: 206 m (676 ft)

Population (2025-12-31)
  - Total: 750
  - Density: 140/km^{2} (360/sq mi)
- Time zone: UTC+01:00 (CET)
  - Summer (DST): UTC+02:00 (CEST)
- Postal codes: 76833
- Dialling codes: 06341
- Vehicle registration: SÜW
- Website: www.boechingen.de

Böchingen (German pronunciation: [ˈbœçɪŋən]) is a municipality in the Südliche Weinstraße district, in Rhineland-Palatinate, Germany.
