= Frankweiler =

- Municipality
- Coat of arms

- Location of Frankweiler within Südliche Weinstraße district
- Interactive map of Frankweiler
- Location within Germany Location within Rhineland-Palatinate
- Coordinates: 49°13′49″N 8°03′29″E
- Country: Germany
- State: Rhineland-Palatinate
- District: Südliche Weinstraße
- Municipal assoc.: Landau-Land

Government
  - Mayor (2019–24): Bernd Nerding

Area
  - Total: 7 km^{2} (2.7 sq mi)
- Elevation: 243 m (797 ft)

Population (2025-12-31)
  - Total: 896
  - Density: 130/km^{2} (330/sq mi)
- Time zone: UTC+01:00 (CET)
  - Summer (DST): UTC+02:00 (CEST)
- Postal codes: 76833
- Dialling codes: 06345
- Vehicle registration: SÜW
- Website: www.frankweiler.de

Frankweiler (German pronunciation: [ˈfʁaŋkvaɪlɐ]) is a municipality in Südliche Weinstraße district, in Rhineland-Palatinate, western Germany. Its sister city is Cullman, Alabama, United States.
