= Trifels Castle =

- Reichsburg Trifels
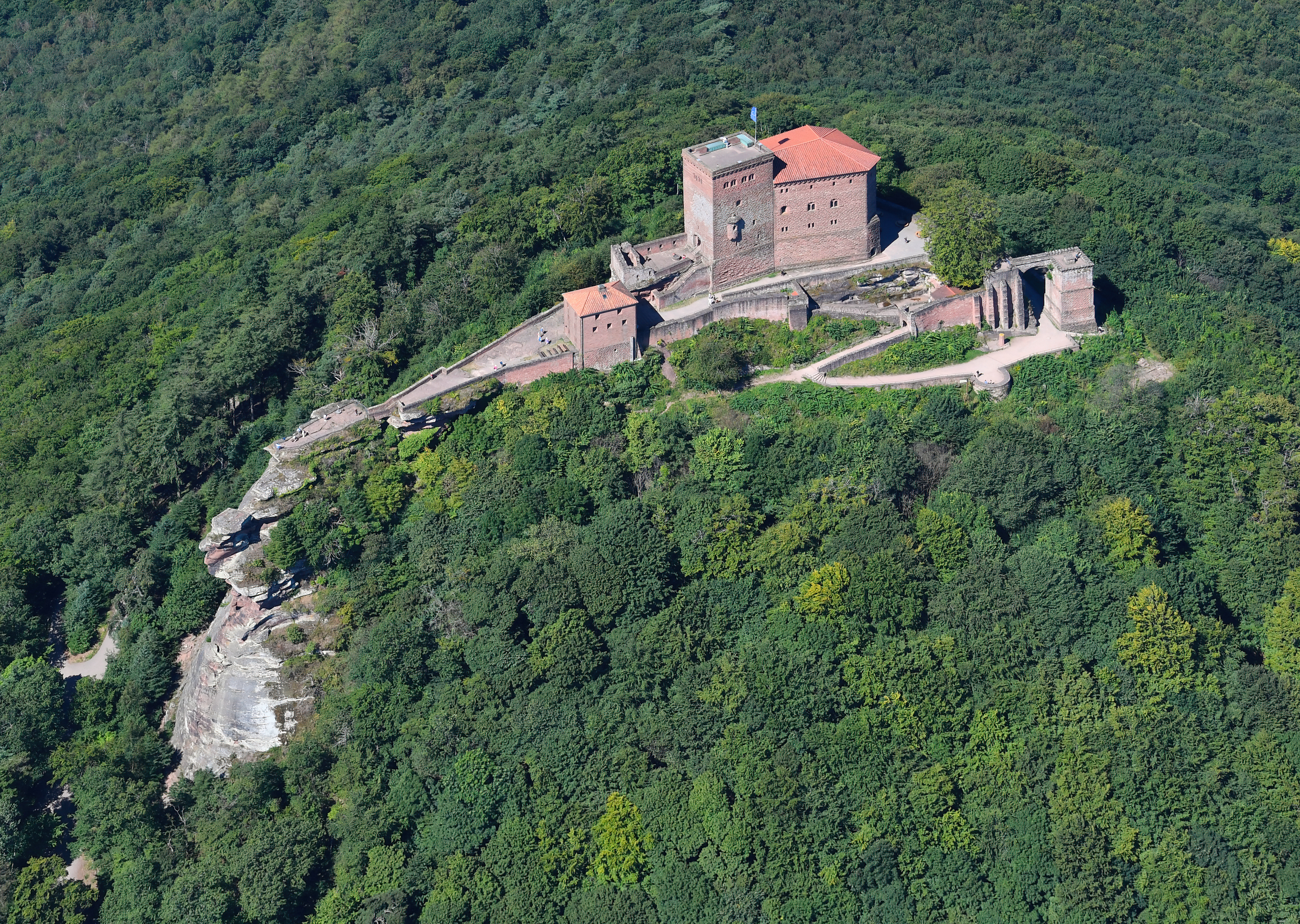
- Trifels Castle as seen from the air

- Location within Rhineland-Palatinate Trifels Castle (Germany)
- Alternative names: Burg Trifels

General information
- Status: partially restored
- Type: Rock castle
- Location: Annweiler am Trifels, Germany
- Coordinates: 49°11′46″N 7°58′44″E
- Elevation: 479m
- Governing body: General Directorate for Cultural Heritage Rhineland-Palatinate

Trifels Castle (German: Reichsburg Trifels, pronounced [ˈʁaɪçsˌbʊʁk ˈtʁiːfɛls]) is a reconstructed medieval castle at an elevation of 500 m (1,600 ft) near the small town of Annweiler, in the Palatinate region of southwestern Germany. It is located high above the Queich valley within the Palatinate Forest on one peak of a red sandstone mountain split into three. Trifels Castle is on the peak of the Sonnenberg, and on both of the other two rock elevations there are castle ruins: Anebos Castle and Scharfenberg Castle (demotically called Münz).

Trifels Castle has been gradually restored since the 19th century and today replicas of the Imperial Regalia (Reichskleinodien) of the Holy Roman Empire are on display here. It is—together with Hambach Castle—one of the most popular tourist destinations in the state of Rhineland-Palatinate.

== History ==
The castle in Rhenish Franconia was first mentioned in a 1081 deed of donation, when it was held by a local noble Diemar, a relative of Archbishop Siegfried I of Mainz. From him Trifels passed to the Imperial Salian dynasty. Emperor Henry V in 1113 made it a Reichsburg (Imperial Castle), rejecting the inheritance claims raised by Archbishop Adalbert of Mainz. The archbishop, allied with Henry's opponent Lothair of Supplinburg, had to spend several years of imprisonment at Trifels.

Upon the death of Emperor Henry V in 1125, his nephew Duke Frederick II of Swabia made the castle a place of safekeeping for the Imperial Regalia of the Hohenstaufen emperors until in 1220 Frederick II of Hohenstaufen moved them to Waldburg Castle in Swabia.

Trifels Castle is also famous as the site where Richard the Lionheart, King of England was imprisoned after he was captured by Duke Leopold V of Austria near Vienna in December 1192 on his return from the Third Crusade. Handed over to Emperor Henry VI of Hohenstaufen, a period of three weeks of captivity at Trifels from 31 March to 19 April 1193 is well documented. According to one legend, Richard was found by the trobador Blondel de Nesle, who reported the king's location to his friends; in fact, Richard's location was not a secret.

Trifels Castle lost its importance with the Interregnum. After the fall of the Hohenstaufen dynasty, the castle was pledged several times. In 1330, it was mortgaged to the Electoral Palatinate. It finally fell to the Dukes of Palatinate-Simmern and Zweibrücken in 1410 and decayed after the Thirty Years' War. Deserted and derelict, the ruin served as a stone quarry, as a result of which the late-Romanesque residential building almost completely disappeared and the outer bailey for the most part.

From about 1840, the Wittelsbach kings of Bavaria had the castle rebuilt. After Ludwig I of Bavaria had reconstruction plans prepared by his court architect August von Voit already in 1851, Georg von Schacky made a reconstruction drawing in 1881 and the Trifels Association (founded in 1860) had carried out structural measures in 1882, in particular the erection of the great well arch, the Munich architect Rudolf Esterer designed a monumental rebuilding project following the model of south Italian Hohenstaufen castles, initiated by the Trifels Association and born by the cultural-political ideology of the Nazi epoch.

The Nazi era reconstruction in 1938–1942 and later reconstructions in 1946–1959 (residential building), 1960 (1st castellan's house), 1963–1966 (heightening of the keep), 1972–1978 (safeguarding and enclosing wall) and 1988–1989 (2nd castellan's house) utilized in part the preserved walls from the Middle Ages or those found by archaeological investigations in 1935–1937, but also in many cases rigorously ignored the original medieval findings and created essentially an architectural reinterpretation of the 20th century.

The present-day castle is in large parts not true to the medieæval original. It is characterized by a large well tower outside the ring wall, linked to the castle by a bridge. The surrounding rocky landscape is a popular venue for mountaineers.

== Gallery ==
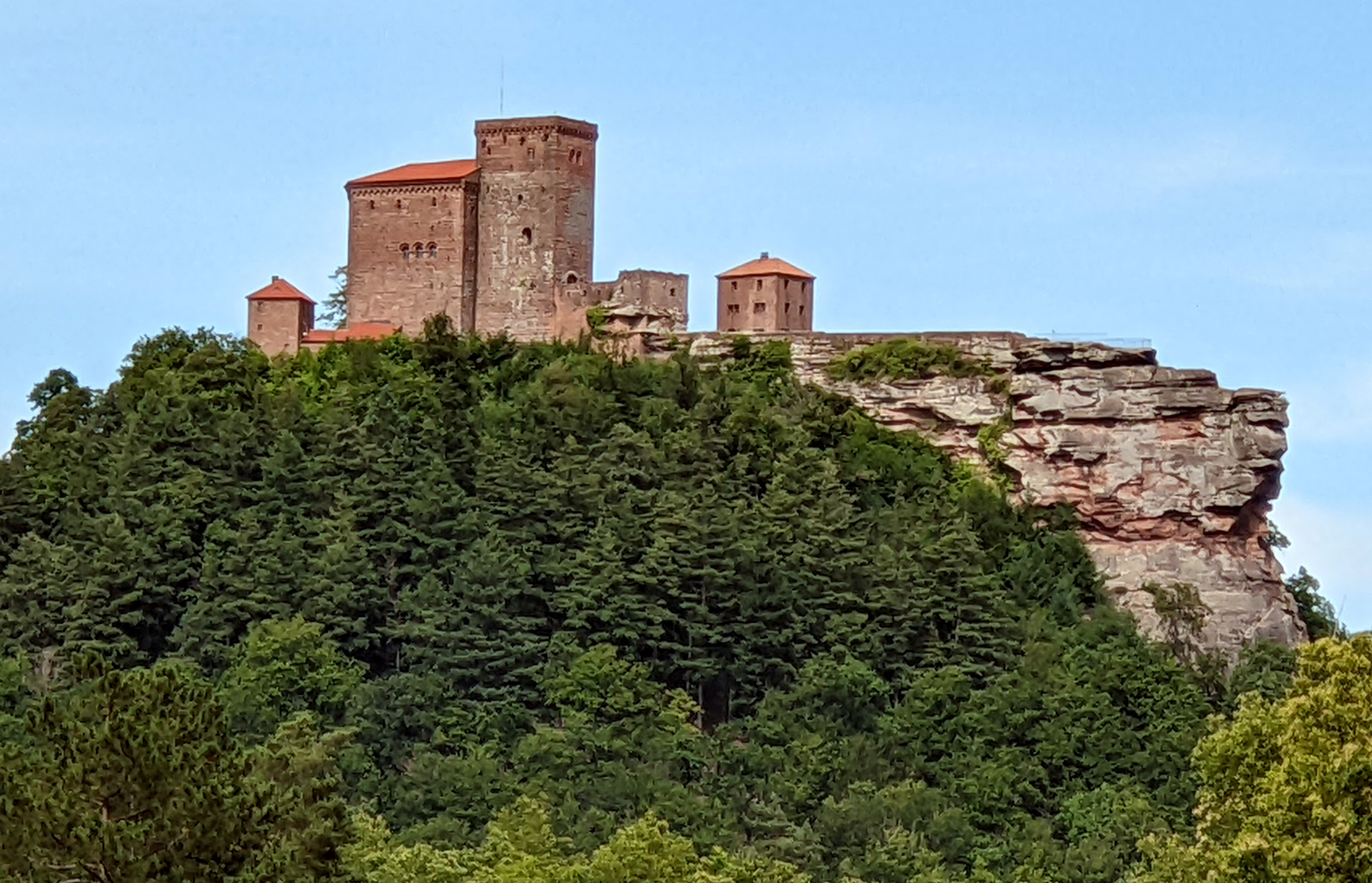
Remote view

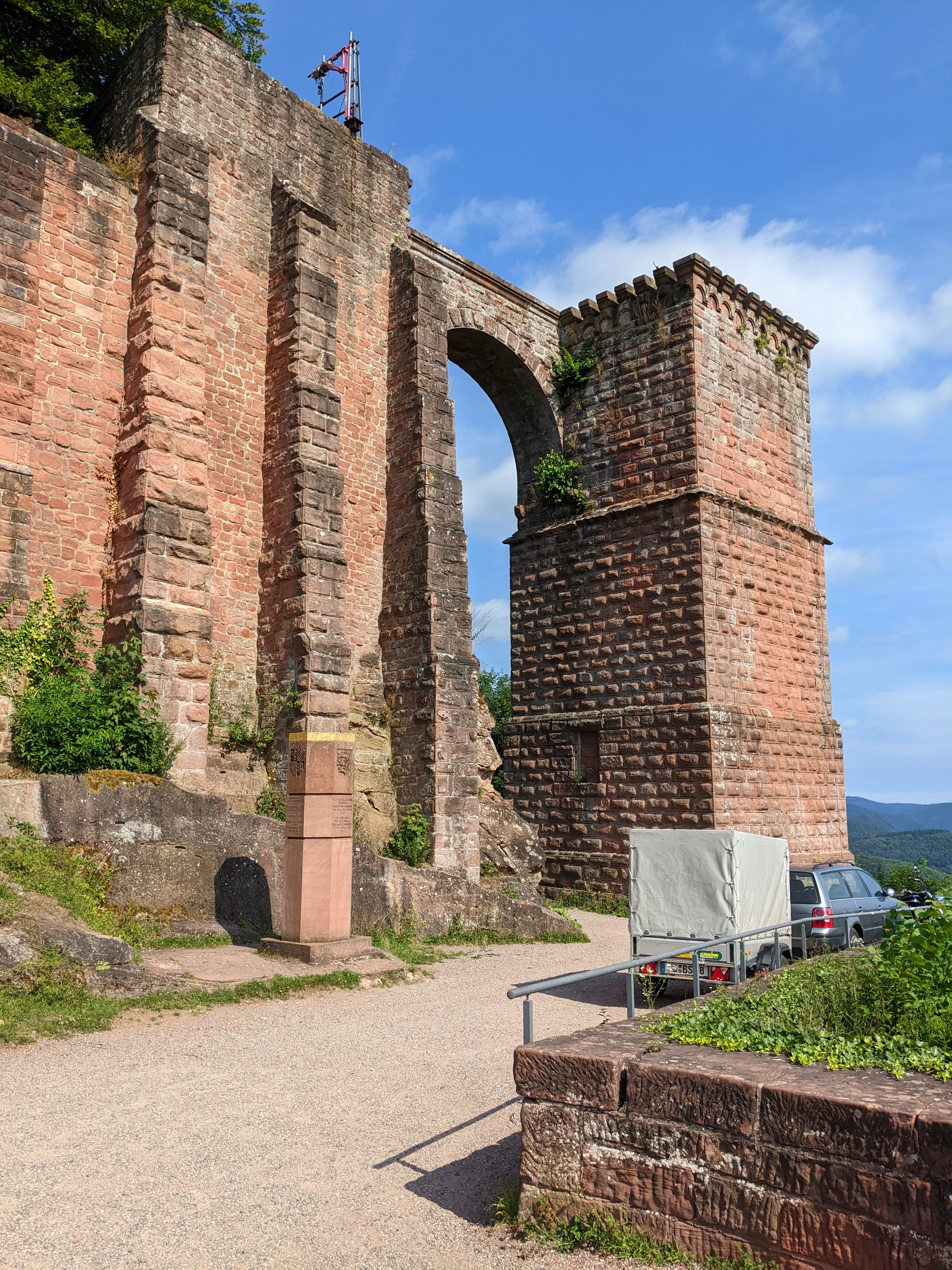
Entrance tower

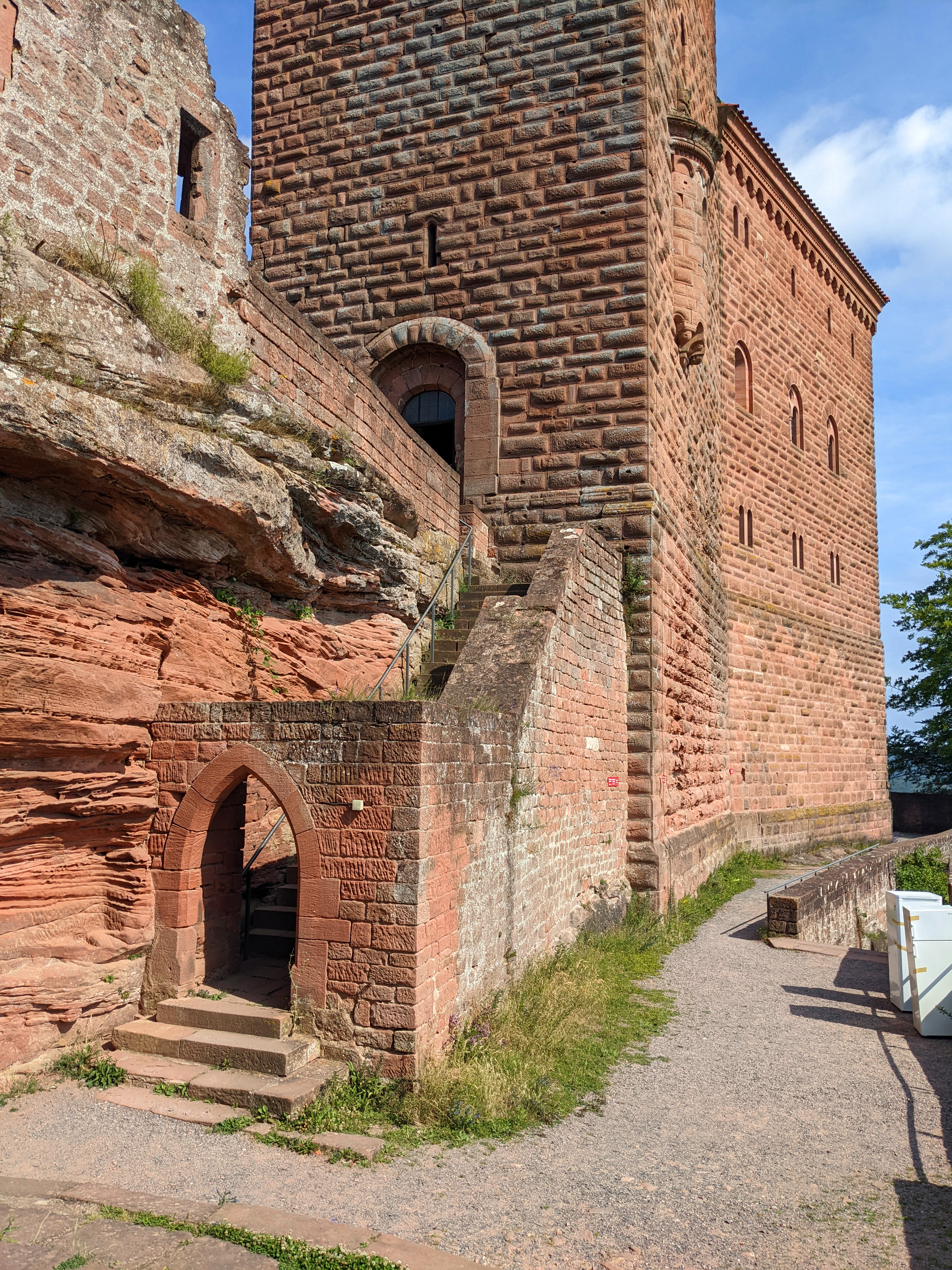
Stairway

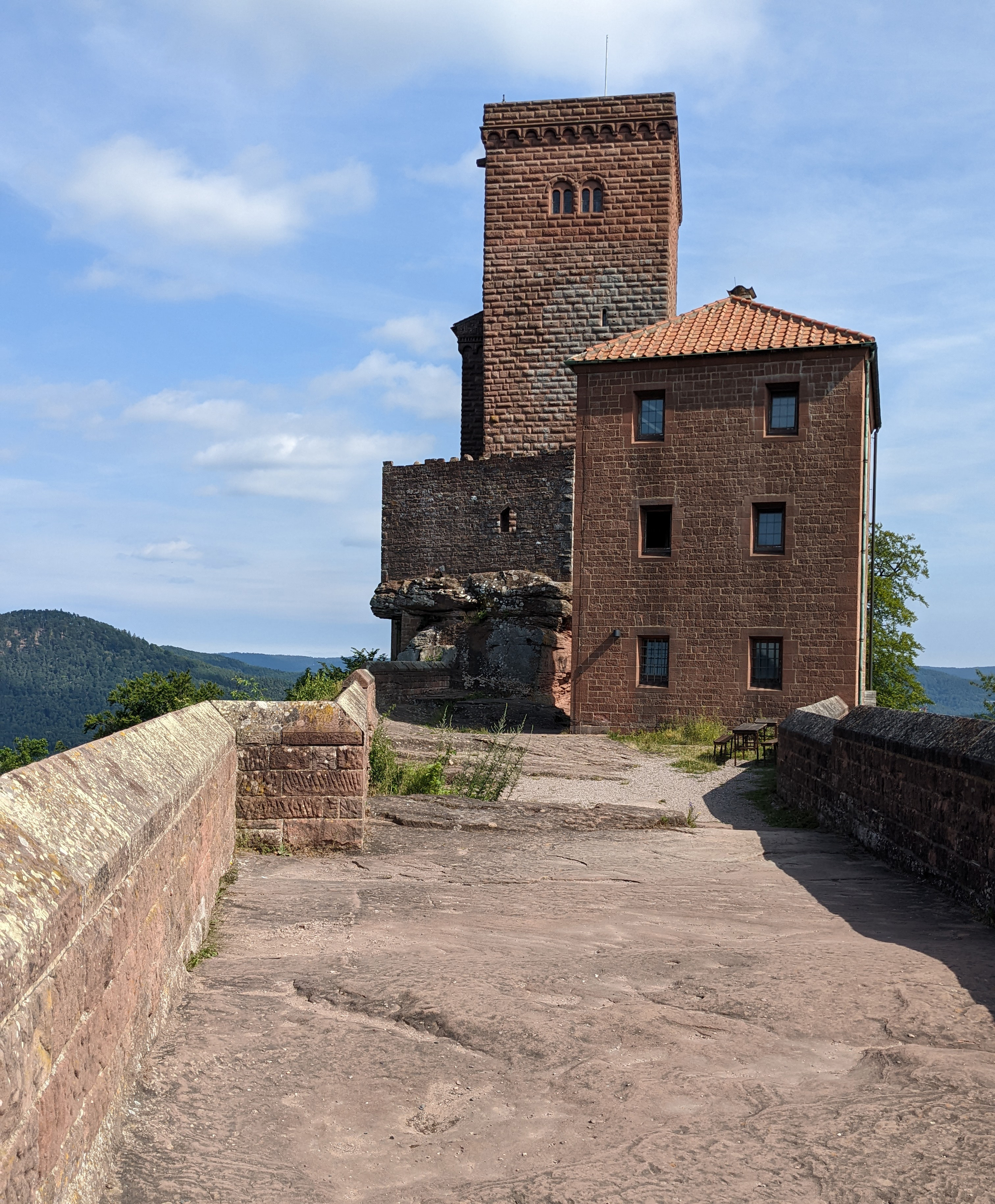
Main tower

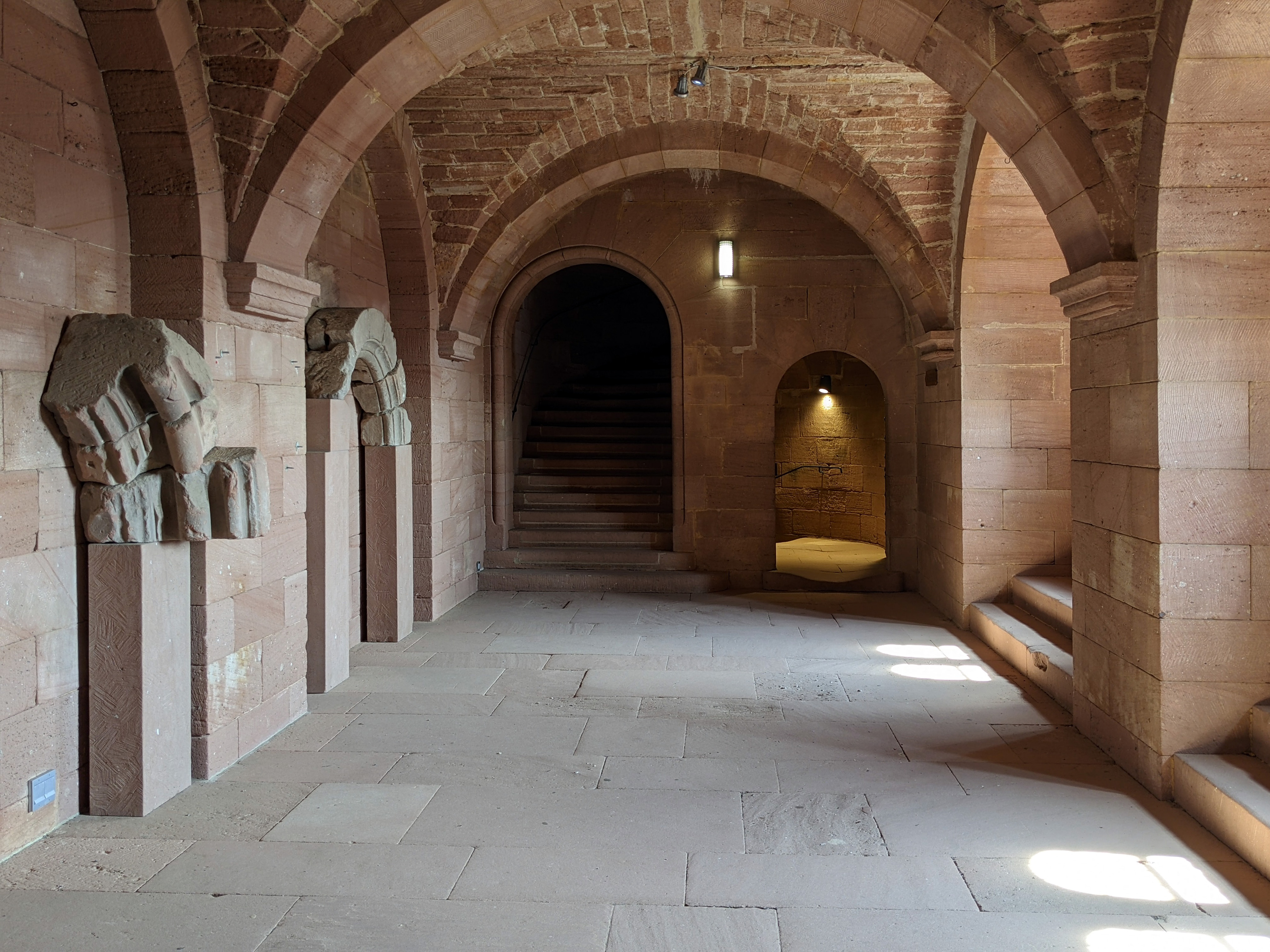
Vaulted passage

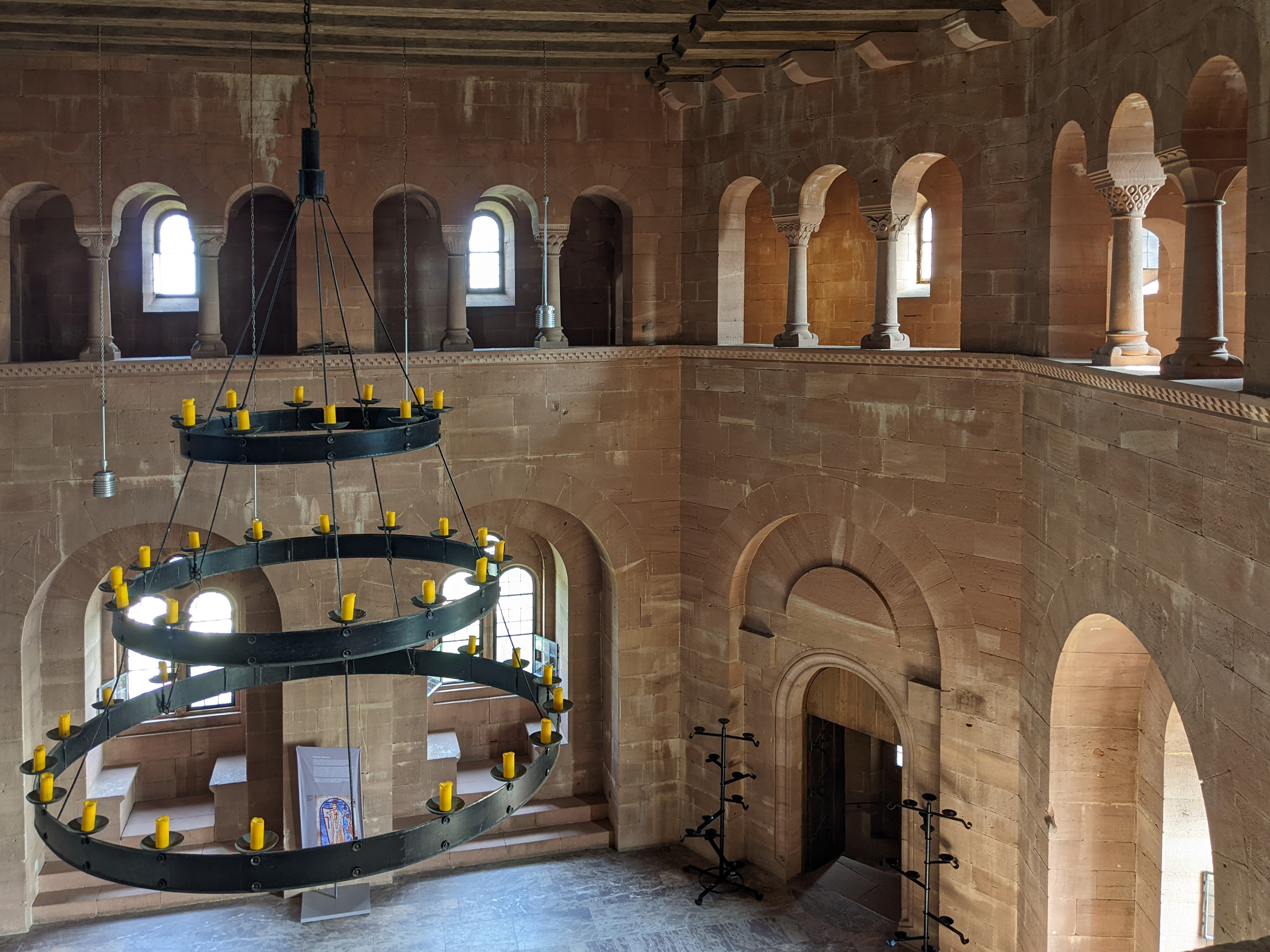
Castle hall

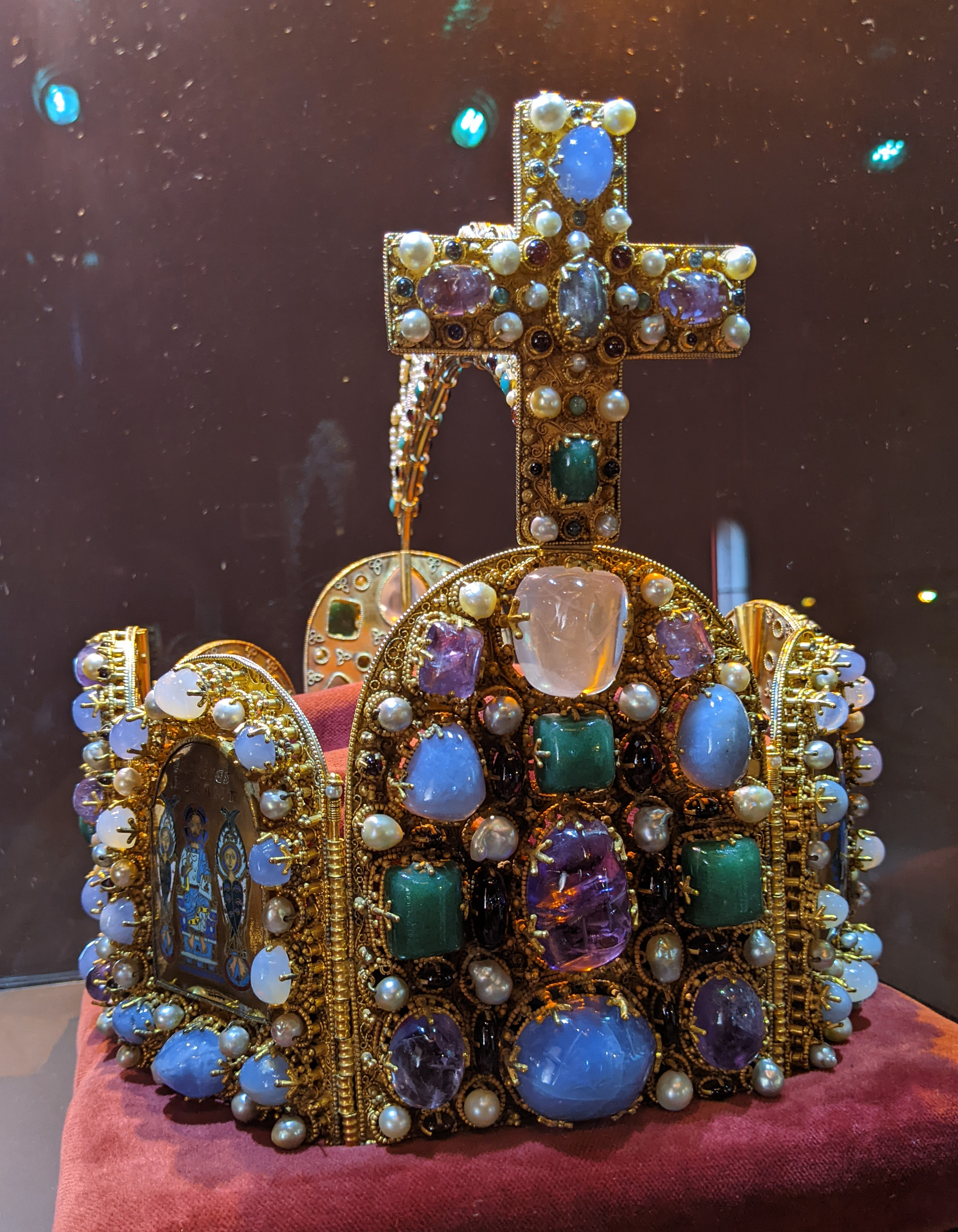
Copy of the Imperial Regalia

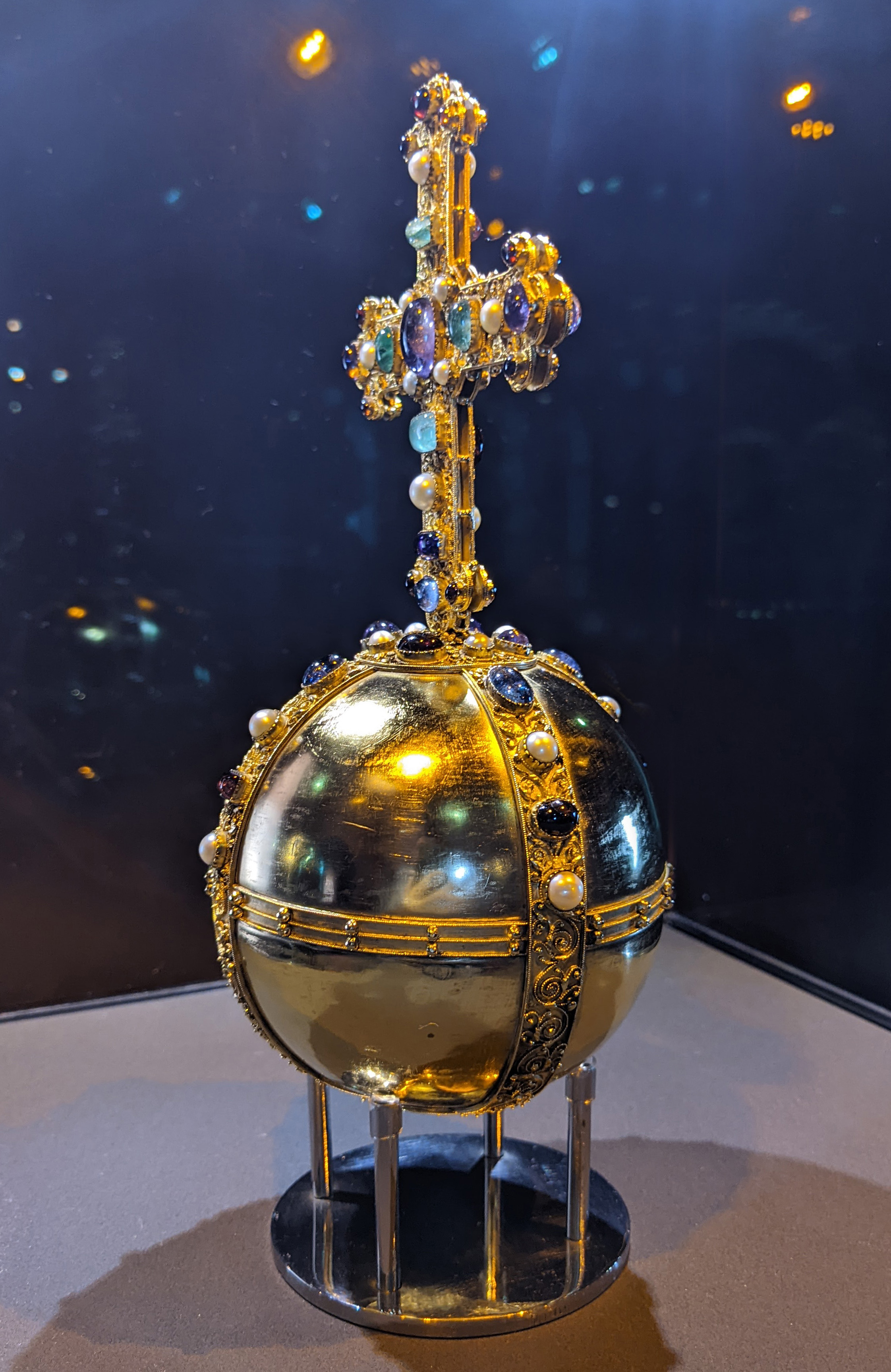
Copy of the Imperial Regalia

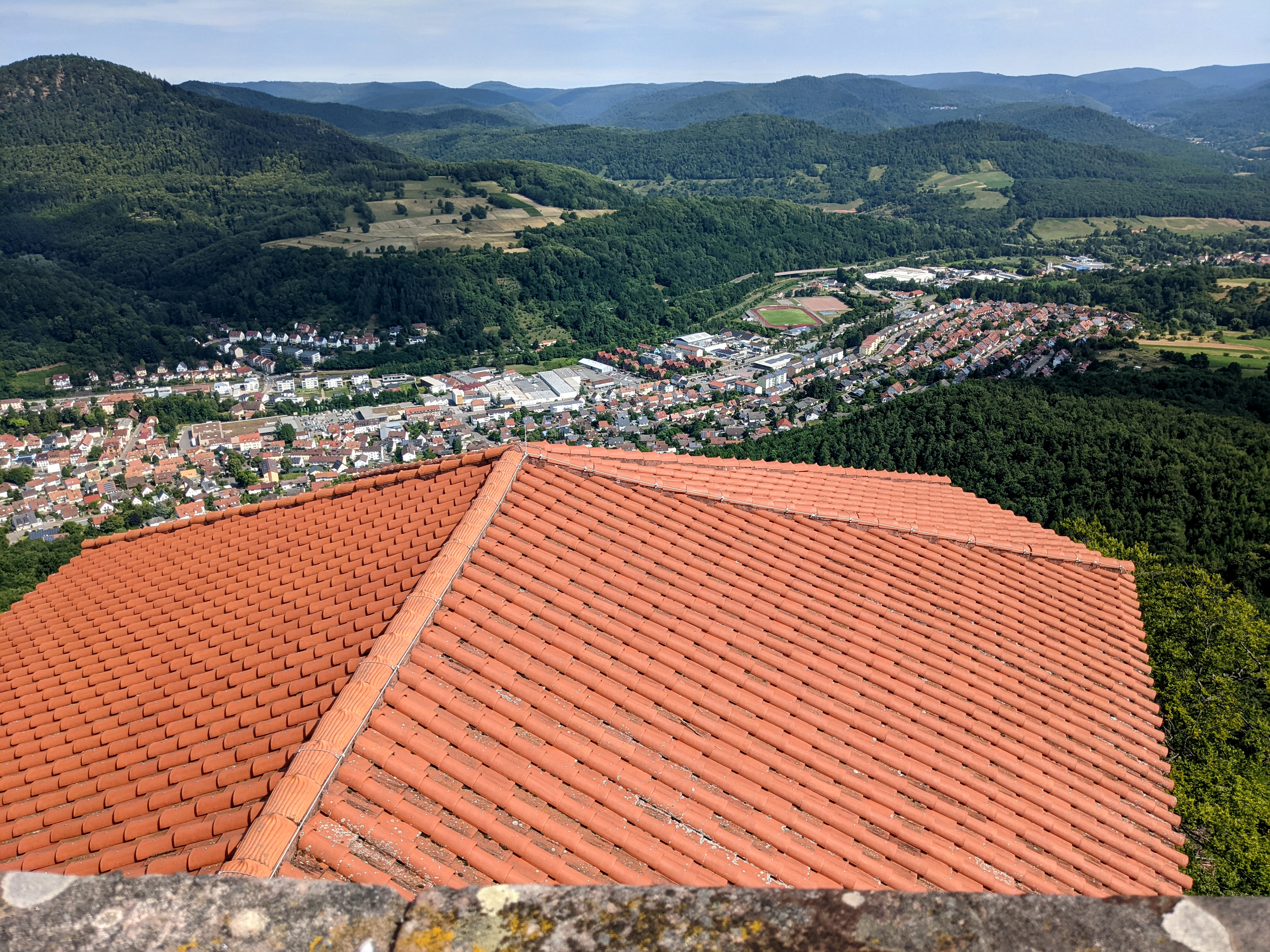
View towards Annweiler

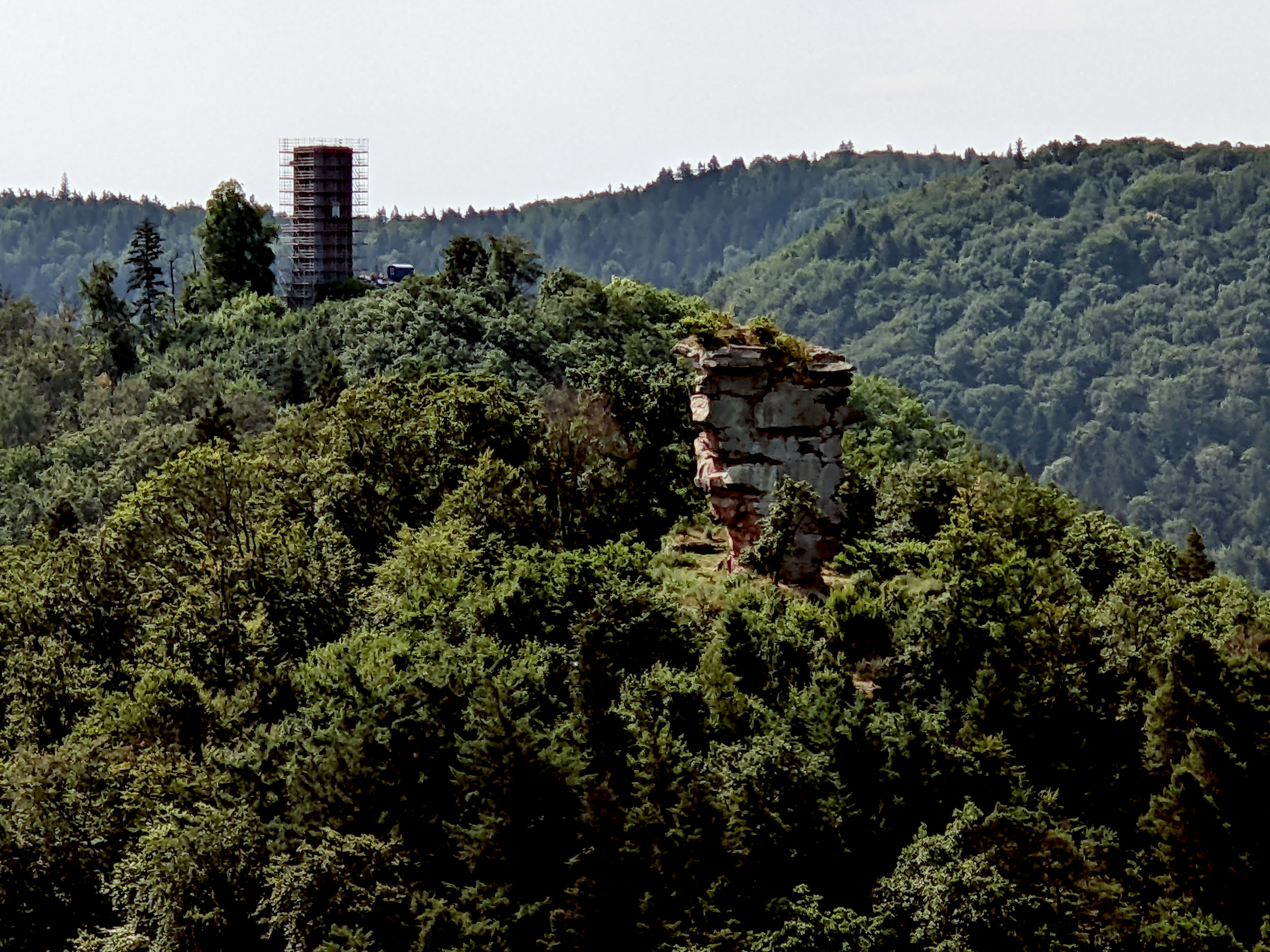
View towards Scharfenberg and Anebos
