= Walsheim =

- Municipality
- Coat of arms

- Location of Walsheim within Südliche Weinstraße district
- Interactive map of Walsheim
- Location within Germany Location within Rhineland-Palatinate
- Coordinates: 49°14′17″N 8°07′31″E
- Country: Germany
- State: Rhineland-Palatinate
- District: Südliche Weinstraße
- Municipal assoc.: Landau-Land

Government
  - Mayor (2019–24): Jörg Keller

Area
  - Total: 5.15 km^{2} (1.99 sq mi)
- Elevation: 171 m (561 ft)

Population (2025-12-31)
  - Total: 630
  - Density: 120/km^{2} (320/sq mi)
- Time zone: UTC+01:00 (CET)
  - Summer (DST): UTC+02:00 (CEST)
- Postal codes: 76833
- Dialling codes: 06341
- Vehicle registration: SÜW
- Website: www.walsheim-pfalz.de

Walsheim is a municipality in Südliche Weinstraße district, in Rhineland-Palatinate, western Germany.
