= Berlingen =

Berlingen may refer to the following places:

- Berlingen, Switzerland, in the canton of Thurgau, Switzerland
- Berlingen, Germany, in Rhineland-Palatinate, Germany
