= Kasselburg =

- Castilburg, Castelberch
- Pelm
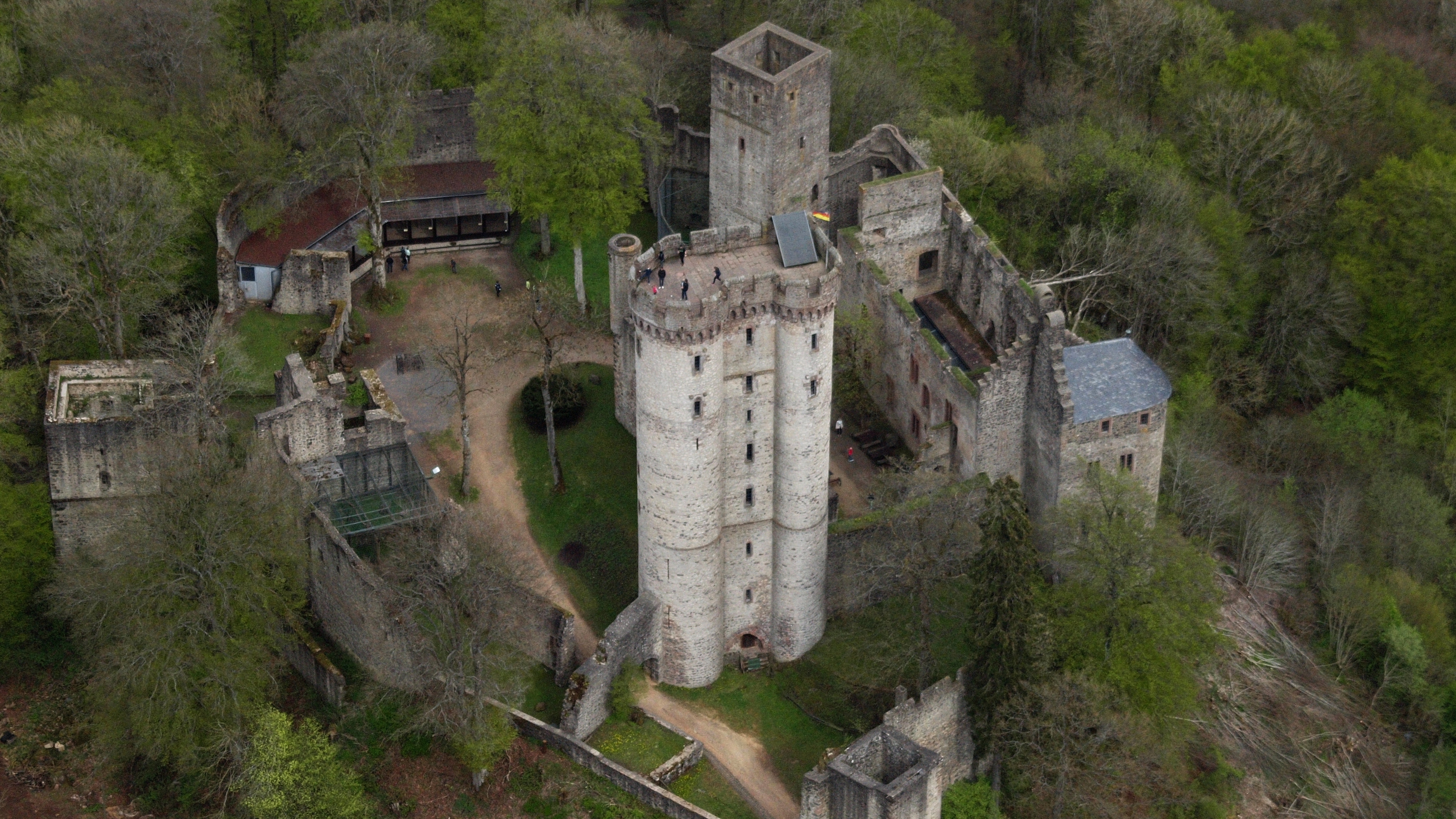
- Kasselburg, aerial view from the west (2015)

Site information
- Type: hill castle
- Code: DE-RP
- Condition: largely preserved

Location
- Coordinates: 50°14′21″N 6°41′7″E
- Height: 490 m above sea level (NHN)

Site history
- Built: 1100 bis 1200

Garrison information
- Occupants: nobility, counts, dukes

The Kasselburg is a ruined hill castle on a 490-metre-high basalt massif in Pelm near Gerolstein in the county of Vulkaneifel in the German state of Rhineland-Palatinate.

== Description ==
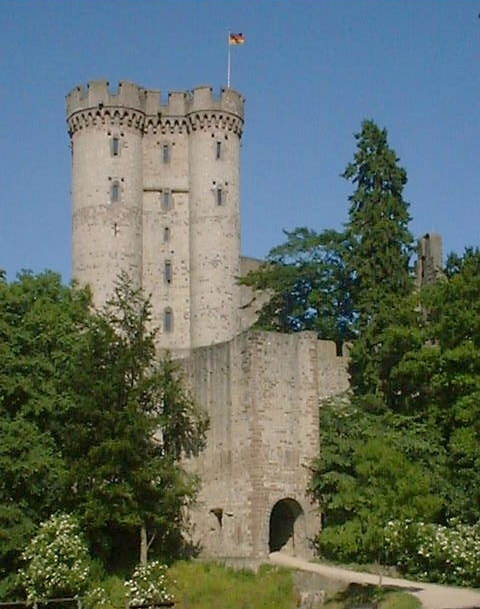
Gate tower and tower house of the Kasselburg

The symbol of the Kasselburg is its 37-metre-high, double tower, which functioned as a gate tower and tower house, whose origins are not precisely clear. Hitherto it had been assumed that the lords of Blankenheim had built it shortly after 1335, but structural investigations have shown that the tower underwent several phases of construction and cannot just be the work of one architect. The gate probably lost its guarding function with the expansion of the castle from 1452. It is from that period that the large outer bailey, with its burgmann houses and domestic buildings, dates.

The double tower is open to the public and has a good view of the surrounding area but, despite its size, is not a bergfried (fighting tower). The latter, built around 1200, is smaller and stands in the eastern part of the inner bailey. It has a square ground plan and was turned into a tower house in the 14th century.

Also part of the inner ward is the almost 33-metre-long palas, which dates to the 14th century.

== History ==
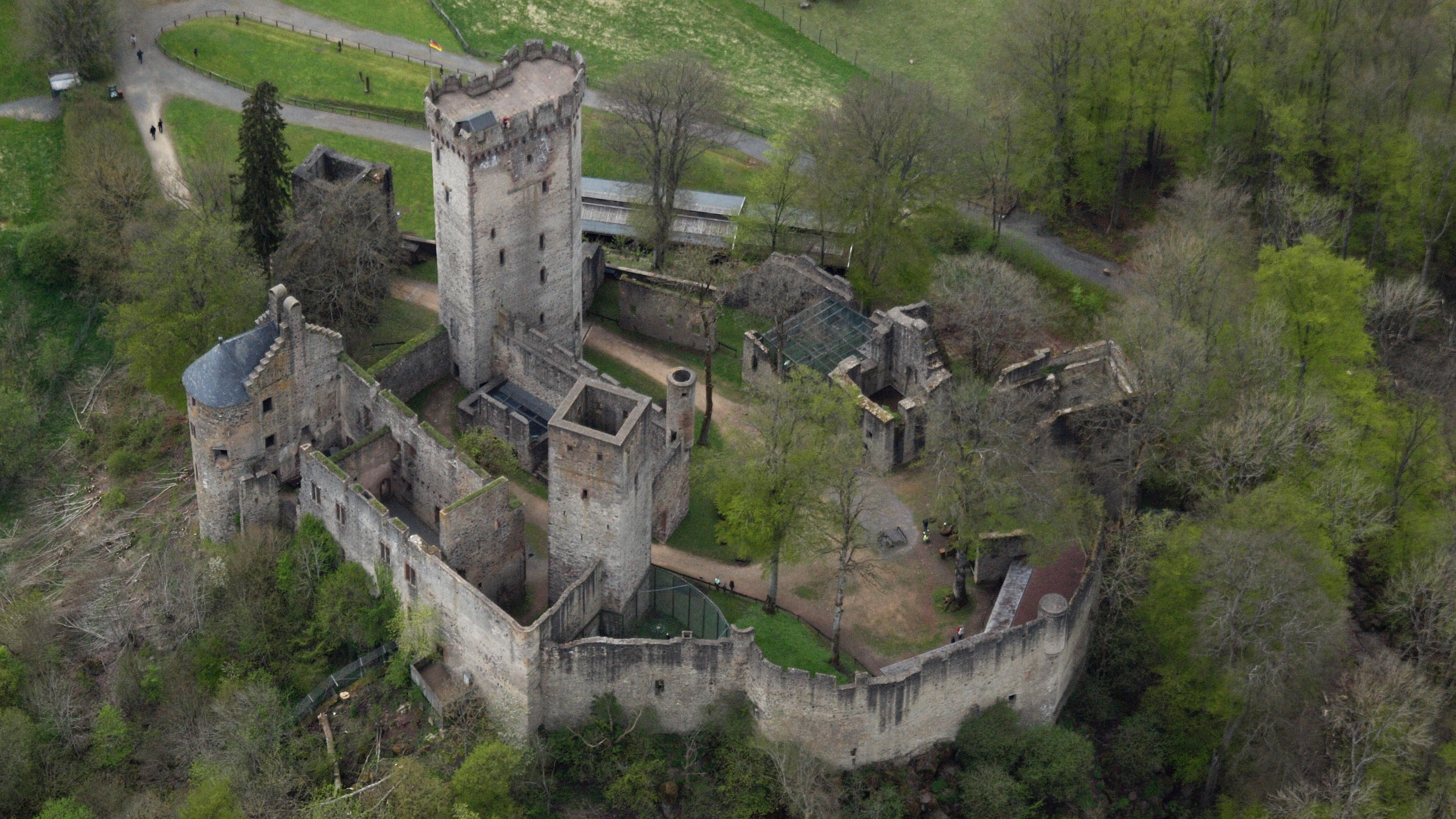
Kasselburg, eastern view, aerial view (2015)

The castle was built in the 12th century. Its owners may have been the lords of Castel, but this is not entirely certain. The castle was first mentioned in 1291 as the Castilburg. In 1314, it is called Castelberch.

According to the current state of research, it is not clear who the owner of the castle was before 1335. However, it is certain that Gerhard V of Blankenheim became its owner following a division of inheritance in that year and thus founded the Blankenheim-Kasselburg line. In 1406, this line of Blankenheims, which had been elevated to the countship, died out with Count Gerhard VII. The castle then passed by marriage to William I of Loen and thus to Heinsberg.

Other owners followed, including the counts of the Mark, dukes of Arenberg and prince-electors of Trier. Many interest groups have claimed the Kasselburg for themselves throughout history, so that in 1674 the Imperial Chamber Court of Wetzlar was called upon to put an end to the property disputes. When the judges awarded the castle to the dukes of Arenberg, the buildings soon served as barracks for the Duke of Arenberg's artillery. This marked the beginning of the decline of the castle: in the 18th century it was still temporarily the seat of an Arenberg forester, but by 1744 it was described as dilapidated.

After France seized the castle in 1794, it went to the Prussia in 1815. An impulse to rescue the ruin came unexpectedly from King Frederick William IV in 1838. After a visit he initiated repair work, and after the completion of the railway line from Cologne to Trier, the railway company donated 1,000 talers to open up the then already famous double tower in order to "offer its passengers something".

At the beginning of the 20th century, the state historic preservation authorities carried out further restoration. The Castle Administration of Rhineland-Palatinate, who took over Kasselburg in 1946, also had conservation measures carried out. In the meantime, the site has been placed under the care of the Directorate for Castles, Palaces and Ancient Monuments of the General Directorate for Cultural Heritage Rhineland-Palatinate, since 1998 the successors to the former Castle Administration.

== Literature ==
- Alfred Dahn: Die Kasselburg. Geschichte und heutige Verwendung. In: Eifelverein (publ.): Jahrbuch des Kreises Daun 1976. Erzählungen, Geschichten und aktuelle Daten. Weiss, Monschau 1977, ISSN 0720-6976, pp. 19ff.
- Matthias Kordel: Kasselburg. In: Die schönsten Schlösser und Burgen in der Eifel. 1st edition, Wartberg, Gudensberg-Gleichen, 1999, ISBN 3861344823, pp. 32–33.
- Michael Losse: Kasselburg. Beitrag in: Hohe Eifel und Ahrtal (Joachim Zeune (ed.)). Konrad Theiss Verlag, Stuttgart, 2003. pp. 74–77 ISBN 3806217750.
