= Gerolstein =

- Town
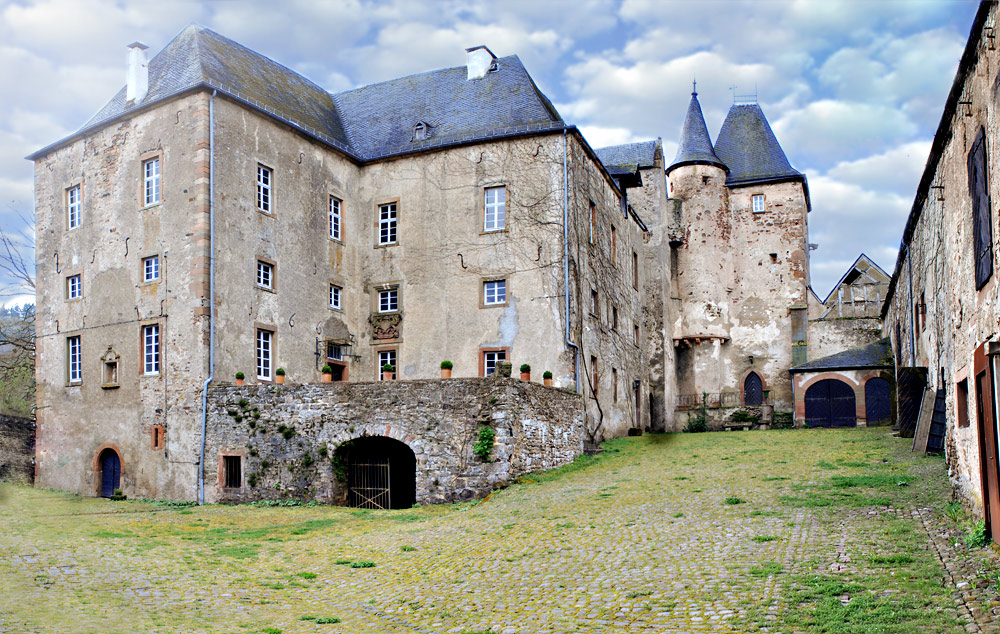
- Lissingen Castle

- Coat of arms

- Location of Gerolstein within Vulkaneifel district
- Interactive map of Gerolstein
- Location within Germany Location within Rhineland-Palatinate
- Coordinates: 50°13′26″N 6°39′41″E
- Country: Germany
- State: Rhineland-Palatinate
- District: Vulkaneifel
- Municipal assoc.: Gerolstein

Government
  - Mayor (2019–24): Uwe Schneider (SPD)

Area
  - Total: 64.43 km^{2} (24.88 sq mi)
- Elevation: 358 m (1,175 ft)

Population (2025-12-31)
  - Total: 7,198
  - Density: 111.7/km^{2} (289.3/sq mi)
- Time zone: UTC+01:00 (CET)
  - Summer (DST): UTC+02:00 (CEST)
- Postal codes: 54568
- Dialling codes: 06591
- Vehicle registration: DAU
- Website: www.gerolsteiner-land.de

Gerolstein (German pronunciation: [ˈɡeːʁɔlˌʃtaɪn]) is a town in the Vulkaneifel district of Rhineland-Palatinate, Germany. Gerolstein is a local municipality of the Verbandsgemeinde Gerolstein. It has been approved as a Luftkurort (spa town).

== History ==
As early as the Stone Age, there is evidence of human habitation in the Buchenloch, a nearby cave. In the Bronze Age the Dietzenley was used by the Celts as a refuge castle. In Roman times a temple and dwellings were known to have existed, and remnants of them have been preserved.

One form of the name Gerolstein first appeared in connection with the building of the Löwenburg in 1115, which was then named the Burg Gerhardstein.

Town rights were granted to Gerolstein in 1336. In 1691, the town was almost completely destroyed when it was liberated from French occupation by troops from the Duchy of Jülich. After reconstruction, a devastating fire burnt down the town in 1708, and again in 1784. In the 1801 Treaty of Lunéville, Gerolstein, along with all of the area on the left bank of the Rhine river, was given to France, and wasn't returned to German control until 1815. As a landholder, Count Sternberg-Manderscheid acquired the holdings formerly belonging to the monasteries at Weissenau and Schussenried in Upper Swabia in the 1803 Reichsdeputationshauptschluss, among other things, to offset his loss of Blankenheim, Jünkerath, Gerolstein and Dollendorf. It is known that water—from the spring that once was used by the Celts and the Romans—was bottled and sold beginning in 1724. This still forms the basis for today's mineral water industry in Gerolstein. Late in the Second World War, in both 1944 and 1945, Gerolstein's status as a railway junction-town brought Allied air raids down on the town, and 80% of it was destroyed. Town rights were granted Gerolstein once again in 1953.

=== Bewingen ===
Bewingen is Gerolstein's northernmost outlying centre, or Stadtteil, located three kilometres (about 1.86 miles) from the town center. Here, the Kyll river flows in a great arc around the mighty dolomite and basalt massif that juts out from the west, eastwards. The valley narrows and there is only enough room for the railway line, a field road, and the river itself. The road finds its way to Gerolstein over the Bewinger Höhe (heights), thus shortening the way to the nearby middle centre. The local lay of the land was brought about by volcanic activity that created two volcanic peaks—the Kasselburg massif, with the Burlich and the Hahn ("Cock") on the Kyll river's west bank, and the Rockeskyller Kopf on the east—whose volcanic minerals and deposits of lava, ash, and cinders during the Quaternary period narrowed the river valley.

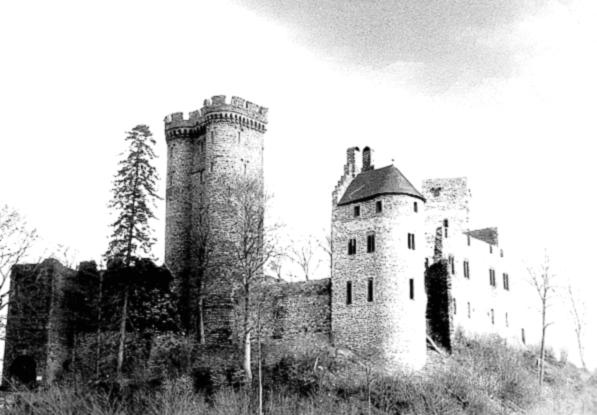
Kasselburg ruins at Pelm (near Gerolstein)

The place-name ending —ingen points to early Frankish settlement. Bewingen was first mentioned in a document in 1218 as a holding of the church and monastery of Niederehe. From that mention it is known that the Brothers Theoderich, Alexander, and Albero, from Castle Kerpen, established an endowment for the Premonstratensian nuns in the years between 1162 and 1175. The next documentary mention came in 1282, when "Gerhard VI of Blankenheim" acquired the land, as well as Steffeln, Niederbettingen, and Bewingen. In the Middle Ages, the lords at Kasselburg (a castle in Pelm) and those at Castle Gerhardstein (Gerolstein) held lands and tithing rights in the village. In the time of French rule, beginning in 1794, Bewingen was assigned to the Mairie ("Mayoralty") of Rockeskyll, and the village remained within the Bürgermeisterei (also "Mayoralty") of Rockeskyll up to Prussian times. The formerly self-administering municipality of Bewingen was amalgamated with the town of Gerolstein in 1969.

One of the oldest buildings is the small chapel consecrated to Saint Brice, which underwent repairs in 1744 and 1745. Its Late Gothic choir suggests that there was an earlier church here, built perhaps around 1500.

=== Büscheich-Niedereich ===
Büscheich-Niedereich lies roughly 5 km from the town centre. In 1352, Büscheich had its first documentary mention; Niedereich's first documentary mention did not come until 1398.

In 1501, the hereditary estate of Eich (Niedereich) belonged to the County of Gerolstein. On 13 May 1661, the hereditary estate was divided into Niedereich and Obereich.

When the French occupied the Eifel in the 18th century, the Counts lost all their holdings. After the French were driven out, the Eifel became Prussian. In 1815, the Prussian government changed Obereich's name to Büscheich.

== Politics ==
Gerolstein is the seat of the Verbandsgemeinde of Gerolstein, to which the municipalities of Berlingen, Birresborn, Densborn, Duppach, Hohenfels-Essingen, Kalenborn-Scheuern, Kopp, Mürlenbach, Neroth, Pelm, Rockeskyll, and Salm belong.

=== Constituent communities ===
Gerolstein's subdivisions, besides the main town (also called Gerolstein), are Bewingen, Büscheich-Niedereich, Gees, Hinterhausen, Lissingen, Michelbach, Müllenborn, Oos, and Roth.

=== Town council ===
The council is made up of 24 members elected by proportional representation at municipal elections, with the mayor as chairman.

Seats in the council:

Year of Election	SPD	CDU	Alliance 90/The Greens	FDP	ÖDP	FWG	WG Sturm im Wald e.V	BUV	Total
2024	7	15	3	2	1	9	3	-	40 Seats
2014	6	10	3	1	-	3	-	1	24 Seats
2009	6	11	2	1	-	–	-	4	24 Seats
2004	5	13	–	1	-	2	-	3	24 Seats

- FWG = Freie Wählergemeinschaft Landkreis Vulkaneifel e.V.
- BUV = BürgerUnion Vulkaneifel e.V.

=== Mayor ===
Gerolstein's mayor is chosen every five years in a direct vote. The current officeholder is Uwe Schneider (SPD).

=== Amalgamations ===
On 7 June 1969, the municipalities of Bewingen, Hinterhausen, and Lissingen were amalgamated with Gerolstein. Büscheich, Gees, Michelbach, Müllenborn, Oos, and Roth were amalgamated on 1 December 1972.

=== Coat of arms ===
The town's coat of arms consists of a lion rampant sable (black and standing on the left hind foot) armed and langued gules (red tongue, teeth, and claws viable) surmounted at the shoulder by a label of five points of the last.

The town's arms are those formerly borne by the Counts of Gerolstein-Blankenheim, the former landholders, and are from as early as 1567 when they appeared in a seal used by the town's Schöffen (roughly "lay jurists"). The town has borne these arms since about 1890, but no official approval to do so is known to have been issued.

=== Town partnerships ===
Gerolstein has fostered partnerships with the following places:

- Digoin, Saône-et-Loire, France, since 1987
- Gilze en Rijen, North Brabant, Netherlands

== Transportation and economy ==
=== Transport ===
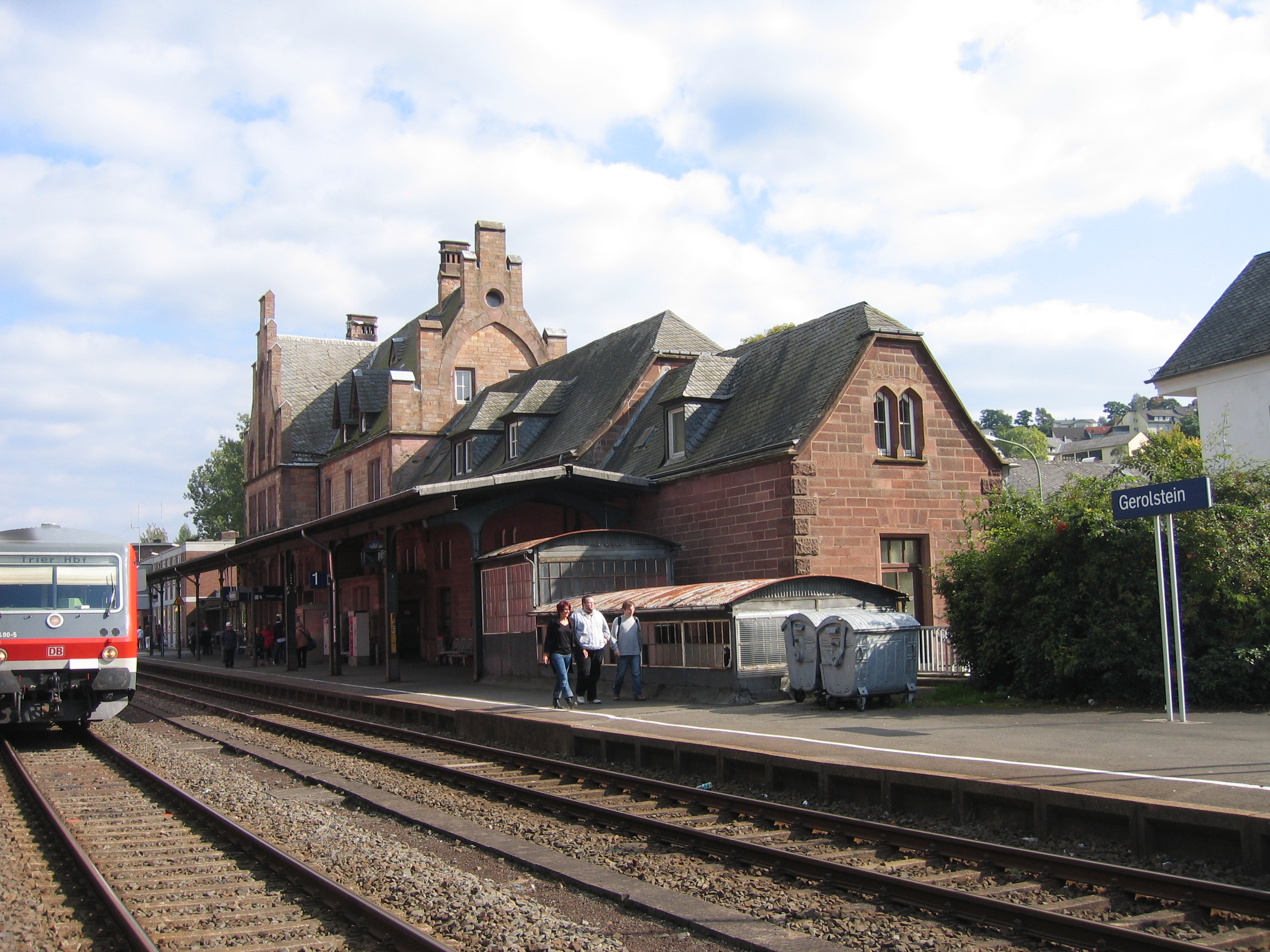
Gerolstein, Bahnhofstraße 4: Gothic Revival railway station

Gerolstein station lies on the Eifelbahn railway line (Cologne–Euskirchen–Gerolstein–Trier) and has the following local passenger services:

- the Eifel-Mosel-Express (Cologne–Euskirchen–Gerolstein–Trier);
- the Eifel-Express (Cologne–Euskirchen–Gerolstein with connection to Trier);
- the Eifel-Bahn (Cologne–Euskirchen–Kall, and at peak times on to Gerolstein);
- the Eifelbahn (Gerolstein–Trier).

In Gerolstein, the historical Eifelquerbahn (Cross Eifel Railway) branches off, leading by way of Daun to Kaisersesch and on to Andernach, as does the Westeifelbahn, leading by way of Prüm to Sankt Vith (until 1918 a part of the German Empire, now part of Belgium).

For all local public transport three tariff systems apply: the Verkehrsverbund Region Trier (VRT), the Verkehrsverbund Rhein-Sieg, and for journeys crossing tariff zones, the NRW-Tarif.

=== Established businesses ===
The mineral-water firm Gerolsteiner Brunnen has its headquarters in Gerolstein.

=== Bundeswehr ===
The German army (Bundeswehr) Eifel barracks (Eifelkaserne) house the 281st headquarters support battalion (Führungsunterstützungsbataillon 281).

== Culture and sightseeing ==
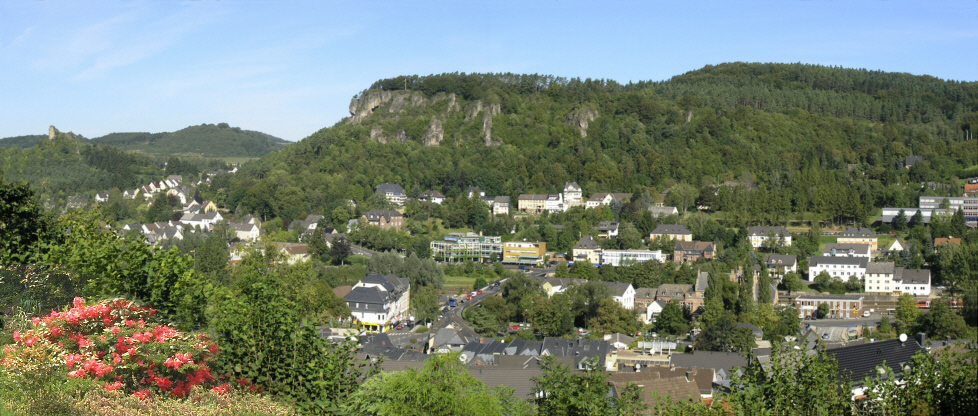
Gerolstein with Munterley, Auberg and Rothe Hecke

In addition to the attractions listed below, other things to see in and around Gerolstein include the dried-up maar called Papenkaule; the Buchenloch, a 36-metre-long karst cave that served as a dwelling for Stone Age people; the Mühlsteinhöhlen ("millstone caves") or Eishöhlen ("ice caves") near Roth; a natural history museum; and a district local history museum. In walking distance is the Gerolsteiner Dolomiten, a Devonian limestone reef formed by extinct Rugosa, Tabulata, and Stromatoporoids, comprising the Hustley, the Munterley, and the Auber, which dominate the surrounding landscape, looming 100 meters above the valley.

=== Buildings ===
==== Main town ====
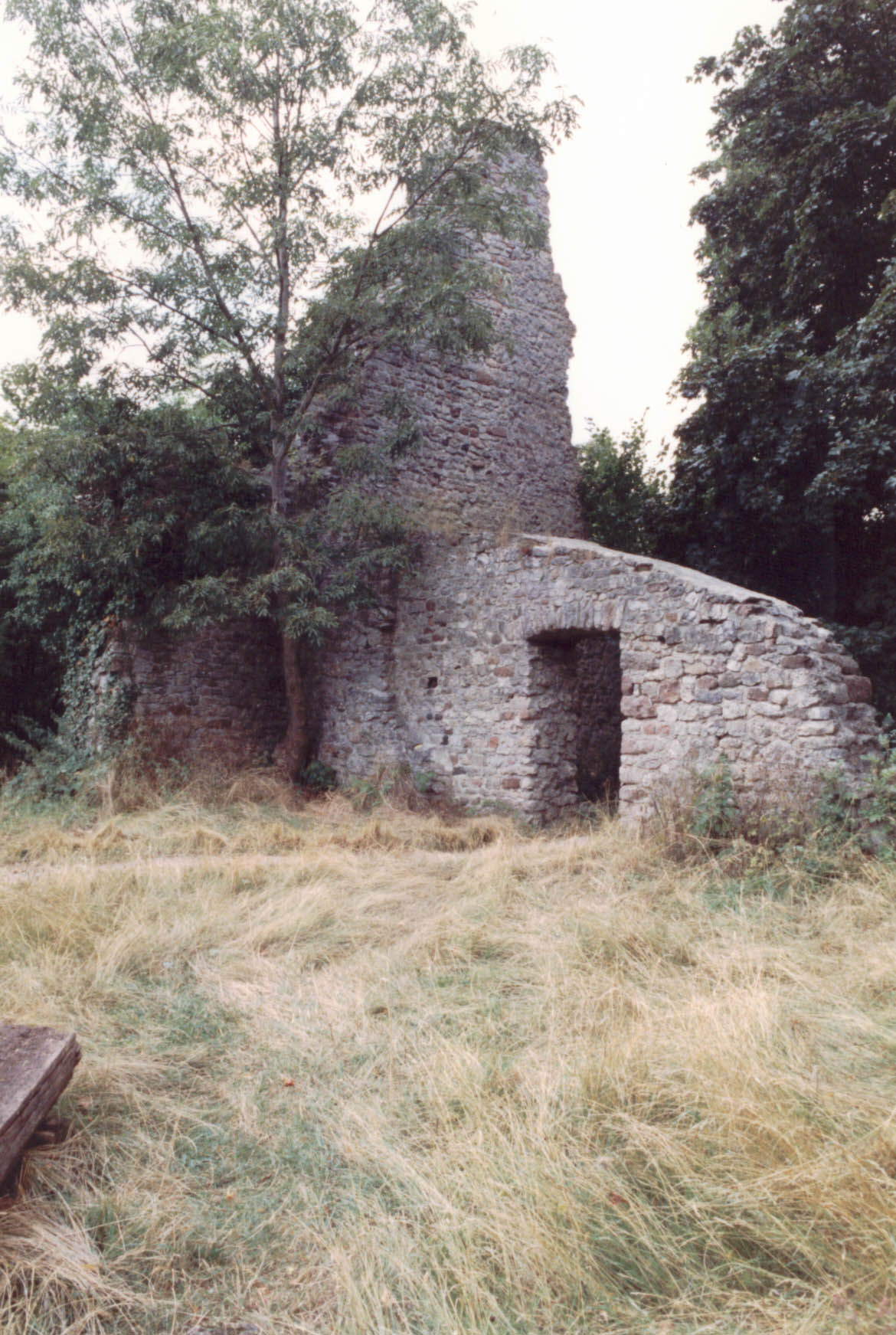
Gerolstein, monumental zone, Gerolstein castle ruins

- Gerolstein castle (Löwenburg) ruins, Bergstraße, monumental zone, castle founded in the earlier half of the 14th century by Gerhard VI of Blankenburg and destroyed in 1691, the defensive wall in the outer bailey preserved, remnants of living quarters preserved in the main stronghold.
- Evangelical Church of the Redeemer, Sarresdorfer Straße 17, cruciform central-plan building after Italo-Byzantine models, 1911–1913, complex with treed lot and fence dating from the time of building, rectory, Sarresdorfer Straße 15 a, former parish house (?), Sarresdorfer Straße 19 a, Classicist hipped-roof building.
- Saint Anne’s Catholic Parish Church (Pfarrkirche St. Anna), aisleless church from 1811, expanded in 1884 and 1948, complex with rectory, possibly from about 1800.
- Town fortifications, Am Stadtturm 1, Hauptstraße 41, 75, Mühlenstraße 19 (monumental zone), section of 14th-century town wall between a jutting half-round tower (integrated into Hauptstraße 75) and a great tower (Am Stadtturm 1), a further section of town wall with gate remnants (Mühlenstraße 19) and a pillar-shaped town wall remnant (Hauptstraße 41).
- Bahnhofstraße 4 – Gothic Revival railway station, 1870, expanded after the Second World War.
- Bahnhofstraße 17 – stately house, apparently from 1902.
- Brunnenstraße 11, 13 – factory building, façade with colourful wall tiles and glass bricks, date unknown.
- Graf-Karl-Ferdinand-Straße – so-called Burgkreuz ("Castle Cross"), a niche cross possibly from the 16th or 17th century.
- Near Hauptstraße 10 – Heiligenhäuschen (a small, shrine-like structure consecrated to a saint or saints), Baroque, sandstone, from 1771 and 1784.
- Near Hauptstraße 42 – a Descent from the Cross group, sandstone, apparently from 1838.
- Hauptstraße 59, 61 – houses, one at 59 from 1903 but essentially older, Late Gothic Revival entrance, one at 61 from 1747 and 1822.
- Hauptstraße 76 – house used as dwelling and inn with half-hipped gables, date unclear.
- Heiligensteinstraße 5/7 – pair of semi-detached houses with half-hipped gables, lava stone façade, about 1900.
- Kyllweg – warriors’ memorial, 1914–1918.
- Lindenstraße (no number) – former Oos wireworks, founded in 1882, no. 43a director's villa (?), plaster building with corner tower.
- Lindenstraße 6 – former railway works building, representative quarry stone building, apparently from 1890.
- Mühlenstraße 19 – timber-frame house, partly solid.
- Sarresdorfer Straße/Am Auberg – Jewish graveyard (monumental zone), on the area of the general cemetery, opened in 1892, about 15 gravestones, oldest from 1896.
- Sarresdorfer Straße – former Roman villa of Sarabodis, remnants of the Roman estate at Sarresdorf, donated in 762 by Pepin to Prüm Abbey, since 1913 "Museum Sarabodis".
- Sarresdorfer Straße 15 a – Evangelical rectory
- Sarresdorfer Straße 19 a – Evangelical parish house (?)
- Sarresdorfer Straße 26 – former parish house, now district local history museum, Renaissance building from about 1550, Baroque red-sandstone shaft cross from the latter half of the 18th century.
- Unter den Dolomiten – forester's office with half-hipped gables, Reform architecture, side building timber-frame, partly solid, from about 1920.
- At the Büschkapelle – warriors’ memorial 1848, 1864, 1866, 1870–1871, pedestal, obelisk and cross.
- Büschkapelle, southeast of town in the woods, Gothic Revival chapel, quarry stone, 1904.
- So-called Fruhnertskreuz, north of town on the edge of the town forest, sandstone shaft cross from 1796 (1726?).

==== Bewingen ====
- Saint Brice's Catholic Church (branch church; Filialkirche St. Brictius), Bewinger Straße, Late Gothic quire, Gothic Revival nave, 17th century.
- Bewinger Straße 40 – estate along street from 1914, old cobbles in yard.

==== Büscheich ====
- Saint John the Baptist’s Catholic Church (branch church; Filialkirche St. Johannes Baptista), Büscheicher Straße, aisleless church, apparently from 1670, west portal 19th century, possibly expanded after 1945.
- Niedereicher Straße 6 – former school, one-floor plaster building, apparently from 1906.
- Zur Dietzenley 2 – house from 1787.
- Zur Dietzenley 3 – Quereinhaus (a combination residential and commercial house divided for these two purposes down the middle, perpendicular to the street) from 1876.
- Niedereich 18 – house with a large chimney, from 1804.
- So-called Davitzkreuz, northwest of the village in the woods, Baroque shaft cross from 1764.

==== Gees ====
- Saint Nicholas’s Catholic Church (branch church; Filialkirche St. Nikolaus), quarry stone aisleless church, 1904, former quire tower, to the south a sandstone Baroque shaft cross from 1819.
- At Am Bungert 1 – one-floor bakehouse from 1807.
- Geeser Straße 29 – corner estate from 1860.
- Geeser Straße 31 – Late Baroque plaster building, about 1800.
- Geeser Straße 40 – triaxial plaster building from 1809 (?).
- Geeser Straße 48 – house of a former estate complex, date unknown.
- Geeser Straße 63 – Quereinhaus, late 18th century, yard partly cobbled.
- So-called Jardin-Kreuz, northwest of the village on a field path, Baroque shaft cross from 1768.

==== Hinterhausen ====
- Saint Lambert's Catholic Church (branch church, Filialkirche St. Lambert), Hinterhausener Straße, biaxial aisleless church, 1867.
- Village centre, Hinterhausener Straße (monumental zone), old village centre with branch chapel and estate complexes on the ring-shaped street, 19th century, distinctive village appearance, distinctive street layout.
- Hinterhausener Straße 14 – estate complex, house from 1864, commercial building.

==== Lissingen ====
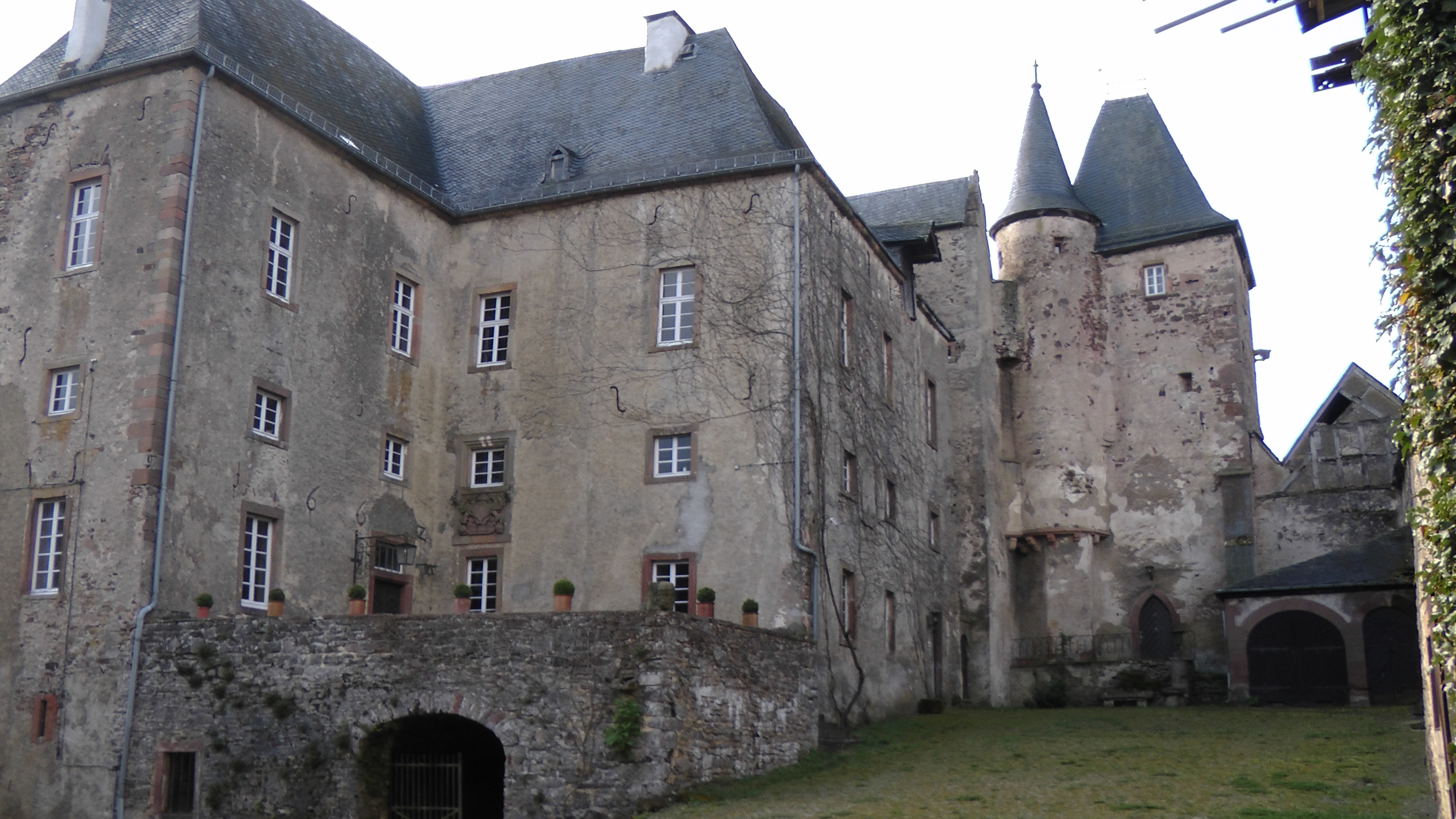
Lissingen castle

- Burg Lissingen (castle), Burgstraße/Klosterstraße (monumental zone), stately group of buildings on the Kyll consisting of upper and lower castle, the mediaeval building steadily expanded in the 14th to 17th centuries, commercial building on site of old ring wall, between upper and lower castle a four-floor tower from the 14th century, outer gate at the southwest corner of the upper castle from 1624, in the lower castle a dwelling building, essentially Gothic, park with garden house from 1793, complex includes Klosterstraße 1: estate along street, latter half of the 19th century; Klosterstraße 3: possibly a former bursary, Baroque hipped mansard roof.
- Saint Margaret's Catholic Church (branch church; Filialkirche St. Margaretha), five-axis aisleless church, 1932.

==== Michelbach ====
- Saint Stephen’s Catholic Church (branch church; Filialkirche St. Stephan), triaxial aisleless church, 1781.
- Near Birresborner Straße 22 – wayside cross, niche cross from earlier half of the 17th century.
- Michelbacher Straße 2 – triaxial house, apparently a former curate's house, 18th century.
- Michelbacher Straße 17 – house, 1872, oven porch.

==== Müllenborn ====
- Saint Anthony's Catholic Church (branch church; Filialkirche St. Antonius), Müllenborner Straße 39, biaxial aisleless church, 1682.
- Amselweg 9 – former railway station on the Gerolstein-Pronsfeld line, quarry stone, apparently from 1883.
- Fricksbachstraße/corner of Auf der Held – wayside cross, beam cross from 1794.
- Müllenborner Straße 32 – representative building with half-hipped gables from 1820.
- Müllenborner Straße 34 – six-axis Classicist house, the latter half of the 19th century.
- Müllenborner Straße 36 – stately Baroque building with mansard roof, apparently from 1804.
- Müllenborner Straße 38 – Baroque half house from 1786.
- Near Müllenborner Straße 73 – wayside cross, sandstone shaft cross from 1778.
- Müllenborner Straße 89/91 – small estate complex, Baroque house from 1777, stable-barn with tower and crow-stepped gable, apparently 1482/1550.
- Müllenborner Straße 103 – estate complex house, remodelled in the 19th century.
- Müllenborner Straße 107 – estate complex.
- Müllenborner Straße/corner of Amselweg – wayside cross, Gothic Revival from 1914.

==== Oos ====
- Saint Roch’s Catholic Church (branch church; Filialkirche St. Rochus), Ooser Straße 18, two-naved Romanesque Revival building, 1906-1907, Romanesque west tower.
- Wayside cross, west of the village on the road to Büdesheim, Crucifixion Bildstock from 1619.

==== Roth ====
- Saint Anthony’s Catholic Church (branch church; Filialkirche St. Antonius), An der Kirche 10, Gothic Revival aisleless church, 1892, sandstone shaft cross from the 1680s (last digit unclear).
- An der Kirche 4 – Quereinhaus from 1774, oven porch.
- An der Kirche 12 – former parish estate built of basalt, possibly latter half of the 19th century, commercial building, yard.
- Across the street from Rother Straße 40 – wayside cross, shaft cross, possibly earlier half of the 19th century.

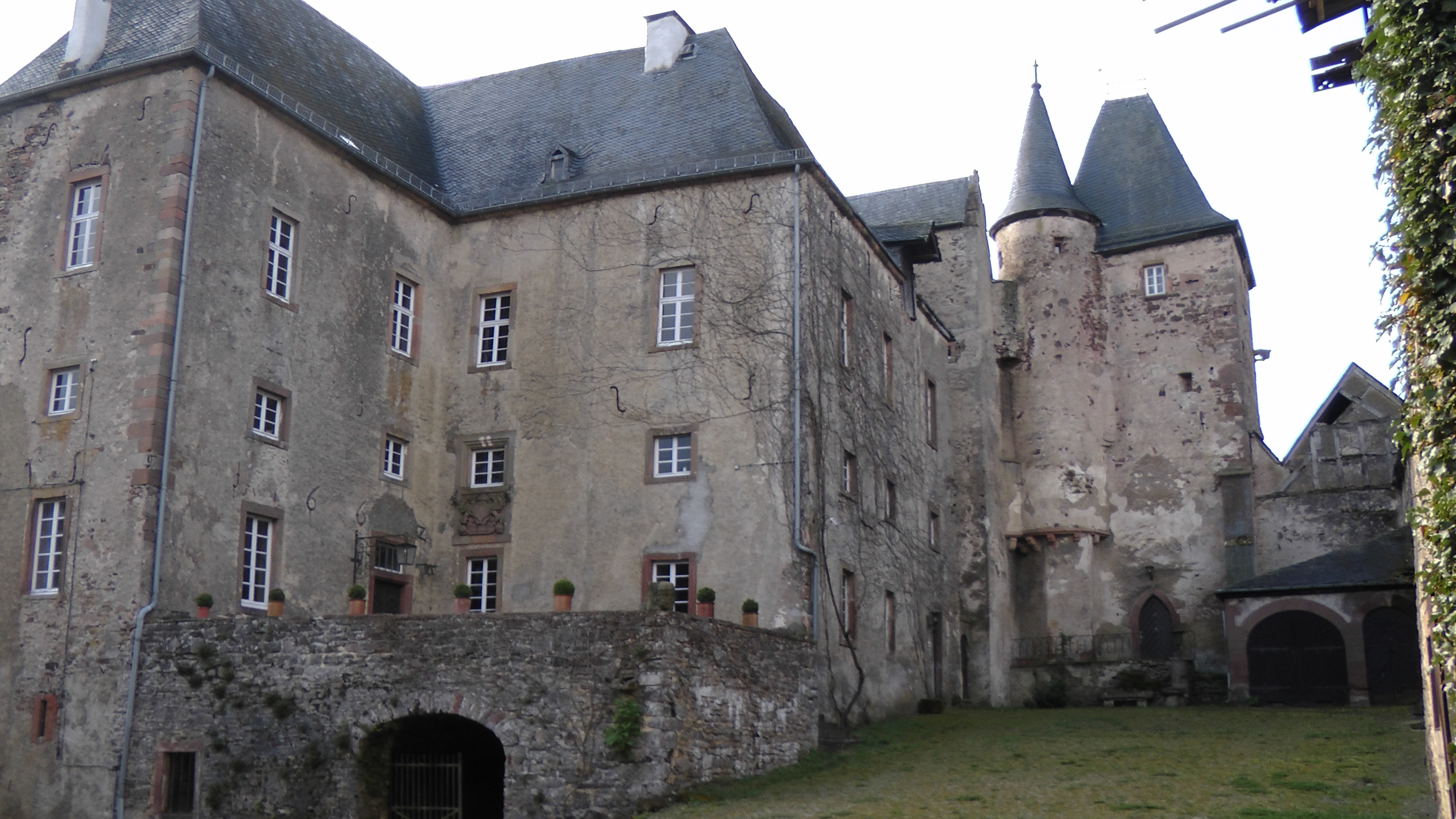
Castle of Lissingen

=== Lissingen Castle ===
On the outskirts of the outlying community of Lissingen stands the formerly moated Lissingen Castle, near the Kyll. The oldest parts of the building date to 1280, although the castle had already been mentioned in documents by 1212. Unlike most castles in the Eifel, it was not destroyed. In 1559, it was divided into an upper and lower castle. The lower castle is used as an event and cultural venue.

=== Erlöserkirche ===
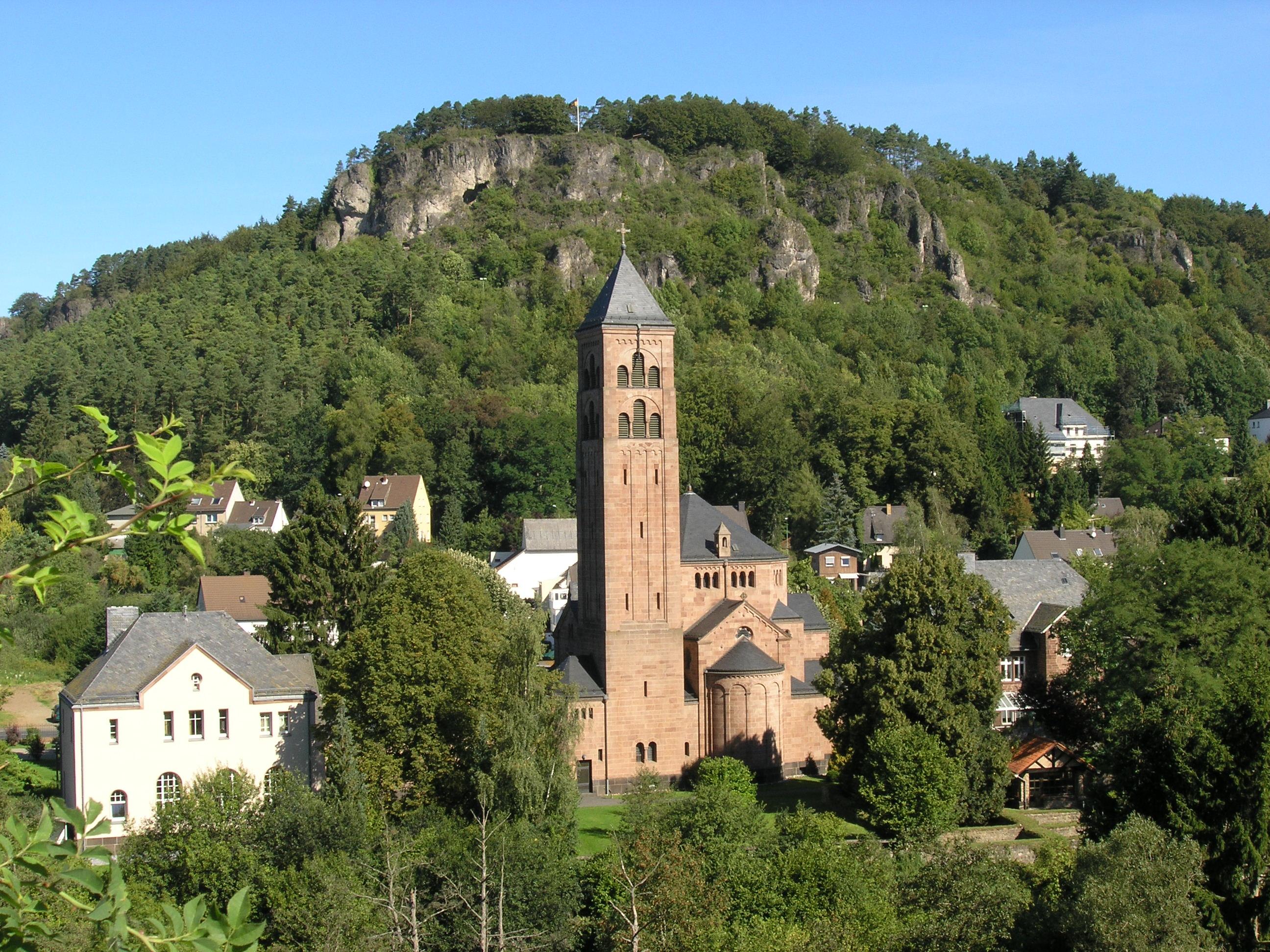
Gerolstein, Sarresdorfer Straße 17: Evangelical Church of the Redeemer (Erlöserkirche) with Munterley

The Evangelical Erlöserkirche ("Church of the Redeemer") was built between 1907 and 1913 by Franz Schwechten (the same architect who designed, among other things, Berlin’s Kaiser Wilhelm Memorial Church), and was consecrated on 15 October 1913. The interior is decorated with broad gold mosaics, round arches, and a commanding cupola.

=== Villa Sarabodis ===
Villa Sarabodis is the name given the ruins of a Roman country house – villa rustica – which were unearthed in the course of preparatory work for building the Church of the Redeemer in 1907 and have been dated to the first century AD. The Kirchenbauverein Berlin ("Berlin Church-Building Association"), which built the Church of the Redeemer, excavated and preserved the finds. The foundation and a hypocaust can now be viewed in a protective building.

=== Juddekirchhof ===
The Juddekirchhof, as it is known locally, is a Celtic-Roman worship site. It lies above Gerolstein on the Hustley, a part of the Gerolsteiner Dolomiten.

The Roman Marcus Victorius Pellentius had this temple complex built in AD 124. The remains of the walls measure roughly 63 by 46 metres, within which the foundations of many buildings, among which are two temples, are preserved. One temple was dedicated to Hercules while the other was dedicated to the Celtic goddess Caiva. In 1927 and 1928, remains of the temple complex were excavated.

== Famous people ==
- Maria Reese (1889–1958), writer, journalist and politician
- Rolf Huisgen (1920– 2020), chemist
- Alois Mertes (1921–1985), politician and state minister in the foreign office
- Matthias Krings (1943– ), moderator
- Michael Fisch (1964– ), writer
- Johannes Fröhlinger (1985– ), competition cyclist
- Christian Vietoris (1989– ), auto racer
- Rudi Gores (1957– ), footballer and trainer

== In popular culture ==
Gerolstein is also the name of a fictional country in Central Europe that is the subject of Jacques Offenbach's opéra bouffe la Grande-Duchesse de Gérolstein (The Grand Duchess of Gerolstein).

In Les Mystères de Paris, by French author Eugene Sue, the main protagonist, Rodolph, is the Grand Duke of Gerolstein.
