= Pelm =

- Municipality
- Coat of arms

- Location of Pelm within Vulkaneifel district
- Interactive map of Pelm
- Location within Germany Location within Rhineland-Palatinate
- Coordinates: 50°14′01″N 6°41′28″E
- Country: Germany
- State: Rhineland-Palatinate
- District: Vulkaneifel
- Municipal assoc.: Gerolstein

Government
  - Mayor (2019–24): Leo Meeth

Area
  - Total: 10.06 km^{2} (3.88 sq mi)
- Elevation: 370 m (1,210 ft)

Population (2025-12-31)
  - Total: 926
  - Density: 92.0/km^{2} (238/sq mi)
- Time zone: UTC+01:00 (CET)
  - Summer (DST): UTC+02:00 (CEST)
- Postal codes: 54570
- Dialling codes: 06591
- Vehicle registration: DAU
- Website: www.pelm.de

Pelm is an Ortsgemeinde – a municipality belonging to a Verbandsgemeinde, a kind of collective municipality – in the Vulkaneifel district in Rhineland-Palatinate, Germany. It belongs to the Verbandsgemeinde of Gerolstein, whose seat is in the like-named town.

== Geography ==
=== Location ===
The municipality lies on the river Kyll in the Vulkaneifel, a part of the Eifel known for its volcanic history, geographical and geological features, and even ongoing activity today, including gases that sometimes well up from the earth.

=== Neighbouring municipalities ===
Pelm's neighbours are Gerolstein, Rockeskyll, Berlingen, Dohm-Lammersdorf and Hohenfels-Essingen.

== History ==
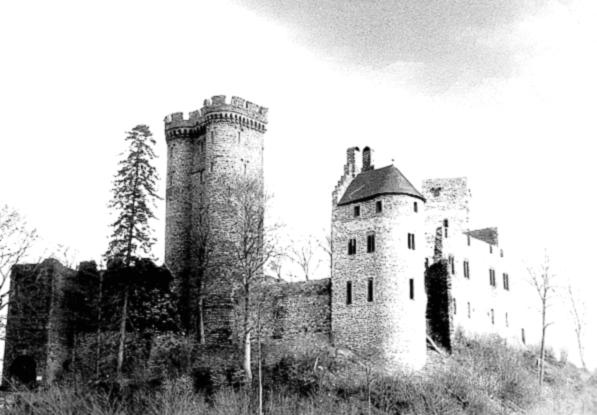
Ruins of the Kasselburg

Pelm is notable for its connection with ancient history.

Unearthed to the west of the village was a Gallo-Roman sanctuary. It had already been widely destroyed by graverobbers by the time a systematic investigation was done in 1928. More recently, newer information was brought to light by a dig undertaken in 1986 by the Trier Rhenish State Museum. The trapezoidal wall that once bounded the hallowed grounds, whose greatest length is 65 m and whose greatest breadth is 42 m, was built of limestone. Inside is a Gallo-Roman temple with a cella and a passageway in which a limestone tablet was found as early as 1833 inscribed with a dedication to the goddess Caiva. The tablet mentions that a man named Marcus Victorius Polentius granted an endowment of 100,000 sestertii for the temple to Caiva to be built. This inscription has been dated to AD 124.

There were two other temples on the grounds. At one, a fragmentary red sandstone club, likely from a statue of Hercules, was found in 1986. A torso from such a statue was unearthed in 1834, but has since been lost. Other statuary has been found representing Mercury and Venus, for instance.

Coins, too, have been found, from a quinarius minted in Africa in 47 or 46 BC to various coins struck about AD 400. One find, a fibula, dates from early La Tène times.

In the Middle Ages, the village was held by the House of Kasselburg, whose castle seat was in the village. It gave the noble family its name, and is still known today as the Kasselburg.

On 18 May 1897, Pelm was the site of a railway disaster when a troop train crashed into some uncoupled rolling stock causing seven of the train's coaches to derail. In the accident, ensuing chaos and fire, ten men – nine military personnel and one civilian – were killed. Many more were wounded.

== Politics ==
=== Municipal council ===
The council is made up of 16 council members, who were elected by proportional representation at the municipal election held on 7 June 2009, and the honorary mayor as chairman.

The municipal election held on 7 June 2009 yielded the following results:

Year	CDU	FWG	Total
2009	4	12	16 seats
2004	6	10	16 seats

=== Mayor ===
Pelm's mayor is Leo Meeth.

=== Coat of arms ===
The German blazon reads: Gespalten von Grün und Silber, über einem von Silber und Blau gespaltenen Wellenbalken zwei goldene Zinnentürme, eine goldene Zinnenmauer flankierend, Tor und Fenster betagleuchtet, hinten ein rotes Vortragkreuz.

The municipality's arms might in English heraldic language be described thus: Per pale vert a fess wavy abased argent above which a wall flanked by two towers all embattled Or, gate and windows sable, and argent a fess wavy abased conjoined as one to the other azure issuant from which a processional cross gules.

The 1988 Vulkaneifel Yearbook shows different arms for Pelm with the tower-flanked gatehouse as the only charge, issuant from base. The field tinctures was different, too, the gatehouse still being in Or (gold), but the field in sable (black). The composition on the sinister (armsbearer's left, viewer's right) side did not appear at all.

Nonetheless, in both forms of the arms, the gatehouse represents the local mediaeval landmark, the Kasselburg (castle).

== Culture and sightseeing ==
Buildings:

- Saint Willibrord's Catholic Church (branch church; Filialkirche St. Willibrord), Hauptstraße – Romanesque west tower, nave from 1746, expanded in 1965.
- Bahnhofstraße 14 – Quereinhaus (a combination residential and commercial house divided for these two purposes down the middle, perpendicularly to the street) from 1878.
- Bahnhofstraße 1 – small Baroque Quereinhaus (?).
- Gerolsteiner Straße 6 – building with half-hipped roof, about 1800.
- Gerolsteiner Straße 7 – two-floor solid building with small windows.
- Before Hauptstraße 2 – warriors’ memorial 1914-1918, crucifix 1850, on base built in 1919.
- Across the street from Hauptstraße 8 – wayside cross, red sandstone shaft cross from the earlier half of the 18th century.
- Hauptstraße 18 – stately house from an old estate along the street, early 19th century.
- Hauptstraße 19 – small Quereinhaus apparently from 1742, Baroque entrance, appearance largely 19th century.
- Between Hauptstraße 19 and 23 – wayside cross, red sandstone beam cross from 1762.
- Hauptstraße 46 – Quereinhaus about 1800 (?), Classicist doorframe, late 19th century.
- Memorial, north of the village on the railway right-of-way – to those who lost their lives in the accident on 18 May 1897, possibly from shortly thereafter.
- Former Gerolstein railway works yard, southwest of the village on the way to Gerolstein (Kasselburger Weg) – monumental zone, roundhouse, depot/administration building/workshop, 1928-1930, rebuilt in 1949/1950 after wartime destruction.
- Heiligenhäuschen (a small, shrinelike structure consecrated to a saint or saints), south of the village on the road from Gees to Gerolstein – red sandstone from 1768.
- Kasselburg – monumental zone, castle founded in the 12th century, among Eifel castles one of the stateliest and best preserved, parts from 13th, 14th and 15th centuries, eight-floor dwelling tower, three-floor hall building with built-on chapel, mid 14th century, keep, lower part of which is Romanesque, remnants of dwelling and commercial buildings, square gatetower, 15th century; complex includes broad area.
- So-called Judenkirchhof (“Jewish Churchyard”), west of the village on the hill – Gallo-Roman temple complex, AD 124.
