= Berlingen, Germany =

Berlingen
- Municipality
- Coat of arms

- Location of Berlingen within Vulkaneifel district
- Interactive map of Berlingen
- Location within Germany Location within Rhineland-Palatinate
- Coordinates: 50°14′27″N 6°43′14″E
- Country: Germany
- State: Rhineland-Palatinate
- District: Vulkaneifel
- Municipal assoc.: Gerolstein

Government
  - Mayor (2019–24): Erwin Schüller

Area
  - Total: 3.59 km^{2} (1.39 sq mi)
- Elevation: 470 m (1,540 ft)

Population (2025-12-31)
  - Total: 218
  - Density: 60.7/km^{2} (157/sq mi)
- Time zone: UTC+01:00 (CET)
  - Summer (DST): UTC+02:00 (CEST)
- Postal codes: 54570
- Dialling codes: 06591
- Vehicle registration: DAU
- Website: www.berlingen.de

Berlingen (German pronunciation: [ˈbɛʁlɪŋən]) is an Ortsgemeinde – a municipality belonging to a Verbandsgemeinde, a kind of collective municipality – in the Vulkaneifel district in Rhineland-Palatinate, Germany. It belongs to the Verbandsgemeinde of Gerolstein, whose seat is in the like-named town.

== Geography ==
=== Location ===
The municipality lies in the Vulkaneifel, a part of the Eifel known for its volcanic history, geographical and geological features, and even ongoing activity today, including gases that sometimes well up from the earth.

=== Neighbouring municipalities ===
Berlingen’s neighbours are Kirchweiler and Pelm.

== History ==
In 1201, Berlingen had its first documentary mention.

== Politics ==
=== Municipal council ===
The council is made up of 6 council members, who were elected by majority vote at the municipal election held on 7 June 2009, and the honorary mayor as chairman.

=== Coat of arms ===
The German blazon reads: In Silber eine eingeschobene rote Spitze, darin über einer erniedrigten silbernen Wellenleiste ein goldener Zinnenturm, vorn ein grüner Mühlstein, belegt mit drei goldenen Ähren, hinten ein grünes Buchenblatt.

The municipality’s arms might in English heraldic language be described thus: Argent a pile transposed gules surmounted in base by a fess wavy of the field, above which a tower embattled Or, in dexter chief a millstone vert surmounted by three ears of wheat radiating from the hole of the third, and in sinister chief a beechleaf palewise of the fourth.

The millstone refers to an old mill that was still intact as late as 1963, and the leaf refers to a 300-year-old beech tree on top of the Alter Voß (hill); It is Berlingen’s landmark. The wavy fess stands for the brook that runs through the village. The municipality’s website, however, does not explain the other charge, the tower, nor does it explain the division of the field.

== Culture and sightseeing ==
=== Buildings ===
- Saint Quirinus’s Catholic Church, Mühlenstraße 10, a basalt aisleless church from 1883
- In der Ramm 2 – house from 1808

=== Natural monuments ===
One point of interest is the 300-year-old Befreiungsbuche, or “Liberation Beech” on the Alter Voss (599 m above sea level). The surrounding Vulkaneifel countryside can be viewed.
