= Bundesstraße 257 =

Federal highway in Germany

B 257
- Bundesstraße 257
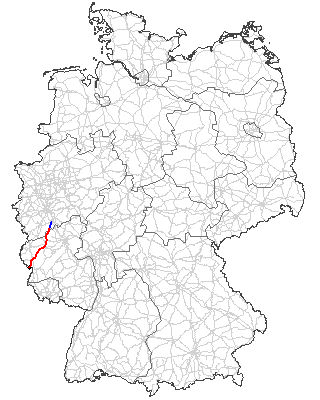

Route information
- Length: 120 km (75 mi)

Major junctions
- From: Grafschaft, Rhineland
- To: Echternacherbrück

Location
- Country: Germany
- States: North Rhine-Westphalia, Rhineland-Palatinate

Highway system
- Roads in Germany; Autobahns; List; Federal; List; State; E-roads

The Bundesstraße 257 is a federal highway in Germany which leads from the connection to the A 565 near the Kreuz Meckenheim in a south-westerly direction through the Eifel to the border with Luxembourg in Echternacherbrück.

== Course ==
Shortly after the Autobahnkreuz Meckenheim, the A 565 changes to the Bundesstraße 257 after the Gelsdorf junction (formerly AS Grafschaft). After a few kilometers over the foothills of the Ahreifel, it winds down into the Ahr valley. In the area of the Altenahr bypass, the B 267 branches off to Bad Neuenahr-Ahrweiler. Soon after the junction, the B 257 is led through three tunnels before it crosses the Ahr and the Lower Ahr Valley Railway shortly before Ahrbrück. It runs parallel to these two as far as Dümpelfeld, although the railway was completely shut down and dismantled from Ahrbrück. From Dümpelfeld, the B 257 follows a side valley of the Ahr to Adenau.

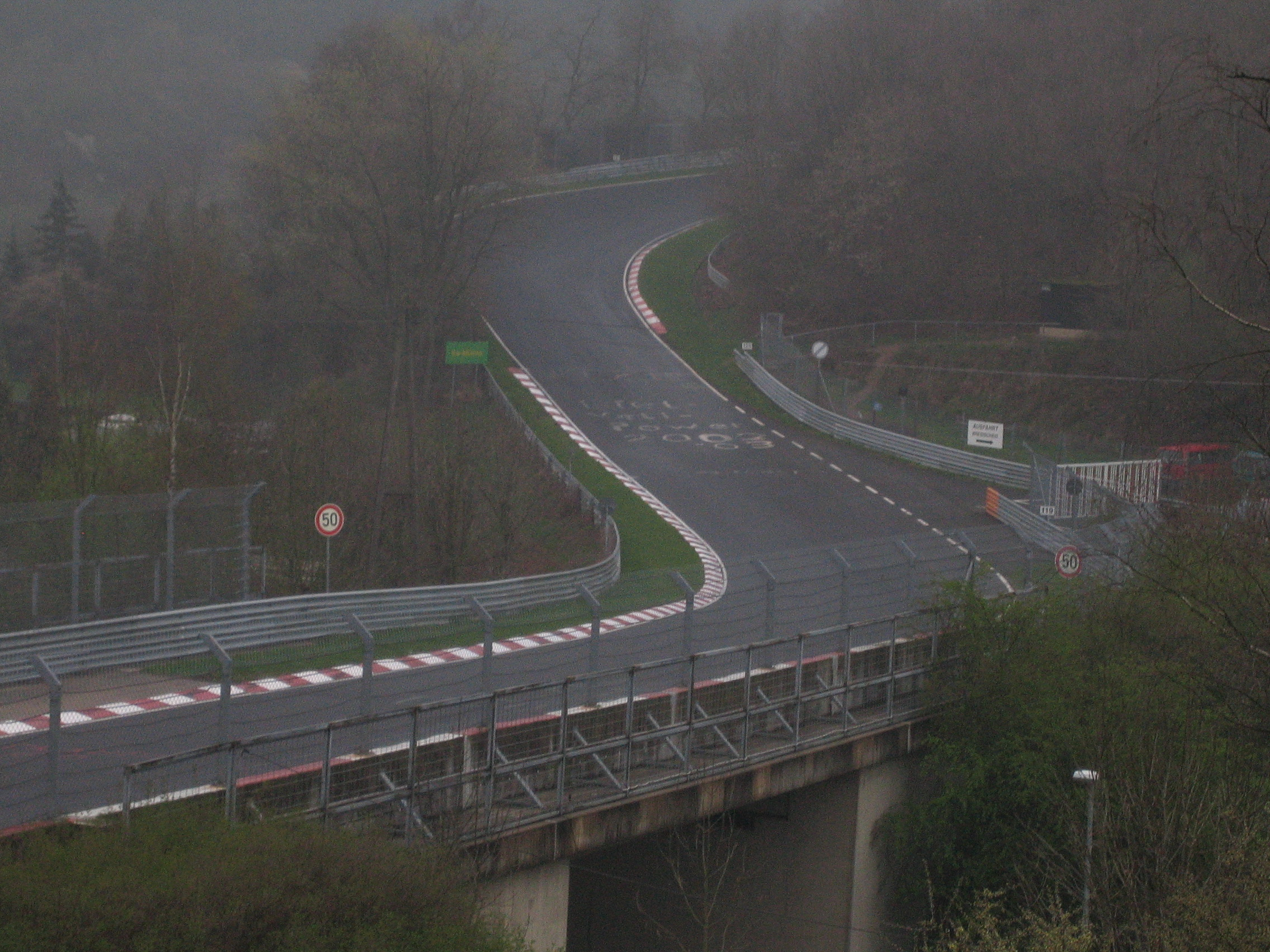
The Nordschleife section "Ex-Mühle" near Breidscheid crosses the Bundesstraße 257

Behind the Adenau quarter of Breidscheid, the Nordschleife of the Nürburgring crosses the B 257, so that it runs within the Green Hell until the second overpass behind Quiddelbach. Shortly afterwards the B 258 crosses west of the Grand Prix track of the Nürburgring. Now it goes downhill again, through the local community of Müllenbach to Kelberg, where the B 257 meets the B 410.

In Ulmen, the B 259 branches off to the southeast to the junction of the A 48 and on towards Cochem. The B 257 has been replaced by the federal motorway from here to the Daun junction of the A 1. It is continued in Daun. Now it goes on in a south-westerly direction, whereby the Volcanic Eifel merges into the softer landscape of the Bitburger Gutland.

At Bitburg, the B 257 runs for a few kilometers together with the B 51 in the direction of Trier and then branches off again to the southwest.

In Wolsfeld, which is known nationally for its hill climb, residents have been demanding a bypass for years because of the heavy traffic. This was included as an urgent requirement in the Federal Transport Infrastructure Plan and implemented within the framework of the 2 billion euro program to improve the transport infrastructure in the years 2005–2008. The bypass road was opened for traffic on 13 December 2008 by the Rhineland-Palatinate Transport Minister Hendrik Hering and Parliamentary State Secretary Karl Diller from the Federal Ministry of Finance.

Past Irrel, the B 257 now leads to Echternacherbrück, where it meets the B 418. This runs from here to Wasserbilligerbrück along the banks of the Sauer, which here forms the border between Germany and Luxembourg.

Across the Sauer lies Echternach, which is widely known for its dancing procession.
