= Adenauer Bach =

River in Germany

Location
- Country: Germany
- State: Rhineland-Palatinate
- District: Ahrweiler
- Reference no.: DE: 27186

Physical characteristics
- Source
  - location: South of Quiddelbach
  - coordinates: 50°20′34″N 6°56′06″E
  - elevation: ca. 533 m above sea level (NHN)
- Mouth
  - location: Near Dümpelfeld into the Ahr
  - coordinates: 50°26′42″N 6°56′05″E
  - elevation: ca. 209 m above sea level (NHN)
- Length: 15.719 km
- Basin size: 58.467 km²

Basin features
- Progression: Ahr→ Rhine→ North Sea
- Landmarks: Small towns: Adenau; Villages: Quiddelbach, Leimbach, Dümpelfeld

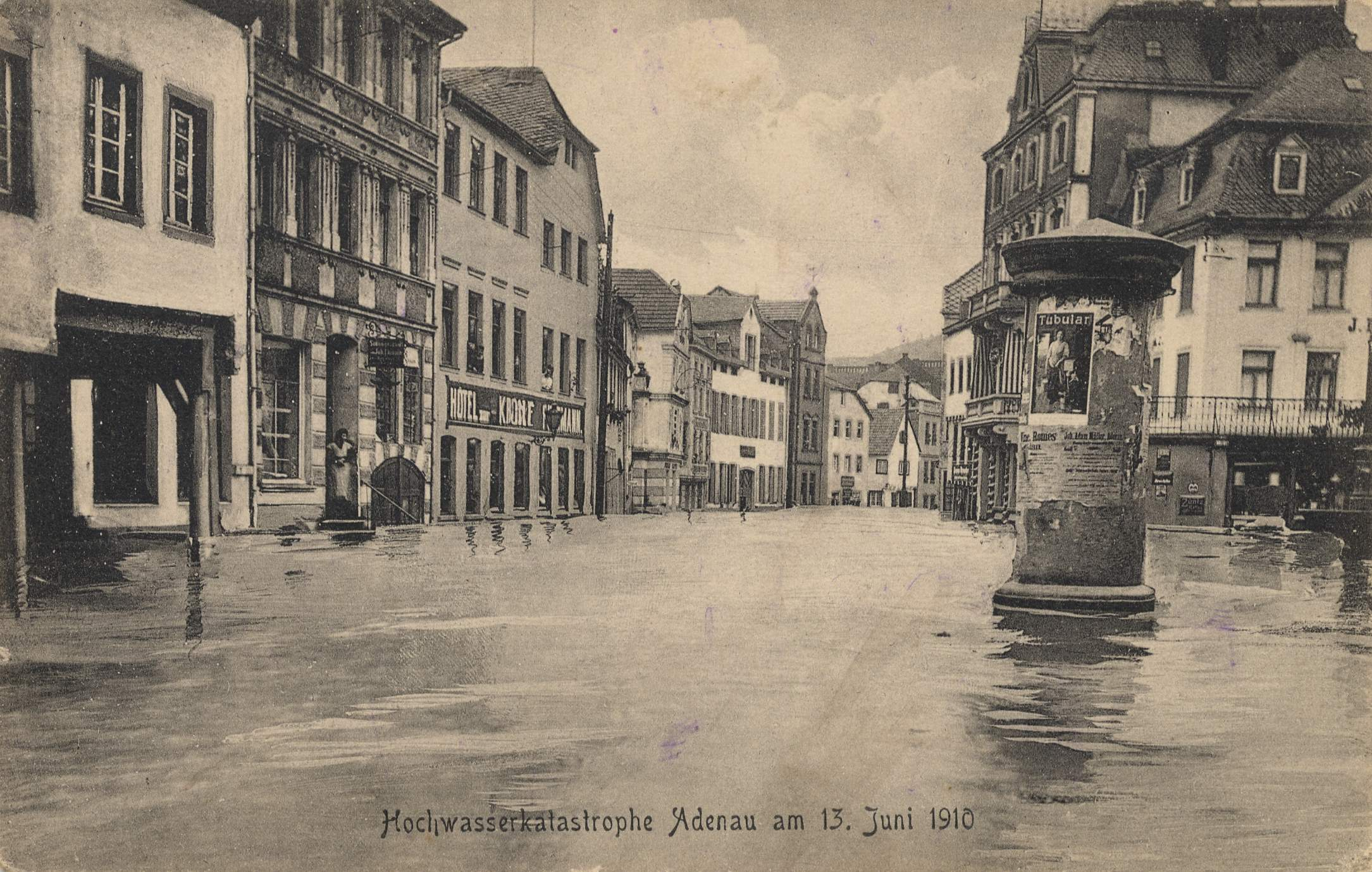
Adenauer Bach in June 1910

The Adenauer Bach is a right-hand, southern tributary of the Ahr, just under 16 kilometres long. It flows through Adenau in the county of Ahrweiler in the German state of Rhineland-Palatinate.

== Geography ==
=== Course ===
In its upper reaches the Adenauer Bach is known as the Breidscheider Bach and it rises about a kilometre south of Quiddelbach at an elevation of ca. 533 m above sea level (NHN). It flows in a northeasterly direction to Breidscheid on the Nordschleife of the Nürburgring motor racing track. From there it bears the name of Adenauer Bach. (Note: Because the name change is associated with its confluence with the Elmigsbach, in most publications it is also referred to as the left-hand, and western headstream, while the Breidscheider Bach is seen as the right-hand and eastern headstream. In this article the Breidscheider Bach is viewed as the upper reaches of the river, in order to enable the use of all data from the Geoexplorer of Rhineland-Palatinate's Water Management Administration (e. g. the length of the river).) It then flows in a westerly direction, mostly in pipes, through the town of Adenau and then heads north, passing the villages of Leimbach and Niederadenau (part of Dümpelfeld). In Dümpelfeld it discharges from the right into the Rhine tributary, the Ahr at about 209 m.

=== Catchment and tributaries ===
The catchment area is 58.5 km² and drains via the Ahr and Rhine into the North Sea.

Among the tributaries of the Adenauer Bach are the following (in downstream order):

Name	GKZ	Length (km)	Direction	Alternative name	Location
Quiddelbach			rechts		
Lochertsbach	2718612	3.5	rechts	Herschbroicherbach	Breidscheid
Elmigsbach	2718614	2.5	links	Stream from the Grippenhardt	Breidscheid
Exbach	271862	4,2	rechts		Adenau
Mittelbach			rechts		Adenau
Näsbach	27186312	1.5	rechts	Naßbach	Adenau
Kallenbach			links		Adenau
Wimbach	2718632	2.0	links		Adenau
Krekelbach	27186392	2.1	links		Adenau
Drasselbach	27186394	0.9	rechts		
Leimbach	271864	3.1	links	Reifferscheiderbach	
Birkenbach			links		Leimbach
Gilgenbach	271866	4.7	rechts		Leimbach
Sengenbach			links		Leimbach
Birnbach	271868	2.9	rechts		
Niederadenauer Bach	2718692	1.4	rechts	Pinselseifen	Niederadenau
Stemmbach			rechts		
