= Eifelgau =

Frankish gau in present day Limestone Eifel in Germany

The Eifelgau was a Frankish gau in the region of the present day Limestone Eifel in Germany.

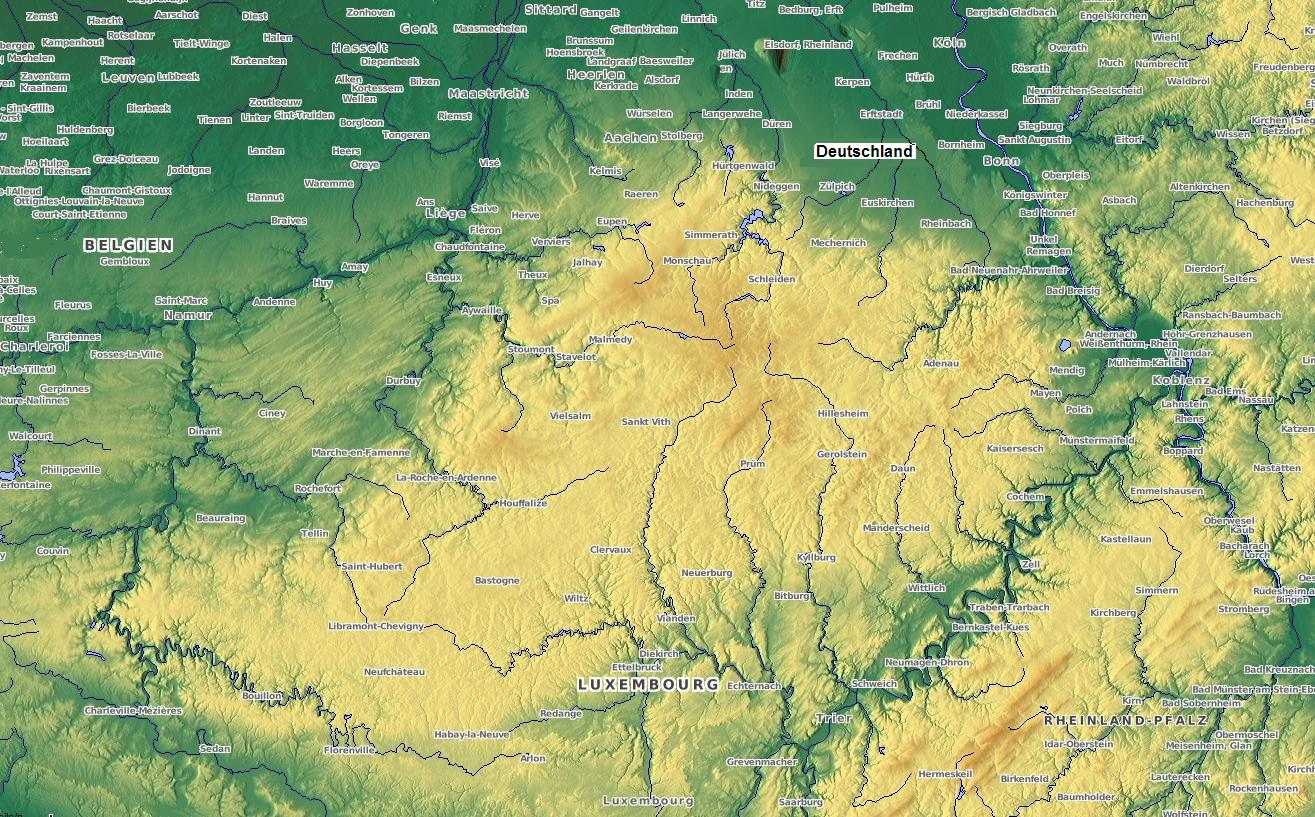
The cross-border highlands of the Ardennes and the Eifel, bounded by the Meuse, Semois, Moselle and Rhine rivers.

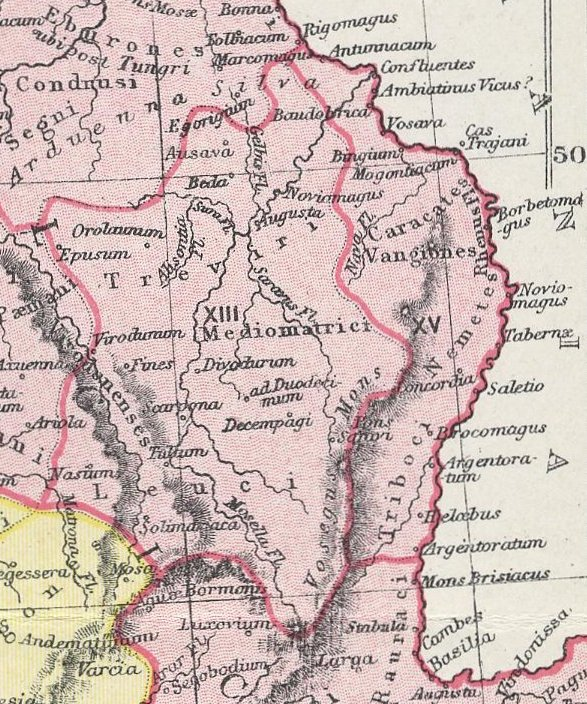
The Arduenna Silva between the Meuse and the Rhine c. 200 AD

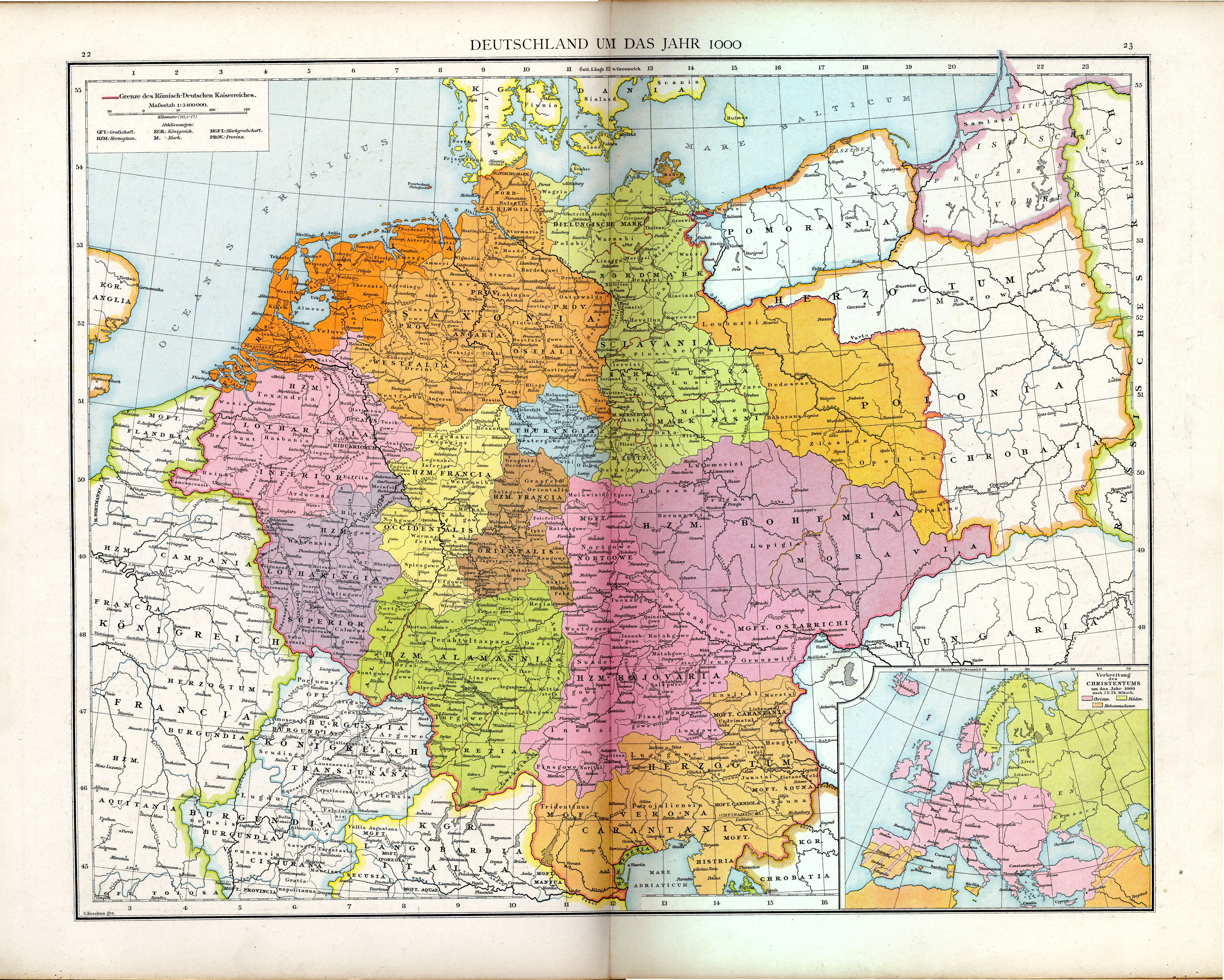
The mediaeval gaus c. 1000 AD

== Location and history ==
The Eifelgau derives its name from the Eifel mountains between the Rhine, Ahr, Rur, Our, Sauer and Moselle rivers. It encompasses the source regions of the rivers Erft, Urft, Kyll and Ahr, and is thus located mainly in the northern and northwestern foothills of the Eifel. The Gau was part of Lower Lorraine and belonged to Ripuaria. It corresponded geographically to the Eifel Deanery of the Diocese of Cologne.

Julius Caesar, in his reports about the Gallic War (58–51 BC), called the whole mountain range between the Rhine, Meuse and Moselle, the Arduenna Silva ("Arduenna Forest"). Roughly around the 7th century the Franks used the term Ardennes for the mountain range and divided their empire into gaus. The Eifelgau lay east of the Ardennengau.

Over the centuries the name Eifel, originally covering the same area as the Eifelgau, came to be used for a larger and larger region. In the meantime the German part of the mountain range became known as the "Eifel", while the Belgian, French and Luxembourgish areas on the other side of the border became the "Ardennes". An exception is the eastern part of Belgium, where it is still called the Eifel.

In the 11th century the gaus lost their political relevance.

== Gaugraves ==
The gau was ruled by gaugraves ("gau counts"):

- Albuin (died after 898), Count of the Eifelgau
- Erenfried (died around 969), Count of the Eifelgau
- Hermann (died 996), Count in the Eifelgau
- Ezzo (died 1064), Count in the Eifelgau
- Heinrich (died around 1061), Count in the Zülpich-Eifelgau
- Theoderich (died around 1086), Count in the Zülpich-Eifelgau

== Settlements in the Eifelgau ==
Ahrdorf, Antweiler, Aremberg, Arloff, Baasem, Bad Münstereifel, Barweiler, Betteldorf, Bewingen, Bouderath, Buir, Dahlem, Engelgau, Frohngau, Gilsdorf, Hillesheim, Holzmülheim, Insul, Iversheim, Kerpen, Kesseling, Lammersdorf, Lessenich, Leudersdorf, Lindweiler, Lommersdorf, Marmagen, Müsch, Nettersheim, Nohn, Oberbettingen, Pesch, Prüm, Reifferscheid, Ripsdorf, Roderath, Satzvey, Schmidtheim, Schuld, Sellerich, Steffeln, Tondorf, Üxheim, Weyer, Wiesbaum and Zingsheim.

== Neighbouring gaus ==
- Zülpichgau (old county of Euskirchen)
- Bidgau (region around Bitburg)
- Ardennengau (region around Malmedy)
- Mayenfeldgau (East Eifel)
- Ripuariergau (Rheinbach/Münstereifel)
- Ahrgau

== Literature ==
- Hermann Aubin: Geschichtlicher Atlas der Rhinelande. Cologne, 1926.
- Eifel Club: Die Eifel 1888–1988. p. 33 ff. ISBN 3-921805-17-1.
- Gerhardt Kentenich: Zur Stadt- and Gauverfassung im frühen Mittelalter. In: Rheinische Vierteljahresblätter. 1932.
- Geschichtlicher Atlas der Rheinlande. 7th issue, IV.9: Die mediaeval Gaue. 2000, Map sheet 1, 1st attachment, revised by Thomas Bauer, ISBN 3-7927-1818-9.

== See also ==
- List of medieval Gaue
