= Kreuz Meckenheim =

Location
- Meckenheim, Germany
- Coordinates: 50°35′35″N 7°1′49″E

Construction
- Type: Cloverleaf interchange
- Opened: 1975

The Kreuz Meckenheim (German: Autobahnkreuz Meckenheim) is a cloverleaf interchange that connects the Bundesautobahn 61 (Venlo - Hockenheim) and 565 (Bonn - Gelsdorf) with each other. It is located in the south of the town of Meckenheim in the Rhein-Sieg-Kreis (North Rhine-Westphalia), a small piece on the southeast side is in the area of the neighboring municipality of Graftschaft in the Ahrweiler district (Rhineland-Palatinate).

== Design and state of development ==
The cross is laid out as a clover leaf with a so-called tangent solution. When those who pass the cross coming from Bonn (A 565) and want to drive on the A 61 in the direction of Koblenz, they must first drive on a direct ramp under the A 565 and then over the A 61 before continuing on the A 61 can.

Both motorways have four lanes at the intersection.

Near the motorway junction, the motorways are linked to the B 257 in the direction of Altenahr - upper Ahr Valley and the former B 266 in the direction of Rheinbach and the lower Ahr valley. The A 565 goes south-west directly into the B 257, the Gelsdorf junction of the A 565 leads to the B 266 not far from the motorway junction.

== Traffic near the interchange ==
From	To	Average daily traffic volume			Proportion of heavy traffic		
From	To	2005	2010	2015	2005	2010	2015
AS Rheinbach (A 61)	AK Meckenheim	50.500	46.100	48.800	22,4 %	24,6 %	20,5 %
AK Meckenheim	Dreieck Bad Neuenahr-Ahrweiler (A 61)	73.400	70.700	72.900	19,8 %	19,2 %	18,9 %
AS Merl (A 565)	AK Meckenheim	33.700	29.500	35.800	9,2 %	11,0 %	10,0 %
AK Meckenheim	AS Gelsdorf (A 565)	13.300	16.200	12.500	4,7 %	6,5 %	5,7 %
