= Eichenbach =

- Municipality
- Coat of arms

- Location of Eichenbach within Ahrweiler district
- Interactive map of Eichenbach
- Location within Germany Location within Rhineland-Palatinate
- Coordinates: 50°25′48″N 6°48′42″E
- Country: Germany
- State: Rhineland-Palatinate
- District: Ahrweiler
- Municipal assoc.: Adenau

Government
  - Mayor: Daniel Neubusch

Area
  - Total: 5.02 km^{2} (1.94 sq mi)
- Elevation: 380 m (1,250 ft)

Population (2025-12-31)
  - Total: 73
  - Density: 15/km^{2} (38/sq mi)
- Time zone: UTC+01:00 (CET)
  - Summer (DST): UTC+02:00 (CEST)
- Postal codes: 53533
- Dialling codes: 02694
- Vehicle registration: AW
- Website: www.eichenbach.de

Eichenbach is an Ortsgemeinde (a local municipality) in the district of Ahrweiler in Rhineland-Palatinate, Germany.

== Geography ==
The village is located in the central area of the Eifel in a side valley of the Ahr. Eichenbach is enclosed by an extensive forest area. The area is drained by the Eichenbach and Dreisbach streams.

The municipality is divided into the districts of Eichenbach and Frohnhofen. The latter is located west of the main village.

== History ==
Until the end of the 18th century, Eichenbach belonged to the Duchy of Arenberg.

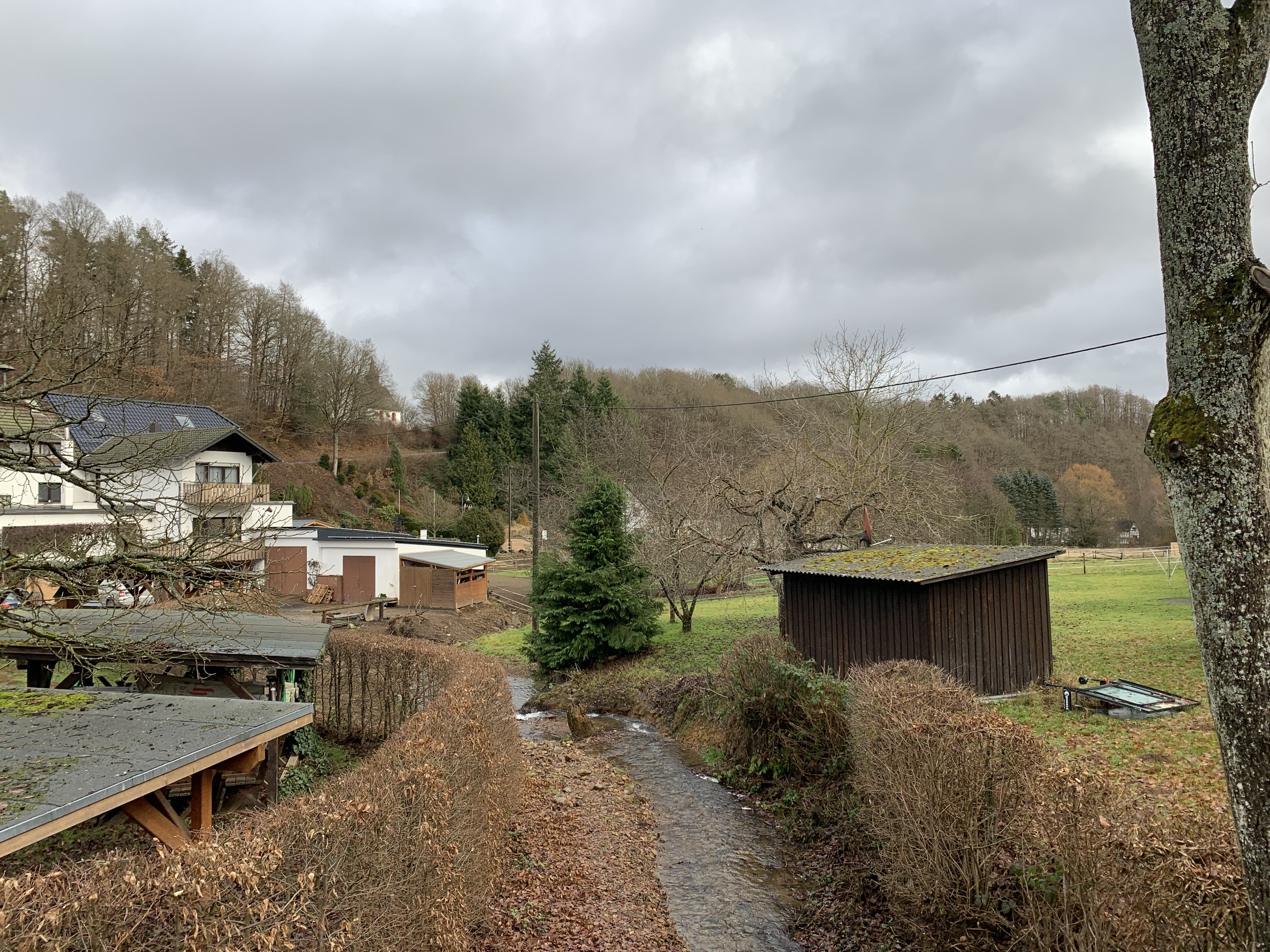
Eichenbach in Eichenbach

In 1794, French revolutionary troops occupied the Left Bank of the Rhine. Under French administration, Eichenbach belonged to the Canton of Adenau, which was assigned to the Rhine-Moselle Department. Following the treaties concluded at the Congress of Vienna, the region, and thus Eichenbach, became part of the Kingdom of Prussia in 1815. Eichenbach (together with Fronhofen) only became independent in 1839; previously, the hamlets of Eichenbach, Fronhofen, and Ohlenhard belonged to the municipality of Wershofen. The municipality of Eichenbach belonged to the Mayoralty of Aremberg in the district of Adenau, which was part of the Government Region of Coblenz and the Rhine Province. In 1932, the Adenau district was dissolved, and the municipality of Eichenbach was assigned to the Ahrweiler district. Since 1946, the municipality has been part of the state of Rhineland-Palatinate, and since 1970, part of the Verbandsgemeinde Adenau.

== Politics ==
=== Municipal Council ===
The municipal council in Eichenbach consists of six council members, who were elected by majority vote in the local elections on June 9, 2024, and the honorary local mayor as chairman.

=== Mayor ===
Daniel Neubusch became the local mayor of Eichenbach on July 4, 2024. In the direct election on June 9, 2024, he was elected as the sole candidate with 74.0% of the vote.

Neubusch's predecessor as local mayor was Heinz Stollenwerk.

== Culture and sights ==
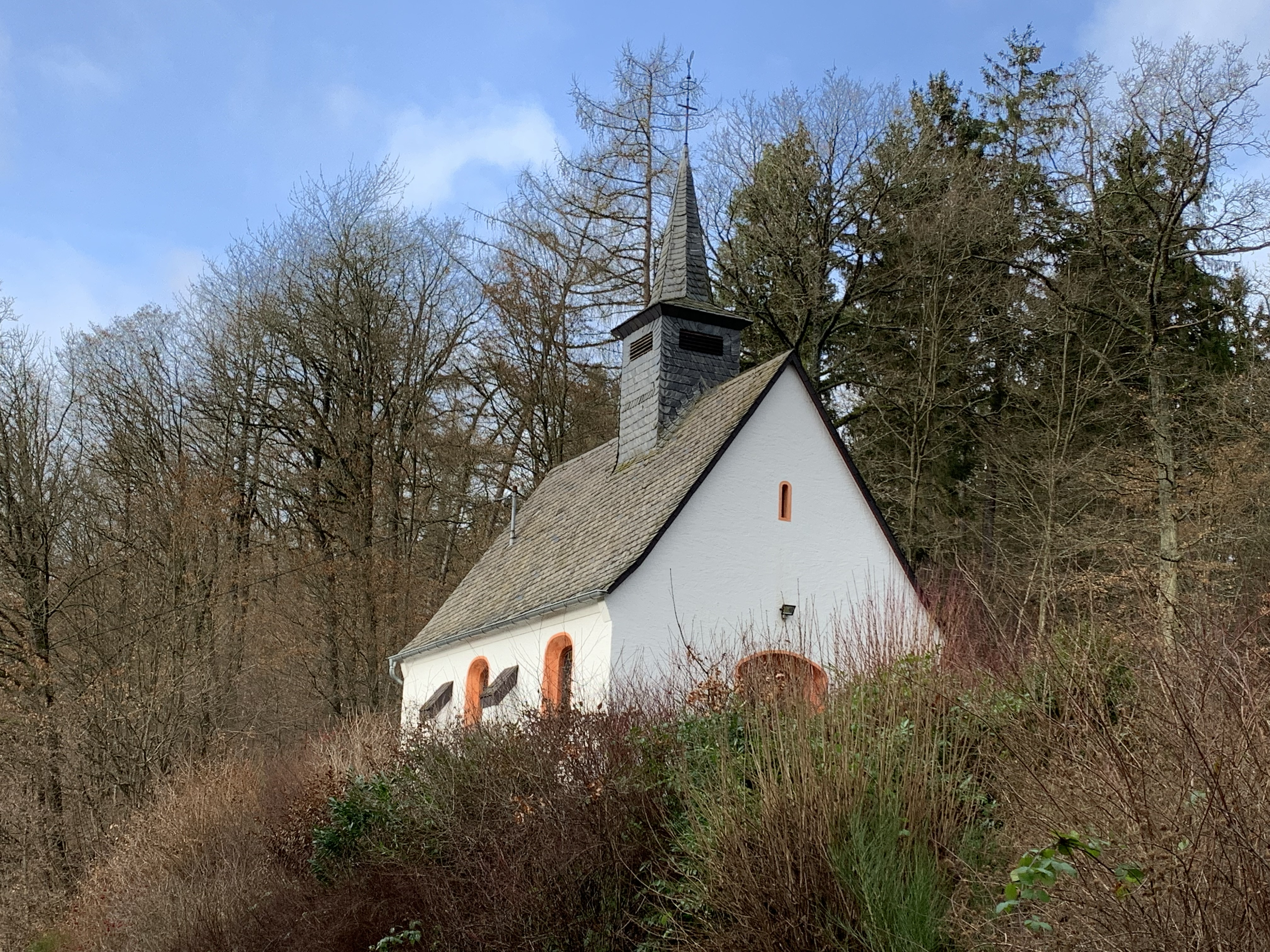
14-Nothelfer-Kapelle (Chapel of the 14 Holy Helpers)

- Above the village center stands a small Chapel, dedicated to the Fourteen Holy Helpers. The laying of the foundation stone took place on July 27, 1937, and it was completed in 1941. In 1977, the structure was renovated and received night storage heating in 2000. The interior contains a relief of a wayside shrine from 1626 as well as wooden figures of the 14 Holy Helpers.
