= Breidscheid =

- Stadtteil of Adenau
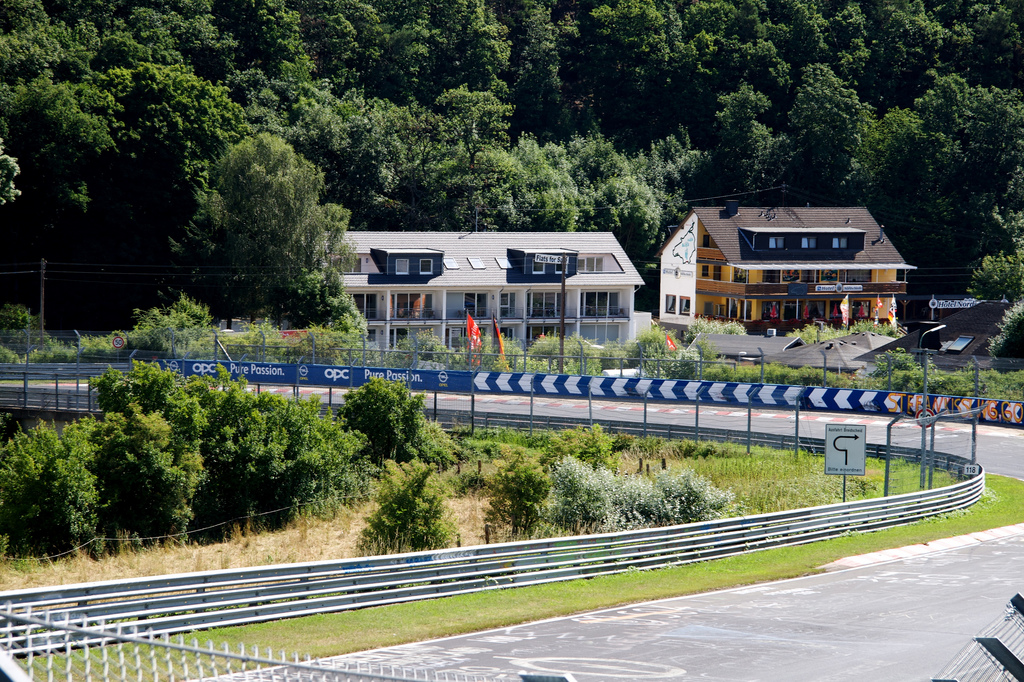
- Nordschleife crossing Breidscheid
- Interactive map of Breidscheid
- Location within Germany Location within Rhineland-Palatinate
- Coordinates: 50°22′26″N 6°57′7″E
- Country: Germany
- State: Rhineland-Palatinate
- District: Ahrweiler
- Town: Adenau
- Time zone: UTC+01:00 (CET)
  - Summer (DST): UTC+02:00 (CEST)

Breidscheid (German pronunciation: [ˈbʁaɪtˌʃaɪt]) is a quarter (Stadtteil) of Adenau, having been part of the town since 1 October 1952; before that, it was an independent municipality. In addition to Nürburg, Quiddelbach and Herschbroich, Breidscheid is one of four places that are within the Nordschleife section of the Nürburgring.

Breidscheid was first mentioned in 1157, the Lords of Breidscheid since the 13th century. The Breidscheider Chapel is dedicated to Saint Roch and Sebastian and is said to have been built as a plague chapel in 1630.
