= Waldorf, Rhineland-Palatinate =

Waldorf
- Municipality
- Coat of arms

- Location of Waldorf within Ahrweiler district
- Interactive map of Waldorf
- Location within Germany Location within Rhineland-Palatinate
- Coordinates: 50°29′8″N 7°13′50″E
- Country: Germany
- State: Rhineland-Palatinate
- District: Ahrweiler
- Municipal assoc.: Bad Breisig

Government
  - Mayor (2019–24): Hans-Dieter Felten

Area
  - Total: 7.61 km^{2} (2.94 sq mi)
- Elevation: 156 m (512 ft)

Population (2025-12-31)
  - Total: 884
  - Density: 116/km^{2} (301/sq mi)
- Time zone: UTC+01:00 (CET)
  - Summer (DST): UTC+02:00 (CEST)
- Postal codes: 53498
- Dialling codes: 02636
- Vehicle registration: AW
- Website: Internetpräsenz der Gemeinde Waldorf

Waldorf is a municipality belonging to the Verbandsgemeinde Bad Breisig in the district of Ahrweiler, in Rhineland-Palatinate, Germany. In 2020 Waldorf had 866 inhabitants.

== Location ==
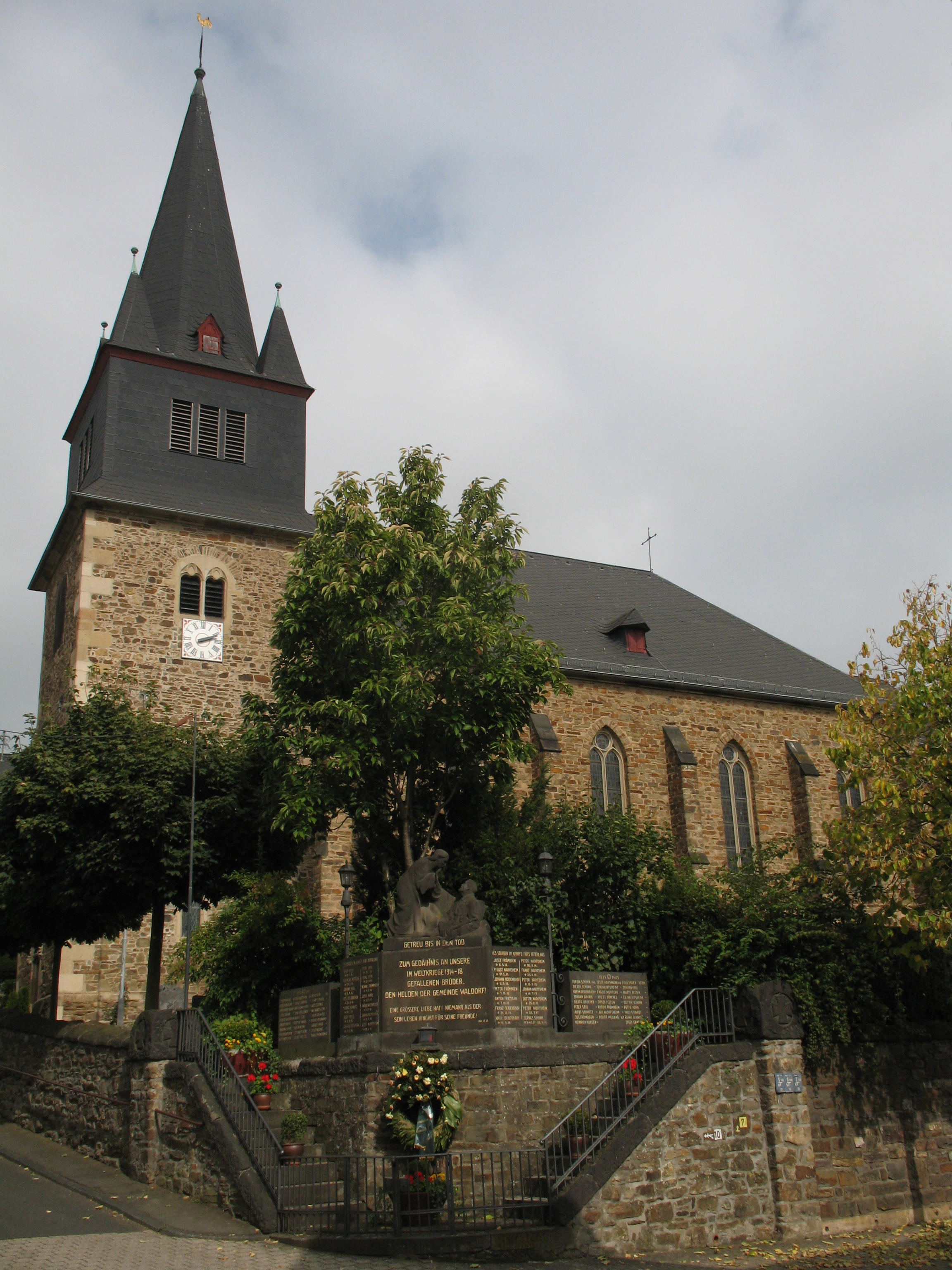
Church

Waldorf is located in the eastern foothills of the Eifel in the Vinxt Valley between Sinzig and Niederzissen, below the Bausenberg, an extinct volcano. Waldorf is marked by the Geology of the Bausenberg. The lava flow flew along the today's southern border of the village. At the western border of the village the Bundesautobahn 61 crosses the Vinxt Valley with the Vinxtbachtalbrücke.

== History ==
The first documentary mention was in the year 960. Eugen Ewig, a local historian, found out that first signs of settlement prove the existence of Waldorf in 646. Thus Waldorf celebrated its 1350th anniversary in 1996.

=== Development of inhabitants ===
- 1815 – 622
- 1835 – 742
- 1871 – 717
- 1905 – 712
- 1939 – 606
- 1950 – 633
- 1961 – 660
- 1965 – 663
- 1970 – 684
- 1975 – 724
- 1980 – 757
- 1985 – 727
- 1987 – 778
- 1990 – 798
- 1995 – 839
- 2000 – 893
- 2005 – 926

Source of data: Statistisches Landesamt Rheinland-Pfalz

== Events ==
- Spectaculum historiae, a festival on the occasion of the 1360th anniversary of Waldorf's first documentary mention, where Waldorf has been divided into four parts and all eras from the Roman to the new era were represented
- St. Remaklus Kirmes, as many other villages and towns, Waldorf celebrates the birthday of its saint. This is usually the first weekend of September. The Kirmes is organised by the catholic bachelors club (Katholischer Junggesellenverein Waldorf 1738 e.V.)

== See also ==
- Waldorf Music
