= Bausenberg =

Hill of the Eifel in Rhineland-Palatinate, Germany

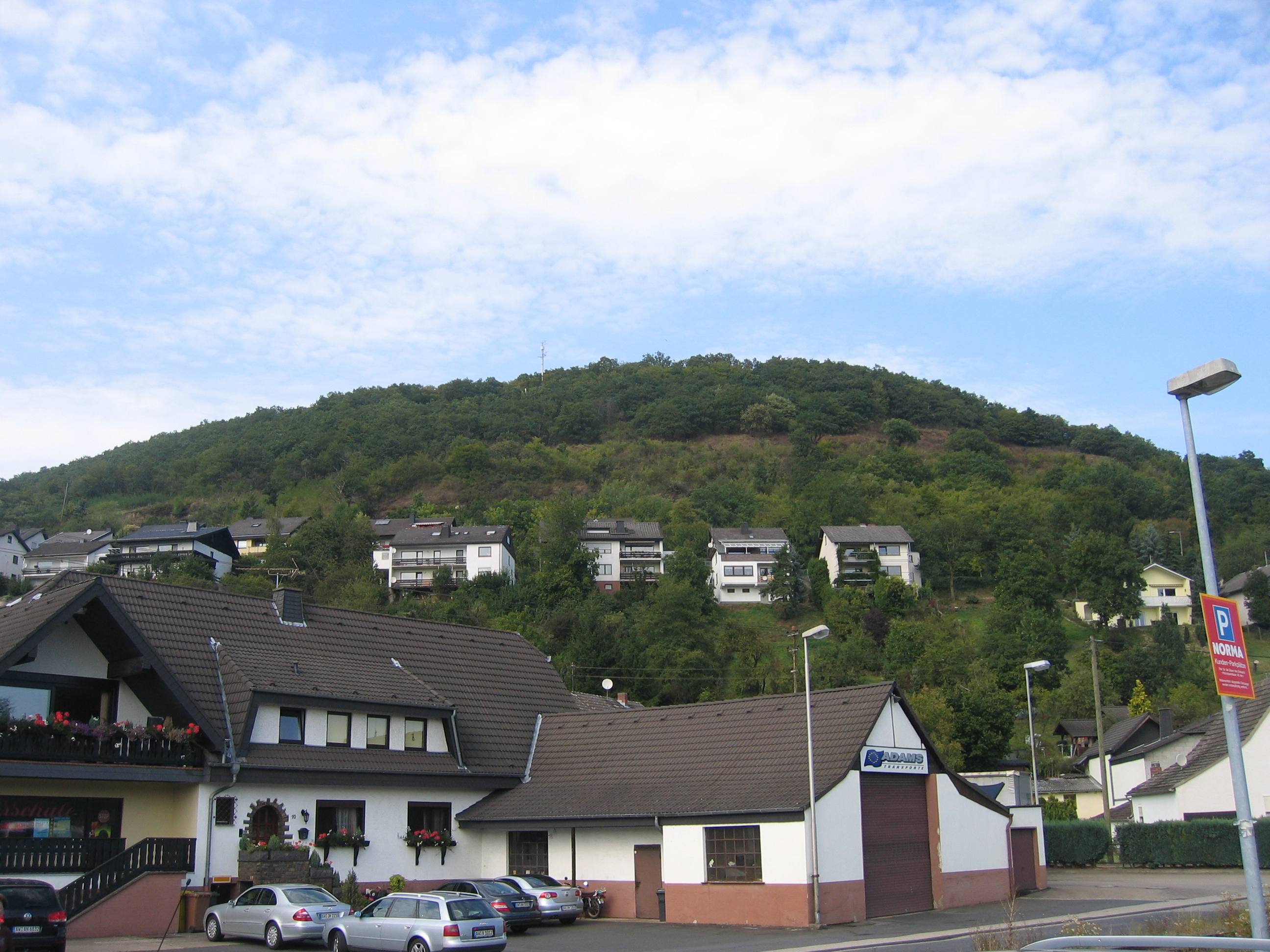

Highest point
- Elevation: 339.8 m above sea level (NN) (1,115 ft)
- Coordinates: 50°28′2.62″N 7°13′16.43″E

Geography
- Location within Rhineland-Palatinate
- Location: Ahrweiler, Rhineland-Palatinate, Germany
- Parent range: Eifel

Geology
- Mountain type: cinder cone

The Bausenberg is a cinder cone hill, 339.8 m above sea level (NN), in the East Eifel in the county of Ahrweiler in the German state of Rhineland-Palatinate.

== Location ==
The Bausenberg is located between Niederzissen immediately to the south and Waldorf to the north-northeast. To the east is the motorway junction of Niederzissen on the A61.

== Description ==
The area around the Bausenberg is a protected area, which was initially provisionally established by a regulation dated 27 August 1968. On 14 April 1981, the hill was officially declared a nature reserve by the regional government of Koblenz. The reserve has an area of 127 hectares and covers parts of the parishes of Niederzissen and Waldorf. Its purposes are to preserve the cinder cone, including its northeasterly lava flow, due to its special geological significance and also to protect, for scientific reasons, rare plant species and communities as well as habitats for rare animals. Also on the Bausenberg is a well formed circular rampart which is part of the reserve.
