= Reifferscheid =

- Municipality
- Coat of arms

- Location of Reifferscheid within Ahrweiler district
- Interactive map of Reifferscheid
- Location within Germany Location within Rhineland-Palatinate
- Coordinates: 50°24′10″N 6°53′20″E
- Country: Germany
- State: Rhineland-Palatinate
- District: Ahrweiler
- Municipal assoc.: Adenau

Government
  - Mayor (2019–24): Peter Leßmann

Area
  - Total: 14.24 km^{2} (5.50 sq mi)
- Elevation: 564 m (1,850 ft)

Population (2025-12-31)
  - Total: 478
  - Density: 33.6/km^{2} (86.9/sq mi)
- Time zone: UTC+01:00 (CET)
  - Summer (DST): UTC+02:00 (CEST)
- Postal codes: 53520
- Dialling codes: 02691
- Vehicle registration: AW

Reifferscheid (German pronunciation: [ˈʁaɪfɐʃaɪt]) is a municipality in the district of Ahrweiler, in Rhineland-Palatinate, Germany. It belongs to the Verbandsgemeinde Adenau and is one of the highest points in the High Eifel.

== History ==
The oldest traces of settlement are finds from the early Celtic Protohistory. Reifferscheid was first mentioned in a document from St. Maximin's Abbey in Trier in 975. From 1276, the place belonged to the county of Nürburg and thus to the Electorate of Cologne. A Schultheiß belonging to the electoral office of Nürburg had its seat in Reifferscheid until the end of the 18th century.

== Schools ==
It was recorded first in 1654 that a school has been established in Reifferscheid. Lately there has been a primary school only, which has been closed in by end of July 2018. The school was closed, due the low number of children attending it. Right before it closed, only 10 children have been in the school in class 1-4. The children that remained had to change to the school of Antweiler.

There has been an old school-building, which served as a community-building until it was sold lately, it was built in 1897. Due to the new community-hall "Gemeindehaus Eifelblick" its use became obsolete.

== Culture ==
Like many villages in the rural regions of Germany, Reifferscheid also has a broad variety of unincorporated associations. They contribute a major share to the cultural and public life of the region. One of them it the "Jungesellenverein Einigkeit", which is a bachelors-club - named "unity", in which only unmarried men are allowed. The founding-date is 1913 and was founded by a group of men, being part of the local choir at that time. The Junggesellenverein contributes to the public life, as they will put up the Maypole, a decorated tree, in the center of the village during the first of May. Apart from other villages, that perform this task on 30 April, in Reifferscheid is it done on the first of May and by hand only. Its maypole has been the second-highest in Germany, ranking right behind Berlin in 1936. This tradition has been only broken once in 2001, where the tree has been such big, that a truck-crane had to support the manual erection for safety reasons.

The local kermis is also organized by the Junggesellenverein and traditionally takes-place at the end of September, celebrating St. Michaels day.

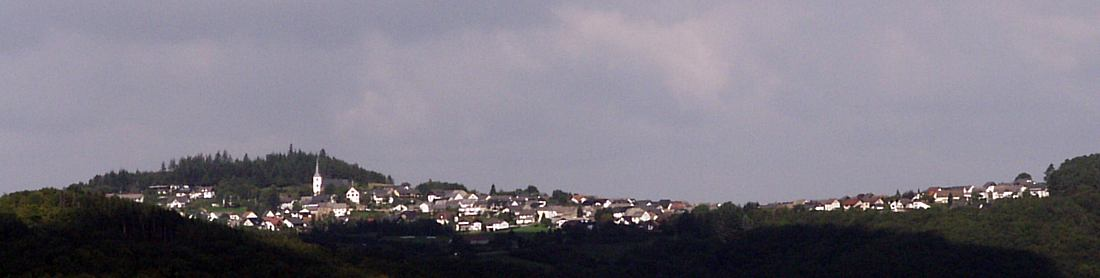
