= Kottenborn =

- Municipality
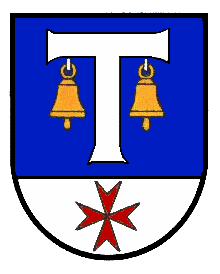
- Coat of arms

- Location of Kottenborn within Ahrweiler district
- Interactive map of Kottenborn
- Location within Germany Location within Rhineland-Palatinate
- Coordinates: 50°21′12″N 6°54′02″E
- Country: Germany
- State: Rhineland-Palatinate
- District: Ahrweiler
- Municipal assoc.: Adenau

Government
  - Mayor (2019–24): Klaus Jüngling

Area
  - Total: 3.78 km^{2} (1.46 sq mi)
- Elevation: 500 m (1,600 ft)

Population (2025-12-31)
  - Total: 180
  - Density: 48/km^{2} (120/sq mi)
- Time zone: UTC+01:00 (CET)
  - Summer (DST): UTC+02:00 (CEST)
- Postal codes: 53518
- Dialling codes: 02641
- Vehicle registration: AW
- Website: www.kottenborn.de

Kottenborn is a municipality in the district of Ahrweiler, in Rhineland-Palatinate, Germany. It has a population of 172 (2019).
