= Winnerath =

- Municipality
- Coat of arms

- Location of Winnerath within Ahrweiler district
- Interactive map of Winnerath
- Location within Germany Location within Rhineland-Palatinate
- Coordinates: 50°25′46″N 6°52′39″E
- Country: Germany
- State: Rhineland-Palatinate
- District: Ahrweiler
- Municipal assoc.: Adenau

Government
  - Mayor (2019–24): Andre Kürsten

Area
  - Total: 3.33 km^{2} (1.29 sq mi)
- Elevation: 460 m (1,510 ft)

Population (2025-12-31)
  - Total: 186
  - Density: 55.9/km^{2} (145/sq mi)
- Time zone: UTC+01:00 (CET)
  - Summer (DST): UTC+02:00 (CEST)
- Postal codes: 53520
- Dialling codes: 02695
- Vehicle registration: AW
- Website: www.winnerath.de

Winnerath (German pronunciation: [ˈvɪnəʁaːt]) is a municipality in the district of Ahrweiler, in Rhineland-Palatinate, Germany.
