= Kaltenborn =

- Municipality
- Coat of arms

- Location of Kaltenborn within Ahrweiler district
- Interactive map of Kaltenborn
- Location within Germany Location within Rhineland-Palatinate
- Coordinates: 50°24′19″N 7°00′55″E
- Country: Germany
- State: Rhineland-Palatinate
- District: Ahrweiler
- Municipal assoc.: Adenau

Government
  - Mayor (2019–24): Manfred Hoffmann

Area
  - Total: 21.82 km^{2} (8.42 sq mi)
- Elevation: 437 m (1,434 ft)

Population (2025-12-31)
  - Total: 345
  - Density: 15.8/km^{2} (41.0/sq mi)
- Time zone: UTC+01:00 (CET)
  - Summer (DST): UTC+02:00 (CEST)
- Postal codes: 53520
- Dialling codes: 02695
- Vehicle registration: AW
- Website: www.kaltenborn-eifel.de

Kaltenborn is a municipality in the district of Ahrweiler, in Rhineland-Palatinate, Germany.
