= Bauler, Ahrweiler =

Bauler
- Municipality
- Location of Bauler within Ahrweiler district
- Interactive map of Bauler
- Location within Germany Location within Rhineland-Palatinate
- Coordinates: 50°19′23″N 6°52′31″E
- Country: Germany
- State: Rhineland-Palatinate
- District: Ahrweiler
- Municipal assoc.: Adenau

Government
  - Mayor (2019–24): Raimund Michels

Area
  - Total: 2.33 km^{2} (0.90 sq mi)
- Elevation: 430 m (1,410 ft)

Population (2025-12-31)
  - Total: 50
  - Density: 21/km^{2} (56/sq mi)
- Time zone: UTC+01:00 (CET)
  - Summer (DST): UTC+02:00 (CEST)
- Postal codes: 53534
- Dialling codes: 02692
- Vehicle registration: AW

Bauler (German pronunciation: [ˈbaʊlɐ]) is a municipality in the district of Ahrweiler, in Rhineland-Palatinate, Germany.
