= Adenau (Verbandsgemeinde) =

- Verbandsgemeinde
- Coat of arms

- Location of Adenau within Landkreis Ahrweiler district
- Interactive map of Adenau
- Location within Germany Location within Rhineland-Palatinate
- Coordinates: 50°23′0″N 6°55′49″E
- Country: Germany
- State: Rhineland-Palatinate
- District: Landkreis Ahrweiler
- Subdivisions: 37 Gemeinden

Government
  - Mayor (2021–29): Guido Nisius (CDU)

Area
  - Total: 257.75 km^{2} (99.52 sq mi)

Population (2025-12-31)
  - Total: 12,855
  - Density: 49.874/km^{2} (129.17/sq mi)
- Time zone: UTC+01:00 (CET)
  - Summer (DST): UTC+02:00 (CEST)
- Vehicle registration: AW
- Website: adenau.de

Adenau is a Verbandsgemeinde ("collective municipality") in the district of Ahrweiler, in Rhineland-Palatinate, Germany. The seat of the municipality is in Adenau.

The Verbandsgemeinde Adenau consists of the following Ortsgemeinden ("local municipalities"):

| Municipality | Area (km²) | Population |
|---|---|---|
| Adenau * | 18.56 | 2943 |
| Antweiler | 4.46 | 477 |
| Aremberg | 9.62 | 207 |
| Barweiler | 8.52 | 376 |
| Bauler | 2.34 | 50 |
| Dankerath | 3.26 | 76 |
| Dorsel | 7.20 | 170 |
| Dümpelfeld | 11.86 | 567 |
| Eichenbach | 5.02 | 73 |
| Fuchshofen | 2.84 | 89 |
| Harscheid | 3.13 | 145 |
| Herschbroich | 7.27 | 277 |
| Hoffeld | 5.15 | 297 |
| Honerath | 2.01 | 161 |
| Hümmel | 15.84 | 475 |
| Insul | 5.01 | 483 |
| Kaltenborn | 21.82 | 345 |
| Kottenborn | 3.78 | 180 |
| Leimbach | 15.65 | 422 |
| Meuspath | 3.06 | 165 |
| Müllenbach | 8.02 | 513 |
| Müsch | 3.81 | 165 |
| Nürburg | 3.63 | 192 |
| Ohlenhard | 5.01 | 125 |
| Pomster | 5.81 | 155 |
| Quiddelbach | 4.43 | 256 |
| Reifferscheid | 14.24 | 478 |
| Rodder | 6.38 | 230 |
| Schuld | 5.93 | 609 |
| Senscheid | 4.27 | 81 |
| Sierscheid | 2.34 | 88 |
| Trierscheid | 4.11 | 78 |
| Wershofen | 14.36 | 891 |
| Wiesemscheid | 5.60 | 264 |
| Wimbach | 6.84 | 417 |
| Winnerath | 3.33 | 186 |
| Wirft | 3.25 | 149 |
| Verbandsgemeinde Adenau | 257.75 | 12855 |

^{*} seat of the Verbandsgemeinde
