= Wiesemscheid =

- Municipality
- Coat of arms

- Location of Wiesemscheid within Ahrweiler district
- Interactive map of Wiesemscheid
- Location within Germany Location within Rhineland-Palatinate
- Coordinates: 50°20′10″N 6°53′30″E
- Country: Germany
- State: Rhineland-Palatinate
- District: Ahrweiler
- Municipal assoc.: Adenau

Government
  - Mayor (2019–24): Andreas Baur

Area
  - Total: 5.60 km^{2} (2.16 sq mi)
- Elevation: 512 m (1,680 ft)

Population (2025-12-31)
  - Total: 264
  - Density: 47.1/km^{2} (122/sq mi)
- Time zone: UTC+01:00 (CET)
  - Summer (DST): UTC+02:00 (CEST)
- Postal codes: 53534
- Dialling codes: 02691
- Vehicle registration: AW
- Website: www.adenau.de

Wiesemscheid is a municipality in the district of Ahrweiler, in Rhineland-Palatinate, Germany.
