= Pomster =

- Municipality
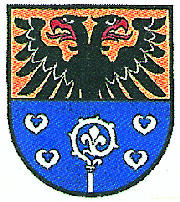
- Coat of arms

- Location of Pomster within Ahrweiler district
- Interactive map of Pomster
- Location within Germany Location within Rhineland-Palatinate
- Coordinates: 50°21′8″N 6°50′33″E
- Country: Germany
- State: Rhineland-Palatinate
- District: Ahrweiler
- Municipal assoc.: Adenau

Government
  - Mayor (2019–24): Siegfried Müller

Area
  - Total: 5.81 km^{2} (2.24 sq mi)
- Elevation: 438 m (1,437 ft)

Population (2025-12-31)
  - Total: 155
  - Density: 26.7/km^{2} (69.1/sq mi)
- Time zone: UTC+01:00 (CET)
  - Summer (DST): UTC+02:00 (CEST)
- Postal codes: 53534
- Dialling codes: 02691
- Vehicle registration: AW

Pomster is a municipality in the district of Ahrweiler, in Rhineland-Palatinate, Germany. It is located in the Eifel mountain range.
