= Dankerath =

- Municipality
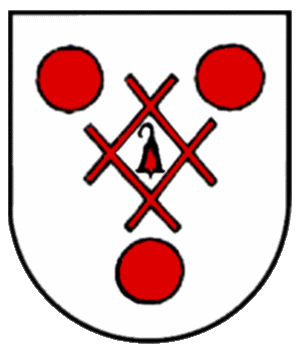
- Coat of arms

- Location of Dankerath within Ahrweiler district
- Interactive map of Dankerath
- Location within Germany Location within Rhineland-Palatinate
- Coordinates: 50°20′20″N 6°49′20″E
- Country: Germany
- State: Rhineland-Palatinate
- District: Ahrweiler
- Municipal assoc.: Adenau

Government
  - Mayor (2019–24): Marco Collet

Area
  - Total: 3.26 km^{2} (1.26 sq mi)
- Elevation: 460 m (1,510 ft)

Population (2025-12-31)
  - Total: 76
  - Density: 23/km^{2} (60/sq mi)
- Time zone: UTC+01:00 (CET)
  - Summer (DST): UTC+02:00 (CEST)
- Postal codes: 53520
- Dialling codes: 02696
- Vehicle registration: AW

Dankerath is a municipality in the district of Ahrweiler, in Rhineland-Palatinate, Germany.

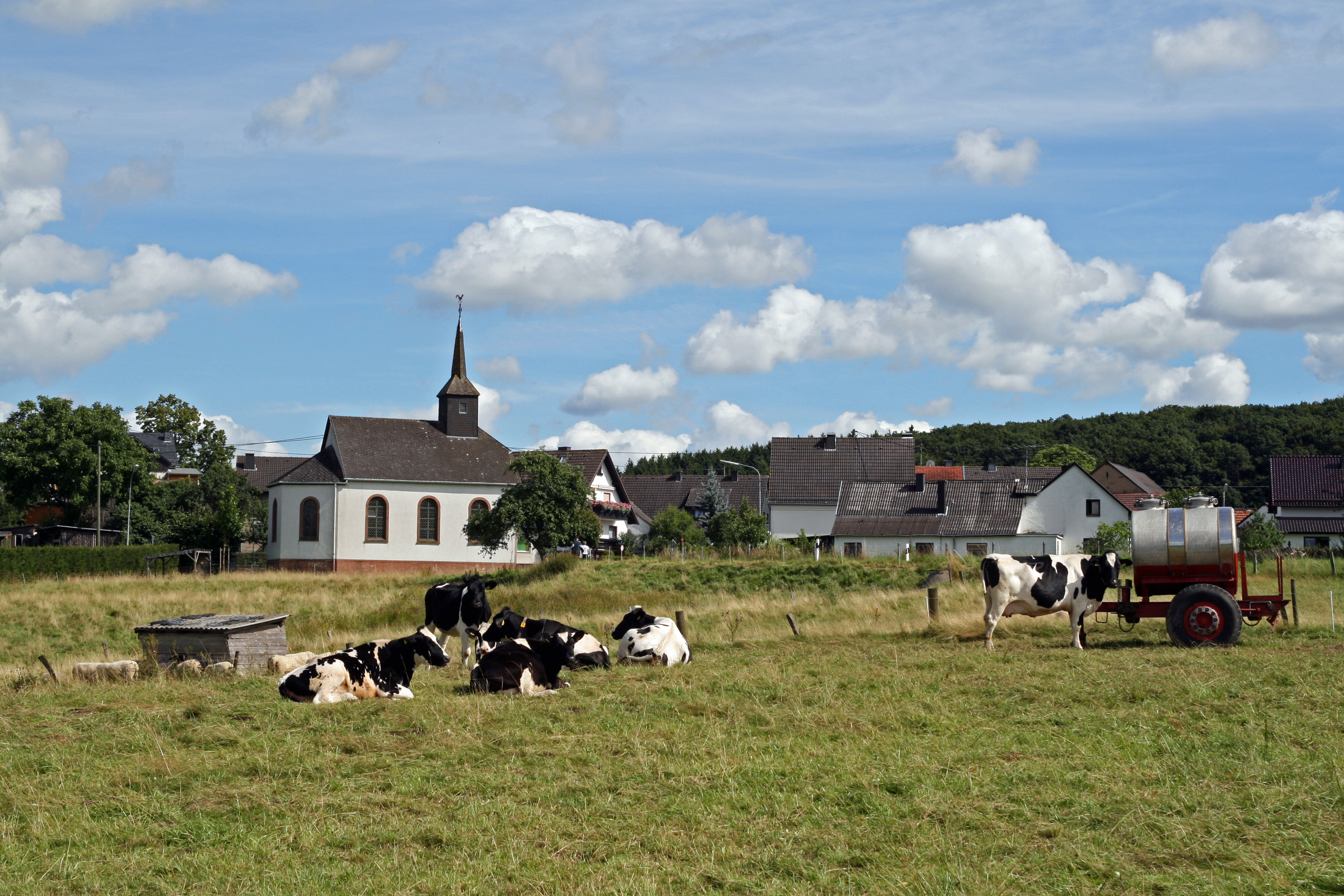
Dankerath
