= Meuspath =

- Municipality
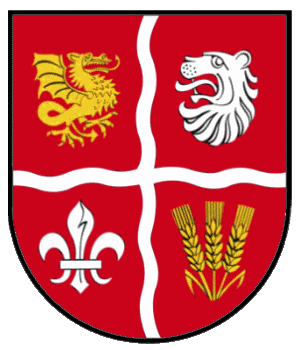
- Coat of arms

- Location of Meuspath within Ahrweiler district
- Interactive map of Meuspath
- Location within Germany Location within Rhineland-Palatinate
- Coordinates: 50°20′42″N 6°58′26″E
- Country: Germany
- State: Rhineland-Palatinate
- District: Ahrweiler
- Municipal assoc.: Adenau

Government
  - Mayor (2019–24): Klaus Dieter Speicher

Area
  - Total: 3.06 km^{2} (1.18 sq mi)
- Elevation: 560 m (1,840 ft)

Population (2025-12-31)
  - Total: 165
  - Density: 53.9/km^{2} (140/sq mi)
- Time zone: UTC+01:00 (CET)
  - Summer (DST): UTC+02:00 (CEST)
- Postal codes: 53520
- Dialling codes: 02691
- Vehicle registration: AW

Meuspath is a municipality in the district of Ahrweiler, in Rhineland-Palatinate, Germany.

Meuspath is the home of wige Solutions gmbh, who provide official timing data for motorsports events such as the 24 Hours Nürburgring.
