= Christopher Theisen =

German footballer (born 1993)

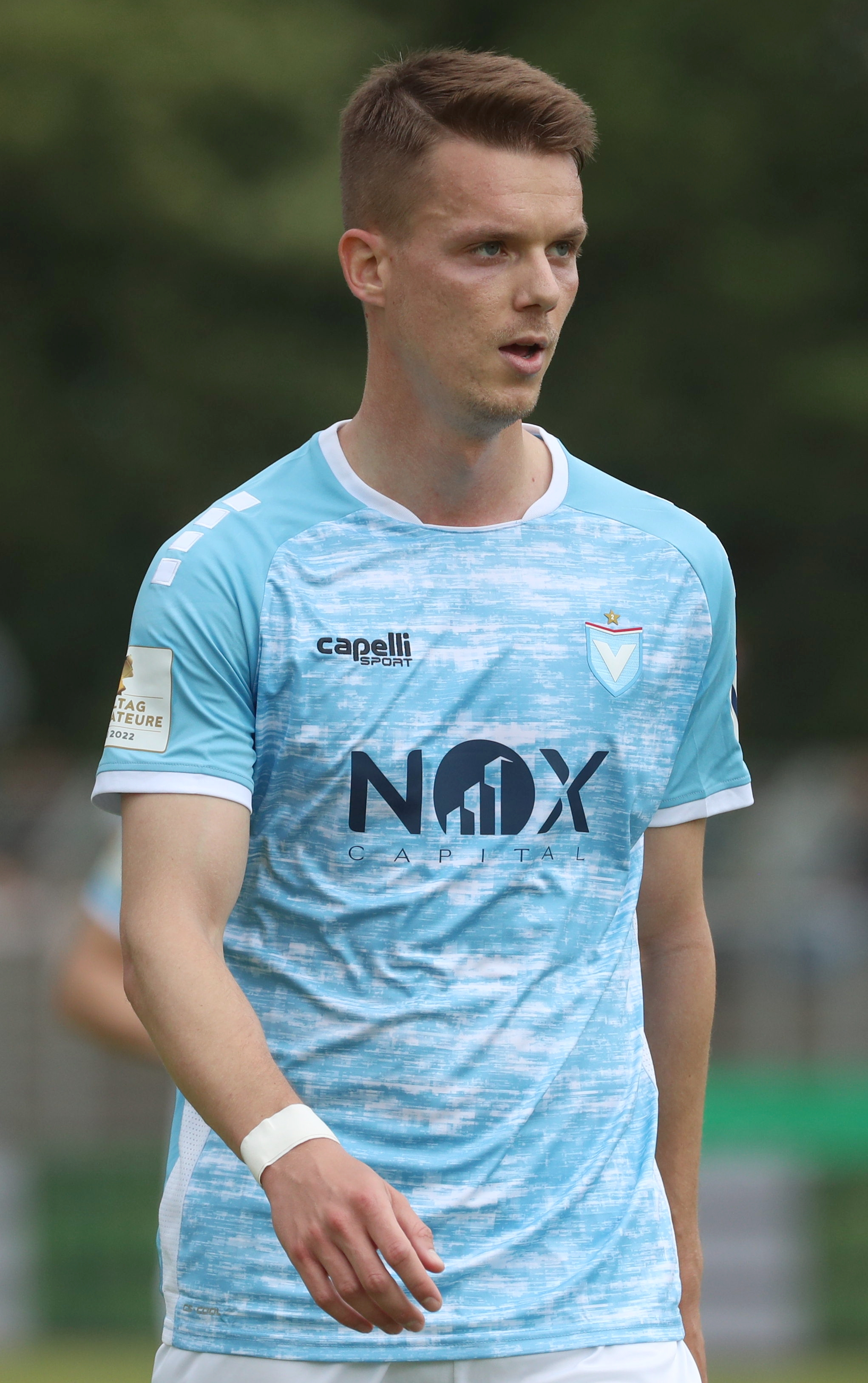

Personal information
- Date of birth: 13 June 1993 (age 33)
- Place of birth: Adenau, Germany
- Height: 1.87 m (6 ft 2 in)
- Position: Midfielder

Team information
- Current team: TSV Steinbach
- Number: 13

Youth career
- –2006: TuWI Adenau
- 2006–2008: TuS Mayen
- 2008–2009: TuS Koblenz
- 2009–2012: Eintracht Trier

Senior career*
Years	Team	Apps	(Gls)
2012	Eintracht Trier II	1	(0)
2012–2016	FC Nürnberg II	80	(16)
2016–2018	Fortuna Köln	38	(1)
2018–2020	FC 08 Homburg	52	(18)
2020–2023	Viktoria Berlin	62	(13)
2023–	TSV Steinbach	47	(10)
- * Club domestic league appearances and goals as of 1 January 2025

Christopher Theisen (born 13 June 1993) is a German professional footballer who plays as a midfielder for TSV Steinbach.
