= Rodder =

- Municipality
- Coat of arms

- Location of Rodder within Ahrweiler district
- Interactive map of Rodder
- Location within Germany Location within Rhineland-Palatinate
- Coordinates: 50°23′38″N 6°51′35″E
- Country: Germany
- State: Rhineland-Palatinate
- District: Ahrweiler
- Municipal assoc.: Adenau

Government
  - Mayor (2019–24): Thomas Jüngling

Area
  - Total: 6.38 km^{2} (2.46 sq mi)
- Elevation: 440 m (1,440 ft)

Population (2025-12-31)
  - Total: 230
  - Density: 36/km^{2} (93/sq mi)
- Time zone: UTC+01:00 (CET)
  - Summer (DST): UTC+02:00 (CEST)
- Postal codes: 53520
- Dialling codes: 02693
- Vehicle registration: AW

Rodder (German pronunciation: [ˈʁɔdɐ]) is a municipality in the district of Ahrweiler, in Rhineland-Palatinate, Germany.
