= Fuchshofen =

- Municipality
- Coat of arms

- Location of Fuchshofen within Ahrweiler district
- Interactive map of Fuchshofen
- Location within Germany Location within Rhineland-Palatinate
- Coordinates: 50°25′44″N 6°51′05″E
- Country: Germany
- State: Rhineland-Palatinate
- District: Ahrweiler
- Municipal assoc.: Adenau

Government
  - Mayor (2019–24): Bernd Schmitz

Area
  - Total: 2.84 km^{2} (1.10 sq mi)
- Elevation: 262 m (860 ft)

Population (2025-12-31)
  - Total: 89
  - Density: 31/km^{2} (81/sq mi)
- Time zone: UTC+01:00 (CET)
  - Summer (DST): UTC+02:00 (CEST)
- Postal codes: 53533
- Dialling codes: 02693
- Vehicle registration: AW
- Website: www.fuchshofen.de

Fuchshofen is a municipality in the district of Ahrweiler, in Rhineland-Palatinate, Germany.
