= Honerath =

- Municipality
- Coat of arms

- Location of Honerath within Ahrweiler district
- Interactive map of Honerath
- Location within Germany Location within Rhineland-Palatinate
- Coordinates: 50°22′40″N 6°53′57″E
- Country: Germany
- State: Rhineland-Palatinate
- District: Ahrweiler
- Municipal assoc.: Adenau

Government
  - Mayor (2019–24): Stefan Zimmermann

Area
  - Total: 2.01 km^{2} (0.78 sq mi)
- Elevation: 398 m (1,306 ft)

Population (2025-12-31)
  - Total: 161
  - Density: 80.1/km^{2} (207/sq mi)
- Time zone: UTC+01:00 (CET)
  - Summer (DST): UTC+02:00 (CEST)
- Postal codes: 53518
- Dialling codes: 02691
- Vehicle registration: AW
- Website: honerath.de

Honerath is a municipality in the district of Ahrweiler, in Rhineland-Palatinate, Germany.
