= Bundesautobahn 565 =

Federal motorway in Germany

A 565
- Bundesautobahn 565
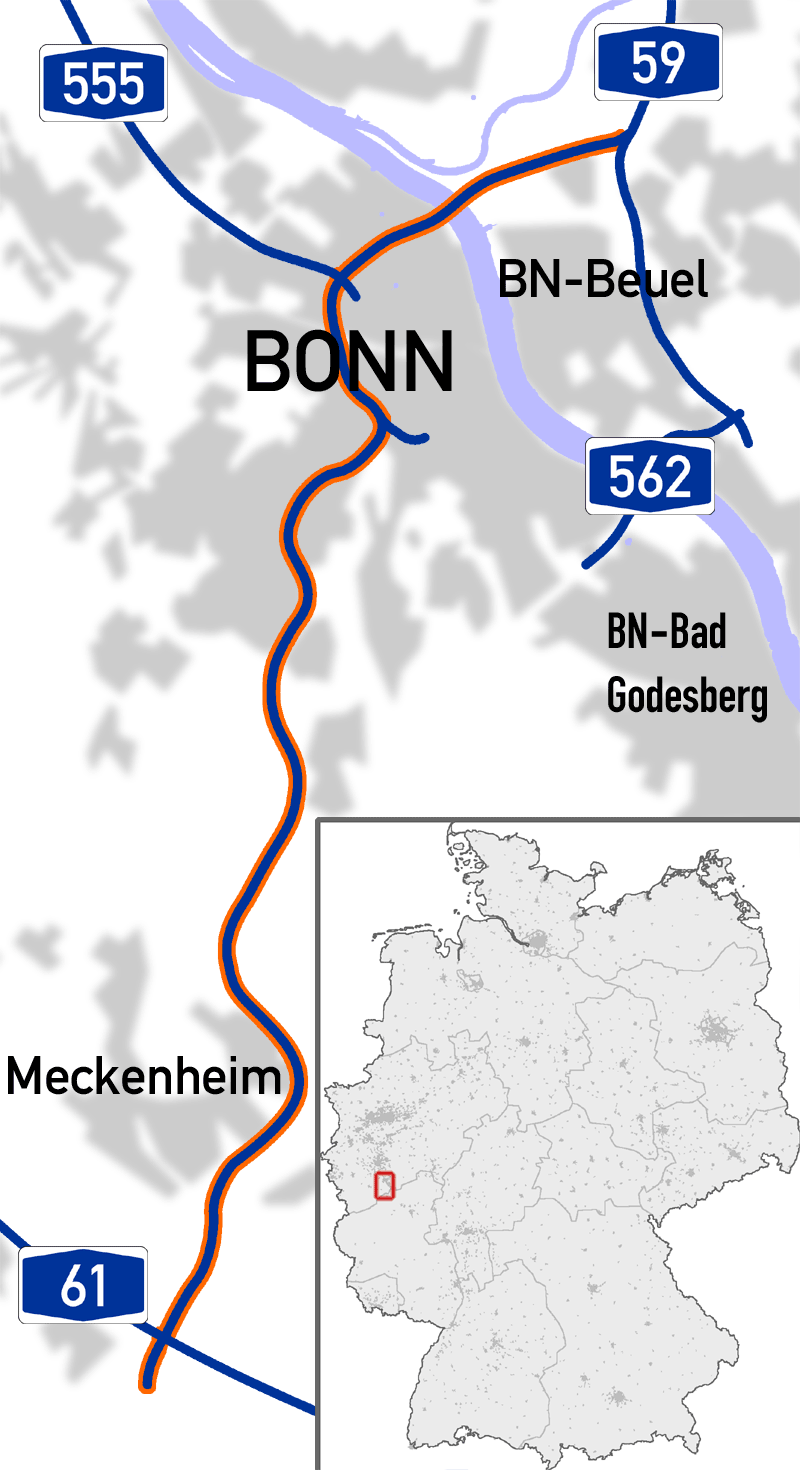

Route information
- Length: 26 km (16 mi)

Major junctions
- North end: Sankt Augustin
- South end: Gelsdorf

Location
- Country: Germany
- States: North Rhine-Westphalia, Rhineland-Palatinate

Highway system
- Roads in Germany; Autobahns; List; Federal; List; State; E-roads

Bundesautobahn 565 (translates from German as Federal Motorway 565, short form Autobahn 565, abbreviated as BAB 565 or A 565) is an autobahn in Germany, linking the A 59 to the A 61.

The oldest section of the A 565 was built in 1959, a branch of the Cologne - Bonn road. This short autobahn, which served as bypass of Bonn, ran from the present-day location of the interchange Bonn-Nord, over the Tausendfüßler bridge, and ending at the current junction Bonn-Endenich. This section was built with two lanes in each direction and was never widened, making it one of the busiest stretches of autobahn in Germany. Later, the road was extended to Lengsdorf, the present-day site of the junction Bonn-Lengsdorf. In 1967, the highway was further extended to the north, across the Rhine and up to the A 170 Flughafenautobahn (present-day A 59). At this point, various sections of the Bonn bypass was signed as the B 56n, the B 9n, and the B 257n from there to Lengsdorf. Next, work focused on the southern end of the road. The section from Lengsdorf to Meckenheim-Nord was opened in 1971. The road was designated entirely as the A 221 along with the opening of that section. The southernmost portion, from the A 61 to the end of the autobahn, opened in 1973; the remaining portion from the A 61 to Meckenheim-Nord opened two years later. In between the two openings, in 1974, the autobahn received the designation of A 565.

== Exit list ==
(1)	Bonn-Nordost 3-way interchange A 59
(2)	Bonn-Beuel
	Friedrich-Ebert-Brücke 520 m over the Rhine
(3)	Bonn-Auerberg
(4)	4-way interchange Bonn-Nord A 555
(5)	Bonn-Tannenbusch; Access to/from southbound only
	Tausendfüßler 630 m
(6)	Bonn-Endenich B 9 B 56; Access to/from northbound only
(7)	Bonn-Poppelsdorf
(8)	Bonn-Lengsdorf
(9)	Bonn-Hardtberg
(10)	Meckenheim-Nord; Access to/from northbound only
(11)	Meckenheim-Merl
(12)	4-way interchange Meckenheim A 61 E31
(13)	Gelsdorf
B 257	Road continues as the B 257 towards Altenahr
