= Dorsel =

- Municipality
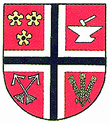
- Coat of arms

- Location of Dorsel within Ahrweiler district
- Interactive map of Dorsel
- Location within Germany Location within Rhineland-Palatinate
- Coordinates: 50°22′46″N 6°47′30″E
- Country: Germany
- State: Rhineland-Palatinate
- District: Ahrweiler
- Municipal assoc.: Adenau

Government
  - Mayor (2019–24): Günter Adrian

Area
  - Total: 7.20 km^{2} (2.78 sq mi)
- Elevation: 390 m (1,280 ft)

Population (2025-12-31)
  - Total: 170
  - Density: 24/km^{2} (61/sq mi)
- Time zone: UTC+01:00 (CET)
  - Summer (DST): UTC+02:00 (CEST)
- Postal codes: 53533
- Dialling codes: 02693
- Vehicle registration: AW

Dorsel is a municipality in the district of Ahrweiler, in Rhineland-Palatinate, Germany.
