= Senscheid =

- Municipality
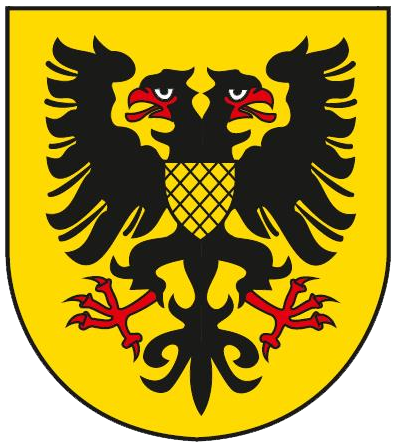
- Coat of arms

- Location of Senscheid within Ahrweiler district
- Interactive map of Senscheid
- Location within Germany Location within Rhineland-Palatinate
- Coordinates: 50°19′52″N 6°49′55″E
- Country: Germany
- State: Rhineland-Palatinate
- District: Ahrweiler
- Municipal assoc.: Adenau

Government
  - Mayor (2019–24): Dirk Ueberhofen

Area
  - Total: 4.27 km^{2} (1.65 sq mi)
- Elevation: 496 m (1,627 ft)

Population (2025-12-31)
  - Total: 81
  - Density: 19/km^{2} (49/sq mi)
- Time zone: UTC+01:00 (CET)
  - Summer (DST): UTC+02:00 (CEST)
- Postal codes: 53520
- Dialling codes: 02692
- Vehicle registration: AW

Senscheid is a municipality in the district of Ahrweiler, in Rhineland-Palatinate, Germany.
