= Wirft =

- Municipality
- Coat of arms

- Location of Wirft within Ahrweiler district
- Interactive map of Wirft
- Location within Germany Location within Rhineland-Palatinate
- Coordinates: 50°22′29″N 6°51′22″E
- Country: Germany
- State: Rhineland-Palatinate
- District: Ahrweiler
- Municipal assoc.: Adenau

Government
  - Mayor (2019–24): Peter Pürling

Area
  - Total: 3.25 km^{2} (1.25 sq mi)
- Elevation: 345 m (1,132 ft)

Population (2025-12-31)
  - Total: 149
  - Density: 45.8/km^{2} (119/sq mi)
- Time zone: UTC+01:00 (CET)
  - Summer (DST): UTC+02:00 (CEST)
- Postal codes: 53534
- Dialling codes: 02691
- Vehicle registration: AW
- Website: www.adenau.de

Wirft is a municipality in the district of Ahrweiler, in Rhineland-Palatinate, Germany.
