= Sierscheid =

- Municipality
- Coat of arms

- Location of Sierscheid within Ahrweiler district
- Interactive map of Sierscheid
- Location within Germany Location within Rhineland-Palatinate
- Coordinates: 50°27′23″N 6°55′6″E
- Country: Germany
- State: Rhineland-Palatinate
- District: Ahrweiler
- Municipal assoc.: Adenau

Government
  - Mayor (2023–24): Gregor Jonas

Area
  - Total: 2.34 km^{2} (0.90 sq mi)
- Elevation: 388 m (1,273 ft)

Population (2025-12-31)
  - Total: 88
  - Density: 38/km^{2} (97/sq mi)
- Time zone: UTC+01:00 (CET)
  - Summer (DST): UTC+02:00 (CEST)
- Postal codes: 53520
- Dialling codes: 02695
- Vehicle registration: AW

Sierscheid is a municipality in the district of Ahrweiler, in Rhineland-Palatinate, Germany.
