= Harscheid =

- Municipality
- Coat of arms

- Location of Harscheid within Ahrweiler district
- Interactive map of Harscheid
- Location within Germany Location within Rhineland-Palatinate
- Coordinates: 50°27′33″N 6°53′31″E
- Country: Germany
- State: Rhineland-Palatinate
- District: Ahrweiler
- Municipal assoc.: Adenau

Government
  - Mayor (2019–24): Günther Hilterscheid

Area
  - Total: 3.13 km^{2} (1.21 sq mi)
- Elevation: 414 m (1,358 ft)

Population (2025-12-31)
  - Total: 145
  - Density: 46.3/km^{2} (120/sq mi)
- Time zone: UTC+01:00 (CET)
  - Summer (DST): UTC+02:00 (CEST)
- Postal codes: 53520
- Dialling codes: 02695
- Vehicle registration: AW

Harscheid is a municipality in the district of Ahrweiler, in Rhineland-Palatinate, Germany.
