= Hoffeld =

- Municipality
- Coat of arms

- Location of Hoffeld within Ahrweiler district
- Interactive map of Hoffeld
- Location within Germany Location within Rhineland-Palatinate
- Coordinates: 50°22′16″N 6°49′12″E
- Country: Germany
- State: Rhineland-Palatinate
- District: Ahrweiler
- Municipal assoc.: Adenau

Government
  - Mayor (2019–24): Marco Jax

Area
  - Total: 5.15 km^{2} (1.99 sq mi)
- Elevation: 400 m (1,300 ft)

Population (2025-12-31)
  - Total: 297
  - Density: 57.7/km^{2} (149/sq mi)
- Time zone: UTC+01:00 (CET)
  - Summer (DST): UTC+02:00 (CEST)
- Postal codes: 53534
- Dialling codes: 02693
- Vehicle registration: AW

Hoffeld is a municipality in the district of Ahrweiler, in Rhineland-Palatinate, Germany.
