= Hümmel =

Municipality in Rhineland-Palatinate, Germany

- Municipality
- Coat of arms

- Location of Hümmel within Ahrweiler district
- Interactive map of Hümmel
- Location within Germany Location within Rhineland-Palatinate
- Coordinates: 50°27′41″N 6°46′42″E
- Country: Germany
- State: Rhineland-Palatinate
- District: Ahrweiler
- Municipal assoc.: Adenau

Government
  - Mayor (2019–24): Demian Taschenmacher

Area
  - Total: 15.84 km^{2} (6.12 sq mi)
- Elevation: 414 m (1,358 ft)

Population (2025-12-31)
  - Total: 475
  - Density: 30.0/km^{2} (77.7/sq mi)
- Time zone: UTC+01:00 (CET)
  - Summer (DST): UTC+02:00 (CEST)
- Postal codes: 53520
- Dialling codes: 02694
- Vehicle registration: AW

Hümmel is a municipality in the district of Ahrweiler, in Rhineland-Palatinate, Germany.

The municipality has a forest of ancient beeches. It employs the forester and author Peter Wohlleben, who operates an ecologically sensitive burial ground there to generate funds for maintenance and protection of the forest. He gives talks and publishes books to increase public understanding of trees and their interdependence.
