= Wimbach =

- Municipality
- Coat of arms

- Location of Wimbach within Ahrweiler district
- Interactive map of Wimbach
- Location within Germany Location within Rhineland-Palatinate
- Coordinates: 50°21′51″N 6°54′38″E
- Country: Germany
- State: Rhineland-Palatinate
- District: Ahrweiler
- Municipal assoc.: Adenau

Government
  - Mayor (2019–24): Detlev Goebel

Area
  - Total: 6.84 km^{2} (2.64 sq mi)
- Elevation: 380 m (1,250 ft)

Population (2025-12-31)
  - Total: 417
  - Density: 61.0/km^{2} (158/sq mi)
- Time zone: UTC+01:00 (CET)
  - Summer (DST): UTC+02:00 (CEST)
- Postal codes: 53518
- Dialling codes: 02691
- Vehicle registration: AW
- Website: www.adenau.de

Wimbach (German pronunciation: [ˈvɪmbax]) is a municipality in the district of Ahrweiler, in Rhineland-Palatinate, Germany.
