= Niederzissen =

- Municipality
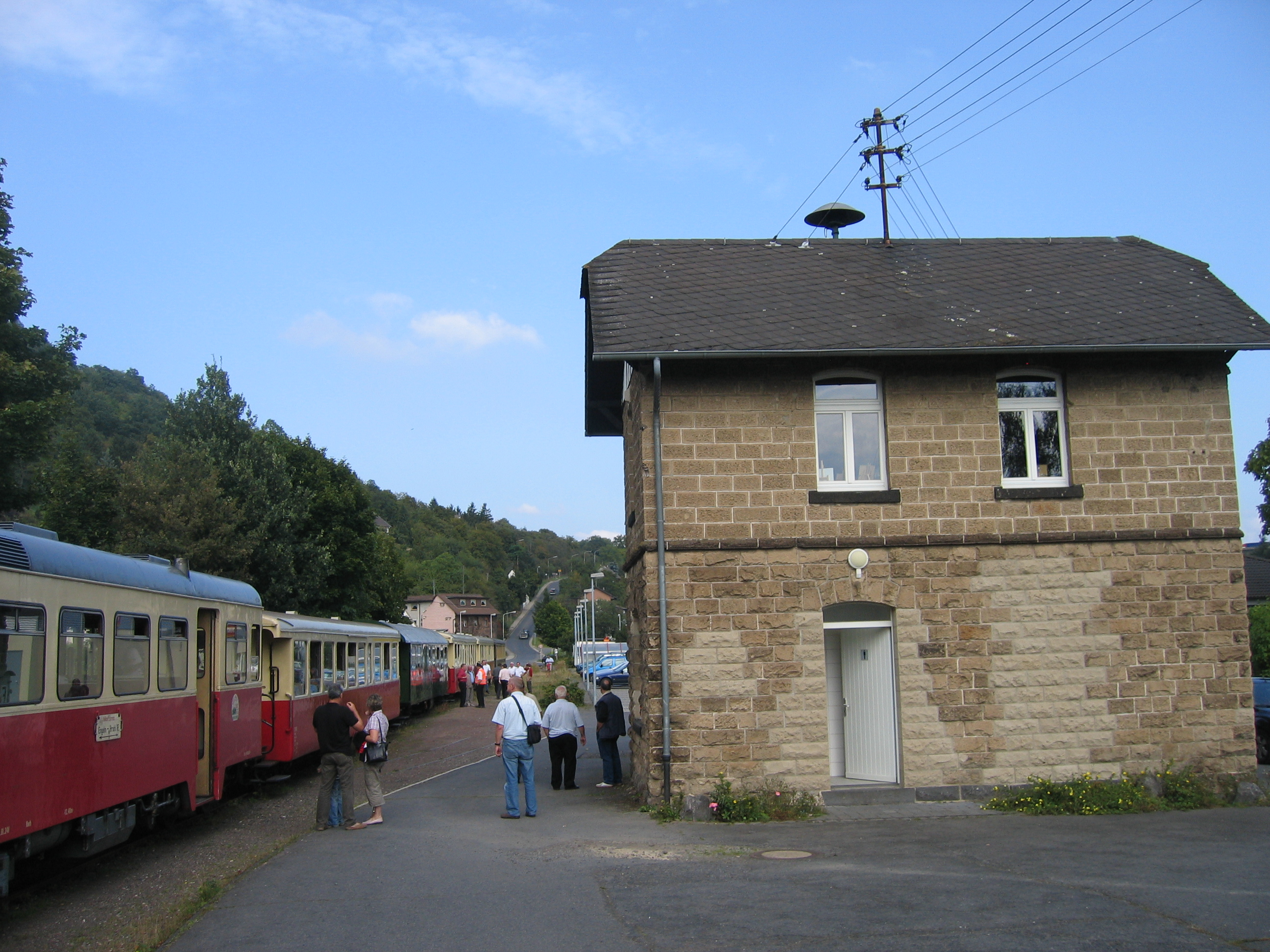
- Train station

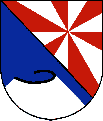
- Coat of arms

- Location of Niederzissen within Ahrweiler district
- Interactive map of Niederzissen
- Location within Germany Location within Rhineland-Palatinate
- Coordinates: 50°27′26″N 7°13′17″E
- Country: Germany
- State: Rhineland-Palatinate
- District: Ahrweiler
- Municipal assoc.: Brohltal
- Subdivisions: 2

Government
  - Mayor (2024–29): Rolf Hans (CDU)

Area
  - Total: 11.95 km^{2} (4.61 sq mi)
- Elevation: 203 m (666 ft)

Population (2025-12-31)
  - Total: 2,754
  - Density: 230.5/km^{2} (596.9/sq mi)
- Time zone: UTC+01:00 (CET)
  - Summer (DST): UTC+02:00 (CEST)
- Postal codes: 56651
- Dialling codes: 02636
- Vehicle registration: AW
- Website: www.niederzissen.de

Niederzissen is a municipality in the district of Ahrweiler, in Rhineland-Palatinate, Germany.

The Bausenberg is located to the north of Niederzissen.
