= Müsch =

- Municipality
- Coat of arms

- Location of Müsch within Ahrweiler district
- Interactive map of Müsch
- Location within Germany Location within Rhineland-Palatinate
- Coordinates: 50°23′14″N 6°49′42″E
- Country: Germany
- State: Rhineland-Palatinate
- District: Ahrweiler
- Municipal assoc.: Adenau

Government
  - Mayor (2019–24): Udo Adriany

Area
  - Total: 3.81 km^{2} (1.47 sq mi)
- Elevation: 389 m (1,276 ft)

Population (2025-12-31)
  - Total: 165
  - Density: 43.3/km^{2} (112/sq mi)
- Time zone: UTC+01:00 (CET)
  - Summer (DST): UTC+02:00 (CEST)
- Postal codes: 53533
- Dialling codes: 0221
- Vehicle registration: AW

Müsch (German pronunciation: [mʏʃ]) is a municipality in the district of Ahrweiler, in Rhineland-Palatinate, Germany.
