= Müllenbach =

- Municipality
- Coat of arms

- Location of Müllenbach within Ahrweiler district
- Interactive map of Müllenbach
- Location within Germany Location within Rhineland-Palatinate
- Coordinates: 50°19′12″N 6°54′46″E
- Country: Germany
- State: Rhineland-Palatinate
- District: Ahrweiler
- Municipal assoc.: Adenau

Government
  - Mayor (2019–24): Matthias Rieder

Area
  - Total: 8.02 km^{2} (3.10 sq mi)
- Elevation: 465 m (1,526 ft)

Population (2025-12-31)
  - Total: 513
  - Density: 64.0/km^{2} (166/sq mi)
- Time zone: UTC+01:00 (CET)
  - Summer (DST): UTC+02:00 (CEST)
- Postal codes: 53520
- Dialling codes: 02692
- Vehicle registration: AW

Müllenbach (German pronunciation: [ˈmʏlənbax]) is a municipality in the district of Ahrweiler, in Rhineland-Palatinate, Germany.

== History ==
The village was first mentioned in a document under the name "Mohlenbach" in 1398, but the remains of a Roman country house, which may date back to the 2nd or 3rd century, indicate the first settlement about a thousand years earlier. The present village probably grew together with the original farms.

The present local community probably grew together from originally four farms. Müllenbach belonged to the lords of Daun until 1427 and came by purchase to Kurtrier in whose sovereignty the place remained until the end of the 18th century. The village was under the administration and the court of the Daun office. The Maximin monastery in Trier had landlordial rights. Ecclesiastically, the whole Amt Daun and thus also Müllenbach belonged to the Archbishopric of Cologne. In the 17th century the landlord rights were bought by the farmers of the village and thus the feudal relationship to the Maximin Abbey ended, the inhabitants of Müllenbach became free farmers. The preserved municipal code from 1754 included 42 articles, and a mayor was elected annually.
