= Herschbroich =

- Municipality
- Coat of arms

- Location of Herschbroich within Ahrweiler district
- Interactive map of Herschbroich
- Location within Germany Location within Rhineland-Palatinate
- Coordinates: 50°21′59″N 6°58′6″E
- Country: Germany
- State: Rhineland-Palatinate
- District: Ahrweiler
- Municipal assoc.: Adenau

Government
  - Mayor (2019–24): Monika Korden

Area
  - Total: 7.27 km^{2} (2.81 sq mi)
- Elevation: 408 m (1,339 ft)

Population (2025-12-31)
  - Total: 277
  - Density: 38.1/km^{2} (98.7/sq mi)
- Time zone: UTC+01:00 (CET)
  - Summer (DST): UTC+02:00 (CEST)
- Postal codes: 53518
- Dialling codes: 02691
- Vehicle registration: AW
- Website: www.herschbroich.de

Herschbroich is a municipality in the district of Ahrweiler, in Rhineland-Palatinate, Germany.

It lies within the original Nürburgring racing circuit.
