= Insul =

- Municipality
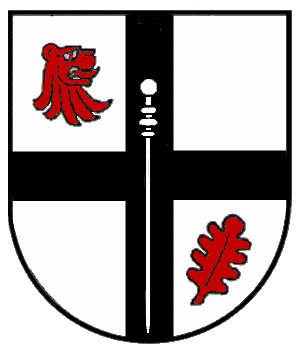
- Coat of arms

- Location of Insul within Ahrweiler district
- Interactive map of Insul
- Location within Germany Location within Rhineland-Palatinate
- Coordinates: 50°26′25″N 6°54′55″E
- Country: Germany
- State: Rhineland-Palatinate
- District: Ahrweiler
- Municipal assoc.: Adenau

Government
  - Mayor (2019–24): Ewald Neiß

Area
  - Total: 5.01 km^{2} (1.93 sq mi)
- Elevation: 218 m (715 ft)

Population (2025-12-31)
  - Total: 483
  - Density: 96.4/km^{2} (250/sq mi)
- Time zone: UTC+01:00 (CET)
  - Summer (DST): UTC+02:00 (CEST)
- Postal codes: 53520
- Dialling codes: 02695
- Vehicle registration: AW
- Website: www.insul.de

Insul is a municipality in the district of Ahrweiler, in Rhineland-Palatinate, Germany.
