= Leimbach, Ahrweiler =

Leimbach
- Municipality
- Coat of arms

- Location of Leimbach within Ahrweiler district
- Interactive map of Leimbach
- Location within Germany Location within Rhineland-Palatinate
- Coordinates: 50°24′15″N 6°55′36″E
- Country: Germany
- State: Rhineland-Palatinate
- District: Ahrweiler
- Municipal assoc.: Adenau

Government
  - Mayor (2019–24): Tim Leimbach

Area
  - Total: 15.64 km^{2} (6.04 sq mi)
- Elevation: 270 m (890 ft)

Population (2025-12-31)
  - Total: 422
  - Density: 27.0/km^{2} (69.9/sq mi)
- Time zone: UTC+01:00 (CET)
  - Summer (DST): UTC+02:00 (CEST)
- Postal codes: 53518
- Dialling codes: 02691
- Vehicle registration: AW

Leimbach (German: [ˈlaɪmbax]) is a municipality in the district of Ahrweiler, in Rhineland-Palatinate, Germany.
