= Echternacherbrück =

- Municipality
- Coat of arms

- Location of Echternacherbrück within Eifelkreis Bitburg-Prüm district
- Interactive map of Echternacherbrück
- Location within Germany Location within Rhineland-Palatinate
- Coordinates: 49°48′47″N 06°25′43″E
- Country: Germany
- State: Rhineland-Palatinate
- District: Eifelkreis Bitburg-Prüm
- Municipal assoc.: Südeifel

Government
  - Mayor (2019–24): Ralf Schrauf

Area
  - Total: 4.74 km^{2} (1.83 sq mi)
- Elevation: 175 m (574 ft)

Population (2025-12-31)
  - Total: 1,138
  - Density: 240/km^{2} (622/sq mi)
- Time zone: UTC+01:00 (CET)
  - Summer (DST): UTC+02:00 (CEST)
- Postal codes: 54668
- Dialling codes: 06525
- Vehicle registration: BIT
- Website: echternacherbrück.eu

Echternacherbrück is a German municipality located on the Sauer river opposite the Luxembourgish town of Echternach. It is part of the district Bitburg-Prüm, in Rhineland-Palatinate. It includes the district of Fölkenbach. One of its main places of interest is the "Liboriuskapelle", a chapel located on the slopes of the Ferschweiler plateau.
