= Wershofen =

- Municipality
- Coat of arms

- Location of Wershofen within Ahrweiler district
- Interactive map of Wershofen
- Location within Germany Location within Rhineland-Palatinate
- Coordinates: 50°26′38″N 6°48′47″E
- Country: Germany
- State: Rhineland-Palatinate
- District: Ahrweiler
- Municipal assoc.: Adenau

Government
  - Mayor (2019–24): Robert Johannes Zawada

Area
  - Total: 14.36 km^{2} (5.54 sq mi)
- Elevation: 495 m (1,624 ft)

Population (2025-12-31)
  - Total: 891
  - Density: 62.0/km^{2} (161/sq mi)
- Time zone: UTC+01:00 (CET)
  - Summer (DST): UTC+02:00 (CEST)
- Postal codes: 53520
- Dialling codes: 02694
- Vehicle registration: AW
- Website: www.wershofen-eifel.de

Wershofen is a municipality in the district of Ahrweiler, in Rhineland-Palatinate, Germany.
