= Ohlenhard =

- Municipality
- Coat of arms

- Location of Ohlenhard within Ahrweiler district
- Interactive map of Ohlenhard
- Location within Germany Location within Rhineland-Palatinate
- Coordinates: 50°26′34″N 6°46′4″E
- Country: Germany
- State: Rhineland-Palatinate
- District: Ahrweiler
- Municipal assoc.: Adenau

Government
  - Mayor (2019–24): Dirk Wassong

Area
  - Total: 5.01 km^{2} (1.93 sq mi)
- Elevation: 450 m (1,480 ft)

Population (2025-12-31)
  - Total: 125
  - Density: 25.0/km^{2} (64.6/sq mi)
- Time zone: UTC+01:00 (CET)
  - Summer (DST): UTC+02:00 (CEST)
- Postal codes: 53520
- Dialling codes: 02694
- Vehicle registration: AW

Ohlenhard is a municipality in the district of Ahrweiler, in Rhineland-Palatinate, Germany.
