= Barweiler =

- Municipality
- Coat of arms

- Location of Barweiler within Ahrweiler district
- Interactive map of Barweiler
- Location within Germany Location within Rhineland-Palatinate
- Coordinates: 50°21′27″N 6°51′55″E
- Country: Germany
- State: Rhineland-Palatinate
- District: Ahrweiler
- Municipal assoc.: Adenau

Government
  - Mayor (2019–24): Josef Thelen

Area
  - Total: 8.52 km^{2} (3.29 sq mi)
- Elevation: 470 m (1,540 ft)

Population (2025-12-31)
  - Total: 376
  - Density: 44.1/km^{2} (114/sq mi)
- Time zone: UTC+01:00 (CET)
  - Summer (DST): UTC+02:00 (CEST)
- Postal codes: 53534
- Dialling codes: 02691
- Vehicle registration: AW
- Website: www.barweiler.de

Barweiler is a municipality in the district of Ahrweiler, in Rhineland-Palatinate, Germany.
