= Rheinischer Zuckerrübensirup =

Rheinischer Zuckerrübensirup is a PGI protected sugar-beet syrup.
