= Antweiler =

- Municipality
- Coat of arms

- Location of Antweiler within Ahrweiler district
- Interactive map of Antweiler
- Location within Germany Location within Rhineland-Palatinate
- Coordinates: 50°24′33″N 6°49′53″E
- Country: Germany
- State: Rhineland-Palatinate
- District: Ahrweiler
- Municipal assoc.: Adenau

Government
  - Mayor (2019–24): Peter Richrath

Area
  - Total: 4.46 km^{2} (1.72 sq mi)
- Elevation: 289 m (948 ft)

Population (2025-12-31)
  - Total: 477
  - Density: 107/km^{2} (277/sq mi)
- Time zone: UTC+01:00 (CET)
  - Summer (DST): UTC+02:00 (CEST)
- Postal codes: 53533
- Dialling codes: 02693
- Vehicle registration: AW
- Website: www.antweiler.de

Antweiler is a municipality in the district of Ahrweiler, in Rhineland-Palatinate, Germany.
