= Grafschaft, Rhineland =

Grafschaft
- Municipality
- Flag Coat of arms

- Location of Grafschaft within Ahrweiler district
- Interactive map of Grafschaft
- Location within Germany Location within Rhineland-Palatinate
- Coordinates: 50°34′17″N 7°05′49″E
- Country: Germany
- State: Rhineland-Palatinate
- District: Ahrweiler

Government
  - Mayor (2020–28): Achim Juchem (CDU)

Area
  - Total: 57.55 km^{2} (22.22 sq mi)
- Elevation: 220 m (720 ft)

Population (2025-12-31)
  - Total: 10,788
  - Density: 187.5/km^{2} (485.5/sq mi)
- Time zone: UTC+01:00 (CET)
  - Summer (DST): UTC+02:00 (CEST)
- Postal codes: 53501
- Dialling codes: 02641; 02225 (Ortsteile Eckendorf und Gelsdorf)
- Vehicle registration: AW
- Website: www.gemeinde-grafschaft.de

Grafschaft is a municipality in the district of Ahrweiler, in Rhineland-Palatinate, Germany. It is situated approximately 20 km south of Bonn.

Grafschaft is famous for its Rheinischer Zuckerrübensirup, a PGI-protected sugar-beet syrup.

The following 17 villages belong to Grafschaft:

- Alteheck
- Beller
- Bengen
- Birresdorf
- Bölingen
- Eckendorf
- Esch
- Gelsdorf
- Holzweiler
- Karweiler
- Lantershofen
- Leimersdorf
- Niederich
- Nierendorf
- Oeverich
- Ringen
- Vettelhoven

The total population is 10,900 inhabitants (2020).

It has been used as a special stage for the Rallye Deutschland.

It contains the headquarters for Haribo; the company's head office moved there from Bonn in April 2018.
