= Adenau =

- Town
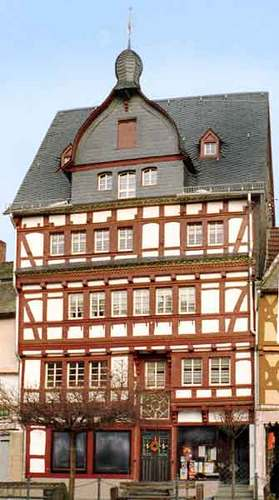
- 1630 Fachwerk house in marketplace

- Flag Coat of arms

- Location of Adenau within Ahrweiler district
- Interactive map of Adenau
- Location within Germany Location within Rhineland-Palatinate
- Coordinates: 50°23′N 6°56′E
- Country: Germany
- State: Rhineland-Palatinate
- District: Ahrweiler
- Municipal assoc.: Adenau

Government
  - Mayor (2019–24): Arnold Hoffmann (CDU)

Area
  - Total: 18.56 km^{2} (7.17 sq mi)
- Elevation: 300 m (980 ft)

Population (2025-12-31)
  - Total: 2,943
  - Density: 158.6/km^{2} (410.7/sq mi)
- Time zone: UTC+01:00 (CET)
  - Summer (DST): UTC+02:00 (CEST)
- Postal codes: 53511–53518
- Dialling codes: 02691
- Vehicle registration: AW
- Website: www.stadt-adenau.de

Adenau (German: [ˈaːdənaʊ]) is a town in the High Eifel in Germany. It is known as the Johanniterstadt because the Order of Saint John was based there in the Middle Ages. The town's coat of arms combines the black cross of the Electorate of Cologne with the lion of the lords of Nürburg. The northern loop of the Nürburgring lies just outside the town.

The Breidscheid section of Adenau was a separate municipality until 1952. The lords of Breidscheid are mentioned in the 13th century. The chapel of Breidscheid is dedicated to Saints Roch and Sebastian and was built in 1630 as a plague chapel.

== History ==
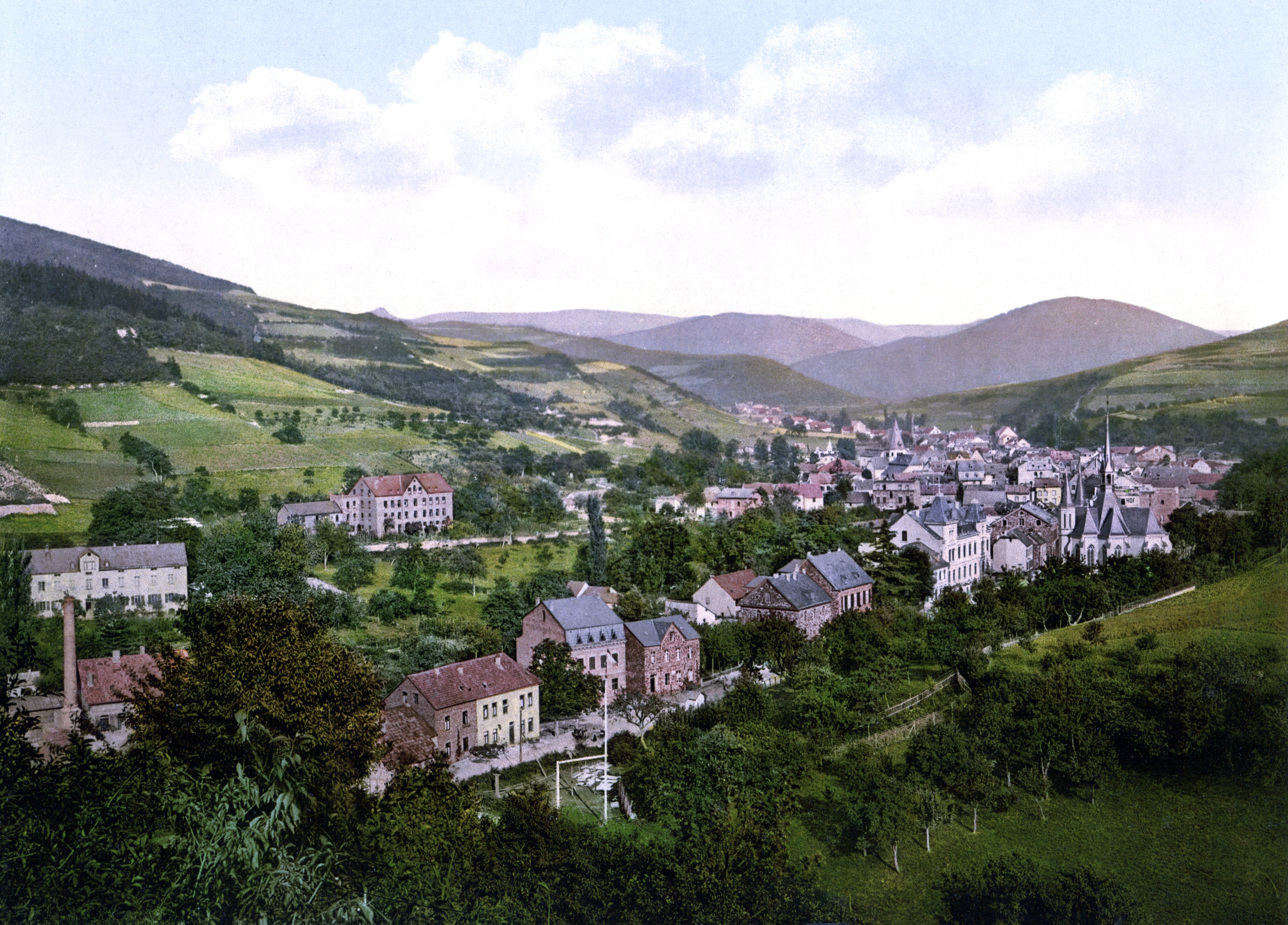
Adenau around 1900

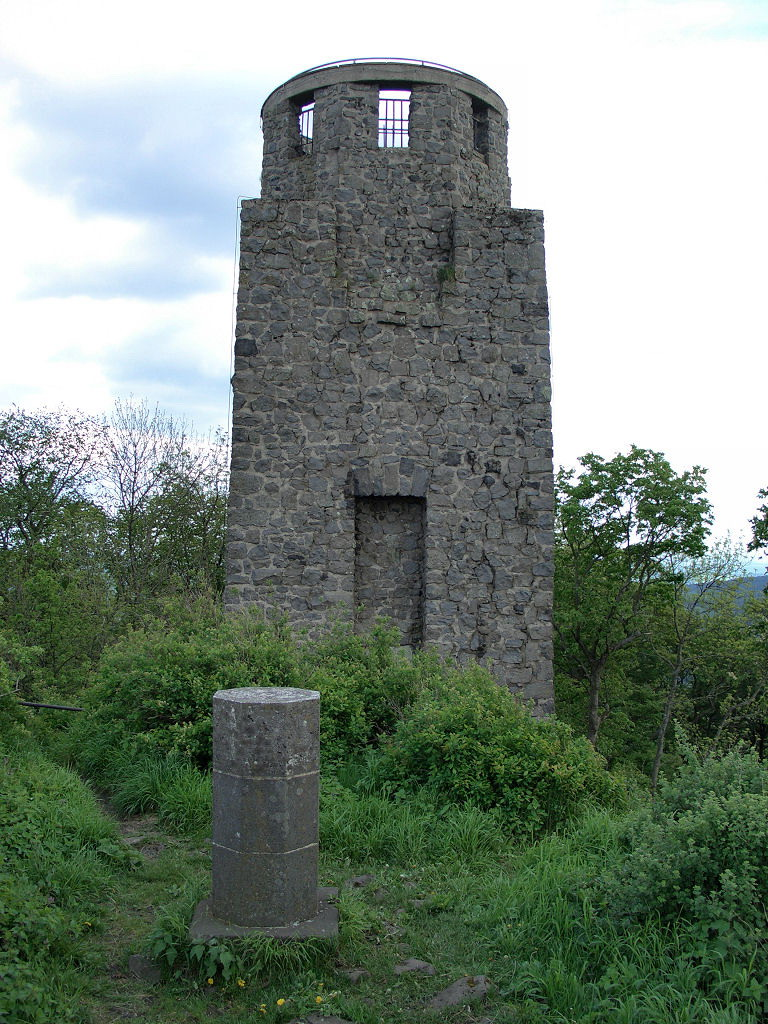
The Wilhem Tower on the Hohe Acht

Adenau is mentioned for the first time in 992, under the name Adenova. In 1162, Ulrich, Count of Are donated his manor to the Order of St. John (also called the Order of Malta). Adenau was the third oldest settlement of this order in Germany. The members of the order cared for paupers and pilgrims. Until 1518, the Komtur of the order also served as the parish priest.

In 1816 Adenau became the seat of an independent district. The District of Adenau was one of the poorest districts in Prussia. In 1927 the Nürburgring opened, built on the initiative of local magistrate Dr. Otto Creutz. In 1932 the district of Adenau was merged into the district of Ahrweiler.

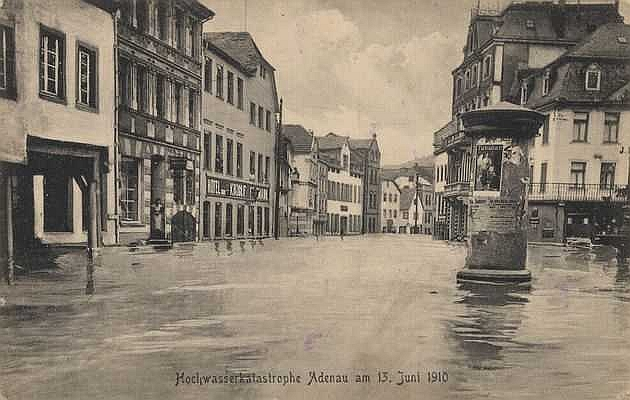
Adenau flood June 1910

== Destinations ==
- The Nürburgring
- The Hohe Acht

== Population development ==
The population development of Adenau refers to today's area of Adenau. The numbers 1871-1987 are census results:

Year	Inhabitants
1815	1,380
1835	1,631
1871	1,592
1905	2,002
1939	2,680
1950	2,869

Year	Inhabitants
1961	2,932
1970	3,105
1987	2,712
1997	3,031
2005	2,921
2025	2943

== Politics ==
The town council consists of 20 councillors and the local mayor.

- CDU: 12 seats
- ÖDP: 3 seats
- FDP: 2 seats
- SPD: 3 seats (situation: Local election on 25 May 2014)

== Schools ==
In Adenau, there are three schools: a primary, a secondary (Realschule) and a high school (Gymnasium). The Erich Klausener Gymnasium has 723 pupils and 46 teachers. The secondary school has 486 pupils. (Hauptschule) The primary school has 240 pupils and 21 teachers.

== Hohe Acht ==
The Hohe Acht is a tertiary volcano, the highest peak in the Eifel, rising 747 m above sea level. It is immediately east of Adenau. The Kaiser-Wilhelm-tower has stood on the peak since 1909. The tower was built from 1908 to 1909 on the occasion of the silver wedding of Emperor Wilhelm II and Empress Augusta Victoria. The 16.3 m high tower was designed by architect Freiherr von Tettau and became a protected monument in 1987. The tower offers extensive views of the Eifel landscape.

== Culture ==
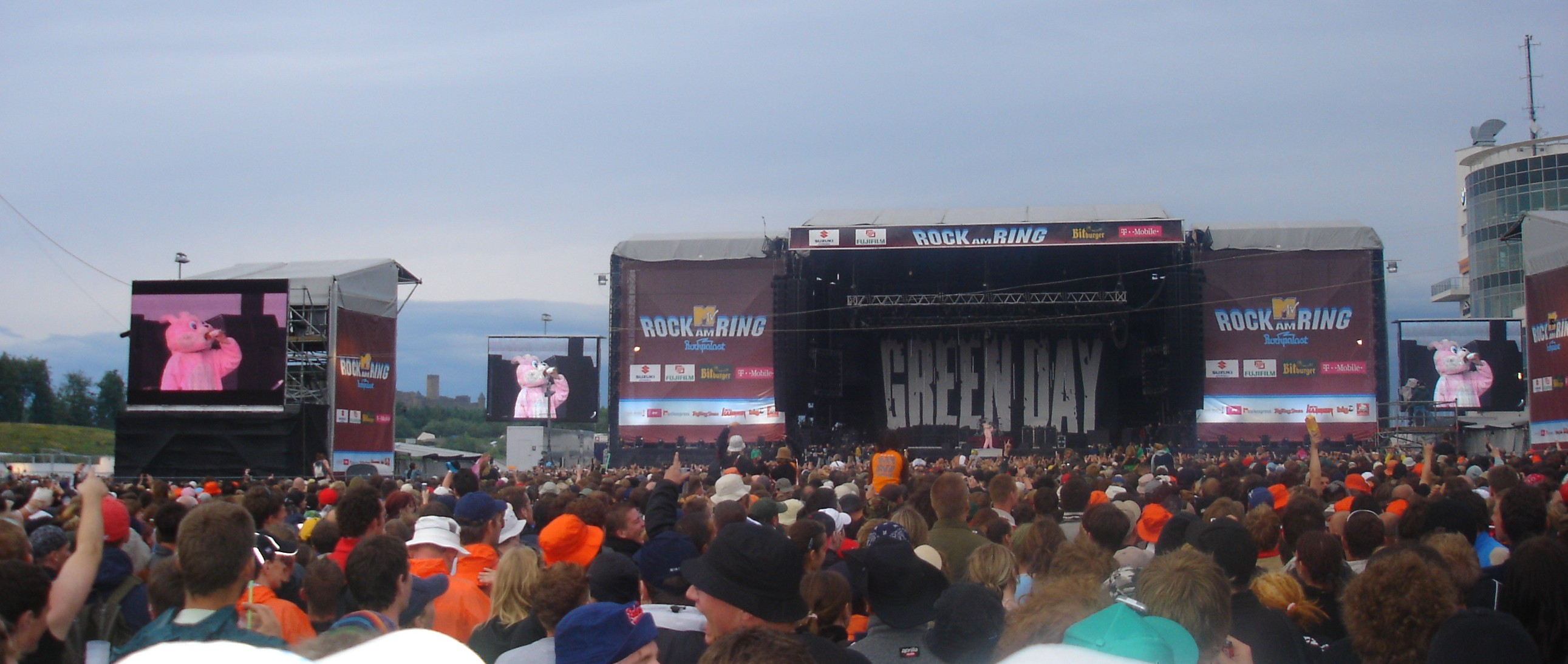
Rock am Ring, 2005

The international rock festival Rock am Ring is a major cultural event. Every year 80,000 or more people meet near Adenau to "rock". The event first took place in 1985, and was originally planned as a unique event. It was so successful, with 75,000 participants, that it was decided to make it an annual event. There has been one 2-year break since then after attendance numbers fell in 1988, after which the festival resumed in 1991 in a revised format with more emphasis on new acts. The camp associated with the festival is an important part of the experience.

Adenau is also known globally in the motorsports world from the name of the Adenau Bridge corner on the Nürburgring Nordschleife race circuit. The corner is about 9.5 km from the start of the circuit and is located to the south east of Adenau town.

== Twin towns — sister cities ==
Adenau is twinned with:

- Sillery, Marne, France
- Mellieħa, Malta
- Castione della Presolana, Italy

== Famous people ==
- Johann Nicola Baur (1808−1874) merchant and Prussian civil servant
- Clemens de Lassaulx (1809–1906), forester in Adenau, the "father of the Eifel"
- Erich Klausener (1885–1934), magistrate of the rural district of Adenau 1917–1919, shot by the Nazis in 1934
- Otto Wemper (1894–1969), forester, pioneer of reforestation of strip-mined sites, head of the Forestry Department at Adenau 1925–1940
- Max Funke (1895–1980), entrepreneur and inventor, founded Max Funke KG in Adenau 1951
- Bernhard Müller-Feyen (1931−2004), artist born in Adenau
- Marion von Haaren (born 1957), European correspondent with ARD, educated in Adenau
- Sabine Schmitz (1969–2021), Racing Driver and Television Personality, born in Adenau
- Torsten Jansen, handballer, born 1976 in Adenau
- Fabian Giefer, footballer, born 1990 in Adenau
- Christopher Theisen (born 1993), football player
- Rebecca Knaak (born 1996), football player for the Germany national team
- Nico Menzel (born 1997), racing driver

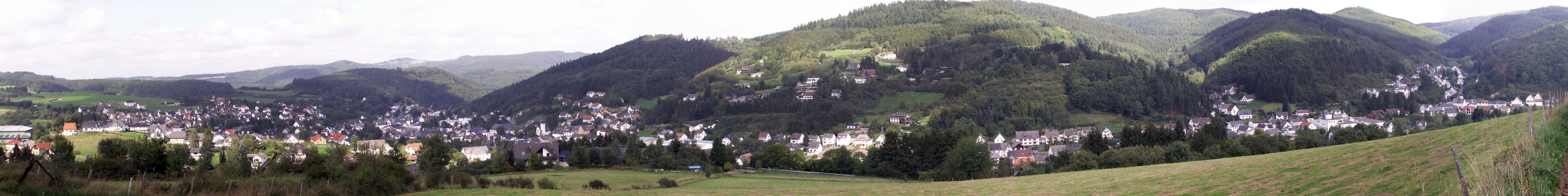
Panorama of Adenau, 2006
