= Dümpelfeld =

- Municipality
- Coat of arms

- Location of Dümpelfeld within Ahrweiler district
- Interactive map of Dümpelfeld
- Location within Germany Location within Rhineland-Palatinate
- Coordinates: 50°26′33″N 6°55′59″E
- Country: Germany
- State: Rhineland-Palatinate
- District: Ahrweiler
- Municipal assoc.: Adenau
- Subdivisions: 2

Government
  - Mayor (2019–24): Robert Reuter

Area
  - Total: 11.86 km^{2} (4.58 sq mi)
- Elevation: 240 m (790 ft)

Population (2025-12-31)
  - Total: 567
  - Density: 47.8/km^{2} (124/sq mi)
- Time zone: UTC+01:00 (CET)
  - Summer (DST): UTC+02:00 (CEST)
- Postal codes: 53520
- Dialling codes: 02691
- Vehicle registration: AW
- Website: www.duempelfeld-ahr.de

Dümpelfeld is a municipality in the district of Ahrweiler, in Rhineland-Palatinate, Germany.
