= Quiddelbach =

- Municipality
- Coat of arms

- Location of Quiddelbach within Ahrweiler district
- Interactive map of Quiddelbach
- Location within Germany Location within Rhineland-Palatinate
- Coordinates: 50°21′4″N 6°56′16″E
- Country: Germany
- State: Rhineland-Palatinate
- District: Ahrweiler
- Municipal assoc.: Adenau

Government
  - Mayor (2019–24): Petra Schmitz

Area
  - Total: 4.43 km^{2} (1.71 sq mi)
- Elevation: 460 m (1,510 ft)

Population (2025-12-31)
  - Total: 256
  - Density: 57.8/km^{2} (150/sq mi)
- Time zone: UTC+01:00 (CET)
  - Summer (DST): UTC+02:00 (CEST)
- Postal codes: 53518
- Dialling codes: 02691
- Vehicle registration: AW

Quiddelbach is a municipality in the district of Ahrweiler, in Rhineland-Palatinate, Germany. It is located within the Nürburgring Nordschleife racing circuit.
