= Ahrweiler (district) =

Coordinates: 50°32′N 7°5′E

- District
- Flag Coat of arms
- Country: Germany
- State: Rhineland-Palatinate
- Capital: Bad Neuenahr-Ahrweiler

Government
  - District admin.: Cornelia Weigand

Area
  - Total: 787 km^{2} (304 sq mi)

Population (31 December 2025)
  - Total: 129,763
  - Density: 165/km^{2} (427/sq mi)
- Time zone: UTC+01:00 (CET)
  - Summer (DST): UTC+02:00 (CEST)
- Vehicle registration: AW
- Website: www.kreis-ahrweiler.de

Ahrweiler (German pronunciation: [ˈaːɐ̯ˌvaɪlɐ]) is a district in the north of Rhineland-Palatinate, Germany. It is bounded by (from the north and clockwise) the districts of Euskirchen, Rhein-Sieg and the city of Bonn in the state of North Rhine-Westphalia, and the districts of Neuwied, Mayen-Koblenz and Vulkaneifel.

== History ==
The region was conquered by the Romans under Julius Caesar about 50 BC. Some hundred years later the Roman fort of Rigomagus (Gaulish for "king's field") was founded, later to become the city of Remagen. The Vinxtbach, a narrow brook and an affluent of the Rhine, was defined as the borderline between the Roman provinces of Germania superior and Germania inferior. There was originally a Roman villa here; the German suffix, "weiler", is from the Latin term "villare", meaning "land attached to a Roman villa, farm". Portions of a Roman aqueduct have also been found nearby.

Many towns were first mentioned in the 9th century, among them Sinzig and the eponymous village of Ahrweiler (since 1969 a part of Bad Neuenahr-Ahrweiler). The name of Ahrweiler was first noted in the Land Register of the Abbey of Prüm, which during the ninth century, owned almost all of the property in the town.

In 1180, the Holy Roman Emperor Barbarossa chose Sinzig as a place to meet the envoys of France and Flanders. Another significant place was the Abbey of Maria Laach on the Laacher See, a lake in the southeast of the district.

From 1100 to 1246, the district was ruled by the Grafen (Counts) von Are (Ahr), and then by their relatives, the Grafen von Hochstaden. These families were mainly responsible for the development of Ahrweiler, which then was, together with Bonn, Andernach and Nürburg, one of the capitals of the Archbishopric of Cologne. Defensive walls, ramparts and towers were built around the town, and these constructions remain mostly unimpaired.. In the early years of the Holy Roman Empire there was a county of Ahr, but it was annexed by the Bishop of Cologne in 1246. Afterwards Remagen became the most important town of the region. The parish church, St. Laurentius (St. Laurence) de:St. Laurentius (Ahrweiler), was originally built in 1269.

Since the Middle Ages, the town has been roughly divided by the four City Gates. In each division there was a commons, which originally belonged to the town's citizens. These were later put in the care of the protective Social Communities, who protected the interests of the inhabitants. These Social Communities (Hutengemeinschaften) continue to exist. They are: Hutengemeinschaft Adenbachhut Ahrweiler; Hutengemeinschaft "St. Barbara" Ahrhut Ahrweiler; Hutengemeinschaft "St. Katharina" Niederhut Ahrweiler; Hutengemeinschaft "St. Ursula" Oberhut Ahrweiler e.V..

During a disastrous period in the Thirty Years' War in the 17th century, the town was besieged, plundered and set on fire by the French. But the darkest day in Ahrweiler's history was on May 1, 1689, when the town was razed to the ground, and only ten houses were left standing among the ruins.

The districts of Ahrweiler and Adenau were established in 1816, just after Prussia occupied the Rhineland. The district of Adenau was merged with Ahrweiler in 1932.

The Ahrweiler City Gate and many other historical buildings were partially destroyed at the end of World War II during the contested advances of the Allies. The battle of the Rhine bridge of Remagen, otherwise known as the Ludendorff Bridge, in 1945, is a well-known event in local history, also due to the U.S. movie The Bridge at Remagen (1969).

The 2021 European floods heavily impacted Ahrweiler, where the Ahr river rose, killing at least 135 people.

=== Jewish history ===
In Jewish texts, the town was called Aroil'ra (ארוילרא). From the 13th century and on, there was a considerable Jewish community in Ahrweiler. In the 14th century, the Jews of the town traded in salt and wine. During that period, the Jewish community of the town suffered from the Black Death Jewish persecutions. In 1900, 65 Jews lived in the town (1% of the total population), and 319 in 1933.

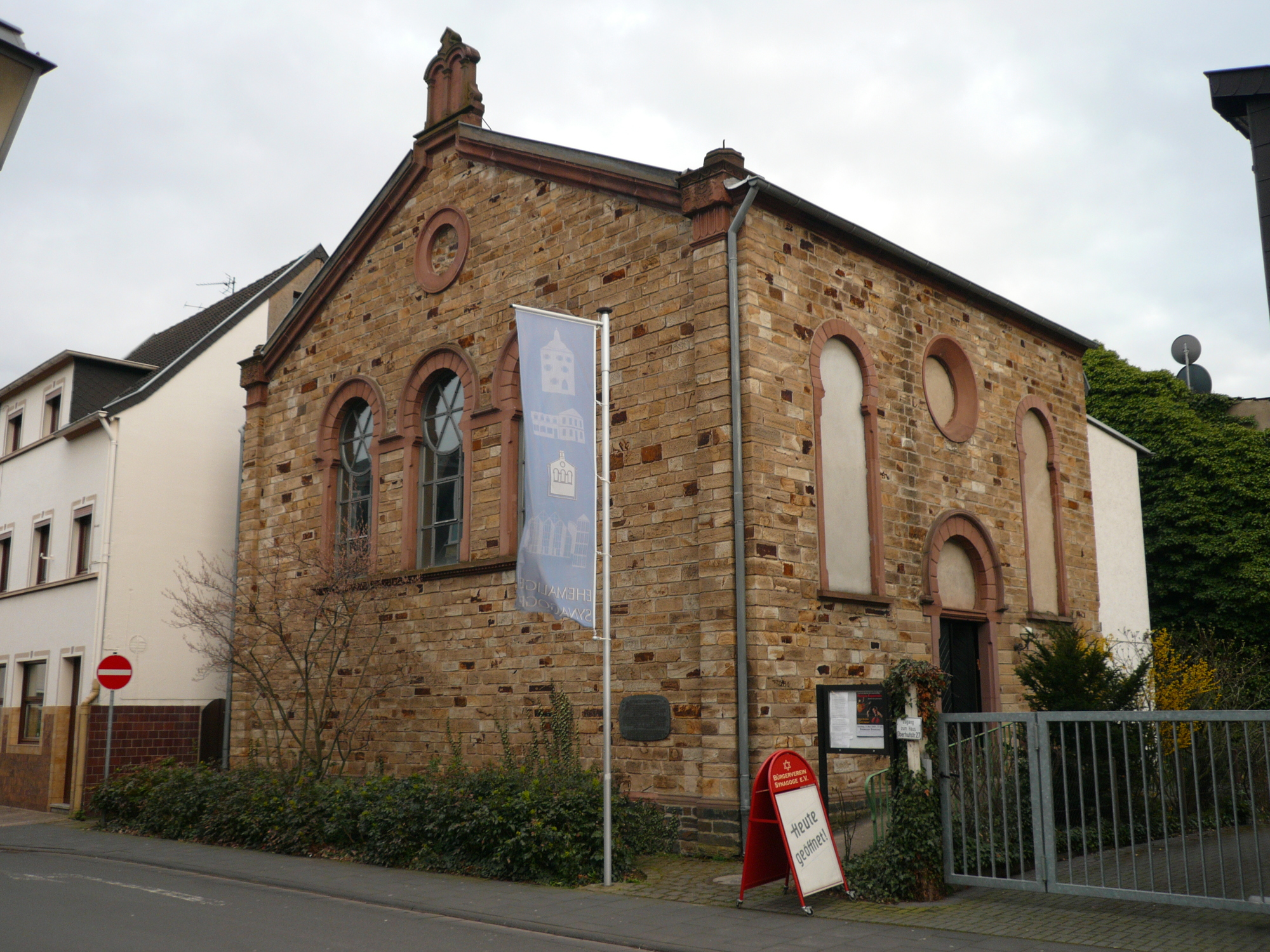
Ahrweiler Synagogue

Although much of the town resisted early National Socialism, and the town leaders had refused Adolf Hitler a chance to address the community in 1932, they were not able to escape the reach of the Nazis entirely. Ahrweiler had a small Jewish community before the Nazis came to power, but they were all taken away and relocated, some to concentration camps, after 1933. No member of this community ever returned to Ahrweiler, and today, the town's old synagogue that was desecrated during 1938 Kristallnacht, is used for art displays.

== Geography ==
The Rhine forms the eastern border of the district. The Ahr, a tributary of the Rhine, enters the district in the southeast and runs northeastwards to meet the Rhine within the borders of the district.

Ahrweiler is located in the northernmost part of the Eifel mountains. The mountains to the north of the Ahr are called the Ahr Hills; they are lower than the mountains of the High Eifel in the south of the district.

Walporzheim, one kilometre west of Ahrweiler, has some curious rock formations called the "Bunte Kuh" (Colorful Cow) and the "Kaiserstuhl" (Emperor's Chair).

The forests of the Eifel are the result of reforestations in the 19th century. The most common tree is the fir, which was originally not native to the region. The Ahr river and its smaller affluents serve as a habitat for rare animals, that are adapted to alluvial forests. Examples are the oriole, the nightingale and the endangered black kite. Some fens in the area were drained in the 20th century. The Rodder Maar, a lake in the eastern part of the district, was drained in the 1950s, and a coniferous forest was planted on the former water body; in 1998 the lake was restored, and rare animals begin to arrive there again. The geology of the lake is uncertain. In its circular shape it appears similar to volcanic maars that are found in the nearby Daum region, but there is no evidence of volcanism, and so it is not a "maar". In 2013 evidence that it is meteoritic in origin was presented.

Downtown Ahrweiler during Christmas

Ahrweiler Ahrberge

Ahrweiler is also characterised by orchards and vineyards. The lower Ahr River is one of the northernmost wine regions of Germany, known for its red wines from Pinot noir (Spätburgunder) and Portugieser.

Ahrweiler is especially well known for its vineyards and wineries. Wine growing and trading has been going on in Ahrweiler for over 1,000 years. The town is the chief cultivator for the red wine known as "Ahrburgunder". Bachem, which lies one kilometre south of Ahrweiler, is also well known for its "Frühburgunder", a local name for Pinot Noir Précoce. Traditionally, in this small town more of this wine is produced than in any other place in the Ahr valley.

On the first Sunday in September there is a traditional and annual wine festival in Ahrweiler, for which a "Wine Queen," or "Burgundia", is elected. Within the district are also the wine festival on the first Sunday in July at Bachem and another one in nearby Walporzheim on the first Sunday in August. By the way, Walporzheim also has the oldest wine house in the Ahr, named St. Peters, which dates from 1246.

The Nürburgring, a famous Formula One circuit, is located in the district.

== Coat of arms ==
The coat of arms was adopted in 1927. It displays:

- Top left: the cross of Cologne
- Top right: the heraldic eagle of the earldom of Ahr
- Bottom left: the lion of Berg
- Bottom right: the former coat of arms of the Prussian Rhine province

== Towns and municipalities ==
Clickable map of towns and municipalities in the district

Towns	Verbandsgemeinden
1. Bad Neuenahr-Ahrweiler; 2. Remagen; 3. Sinzig; Free municipality: 1. Grafschaft	1. Adenau; 1. Adenau^{1, 2}; 2. Antweiler; 3. Aremberg; 4. Barweiler; 5. Bauler; 6. Dankerath; 7. Dorsel; 8. Dümpelfeld; 9. Eichenbach; 10. Fuchshofen; 11. Harscheid; 12. Herschbroich; 13. Hoffeld; 14. Honerath; 15. Hümmel; 16. Insul; 17. Kaltenborn; 18. Kottenborn; 19. Leimbach; 20. Meuspath; 21. Müllenbach; 22. Müsch; 23. Nürburg; 24. Ohlenhard; 25. Pomster; 26. Quiddelbach; 27. Reifferscheid; 28. Rodder; 29. Schuld; 30. Senscheid; 31. Sierscheid; 32. Trierscheid; 33. Wershofen; 34. Wiesemscheid; 35. Wimbach; 36. Winnerath; 37. Wirft	2. Altenahr; 1. Ahrbrück; 2. Altenahr^{1}; 3. Berg; 4. Dernau; 5. Heckenbach; 6. Hönningen; 7. Kalenborn; 8. Kesseling; 9. Kirchsahr; 10. Lind; 11. Mayschoß; 12. Rech; 3. Bad Breisig; 1. Bad Breisig^{1, 2}; 2. Brohl-Lützing; 3. Gönnersdorf; 4. Waldorf; 4. Brohltal; 1. Brenk; 2. Burgbrohl; 3. Dedenbach; 4. Galenberg; 5. Glees; 6. Hohenleimbach; 7. Kempenich; 8. Königsfeld; 9. Niederdürenbach; 10. Niederzissen^{1}; 11. Oberdürenbach; 12. Oberzissen; 13. Schalkenbach; 14. Spessart; 15. Wassenach; 16. Wehr; 17. Weibern
^{1}seat of the Verbandsgemeinde; ^{2}town

== Transport ==
Verkehrsverbund Rhein-Mosel (VRM)

In the Ahrweiler district there are following railway lines:

- Linke Rheinstrecke, in service for passenger trains, long distance trains ICE, IC/EC and NJ as well as local trains (RE5, RB26, RB30, RB32)
- Brohl Valley Railway, in service for excursional special train rides, organized by the interest group Interessengemeinschaft Brohltal-Schmalspureisenbahn e. V.
- Ahr Valley Railway, in service, primarily local passenger train service (SPNV), lines RB30 and RB32
- Dümpenfeld-Lissendorf railway, out of service

The Ahrweiler district is located in the area of the transport association Verkehrsverbund Rhein-Mosel (VRM), additionally, the Rheinland-Tarif applies for train rides that have the start or end in the Rheinland-Tarif (former Verkehrsverbund Rhein-Sieg area).
