= Red Wine Trail =

Hiking trail in Germany

Coordinates: 50°33′23″N 7°13′03″E

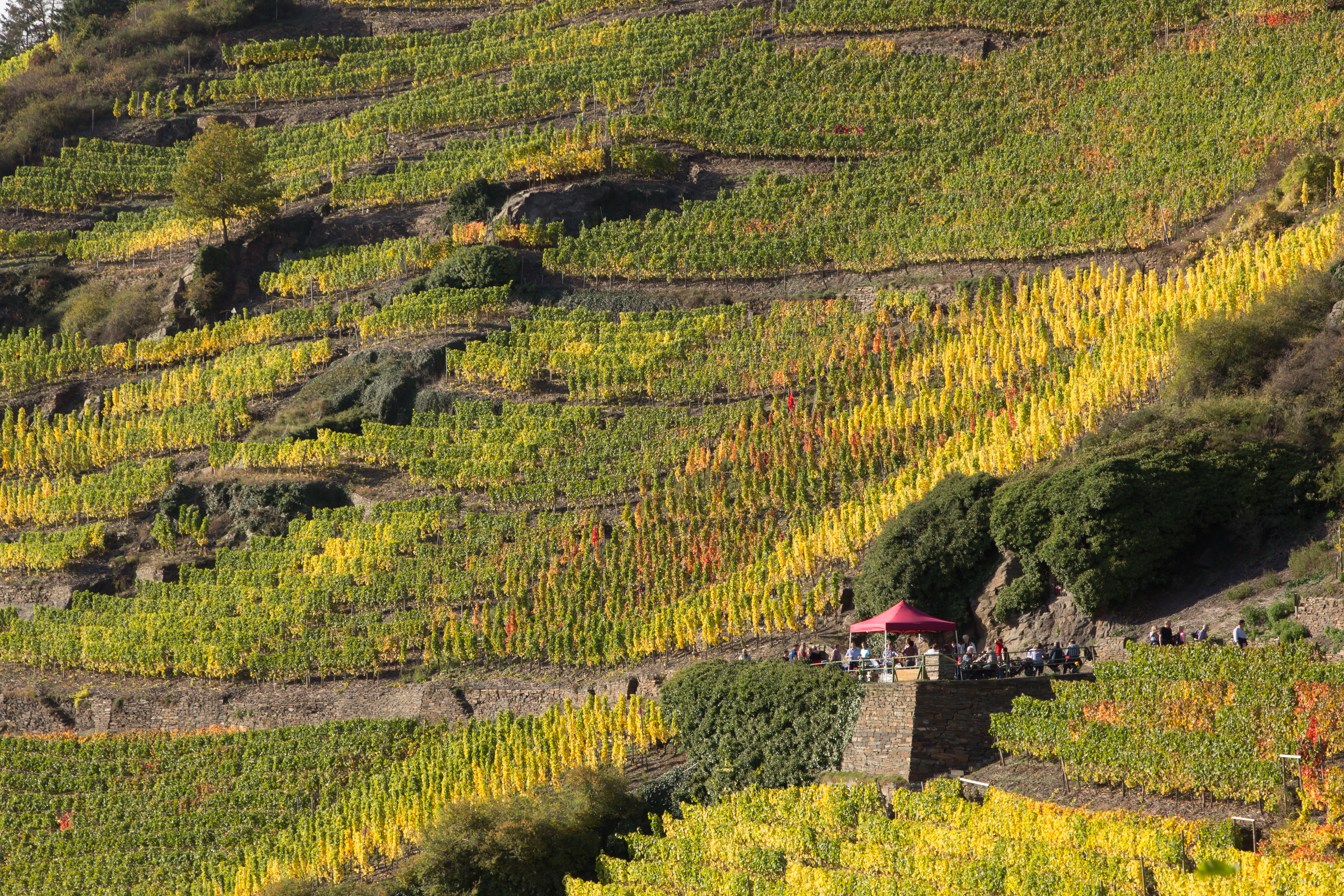
A wine kiosk on the Red Wine Trail near Mayschoß

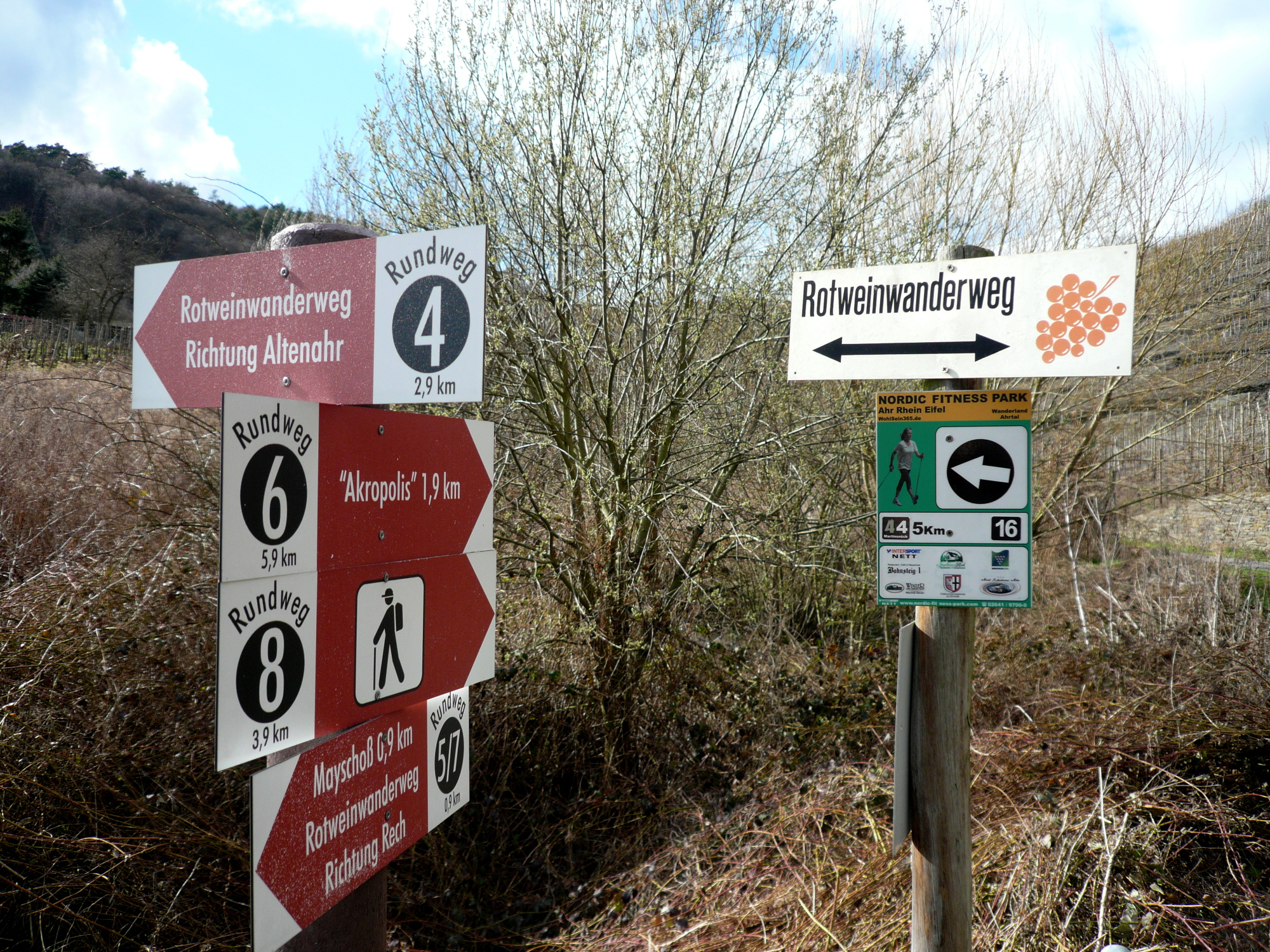
Waysign on the Red Wine Trail

The Red Wine Trail (Rotweinwanderweg), opened in 1972, is a trail that runs high above the floor of the Ahr Valley linking the wine villages of the Ahr wine region in Germany along the River Ahr. The route runs from Altenahr via Mayschoß, Rech and Dernau to the well known rock formation of Bunte Kuh near Walporzheim. The Red Wine Trail then continues to the former abbey of Marienthal. It then goes to the Government Bunker Documentation Site, the Roman villa near Ahrweiler, the memorial by the Silberberg Tunnel and continues via Heppingen to the station square of Bad Bodendorf.

Most of the trail runs through the open vineyards on the northern slopes of the Ahr Valley. Many parts of the path are tarmacked because they are used by agricultural vehicles so that special hiking equipment is not necessary.

At weekends and in the months of September and Oktober the hiking trail, which is the most popular in the Eifel, is very busy. During the grape harvest at the end of September and during events (running, wine festivals or firework displays) the path may be closed in places.

== Literature ==
- Christoph Lüttgen: Rotweinwanderweg . Eifel-Verlag, Cologne, 2012, ISBN 978-3-943123-02-9
- Peter Squentz: Die Ahr. Von der Mündung bis zur Quelle in 31 Tippeltouren. 31 Touren und der gesamte Rotweinwanderweg in drei Etappen. Cologne, 2000
- Vera Kettenbach: Das Ahrtal von Bad Bodendorf bis Altenahr. Gaasterland-Verlag, 3rd edn. Düsseldorf, 2010, ISBN 3-935873-02-6
