= Ahr Valley Railway =

Railway line in Germany

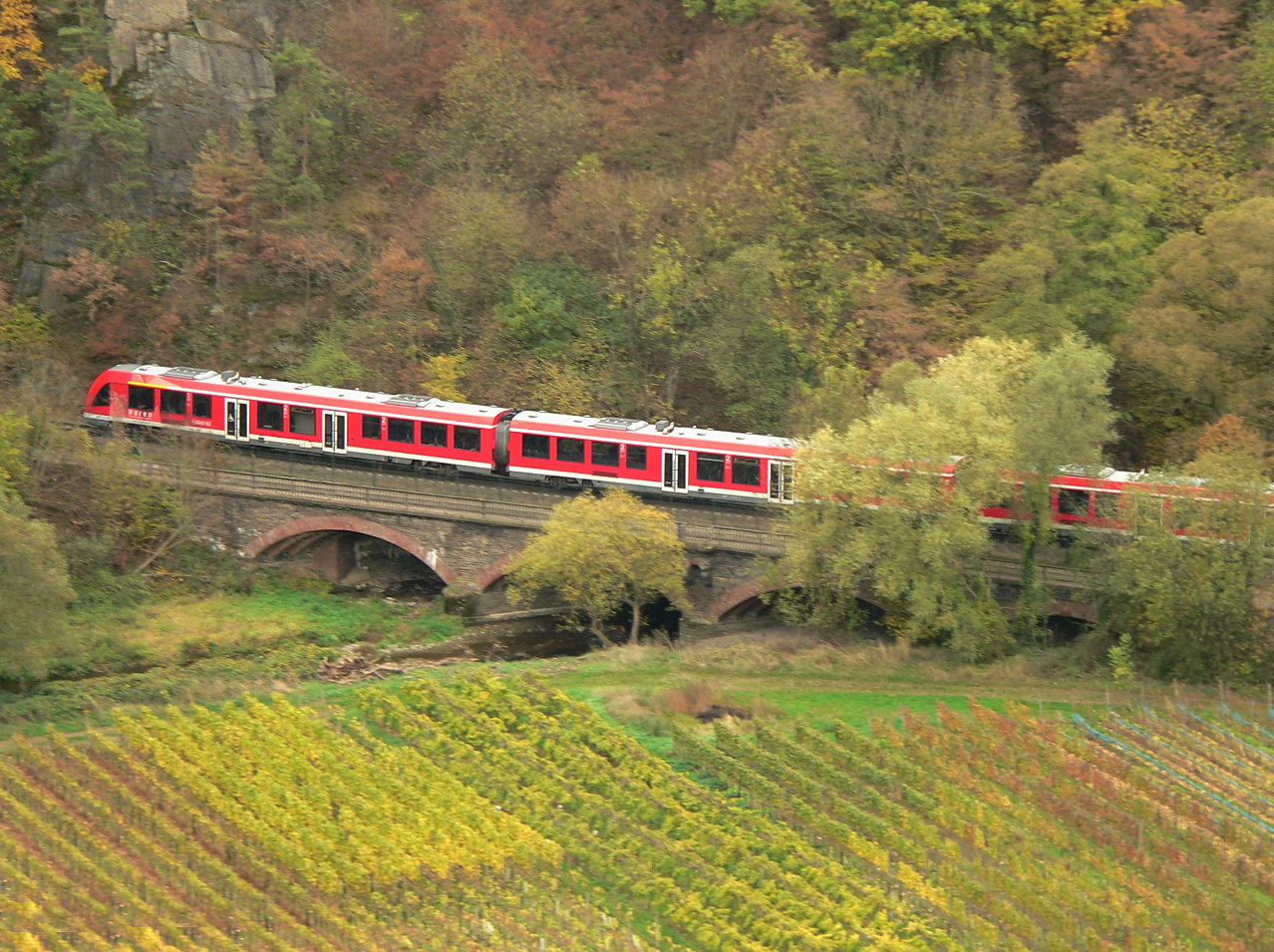
- A passenger train travelling on the Ahr Valley Railway

Overview
- Native name: Ahrtalbahn
- Line number: 3000
- Locale: Rhineland-Palatinate
- Termini: Remagen; Adenau

Service
- Route number: 477

Technical
- Line length: 42.4 km (26.3 mi)
- Number of tracks: 2: Remagen–Walporzheim crossover
- Track gauge: 1,435 mm (4 ft 8 1/2 in) standard gauge
- Electrification: 15 kV 16.7 Hz
Route map
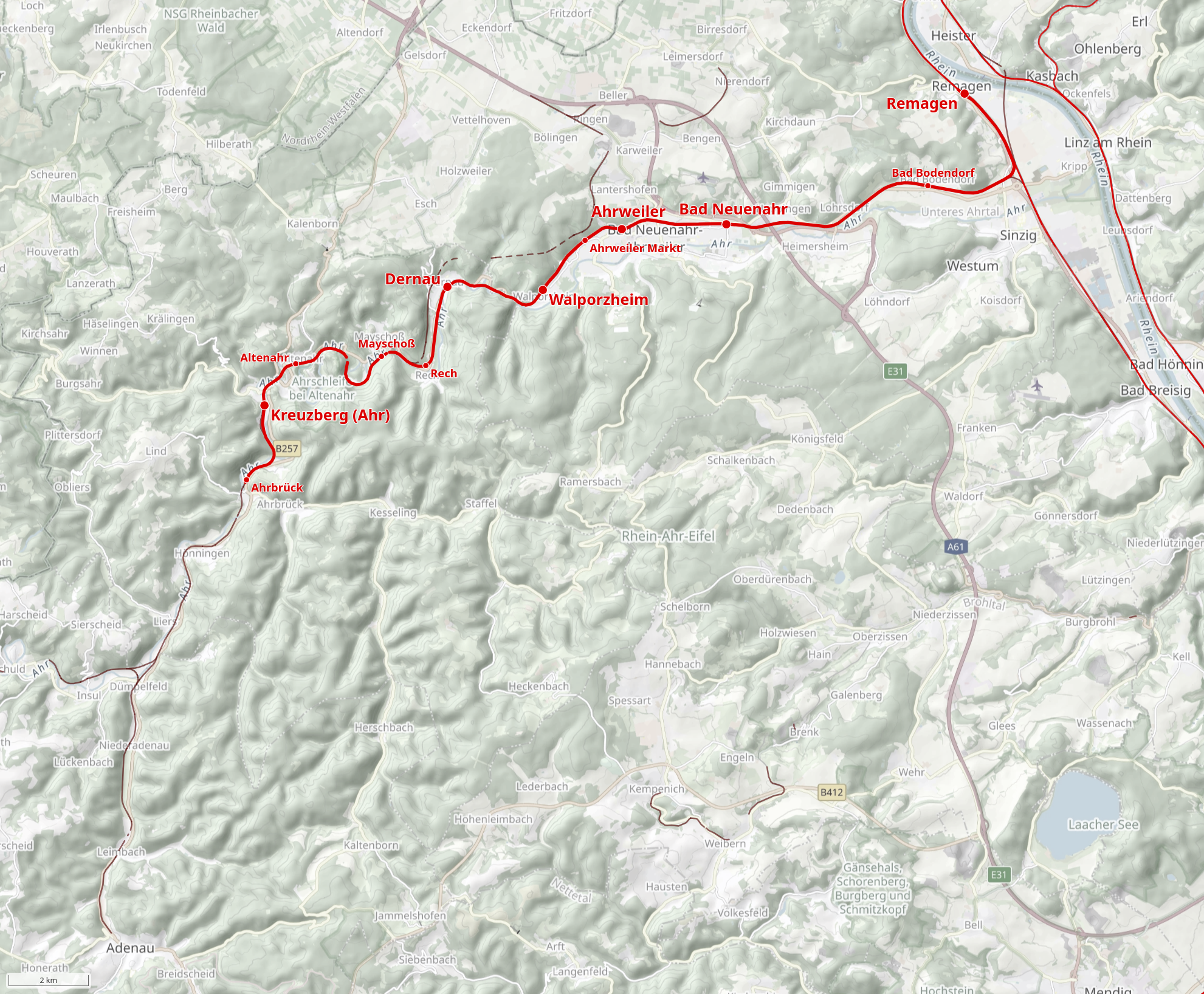
- Source: German railway atlas

The Ahr Valley Railway (German: Ahrtalbahn), Remagen–Ahrbrück, is currently a 29 km-long, partly single-track and electrified branch line, which runs through the Ahr valley from Remagen via Ahrweiler and Dernau to Ahrbrück in the German state of Rhineland-Palatinate. It is served by two Regionalbahn services and is included in Deutsche Bahn timetable route number 477.

== History ==
The history of the Ahr Valley Railway begins as a branch line of the West Rhine Railway (Linke Rheinstrecke). This line was built up the Rhine from Cologne to Rolandseck via Bonn by the Bonn–Cologne Railway Company (Bonn-Cölner Eisenbahn-Gesellschaft) between 1844 and 1856; it was extended to Bingerbrück via Remagen and Koblenz by the Rhenish Railway Company (Rheinische Eisenbahn-Gesellschaft) in 1858/59.

On 23 September 1879, a ministerial decree was issued to authorise the building of the Ahr Valley Railway. Less than a year later, the Rhenish Railway opened the first section from Remagen to Ahrweiler on 17 September 1880. This was extended to Altenahr on 1 December 1886 and to Adenau on 15 July 1888.

For strategic reasons, two other lines were added in the Ahr valley in 1912 and 1913, establishing a small Ahr Valley Railway network. In 1912, the Dümpelfeld–Hillesheim (Eifel)–Lissendorf line was opened; this followed the upstream half of the Ahr and then branched off into the Ahlbach valley at Ahrdorf. The third side a triangle of railways was built to connect the two lines (the Dümpelfeld curve from Liers junction to Insul junction).

In 1913, the Ahrdorf–Blankenheim railway was opened; this ran up the rest of the Ahr valley from Ahrdorf to its source and then connected with the Eifel Railway.

There was a locomotive depot (Bahnbetriebswerk) in the middle of the line at Kreuzberg and lying parallel with it. At the same time, the original line was partially relocated and the Ahr Valley Railway was double-tracked from Remagen to Liers junction.

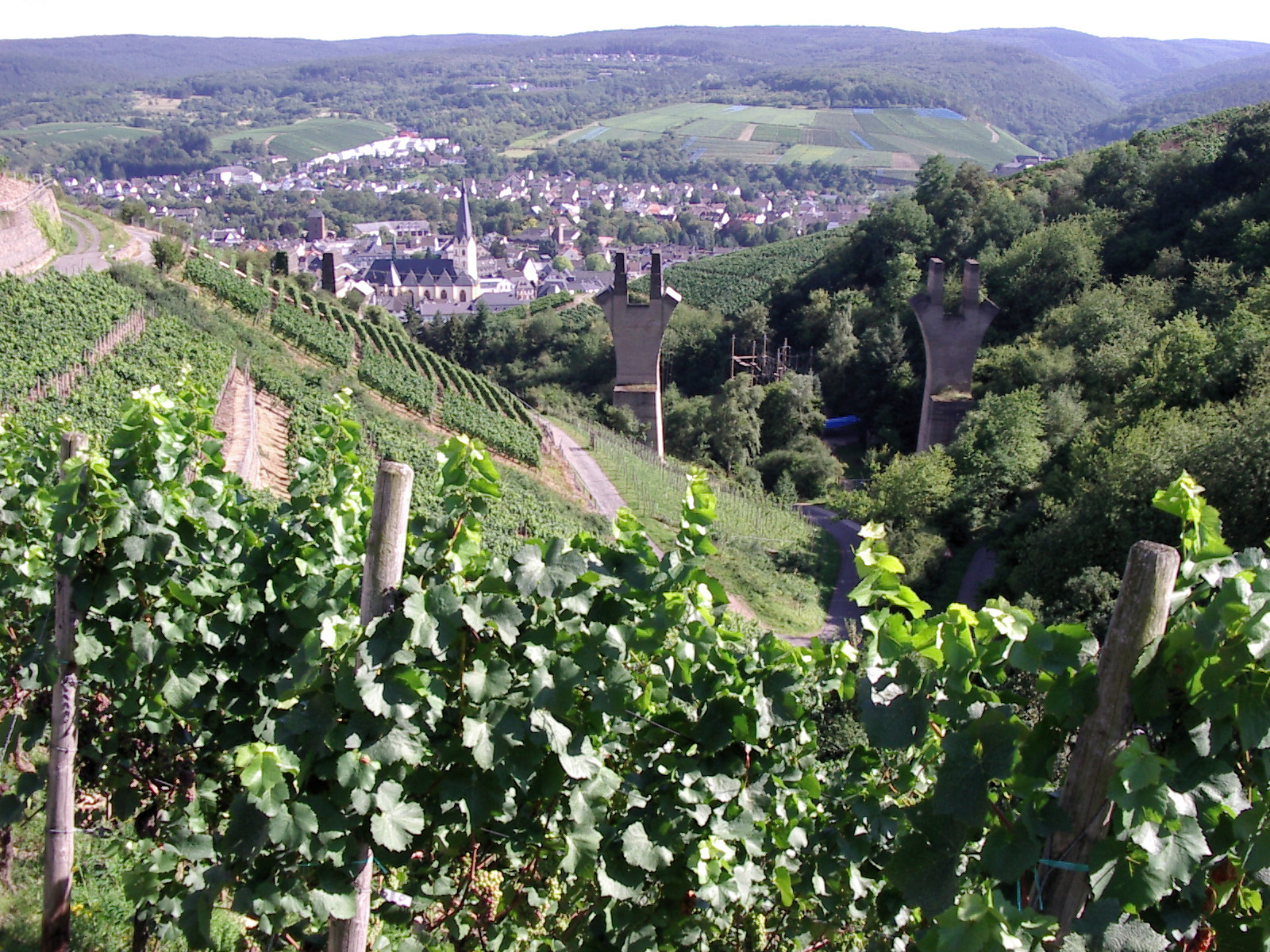
The unfinished Adenbach bridge on the unfinished Strategic Railway above Ahrweiler Markt station

Construction was commenced on other new lines, such as the "strategic railway" that was intended to connect the Ahr valley from Dernau with Neuss via Rheinbach and Liblar bypassing Cologne, but they were not completed due to the First World War and the subsequent disarmament imposed under the peace treaty. The unfinished bridge at Ahrweiler has been in ruins above the village since 1925. During the Second World War, the already completed tunnels in the Ahr valley were used for the armaments industry, using forced labour, and were redeveloped between 1960 and 1972 as the German federal government bunker. The A 61 autobahn now runs on part of the line near Meckenheim and Rheinbach.

An extension south of Adenau did not complete its planning stage. Again, the main reasons for building the line would have been of a military nature.

Also for strategic reasons, the Ahr Valley Railway was extended over the Ludendorff Bridge (also known as the Bridge at Remagen) to connect with the East Rhine Railway (Rechte Rheinstrecke) to and from the north. However, the bridge was not completed until 1918. It was not rebuilt after its collapse just before the war ended in 1945.

The construction of the Siegfried Line gave the Ahr Valley railways great strategic importance. Therefore, it was heavily damaged by Allied air raids and by German demolitions with explosives during the Second World War. Nevertheless, the line was fully reopened by 1951. In the following years it was then partially closed and dismantled.

Limited passenger services were restored between Remagen and Kreuzberg on 2 June 1985 and extended to Ahrbrück (formerly Brück (Ahr)) in June 1996. Freight traffic between Hönningen (Ahr) and Adenau was abandoned on 31 May 1985. Freight traffic between Ahrbrück and Hönningen (Ahr) was abandoned on 31 December 1996 and the line to Hönningen (Ahr) was dismantled in order to build a bypass road.

The Ahr Valley Railway is still double-tracked until the Walporzheim crossover.

In the late 1990s, trains on the line were hauled by diesel locomotives of classes 213 and 215; Class 628 and later Bombardier Talent (class 622) diesel multiple units were also operated. In December 2013 LINT 81 (DB Class 620) took over the service scheduled for 20 years as part of the Vareo-branded regional rail network.

The disused former second track between Mayschoß and Rech is now used for a rail trail, the Ahr-Radweg (Ahr Cycleway). The two adjoining branch lines are partially used as cycle ways.

On 14 July 2021 the water level of the Ahr rose to its highest level since 1910 as part of the 2021 European floods. Subsequently, seven bridges and about 20 km of track were destroyed. Passenger train service was suspended until further notice. On 8 November 2021, train service resumed between Remagen and Ahrweiler, and on 10 December 2021 to Walporzheim, while the section between Walporzheim and Ahrbrück remained out of service. The line fully reopened in December 2025 after repairs were completed. The line was electrifed at the same time.

== Service & Fares ==
Until December 2025, passenger services were part of the Vareo network. The RB 30 (Bonn Hbf - Remagen - Ahrbrück) and RB 39 (Remagen - Dernau) both operated hourly. These services were run by DB Regio NRW using diesel multiple units of the Alstom Coradia LINT family.

After the line reopened on 14 December 2025, the RB 39 was discontinued and replaced by the RB 32. This new service runs hourly between Ahrbrück and Remagen, with trains continuing every two hours onward via Koblenz to Boppard. However for now, until around autumn 2026, the RB 32 is expected to operate only between Altenahr and Boppard, since the construction of a retaining wall near Heimersheim requires the line to run single-track in that section. The service is operated by Trans Regio using Siemens Mireo trains.

The RB 30 was switched to Bombardier Talent 2 trains on 15 March 2026.

Rail services on the Ahr Valley Railway can be used with tickets of both the Verkehrsverbund Rhein-Mosel (VRM) and the Verkehrsverbund Rhein-Sieg (VRS), as well as the NRW-Tarif, a fare system that applies throughout North Rhine-Westphalia.
