= Bad Neuenahr-Ahrweiler =

- Town
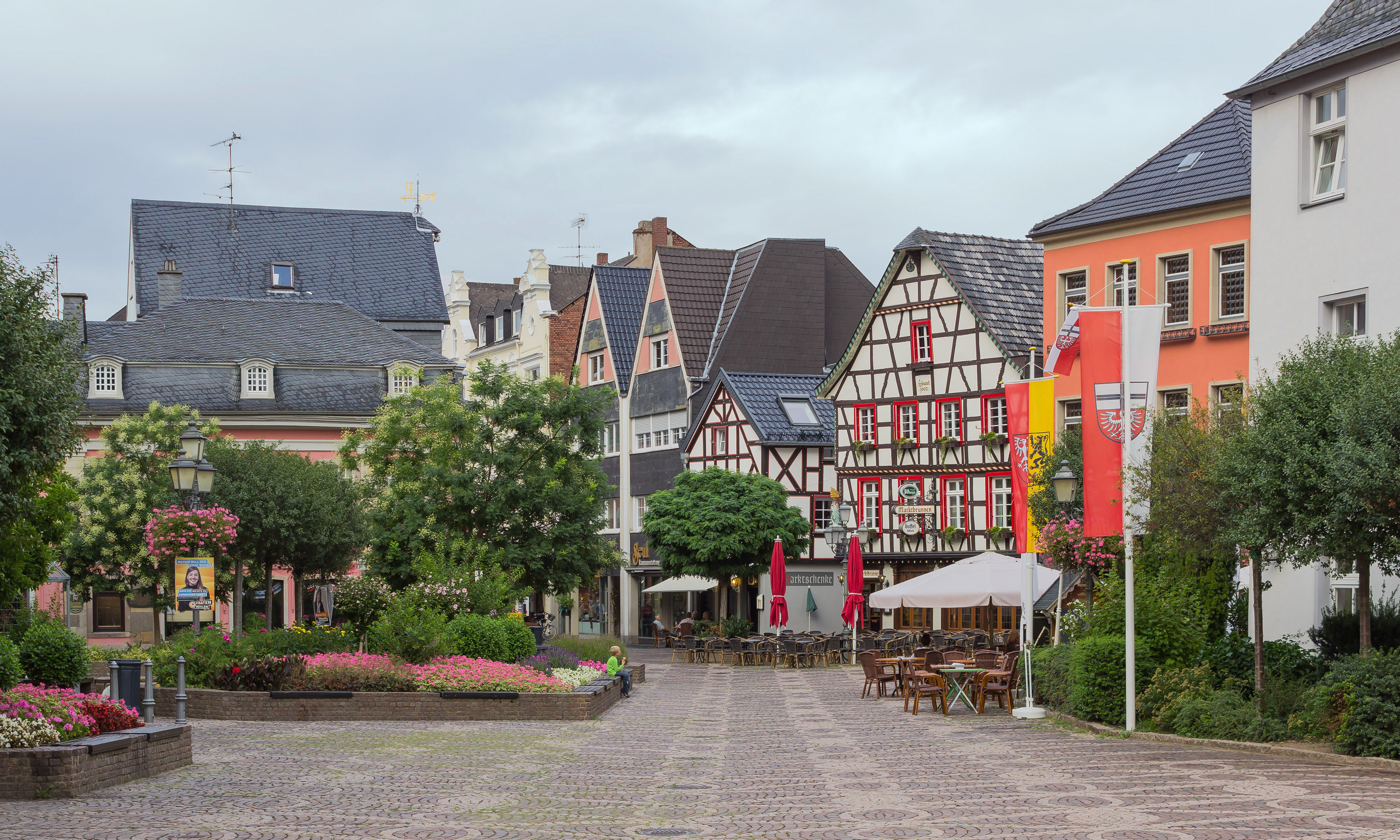

- Coat of arms

- Location of Bad Neuenahr-Ahrweiler within Ahrweiler district
- Interactive map of Bad Neuenahr-Ahrweiler
- Location within Germany Location within Rhineland-Palatinate
- Coordinates: 50°32′41″N 7°6′48″E
- Country: Germany
- State: Rhineland-Palatinate
- District: Ahrweiler
- Subdivisions: Ortsbezirke 13

Government
  - Mayor (2026–32): Pascal Rowald (CDU)

Area
  - Total: 63.38 km^{2} (24.47 sq mi)
- Elevation: 99 m (325 ft)

Population (2025-12-31)
  - Total: 28,264
  - Density: 445.9/km^{2} (1,155/sq mi)
- Time zone: UTC+01:00 (CET)
  - Summer (DST): UTC+02:00 (CEST)
- Postal codes: 53474
- Dialling codes: 02641; 02646
- Vehicle registration: AW
- Website: www.bad-neuenahr-ahrweiler.de

Bad Neuenahr-Ahrweiler (German pronunciation: [baːt ˌnɔʏənʔaːɐ̯ˈʔaːɐ̯vaɪlɐ]) is a spa town in the German Bundesland of Rhineland-Palatinate that serves as the capital of the Ahrweiler district. The A61 motorway connects the town with cities like Cologne and Mainz. Formed by the merging of the towns (now districts) of Bad Neuenahr and Ahrweiler in 1969, Bad Neuenahr-Ahrweiler consists of 11 such districts.

== Geography ==
Bad Neuenahr-Ahrweiler rests in the Ahr valley (German: Ahrtal) on the left bank of the Rhine river in the north of Rhineland-Palatinate. Bad Neuenahr-Ahrweiler nestles in the Ahr Hills (German: Ahrgebirge).

The highest hill in the area is the Häuschen at 506 metres (1,660 ft) above sea level. Nearby are the hills of Steckenberg, Neuenahrer, and Talerweiterung. There used to be castles on the last two of these hills.

=== Neighbouring communities ===
Bad Neuenahr-Ahrweiler is surrounded by the following villages and towns (clockwise from the north): Grafschaft, Remagen, Sinzig, Königsfeld, Schalkenbach, Heckenbach, Kesseling, Rech and Dernau. The nearest cities are Bonn and Koblenz.

=== Districts ===
Bad Neuenahr is divided into Ortsbezirke which consist of one or more districts. The Ortsbezirke are represented by local councils. The largest district, Bad Neuenahr, was originally made up of three communities, which are still seen as districts.

Population statistics as of 31 March 2013 (main and secondary residence):

Local District	Subdivision	Population (30 June 2015)
Ahrweiler	District: Ahrweiler	7,411
Bachem	District: Bachem	1,214
Bad Neuenahr	Districts: Beul, Hemmessen and Wadenheim	12,132
Gimmigen	District: Gimmigen	735
Heimersheim	District: Heimersheim and Ehlingen	3,194
Heppingen	District: Heppingen	873
Kirchdaun	District: Kirchdaun	368
Lohrsdorf	District: Lohrsdorf and Green	672
Ramersbach	District: Ramersbach	567
Walporzheim	District: Walporzheim and Marienthal	698

=== Climate ===
Climate data for Bad Neuenahr-Ahrweiler (1991-2020)
Month	Jan	Feb	Mar	Apr	May	Jun	Jul	Aug	Sep	Oct	Nov	Dec	Year
Record high °C (°F)	16.9 (62.4)	20.7 (69.3)	25.4 (77.7)	30.5 (86.9)	33.4 (92.1)	36.4 (97.5)	40.4 (104.7)	38.9 (102.0)	34.5 (94.1)	28.5 (83.3)	22.4 (72.3)	19.0 (66.2)	40.4 (104.7)
Mean daily maximum °C (°F)	5.9 (42.6)	7.3 (45.1)	11.4 (52.5)	15.9 (60.6)	19.8 (67.6)	22.9 (73.2)	25.2 (77.4)	25.1 (77.2)	20.7 (69.3)	15.5 (59.9)	10.0 (50.0)	6.5 (43.7)	15.5 (59.9)
Daily mean °C (°F)	2.9 (37.2)	3.5 (38.3)	6.5 (43.7)	10.2 (50.4)	14.1 (57.4)	17.2 (63.0)	19.2 (66.6)	18.7 (65.7)	14.7 (58.5)	10.5 (50.9)	6.5 (43.7)	3.6 (38.5)	10.6 (51.1)
Mean daily minimum °C (°F)	−0.3 (31.5)	−0.2 (31.6)	2.1 (35.8)	4.6 (40.3)	8.4 (47.1)	11.6 (52.9)	13.5 (56.3)	13.1 (55.6)	9.6 (49.3)	6.0 (42.8)	2.9 (37.2)	0.5 (32.9)	6.0 (42.8)
Record low °C (°F)	−20.3 (−4.5)	−21.8 (−7.2)	−14.1 (6.6)	−6.4 (20.5)	−2.7 (27.1)	1.6 (34.9)	4.0 (39.2)	4.5 (40.1)	0.1 (32.2)	−7.0 (19.4)	−12.5 (9.5)	−20.1 (−4.2)	−21.8 (−7.2)
Average precipitation mm (inches)	46.0 (1.81)	42.0 (1.65)	48.0 (1.89)	39.0 (1.54)	58.0 (2.28)	60.0 (2.36)	62.0 (2.44)	64.0 (2.52)	53.0 (2.09)	49.0 (1.93)	46.0 (1.81)	53.0 (2.09)	620.0 (24.41)
Source: wetterlabs.de: Bad Neuenahr-Ahrweiler

== History ==
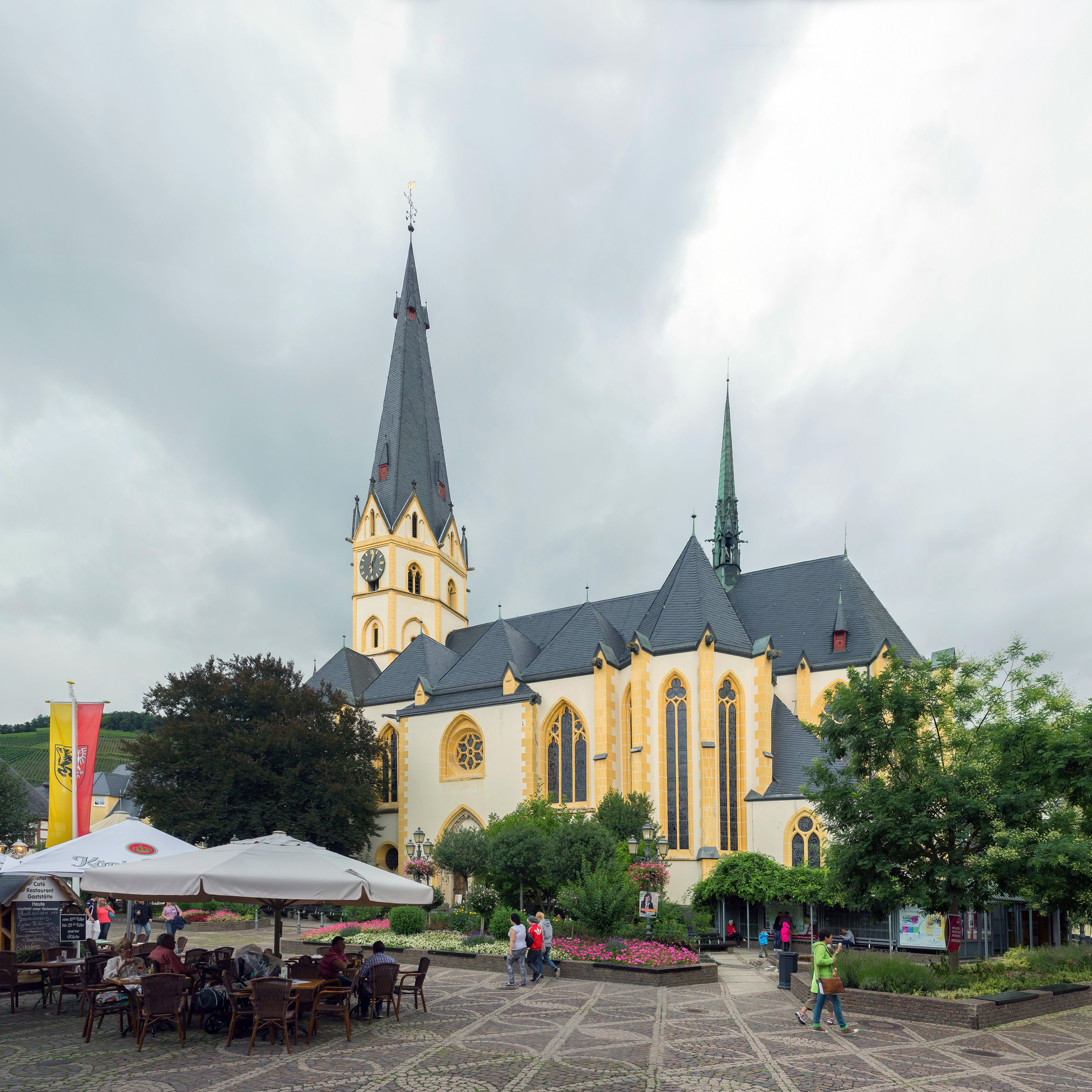
Ahrweiler, St. Laurentius Church

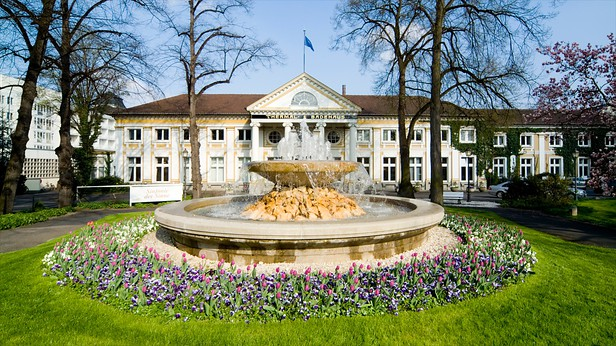
Thermal Badehaus und Kurhaus from Bad Neuenahr

Coat of arms of the Counts of Neuenahr

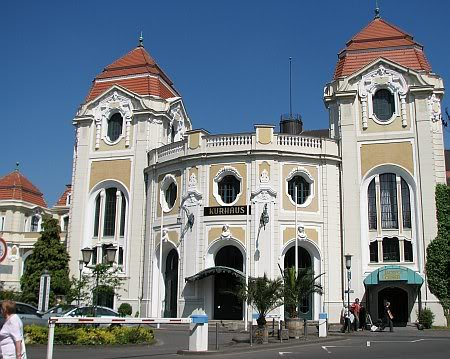
Casino from Bad Neuenahr

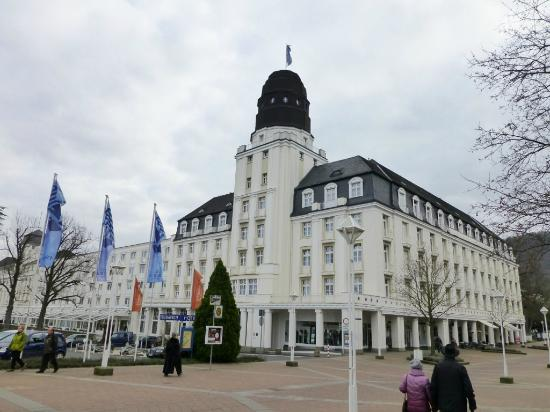
Luxury Steigenberger Hotel in Bad Neuenahr in autumn time

=== Antiquity ===
Discoveries dating to the Hallstatt period (1000–500 BC) show farming activity by Celts that dwelled in the area.

The Gallic Wars (58–50 BC) resulted in the forced relocation of the indigenous Eburones to the Middle Rhine.

Several Roman antiquities were discovered in the region and date from the 1st to 3rd centuries.

Most notable is the Villa Rustica of Bad Neuenahr, which, today is open to the public and serves as a museum (Museum Römervilla).

=== Middle Ages ===
In 893 AD, Ahrweiler was mentioned as Arwilre, Arewilre, Arewilere, and later Areweiller in the Prüm Urbar (register of estates owned by Prüm Abbey). The abbey of Ahrweiler owned a manor with 24 farmsteads; 50 acres of farmland and 76 acres of vineyards. The first mention of a parish church occurred in Neuenahr Castle and surrounding county (Newenare) from 1204 to 1225. In 1246 was founded one of the oldest German inns Gasthaus Sanct Peter. During this period, the area was ruled by German Counts von Neuenahr until 1587, until they went extinct in the male line.

=== Modern times ===
Close to Bad Neuenahr-Ahrweiler, the national Government bunker was built between 1960 and 1972 inside two abandoned railway tunnels that were built as part of the Strategic Railway. The bunker was maintained and kept in a working condition for about 30 years and decommissioned in 1997. The location is a museum since February 2008.

During the 2021 European floods much of the town was submerged and many died.

== Economy ==
- The German Army's (German: Deutsches Heer) Logistics Centre (main depot) is located in an underground facility.
- Bad Neuenahr-Ahrweiler has been home to the traditional mineral water "Heppinger" since 1584.
- The "Apollinaris" mineral water company was founded in Bad Neuenahr in 1852.

== Transport ==
The town has five stations on the Ahr Valley Railway and provides hourly connections to Bonn.

== Sport ==
- Bad Neuenahr-Ahrweiler is the home of the successful women's football team, SC 07 Bad Neuenahr.

== Twin towns – sister cities ==
Bad Neuenahr-Ahrweiler is twinned with:

- Brasschaat, Belgium

== Notable people ==
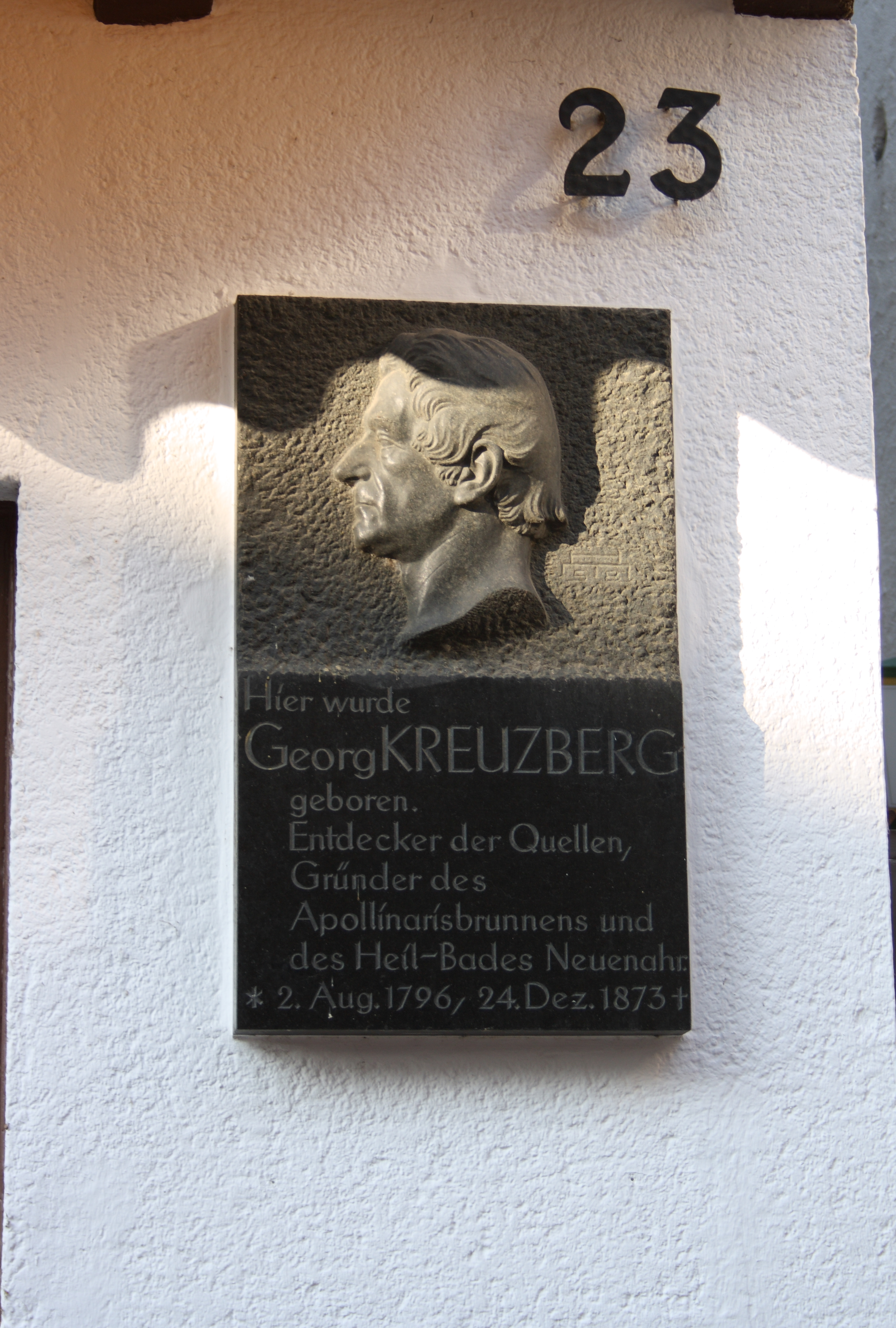
Ahrweiler Marktplatz 23 Memorial plate birthplace Georg Kreuzberg

- Cyrillus Jarre (1878–1952), Franciscan Archbishop in Jinan
- Markus Stenz (born 1965), conductor
- Björn Glasner (born 1973), cyclist
- Jan van Eijden (born 1976), cyclist
- Pierre Kaffer (born 1976), racing driver
- Bianca Rech (born 1981), footballer
- Hendrik Still (born 1987), racing driver
- Ricarda Funk (born 1992), canoeist

=== Associated with the town ===
- Karl Marx (1818–1883), philosopher and economist, stayed in a spa resort in Bad Neuenahr in 1877
- Ludwig van Beethoven (baptised 17 December 1770 – 26 March 1827), is said to have visited the town in his youth. The Beethovenhaus is named in his honor.
- Peter Friedhofen (1819–1860), founder of the Charitable Brethren of Maria Hilf, who practiced his trade first in Ahrweiler
- Wolfgang Müller von Königswinter (1816–1873), novelist and poet, died in Bad Neuenahr
- Blandine Merten (1883–1918), Ursuline nun near Ahrweiler
- Ebba Tesdorpf (1851–1920), illustrator and watercolorist, died in Ahrweiler
- Paul Metternich (1853–1934), diplomat, died in the district of Heppingen
- Max von Schillings (1868–1933), composer and conductor
- Christian Hülsmeyer (1891–1957), inventor, physicist and entrepreneur, died in Ahrweiler
