= Sanct Peter =

Historic guest house in Rhineland-Palatinate, Germany

Gasthaus Sanct Peter
- Industry: Hotel
- Founded: 1246
- Headquarters: Walporzheimer Strasse 134, 53474 Bad Neuenahr-Ahrweiler
- Website: www.sanct-peter.de

Gasthaus Sanct Peter is a historic guest house located in Ahr wine region in Bad Neuenahr-Ahrweiler, Rhineland-Palatinate, Germany. It is one of Germany's Top 100 restaurants and has a tradition of culture and hotel services from 1246. The name was given by Cologne Cathedral lords, the inn owners until 1805. In 20th century the entire Sanct Peter estate was acquired by the Brogsitter family, which lived in the Ahr Valley for over 400 years.

== See also ==
- List of oldest companies
