= Dümpelfeld–Lissendorf railway =

Closed railway line in Germany

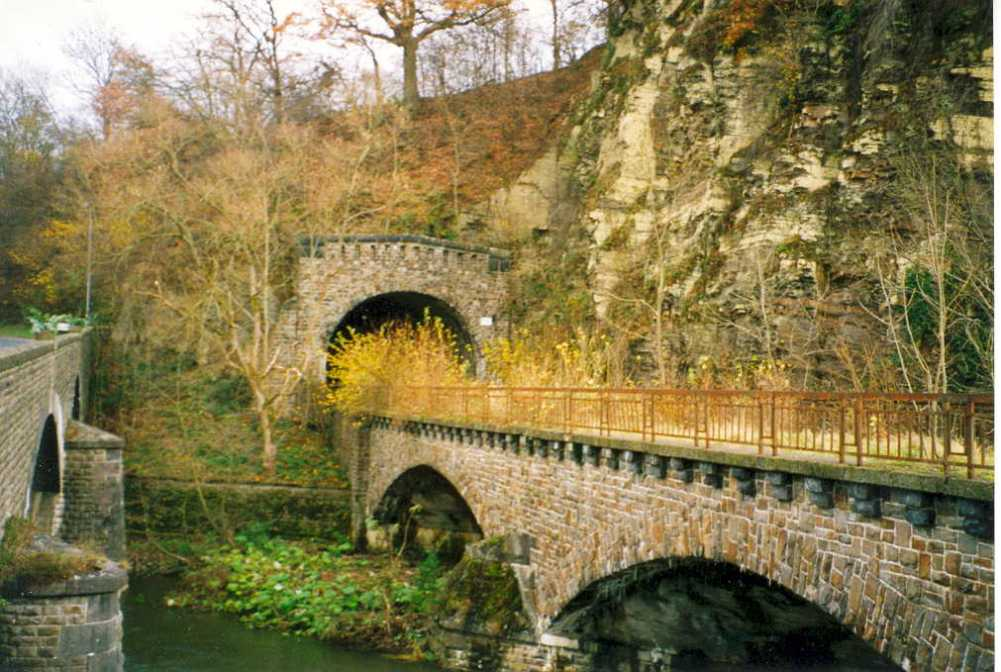
- Line near Schuld

Overview
- Line number: 3002
- Locale: Rhineland-Palatinate, Germany

Technical
- Line length: 44 km (27 mi)
- Track gauge: 1,435 mm (4 ft 8 1/2 in) standard gauge
Route map
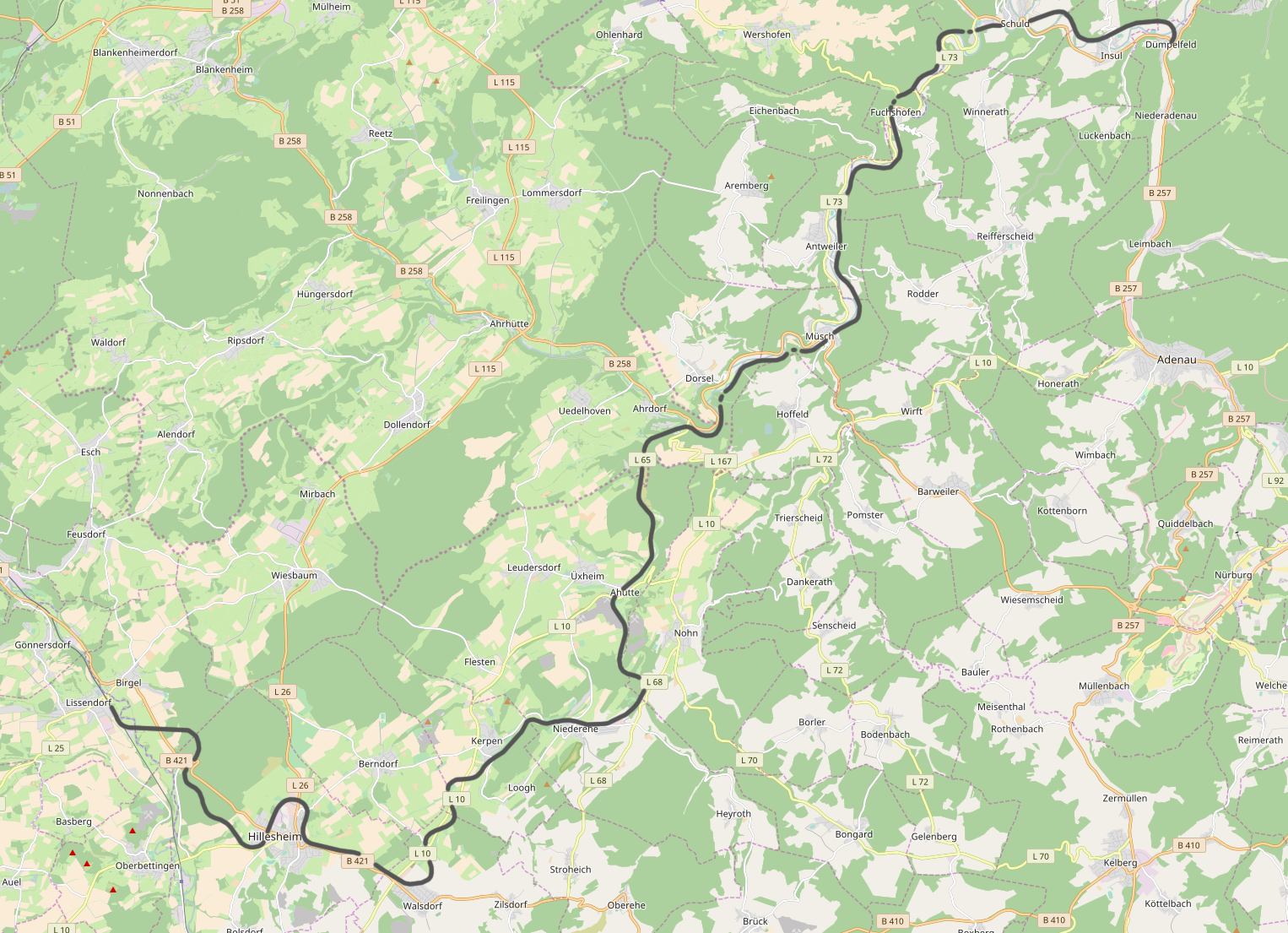
Operating points and lines

The Dümpelfeld–Lissendorf railway was a non-electrified branch line that lay mostly in what is now the German state of Rhineland-Palatinate. Only a few kilometres of the line near Ahrdorf station ran through North Rhine-Westphalia, which was created in 1946.

== History ==
The railway line was planned together with the Jünkerath–Weywertz railway (also called the Vennquerbahn, "Cross-Venn Railway") in 1900 as a strategic railway to connect the Ahr Valley Railway (Ahrtalbahn) with the Eifel Railway. The actual construction started in April 1909. On 30 June 1912, the 44 km route was opened, with the Dümpelfeld–Insul junction section built as a single-track line and the Insul junction–Jünkerath section built as a double-track line. The construction costs totalled 13.2 million marks.

Except during the two world wars, the line never had national importance, therefore it has been operated at times under Signalisierter Zugleitbetrieb (SZB, a system of train control for low-speed branch lines using simplified signalling technology).

At the end of the Second World War, many bridges were blown up by the Wehrmacht. The reconstruction went on for several years until 1948, when the whole line had been fully restored to traffic. The Lissendorf–Jünkerath section was shut down and dismantled after 1945, with traffic directed over the parallel Eifel line. Henceforth the remaining line was only one track, the second track had been dismantled to provide reparations.

The Dümpelfeld–Lissendorf passenger service was abandoned on 3 June 1973. Freight traffic on the Dümpelfeld-Hillesheim route ended on 30 September 1973 and the line was then dismantled. The remaining Hillesheim–Lissendorf section was finally closed in late 1982 and later dismantled.

The Insul–Schuld and Dorsel–Fuchshofen sections are now used as a rail trail, the Ahr-Radweg (Ahr Cycleway).
