= Strategic Railway Embankment =

Coordinates: 51°04′44″N 6°42′30″E

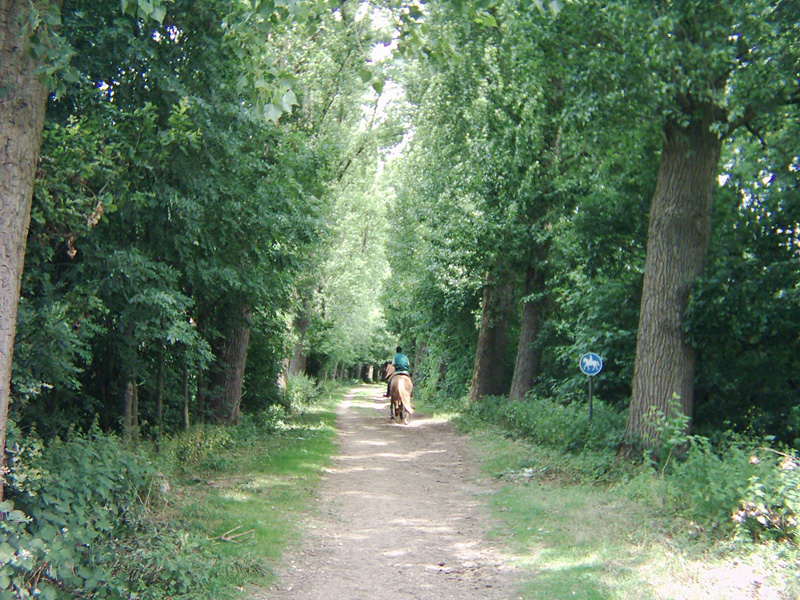
Strategic Railway Embankment towards the north-west behind Hülchrath.

The Strategic Railway Embankment (German: Strategischer Bahndamm) is a railway line between the Ruhr and the south-western border of Germany, which was never finished. This name is derived from the section of this line that runs over a railway embankment between Neuss and Rommerskirchen, which was built as part of the northern section of the line.

== History ==
At the beginning of the 20th century, railways were increasingly involved in the strategic considerations of the military, particularly for the rapid deployment of German troops against France. Under the influence of the Chief of the Imperial German General Staff, Alfred von Schlieffen, a whole series of new railway lines were planned as strategic railways and partly built. The Strategic Railway Embankment (or "Ruhr–Moselle relief line") was one of them.

== Route ==
The imperial government determined that the strategic railway would be double track from its junctions with the railways of the Ruhr and bypass the railway bottlenecks of Düsseldorf and Cologne, running from Neuss via Rommerskirchen, Niederaußem, Horrem, Liblar and Rheinbach to Rech in the Ahr valley. Trains would then run via the Ahr Valley Railway and the Eifel Railway to the Saarland and Lorraine. In 1915, it was also decided that the "Ruhr–Moselle relief line" would connect in a southerly direction over the Ringen–Bad Bodendorf section, continuing via the Ahr Valley Railway directly to the Rhine valley lines (West and East Rhine Railways) and the Remagen railway junction.

== Implementation ==
Construction of the line started in 1904. After the First World War, France prevented its completion in 1924. An embankment, including bridges for crossing over transport routes, had been completed over a length of about 13 km between Holzheim and Rommerskirchen. The line from Rommerskirchen via Niederaussem to Liblar was already traffickable and the Bergheim District railway (Bergheimer Kreisbahn) had operated over it for several years.

Sections of the line were also completed in the Rheinbach/Meckenheim area (such as embankments and cuttings) and flyovers and a railway tunnel at Ahrweiler. Piers were built for the viaduct over the Adenbach valley near Ahrweiler. When construction was stopped, scaffolding had already been prepared for pouring concrete for the arches. Rails had not yet been laid. Individual station buildings had been erected. For example, the station building at Altendorf near Meckenheim was built in 1920 and served as a residence until it was demolished in 1968/69 for Autobahn construction.

== Sections ==
=== Neuss–Rommerskirchen section ===
The section of the strategic railway between Neuss and Rommerskirchen is now used as a foot and bridle path and is a heritage site. Streets and lanes were built over bridges to avoid intersections. These structures like the railway embankment have been largely unused for about 80 years. The Museum Insel Hombroich is near its northern end.

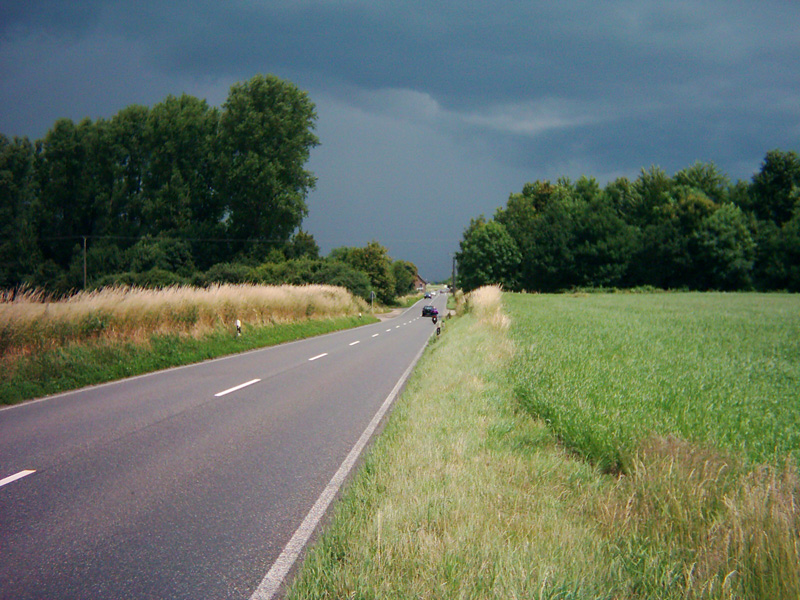
The strategic railway in Rhein-Kreis Neuss between Hülchrath (left) and Neukirchen (right). The L 142 intersects the strategic railway to the north-east.

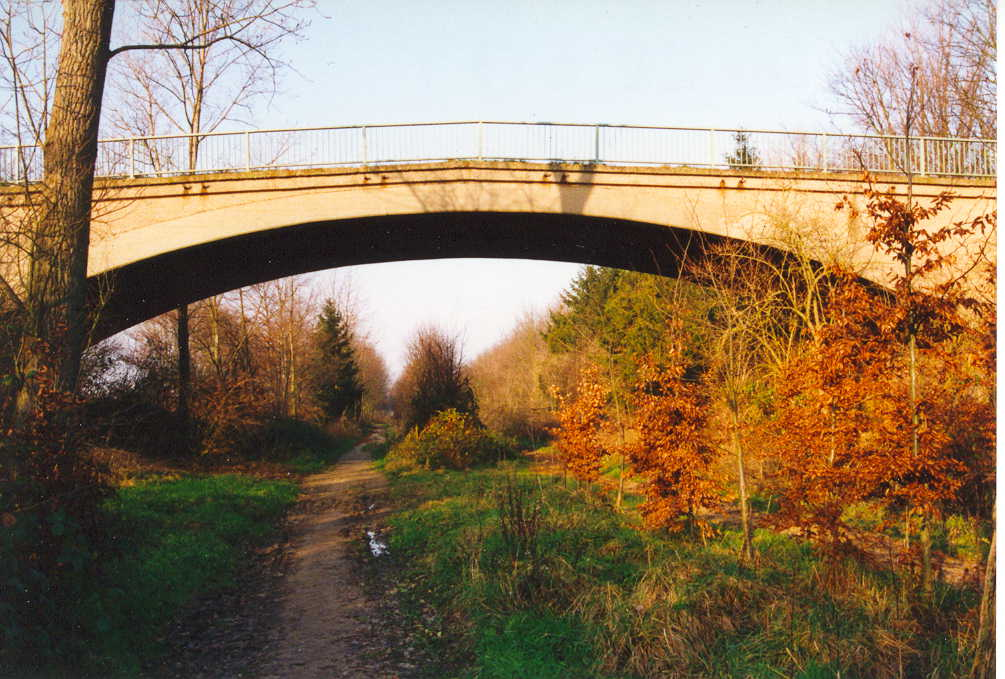
Road bridge over the strategic railway.

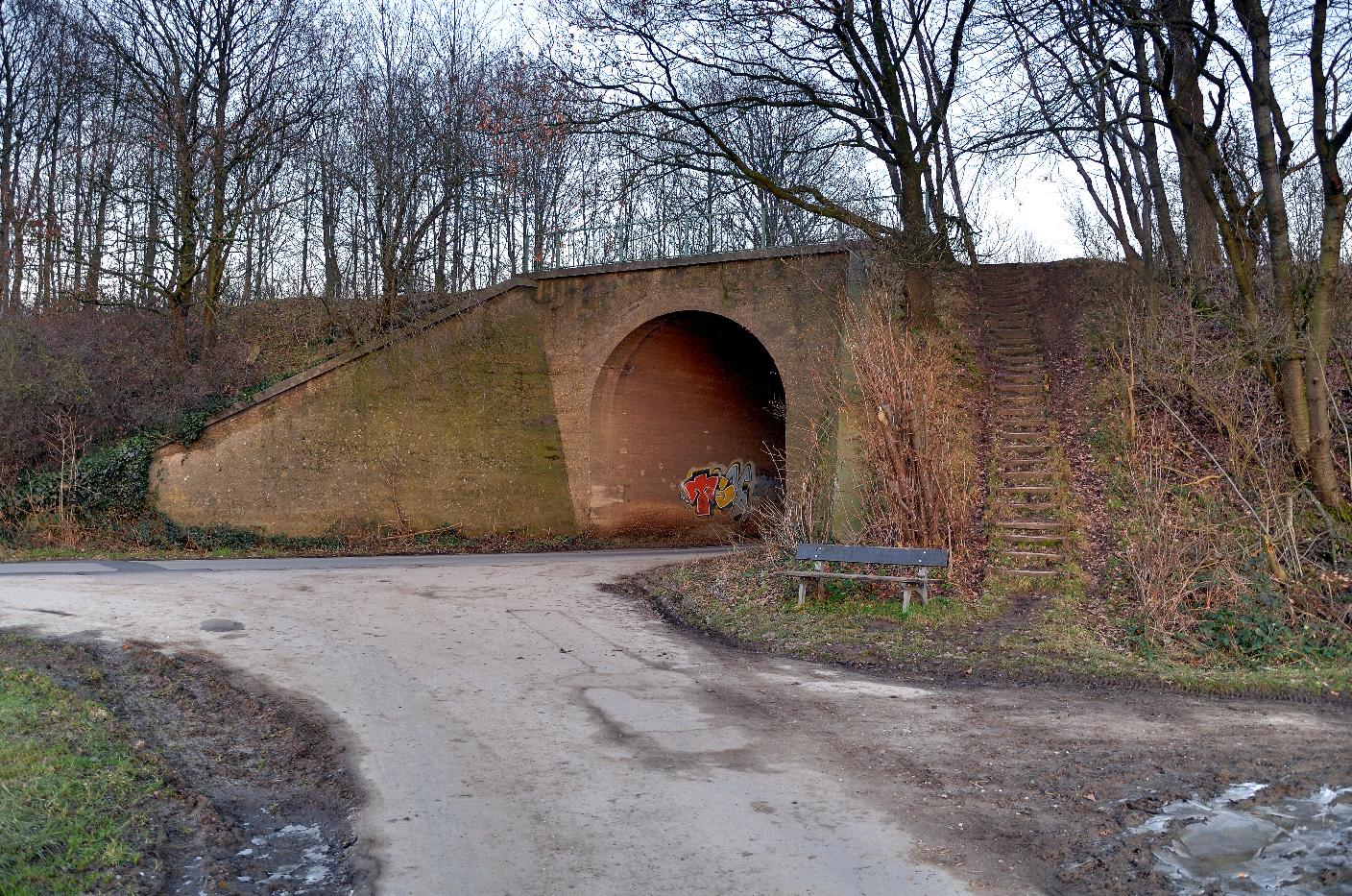
Underpass near Münchrath.

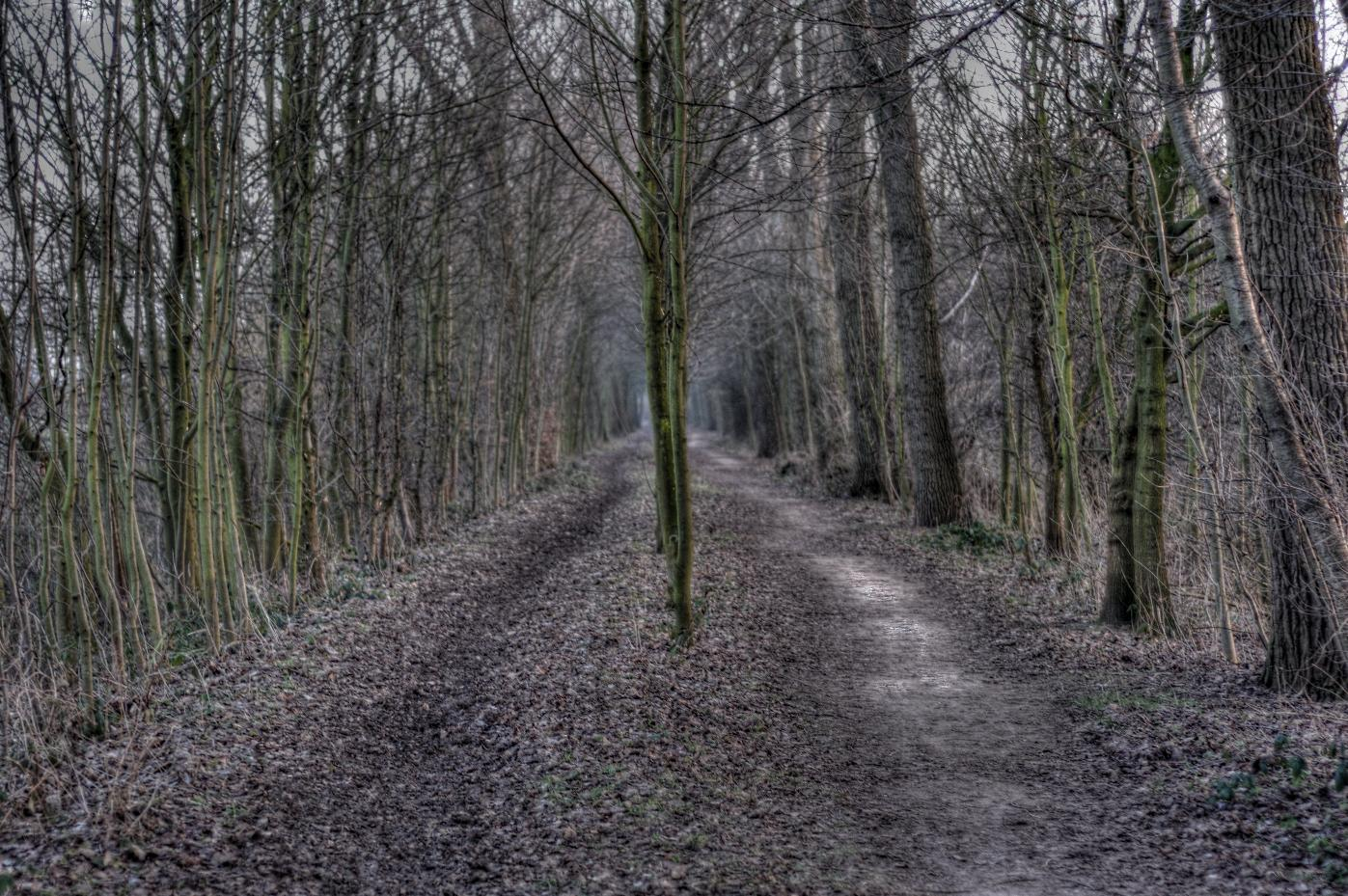
On the embankment near Münchrath, view from the south

=== Rommerskirchen–Horrem section ===
Today two sections of this railway project are still used. The line between Rommerskirchen and Niederaussem is used only by freight trains and is used primarily to connect to the power station in Niederaussem. The only portion that is used by passenger trains is between Bergheim Martinswerk (formerly a junction, still a point where the chainage changes) and Horrem station. This section is now part of the Erft Railway.

The line between Niederaussem and Martinswerk was demolished for the Bergheim open cut lignite mine and the tracks south of Horrem were closed.

=== Liblar–Rech section ===
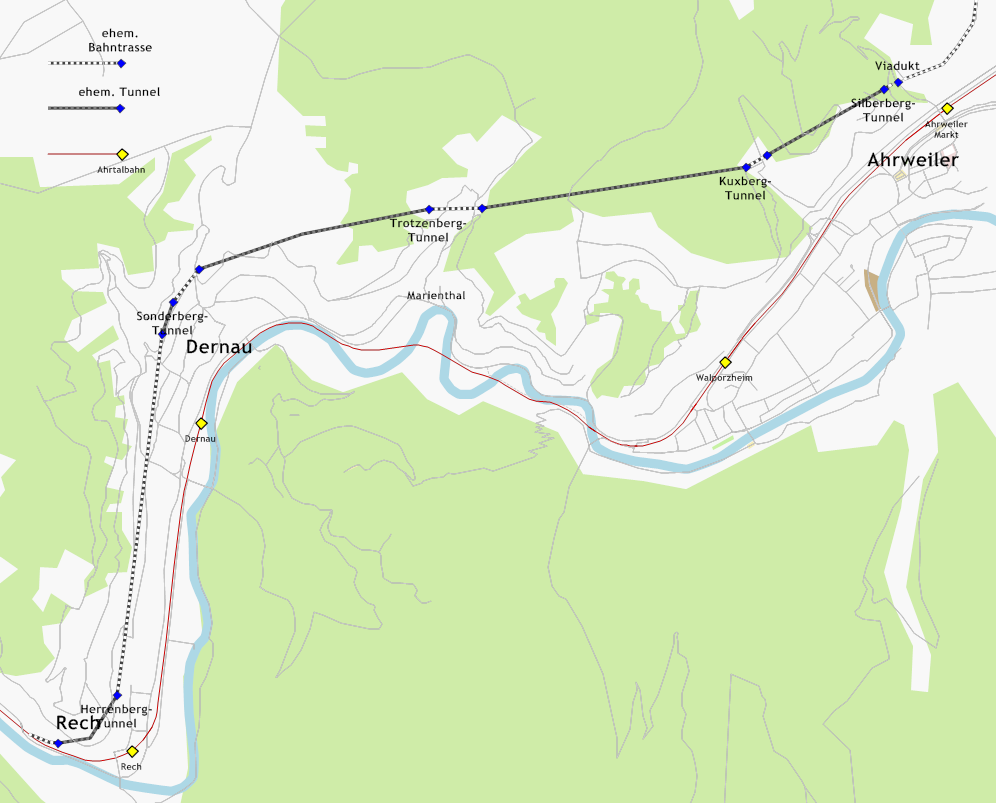
Ahrweiler–Rech line

The route between Liblar and Ringen was used for the construction of the A 61 autobahn. A viaduct and five railway tunnels were required at Ahrweiler for the line to descend the 100 metres down to the Ahr Valley Railway. Some tunnels have been blown up or now serve to store material.

Between 1960 and 1972, during the Cold War, two tunnels on the line were included in the construction at Ahrweiler of a facility intended to serve as an alternate seat of government during an emergency, known as the government bunker (Regierungsbunker). The bunker was abandoned in 1997 and it was largely gutted by 2006. The Government Bunker Documentation Site (Dokumentationsstätte Regierungsbunker) museum is now housed there.

Between Ringen and the Silberberg tunnel, the line would have crossed the Adenbach valley. Only the pillars of the viaduct were built. The eastern portal of the Silberberg tunnel remains. A memorial has been established to commemorate the protection provided to the inhabitants of Ahrweiler during air raids in the Second World War. A path runs along the old railway line from the west entrance of the Silberberg tunnel to the Kuxberg tunnel. The old portals of the Kuxberg tunnels and Trotzenberg tunnel were replaced by backup systems for the government bunker. The former eastern portal of Kuxberg tunnel is now the entrance to the documentation site. In the photograph below it is obscured by trees.

Further south, the line ran to the Sonderberg tunnel. It is now used for storage. A few metres away from the north portal, the line is protected by old towering brick arches, not seen in the photograph. The top image shows the south portal. The embankment has been removed, but vestiges of a former road underpass enclose a small vineyard. The line would have reached the Ahr Valley Railway near Rech. The embankment is still visible, as is the left retaining wall at the former access to the Herrenberg tunnel. The tunnel entrance has been blown up.

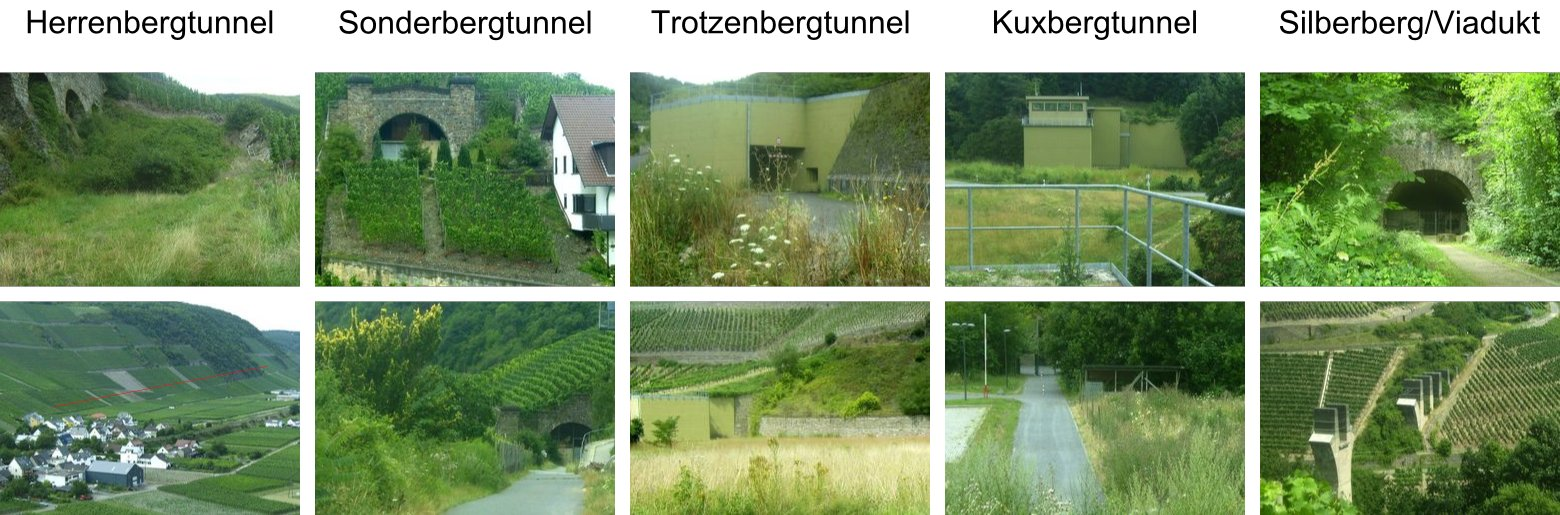

=== Ringen–Bad Bodendorf section ===
Southeast of the proposed Ringen station, the route to Rech and Bad-Bodendorf branches from the Strategic Railway Embankment. The line of the Ringen–Bad Bodendorf section would have initially run via Bengen to Nierendorf, then run around Birresdorf on a long curve and into an s-shaped curve through Grafschaft and past Nierendorf again, running not far from Kirchdaun via Gimmigen to Bad Bodendorf, where there would have been a junction with the Ahr Valley Railway. The total length of the line would have been 15 km.

Intermediate stations were also planned at Nierendorf, Kirchdaun and Gimmigen. The planning of the descent of the line down the Ahr valley was a major challenge, as the line would have fallen about 130 metres in altitude from Grafschaft to Bad Bodendorf.

In 1918, construction began of the section from Ringen to the planned Nierendorf station between Nierendorf and Leimersdorf. The trackbed of the Ringen–Nierendorf section was completed in the autumn of 1926. Construction then stopped. Disputes over the route of the lines, the expected high costs due to the necessary bridges and tunnels, and not least the declining strategic importance of the lines meant that work stopped.

Tracks have never been laid on the Ringen–Bad Bodendorf section of the line. Part of the A 61 autobahn is now built on the route to Nierendorf station, but the line is still visible in many places. The site of the proposed Nierendorf station is now used as a sports field.
