= Ahr Valley =

Valley in Germany

- Ahrtal
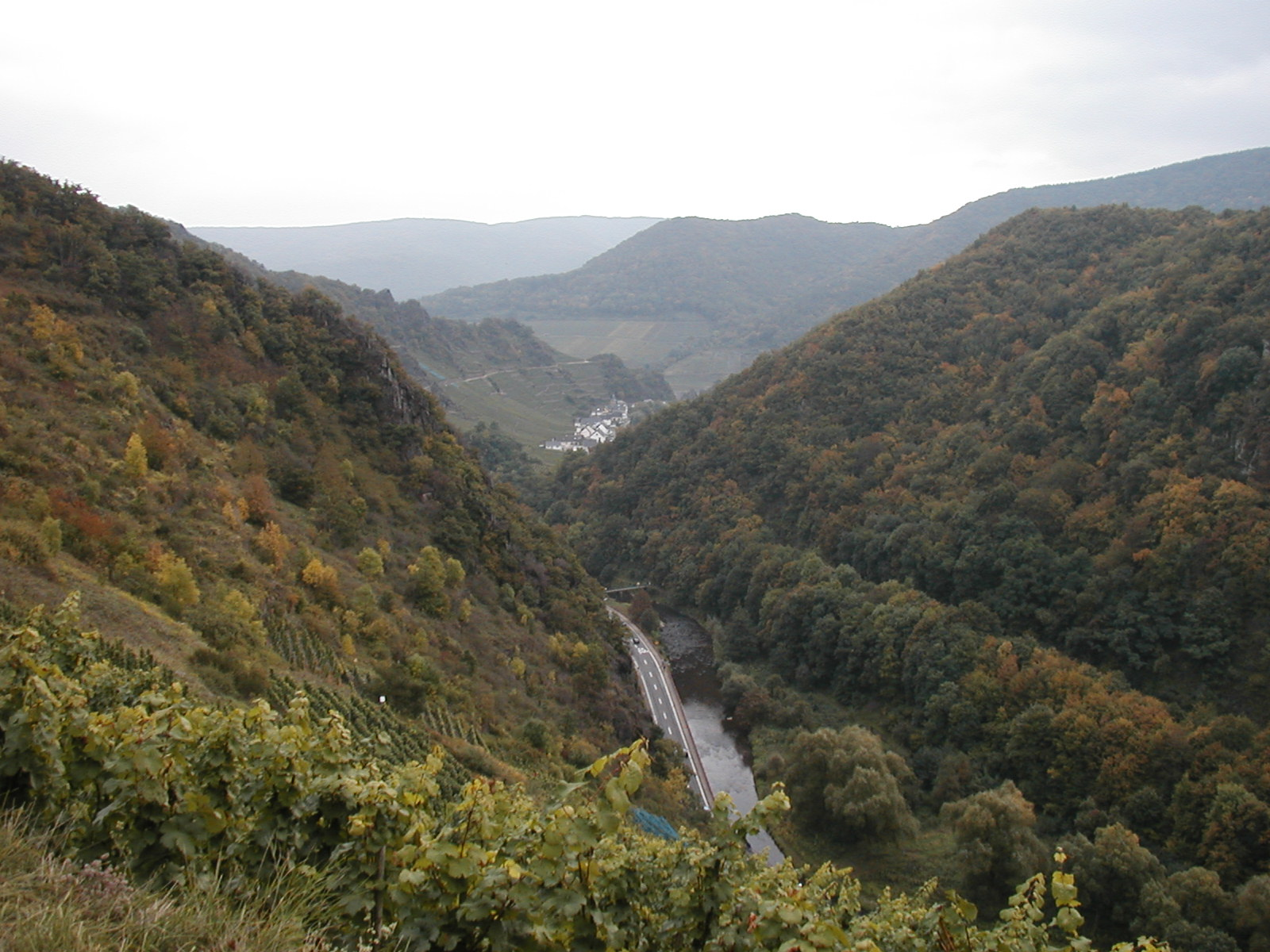
- The Middle Ahr valley

- Location within Rhineland-Palatinate

Geography
- Location: Rhineland-Palatinate
- Coordinates: 50°32′N 7°04′E
- Rivers: Ahr
- Interactive map of Ahr Valley

The Ahr valley (German: Ahrtal, pronounced [ˈaːɐ̯taːl]) is named after the Ahr, a left tributary of the Rhine in Germany. It begins at the Ahr spring (Ahrquelle) in Blankenheim in the county of Euskirchen (North Rhine-Westphalia) and runs generally eastwards. At its southernmost point it enters the county of Ahrweiler, and hence the state of Rhineland-Palatinate. Running through the collective municipality of Adenau the valley bends northeast at its confluence with the Adenauer Bach and reaches the collective municipality of Altenahr, from where it resumes its characteristic west to east course, albeit interrupted by meanders. Here begins the section that is known as the Ahr valley (Ahrtal) in a touristic sense. Here it is characterized by vineyards on the south-facing slopes and a picturesque rocky landscape, carved out by the river creating a 300 meter deep gorge in the Ahr Hills. In the next stage the Ahr reaches the area of the county town of Bad Neuenahr-Ahrweiler, before finally discharging into the Rhine south of Remagen in the borough of Sinzig.

In July 2021, a catastrophic flood killed 135 inhabitants in the Ahr valley and 47 along the Erft river to the north in North Rhine Westphalia. About 8,800 homes were destroyed across the region. The federal and state authorities made 30 bilion euro's available for reconstruction. Insurance, donations and the owners own money further added to the rebuilding effort.

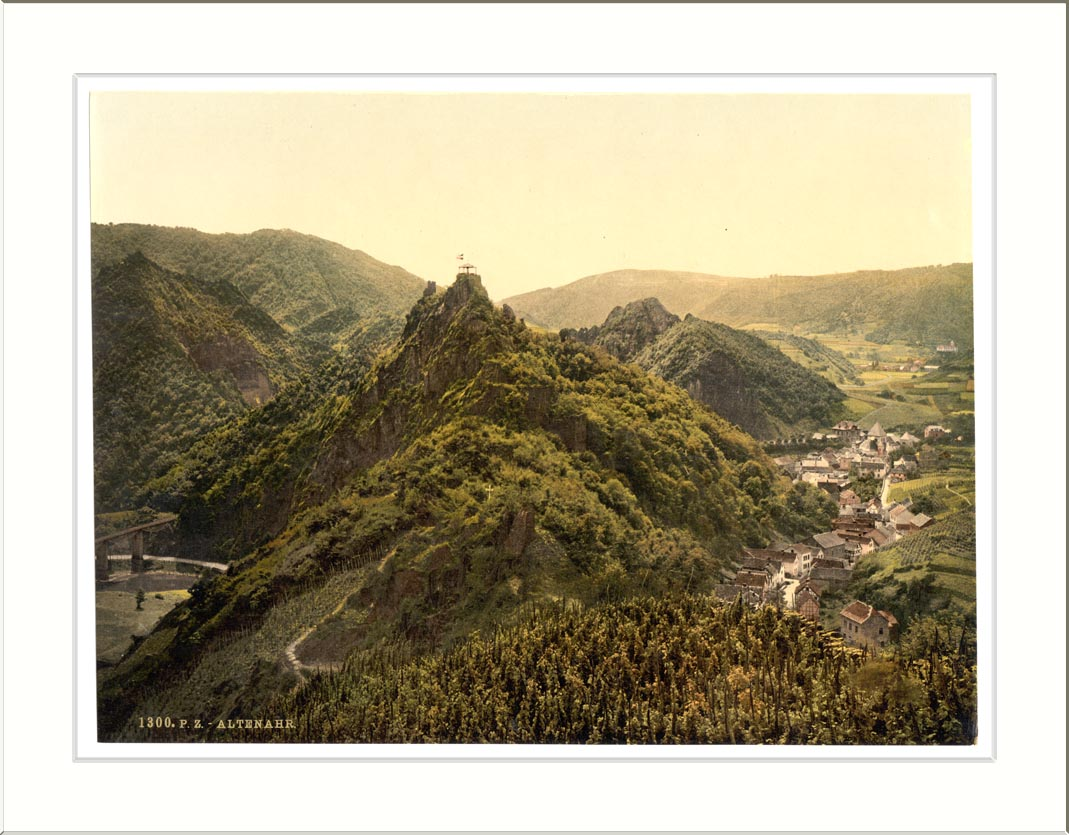
Historic view of the Ahr valley near Altenahr

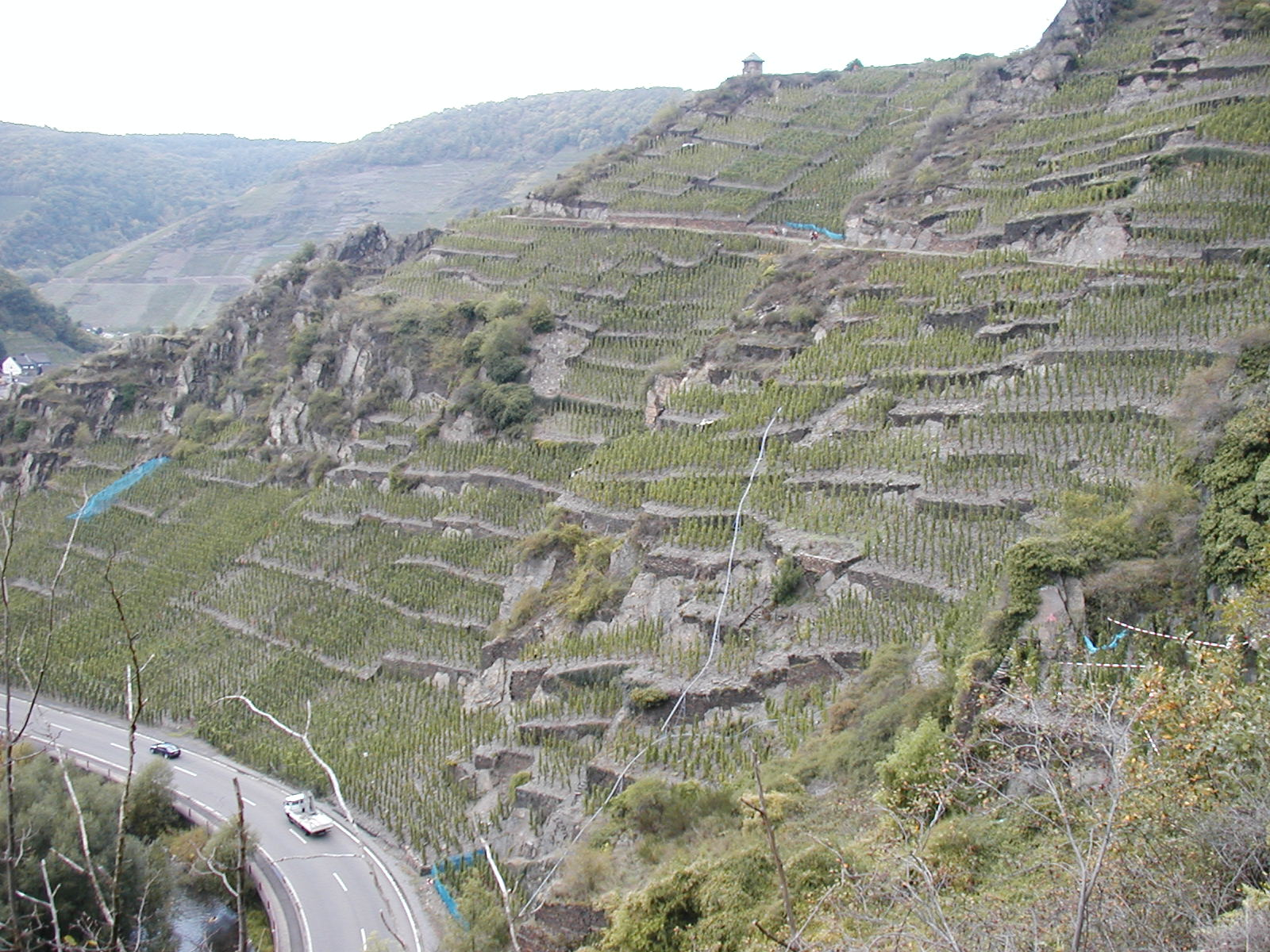
Vineyards in the valley near Mayschoß

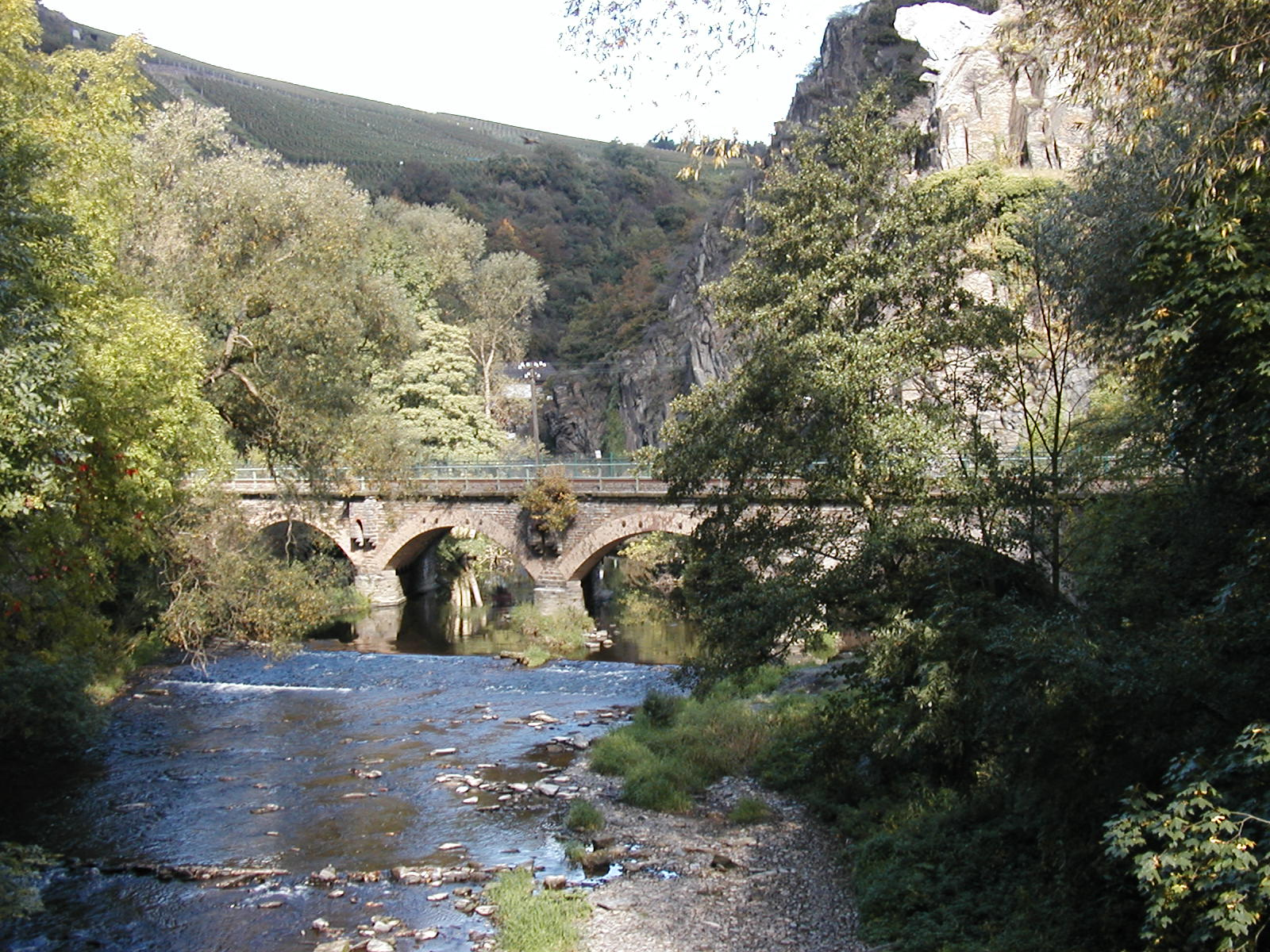
The Ahr below the Bunte Kuh (upper right) above Walporzheim

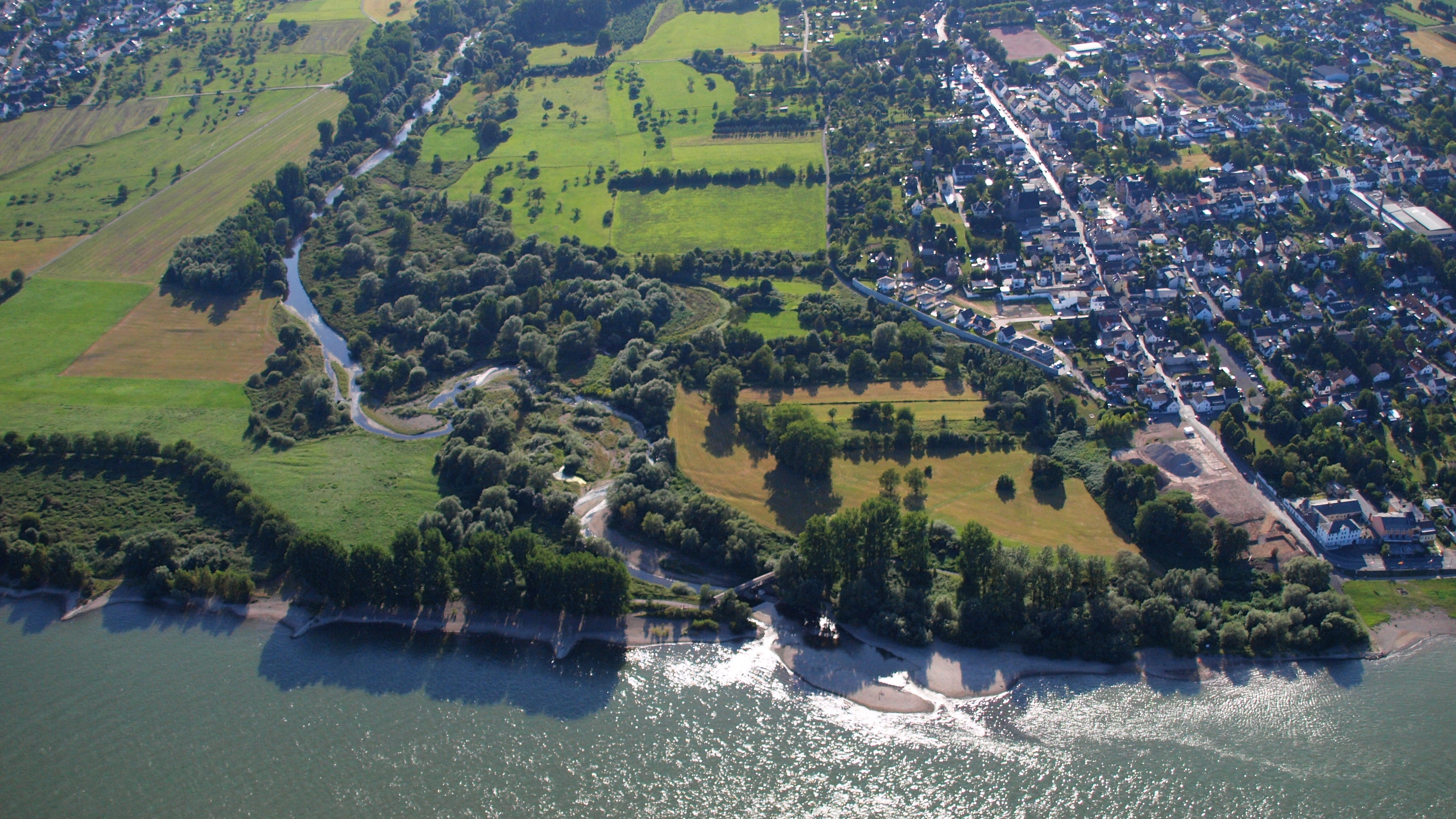
The renaturalised mouth of the Ahr south of Kripp

== Course ==
=== Upper Ahr valley ===
From its head, the Ahr valley runs through a rolling uplands with pastures, woods and occasional hamlets or farmsteads. It is followed by the B 258 federal highway. The first noteworthy villages are Ahrhütte and Ahrdorf, in the municipality of Blankenheim. The Ahr valley then becomes gradually narrower and reaches its southernmost point where it leaves the state of North Rhine-Westphalia. The first village in Rhineland-Palatinate that it encounters is Dorsel, on the heights above the valley. In Müsch the B 258 leaves the Ahr valley, and the L 73 then accompanies the river, which is still small at this stage. From here the valley runs through Antweiler to Fuchshofen, almost northwards, before swinging almost due east from Schuld, passing Insul and reaching Dümpelfeld where it is joined by the B 257. Here, at its confluence with the Adenauer Bach, coming from the south, the Ahr heads northeast, leaves the collective municipality (VG) of Adenau and reaches the collective municipality village of Altenahr south of Liers, which belongs to Hönningen. This is now the middle course of the Ahr, the Mittelahr.

=== Middle Ahr valley ===
The valley runs initially northeastwards from Hönningen via Ahrbrück, Pützfeld, Kreuzberg and Altenburg to Altenahr. From Ahrbrück the B 257 is joined by the Ahr Valley Railway which follows the valley to the Rhine. At Altenahr the valley bends east and initially has an extremely meandering course. Here, the river is accompanied by the B 267, although it does not follow every bend. In Altenahr is the start of the great Ahr loop (Ahrschleife) which is protected due to its flora and fauna. From here the valley is ravine-like, its rugged rock faces cutting into the Ahr Hills. From Reimerzhoven there are extensive vineyards especially on the northern side of the river (i.e. on the south-facing slopes). Near Laach the Ahr runs round another loop in the valley and then passes the wine villages of Mayschoß, Rech, Dernau and Marienthal before finally reaching the territory of the town of Bad Neuenahr-Ahrweiler. The last narrow portion of the Ahr valley lies below the Bunte Kuh ("Coloured Cow"), a rock formation that reaches almost to the river and leaves hardly any room for road and railway. In Walporzheim the valley bottom broadens suddenly into the Lower Ahr Valley (untere Ahrtal).

=== Lower Ahr valley ===
The lower Ahr valley is also dominated by vineyards. The Ahr flows through the settlements of Ahrweiler, Bad Neuenahr, Heppingen and Heimersheim, where the vineyards end. The valley floor between Bad Bodendorf on the northern edge and Sinzig on a terrace to the south, is characterised by arable farming, fruit and vegetable growing. The confluence of the Ahr with the Golden Mile of the Rhine near Kripp has an almost natural character and is a nature reserve.

== Economy ==
The Ahr Valley is primarily known for its wine. The wine festivals that take place in the various wine villages and towns from the beginning of September to the end of October play an important role in regional tourism, especially in Altenahr, Mayschoß, Rech, Dernau, Walporzheim, Ahrweiler and Heimersheim. The region and the Volcanic Eifel to the south are also known for the production of mineral water; for example, the iron-rich springs (e. g. the Apollinaris Spring) have made Bad Neuenahr into a spa town.

Tourism has grown the economy for many years. The areas around the springs in Blankenheim, the Middle Ahr Valley between Altenahr and Bad Neuenahr-Ahrweiler benefit from tourism. The county town has become one of the most popular tourist stays in the state of Rhineland-Palatinate. Among the villages along the Ahr, Dernau is representative - it has transformed from local wine village to a tourist destination.

== Culture and sights ==
Among the sights in the Ahr Valley are the Roman villa of Bad Neuenahr-Ahrweiler, an excavation of a Roman settlement in Ahrweiler, next to the Red Wine Trail (Rotweinwanderweg).

Near Bad Neuenahr the Ahr Valley is crossed by the prominent Ahr Viaduct that carries the A 61 motorway. The 1.5-kilometre-long, prestressed concrete bridge, completed in 1975, with its 50-metre-high concrete pillars, dominates this part of the valley.

During the Cold War the Ahr Valley was envisaged as a safe location for the central organs of the federal government. Below the vineyards near Marienthal, a concealed government bunker was built in 1962 in a wider section of the valley between Dernau and Bad Neuenahr-Ahrweiler. It has been largely dismantled and, in March 2008, was opened to the public as a documentation site for the Cold War.

For hikers the Ahr Valley has the following attractions:

- the Ahr Path (AhrSteig) with its two blue and red sections and a total of six stages, which has been nominated as a "Quality Path of Hiking Germany" (Qualitätsweg Wanderbares Deutschland) by the German Rambling Association (Deutscher Wanderverband).
- the Red Wine Trail (Rotweinwanderweg), that winds its way from Altenahr to Bad Neuenahr through the vineyards and continues to Bad Bodendorf.
- the Ahr Riverbank Way (Ahr-Uferweg)
- the Iron Trail (Eisenweg).
- the Wine Discovery Trail (Weinbaulehrpfad).

For cyclists:

- the Ahr Cycleway (Ahr-Radweg), which runs mainly along the Ahr from its mouth in Sinzig and has only a gentle gradient.

== Transport and infrastructure ==
The Ahr Valley Railway runs from Remagen initially double-tracked, before reducing to a single track from Walporzheim, to Ahrbrück. The line is closed beyond that point.

== Literature ==
- Vera Kettenbach: Das Ahrtal von Bad Bodendorf bis Altenahr. Gaasterland-Verlag, 3. Aufl., Düsseldorf, 2010, ISBN 978-3-935873-02-4
- Heinz Schönewald: Bad Neuenahr. Gaasterland-Verlag, Düsseldorf, 2006, ISBN 3-935873-13-1
- Hans-Georg Klein: Ahrweiler. Gaasterland-Verlag, Düsseldorf, 2005, ISBN 3-935873-05-0
- AhrtalReise. Gaasterland-Verlag, Düsseldorf, 2007, ISBN 978-3-935873-18-5
- Christoph Bach: Der Regierungsbunker im Ahrtal und seine Geschichte. Gaasterland-Verlag, Düsseldorf 2008, ISBN 978-3-935873-30-7.
- Das Ahrthal, malerische Ansichten / nach Originalzeichnungen in Stahl gest. von den vorzüglichsten Künstlern. Bonn : Habicht, [ca. 1840], Online-Ausgabe dilibri Rheinland-Pfalz
- Neuestes Album vom schönen Ahrthal. Bonn : Foppen, [ca. 1870], Online-Ausgabe dilibri Rheinland-Pfalz
- Heinz Schönewald: Bad Neuenahr - Das Weltbad der Kaiserzeit. Sutton Verlag, Erfurt 2009, ISBN 978-3-86680-465-4
