= Government bunker (Germany) =

Massive underground complex built during the cold war

Coordinates: 50°32′28″N 7°03′47″E

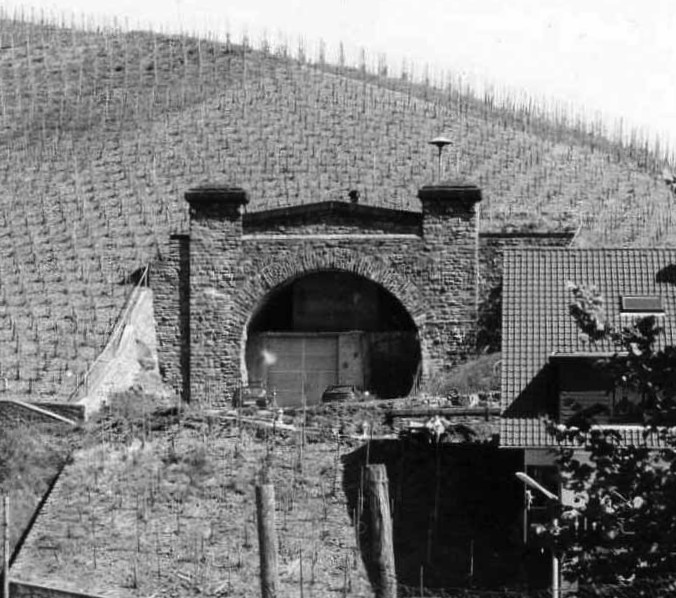
One of the never used railway tunnels in the Ahr Valley

The Government Bunker (Regierungsbunker) in Germany, officially named Ausweichsitz der Verfassungsorgane des Bundes im Krisen- und Verteidigungsfall zur Wahrung von deren Funktionstüchtigkeit (AdVB), in English: "Emergency Seat of the Federal Constitutional Organs for the State of Crisis or State of Defence to Maintain their Ability to Function" was a massive underground complex built during the Cold War era to house the German government, parliament and enough federal personnel needed to keep the government working in the event of war or severe crisis. Located only about 25 kilometres (16 mi) south of Bonn, Germany (the government seat of pre-unification West Germany), in the Ahr Valley between the towns of Ahrweiler and Dernau, it was one of the best kept secrets of West Germany. It was built between 1960 and 1972 inside two abandoned railway tunnels that were built as part of the Strategic Railway, maintained and kept in a working condition for about 30 years and decommissioned in 1997. A small part of the once-secret site is now open to the public as Government Bunker Documentation Site, while the vast majority is abandoned and sealed.

== History ==
The bunker complex below the vineyards and forests along the river Ahr was built inside two disused railway tunnels of a former strategic railway line built in preparation of World War I but never entered into service. After the war, during years of recession, the German state railway company lost interest in the line which was of no economic value and finally abandoned it.

Between 1930 and 1939 the disused railway tunnels were used to farm mushrooms to gain independence from having to import French fungi. During the later phase of World War II several arms manufacturing companies occupied the tunnels and a huge concentration camp for forced labourers was erected outside the protective cover of the tunnels, which was also referred to under the code name Lager Rebstock (Camp Vine). Inside the tunnels was a construction facility for manufacturing ground equipment and mobile launch pads for the V-2 rocket. With increasing Allied air raids at the end of the war, the tunnels served as makeshift air-raid shelters.

== Construction and interior design ==
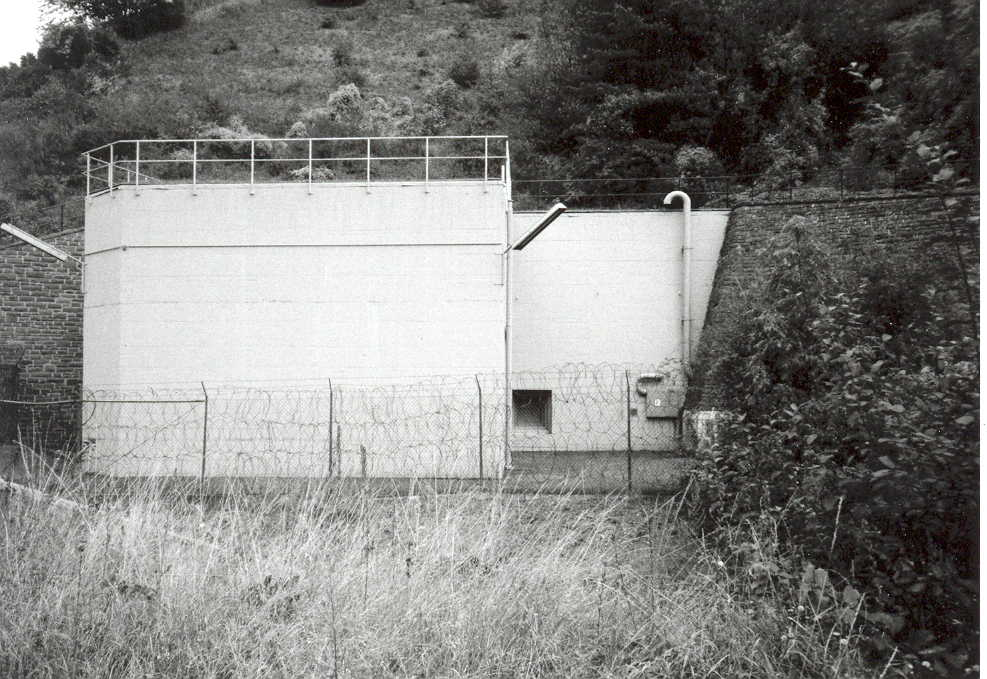
Entrance to section West-East of the government bunker

In the days of cold war, when Germany was on the front line between NATO and the Warsaw Pact, it became apparent that a nuclear war fought on German soil was a very real possibility. Therefore, it was decided that some form of emergency seat was needed for the federal government, should Bonn become the target of an attack. After some deliberations the two tunnels were selected as the site for such an installation due to their proximity to Bonn and the rural surroundings which, unlike urban areas, would not attract air raids or missile attacks.

Construction of the bunker began in 1960 and lasted until 1972. The government bunker, also known by the neutral-sounding name Dienststelle Marienthal (Office Marienthal) was constructed inside the existing tunnels which had never been used for the purpose they had initially been built for. Additional tunnels of a total length of 17.3 km were driven and blasted into the soft slate mountains along the Ahr Valley to build an emergency seat for the federal government that would allow up 3,000 people to survive an attack for at least 30 days. At the time of construction the total length of all tunnels probably amounted to 19 km.

The facility was designed to withstand attacks with nuclear weapons and was fitted with autonomous supplies of electric power, fresh air and drinking water. Unlike other fortifications or military bunkers, however, there were no defence systems and it would have been protected by military units stationed nearby. The costs of construction were estimated at DM 3 billion, although no precise figures are known due to the high level of secrecy.

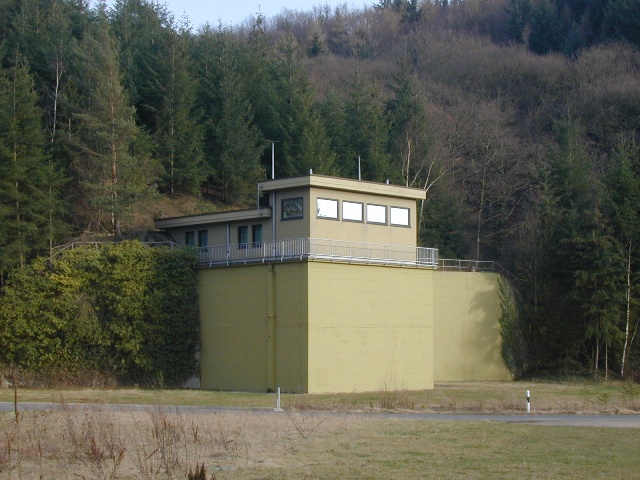
Access building to section 2 (East/West) of the government bunker near Marienthal after deconstruction, March 2008

The bunker built beneath 110m of slate rock consisted of two sections named Ost (East) and West which were separated by a valley and connected by a 60m deep passageway. The eastern section was partitioned again into two independent parts (Ost/West and Ost/Ost) and the western section into three parts (West/West, West/Mitte [Centre] and West/Ost), each with tunnels parallel to and crossing the main tunnels. All tunnels were concrete-lined and most had two floors, with several exits and emergency escape routes. The main portals were sealed by manoeuvrable steel and concrete gates built by MAN, each weighing 25 tonnes. The bunker housed 897 offices and 936 dormitories and had 25,000 doors in total. It even had an underground hairdresser's salon.

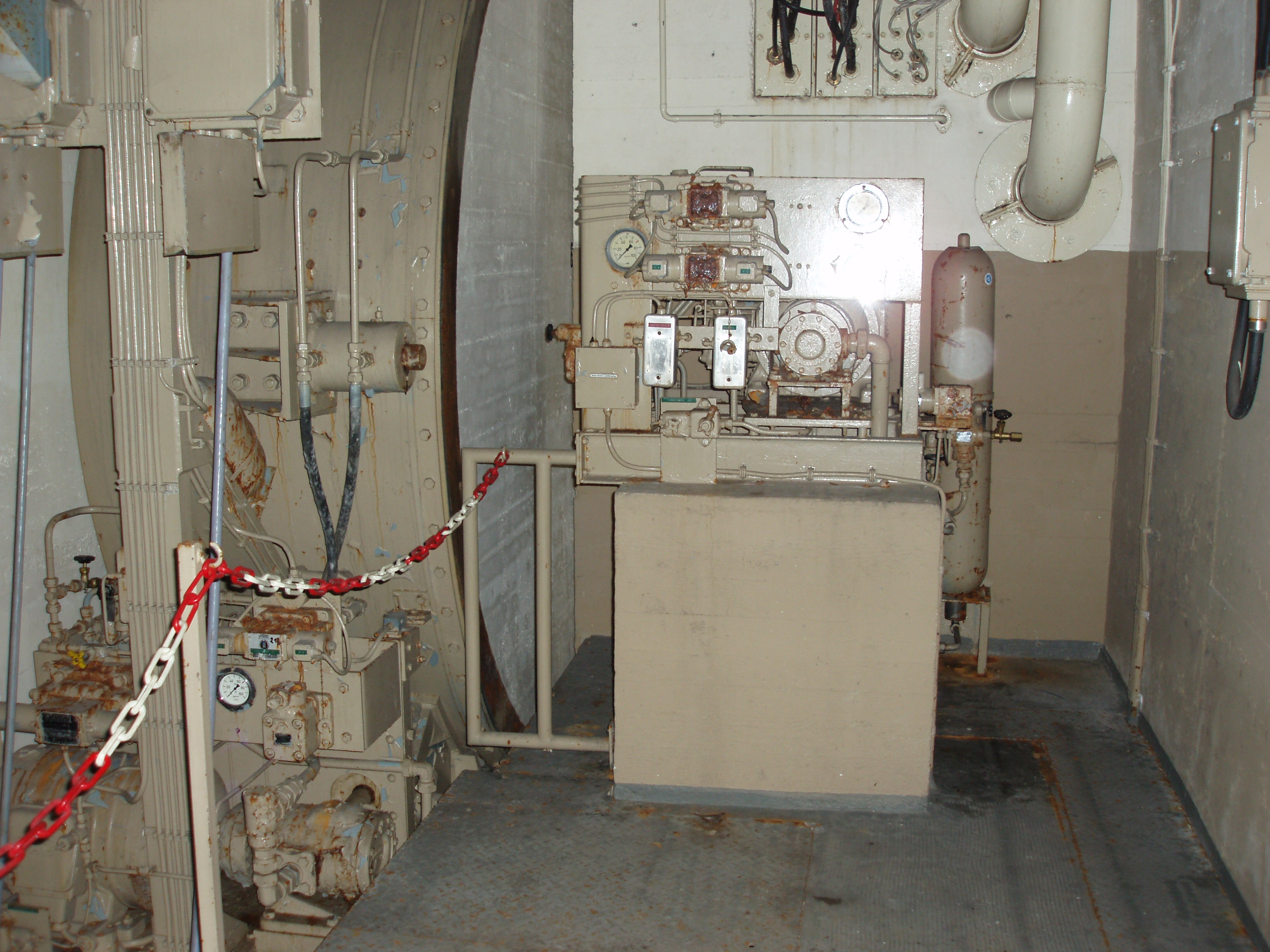
The round gate (left) was powered by hydraulics and could seal the entrance within seconds.

Huge gates and ventilation lids were installed that could seal off the bunker hermetically within seconds. Drinking water was drawn from two deep wells. Air filters, supplies, kitchens, medical units, dentist's surgeries, etc. would have allowed for survival without contact with the outside world for up to 30 days. In the event of a nuclear attack it would have been possible to continue governing and lead the West German Armed Forces from inside the bunker. In its final capacity the bunker would have accommodated up to 3,000 people of which all but the federal president and chancellor would have slept in multi-bed dormitories fitted with only very basic furniture.

In the event of a defence situation the bunker would have accommodated the federal president, the chancellor, the joint defense committee, the president of the constitutional court, various ministries as well as civilian and military personnel. Briefings would have been held in large conference and map rooms situated next to the chancellor's office. Part of the A61 motorway (Autobahn) near the village of Gelsdorf had been designed for use as a runway and would have been used as an airport for the bunker with spacious aircraft parking spaces at both ends disguised as roadside car parks.

Every two years exercises took place in the bunker as part of NATO Wintex whereby staff actually worked inside the hermetically sealed bunker for up to 30 days. Such exercises, for instance, involved the passing of bills by an emergency parliament of 22 members, including a mock chancellor and president. The bunker was used for the first time in October 1966 during the course of the NATO high command exercise Fallex 66, and for the last time in 1987. The Berlin Wall came down two years later.

About 180 staff working in three shifts were required for maintaining, repairing and operating the bunker. In 2008 it became publicly known that the shelter would have just about withstood the detonation of a 20 kiloton bomb, comparable to the destructive force of the Hiroshima bomb. Secret surveys conducted as early as 1962 had found that 250-times more powerful weapons were to be expected and it had been made clear that the bunker would collapse if ever hit by a nuclear bomb. Despite this known fact, however, construction was continued for political reasons.

== Dismantling of the bunker ==
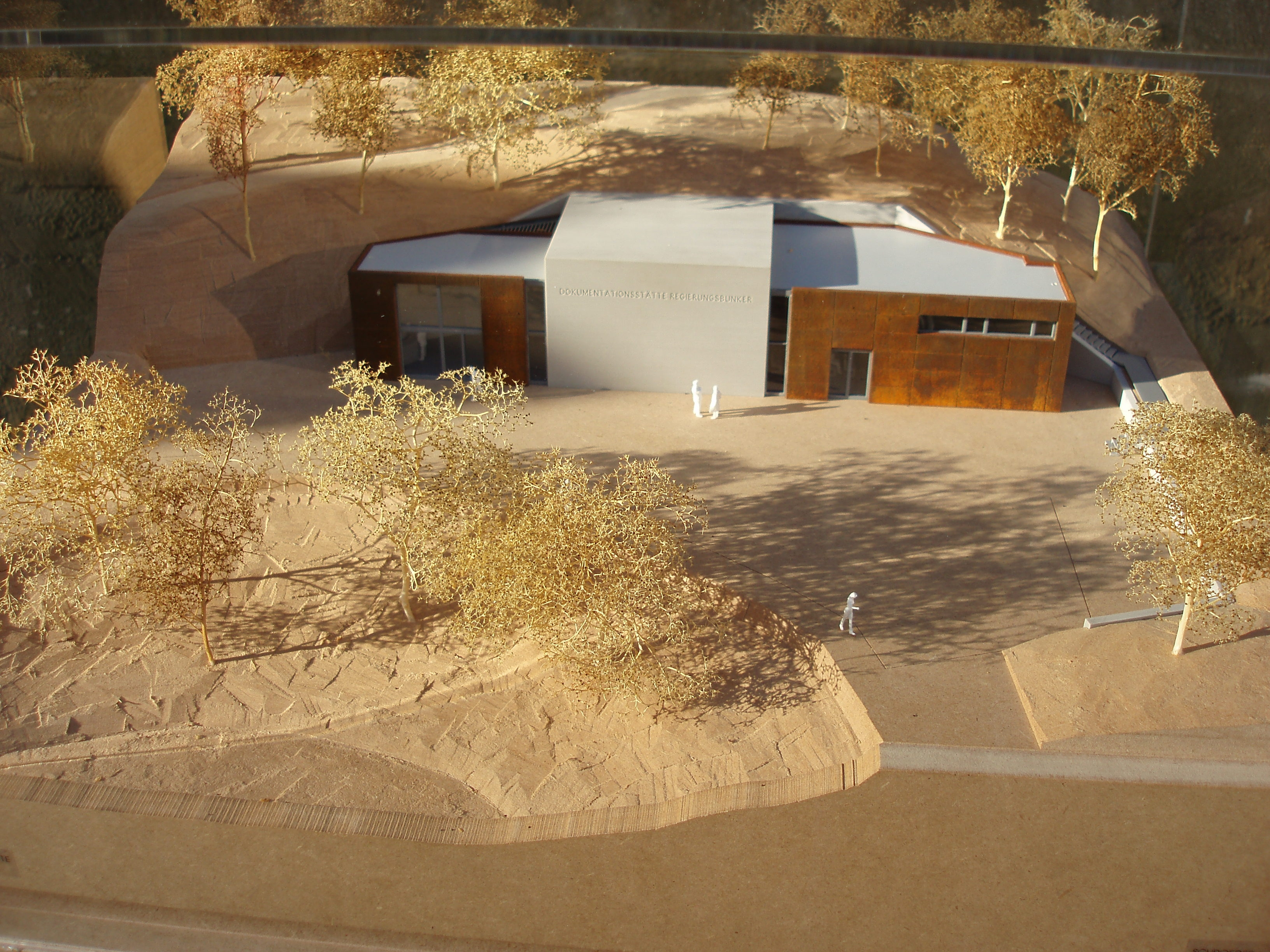
Outside view of the documentation site (model)

In 1997, following the decision to move the capital and government seat of re-unified Germany to Berlin, it was decided to abandon the bunker as no concept for civilian use could be found. Only few parts of the fire safety installations had been upgraded, which was a decisive criterion that deterred potential investors. The costs of continuous operation of DM 20 million (about EUR 10 million), however, could have been reduced in event of civil use as preparations for potential nuclear attacks would no longer have been required. It also would have been possible to use only one of the five independent sections. Over the following years the tunnels were cleared out, gutted and sealed, costing €16 million in total. In 2001 deconstruction was interrupted briefly due to considerations whether it might be sensible to have a bunker following the September 11 attacks. All that remains now are the gutted, concrete-lined tunnels. The access buildings above the Kloster Marienthal vineyard still exist, although the doors have been welded shut.

== The Documentation Site ==
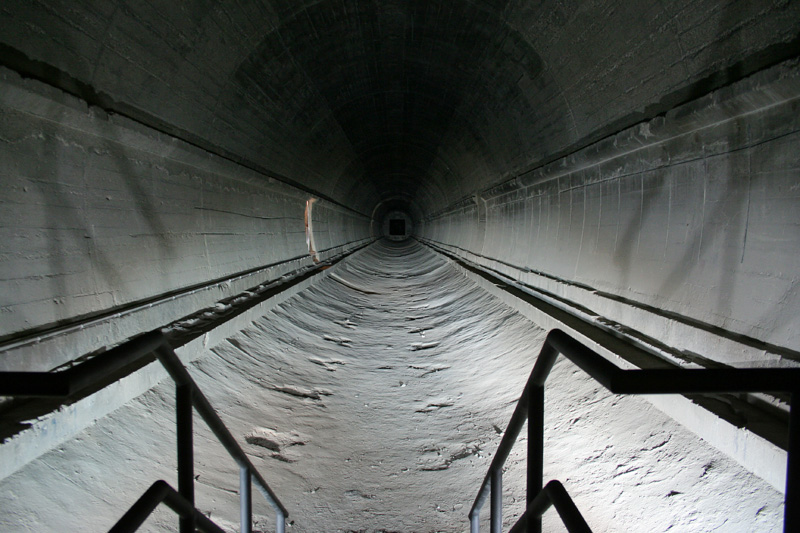
The gutted tunnel can be seen at the documentation site today.

Only 203 metres (666 ft) of the original bunker exist today near the town of Ahrweiler and have been converted into a museum of the Cold War. It was opened on 29 February 2008. The German government still owns this remaining part of the bunker and has invested €2.5million for its conversion into a museum. The investment was approved because the estimated costs of €30million for deconstruction were undercut considerably, costing only €16million in total.

The Dokumentationsstätte Regierungsbunker museum (Government Bunker Documentation Site) features a cinema, the entrance to former section 1 (Ost/Ost) and 203 metres (666 ft) of tunnel more or less in its original condition. Visitors can see the two MAN gates as well as the air locks used to bypass them with the corresponding decontamination rooms, followed by several steel doors and several offices and dormitories. A partially authentically furnished medical unit is also on display. Original equipment from the bunker and guided tours help imagine what life in the bunker once was like. The museum ends with a view into the fully gutted tunnel.

== Literature ==
- Bundesamt für Bauwesen und Raumordnung/Stiftung Haus der Geschichte der Bundesrepublik Deutschland: Der Regierungsbunker. Ernst Wasmuth Verlag, Berlin/Tübingen 2007, ISBN 978-3-8030-0671-4.
