= Ahr Cycleway =

Cycle route in Germany

Coordinates: 50.4363°N 6.6509°E

Infobox Radfernweg (Ahr Cycleway (Ahr-Radweg))
- Length: 77 km (48 mi)
- Location: Ahr Valley (North Rhine-Westphalia, Rhineland-Palatinate); 12696 Ahr Cycleway on OpenStreetMap
- Trailheads: Ahr source in Blankenheim, Rhine confluence at Remagen-Kripp
- Use: 5 km along a Landstraße, otherwise dedicated cycleway
- Elevation gain/loss: Start 471 m, End 56 m 502 Höhenmeter down 84 Höhenmeter up
- Difficulty: River cycleway, low gradient
- Waymark: File:Logo Ahr-Radweg.svg
- Surface: asphalt or otherwise metalled paths
- Website: Entry on website of Ahr Valley Tourism

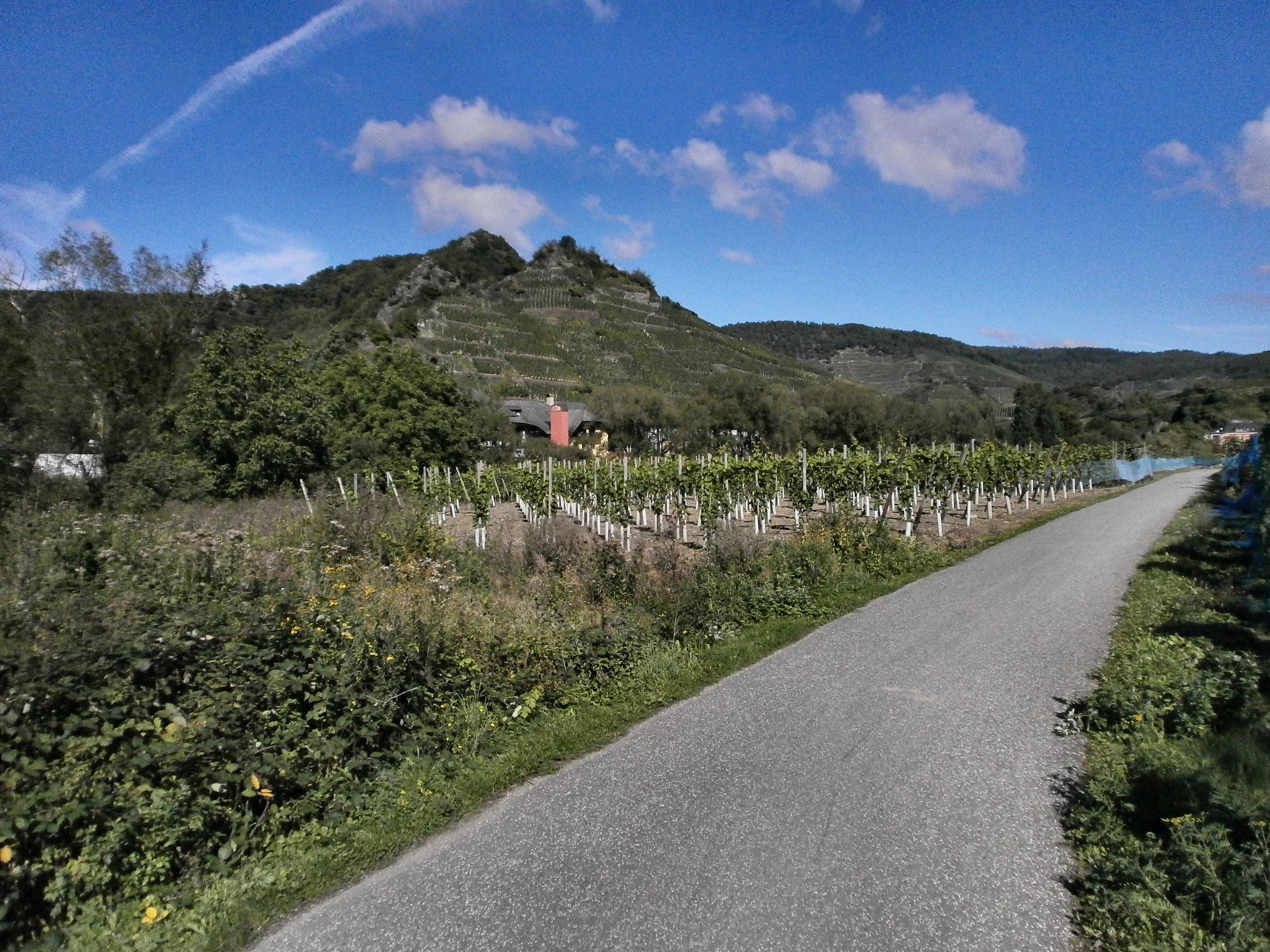

The Ahr Cycleway (German: Ahr-Radweg) is a cycle path, that runs from the source of the River Ahr in Blankenheim, in the Eifel region of Germany, along the river to its mouth on the Rhine near Kripp. Several sections are on an old railway trackbed. The route starts in the middle of the Eifel mountains and runs initially through a valley landscape with broad river bends. From the hamlet of Schuld the Ahr Valley narrows and swings around the settlement in a loop. In Altenahr, hillsides and rocks come close to the river itself and offer the best conditions for the wine growing. Behind the spa town of Bad Neuenahr-Ahrweiler the Ahr reaches its broad delta on the Rhine. The cycleway is not difficult and suitable for leisure cyclists. The route is uniformly signed with the cycleway's logo.

== Literature ==
- Dirk Holterman, Harald Herzog: Der Ahr-Radweg. Radeln zwischen Rhein und Eifel. Bouvier, 2003, ISBN 3-416-02999-2
- Radwanderkarte Ahrtal-Radweg, 1 : 50 000, Publicpress-Verlag, ISBN 978-3-89920-324-0
- ADFC-Regionalkarte Eifel / Mosel, 1:75.000. Bielefelder Verlag, 1st edition, 2006. ISBN 3-87073-391-8
- Radatlas Radatlas "Südeifel" - zwischen Ardennen und Vulkaneifel, 1:75.000. Verlag Esterbauer. ISBN 978-3-85000-269-1
