= Hönningen =

- Municipality
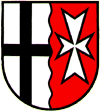
- Coat of arms

- Location of Hönningen within Ahrweiler district
- Interactive map of Hönningen
- Location within Germany Location within Rhineland-Palatinate
- Coordinates: 50°28′28″N 06°57′24″E
- Country: Germany
- State: Rhineland-Palatinate
- District: Ahrweiler
- Municipal assoc.: Altenahr
- Subdivisions: 2

Government
  - Mayor (2019–24): Jürgen Schwarzmann (CDU)

Area
  - Total: 10.02 km^{2} (3.87 sq mi)
- Elevation: 200 m (660 ft)

Population (2025-12-31)
  - Total: 1,044
  - Density: 104.2/km^{2} (269.9/sq mi)
- Time zone: UTC+01:00 (CET)
  - Summer (DST): UTC+02:00 (CEST)
- Postal codes: 53506
- Dialling codes: 02643, 02695
- Vehicle registration: AW
- Website: www.gemeinde-hoenningen.de

Hönningen is a municipality in the district of Ahrweiler, in Rhineland-Palatinate, Germany.

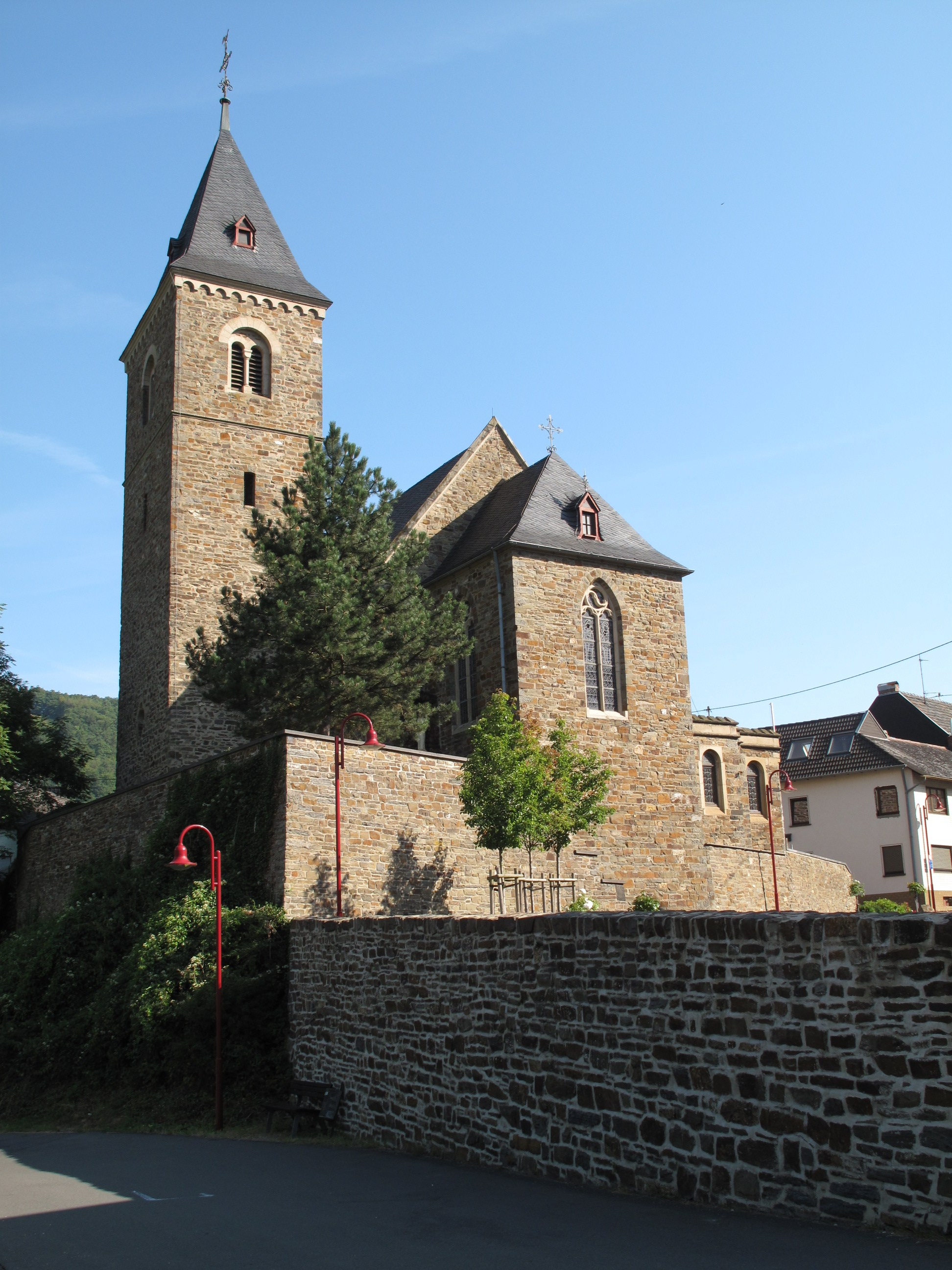
Hönningen, church
