= Mayschoß =

- Municipality
- Coat of arms

- Location of Mayschoß within Ahrweiler district
- Interactive map of Mayschoß
- Location within Germany Location within Rhineland-Palatinate
- Coordinates: 50°31′25″N 07°01′11″E
- Country: Germany
- State: Rhineland-Palatinate
- District: Ahrweiler
- Municipal assoc.: Altenahr
- Subdivisions: 2

Government
  - Mayor (2025): Olaf Hansgeorg Leidreiter

Area
  - Total: 5.66 km^{2} (2.19 sq mi)
- Elevation: 124 m (407 ft)

Population (2025-12-31)
  - Total: 768
  - Density: 136/km^{2} (351/sq mi)
- Time zone: UTC+01:00 (CET)
  - Summer (DST): UTC+02:00 (CEST)
- Postal codes: 53508
- Dialling codes: 02643
- Vehicle registration: AW
- Website: mayschoss.de

Mayschoß is a municipality in the district of Ahrweiler, in Rhineland-Palatinate, Germany.
