= Rech, Rhineland-Palatinate =

Rech
- Municipality
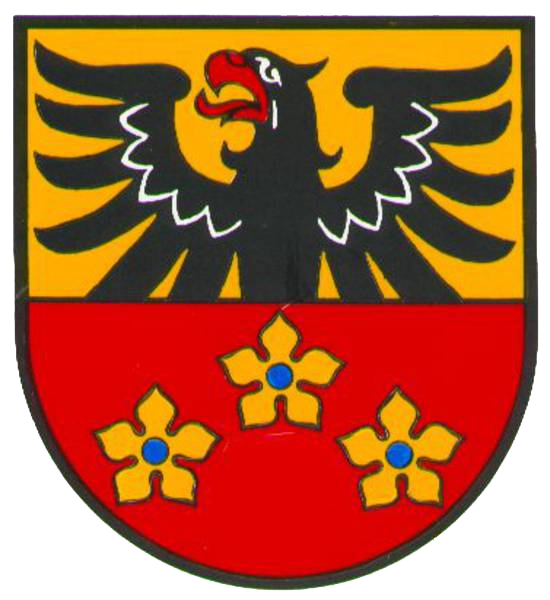
- Coat of arms

- Location of Rech within Ahrweiler district
- Interactive map of Rech
- Location within Germany Location within Rhineland-Palatinate
- Coordinates: 50°30′48″N 7°2′11″E
- Country: Germany
- State: Rhineland-Palatinate
- District: Ahrweiler
- Municipal assoc.: Altenahr

Government
  - Mayor (2019–24): Dominik Gieler

Area
  - Total: 4.72 km^{2} (1.82 sq mi)
- Elevation: 284 m (932 ft)

Population (2025-12-31)
  - Total: 529
  - Density: 112/km^{2} (290/sq mi)
- Time zone: UTC+01:00 (CET)
  - Summer (DST): UTC+02:00 (CEST)
- Postal codes: 53506
- Dialling codes: 02643
- Vehicle registration: AW
- Website: www.rech-weindorf.de

Rech (German pronunciation: [ʁɛç]) is a municipality in the district of Ahrweiler, in Rhineland-Palatinate, Germany. It is situated in the Ahr valley.
