= Dernau =

- Municipality
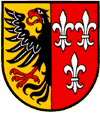
- Coat of arms

- Location of Dernau within Ahrweiler district
- Interactive map of Dernau
- Location within Germany Location within Rhineland-Palatinate
- Coordinates: 50°32′03″N 07°02′33″E
- Country: Germany
- State: Rhineland-Palatinate
- District: Ahrweiler
- Municipal assoc.: Altenahr
- Subdivisions: 5

Government
  - Mayor (2019–24): Alfred Sebastian

Area
  - Total: 5.72 km^{2} (2.21 sq mi)
- Elevation: 124 m (407 ft)

Population (2025-12-31)
  - Total: 1,532
  - Density: 268/km^{2} (694/sq mi)
- Time zone: UTC+01:00 (CET)
  - Summer (DST): UTC+02:00 (CEST)
- Postal codes: 53507
- Dialling codes: 02643; 02641 (Ortsteil Marienthal)
- Vehicle registration: AW
- Website: www.dernau.de

Dernau is a municipality in the district of Ahrweiler, in Rhineland-Palatinate, Germany.

The village of Dernau which is centrally located in the Ahr valley is famous for its wines. Most of them are red wines. Besides agriculture, tourism is a strong economic factor.

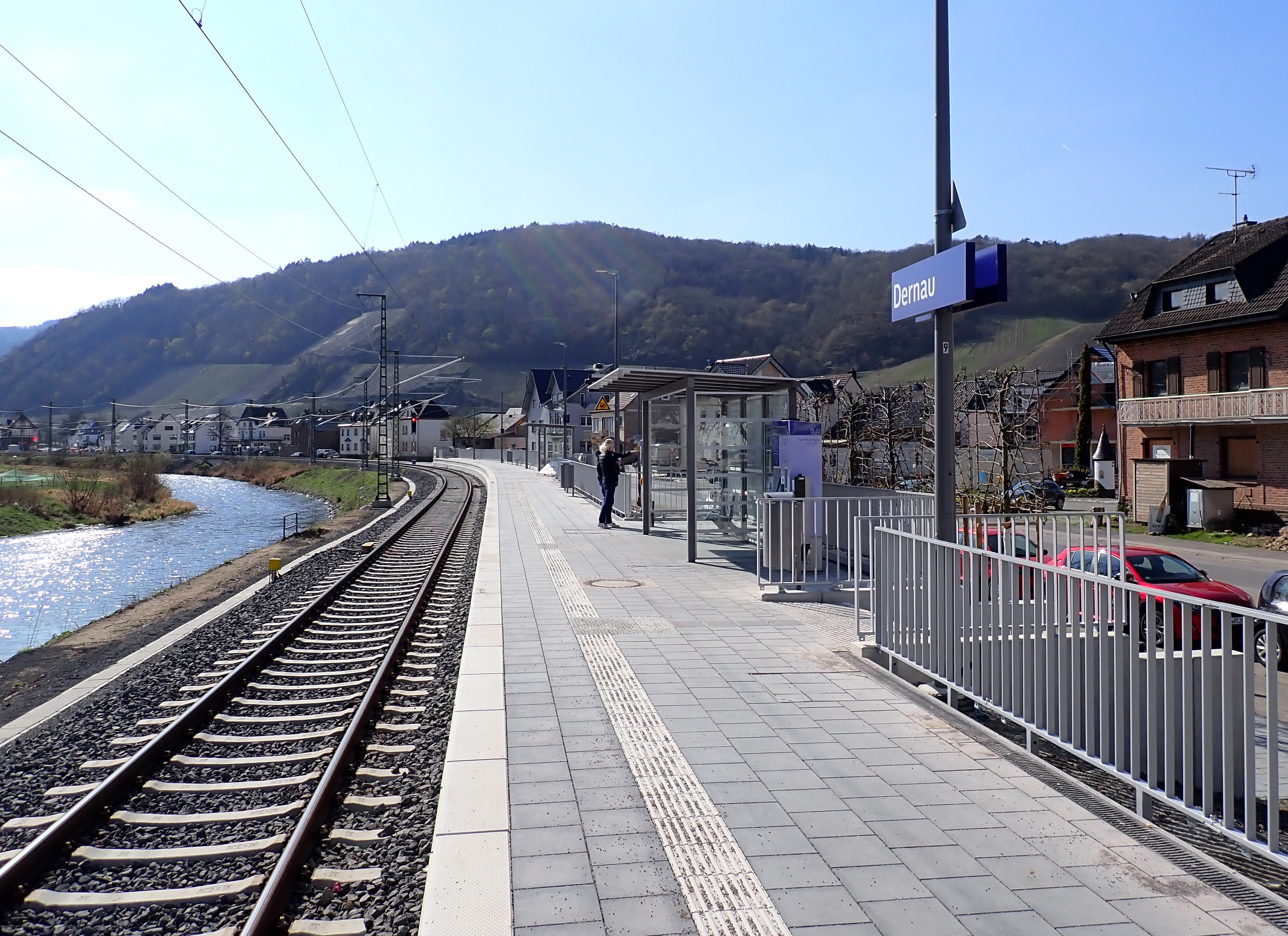
Bahnhof Dernau
