= Art of the Upper Paleolithic =

Oldest form of prehistoric art

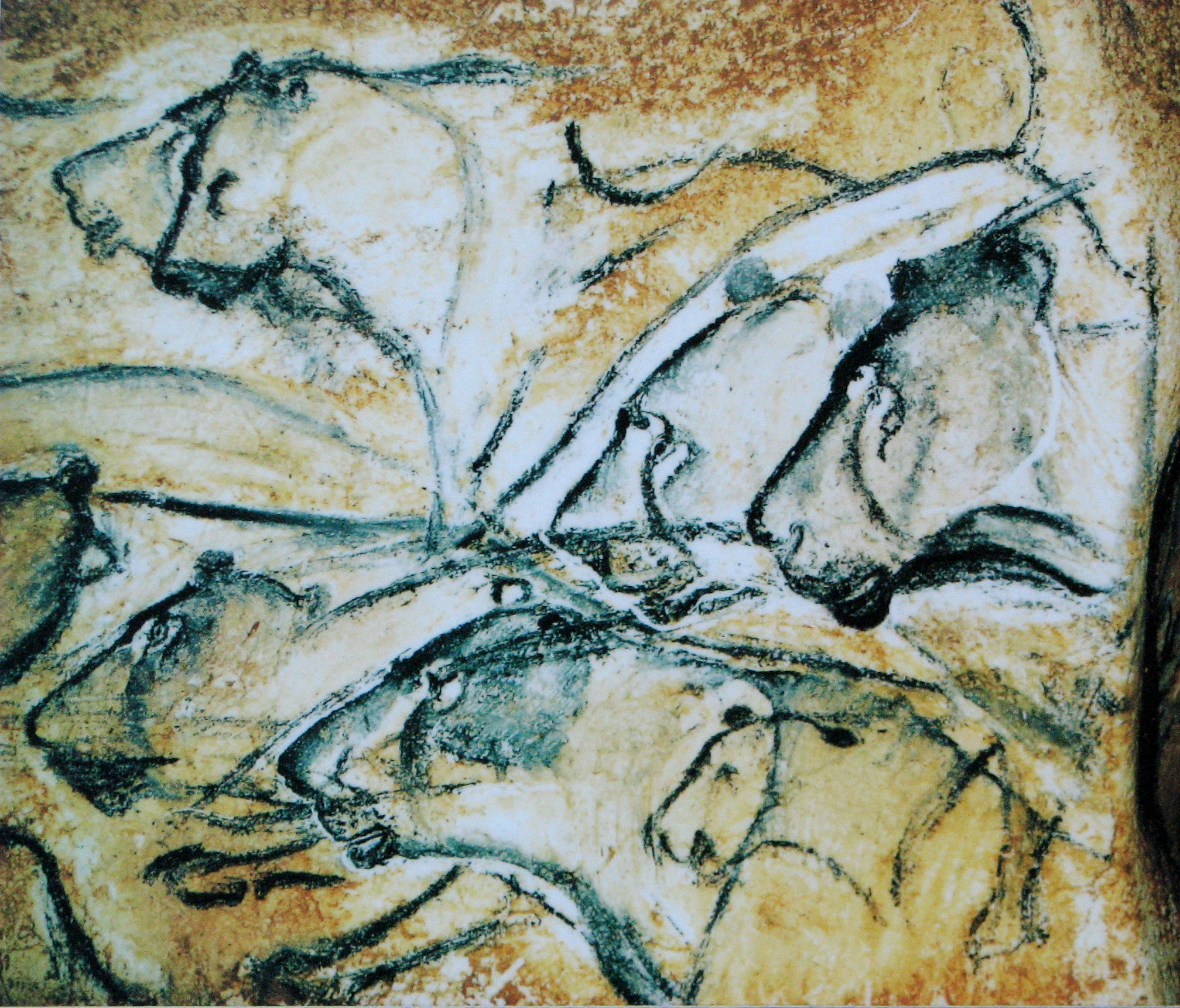
(Replica of) cave lion drawings from Chauvet Cave in Southern France from the Aurignacian period (c. 35,000 to 30,000 years old)

The art of the Upper Paleolithic represents the oldest form of prehistoric art. Figurative art is present in Europe and Southeast Asia, beginning around 50,000 years ago. European Upper Paleolithic art is known informally as "Ice Age art", in reference to the last glacial period.

Non-figurative cave paintings, consisting of hand stencils and simple geometric shapes, are somewhat older, and possibly as old as 64,000 years. This latter estimate is due to a controversial 2018 study based on uranium-thorium dating, which would imply Neanderthal authorship and qualify as art of the Middle Paleolithic.

== Earliest dates ==
The emergence of figurative art has been interpreted as reflecting the emergence of full behavioral modernity, and is part of the defining characteristics separating the Upper Paleolithic from the Middle Paleolithic. The discovery of cave art of comparable age to the oldest European samples in Indonesia has established that similar artistic traditions existed both in eastern and in western Eurasia 40,000 years ago. This has been taken to suggest an artistic tradition dating to more than 50,000 years ago, spread along the southern coast of Eurasia in the original coastal migration movement. In 2018, the discovery of a figurative painting of an unknown animal was announced; it was over 40,000 years old, and was found in a cave on the Indonesian island of Borneo. In July 2021, scientists reported the discovery of a bone carving, one of the world's oldest works of art, made by Neanderthals about 51,000 years ago. On July 3, 2024, the journal Nature published research findings indicating that the cave paintings, which depict anthropomorphic figures interacting with a pig and measure 36 by 15 inches, in Leang Karampuang are approximately 51,200 years old.

== Europe ==
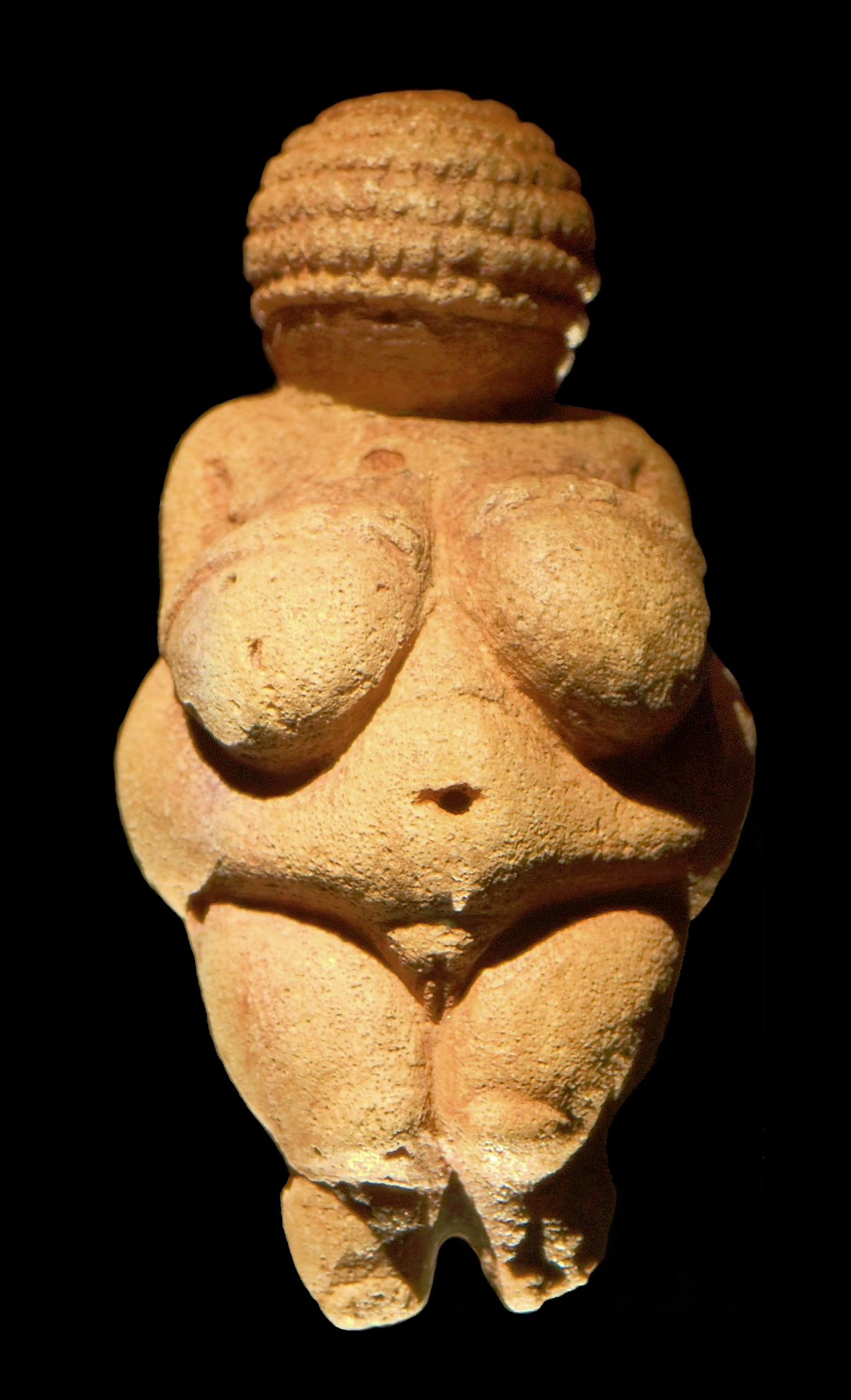
Venus of Willendorf, late Aurignacian (c. 30,000 years old)

Art of the European Upper Paleolithic includes rock and cave painting, jewelry, drawing, carving, engraving and sculpture in clay, bone, antler, stone and ivory, such as the Venus figurines, and musical instruments such as flutes. Decoration was also made on functional tools, such as spear throwers, perforated batons and lamps. Engravings on flat pieces of stones are found in considerable numbers (up to 5,000 at one Spanish site) at sites with the appropriate geology, with the marks sometimes so shallow and faint that the technique involved is closer to drawing – many of these were not spotted by the earliest excavators, and found by later teams in spoil heaps. Painted plaques are less common. It is possible that they were used in rituals, or alternatively heated on a fire and wrapped as personal warmers. Either type of use may account for the many broken examples, often with the fragments dispersed over some distance (up to 30 metres apart at Gönnersdorf). Many sites have large quantities of flat stones apparently used as flooring, with only a minority decorated.

Some of the oldest works of art were found in the Swabian Jura, in Baden-Württemberg, Germany. The Venus figurine known as the Venus of Hohle Fels and the Lion-man of Hohlenstein-Stadel of Hohlenstein-Stadel both date to approximately 40,000 years ago. The so-called Adorant from the Geißenklösterle cave dates to about the same time.

Other fine examples of art from the Upper Palaeolithic (broadly 40,000 to 10,000 years ago) include cave painting (such as at Chauvet, Lascaux, Altamira, and Kapova Cave), incised / engraved cave art such as at Creswell Crags, portable art (such as animal carvings and sculptures like the Venus of Willendorf), and open-air art (such as the rock art of the Côa Valley and Mazouco in Portugal; Domingo García and Siega Verde in Spain; and Fornols-Haut in France). There are numerous carved or engraved pieces of bone and ivory, such as the Swimming Reindeer found in France from the Magdalenian period. These include spear throwers, including one shaped like a mammoth, and many of the type of objects called a bâton de commandement.

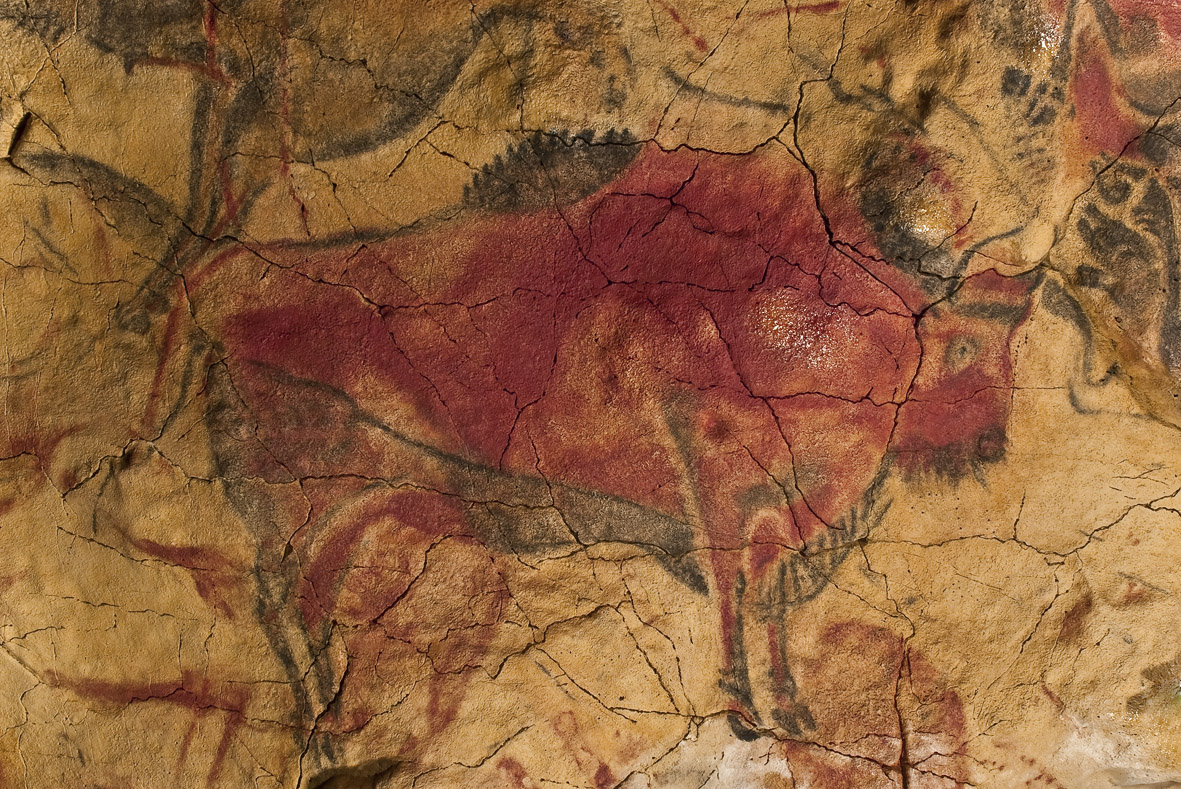
Bison painting (replica) from the Cave of Altamira, dated to the Magdalenian.

The animals depicted primarily consist of prey sought by Paleolithic hunters, including reindeer, horses, bison, mammoth, the woolly rhinoceros, and birds (waterfowl), as well as apex predators such as lions panthers or leopards, hyenas and bears.

Contemporary depictions of humans are comparatively rare; the most notable specimens are almost exclusively Venus figurines, representations of the female form typically placing large emphasis on the breasts and/or buttocks. The Lion-Human statuette of Hohlenstein-Stadel (Aurignacian), an Upper Paleolithic statuette composed of a feline head atop a human (likely female) body, is largely understood as representing a hybrid creature rather than a merely anthropomorphized animal. Other possible hybrid figures include the Shaman of Trois-Frères, the "Bison-man" (also of Trois-Frères) and a similar representation from the Grotte de Gabillou in the Dordogne, and the potentially bird-headed figure as depicted in the Lascaux caves' "Shaft of the Dead Man." Male representations from the Paleolithic are rare. Mesolithic examples include the "Pin Hole man" of Creswell Crags in Derbyshire.

There is evidence for some craft specialization, as well as the transport of materials such as stone and marine shells over considerable distances. Shells from Mediterranean species have been found at Gönnersdorf, over 1,000 kilometres (~621 miles) from their native sea coast. Rising sea levels indicate the likely submersion of the level and nature of Upper Paleolithic coastal settlements, and thus remain unknown.

== Asia ==
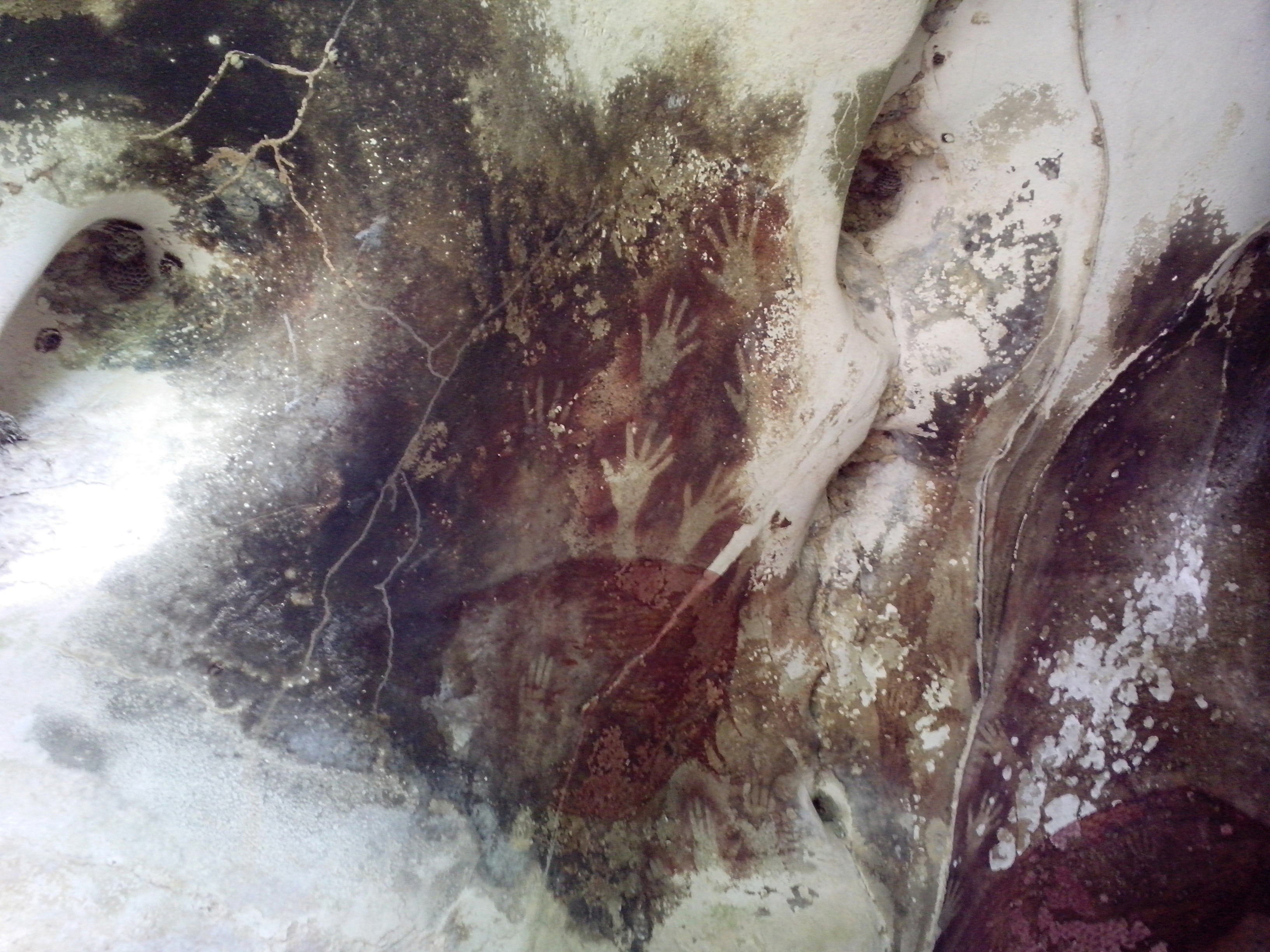
Hand stencils from Leang-Leang Prehistoric Site, Maros, Sulawesi.

Cave paintings from the Indonesian island of Sulawesi, situated in the caves in the district of Maros, were dated based on Uranium–thorium dating in a 2014 study. The oldest dated image was a hand stencil, which was given a minimum age of 39,900 years. A painting of a babirusa was dated to at least 35.4 ka, placing it among the oldest known figurative depictions worldwide.

A cave at Turobong in South Korea containing human remains has been found to contain carved deer bones and depictions of deer that may be as much as 40,000 years old. Petroglyphs of deer or reindeer found at Sokchang-ri may also date to the Upper Paleolithic. Potsherds in a style reminiscent of early Japanese work have been found at Kosan-ri on Jeju island, which, due to lower sea levels at the time, would have been accessible from Japan.

In November 2018, scientists reported the discovery of the oldest known figurative art painting, over 40,000 (perhaps as old as 52,000) years old, of an unknown animal in the cave of Lubang Jeriji Saléh on the Indonesian island of Borneo.

Some Upper Paleolithic artifacts such as the Venus figurines of Mal'ta were found in Southern Siberia, Russia. These figures consist most often of ivory. The figures are about 20,000 years old and stem from the Gravettian. Most of these statuettes show stylized clothes. Quite often the face is depicted. They were discovered at Mal'ta, at the Angara River, near Lake Baikal in Irkutsk Oblast, Siberia.

== Australia ==
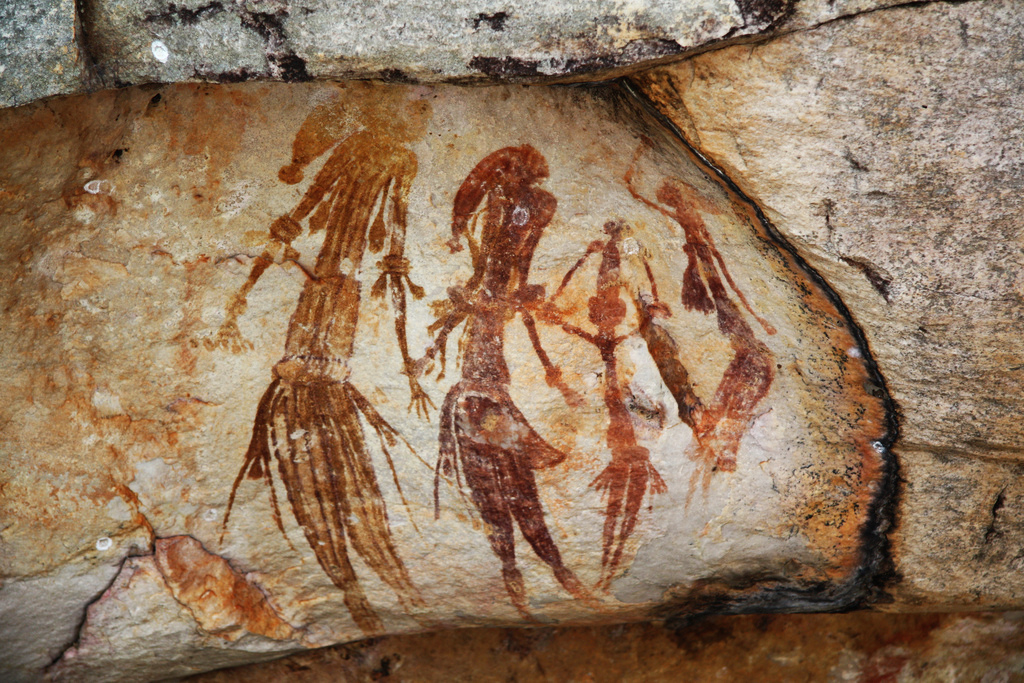
Gwion Gwion rock paintings found in the north-west Kimberley region of Western Australia

Gabarnmung, or Nawarla Gabarnmung, is an Aboriginal archaeological and rock art site in south-western Arnhem Land, in the Top End of Australia's Northern Territory. The rock shelter features prehistoric paintings of fish, including the barramundi, wallabies, crocodiles, people and spiritual figures. Most of the paintings are located on the shelter's ceiling, but many are found on the walls and pillars of the site. The painting on the ceiling has been securely dated to before 27,000 years ago.

Radiocarbon dating of charcoal excavated from the base of the lowest stratigraphic layer of the floor returned a mean age of 45189±1089 years Cal BP suggesting the oldest date for the earliest human habitation. Faceted and use-striated hematite crayons have been recovered from nearby locations (Malakunanja II and Nauwalabila 1) in strata dated from 45,000 to 60,000 years old which suggests that the Gabarnmung shelter may have been decorated from its inception.

The Gwion Gwion rock paintings are a unique form of rock art found in Western Australia. They are predominantly human figures drawn in fine detail with accurate anatomical proportioning. They have been dated at over 17,000 years old.

== Near East and North Africa ==
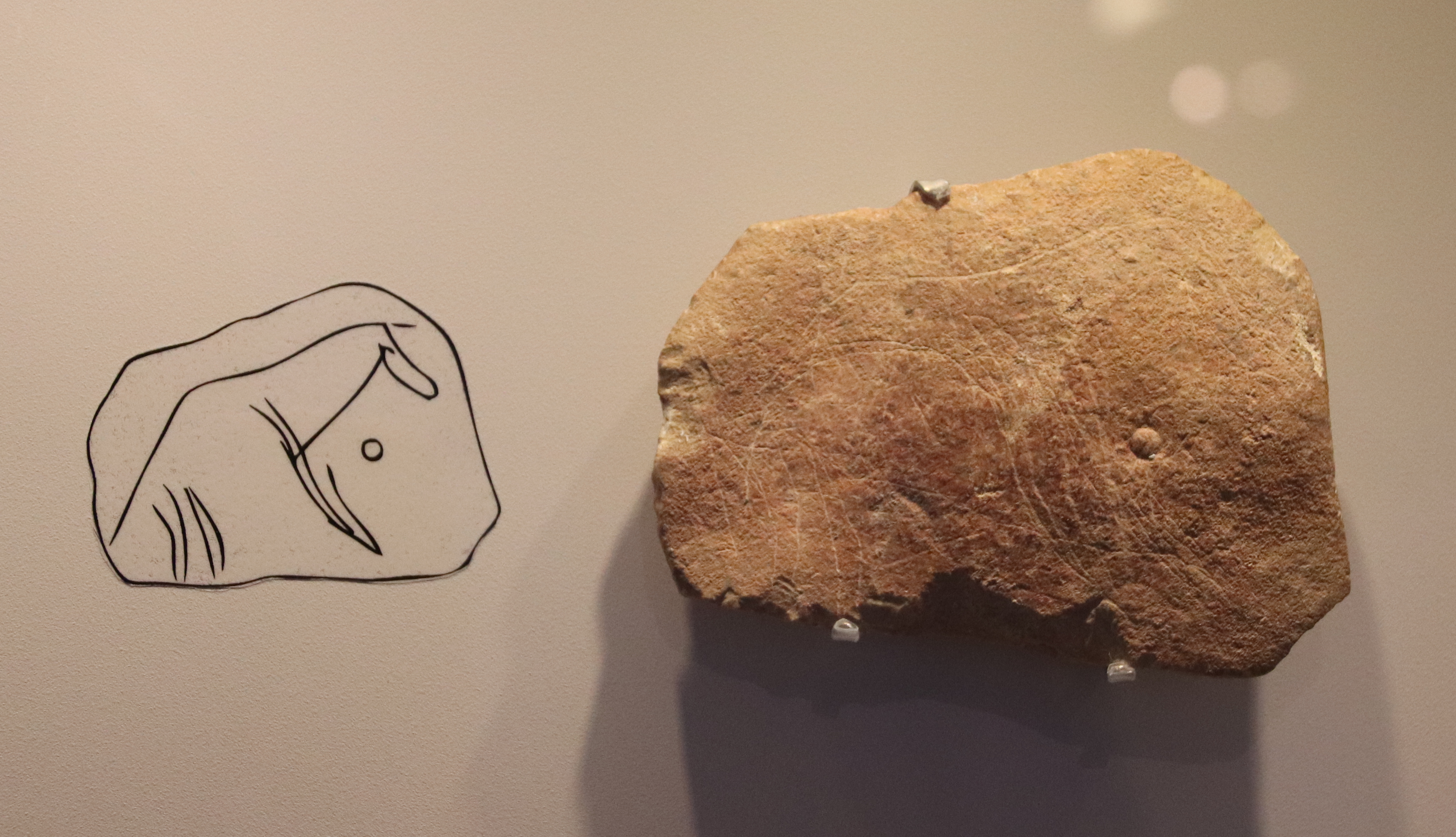
Carving of a horse, Hayonim Cave, Israel, 28000 BP.

Upper Paleolithic sites of the Near East, such as the Hayonim Cave, a cave located in a limestone bluff about 250 meters above modern sea level, in the Upper Galilee, Israel, have wall carvings depicting symbolic shapes and animals, such as a running horse dated to the Levantine Aurignacian circa 28000 BP, and visible in the Israel Museum. This is considered as the first art object found within the context of the Levantine Upper Paleolithic.

Petroglyphs of the North African Mesolithic, such as those at Tassili n'Ajjer, Algeria, are dated to about 12,000 to 10,000 years old.

== Sub-Saharan Africa ==
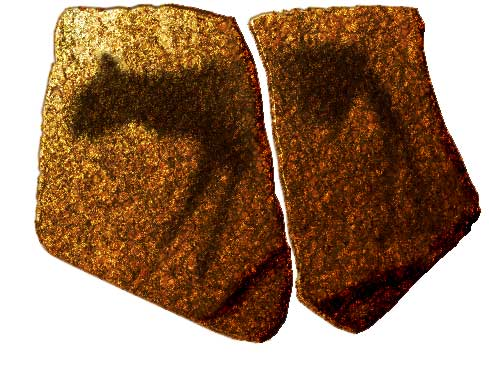
Modern artist's impression of a zoomorphic pictogram like those that would be in Apollo 11 Cave, Namibia

The oldest known figurative art from Sub-Saharan Africa are seven stone plaquettes painted with figures of animals found at the Apollo 11 Cave complex in Namibia, and dated to between 27,500 and 22,500 years ago. There is a substantial amount of rock art attributable to the Bushmen (San) found throughout Southern Africa. Much of this art is recent (as evident from the subject matter depicted, including depictions of wagons and of European settlers wearing hats), but the oldest samples have been tentatively dated to as early as 26,000 years ago.

Matobo National Park, Zimbabwe, has many rock paintings. The oldest examples to 7,000 years ago, possibly as early as 13,000 years ago, while the bulk were likely produced between c. 1,700 and 1,500 years ago. Petroglyphs in West Africa, such as those of Bidzar, Cameroon, are dated to after 3,000 years ago.

== Americas ==
Rock paintings in the Toquepala Caves in southern Peru are dated at ca. 11,500 years ago. Some of the paintings are figurative, notably including a scene of armed men hunting guanaco cameloids. The men are in a posture of attacking the animals with axe, lances, and spear throwers (but not including bow and arrow). The paintings are polychrome, with red made from hematite being the dominant color.

Rock art made by the earliest inhabitants of the Amazon region dates to between 11,800 and 12,600 years ago. The animals depicted include some now extinct, such as mastodons and giant sloths.

Early burial sites in Peru, such as the one at Telarmachay dating from about 10 ka onward, contained evidence of ritual burial, with deposits of red ocher and bead necklaces marking the site.

== See also ==
- Cave painting
- List of Stone Age art
