= Vinxtbach =

Stream in Germany

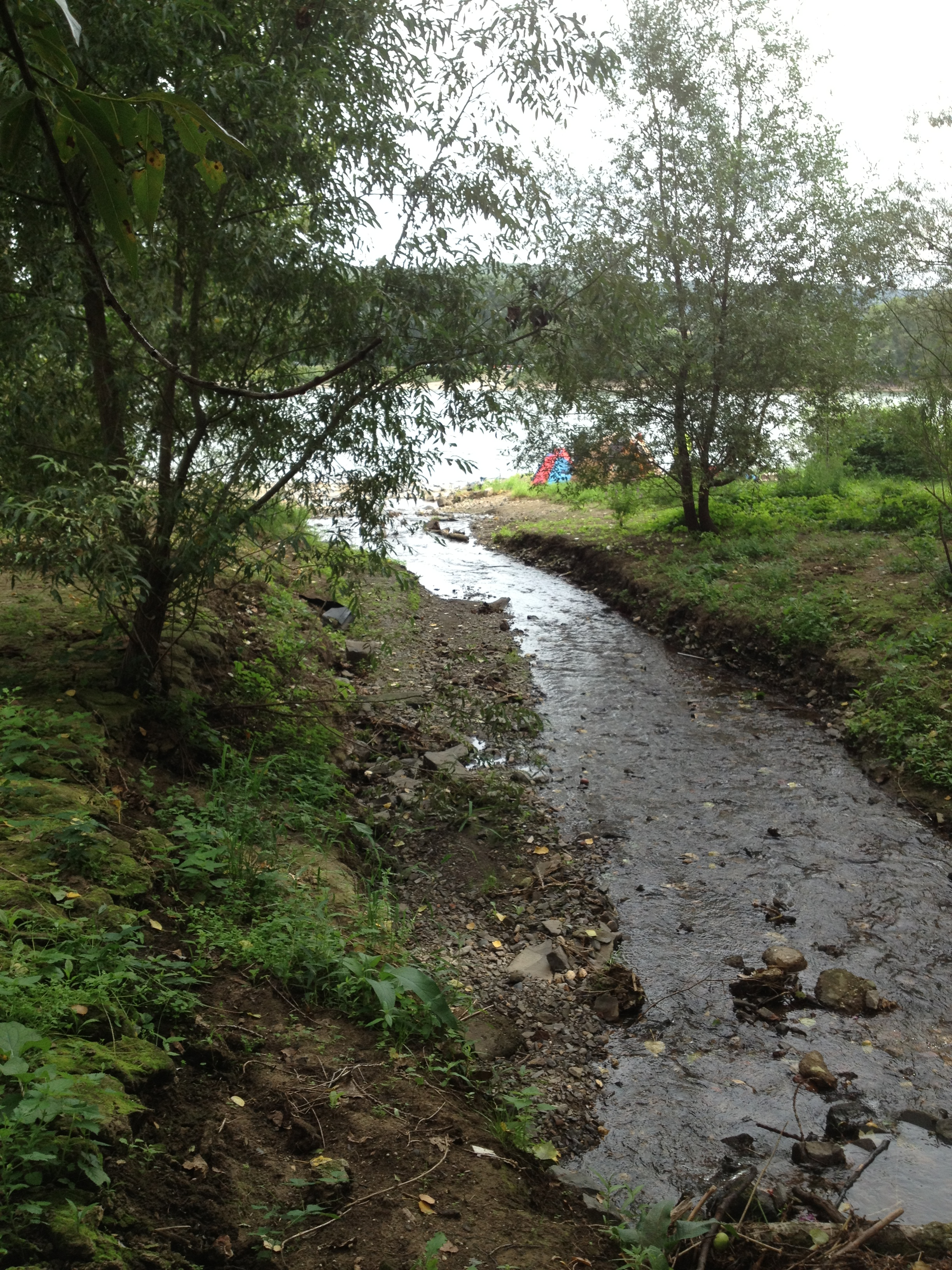
- The mouth of the Vinxtbach

Location
- Country: Germany
- State: Rhineland-Palatinate
- Reference no.: DE: 27174

Physical characteristics
- Source
  - location: South-southwest of Schalkenbach-Obervinxt and east of the Adert
  - coordinates: 50°28′57″N 7°07′09″E
  - elevation: 397 m above sea level (NHN)
- Mouth
  - location: Near Rheineck Castle between Bad Breisig and Brohl-Lützing into the Rhine
  - coordinates: 50°30′05″N 7°18′42″E
  - elevation: 64 m above sea level (NHN)
- Length: 19.11 km (11.87 mi)
- Basin size: 45.472 km^{2} (17.557 sq mi)

Basin features
- Progression: Rhine→ North Sea

The Vinxtbach is a stream of Rhineland-Palatinate, Germany. It is around 19 km (12 mi) long, rises south-southwest of Schalkenbach-Obervinxt and east of the Adert and discharges into the River Rhine near Rheineck Castle between Bad Breisig and Brohl-Lützing.

The name Vinxt is derived from the Latin term finis, which means "border". In ancient Rome, the Vinxtbach marked the border between the provinces Germania Inferior and Germania Superior. In times of the Middle Ages, it was the border between the duchies of Lower Lorraine and Upper Lorraine. Today the Vinxtbach forms a dialect boundary, the "Vinxtbach line" (Vinxtbachlinie): north of the Vinxtbach the Ripuarian dialects are spoken, south of it, the Moselle Franconian dialects.

== See also ==
- List of rivers of Rhineland-Palatinate
