= Kultintern =

Kultintern was an international organization set up to enable the Russian Proletkult organization to work with an international network of contacts alongside the Comintern. Its goal was to spread "proletarian culture". It was first proposed in an issue of Gorn, publication of Proletkult, during the First Congress of the Communist International, March 1919, but practical steps were only taken during the Second Congress of the Communist International.

== Provisional International Bureau ==
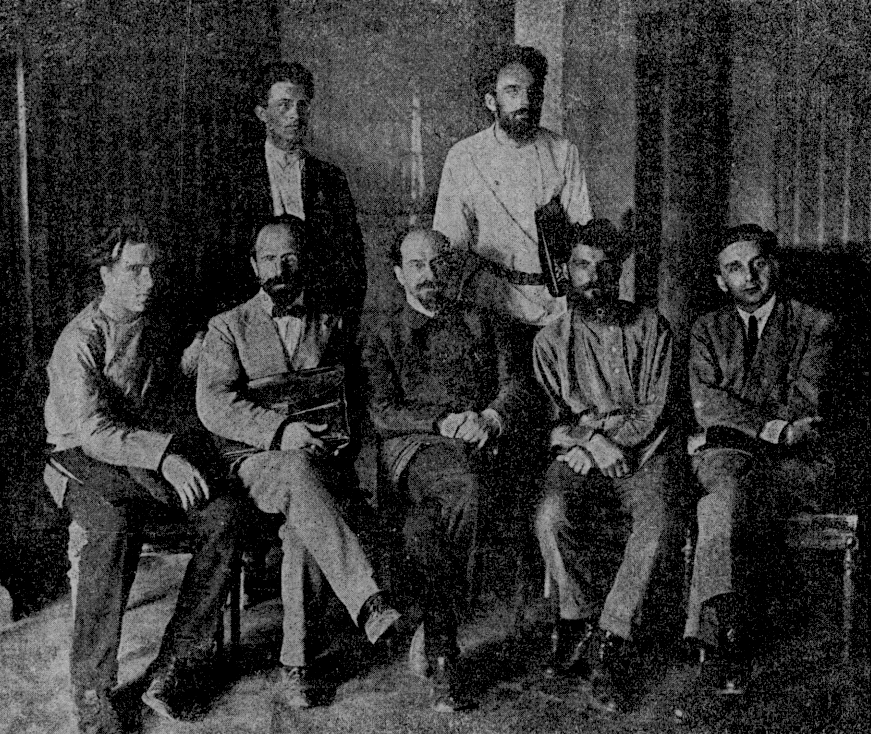
A group of members of the International Bureau of Proletkult. Sitting (left to right): War Van Overstraeten, P. Lebedev-Polyansky (secretary). A. Lunacharsky (chairman), Nicola Bombacci, Wilhelm Herzog, Standing Walther Bringolf, Jules Humbert-Droz

This was set up on 12 August 1920 following the Comintern Congress. The president was Anatoly Lunacharsky and the General Secretary Pavel Lebedev-Polianskii. The Bureau included several international delegates:

Executive Committee

- Wilhelm Herzog (Germany)
- Jules Humbert-Droz (Switzerland)
- Nicola Bombacci (Italy)
- William McLaine (Great Britain)
- Raymond Lefebvre (France)

Others

- Max Barthel (Germany)
- John Reed (USA)
- Tom Quelch (Great Britain)
- Karl Toman (Austria)
- War Van Overstraeten (Belgium)
- Haavard Langseth (Norway)
- Walther Bringolf (Switzerland)

== Criticism ==
Leo Pasvolsky was one of the first people to criticize the formation of Kultintern. First he portrayed the movement as generally exhibiting a heavy monotony with poetry which was both facile and pretentious. However he further claimed that the foundation of Kultintern would reduce the Proletkult movement "not primarily, but exclusively" to a weapon to promote the Bolshevik view of communism.

== See also ==
- Akasztott Ember, a Hungarian avant-garde arts magazine which advocated "the formation of an "International Cultural Revolutionary Internationale to be realized through the Proletkult network" in 1922.
