= Walther Bringolf =

Swiss politician (1895–1981)

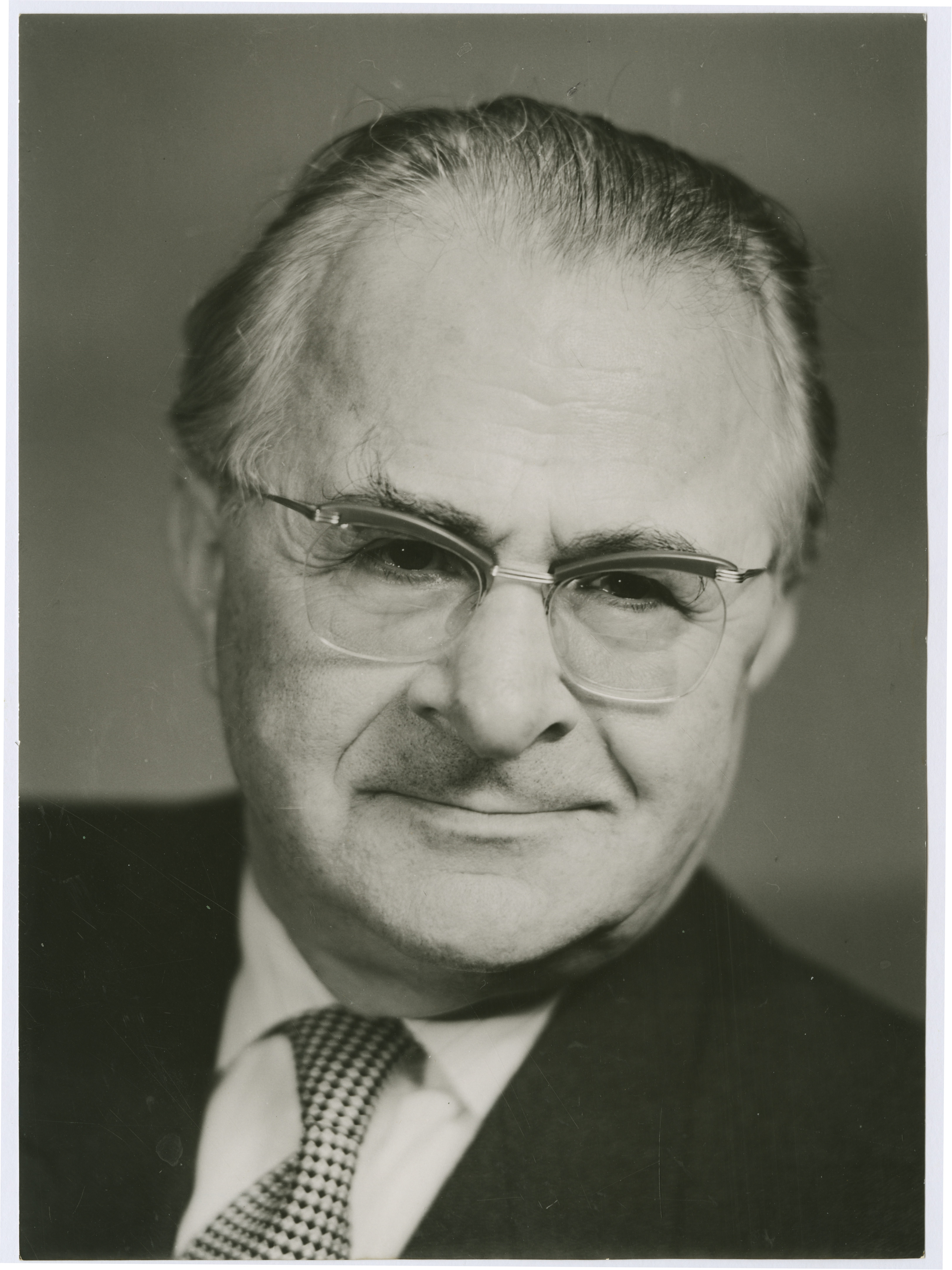
Walther Bringolf

Walther Bringolf (1 August 1895 – 24 March 1981) was a former President of the National Council of Switzerland (1961–1962). He was a member of the Social Democratic Party of Switzerland and was a long-time mayor of Schaffhausen (1933–1968).

== Communist activities ==
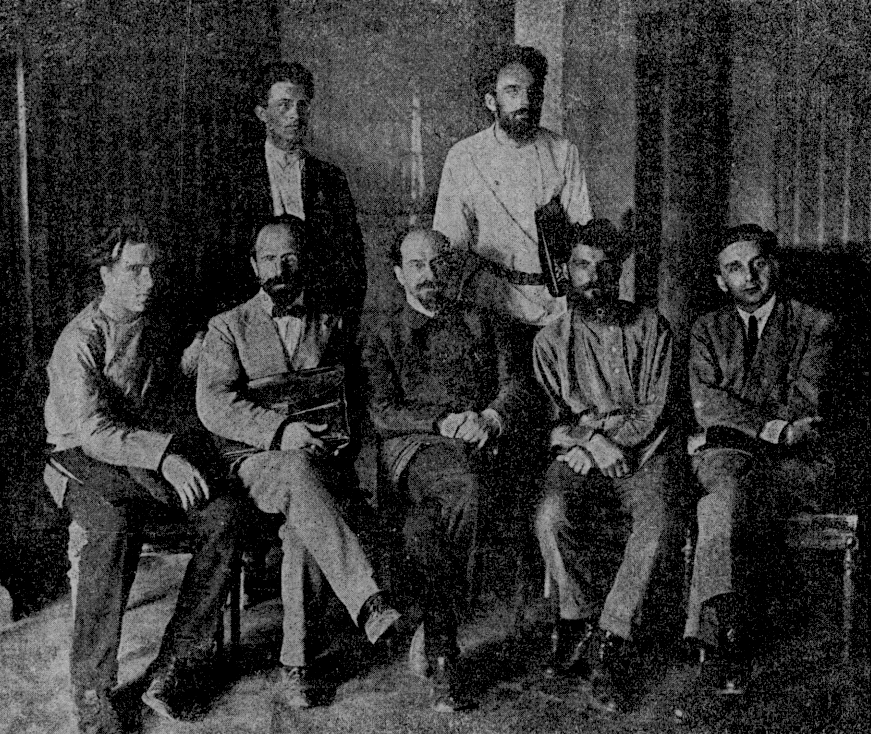
A group of members of the International Bureau of Proletkult. Sitting (left to right): War Van Overstraeten, P. Lebedev-Polyansky (secretary). Anatoly Lunacharsky (chairman), Nicola Bombacci, Wilhelm Herzog, Standing Walther Bringolf, Jules Humbert-Droz

Bringolf sympathised with the Russian Revolution and attended the Second Congress of the Third International. Whilst there he attended the Kultintern conference and joined their Provisional International Bureau.

Preceded by Emil Duft	President of the National Council; 1961/1962	Succeeded by André Guinand
