= Brohlbach (Rhine) =

River in Germany

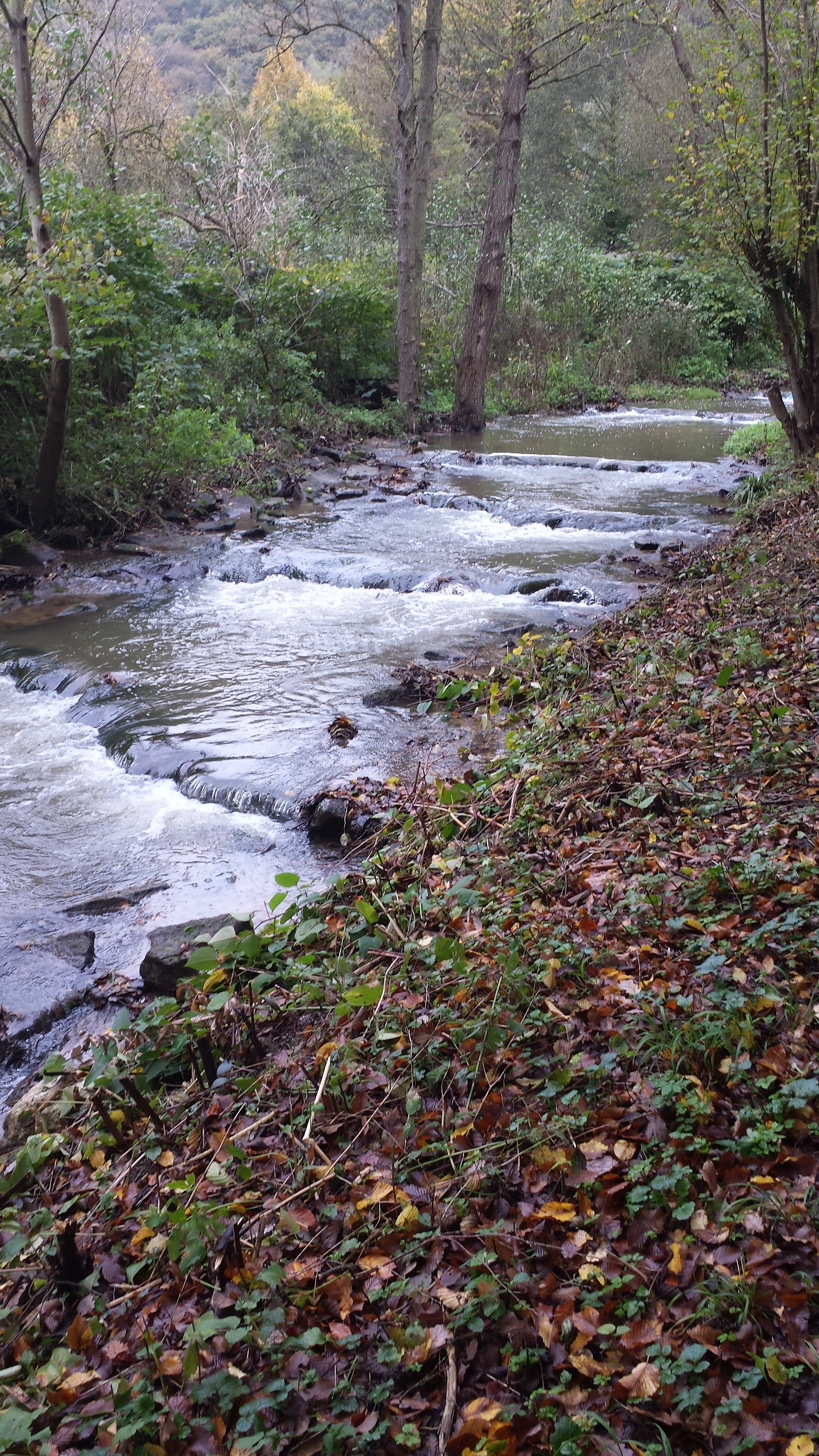
- The Brohlbach shortly before its mouth

Location
- Country: Germany
- State: Rhineland-Palatinate

Physical characteristics
- Mouth: Rhine
  - location: Brohl-Lützing, Ahrweiler
  - coordinates: 50°29′05″N 7°19′56″E
- Length: 19.8 km (12.3 mi)

Basin features
- Progression: Rhine→ North Sea

Brohlbach is a river of Rhineland-Palatinate, Germany. It is a left tributary of the Rhine at Brohl-Lützing.

The valley of the Brohlbach is called Brohltal (Brohl Valley), not Brohlbachtal (Brohlbach Valley).

== See also ==
- List of rivers of Rhineland-Palatinate
