= Jules Humbert-Droz =

Swiss pastor and journalist

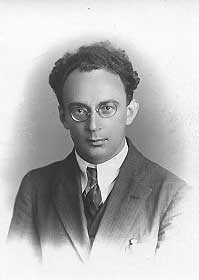
- Humbert-Droz in 1926
- Born: September 23, 1891; La Chaux-de-Fonds, Switzerland
- Died: October 16, 1971 (aged 80); La Chaux-de-Fonds, Switzerland
- Political party: Social Democratic Party of Switzerland (1911–1921; 1943–unknown); Communist Party of Switzerland (1921–1943)
- Spouse: Eugénie Perret

Jules-Frédéric Humbert-Droz (23 September 1891 in La Chaux-de-Fonds – 16 October 1971) was a Swiss pastor, journalist, socialist and communist. A founding member of the Communist Party of Switzerland, he held high Comintern office through the 1920s and also acted as Comintern emissary to several west European countries. He was involved in the Right Opposition in 1928. He rejoined the Swiss Socialist Party in the 1940s and served as its secretary from 1946 to 1965.

== Early life ==
He was born in a working-class family of watchmakers with socialist beliefs. His grandfather was a member of the International Workingsmen's Association. Humbert joined the Social Democratic Party of Switzerland (Swiss Socialist Party) in 1911, at the age of 20. After studying Protestant theology in Neuchâtel, Paris and Berlin, he wrote a thesis about Socialism and christianism. He became a pastor in 1914 and started writing in the socialist daily newspaper La Sentinelle soon after.

He married Eugénie (Jenny) Perret in 1916, who would accompany him throughout his political life; she became known as Jenny Humbert-Droz.

== Political life ==
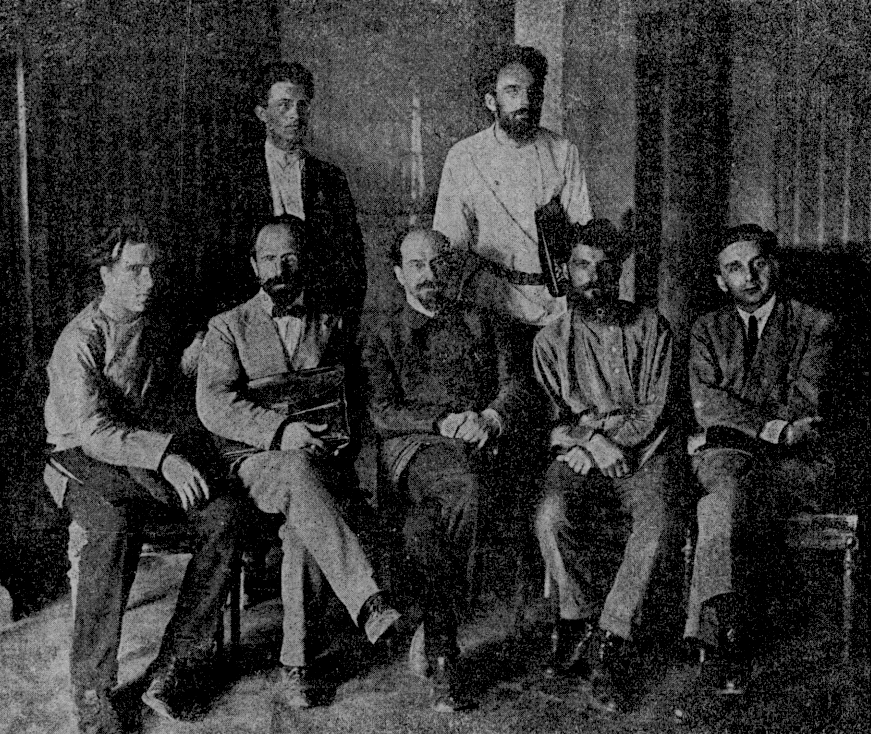
A group of members of the International Bureau of Proletkult Sitting (left to right): War Van Overstraeten, Pavel Lebedev-Polianskii (secretary).Anatoly Lunacharsky (chairman), Nicola Bombacci, Wilhelm Herzog, Standing Walther Bringolf, Jules Humbert-Droz

Humbert-Droz opposed the First World War and refused to serve in the Swiss Army, for which he was imprisoned. He received another jail sentence for his participation the 1918 Swiss general strike. He supported the Bolshevik Revolution and travelled with Walther Bringolf to Russia to represent the left wing of the Social Democratic Party of Switzerland. There, both of them joined the Provisional International Bureau of the Kultintern.

In 1921, at the Third International Congress of the Comintern, Humbert-Droz was elected secretary of the Communist International, on the proposal of Vladimir Lenin himself. Humbert-Droz became after 1920 an outstanding leader in the international communist movement and travelled all around the world to organize the national sections of the Comitern. He exerted some control over the French Communist Party and called himself the eye of Moscow in Paris. He eventually became the first director of the Latin Secretariat of the Comintern. He was an ally and friend of Nikolai Bukharin. After the 6th World Congress of the Communist International, Bukharin was politically isolated and only few people in the Moscow Apparatus stayed loyal to him, including Humbert-Droz, who was disgraced along with his ally.

Their friendship later ended. He stated in his 1971 Mémoires that it was because in his last encounter with Bukharin in 1929, Bukharin said that he had sought to establish contact the Zinoviev-Kamenev faction in order to enlist their support in removing Stalin from the leadership and that Bukharin also told him he was planning to use individual terror (assassination) against Stalin. Humbert-Droz writes that he replied to Bukharin by criticising any rapprochement with Zinoviev and Kamenev and argued that resorting to individual terror would destroy the Bolshevik leadership.

Boukharine me dit aussi qu'ils avaient decide d'utiliser la terreur individuelle pour se debarrasser de Staline. [Bukharin also told me that they had decided to use individual terror in order to rid themselves of Stalin].

He managed to re-enter the Executive Committee of the Communist International after self-criticizing and capitulating. In 1943, he was definitely expelled from the Swiss Communist Party. Aware of his worth and experience, the Swiss Socialist Party invited him to return to his original party, where he was party secretary until 1959 and then secretary of the Neuchâtel cantonal section of the party until 1965.

He retired to La Chaux-de-Fonds but remained politically active. He fought the atomic armament of Switzerland and contributed to various journals. Toward the end of his life, he undertook the writing of his memoirs, published between 1969 and 1973.

== Works ==
- L’œil de Moscou à Paris, 1922–1924 (1964)
- L'origine de l'Internationale communiste : de Zimmerwald à Moscou (1968)
- Mémoires

1, Mon évolution du tolstoïsme au communisme, 1891–1921 (1969)
2, De Lénine à Staline, dix ans au service de l'Internationale communiste, 1921–1931 (1971)
3, Dix ans de lutte antifasciste : 1931–1941 (1972)
4, Le couronnement d'une vie de combat : 1941–1971 (1973)
