= Rheinhöhenweg Trail =

Hiking trail in Germany

Rheinhöhenweg
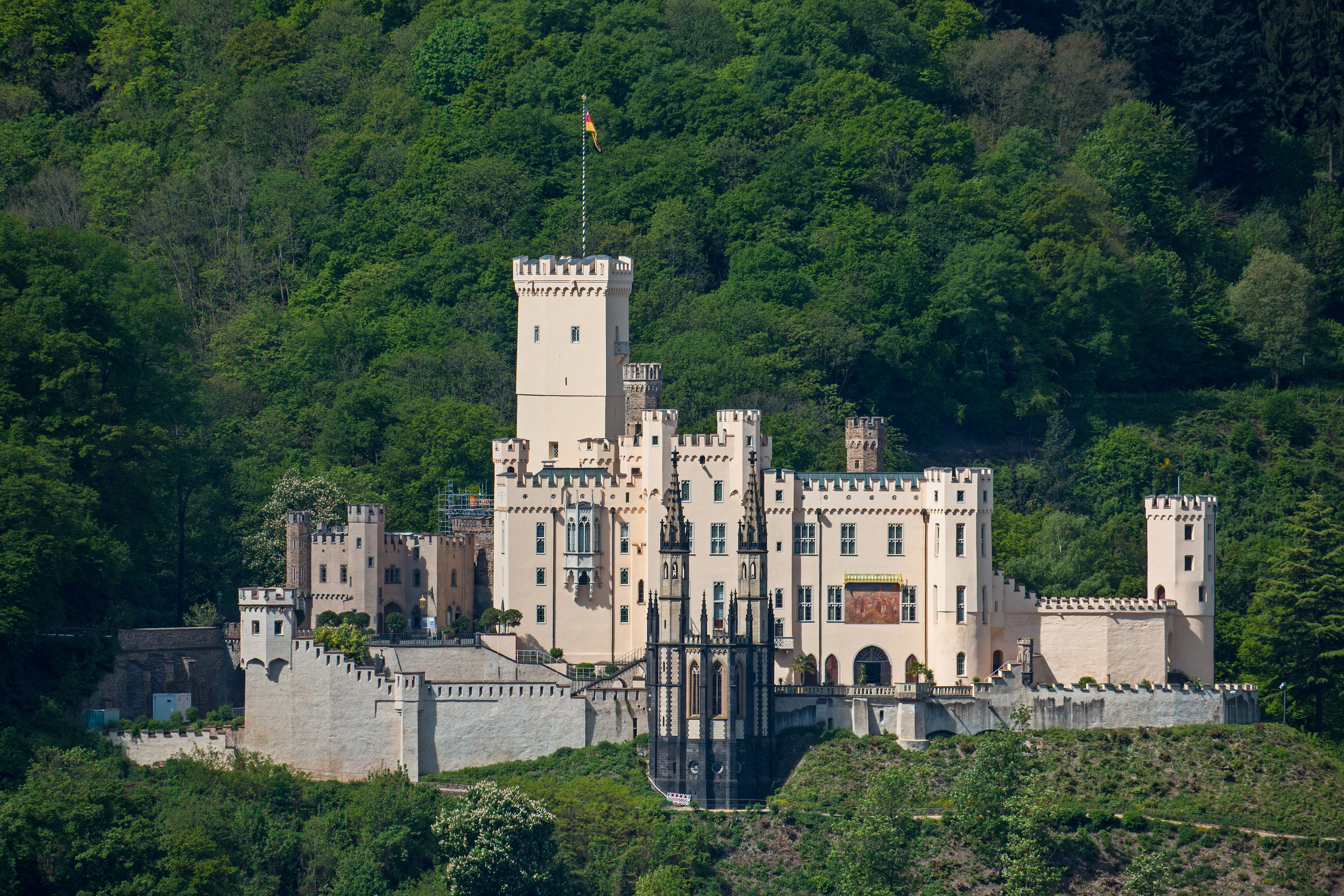
- The trail passes Schloss Stolzenfels
- Length: 240 km (150 mi)
- Location: North Rhine-Westphalia, Rhineland-Palatinate, Hesse, Germany
- Trailheads: Bonn→Alsheim (left side), Bonn-Beuel→Wiesbaden (right side)
- Use: Hiking
- Difficulty: Easy
- Season: All year
- Sights: Numerous castles at the river Rhine.

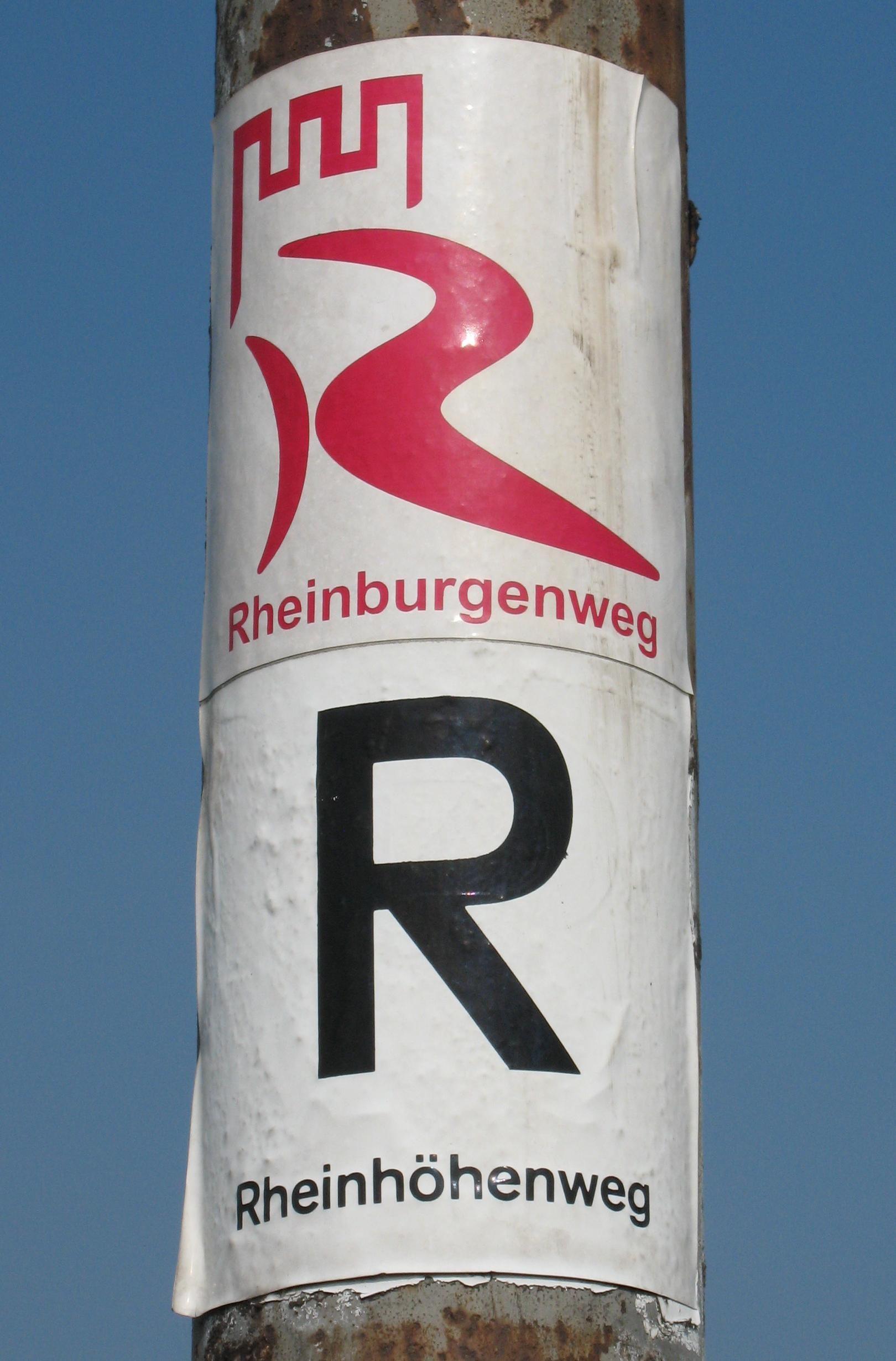
Rheinburgenweg Trail and Rheinhöhenweg Trail in Brohl-Lützing

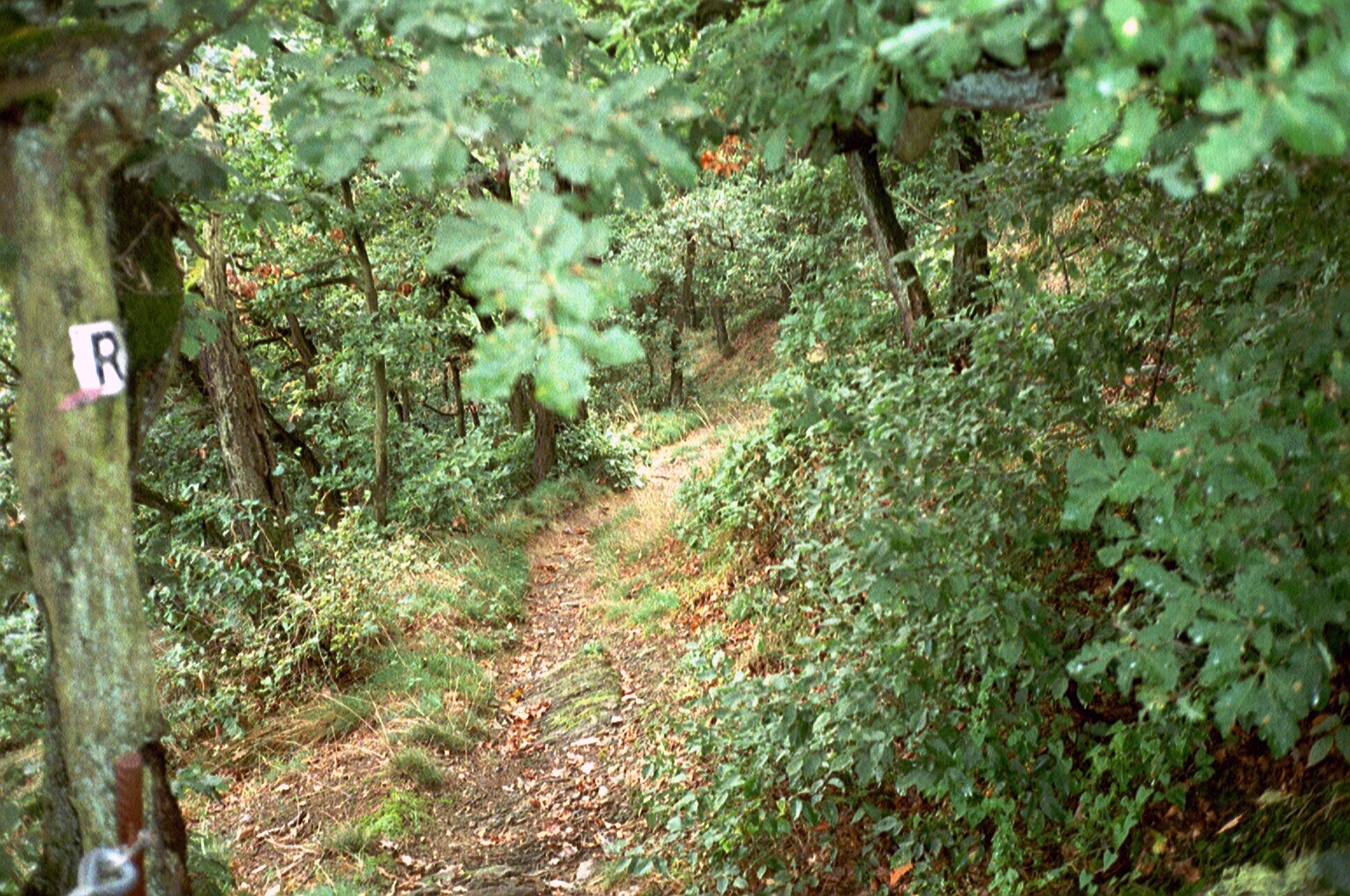
Rheinhöhenweg Trail

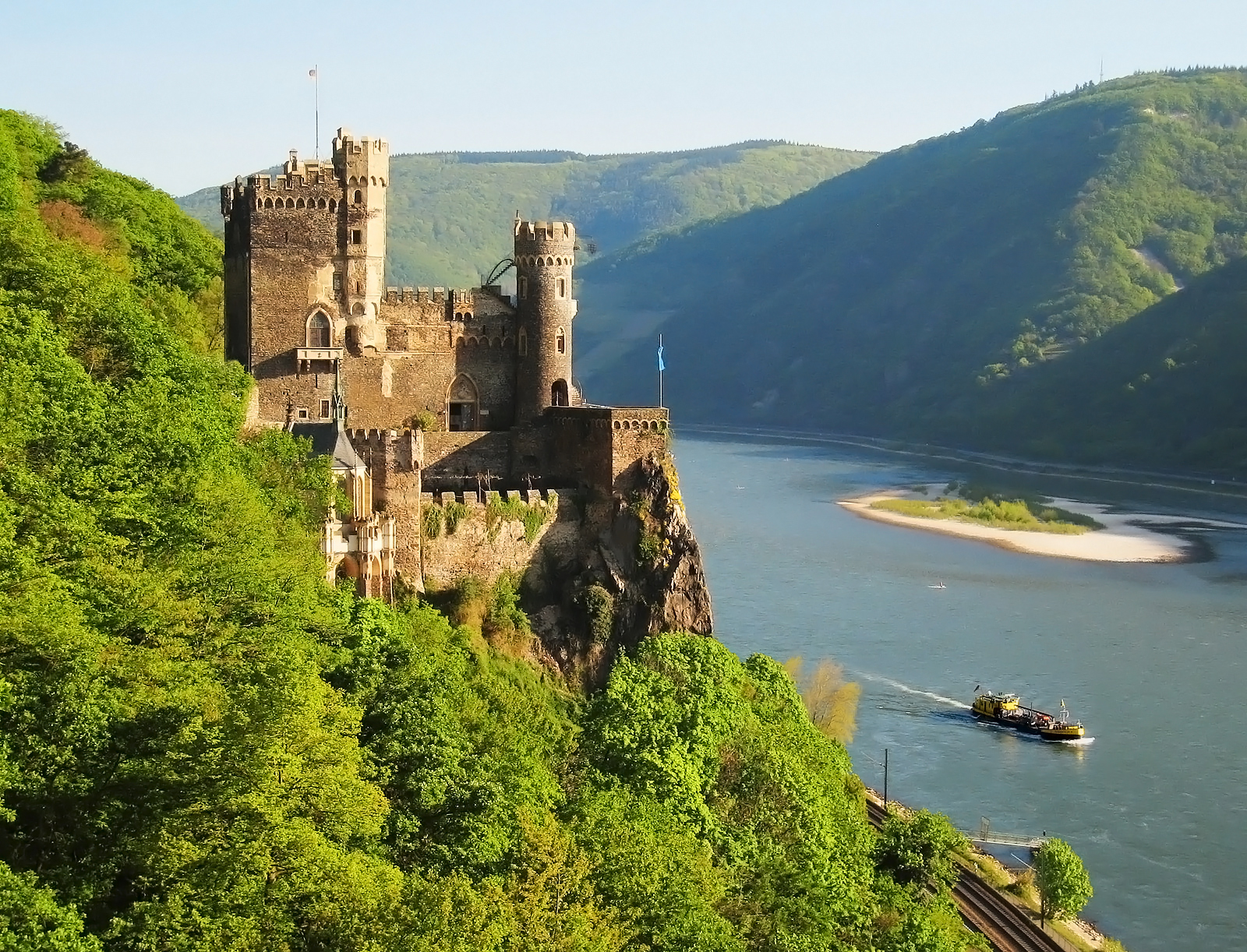
Rheinstein Castle near Bingen

The Rheinhöhenweg Trail is a popular hiking trail on the mountains of the Rhine Valley. It leads from the Lower Rhine in Bonn passing the Loreley up to the Upper Rhine. There is a Rheinhöhenweg Trail on both sides of the Rhine River. On the left side it goes from Bonn to Alsheim, which is to the south of Mainz, with a total length of 240 km. On the right side it goes from Bonn-Beuel to Wiesbaden with a total length of 272 km. Both trails together have a combined length of over 500 km. The Rheinhöhenweg Trail is marked by a black R on a white background. The trails on the left and on the right side are frequently connected by hiking trails called "Rheinhöhen Connection Trails", marked by the sign "RV".

The Rheinhöhenweg Trail passes a vast number of famous castles like the Godesburg, Lahneck Castle, Stolzenfels Castle, Castle Rheineck, Rheinstein Castle, Drachenburg Palace and many others.
