= Langseth =

Langseth is a surname. Notable people with the surname include:

- Haavard Langseth (1888–1968), Norwegian political activist
- Hans Langseth (1846–1927), Norwegian-American who held the record for the world's longest beard
- Keith Langseth (born 1938), American politician
- Lisa Langseth (born 1975), Swedish screenwriter and film director
