= Bad Breisig (Verbandsgemeinde) =

- Verbandsgemeinde
- Coat of arms

- Location of Bad Breisig within Landkreis Ahrweiler district
- Interactive map of Bad Breisig
- Location within Germany Location within Rhineland-Palatinate
- Coordinates: 50.509351°N 7.298007°E
- Country: Germany
- State: Rhineland-Palatinate
- District: Landkreis Ahrweiler
- Subdivisions: 4 Gemeinden

Government
  - Mayor (2020–28): Marcel Caspers

Area
  - Total: 41.82 km^{2} (16.15 sq mi)

Population (2025-12-31)
  - Total: 13,710
  - Density: 327.8/km^{2} (849.1/sq mi)
- Time zone: UTC+01:00 (CET)
  - Summer (DST): UTC+02:00 (CEST)
- Vehicle registration: AW
- Website: www.bad-breisig.de

Bad Breisig is a Verbandsgemeinde ("collective municipality") in the district of Ahrweiler, in Rhineland-Palatinate, Germany. The seat of the municipality is in Bad Breisig.

The Verbandsgemeinde Bad Breisig consists of the following Ortsgemeinden ("local municipalities"):

Municipality	Area (km²)	Population
Bad Breisig *	19.94	9661
Brohl-Lützing	9.23	2526
Gönnersdorf	5.04	639
Waldorf	7.61	884
Verbandsgemeinde Bad Breisig	41.82	13710

^{*} seat of the Verbandsgemeinde
