= Adorant from the Geißenklösterle cave =

Upper Paleolithic mammoth ivory engraving

The Adorant from the Geißenklösterle cave is a 35,000–32,000 year-old carved section of mammoth ivory, with a depiction of a human figure. It was discovered in the Geißenklösterle cave in the Swabian Jura near Blaubeuren, Germany in 1979.

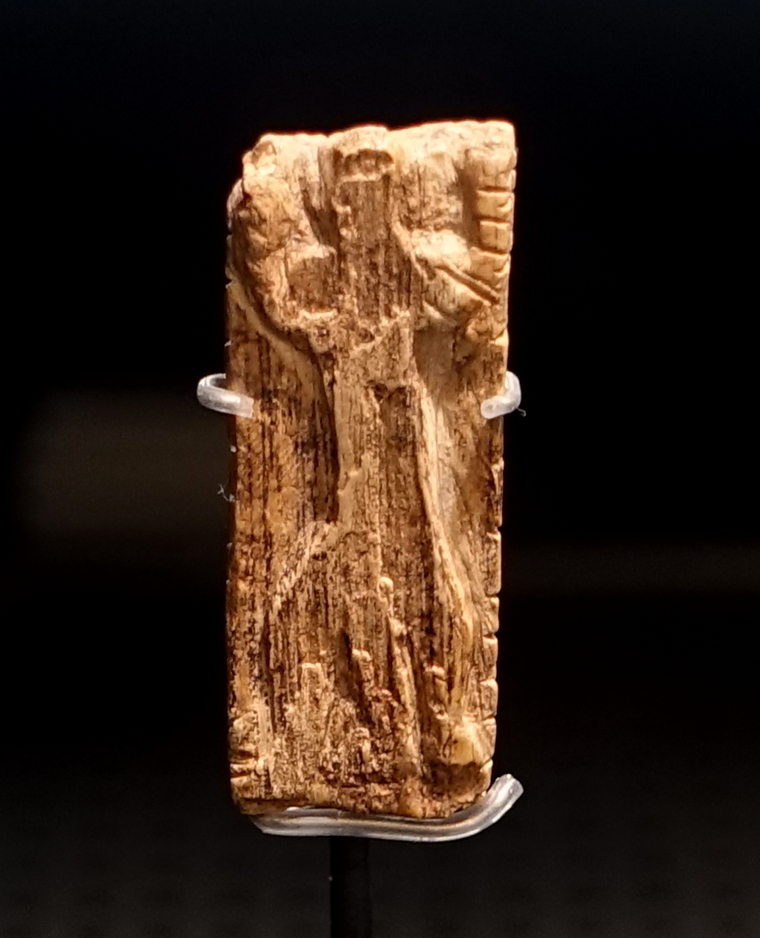
Adorant from the Geißenklösterle cave, mammoth ivory, Landesmuseum Württemberg

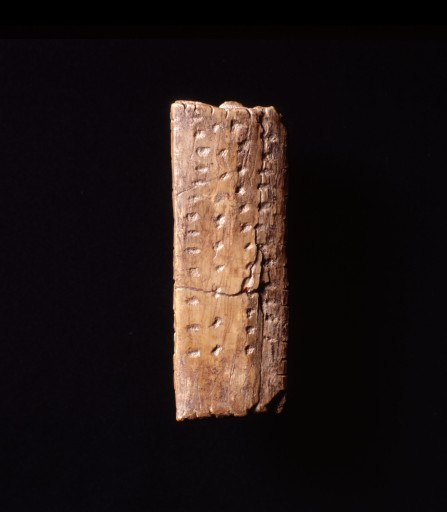
Adorant from the Geißenklösterle cave, reverse side with rows of notches

== Significance ==
The object (or 'plate') is an exceptional artwork, demonstrating a highly developed aesthetic ability within the Aurignacian culture of the early Upper Palaeolithic.

It is one of several figurative works of art of the Upper Palaeolithic discovered in the cave.

== Description and interpretation ==
The engraved mammoth tusk is a well-preserved, rectangular piece: 38 mm (1.50 in) tall, 14 mm (0.55 in) wide, and 4.5 mm (0.18 in) thick.

Traces of manganese and ochre can be found on it by microscope analysis. The mineral ochre was often used during Palaeolithic rituals.

=== Front Face (Side A) ===
The front face has a human figure (anthropoid) of uncertain sex in relief, with raised arms and outstretched legs, but no hands.

The posture is usually interpreted as an expression of worship, which is why in German the figure is called an 'adorant', a word meaning 'worshipper'.

It has been claimed that a belt and sword can be seen, although these are probably natural features of the ivory.

=== Reverse Face (Side B) ===
On the plate's reverse are 88 small notches in rows.

== Discovery and display ==
The object was discovered during an excavation in 1979. Excavations took place at the Geißenklösterle cave between 1973 and 1991, and have continued since 2001.

It is now in the collection of the Landesmuseum Württemberg, Stuttgart. Replicas are used for public display, as the original is accessible only for scientific examination.

== See also ==
- Art of the Upper Palaeolithic
- Aurignacian
- Lion-man of Hohlenstein-Stadel
- List of Stone Age art
- Prehistoric art
- Prehistoric Europe
- Upper Palaeolithic
- Venus figurines
- Venus of Hohle Fels

== Literature ==
- Joachim Hahn, 1980: "Eine aurignacienzeitliche Menschendarstellung aus dem Geißenklösterle bei Blaubeuren, Alb-Donau-Kreis". In: Denkmalpflege in Baden-Württemberg – Nachrichtenblatt der Landesdenkmalpflege, Vol. 9, Nr. 2 (1980), S. 56-58.
- Joachim Hahn, 1988: Die Geißenklösterle-Höhle im Achtal bei Blaubeuren, Stuttgart: Karl Theiss Verlag.
- C.–S. Holdermann, Müller-Beck, H. and Simon, U., 2001: Eiszeitkunst im süddeutschschweizerischen Jura: Anfänge der Kunst,, Stuttgart: Karl Theiss Verlag.
- H. Müller-Beck und G. Albrecht (Ed.), 1987: Die Anfänge der Kunst vor 30000 Jahren, Stuttgart: Theiss.
