= Raymond Lefebvre =

French writer and political activist

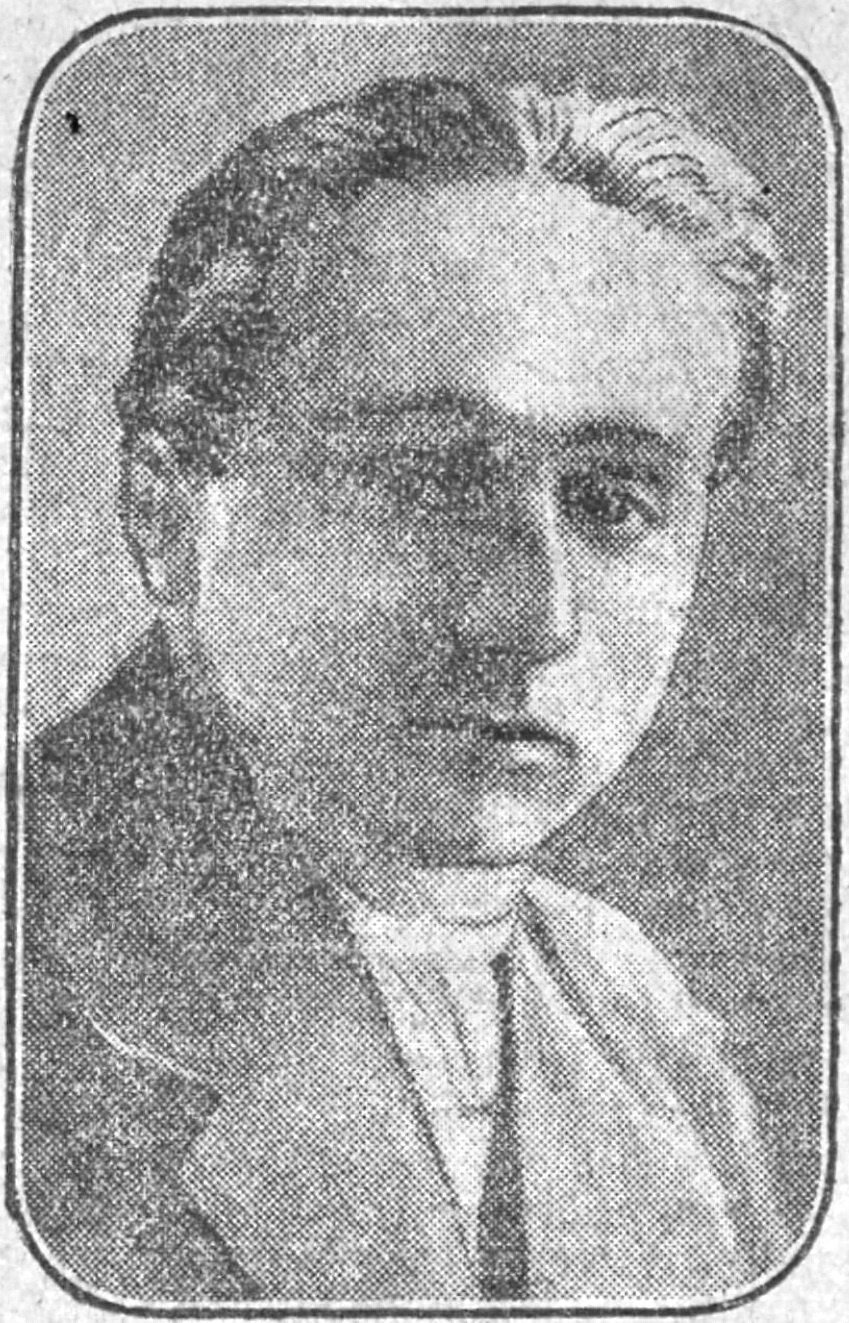
Raymond Lefebvre

Raymond-Louis Lefebvre (24 April 1891, Vire – presumed date of death 1 October 1920) was a French writer and political activist. He attended the 2nd World Congress of the Comintern from 19 July to 7 August 1920, but along with two other French delegates disappeared in the Barents Sea whilst returning.

Lefebvre served as a soldier during the First World War and in 1917 described his experiences in Le sacrifice d'Abraham ("The Sacrifice of Abraham"). He had been wounded and was revolted by the whole experience. This work placed him alongside Henri Barbusse, Georges Duhamel, Marcel Martinet – amongst others – as one of the writers who developed a revolutionary perspective during the war. He was involved in setting up a radical veterans' association, the Association Républicaine des Anciens Combattants.

After attending the 2nd Congress of the Comintern, he was appointed to the Provisional International Bureau of the Kultintern, an organisation set up to promote proletarian culture.
