= Karl Toman =

Austrian politician (1884–1950)

Karl Toman (2 January 1884 – 5 February 1950) was an Austrian politician and trade unionist. Toman hailed from a working-class family. He went on to become a metal industry worker.

Toman joined the Social Democratic Labour Party of Austria in 1898. In the run-up to the First World War, Toman served as secretary of the Goldsmiths' Trade Union. He was taken as a prisoner of war in Russia, and went on to fight on the Soviet side in the Russian Civil War. Toman becoming a leading figure in the Communist Party of Austria. He served as general secretary of the party for a brief period in 1920. He belonged to the party leadership until 1924. Toman represented the Communist Party of Austria at the second (1920) and third congresses (1921) of the Communist International. He took part in the fifth congress of the Communist International in 1924 as a non-voting delegate, representing of the inner-party minority in Austria. He was expelled from the party on August 31, 1924.

In August 1925 he was readmitted to the Communist Party as a member. He worked with the Red International of Labour Unions (Profintern), having been appointed secretary of the Trade Union Sector of the Central Committee of the Communist Party in 1928. At the Profintern congress of 1930, held in Moscow, Toman was elected to the central council of the international body. He moved to Moscow, working as instructor at the Organizational Department of Profintern. Toman relocation to the Soviet Union was seen as a way of resolving the fractional frictions inside the Austrian Communist Party.

In the Soviet Union, Toman was accused of mismanagement of funds. In September 1931 he was sacked from Profintern. He was given a new employment at a sailor's club in Leningrad, politically demoted. Having returned to Austria in 1932, Toman was finally stripped of his Communist Party membership.

Toman joined the Revolutionary Socialists in 1934. He was detained at the Wöllersdorf prison camp, but was released in 1935. After Anschluss (German annexation of Austria in 1938) Toman was threatened with imprisonment at the Dachau concentration camp. He was however able to negotiate a release from captivity, citing his expulsion from the Communist Party. He undertook a loyalty oath to the Third Reich. In April 1938 German authorities appointed him as a member of the local administration of Eichgraben. In January 1940 he joined the National Socialist German Workers Party (NSDAP) and SA.

Toman was captured by Soviet troops in May 1945. He died in a Soviet Gulag prison camp on February 5, 1950. There are very few documented cases of former Austrian communists having joined the NSDAP, Toman being the most prominent amongst them. There is little written about Toman's political journey, but speculation points towards blunt opportunism.
