= Gönnersdorf =

- Municipality
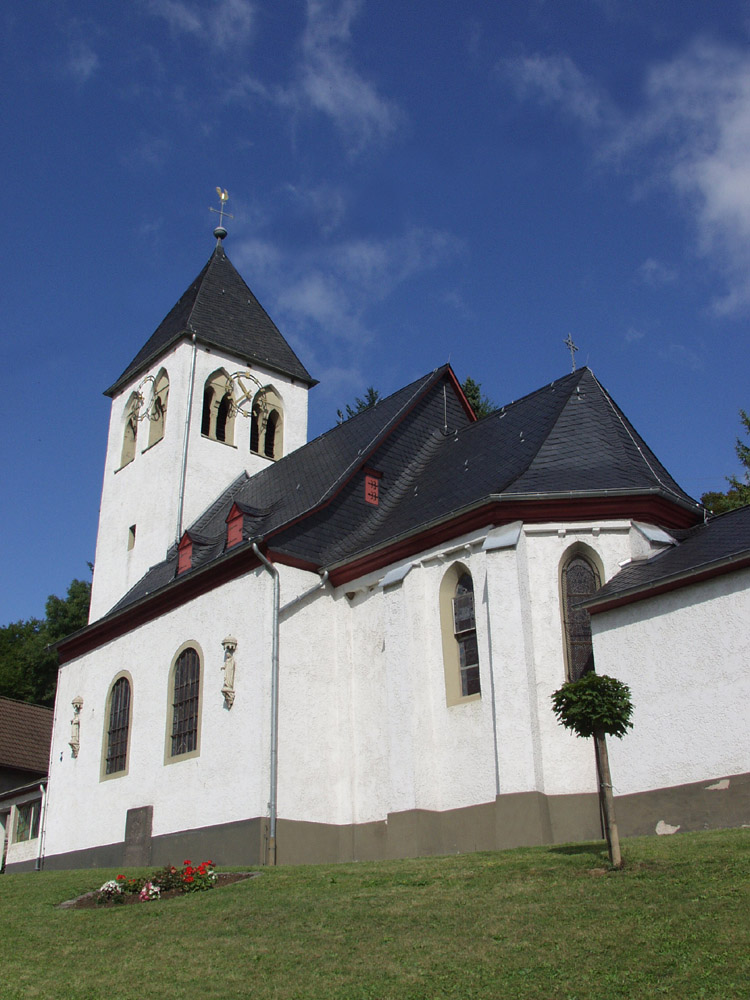
- St. Stephen church in Gönnersdorf

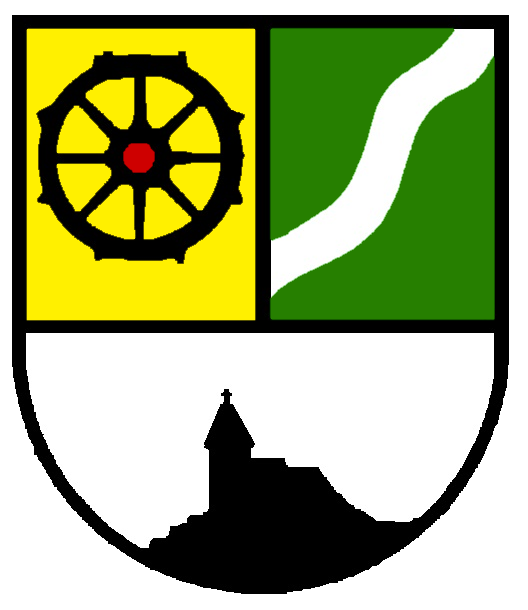
- Coat of arms

- Location of Gönnersdorf within Ahrweiler district
- Interactive map of Gönnersdorf
- Location within Germany Location within Rhineland-Palatinate
- Coordinates: 50°28′54″N 07°15′59″E
- Country: Germany
- State: Rhineland-Palatinate
- District: Ahrweiler
- Municipal assoc.: Bad Breisig

Government
  - Mayor (2019–24): Andreas Heuser

Area
  - Total: 5.04 km^{2} (1.95 sq mi)
- Elevation: 144 m (472 ft)

Population (2025-12-31)
  - Total: 639
  - Density: 127/km^{2} (328/sq mi)
- Time zone: UTC+01:00 (CET)
  - Summer (DST): UTC+02:00 (CEST)
- Postal codes: 53498
- Dialling codes: 02633
- Vehicle registration: AW
- Website: www.bad-breisig.de

Gönnersdorf (German pronunciation: [ˈɡœnɐsdɔʁf]) is a municipality in the district of Ahrweiler, in Rhineland-Palatinate, Germany.
