= Haavard Langseth =

Norwegian Communist Party activist (1888–1968)

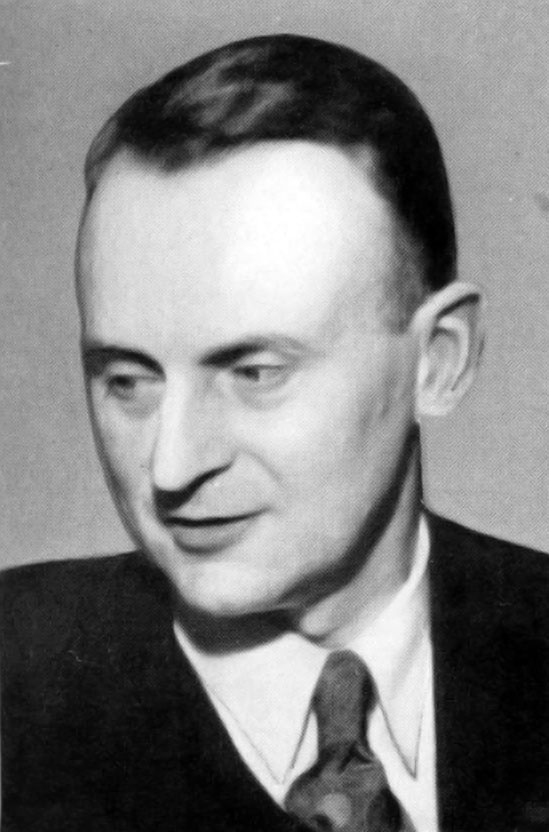
Haavard Langseth, 1939

Haavard Ulvin Langseth (7 July 1888 – 12 April 1968) was a political activist in the Communist Party of Norway.

Langseth went to Moscow as a delegate to the 2nd World Congress of the Comintern in 1920 and was appointed to the Provisional International Bureau of Kultintern at an ancillary conference held a few days later.

In 1952 Langseth was involved in the launch of Orientering, edited by Jakob Friis in 1952. However he was forced to withdraw following a large meeting in January 1953, when a large majority of those present wanted the magazine to adopt an equally critical attitude to the Soviet Union.
