= Domingo García, Segovia =

Domingo García
- Municipality
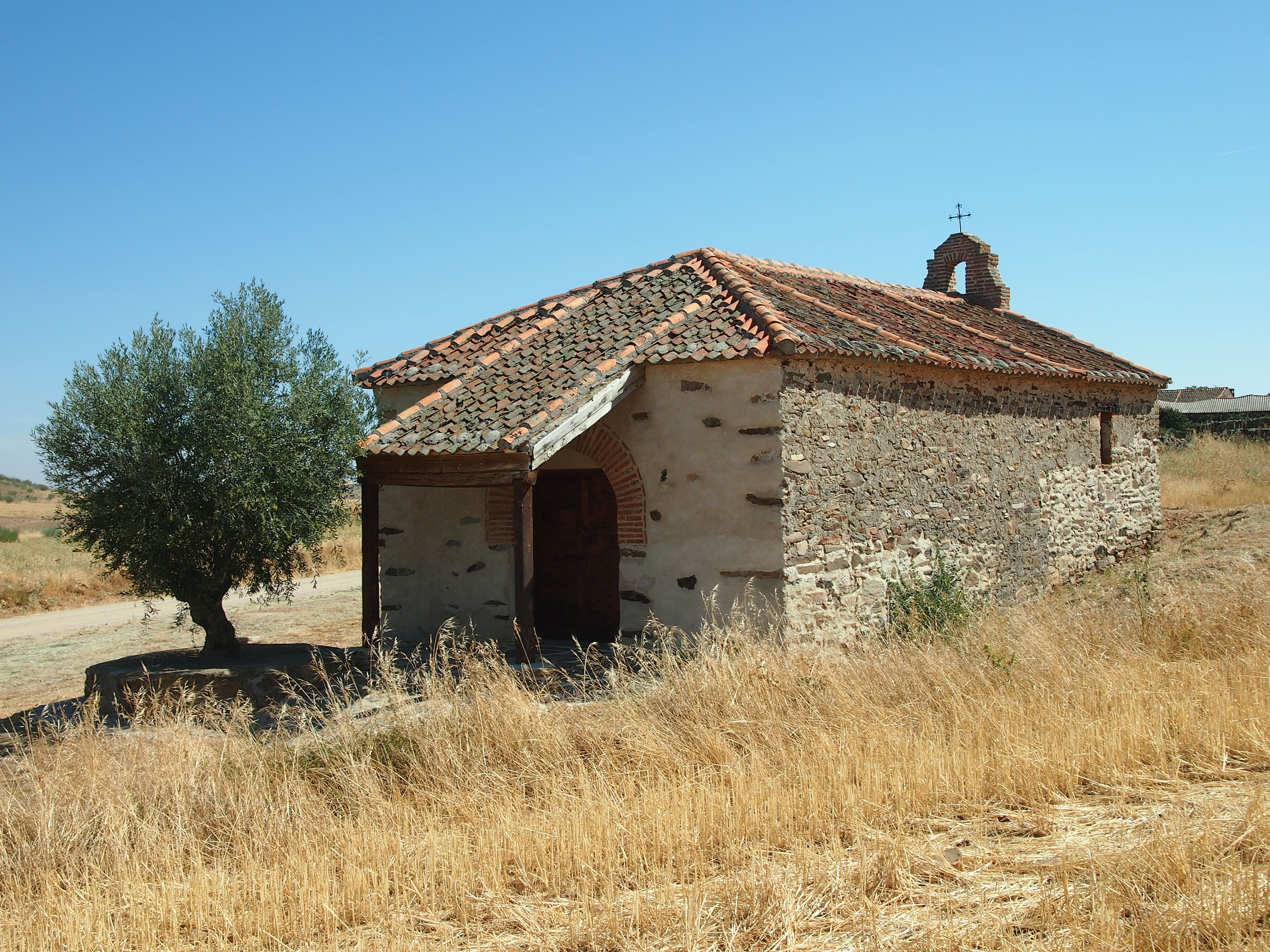
- Hermitage of Santo Cristo in Domingo García, Segovia (Spain)

- Location in Spain. Domingo García (Spain)
- Coordinates: 41°06′56″N 4°22′44″W
- Country: Spain
- Autonomous community: Castile and León
- Province: Segovia
- Municipality: Domingo García

Area
  - Total: 17 km^{2} (6.6 sq mi)
- Elevation: 903 m (2,963 ft)

Population (2025-01-01)
  - Total: 29
  - Density: 1.7/km^{2} (4.4/sq mi)
- Time zone: UTC+1 (CET)
  - Summer (DST): UTC+2 (CEST)
- Website: Official website

Domingo García is a municipality located in the province of Segovia, Castile and León, Spain. According to the 2004 census (INE), the municipality has a population of 50 inhabitants, being a very small municipality. It has a lot of old houses and an old church.
