= Schalkenbach =

- Municipality
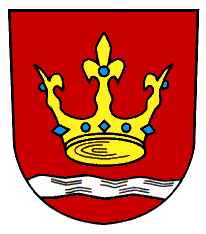
- Coat of arms

- Location of Schalkenbach within Ahrweiler district
- Interactive map of Schalkenbach
- Location within Germany Location within Rhineland-Palatinate
- Coordinates: 50°29′38″N 7°8′56″E
- Country: Germany
- State: Rhineland-Palatinate
- District: Ahrweiler
- Municipal assoc.: Brohltal
- Subdivisions: 3

Government
  - Mayor (2019–24): Thomas Weber

Area
  - Total: 10.28 km^{2} (3.97 sq mi)
- Elevation: 278 m (912 ft)

Population (2025-12-31)
  - Total: 794
  - Density: 77.2/km^{2} (200/sq mi)
- Time zone: UTC+01:00 (CET)
  - Summer (DST): UTC+02:00 (CEST)
- Postal codes: 53426
- Dialling codes: 02646
- Vehicle registration: AW

Schalkenbach is a municipality in the district of Ahrweiler, in Rhineland-Palatinate, Germany.
