= Max Barthel =

German writer

Max Barthel (born 17 November 1893 in Loschwitz, Dresden – died 17 June 1975 in Waldbröl) was a German writer.

A factory worker, Barthel was a member of the socialist youth movement; he was a World War I frontline soldier from 1914 to 1918.

== Trip to Russia ==
In 1920 he accepted a personal invitation from Karl Radek to travel to Moscow and attend the 2nd World Congress of the Comintern in 1920. He travelled as a stowaway to Estonia. Once here he mingled with Russian prisoners of war and thus was able to cross the border. Whilst in Russia, he also attended the International Conference of the Young Communist International and met Vladimir Lenin. He attended the Kultintern, where he joined the Provisional International Bureau.

In 1923 Barthel moved from the KPD (Communist Party of Germany) to the Social Democratic Party of Germany. He drew closer to Nazism after the seizure of power; he was a reporter on Strength Through Joy trips, and a press correspondent during the war. In 1922 he had worked Communist ideas into the poem "Arbeiterseele" (The Worker's Soul), but in 1934 his novel Das unsterbliche Volk (The Immortal Volk) described "the transformation of a German worker [himself] from a Communist to a follower of the Führer". In a tone of resignation, Barthel titled his postwar autobiography Kein Bedarf an Weltgeschichte (No Need for World History; 1950).

== Works ==
- Vom roten Moskau bis zum schwarzen Meer (From Red Moscow to the Black Sea, 1921) Berlin: Internationaler Jugendverlag
- Der Mensch am Kreuz. Roman nach dem Tagebuch eines katholischen Pfarrers (The Man on the Cross. A Novel based on the Diary of a Catholic Pastor, 1929) Berlin: Der Bücherkreis

== Bibliography ==
- Christian Zentner, Friedemann Bedürftig (1991). The Encyclopedia of the Third Reich. Macmillan, New York. ISBN 0-02-897502-2
