= Grotte de Gabillou =

Archaeological site in France

Coordinates: 45.0398°N 0.3807°E

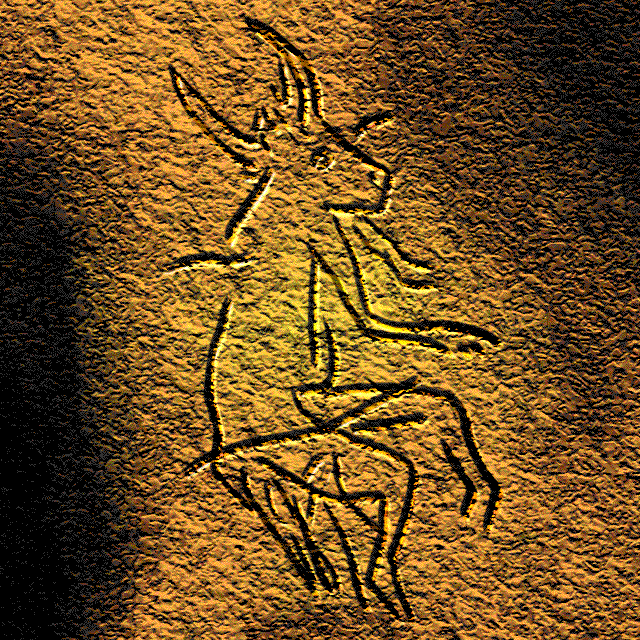
Artist's impression of "The Sorcerer" of Gabillou

The Grotte de Gabillou also known as Grotte de las Agnelas is a cave in France in which prehistoric ornaments stemming from the Paleolithic period exist. It is situated in the commune of Sourzac in the department of Dordogne, Nouvelle Aquitaine and is a private property. Its sediments are from the Maastrichtian era.

== History ==
The cave was discovered either in 1940 or in 1941 and subsequently its discovery was announced to the Historical and Archaeological Society of Perigord. It was classified as a historic monument on the 20 July 1942. In 1955, the property containing the cave was bought by Jean Gaussen, who in 1964 published a book about the ornaments in the cave which depict mostly animals but also some humans. Some of the caves artifacts were displayed during an exhibition in April 2017. The access in only possible through the basement below one room and research is restricted due to the fragile durability of the ornaments. As of 2015, only researchers with relevant qualifications are allowed to study the cave.

== Location and diameters ==
The cave is only accessible through the basement below a room and the entrance to it is not disclosed to the public. The cave is seated in the valley of the Isle river, in the commune of Sourzac, near Mussidan. The length of the cave is twenty-seven meters, with slim passages of between fifty and sixty cm wide. To the end, the cave widens and forms the "Room of the Red Horse".

== Engravings ==
It is assumed that some of the ornaments stem from the Magdalenian. The cave contains more than 200 ornaments, fifty-six horses, twenty-one reindeers, eighteen birds, twelve bisons, eight ibex and some bears and rabbits. The animals are mostly depicted as a whole and their proportions were observed; sometimes the animals are in movement, while others are seated. Other engravings depict humans like a woman giving birth. A remarkable example is the ornament known as The Sorcerer, which is described as a horned and bearded man-like figure with a foot and leg which resembles the one of a human. Stéphane Petrognani and Georges Sauvet have compared the engraved horses at the Grotte de Gabillou with the ones of the Cave de Lavaux. They also noted that the horses in Gabillou often display elaborate sensorial organs like eyes, ears, mouth and nose.

== Lamps ==
The cave also contains a series of lamps and spearheads.
