= Bad Breisig =

Municipality of Germany

- Town
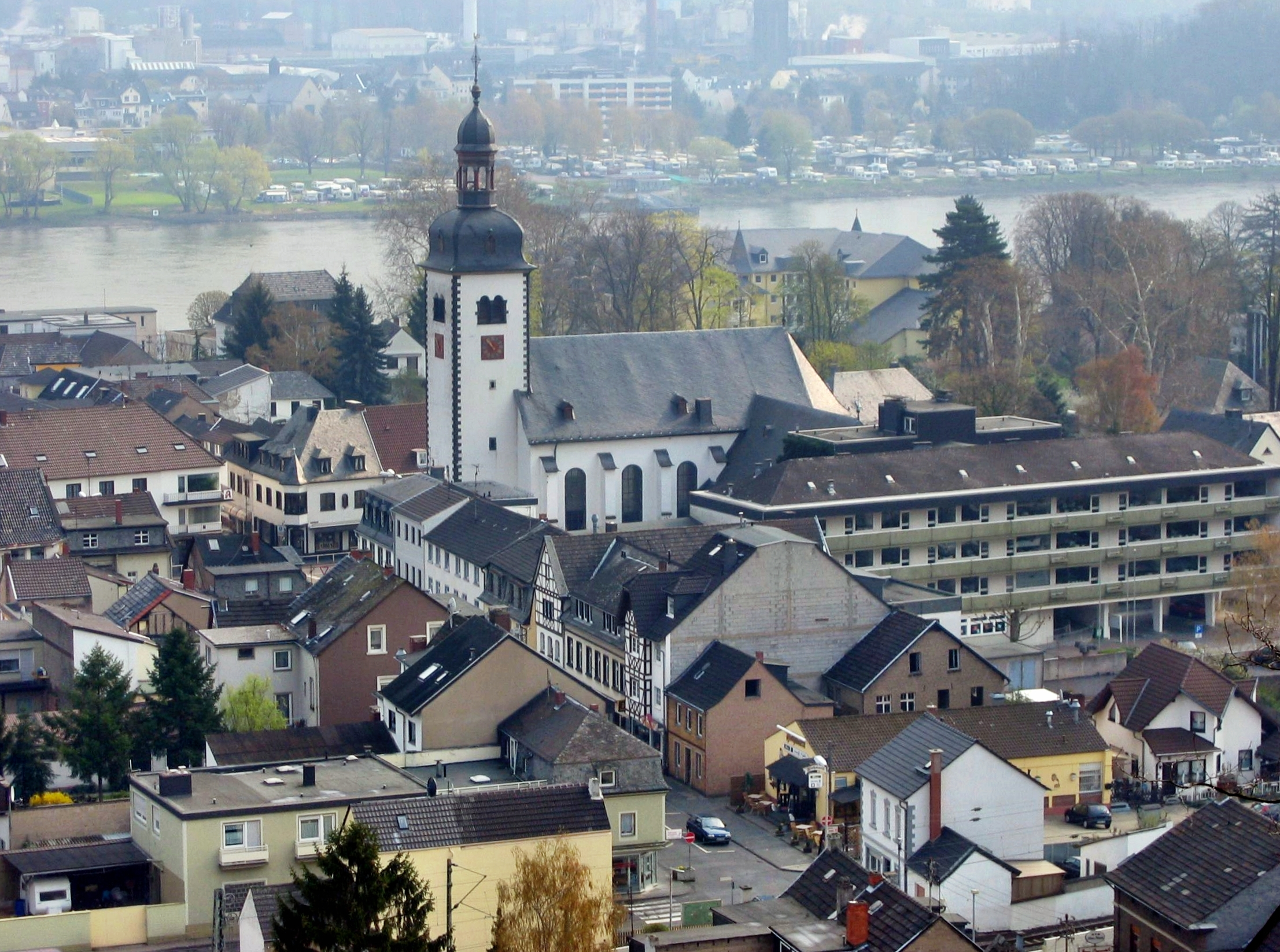
- View of Bad Breisig

- Coat of arms

- Location of Bad Breisig within Ahrweiler district
- Interactive map of Bad Breisig
- Location within Germany Location within Rhineland-Palatinate
- Coordinates: 50°30′33″N 7°17′47″E
- Country: Germany
- State: Rhineland-Palatinate
- District: Ahrweiler
- Municipal assoc.: Bad Breisig

Government
  - Mayor (2024–29): Marcel Caspers

Area
  - Total: 19.93 km^{2} (7.70 sq mi)
- Elevation: 70 m (230 ft)

Population (2025-12-31)
  - Total: 9,661
  - Density: 484.7/km^{2} (1,255/sq mi)
- Time zone: UTC+01:00 (CET)
  - Summer (DST): UTC+02:00 (CEST)
- Postal codes: 53498
- Dialling codes: 02633; 02642
- Vehicle registration: AW
- Website: www.bad-breisig.de

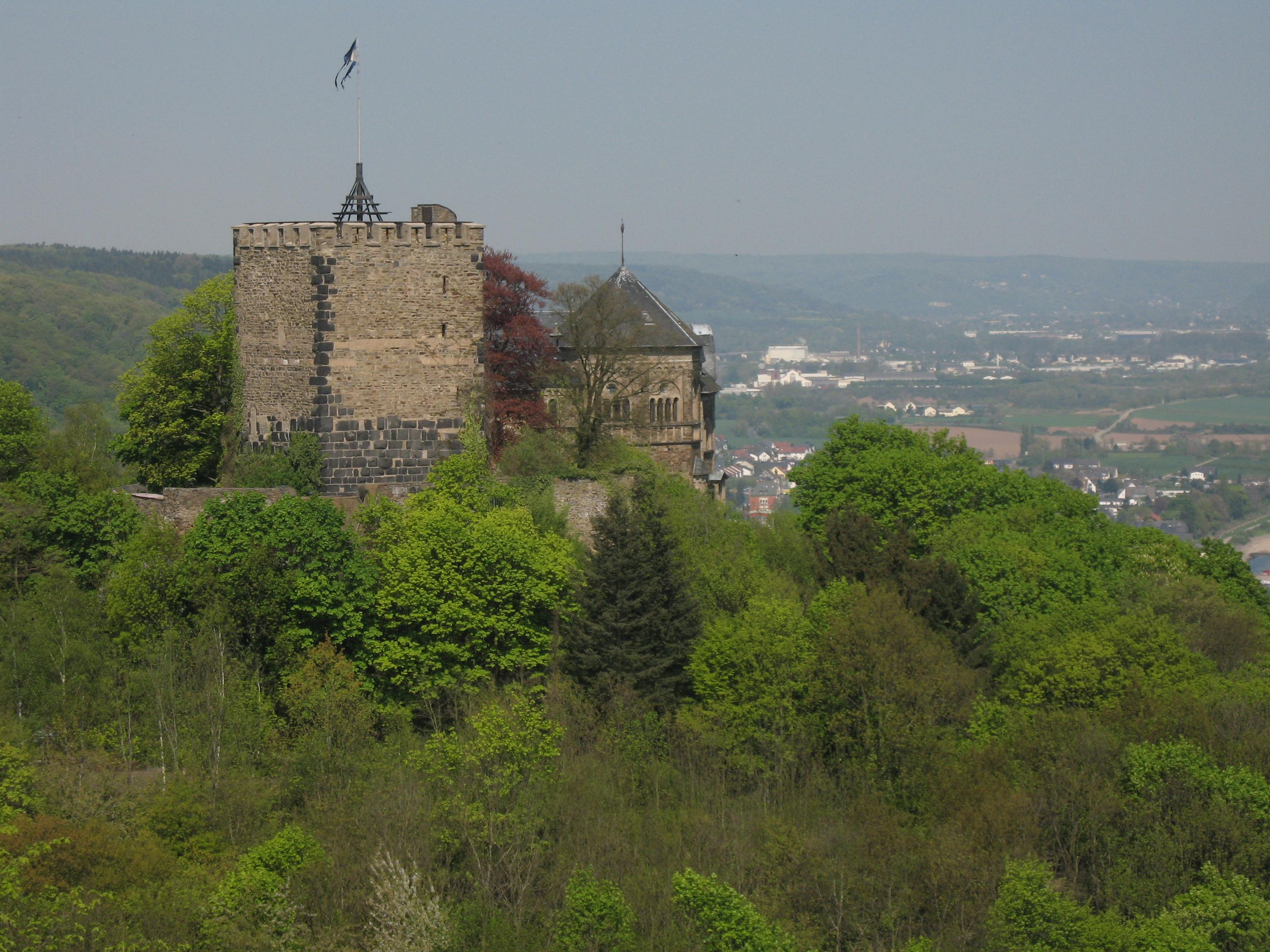
Rheineck Castle

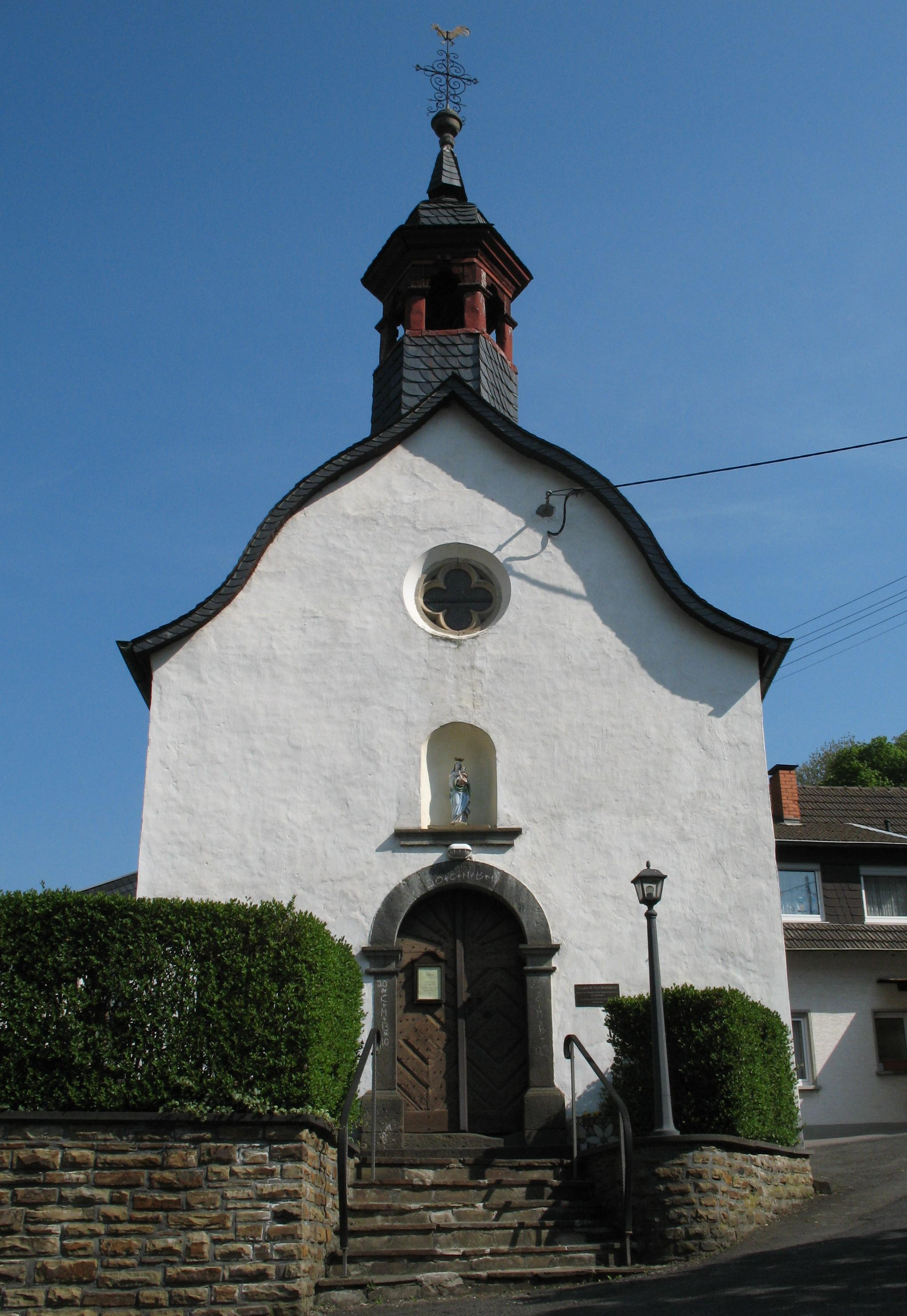
Saint Charles Borromeo chapel

Bad Breisig (German: [baːt ˈbʁaɪzɪç]) is a town in the district of Ahrweiler, in Rhineland-Palatinate, Germany. It is situated on the Rhine, approx. 15 km south-east of Bad Neuenahr-Ahrweiler.

Bad Breisig is the seat of the Verbandsgemeinde ("collective municipality") Bad Breisig.

== Personalities ==
=== Sons and daughters of the town ===
- Beate Berger (1886-1940), director of the Jewish children's home Beith Ahawah in Berlin and Haifa

=== People connected with Bad Breisig ===
- Max Barthel (1893-1975), working poet, lived from 1948 to 1969 in Bad Breisig
- Klaus Badelt (born 1967), a German composer, who specializes in television and soundtrack.
- Kai Krause (born 1957), a German musician and software - pioneer, lives in Rheineck Castle.
- The religious scholar and sociologist Oliver Krüger (born 1973) grew up in Bad Breisig.

== Transport ==
Bad Breisig station

Bad Breisig station is located at the Linke Rheinstrecke and served by lines RE5 (Koblenz Hbf - Wesel), RB26 (Mainz Hbf - Köln Messe/Deutz) and RB32 (Koblenz Hbf - Ahrbrück). Bad Breisig is located in the area of the transport association Verkehrsverbund Rhein-Mosel (VRM), fare zone number 808.

== See also ==
- Bad Breisig (Final Palaeolithic site)
