= Brohl-Lützing =

- Municipality
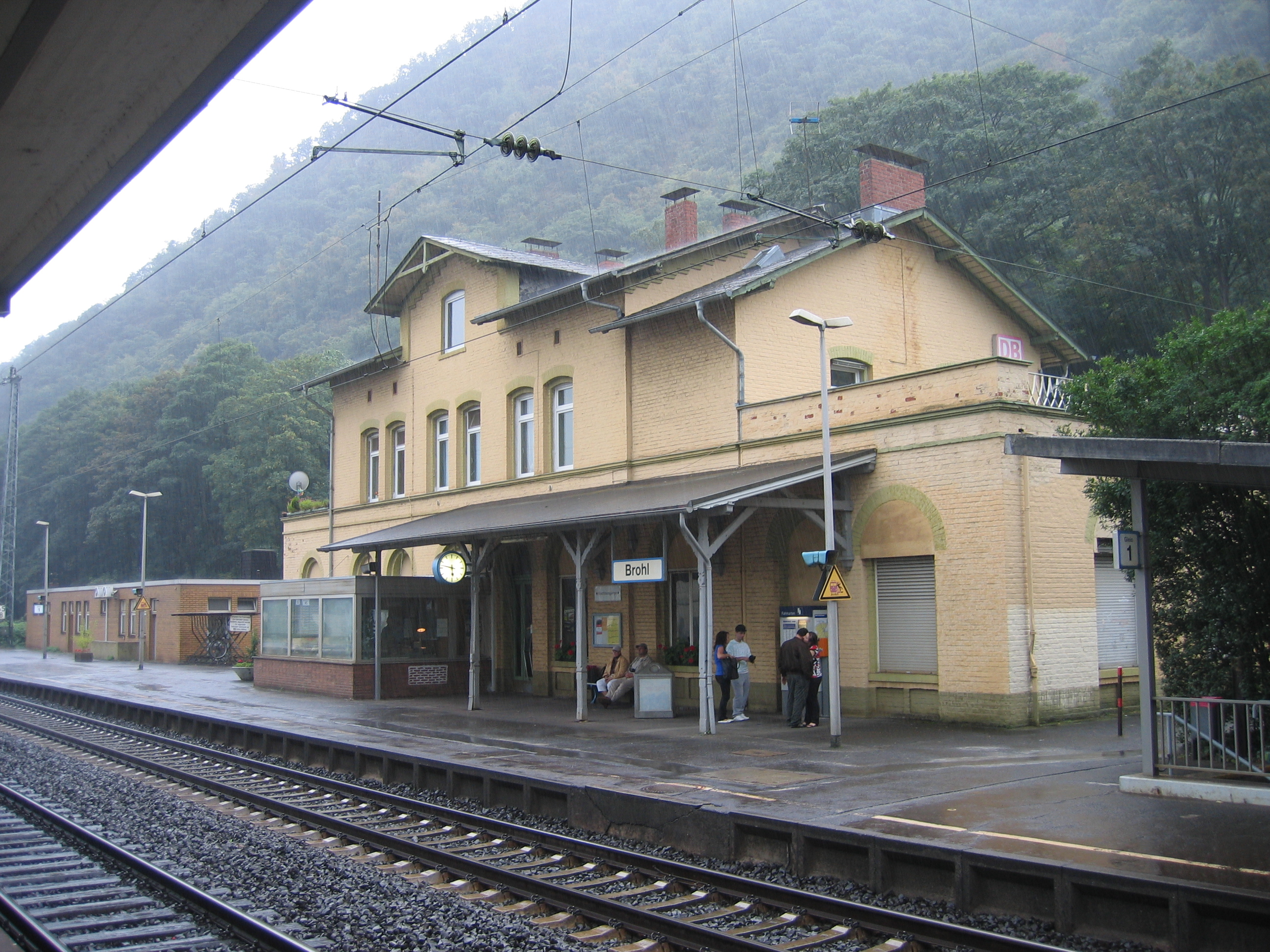
- Train station

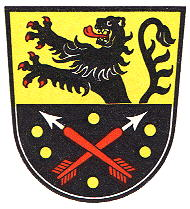
- Coat of arms

- Location of Brohl-Lützing within Ahrweiler district
- Interactive map of Brohl-Lützing
- Location within Germany Location within Rhineland-Palatinate
- Coordinates: 50°29′6″N 7°19′45″E
- Country: Germany
- State: Rhineland-Palatinate
- District: Ahrweiler
- Municipal assoc.: Bad Breisig

Government
  - Mayor (2024–29): Frank Gondert

Area
  - Total: 9.23 km^{2} (3.56 sq mi)
- Elevation: 70 m (230 ft)

Population (2025-12-31)
  - Total: 2,526
  - Density: 274/km^{2} (709/sq mi)
- Time zone: UTC+01:00 (CET)
  - Summer (DST): UTC+02:00 (CEST)
- Postal codes: 56656
- Dialling codes: 02633 (Brohl), 02636 (Niederlützingen)
- Vehicle registration: AW

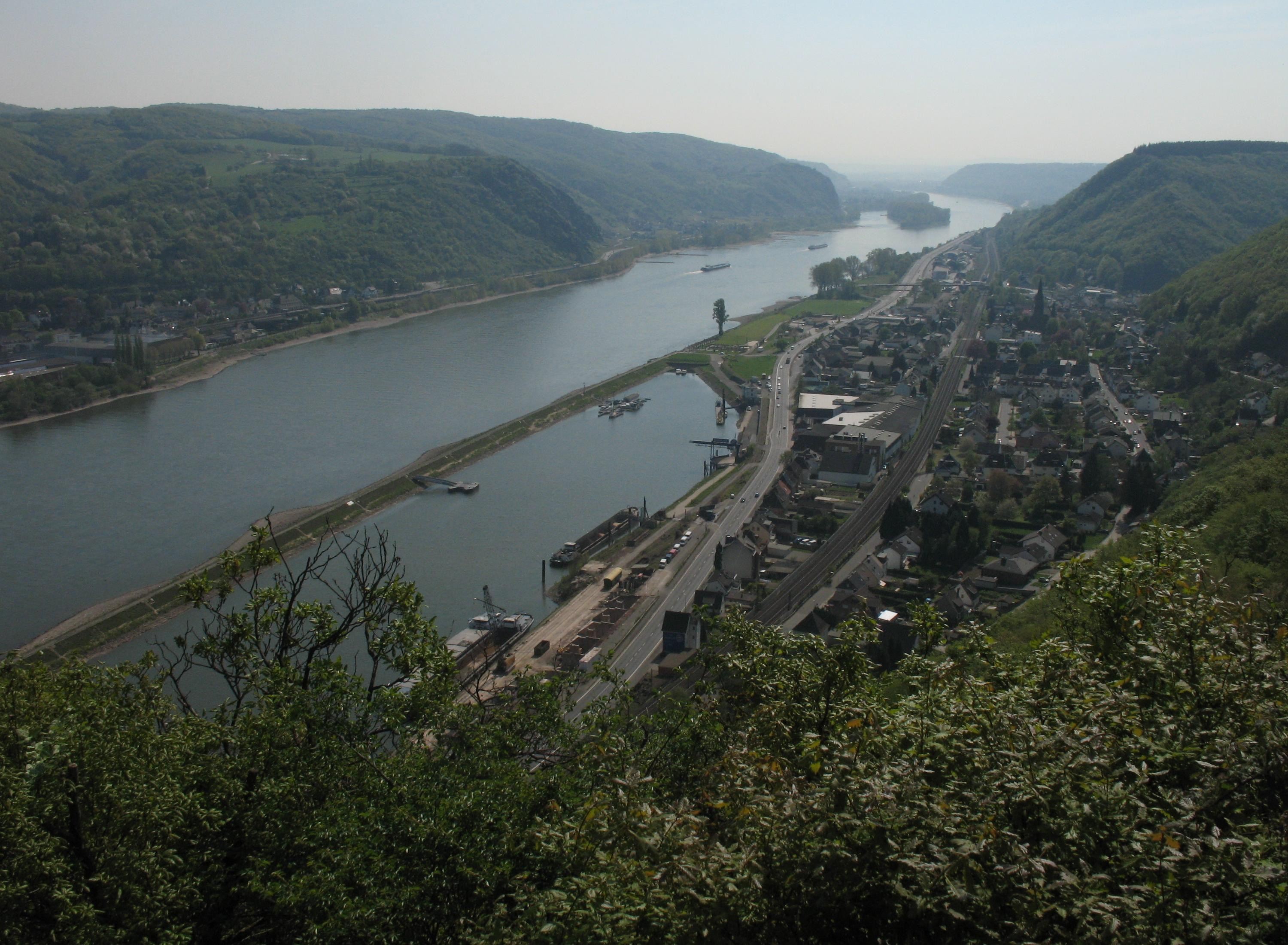
Brohl-Lützing

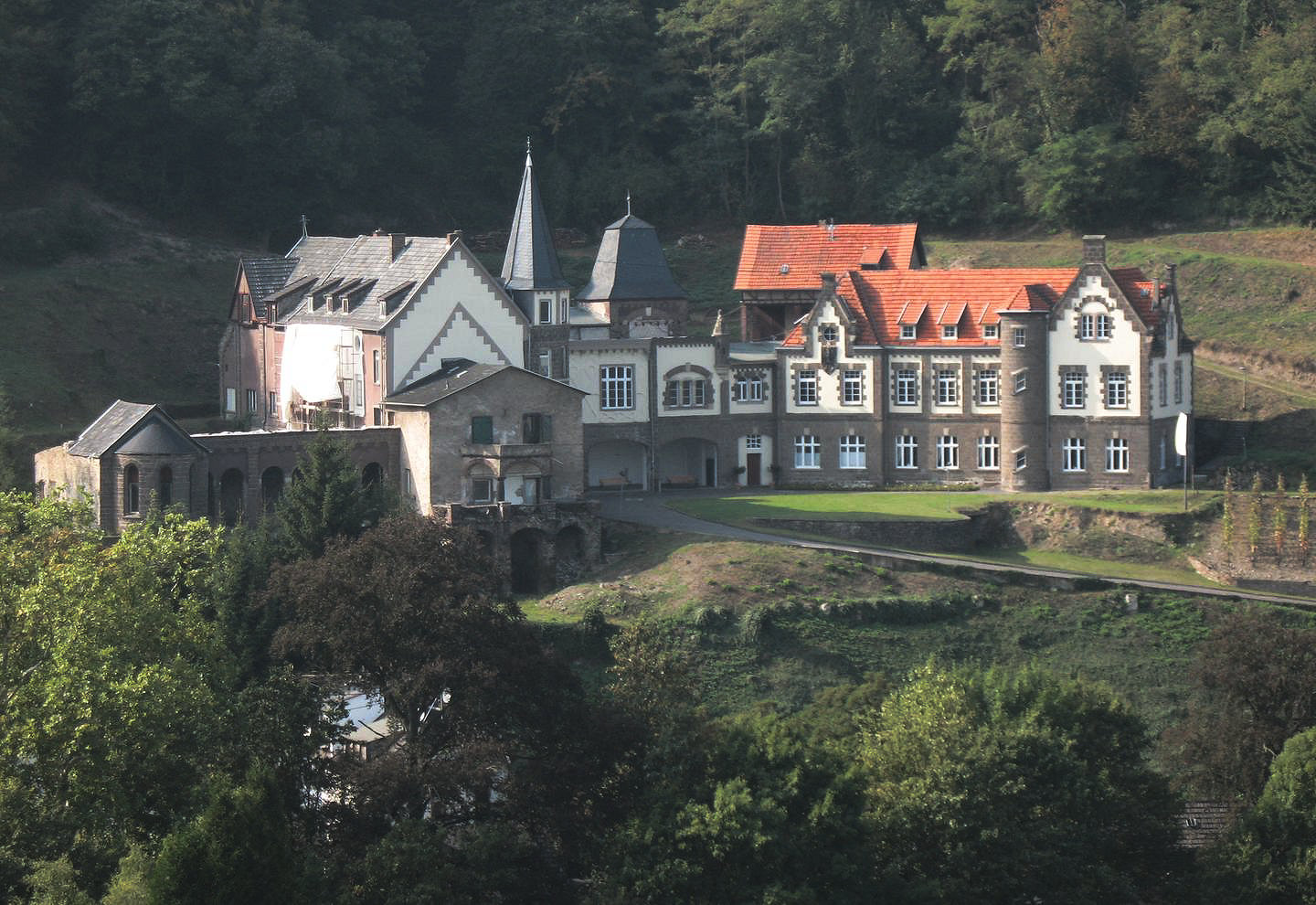
Castle „Augustaburg“

Brohl-Lützing is a municipality in the district of Ahrweiler in Rhineland-Palatinate, Germany. It is situated on the Rhine, approx. 20 km south-east of Bad Neuenahr-Ahrweiler, and belongs to the collective municipality Verbandsgemeinde Bad Breisig.

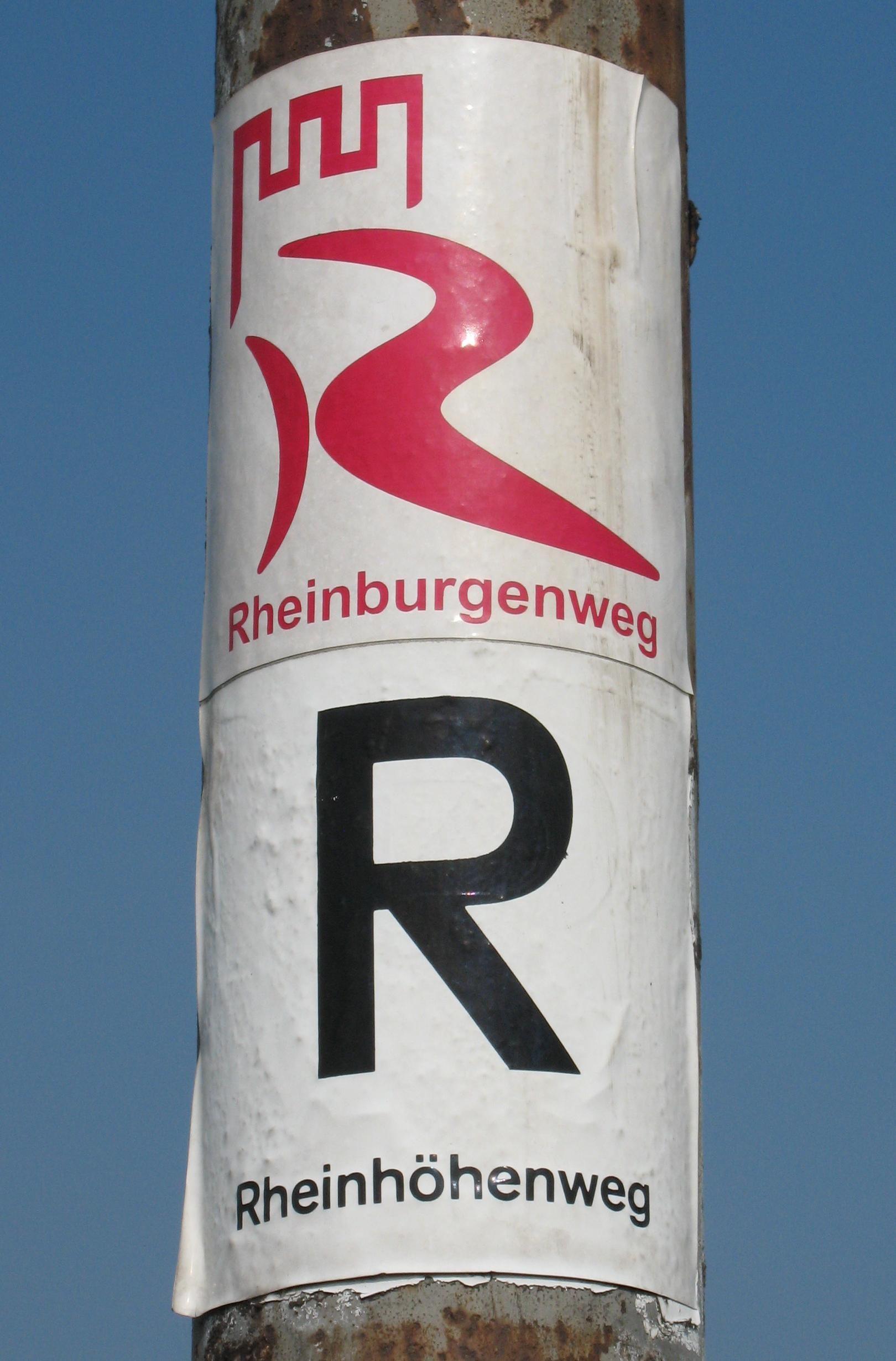
Rheinburgenweg Trail and Rheinhöhenweg Trail

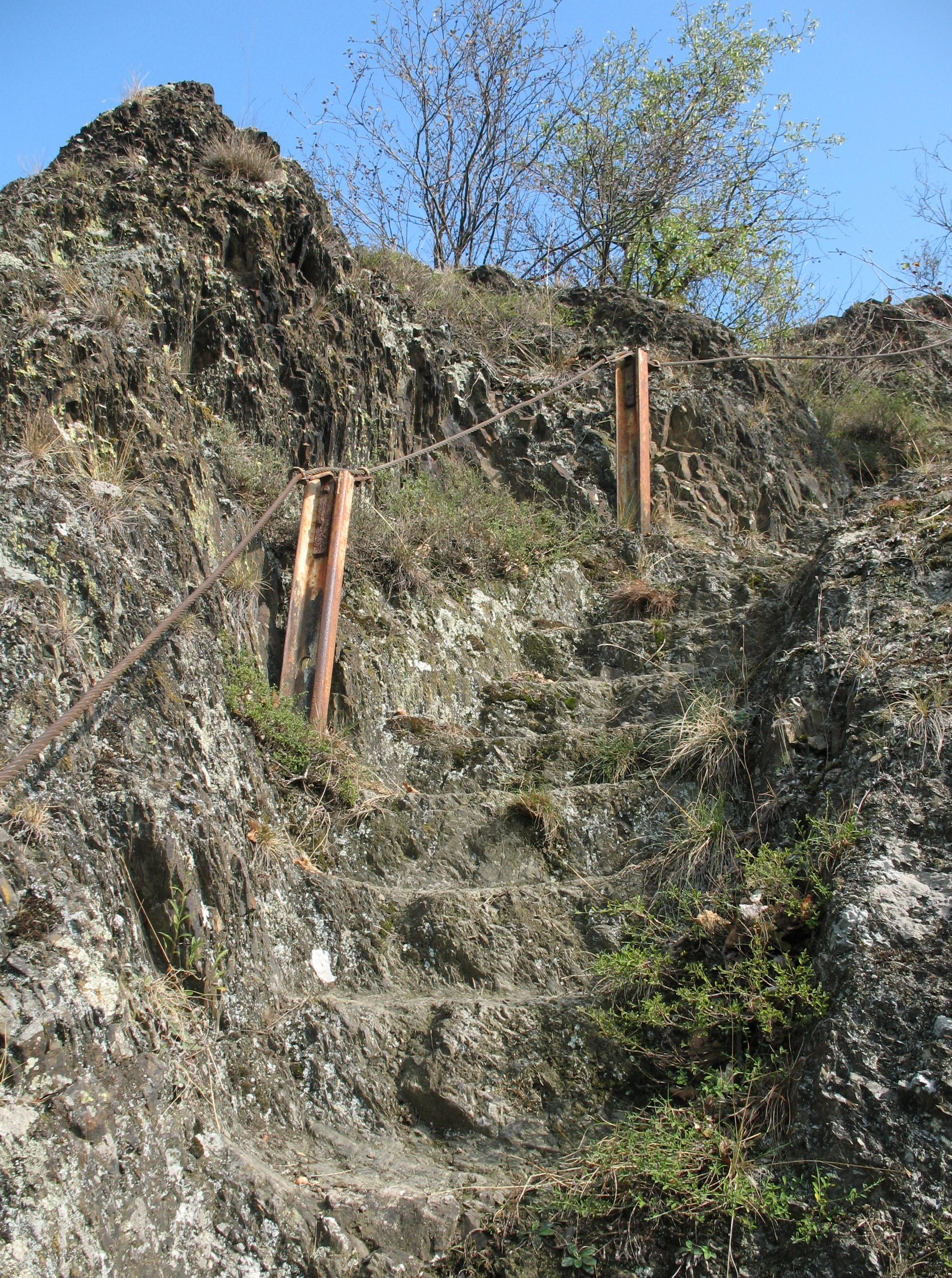
Hiking trail „Eselstreppe“

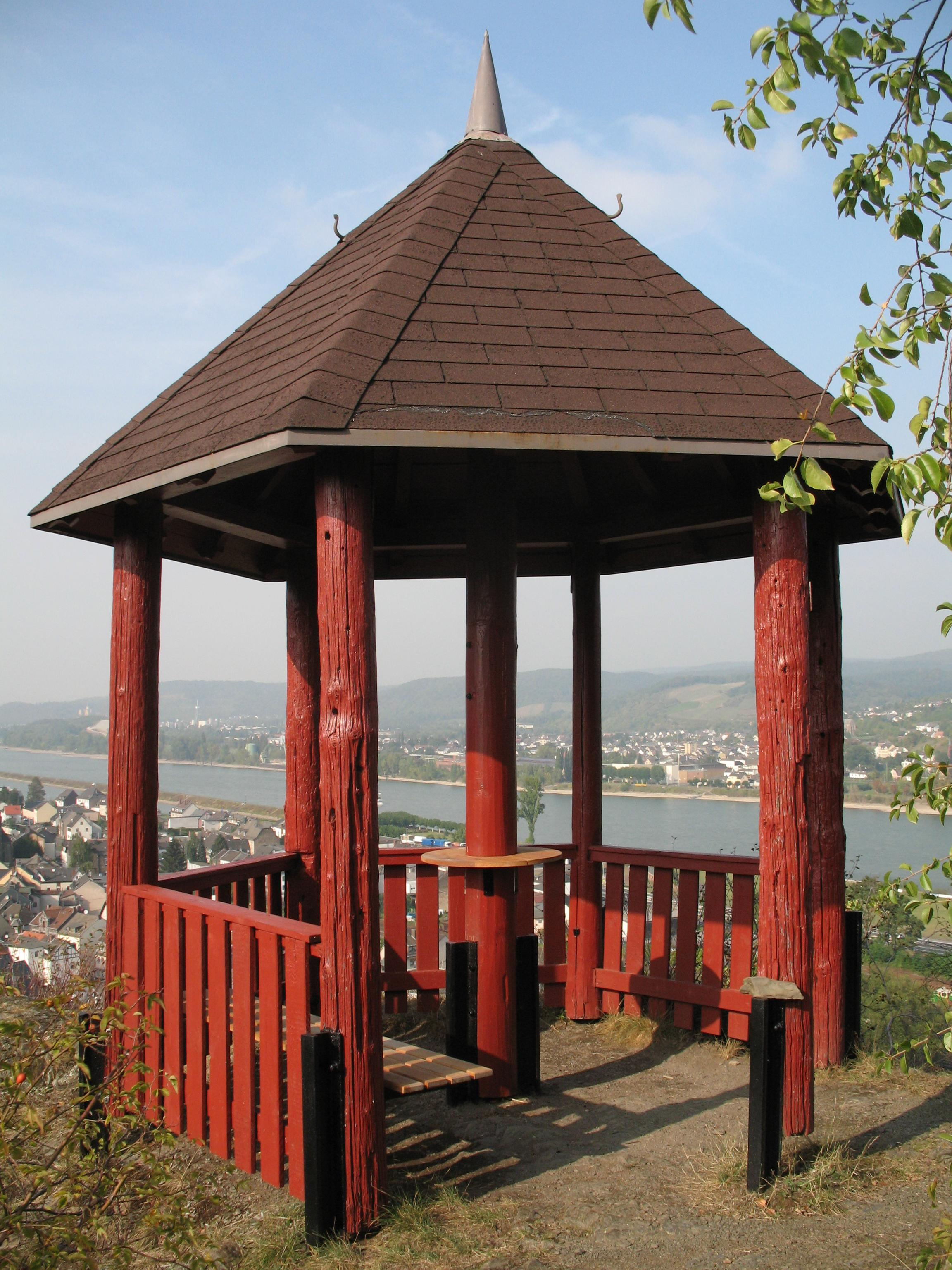
Viewpoint
