= Wilhelm Herzog =

German publisher, historian, dramatist, encyclopedist and pacifist

Wilhelm Herzog (12 January 1884 in Berlin – 4 April 1960 in Munich), alias Julian Sorel, René Kestner and Junius III, was a German publisher, historian of literature and culture, dramatist, encyclopedist, and pacifist.

== Life ==
He studied economics, Germanistics and history of art in Berlin. After publishing works about Lichtenstein (1905) and Heinrich von Kleist (1907), he revived with Paul Cassirer the literary magazine Pan in 1910/1911 and became its editor. From 1914 until its closure by the German authorities in 1915 and from 1918 to 1929 he wrote for the Das Forum, a journal advocating global peace and campaigning for a party of intellectuals.

As the secretary and right-hand man of Kurt Eisner, Herzog authored the official proclamation of the People's State of Bavaria on 8 November 1918. He published the daily newspaper Die Republik from 1918 to 1919. He joined the Independent Social Democratic Party (USPD), with the left wing of which he entered the Communist Party of Germany (KPD) at the end of 1920. Due to a conflict with top KPD official Willi Münzenberg, he was expelled from the KPD in 1928.

Between 1929 and 1933, he wrote Die Affäre Dreyfus (The Dreyfus Affair), Der Kampf einer Republik, and Panama. Die Affäre Dreyfus was adapted to English as the 1931 film Dreyfus and as a play by the theatre critic James Agate, having a short run in London as "I Accuse!", in 1937.

He emigrated to Switzerland in 1933 and to southern France in 1939. He was interned in the Camp des Milles until 1941 when he escaped to Trinidad. He was allowed to enter the United States in 1945. In 1947, his work From Dreyfus to Petain: The Struggle of a Republic was copyrighted.

In 1952, he won his lawsuit against the editor-in-chief of Der Schweizerische Beobachter, Hermann Schneider, and the director of Büchergilde Gutenberg, Hans Oprecht, who had alleged that he had enriched himself out of delaying the publication of Romain Rolland's two works by some 10 years and selling the rights to them to another publisher. He left Switzerland and moved permanently to Munich in the same year.

His main work was a 4-volume encyclopedia, Große Gestalten der Geschichte (Great Figures of History), conceived in the tradition of Diderot's Encyclopédie. In his autobiography, published in 1959, he included accounts of his meetings with Vladimir Lenin (to whom he attributed an admiration for Ignatius of Loyola), Thomas Mann, Rainer Maria Rilke, Bertrand Russell, Albert Schweitzer, Joseph Stalin and Leon Trotsky.

== Personal life ==
From 1915 to 1921 he was married to German film actress Erna Morena (1885–1962) and had one daughter with her.

== Works ==
- Rund um den Staatsanwalt (1923)
- Die Affäre Dreyfus (1928, 1929)
- Der Kampf einer Republik (1933)
- Panama (1931, changed in 1950)
- Hymnen und Pamphlete (1939)
- Kritische Enzyklopädie (1949)
- Menschen, denen ich begegnete (1959)
