= Altenahr =

- Municipality
- Coat of arms

- Location of Altenahr within Ahrweiler district
- Interactive map of Altenahr
- Location within Germany Location within Rhineland-Palatinate
- Coordinates: 50°31′03″N 06°59′19″E
- Country: Germany
- State: Rhineland-Palatinate
- District: Ahrweiler
- Municipal assoc.: Altenahr
- Subdivisions: 4

Government
  - Mayor (2019–24): Rüdiger Fuhrmann (CDU)

Area
  - Total: 14.84 km^{2} (5.73 sq mi)
- Elevation: 170 m (560 ft)

Population (2025-12-31)
  - Total: 1,635
  - Density: 110.2/km^{2} (285.4/sq mi)
- Time zone: UTC+01:00 (CET)
  - Summer (DST): UTC+02:00 (CEST)
- Postal codes: 53502–53505
- Dialling codes: 02643
- Vehicle registration: AW
- Website: www.altenahr-ahr.de

Altenahr (German: [ˈaltn̩.ʔaːɐ̯]) is a municipality in the district of Ahrweiler, in Rhineland-Palatinate, Germany. It is the administrative centre for the eponymous collective municipality, to which it belongs. Altenahr is a state-recognised tourist resort and is ranked as a Grundzentrum for state planning purposes.

== Geography ==
=== Location ===
Altenahr is situated on the river Ahr, on the northeastern edge of the Ahr Hills. part of the Eifel mountains, approximately 10 kilometres west of Bad Neuenahr-Ahrweiler and about 35 kilometres southwest of Bonn.

=== Administrative organisation ===
The municipality of Altenahr comprises the following parishes: Altenahr, Altenburg, Kreuzberg and Reimerzhoven.

=== Neighbouring municipalities ===
Altenahr borders on the following neighbouring municipalities, listed clockwise from the north: Kalenborn, Grafschaft, Mayschoß, Ahrbrück, Lind and Berg.

=== Climate ===
The annual precipitation is 668 mm which is in the middle third of readings collected for Germany as a whole. 34% of weather stations of the German Meteorological Service record lower values. The driest month is February, the greatest amount of rain falls in July; 1.6 times that of February. However, in general the level of precipitation varies little and is evenly distributed over the year. Only 13% of weather stations record lower seasonal variations.

The town was almost entirely submerged during the 2021 European floods.

== History ==
Altenahr was first mentioned in 893 in the Prüm Urbar.

=== Incorporations ===
On 7 June 1969 the hitherto independent municipality of Kreuzberg, with its 560 inhabitants, was incorporated into Altenahr.

=== Population growth ===
The growth in Altenahr's population related to the present-day municipal area; the values from 1871 to 1987 are based on censuses:

Year	Population
1815	893
1835	1,066
1871	1,140
1905	1,305
1939	1,737
1950	1,915

Year	Population
1961	2,032
1970	2,101
1987	1,758
1997	1,774
2005	1,668
2025	1635

== Gallery ==
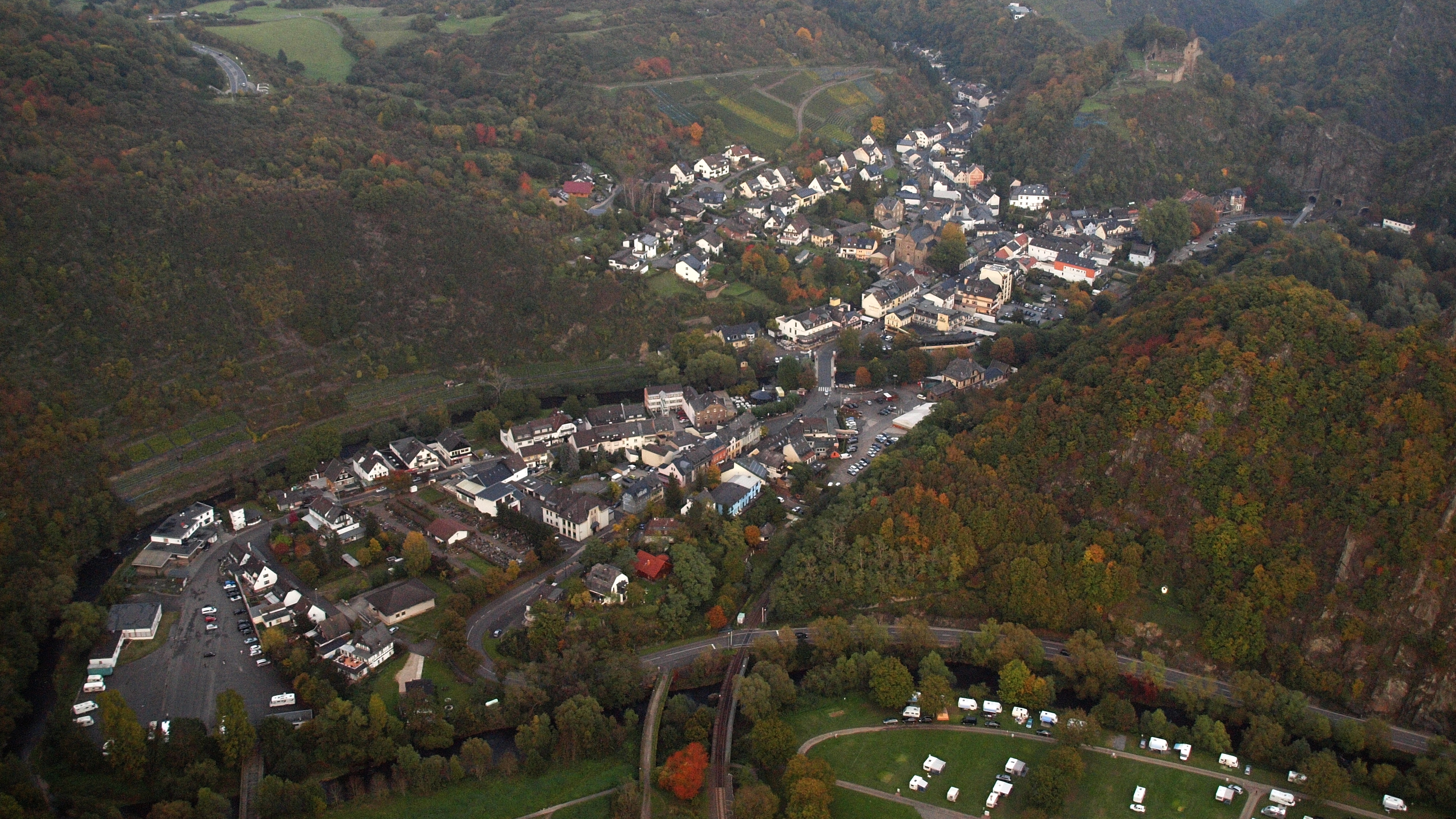
Altenahr, aerial photograph, 2015

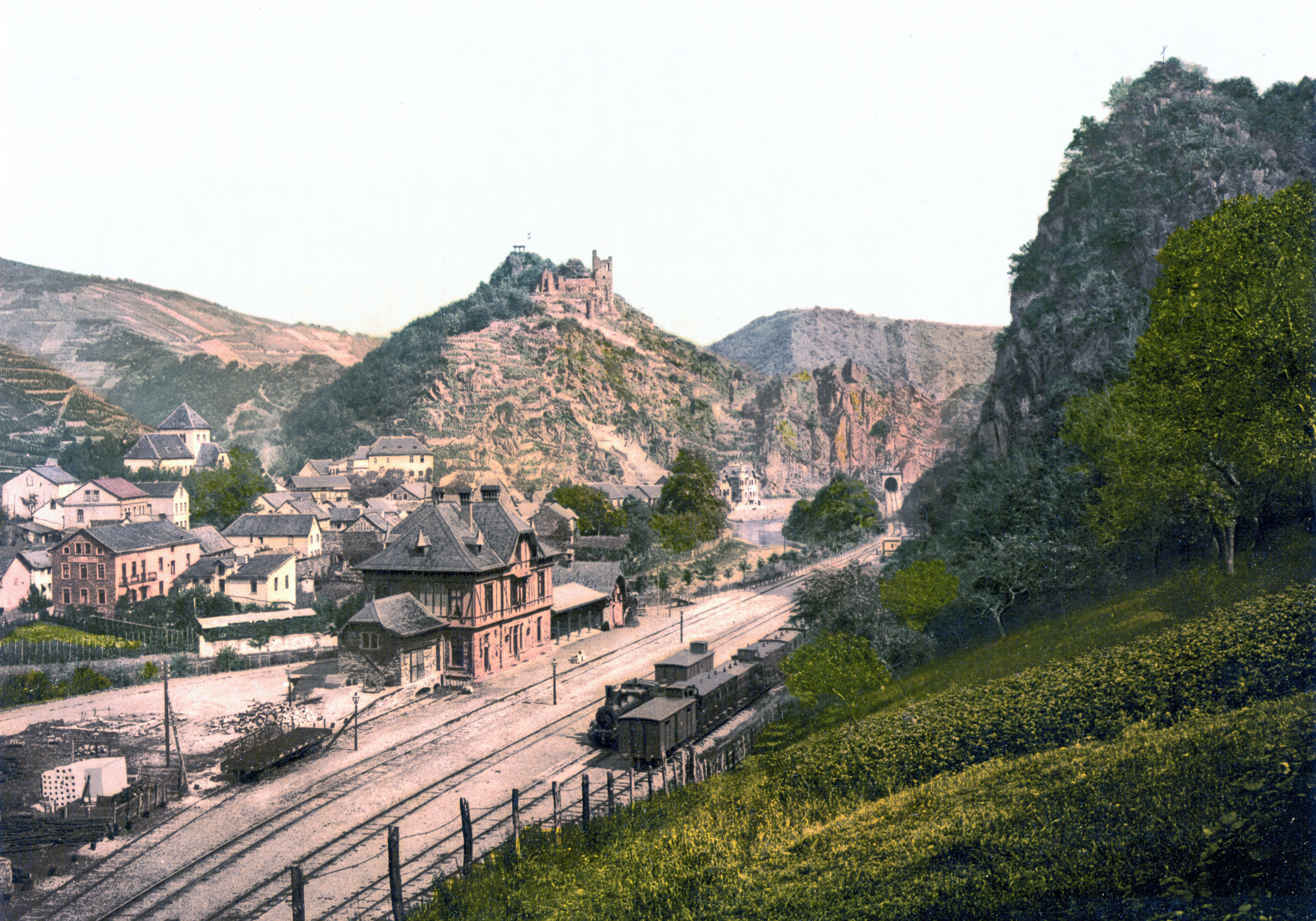
Photograph of Altenahr in about 1900
