= Odenbach (disambiguation) =

Odenbach is a village in the county of Kusel, Rhineland-Palatinate.

Odenbach may also refer to:

== Places in Germany ==
=== Municipalities ===
- Schallodenbach, village in the county of Kaiserslautern, Rhineland-Palatinate

=== Rivers and streams ===
- Odenbach (Brettach), right hand tributary of the Brettach before the Vorder Mill, Mainhardt, Schwäbisch Hall, Baden-Württemberg
- Odenbach (Buchholzbach), left hand upper reaches of the Buchholzbach between the mills of Ellesheimer and Buchholzbacher Mühle, Bad Münstereifel, Euskirchen, North Rhine-Westphalia (empties into the Armuthsbach)
- Odenbach (Glan), right hand tributary of the Glan near Odenbach, county of Kusel, Rhineland-Palatinate
- Odenbach (Lampertsbach), left hand upper reaches of the Lampertsbach (Ahr) as far as Alendorf, Blankenheim, Euskirchen, North Rhine-Westphalia
- Odenbach (Rur), right hand tributary of the Rur in Blens, Heimbach, Düren, North Rhine-Westphalia
- Odenbach (Schauerbach), right hand tributary of the Schauerbach before the Weihermühle Mill, Herschberg, Südwestpfalz, Rhineland-Palatinate

=== Buildings ===
- Odenbach Castle, ruin of a water castle in Odenbach, Kusel, Rhineland-Palatinate
- Odenbach Synagogue, historic country synagogue in Odenbach, Kusel, Rhineland-Palatinate

== People ==
- Friedrich Odenbach (born 1945), German politician (SPD)
- Marcel Odenbach (born 1953), German video artist
- Paul Erwin Odenbach (1924–2007), German psychiatrist and medical politician

== See also ==
- Ödenbach (disambiguation)
- Oderbach, a river of Hesse, Germany
