= Nonnenbach =

Nonnenbach may refer to:

- Nonnenbach (Ahr), a river of North Rhine-Westphalia, Germany, tributary of the Ahr
- Nonnenbach (Aschaff), a river of Bavaria, Germany, tributary of the Aschaff
- Nonnenbach (Bodensee), a river of Baden-Württemberg and Bavaria, Germany, tributary of Lake Constance
- Nonne (river), also called Nonnenbach, a river of Mecklenburg-Vorpommern, Germany, tributary of the Tollensesee
