= Ahrgau =

Medieval region along the River Ahr

The Ahrgau (also Argau) was an early-medieval Frankish Gau (region) along the lower River Ahr in the north of the present-day German state of Rhineland-Palatinate. It extended towards Bonn, including the Kottenforst forest. In the medieval Rhineland, Gau names were used to locate settlements; although associated with the jurisdictions of counts, these regions were not equivalent to the territorial lordships of the later Middle Ages.

The Ahrgau is mentioned in the records under various names including Arisco (880), pagus Aroensis (882), Argowe (1064) and Archgouwe (1065).

== Territory ==
The Ahrgau belonged to Ripuaria in Lower Lorraine and to the diocese of the Archbishopric of Cologne, which had an Ahr deanery (Ahrdekanat or Decanatus Areuensis) named after it.

The geographical reconstruction in the 1865 Mittelrheinisches Urkundenbuch treated the Ahrgau and Bonngau together. It placed the southern boundary with the Mayenfeldgau on the line from Rheineck up the Vinxtbach stream to the Hohe Acht; the western boundary with the Eifelgau and Zülpichgau along the Adenaubach stream as far as the Ahr, along the Vischbach, the Sürsch and the Swist; and the northern boundary with the Kölngau. In the east, the Rhine separated the area from the Auelgau.

== History ==
Following Ulrich Nonn, Manfred Groten identifies one of the five Ripuarian counties mentioned in the Treaty of Meerssen of 870 as the county in the Bonngau or Ahrgau. Count Sikko exercised comital authority in both the Bonngau and Ahrgau in the mid-eleventh century.

The later counts of Are had their family seat at Are Castle in Altenahr. Their possessions included estates in the Ahr and Erft regions, as well as Heerlen and Steinfeld; the family's prominence dates especially from the twelfth century.

== Counts in the Ahrgau ==
Counts documented as exercising comital authority in the Ahrgau include:

- Sicco (Sikko), attested in the Ahrgau in 1051 and 1064, and in the Bonngau in 1047.
- Bertold (also Pertold or Bertoldus), attested in 1065.

Dieter Siebert-Gasper regards Bertold as Sikko's successor and considers Sikko to have died shortly after 1064.

Older literature associated Sigbod or Sybodo, traditionally dated to 930, with the foundation of Steinfeld Abbey and the ancestry of the Counts of Are. Friedrich Wilhelm Oediger instead proposed that the foundation took place between 1069 and 1073.

In a genealogical reconstruction published in 1954, Werner Bornheim proposed that a younger Sicco, whom he dated to about 1073–1075, was the father of Dietrich I of Are. Bornheim dated this Sicco's appearance as a witness for Deutz Abbey to that period; Siebert-Gasper dates Sicco's witnessing of the Kessenich donation to Deutz to 1056–1065.

== Literature ==
- Thomas Bauer, Die mittelalterlichen Gaue, Geschichtlicher Atlas der Rheinlande, IV.9, Cologne: Rheinland-Verlag, 2000. Map and 89-page accompanying booklet. ISBN 3-7927-1818-9.
