= Häuschen =

Hill in Germany

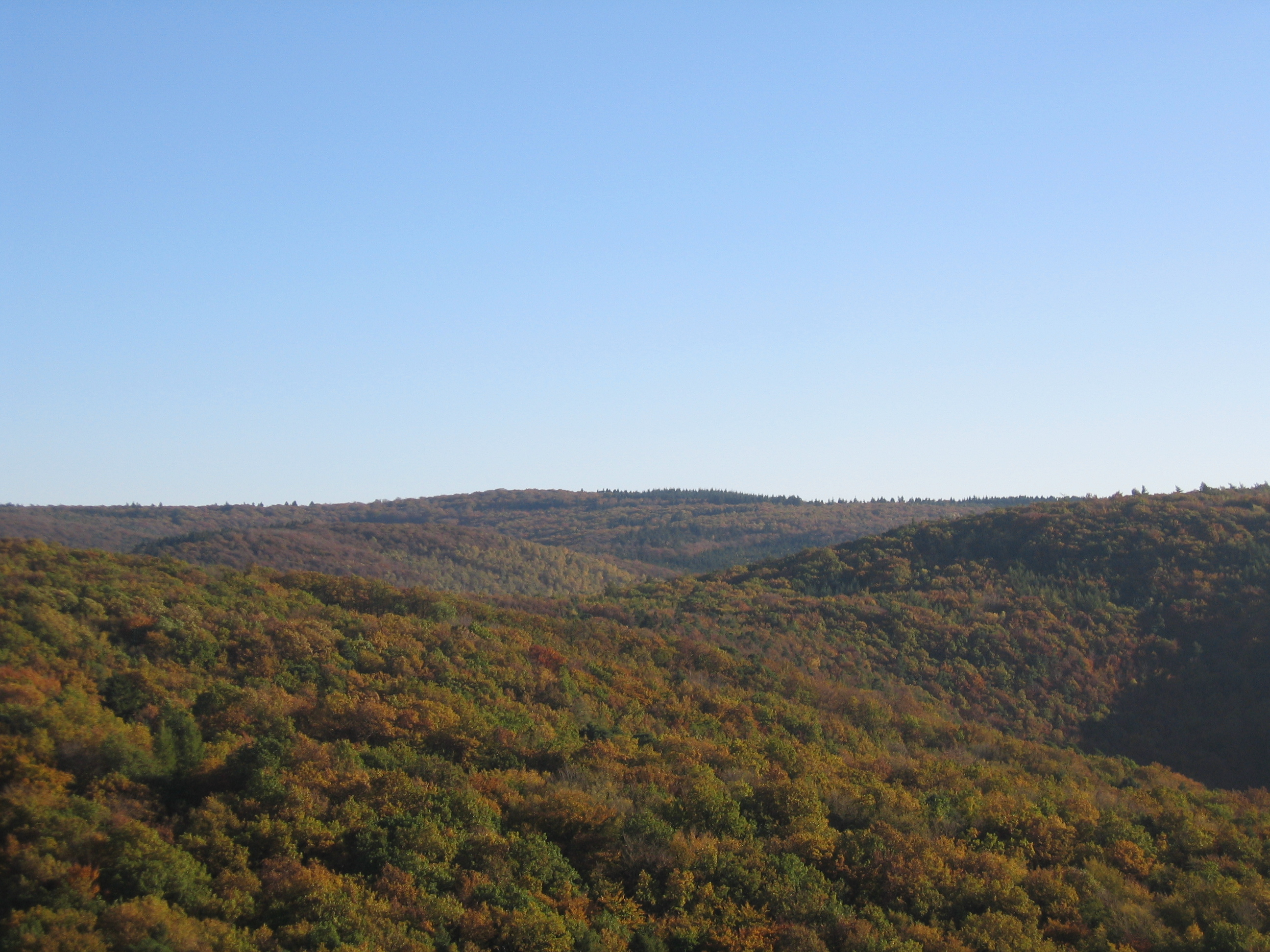
- View from the Alfred Dahm Tower looking SSE towards the Häuschen

Highest point
- Elevation: 506.5 m above sea level (NHN) (1,662 ft)
- Coordinates: 50°30′15″N 7°4′25″E

Geography
- Location within Rhineland-Palatinate
- Location: near Ahrweiler; county of Ahrweiler, Rhineland-Palatinate, Germany
- Parent range: Eifel

The Häuschen is a hill, 506.5 m above sea level (NHN), in the Eifel mountains. It rises near Ahrweiler in the county of Ahrweiler in the German state of Rhineland-Palatinate.

== Geography ==
=== Location ===
The Häuschen is located in the Ahr Eifel in the Ahrweiler Forest (Ahrweiler Wald). Its summit rises about 4.5 km south-southwest of Ahrweiler, 3 km south of Walporzheim and 2.3 km northwest of Ramersbach, which are all subdistricts of Bad Neuenahr-Ahrweiler in the Ahr valley. It is 2.7 km southeast of the village of Rech, 4 km south-southeast of the village of Dernau and 2.7 km (each as the crow flies) north-northeast of the Kesseling village of Staffel.

East of the hill rises the Wingsbach which is fed by the little Talbach and which flows northwards through the valley of Hungertal and empties into the River Ahr at Ahrweiler. To the northwest is the source of the Heckenbach, which is fed by the Beulsbach, runs north through the valley of Heckental and discharges into the Ahr at Walporzheim. To the south-southwest is the confluence of the Ahrbach and Sannerbach which forms the Ahlbach and then flows southwards before joining the Staffeler Bach (a tributary of the Kesselinger Bach).

=== Natural regions ===
The Häuschen lies within the natural region major unit group of the East Eifel (no. 27), in the major unit of the Ahr Eifel (272) and the subunit of the South Ahr Upland (Südliches Ahrbergland, 272.3), its northern flank being part of the lower subunit of the Middle Ahr Valley (Mittleres Ahrtal, 272.2) and in the natural room of the Recher Ahrengtal (272.21).

=== Height ===
The height of the Häuschen is 506.5 m but is sometimes rounded off to 505 m, which relates to the height given on the topographical map of 505.2 m, but is in fact a point about 45 metres east of the summit on a forest track. There is another spot height to the west-northwest of 498.8 m in the col between the Häuschen and its west-northwestern top (501.5 m).

== Protected areas ==
On the Häuschen lies part of the protected landscape of the Rhine-Ahr Eifel (CDDA no. 323834; designated in 1980; 925.86 km²). Its western flank descends into the bird reserve of Ahrgebirge (VSG no. 5507-401; 304.23 ha).

== Häuschen Tower ==
On 11 May 1908 an observation tower was erected on the Häuschen, the Häuschen Tower (Häuschen-Turm), which was 20 metres high. In the final phase of the Second World War (1939–1945) it housed a radio station of the Wehrmacht, and the wooden tower was burned down in spring 1945. On 30 September 1956 a new tower was inaugurated, of which only a few remains exist. From the viewing platform there was an all-round view of the Eifel including the Ahr Hills (Ahr Eifel), of Bad Neuenahr-Ahrweiler in the Ahr Valley and as far as the Siebengebirge and Westerwald.

== Transport and walking ==
The B 267 runs past the Häuschen to the north through the Ahr valley. The L 84 runs past to the east from Ahrweiler to Ramersbach, and the L 85 southwest of Kesseling to Staffel and continues east-northeast through Ramersbach. Over the hill run several trails including main trail (Hauptwanderweg) no. 11 (Sinzig–Monschau) of the Eifel Club.

== Map ==
- Hiking map of the Eifel Club Das Ahrtal, map scale = 1:25,000, Sheet 9
