= Wingsbach (Ahr) =

River in Germany

Kleebach
- watershed of the wingsbach

Location
- Country: Germany
- State: Rhineland-Palatinate

Physical characteristics
- Source
  - location: northwest of Ramersbach, Northern Eifel, North Rhine-Westphalia, Germany
  - coordinates: 50.496923°N 7.087407°E
  - elevation: 375 m (1,230 ft)
- Mouth
  - location: Ahr
  - coordinates: 50.533610°N 7.090704°E
  - elevation: 110 m (360 ft)
- Length: 4.5 km (2.8 mi)
- Basin size: 5.4 km^{2} (2.1 sq mi)

Basin features
- Progression: Ahr→ Rhine→ North Sea
- Tributaries
  - left: Häuschenbach

The Wingsbach is a small right tributary of the Ahr river. It has a length of 4.5 km and a drainage area of 5.4 km^{2}. Colloquially it is also referred to as Maibach and in its upper course is also named Talbach.

== Course ==
The source of the Wingsbach is located at the southeastern slopes of the mountain Häuschen, from there the brook flows north towards the Ahr river. About half a kilometer from its source it receives its only significant tributary the Häusschenbach arriving from the west and originating at the slopes of the Häuschen as well. Not long after receiving the Häusschenbach the brook passes two small ponds to which it provides water and a bit further down another two ponds. The upper part of the brook up to this point it also called Talbach, after that it is called Wingsbach only. Whereas the upper part was mostly forested, the brook now flows through meadows and passes the vinery Maibachfarm (earlier known as chicken farm Maibach) on its left. Then for the final part of its course it enters a small ravine before it finally empties into the Ahr river just next to the former Kalvarienberg monastery. Opposite of the Wingsbach's mouth on the other side of the Ahr river lies Walporzheim, a district of Bad Neuenahr-Ahrweiler.

== Maibachfarm and Maibachklamm ==
In its lower part the Wingsbach passes through a small ravine, the so-called Maibachklamm. A narrow footpath with twelve small wooden bridges follows the brook through the ravine, it is part of the Ahrsteig, a longer hiking trail along the Ahr river. The footpath and its bridges were first constructed in 1929 as measure to foster tourism in the region. Not far from the southern end of the ravine lies the Maibachfarm vinery, which also features rooms and a restaurant. The Maibachfarm was originally constructed as a simple farm in the 1920s by Phillipp Mies as first attempt to use the valley of the Wingsbach for agriculture. Mies however sold it 1931 to Josef Hildebrandt, who turned the compound into a chicken farm. Soon Hildebrandt added a restaurant and started to offer rooms as well. Over the years the restaurant developed into a popular destination for (local) hikers and tourists and was run by the Hildebrandt family until 1997, when it changed owners and became part of the current vinery.
