= Armuthsbach =

River in Germany

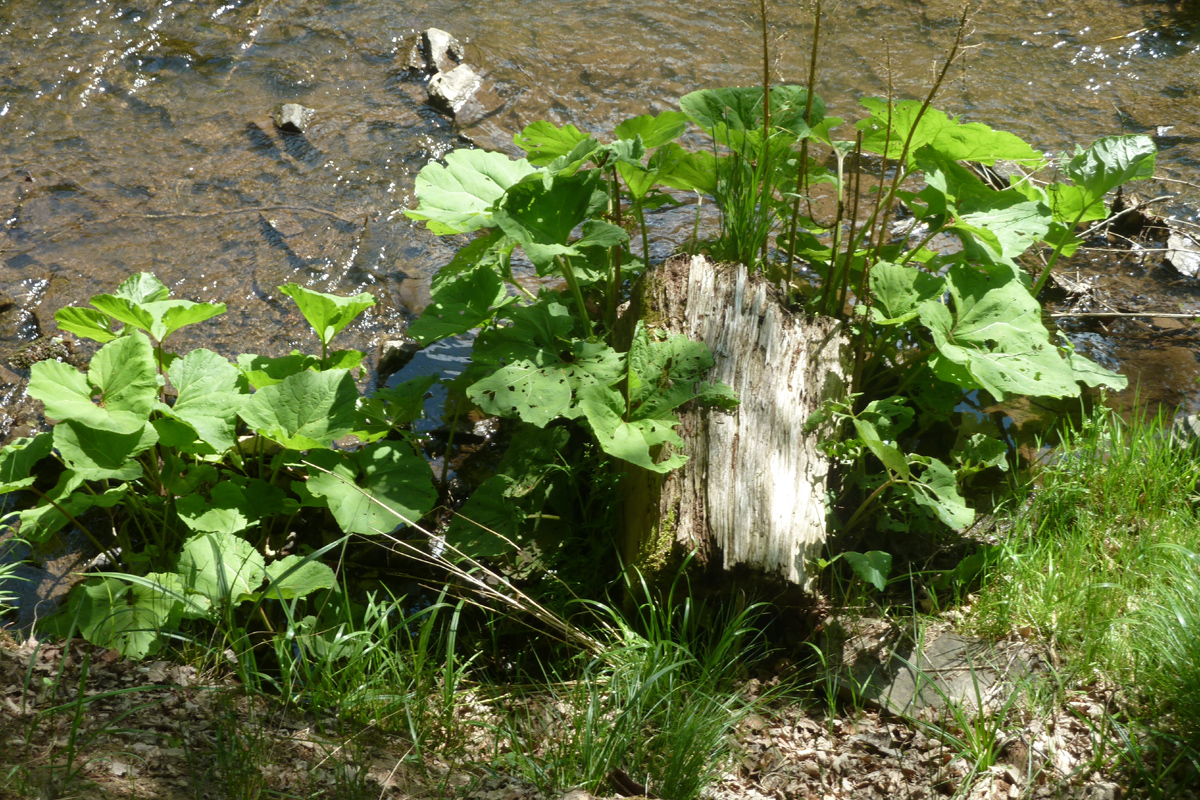
- The Armuthsbach in the vicinity of Pitscheid

Location
- Country: Germany
- States: North Rhine-Westphalia and Rhineland-Palatinate
- Reference no.: DE: 271856

Physical characteristics
- Source
  - location: South of Tondorf
  - coordinates: 50°27′34″N 6°42′04″E
  - elevation: ca. 531 m above sea level (NHN)
- Mouth
  - location: West of Schuld into the Ahr
  - coordinates: 50°26′48″N 6°52′31″E
  - elevation: ca. 245 m above sea level (NHN)
- Length: 18.372 km
- Basin size: 60.526 km^{2}

Basin features
- Progression: Ahr→ Rhine→ North Sea
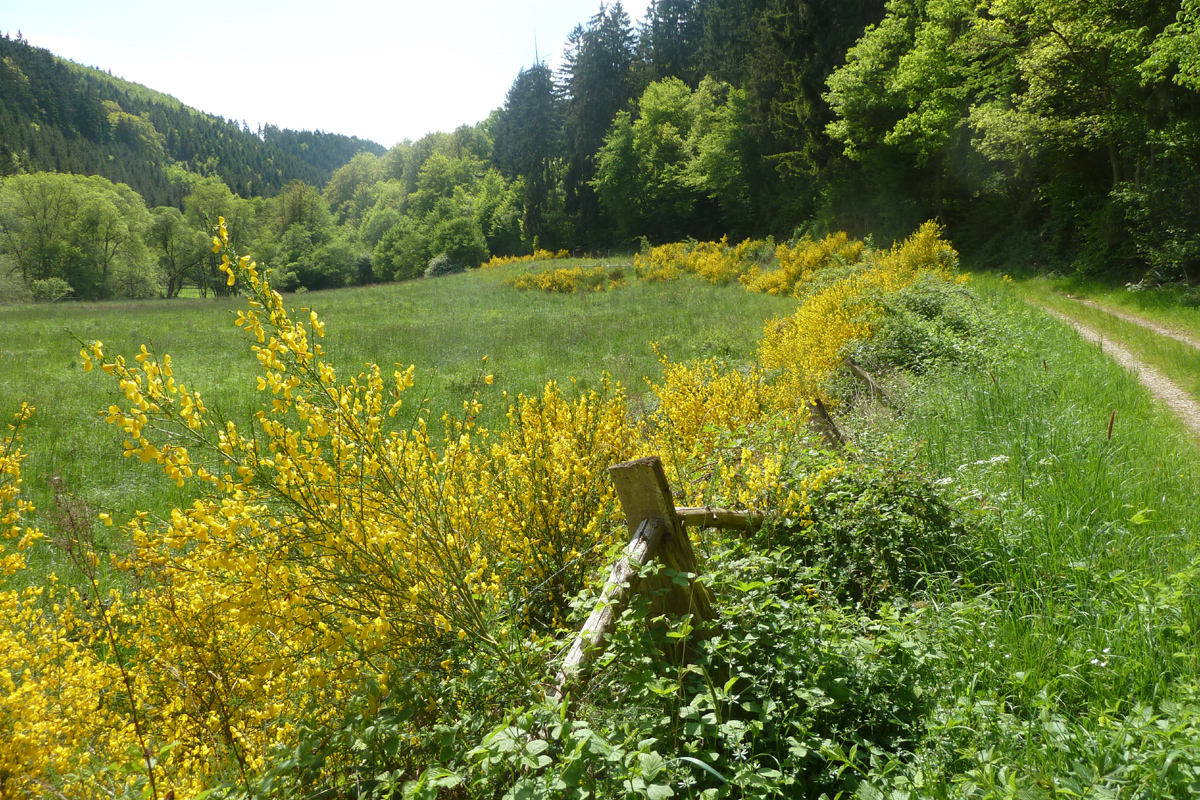
- Gorse blooms in the Armuthsbach valley between Pitscheid and Wennefeldermühle

The Armuthsbach is an 18.4-kilometre-long, orographically left-hand tributary of the Ahr in the German states of North Rhine-Westphalia and Rhineland-Palatinate.

== Geography ==
=== Course ===
The Armuthsbach rises about 1.5 km southwest of Tondorf at a height of 531 m above sea level (NHN). Its spring lies on the territory of Blankenheim. Flowing in a mainly easterly direction the Armuthsbach passes through the village of Rohr. Below the settlement the stream reaches the state border with Rhineland-Palatinate. As it continues to its mouth, there are no further villages along its course. About 400 metres north of the stream is Hümmel, about 900 metres south is Wershofen. About 800 metres west of Schuld the Armuthsbach empties into the Ahr from the left at an elevation of 245 m above NHN.

The Armuthsbach flows through the North Rhine-Westphalian nature reserve of the Armuthsbach and Tributaries (Armuthsbach und Nebenbäche).

The stream descends through 286 metres and has an average riverbed gradient of 15.5 ‰. Its catchment area covers 60.526 km^{2} and its waters drain via the Ahr and Rhine into the North Sea.

=== Tributaries ===
The most important tributary of the Armuthsbach is the 7.7-km-long Buchholz Bach. The following table lists the tributaries of the Armuthsbachs as they are recorded in the waterbody index of the state of North Rhine-Westphalia.

Name	Position [km]	Bank	Length [km]	Catchment area [km^{2}]	Mouth elevation [m above NHN]	DGKZ
Derchbach	16.588	left	1.1	1.899	472	271856 112
Mühlenbach	16.339	left	1.6		467	271856 114
Werthsbach	14,747	right	2,5		441	271856 116
Weierbach	13.490	right	1.9		419	271856 118
N.N.	12.624	right	1.0		408	271856 1192
Wellbach	12.499	left	3.1	2.133	407	271856 12
Borner Bach	11.041	left	2.5		393	271856 132
Bröhlinger Bach	9.238	left	3.3	3.987	370	271856 14
N.N.	8.013	left	1.1		351	271856 152
Mühlenseifen	5.854	left	1.6	1.040	330	271856 16
Brömmersbach	2.796	left	5.6	8.825	283	271856 18
Buchholz Bach	1.929	left	7.7	17.676	269	271856 2
Rupperather Bach	1.505	left	1.6		266	271856 92

== See also ==
- List of rivers of North Rhine-Westphalia
