= Altenahr (Verbandsgemeinde) =

- Verbandsgemeinde
- Coat of arms

- Location of Altenahr within Landkreis Ahrweiler district
- Interactive map of Altenahr
- Location within Germany Location within Rhineland-Palatinate
- Coordinates: 50°31′3″N 6°59′32″E
- Country: Germany
- State: Rhineland-Palatinate
- District: Landkreis Ahrweiler
- Subdivisions: 12 Gemeinden

Government
  - Mayor (2022–30): Dominik Gieler

Area
  - Total: 153.83 km^{2} (59.39 sq mi)

Population (2025-12-31)
  - Total: 10,396
  - Density: 67.581/km^{2} (175.03/sq mi)
- Time zone: UTC+01:00 (CET)
  - Summer (DST): UTC+02:00 (CEST)
- Vehicle registration: AW
- Website: www.altenahr.de

Altenahr (German: [ˈaltn̩.ʔaːɐ̯]) is a Verbandsgemeinde ("collective municipality") in the district of Ahrweiler, in Rhineland-Palatinate, Germany. The seat of the municipality is in Altenahr.

The Verbandsgemeinde Altenahr consists of the following Ortsgemeinden ("local municipalities"):

Municipality	Area (km²)	Population
Ahrbrück	12.56	1150
Altenahr *	14.84	1635
Berg	19.05	1282
Dernau	5.72	1532
Heckenbach	27.34	247
Hönningen	10.02	1044
Kalenborn	4.33	713
Kesseling	31.17	550
Kirchsahr	6.10	371
Lind	12.35	575
Mayschoß	5.66	768
Rech	4.69	529
Verbandsgemeinde Altenahr	153.83	10396

^{*} seat of the Verbandsgemeinde
