= Ödenbach =

Ödenbach is a geographical name and may refer to:

== Places ==
- Ödenbach (Breitnau), hamlet in the municipality of Breitnau in the county of Breisgau-Hochschwarzwald, Baden-Württemberg, Germany
- Ödenbach (Buch am Buchrain), dwelling in the municipality of Buch am Buchrain in the county of Erding, Bavaria, Germany

== Rivers and streams ==
- Ödenbach (Bühler), right tributary of the Bühler above Senzenberg, Bühlerzell, Schwäbisch Hall, Baden-Württemberg, Germany
- Ödenbach (Kreuthbach), left tributary of the Kreuthbach near Bieg, Markt Colmberg, Ansbach, Bavaria, which empties into the Altmühl
- Ödenbach (Unkenbach), right tributary of the Unkenbach in the municipality of Unken, Zell am See, Salzburg, Austria, which flows into the Saalach

== See also ==
- Odenbach (disambiguation)
