= Nonnenbach (Ahr) =

River in Germany

Location
- Country: Germany
- State: North Rhine-Westphalia
- Reference no.: DE: 271812

Physical characteristics
- Source
  - location: Dahlem-Schmidtheim
  - coordinates: 50°24′49″N 6°35′22″E
  - elevation: 539 m above sea level (NHN)
- Mouth
  - location: Ahr near Blankenheim
  - coordinates: 50°25′27″N 6°40′14″E
  - elevation: 407 m above sea level (NHN)
- Length: 6.992 km
- Basin size: 10.885 km^{2}

Basin features
- Progression: Ahr→ Rhine→ North Sea
- Landmarks: Villages: Nonnenbach

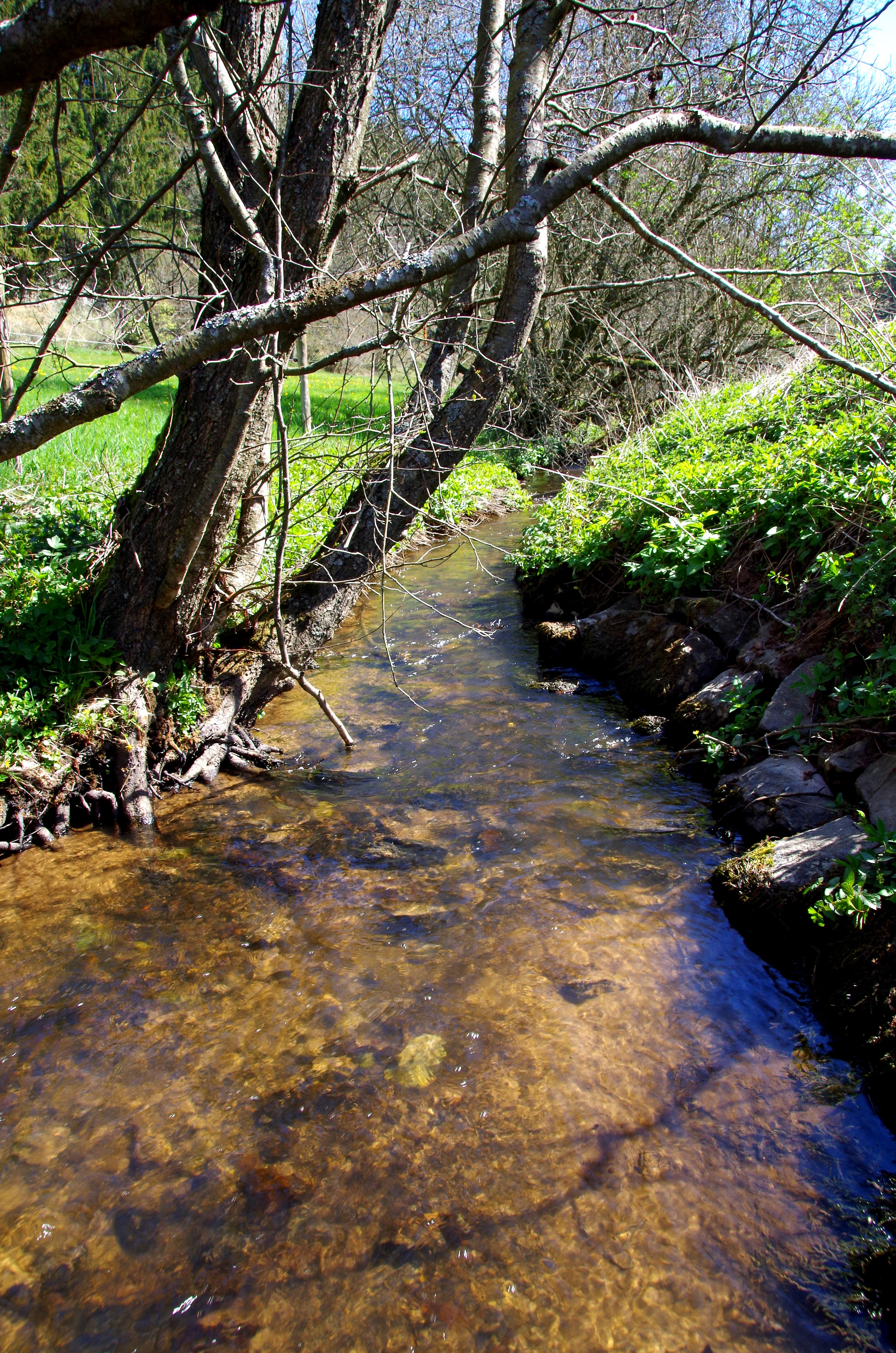

The Nonnenbach is a seven-kilometre-long tributary of the Ahr in the area of Blankenheim in the district of Euskirchen in the German state of North Rhine-Westphalia.

== Geography ==
=== Course ===
The source of the Nonnenbach lies in woods about 2 kilometres east of Schmidtheim, on the far side of the B 51 and not far from gravel pits already partly filled with groundwater. It flows past the eponymous village and empties into the Ahr a good 2 kilometres south of Blankenheim. Apart from the Seidenbach and the Günzelbach it is also fed during its short course by the streams of numerous gullies, known locally as Seifen.

=== Tributaries ===
- Mittlerer Seifen (left)
- Seidenbach (left), 2.0 km
- Günzelbach (left), 1.8 km
- Wallbach (left), 1.8 km

== See also ==
- List of rivers of North Rhine-Westphalia
