= Kirchsahr =

- Municipality
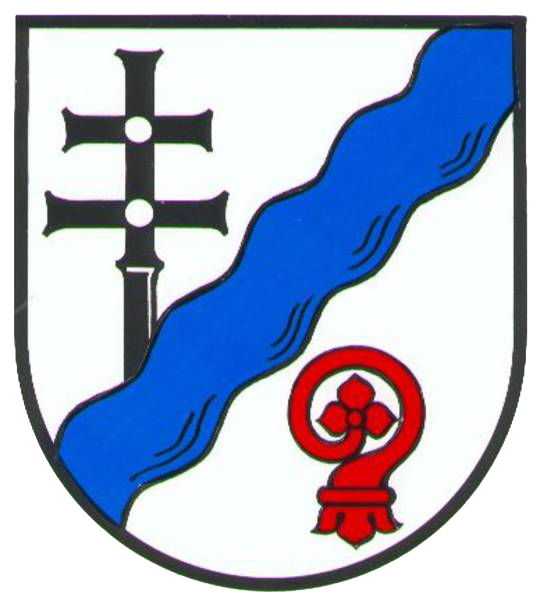
- Coat of arms

- Location of Kirchsahr within Ahrweiler district
- Interactive map of Kirchsahr
- Location within Germany Location within Rhineland-Palatinate
- Coordinates: 50°31′28″N 06°53′54″E
- Country: Germany
- State: Rhineland-Palatinate
- District: Ahrweiler
- Municipal assoc.: Altenahr
- Subdivisions: 5

Government
  - Mayor (2019–24): Stefan Zavelberg

Area
  - Total: 6.11 km^{2} (2.36 sq mi)
- Elevation: 288 m (945 ft)

Population (2025-12-31)
  - Total: 371
  - Density: 60.7/km^{2} (157/sq mi)
- Time zone: UTC+01:00 (CET)
  - Summer (DST): UTC+02:00 (CEST)
- Postal codes: 53505
- Dialling codes: 02643
- Vehicle registration: AW
- Website: www.kirchsahr.de

Kirchsahr is a municipality in the district of Ahrweiler, in Rhineland-Palatinate, Germany.

== Geography ==
Kirchsahr consists of the districts Kirchsahr, Binzenbach, Burgsahr, Hürnig and Winnen. It lies near the state border of Rhineland-Palatinate and North Rhine-Westphalia.
