= 1910 European floods =

June 1910 flooding in Europe

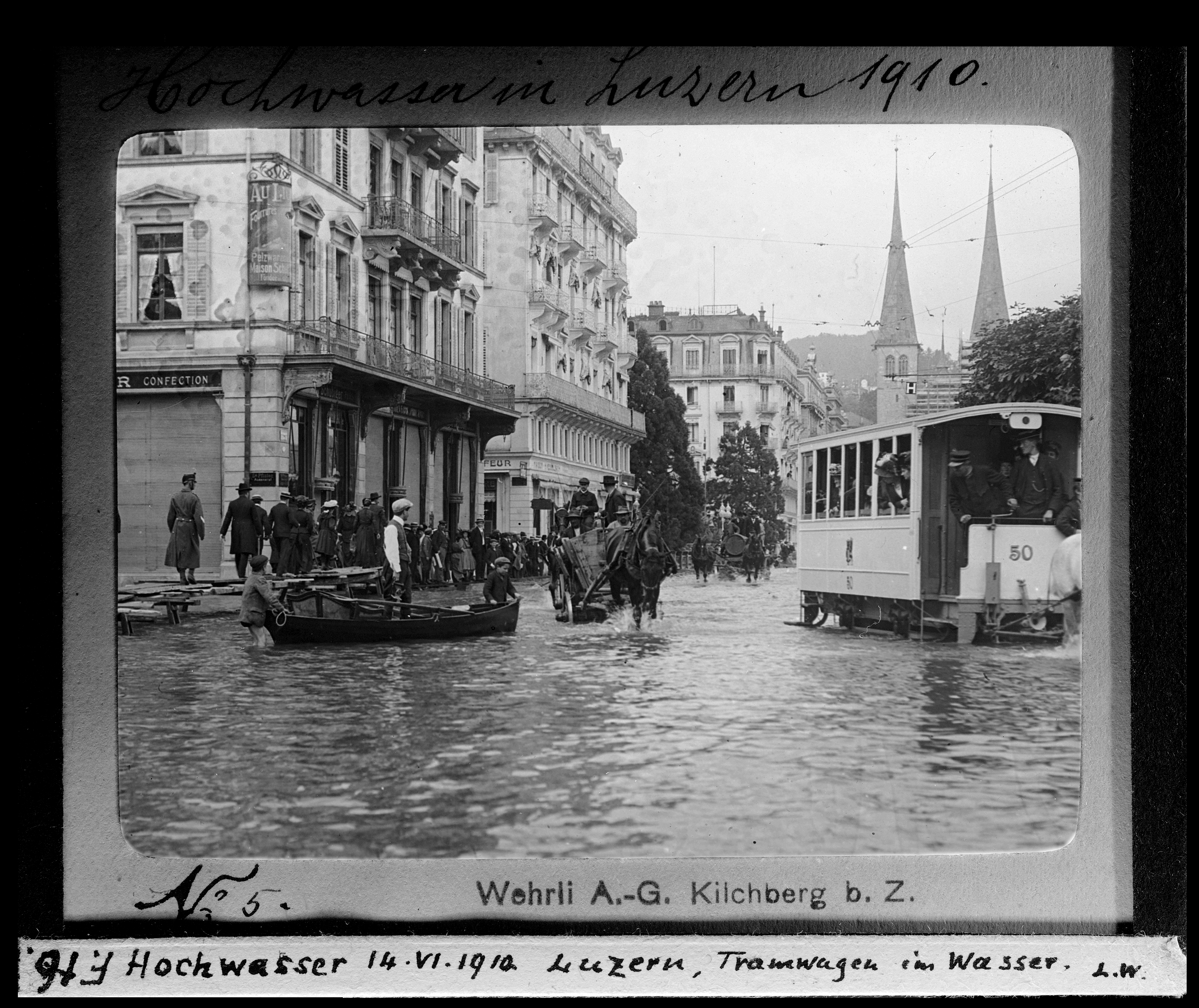
- Postcard of the flooding in Lucerne on June 14, 1910
- Date: Mid-June 1910
- Location: Austria-Hungary Belgium German Empire Serbia Switzerland
- Deaths: 1200+: ~200 in Germany; ~1000 in Hungary; 26 in Switzerland; 35 in Serbia

The 1910 European floods were a series of floods that struck Central Europe in mid-June 1910. The flooding was the result of several days of heavy rains, and resulted in severe flooding to the Ahr River in Germany, which killed up to 200 people in the Ahr Valley. The town of Schuld was particularly hard hit where at least 50 people were reported to have been killed after a bridge gave way during the flooding. Reports from the time also claimed that almost every bridge in the valley was destroyed by the flooding.

The rains also resulted in flooding in Switzerland, where at least 26 people were reported to have been killed around Lake Lucerne. Flooding was reported in Lucerne and Zürich where the city electric lighting systems were compromised. The worst human loss, however was reported in the Kingdom of Hungary, where over 1,000 people were reported killed, which was reported as "exceeding all records". Elsewhere severe flooding also occurred in Austria-Hungary, Belgium, and the Kingdom of Serbia. Serbia, in particular, saw severe flooding on the Great Morava river, which resulted in severe damage to cities such as Jagodina, as well as an additional 35 fatalities.
