= Heckenbach =

- Municipality
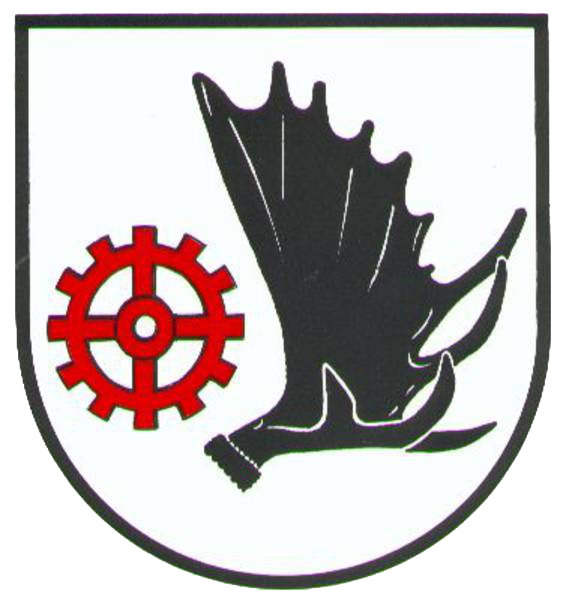
- Coat of arms

- Location of Heckenbach within Ahrweiler district
- Interactive map of Heckenbach
- Location within Germany Location within Rhineland-Palatinate
- Coordinates: 50°28′N 07°04′E
- Country: Germany
- State: Rhineland-Palatinate
- District: Ahrweiler
- Municipal assoc.: Altenahr
- Subdivisions: 8

Government
  - Mayor (2019–24): Heinrich Groß

Area
  - Total: 27.34 km^{2} (10.56 sq mi)
- Elevation: 379 m (1,243 ft)

Population (2025-12-31)
  - Total: 247
  - Density: 9.03/km^{2} (23.4/sq mi)
- Time zone: UTC+01:00 (CET)
  - Summer (DST): UTC+02:00 (CEST)
- Postal codes: 53506
- Dialling codes: 02655, 02647, 02646
- Vehicle registration: AW
- Website: www.altenahr.de

Heckenbach is a municipality in the district of Ahrweiler, in Rhineland-Palatinate, Germany.

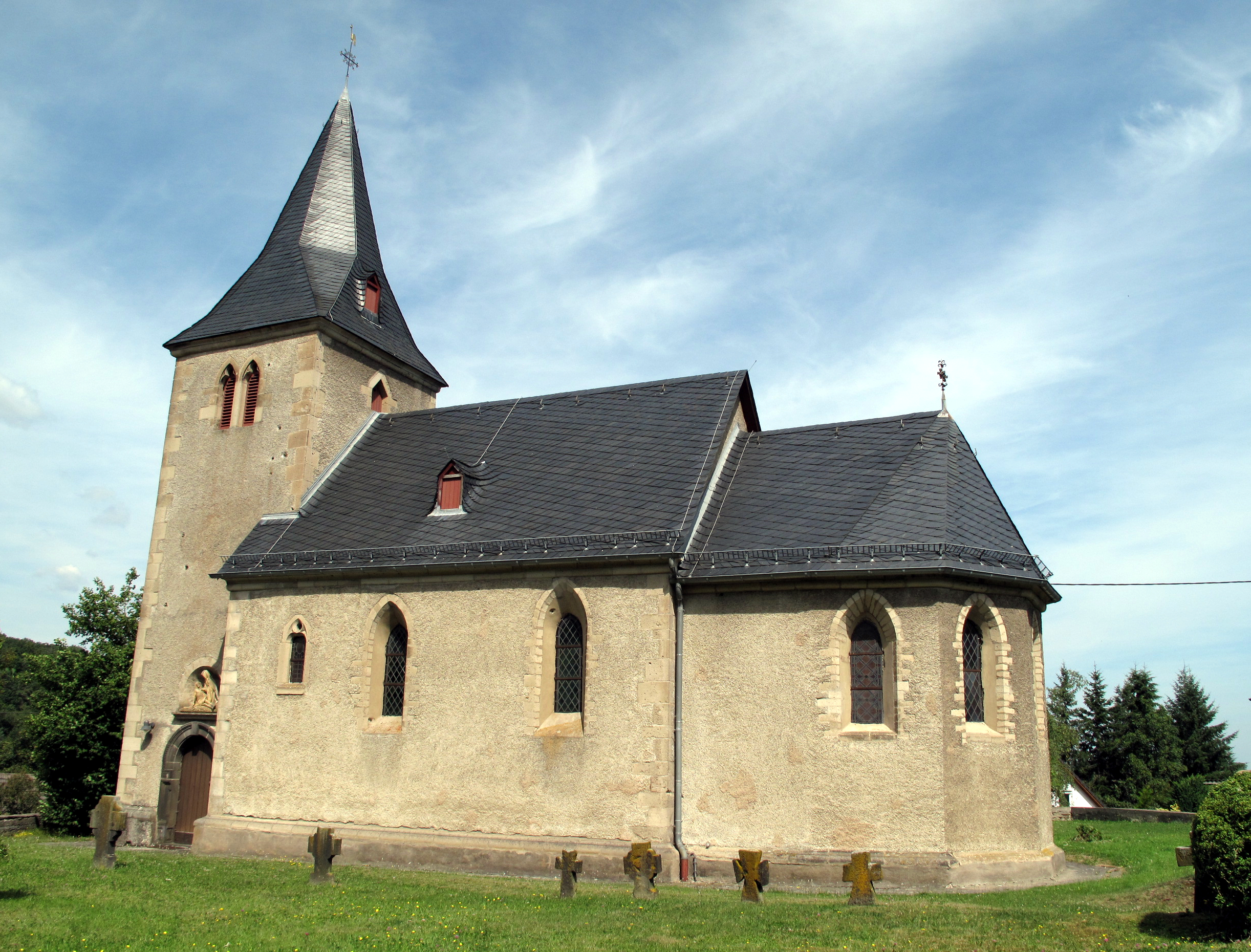
Heckenbach, church
