= Blankenheim Castle =

Castle in Blankenheim, Germany

- Burg Blankenheim
- Blankenheim
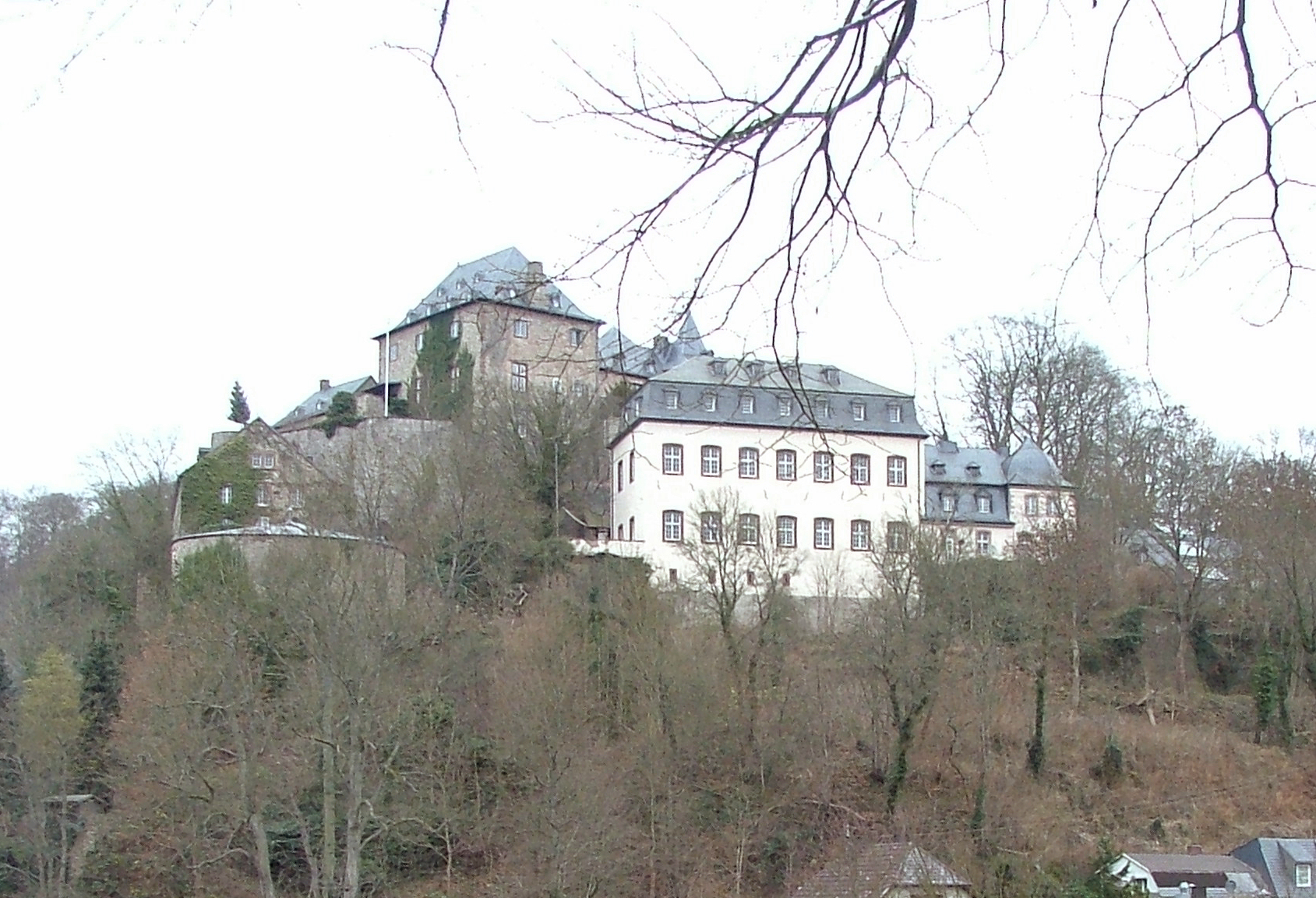
- Blankenheim Castle from the south

Site information
- Type: hill castle
- Code: DE-NW
- Condition: largely preserved

Location
- Coordinates: 50°26′16″N 6°39′06″E
- Height: Height missing, see template documentation

Site history
- Built: around 1115

Garrison information
- Occupants: counts

Blankenheim Castle (German: Burg Blankenheim) is a schloss above the village of Blankenheim in the Eifel mountains of Germany. It was built as a hill castle around 1115 by Gerhard I and became the family seat of the House of Blankenheim. The lords of Blankenheim were elevated to the countship in 1380. The counts were related to the counts of Manderscheid and, from 1469, were named Manderscheid-Blankenheim. With the extinction of the lines of Manderscheid-Gerolstein and Manderscheid-Kail (1742) the County of Manderscheid became the largest independent territorial lordship in the Eifel.

== Site ==
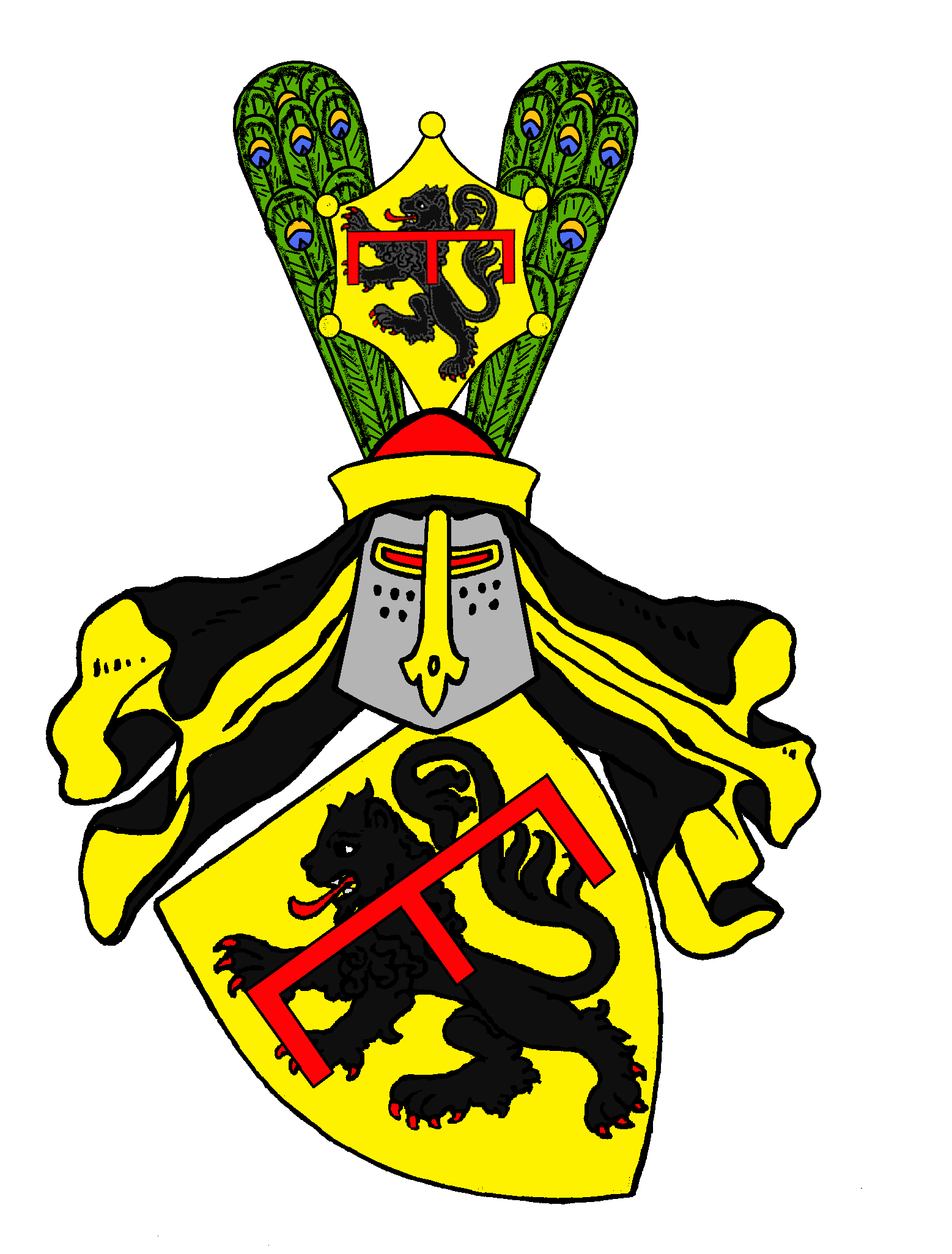
Coat of arms of the dynasties of Blankenheim

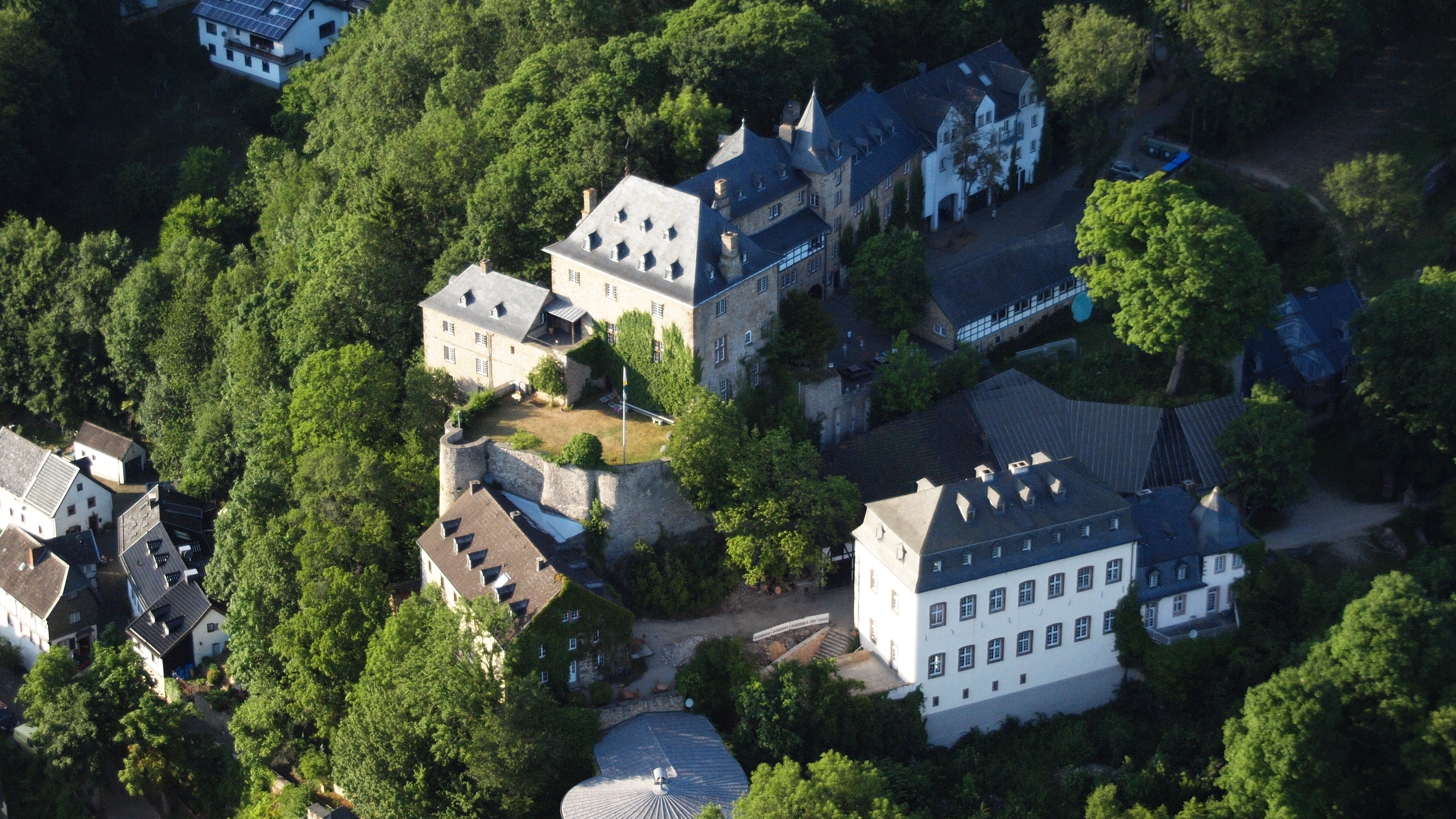
Blankenheim from the air, 2015

The site has been remodelled on numerous occasions. In the course of time the mediaeval defensive site was converted into a Baroque schloss with a Baroque garden and an orangery. Its end came in September 1794, when French troops marched into Blankenheim. Countess Augusta of Manderscheid-Blankenheim and her family fled to Bohemia.

For a long time the castle remained uninhabited until, in 1894, Prussia started work on safety measures. In 1926 it was taken over by the German Gymnastics Club and, in 1936, the site was acquired by the German Youth Hostel Association. They converted the castle into a youth hostel.

In 1996 the wildlife park tunnel was rediscovered. It is a noteworthy water supply gallery. Although the River Ahr flows nearby, the castle depended on rainwater. As a result, Count Dietrich III of Manderscheid-Blankenheim had a water supply tunnel excavated in 1469. The water from the spring In der Rhenn was thereby diverted from about a kilometre away and led to the castle.

== Personalities ==
The lawyer and Catholic politician, Moritz Lieber, was born on 1 October 1790 at Blankenheim Castle.
