= Berg, Ahrweiler =

Berg
- Municipality
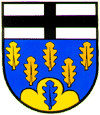
- Coat of arms

- Location of Berg within Ahrweiler district
- Interactive map of Berg
- Location within Germany Location within Rhineland-Palatinate
- Coordinates: 50°33′20″N 06°56′49″E
- Country: Germany
- State: Rhineland-Palatinate
- District: Ahrweiler
- Municipal assoc.: Altenahr
- Subdivisions: 6

Government
  - Mayor (2019–24): Erwin Keßel (CDU)

Area
  - Total: 19.05 km^{2} (7.36 sq mi)
- Elevation: 333 m (1,093 ft)

Population (2025-12-31)
  - Total: 1,282
  - Density: 67.30/km^{2} (174.3/sq mi)
- Time zone: UTC+01:00 (CET)
  - Summer (DST): UTC+02:00 (CEST)
- Postal codes: 53505
- Dialling codes: 02643
- Vehicle registration: AW
- Website: www.berg-aw.de

Berg (German pronunciation: [bɛʁk]) is a municipality in the district of Ahrweiler, in Rhineland-Palatinate, Germany.

The municipality consists of the following villages: Berg, Freisheim, Krälingen, Häselingen, Vellen and Vischel.
