= Schuld =

- Municipality
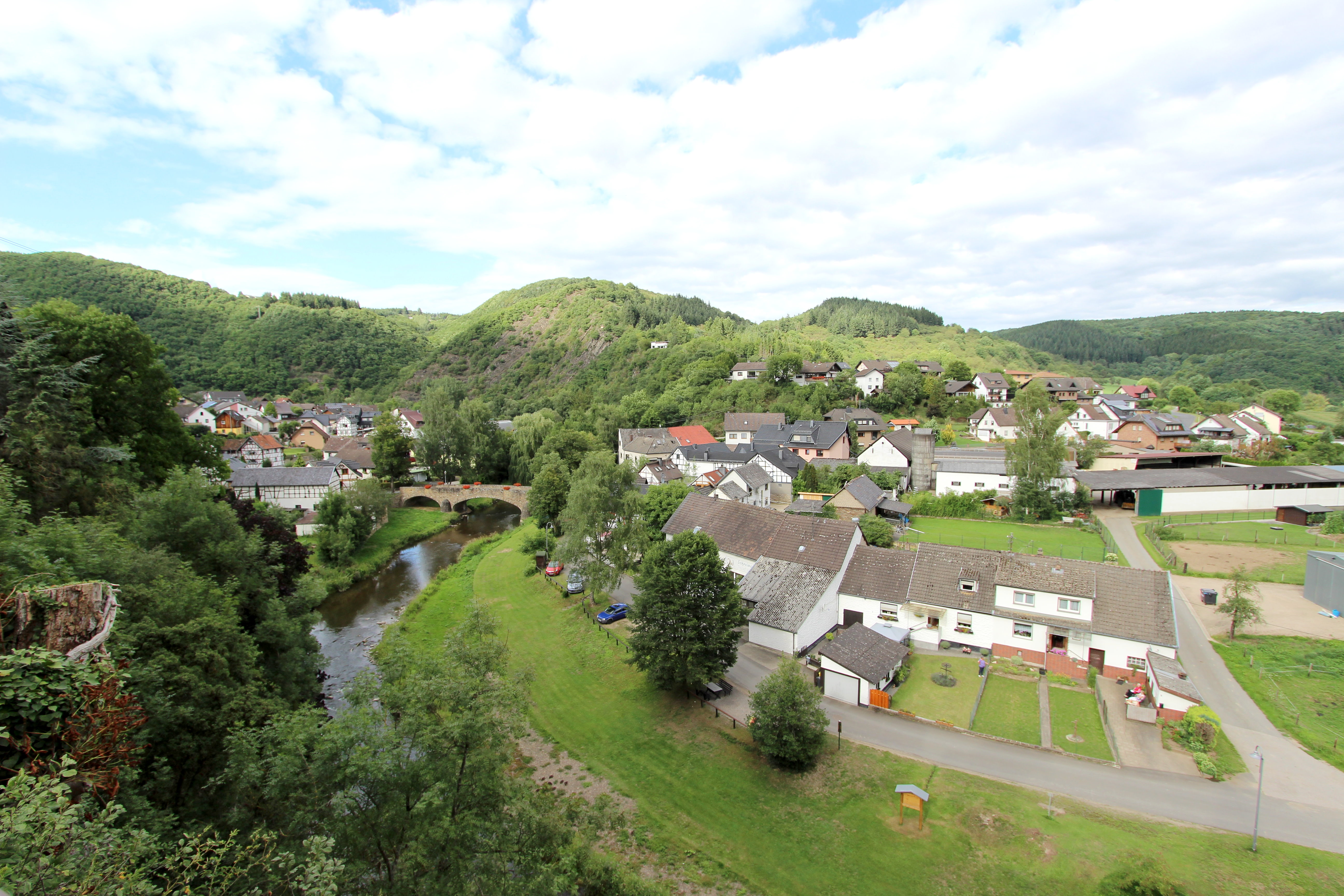

- Coat of arms

- Location of Schuld within Ahrweiler district
- Interactive map of Schuld
- Location within Germany Location within Rhineland-Palatinate
- Coordinates: 50°26′45″N 06°53′22″E
- Country: Germany
- State: Rhineland-Palatinate
- District: Ahrweiler
- Municipal assoc.: Adenau

Government
  - Mayor (2019–24): Helmut Lussi

Area
  - Total: 5.93 km^{2} (2.29 sq mi)
- Elevation: 161 m (528 ft)

Population (2025-12-31)
  - Total: 609
  - Density: 103/km^{2} (266/sq mi)
- Time zone: UTC+01:00 (CET)
  - Summer (DST): UTC+02:00 (CEST)
- Postal codes: 53520
- Dialling codes: 02695
- Vehicle registration: AW
- Website: www.schuld-ahr.de

Schuld (German pronunciation: [ˈʃʊlt]) is a municipality in the district of Ahrweiler, in Rhineland-Palatinate, Germany, on the River Ahr.

In July 2021, the village was severely damaged by floods. Approximately 50 houses were damaged. The town had previously been devastated by another flash flood in 1910 in which 50 villagers perished.
