= Ahrbrück =

- Municipality
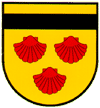
- Coat of arms

- Location of Ahrbrück within Ahrweiler district
- Interactive map of Ahrbrück
- Location within Germany Location within Rhineland-Palatinate
- Coordinates: 50°28′57″N 06°59′21″E
- Country: Germany
- State: Rhineland-Palatinate
- District: Ahrweiler
- Municipal assoc.: Altenahr

Government
  - Mayor (2019–24): Walter Radermacher

Area
  - Total: 12.56 km^{2} (4.85 sq mi)
- Elevation: 186 m (610 ft)

Population (2025-12-31)
  - Total: 1,150
  - Density: 91.6/km^{2} (237/sq mi)
- Time zone: UTC+01:00 (CET)
  - Summer (DST): UTC+02:00 (CEST)
- Postal codes: 53506
- Dialling codes: 02643
- Vehicle registration: AW
- Website: gemeinde-ahrbrueck.de

Ahrbrück (German pronunciation: [ˈaːɐ̯bʁʏk]) is a municipality in the district of Ahrweiler, in Rhineland-Palatinate, Germany. The municipality comprises the three districts of Ahrbrück (formerly known as Denn), Brück and Pützfeld.

== History ==
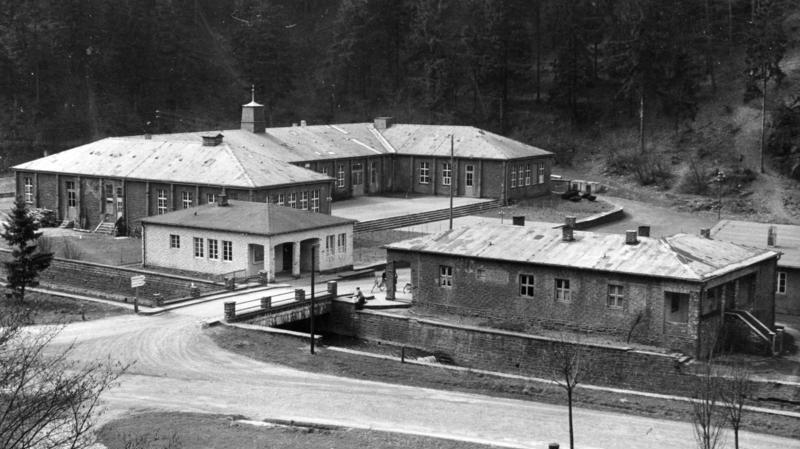
Ahrbrück crystal factory in a refugee operation, April 1952

In 893, Pützfeld was mentioned as a possession of the monastery of Prüm. The rural communities of Bruck and Denn were first documented in 1265. In the 13th century, the three settlements belonged to the County of Are and by 1246 they were part of the Electorate of Cologne. Pützfeld had a larger castle and by 1681 it's Lady chapel was built next to the river Ahr.

In 1938, the citizens of Denn were evacuated to permit the establishment of an Air Force training area. The town was renamed Ahrbrück when the settlement was re-colonized after the Second World War. The Ahrbrück crystal factory became a refuge for ethnic Germans expelled from Sudetenland.

Today's church was rebuilt on 7 June 1969, after the dissolution of the previously independent municipalities of Ahrbrück (502 inhabitants), Brück (443 inhabitants) and Pützfeld (230 inhabitants).

=== Population ===
Population as of 31. December:

- 1815: 1936
- 1835: 2419
- 1871: 2146
- 1905: 2309
- 1939: 560
- 1950: 592
- 1961:1041
- 1965: 1073
- 1970: 1179
- 1975: 1207
- 1980: 1116
- 1985: 1032
- 1987: 551
- 1990: 1124
- 1995: 1127
- 2000: 1185
- 2005: 1244
- 2009: 1218
- 2010: 1218
- 2011: 1215
- 2012: 1209
- 2013: 1162
- 2014: 1168
- 2015: 1182
- 2016: 1248
- 2017: 1200
- 2018: 1185
- 2019: 1185
- 2021: 1076
- 2022: 1058
- 2023: 1097
- 2024: 1141
- 2025: ~1.2

Data source:

Statistical Office of Rhineland-Palatinate (1815-2011 [Excluding 2009 and 2010])

Information about the municipality Ahrbrück (2009-2019)
Wikidata: Ahrbrück (2021-2023)
Germany: Rhineland-Palatinate Population Map (2024)
Ahrbrück on the Map (2025)

== Politics ==
The local council in Ahrbrück consists of 16 Council members who were elected by the local elections of 7 June 2009. The council appoints an honorary mayor as chairman.

Distribution of seats in the elected council:

Year	SPD	CDU	FDP	FWG	Total
2009	2	9	1	4	16 seats
2004	2	10	–	4	16 seats
1999	3	4	–	9	16 seats

== Culture ==
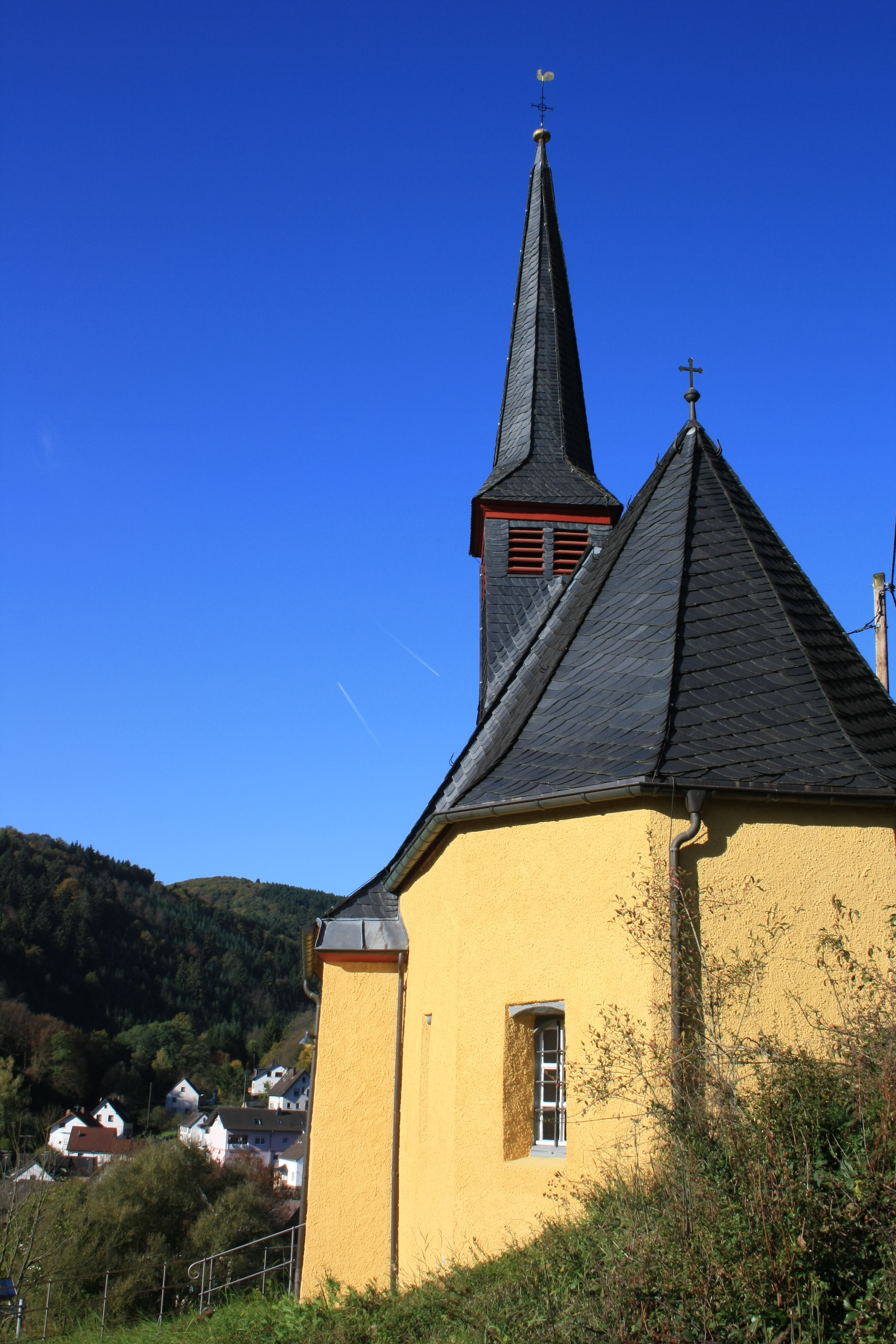
St. Katharina in Brück

Notable are the village chapels of St. Rochus in Ahrbrück and of St. Katharina in Brück. Additionally, the baroque shrine Marien-Wallfahrtskapelle (English: Mary shrine) in Pützfeld was restored in 1993.
