= Nonnenbach (Bodensee) =

River in Germany

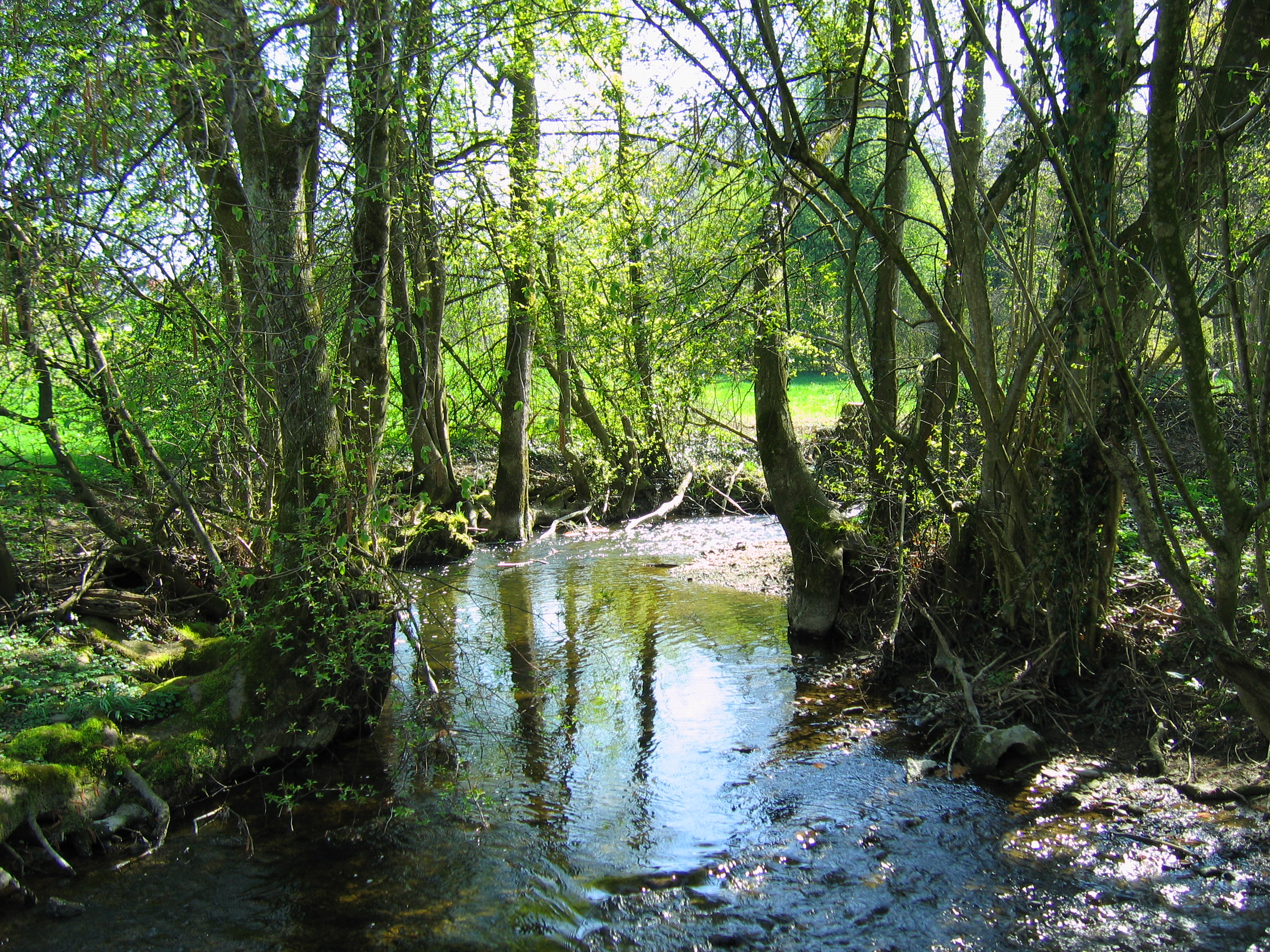
- The Nonnenbach at Kressbronn

Location
- Country: Germany
- States: Baden-Württemberg and Bavaria

Physical characteristics
- Mouth
  - location: Kressbronn am Bodensee, Lake Constance
  - coordinates: 47.5869°N 9.5872°E
- Length: 16.4 km (10.2 mi)

Basin features
- Progression: Rhine→ North Sea

Nonnenbach is a river of Baden-Württemberg and Bavaria, Germany. It is a tributary of Lake Constance, which is drained by the Rhine, near Kressbronn am Bodensee.

== See also ==
- List of rivers of Baden-Württemberg
- List of rivers of Bavaria
