= Lind, Ahrweiler =

Lind
- Municipality
- Coat of arms

- Location of Lind within Ahrweiler district
- Interactive map of Lind
- Location within Germany Location within Rhineland-Palatinate
- Coordinates: 50°29′45″N 6°56′20″E
- Country: Germany
- State: Rhineland-Palatinate
- District: Ahrweiler
- Municipal assoc.: Altenahr
- Subdivisions: 3

Government
  - Mayor (2019–24): Werner Zavelberg

Area
  - Total: 12.36 km^{2} (4.77 sq mi)
- Elevation: 450 m (1,480 ft)

Population (2025-12-31)
  - Total: 575
  - Density: 46.5/km^{2} (120/sq mi)
- Time zone: UTC+01:00 (CET)
  - Summer (DST): UTC+02:00 (CEST)
- Postal codes: 53506
- Dialling codes: 02643
- Vehicle registration: AW
- Website: www.lind-ahr.de

Lind (German pronunciation: [lɪnt]) is a municipality in the district of Ahrweiler, in Rhineland-Palatinate, Germany.
