= Kalenborn, Ahrweiler =

Kalenborn
- Municipality
- Coat of arms

- Location of Kalenborn within Ahrweiler district
- Interactive map of Kalenborn
- Location within Germany Location within Rhineland-Palatinate
- Coordinates: 50°32′56″N 06°59′36″E
- Country: Germany
- State: Rhineland-Palatinate
- District: Ahrweiler
- Municipal assoc.: Altenahr

Government
  - Mayor (2019–24): Annette Winnen (CDU)

Area
  - Total: 4.32 km^{2} (1.67 sq mi)
- Elevation: 365 m (1,198 ft)

Population (2025-12-31)
  - Total: 713
  - Density: 165/km^{2} (427/sq mi)
- Time zone: UTC+01:00 (CET)
  - Summer (DST): UTC+02:00 (CEST)
- Postal codes: 53505
- Dialling codes: 02643
- Vehicle registration: AW

Kalenborn (German pronunciation: [ˈkaːlənbɔʁn]) is a municipality in the district of Ahrweiler, in Rhineland-Palatinate, Germany.
