= Kesseling =

- Municipality
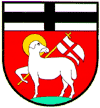
- Coat of arms

- Location of Kesseling within Ahrweiler district
- Interactive map of Kesseling
- Location within Germany Location within Rhineland-Palatinate
- Coordinates: 50°29′31″N 07°01′34″E
- Country: Germany
- State: Rhineland-Palatinate
- District: Ahrweiler
- Municipal assoc.: Altenahr
- Subdivisions: 3

Government
  - Mayor (2019–24): Guido Schmitz

Area
  - Total: 31.13 km^{2} (12.02 sq mi)
- Elevation: 228 m (748 ft)

Population (2025-12-31)
  - Total: 550
  - Density: 18/km^{2} (46/sq mi)
- Time zone: UTC+01:00 (CET)
  - Summer (DST): UTC+02:00 (CEST)
- Postal codes: 53506
- Dialling codes: 02647
- Vehicle registration: AW
- Website: www.gemeinde-kesseling.de

Kesseling (German pronunciation: [ˈkɛsəlɪŋ]) is a municipality in the district of Ahrweiler, in Rhineland-Palatinate, Germany.

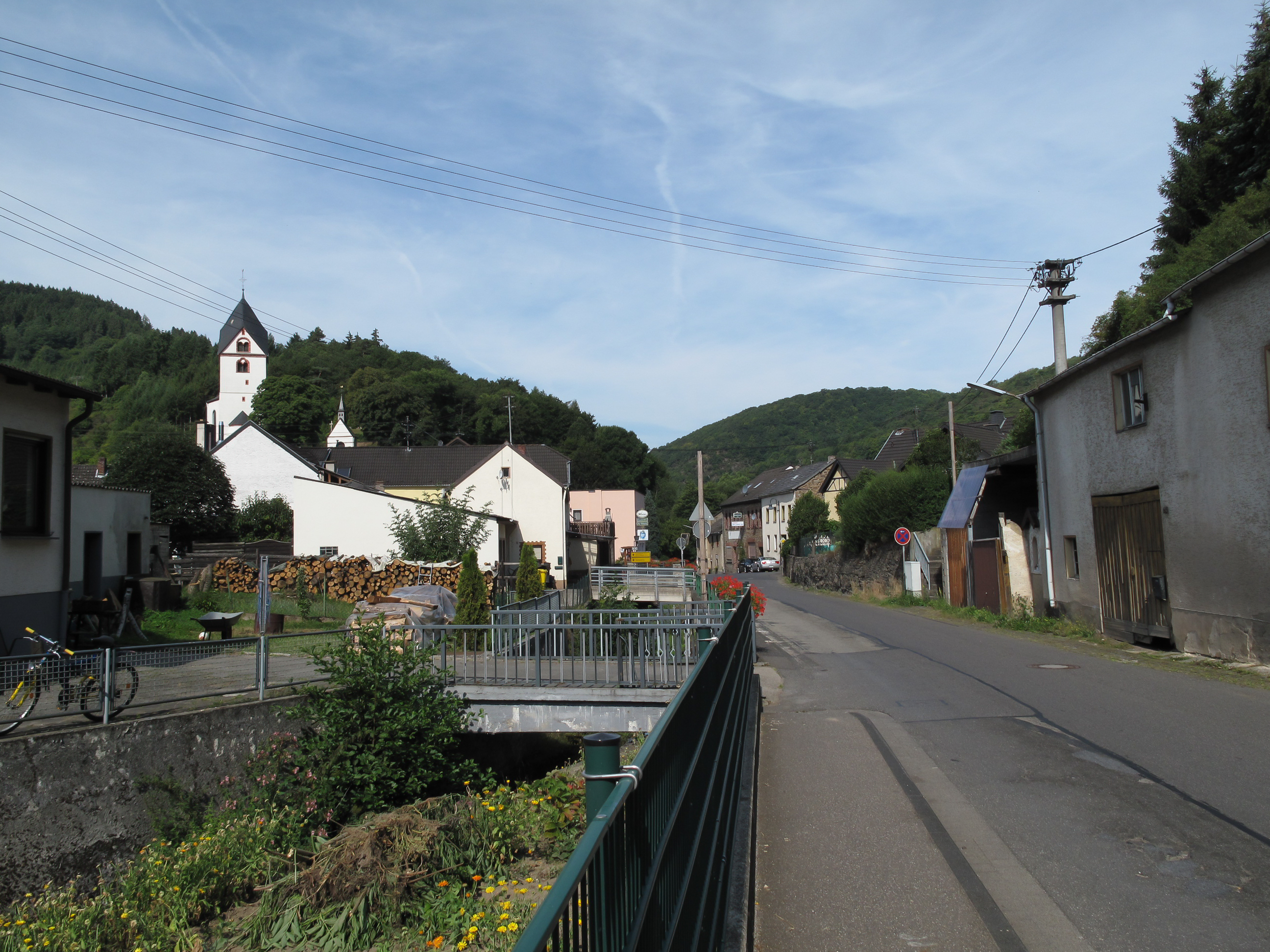
Kesseling, view to the village
