= Ahr =

River in Germany

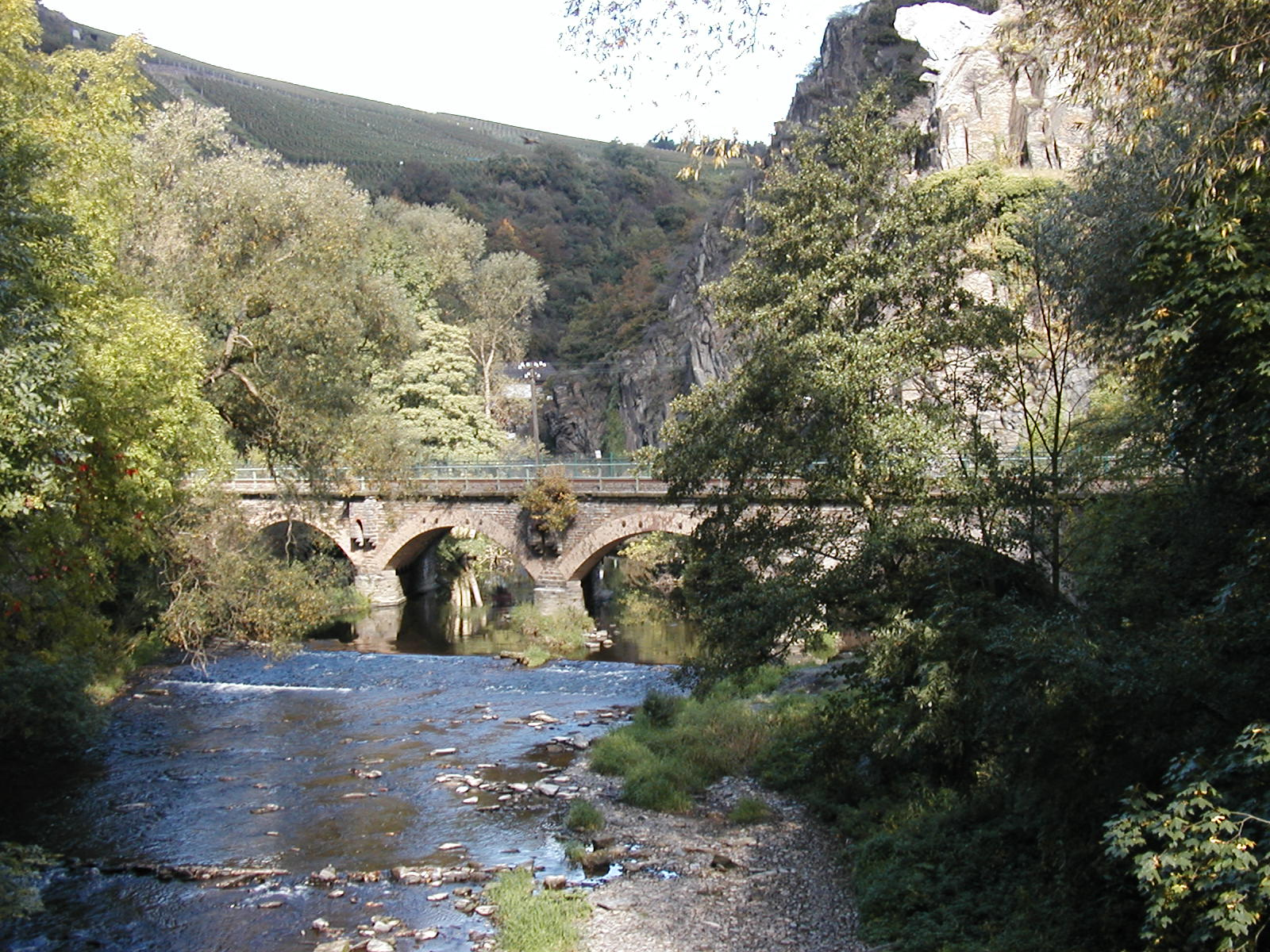
- In the valley of the Ahr

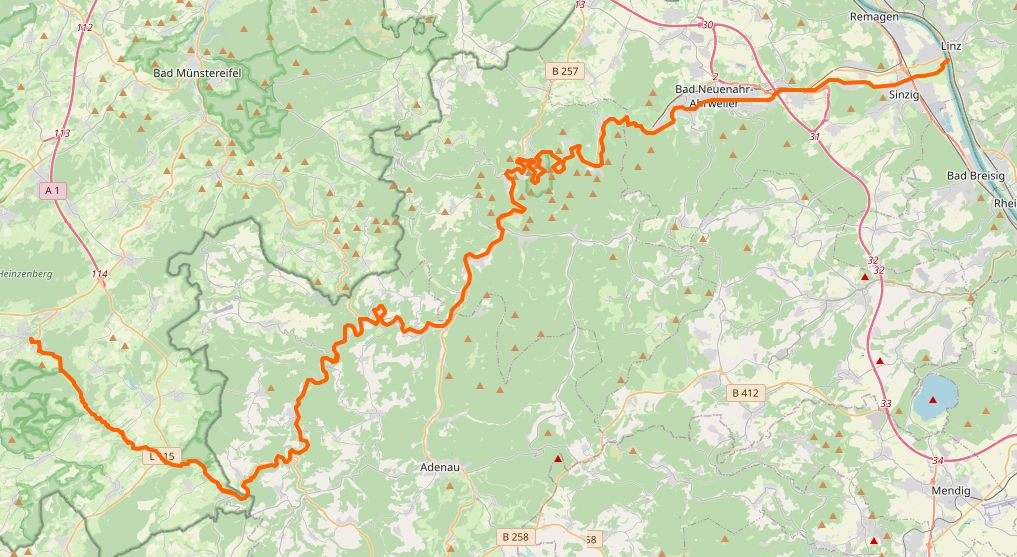
- The river Ahr
- Etymology: Old High German aha ("water")

Location
- Country: Germany

Physical characteristics
- Source
  - location: Blankenheim, Northern Eifel, North Rhine-Westphalia, Germany
  - coordinates: 50.438°N 6.6494°E
  - elevation: 470 m (1,540 ft)
- Mouth: Rhine
  - location: Remagen, Rhineland-Palatinate, Germany
  - coordinates: 50°33′34″N 7°16′37″E
  - elevation: 58 m (190 ft)
- Length: 89 km (55 mi)
- Basin size: 900 km^{2} (350 sq mi)
- Discharge
  - average: 8.9 m^{3}/s (310 cu ft/s)

Basin features
- Progression: Rhine→ North Sea

Ahr (German pronunciation: [ˈaːɐ̯]) is a river in Germany, a left tributary of the Rhine. Its source is at an elevation of approximately 470 metres (1,540 ft) above sea level in Blankenheim in the Eifel, in the cellar of a timber-frame house near the castle of Blankenheim. After 18 kilometres (11 mi) it crosses from North Rhine-Westphalia into Rhineland-Palatinate.

The Ahr flows through Ahr valley or Ahrtal, passing through the towns of Schuld, Altenahr and Bad Neuenahr-Ahrweiler. Between Remagen and Sinzig (south of Bonn), at about 50 metres (160 ft) above sea level, it flows into the Rhine. The length is roughly 89 kilometres (55 mi), of which 68 kilometres (42 mi) is within Rhineland-Palatinate. The Ahr has a gradient of 0.4 percent in its lower course, and 0.4 to 0.8 percent in its upper course.

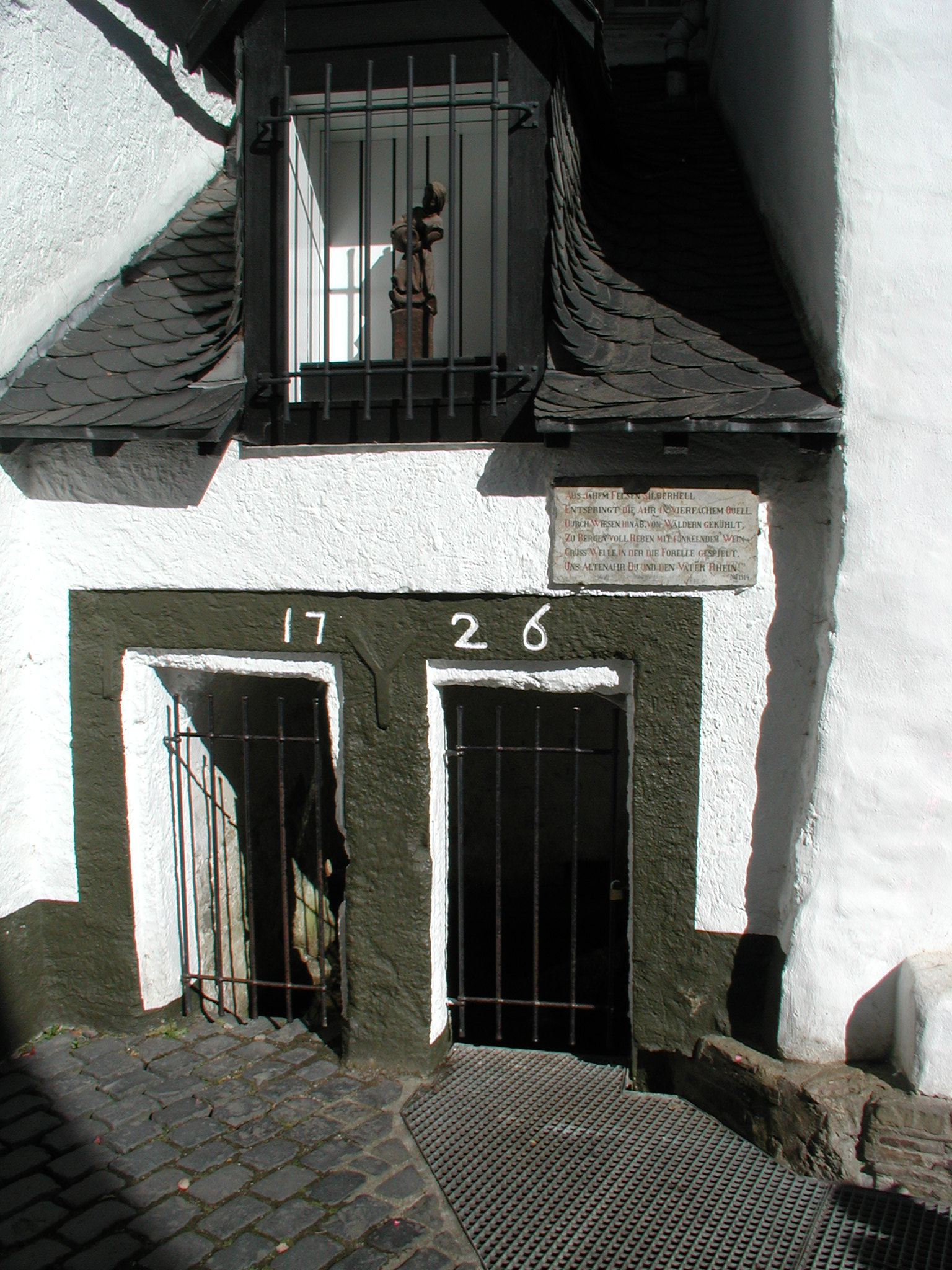
Source of Ahr in Blankenheim

The Ahr and its tributaries are a main drainage system of the eastern Eifel. The watershed is approximately 900 square kilometres (350 mi^{2}).

== History ==
There were isolated settlements in the Ahr valley beginning at the latest in Roman times, evidenced by the Roman villa near Ahrweiler. Owing to their isolated location, the upper and middle parts of the course were sparsely populated.

That began changing in the mid-19th century. The development of settlements and transportation routes (including three railway lines) and the expansion of the area used for agriculture in the Ahr valley led to the narrowing and constraint of the riverbed. The course of the river was graded and its banks were stabilized.

Catastrophic flash flooding occurred on the Ahr in 1910 and 2021 resulting in the deaths of hundreds.

== Course ==
The Ahr rises in the middle of the village of Blankenheim, in the Eifel region of the German state of North Rhine-Westphalia, in the basement of a timber-framed house in an enclosed spring at a height of 474 m above sea level (NHN). It then flows through the Schwanenweiher pond below Blankenheim Castle.

The stream, which runs in a south-easterly direction, through the valley meadows of upper Ahr valley, has not cut very deeply into the heights of the Eifel. Much of the upper Ahr valley is protected and follows the B 258 federal road. Below the hamlet of Ahrdorf in the municipality of Blankenheim, the Ahr reaches its southernmost point and enters the state of Rhineland-Palatine. From Müsch via Antweiler to Fuchshofen, the river runs northwards and turns east at Schuld heading through Insul to Dümpelfeld. Here, the Ahr collects the waters of the Adenauer Bach coming from the right and flowing in a northeasterly direction. In Altenahr, the valley bends to the east and initially follows a very winding course. Here the river is accompanied by the B 267, although it does not follow every loop in the river. In Altenahr, the largest bend in the river beings; it is protected because of its flora and fauna. From here, the valley becomes a gorge bordered by the steep cliffs of the Ahr Hills. From Reimerzhoven the valley sides are dominated by vineyards, especially on the south-facing slopes north of the river, particularly around the villages of Mayschoß, Rech, Dernau and Marienthal. The last narrow point in the Ahr valley occurs below the Bunte Kuh ("coloured cow"), a rock formation that almost reaches the river and leaves little room for road and railway. In Walporzheim, the valley widens abruptly, and the Ahr passes through the county town of Bad Neuenahr. In Heimersheim, the vineyards end. The valley floor between Bad Bodendorf on the northern side and Sinzig on a terrace in the south is dominated by agriculture and fruit and vegetable growing.

The mouth of the Ahr lies on the plain of the Golden Mile, between the Remagen district of Kripp and the town of Sinzig at a height of about 53 m above NHN. Since being re-naturalised (from 1979, see aerial photographs) it has been one of the few natural river mouths on the Rhine and is under protection.

Ahr - Source, Valley, Mouth

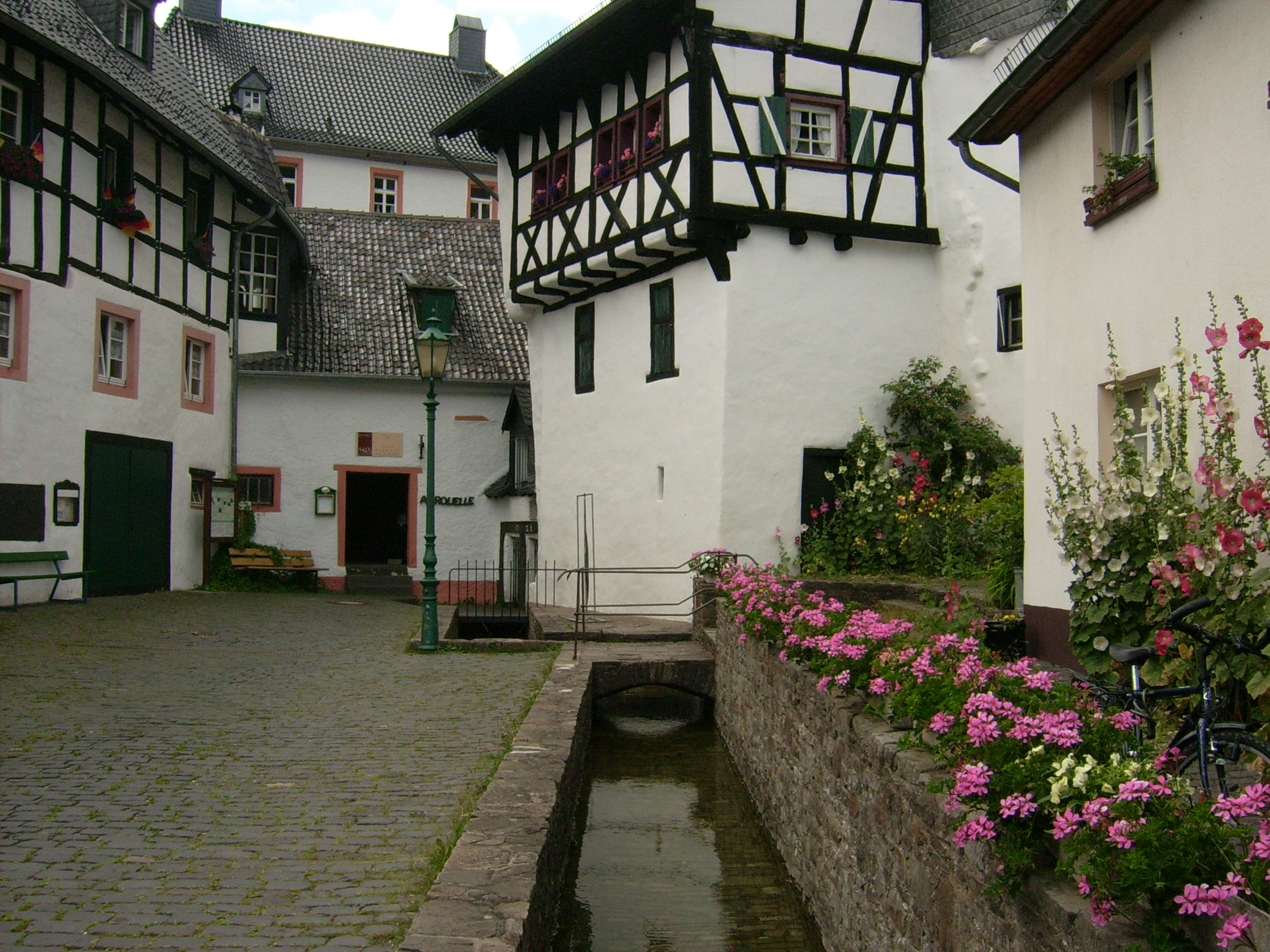
Source of the Ahr (in front of the head) in Blankenheim

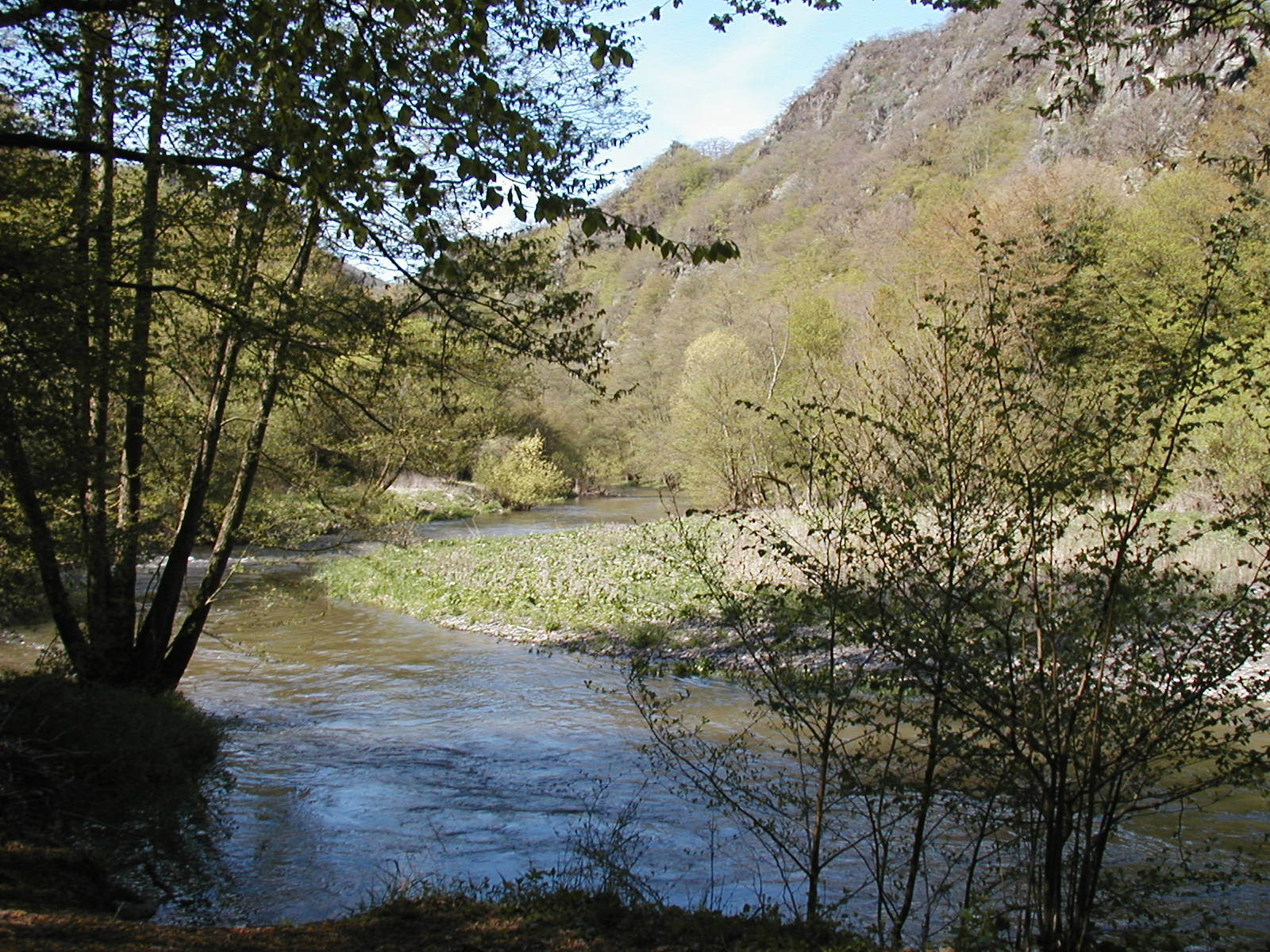
The middle Ahr below Altenahr with the rock formation of Langfig

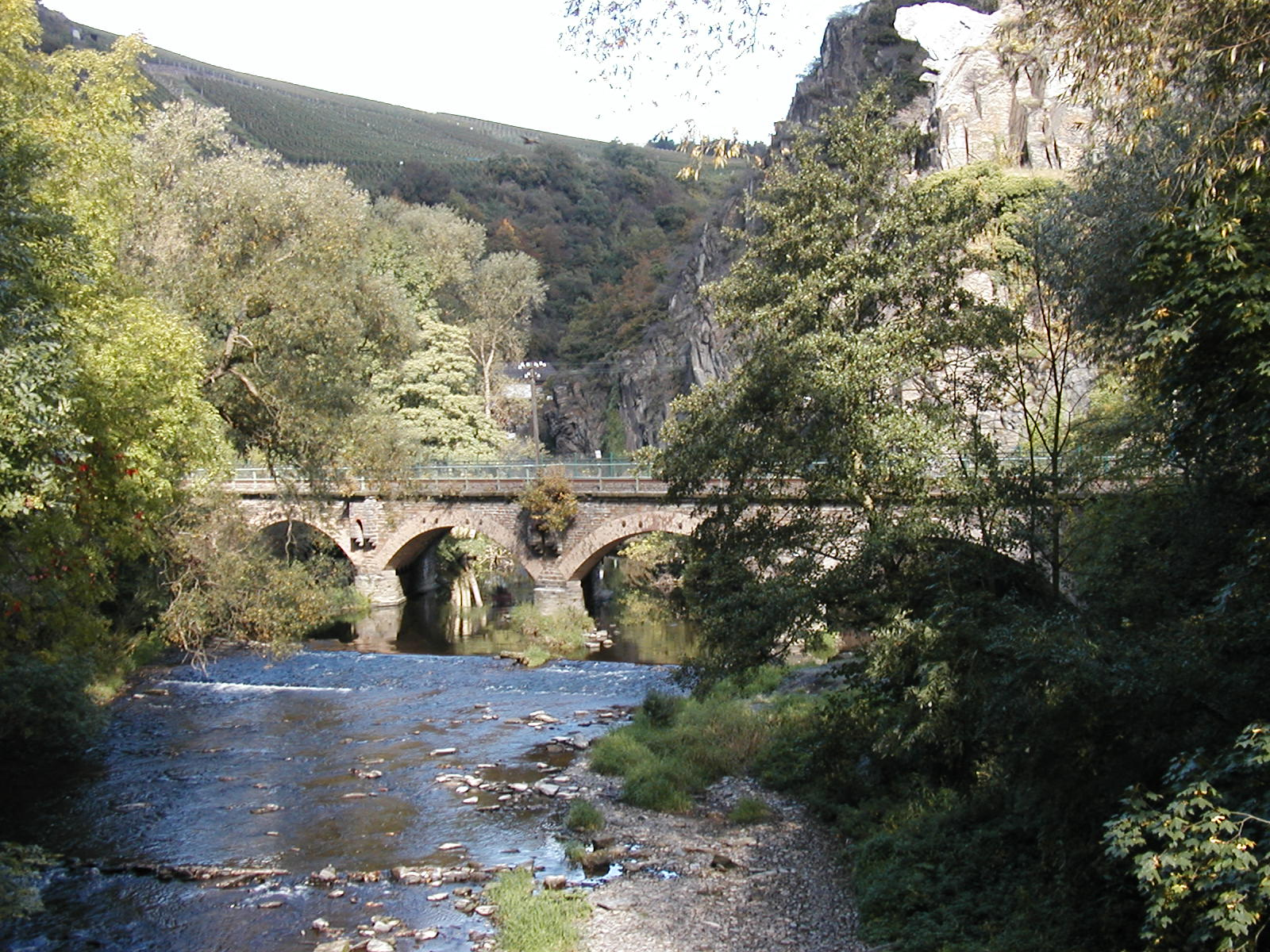
The Ahr by the Bunte Kuh rock formation at Walporzheim

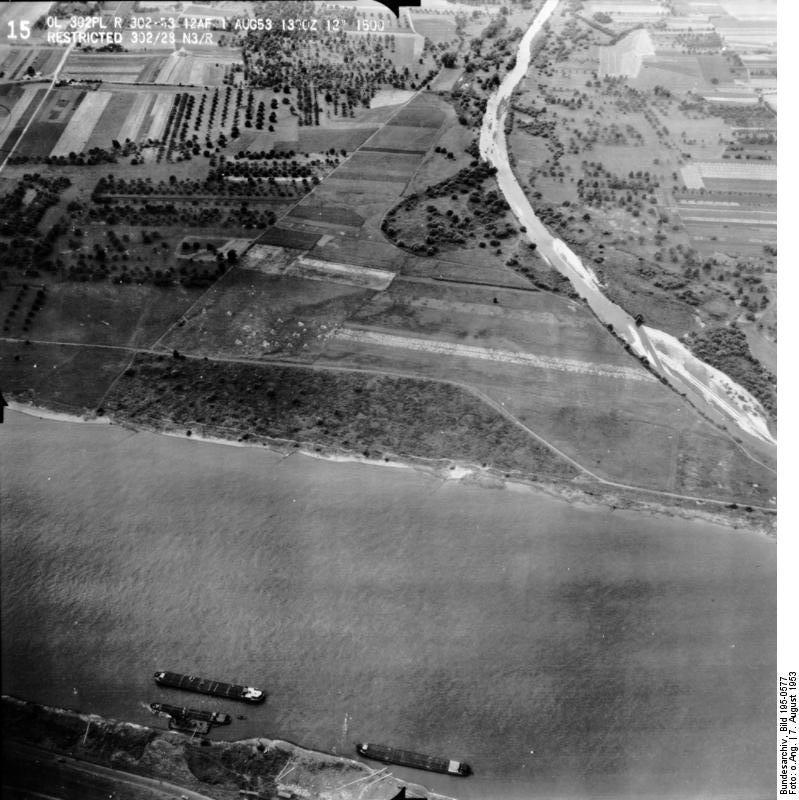
The mouth of the Ahr on the Rhine before re-naturalisation (1957)

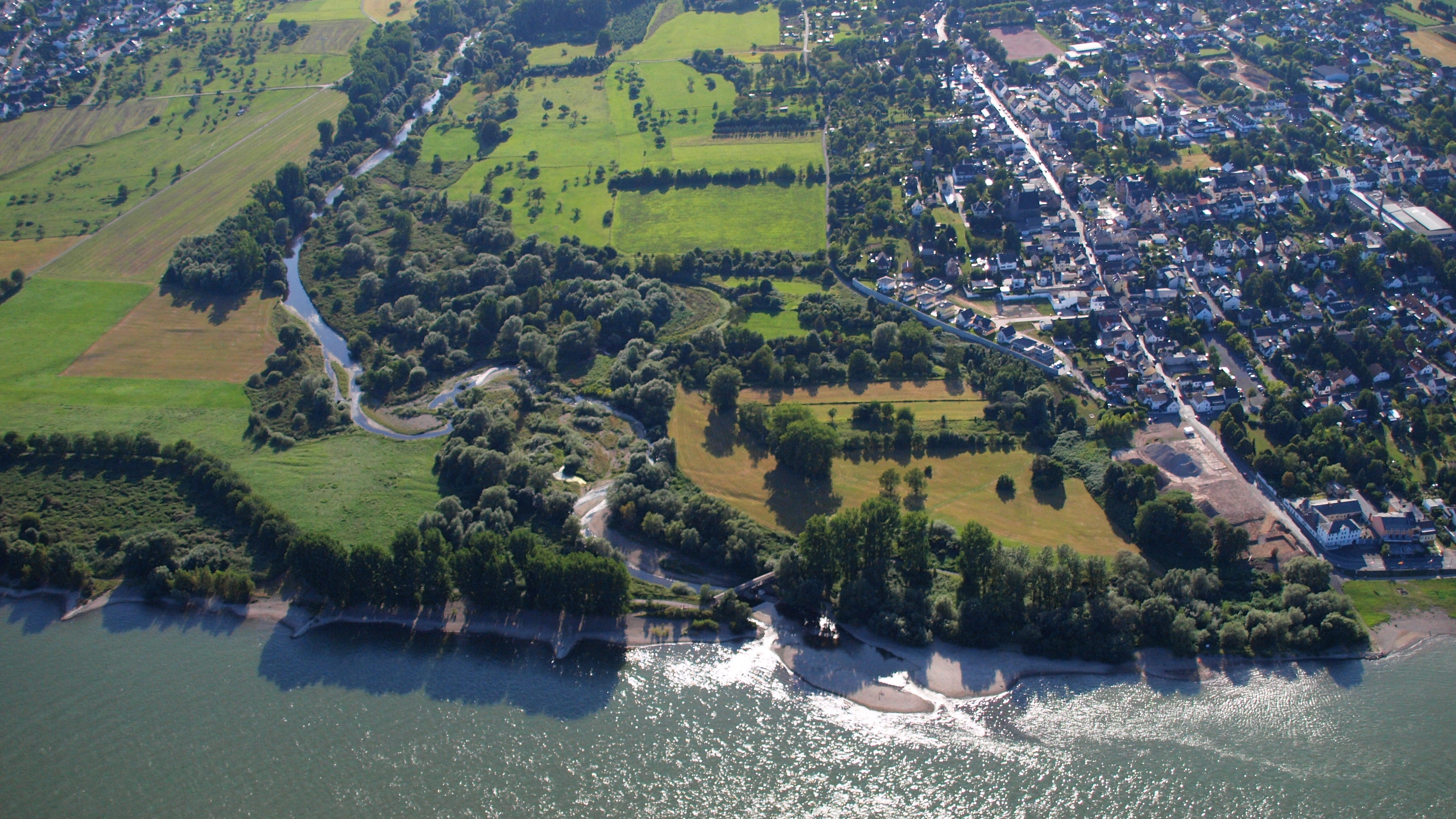
The mouth of the Ahr after re-naturalisation. Right: this village of Kripp

== Tributaries ==
The tributaries of the Ahr include (in upstream order):

Name	Waterbody No. (GKZ)	Length (km)	Direction	Confluence at km	Place	Remarks
Stegbach	27181112	2.2	right	84.9	Blankenheim	
Mülheimer Bach	2718112	4.5	left	83.1		
Nonnenbach	271812	7.0	right	82.5		
Reetzer Bach	2718132	3.6	left	80.5	Reetz	
Schaafbach	271814	11.4	right	79.2		headstream: Eichholzbach
Lampertsbach	271816	9.5	right	75.7	Dollendorf	headstream: Frömmelsbach
Fuhrbach	2718172	5.3	right	74.6	Ahrhütte	
Mühlenbach	271818	7.1	left	74.0	Ahrhütte	headstream: Weilerbach
Michelsbach	2718192	8.3	right	73.2		
Aulbach	2718194	5.1	left	72.9		
Willemsbach	27181992	1.4	right	71.1	Uedelhoven	
Göttersbach	27181994	1.0	right	70.7	Ahrdorf	
Ahbach	27182	14.9	right	68.8	Ahrdorf	
Trierbach	27184	25.3	right	64.2	Müsch	
Huhnenbach	271852	4.3	left	61.1	Antweiler	
Limbach	2718532	3.9	right	60.3	Antweiler	
Eichenbach	2718534	6.9	left	58.7		headstream: Hirzenflosseifen
Laufenbach	2718536	2.8	right	55.5	Fuchshofen	
Dreisbach	271854	10.0	left	55.4	Fuchshofen	
Armuthsbach	271856	18.4	left	52.0	Schuld	
Holzseifen	2718574	1.0	left	47.9	Schuld	
Atzenbach	2718576	2.5	left	47.5		
Lückenbach	271858	5.7	right	45.3	Insul	
Adenauerbach	27186	15.7	right	44.7	Dümpelfeld	
Ommelbach	2718712	1.8	right	43.6	Dümpelfeld	
Liersbach	271872	14.5	left	42.8	Liers	
Kesselinger Bach	271874	14.1	right	95.0	Ahrbrück	
Steinbach	271876	2.5	left	38.3	Ahrbrück	
Stream from Schorling	271878	2.5	left	38.2	Ahrbrück	
Sahrbach	27188	15.3	left	34.0	Kreuzberg	
Vischelbach	271892	10.5	left	33.9	Kreuzberg	
Stream from Burtscheiderberg (Roßbach)	2718932	2.2	left	31.5	Altenahr	
Stream from Sonnenheck (Junge Berren)	2718934	1.8	right	22.0	Rech	
Nollbach (Donnenbach)	271894	1.8	right	21.9	Rech	
Kratzenbach	27189512	2.1	left	18.3	Dernau	
Geusbach	2718952	2.4	right	16.8	Walporzheim	
Wingsbach	271896	4.5	right	15.1	Ahrweiler	
Mühlenteichgraben	27189712	1.0	left	14.5	Bad Neuenahr	
Bachemer Bach	2718972	7.0	right	12.9	Bad Neuenahr	
Fuchsbach	2718974	4.5	left	11.4	Bad Neuenahr	
Mühlenteich	27189752	1.2	right	9.6	Bad Neuenahr	
Idienbach	2718976	5.3	right	9.2	Heimersheim	
Leimersdorfer Bach	271898	8.5	left	8.7	Heppingen	
Lohrsdorfer Bach	2718992	2.5	left	7.0	Lohrsdorf	
Hellenbach	2718996	7.7	right	3.1	Sinzig	
Harbach	2718998	9.9	left	2.5	Sinzig	

Tributaries with a length of over 7 km (from source to mouth): Left tributaries are in dark blue; right tributaries in light blue.

== Viticulture ==
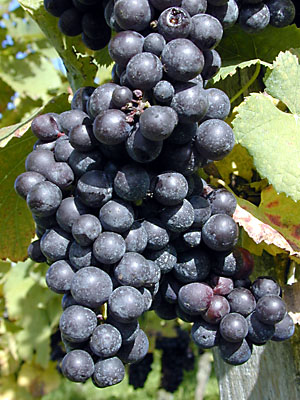
Spätburgunder grapes

The Ahr is well known for the many vineyards that grace the hillsides downstream of the village of Altenahr. The small Ahr wine region is nevertheless the largest contiguous red wine-growing area in Germany, noted especially for wines made from the Spätburgunder (Pinot noir) grape. The Red Wine Trail runs through the southern slopes of the lower Ahr Valley, passing inter alia the former government bunker.

== See also ==
- Golden Mile (Rhineland-Palatinate), the fertile plain at the mouth of the Ahr
- List of rivers of Rhineland-Palatinate
- List of rivers of North Rhine-Westphalia
