= Blankenheim, North Rhine-Westphalia =

Blankenheim
- Municipality
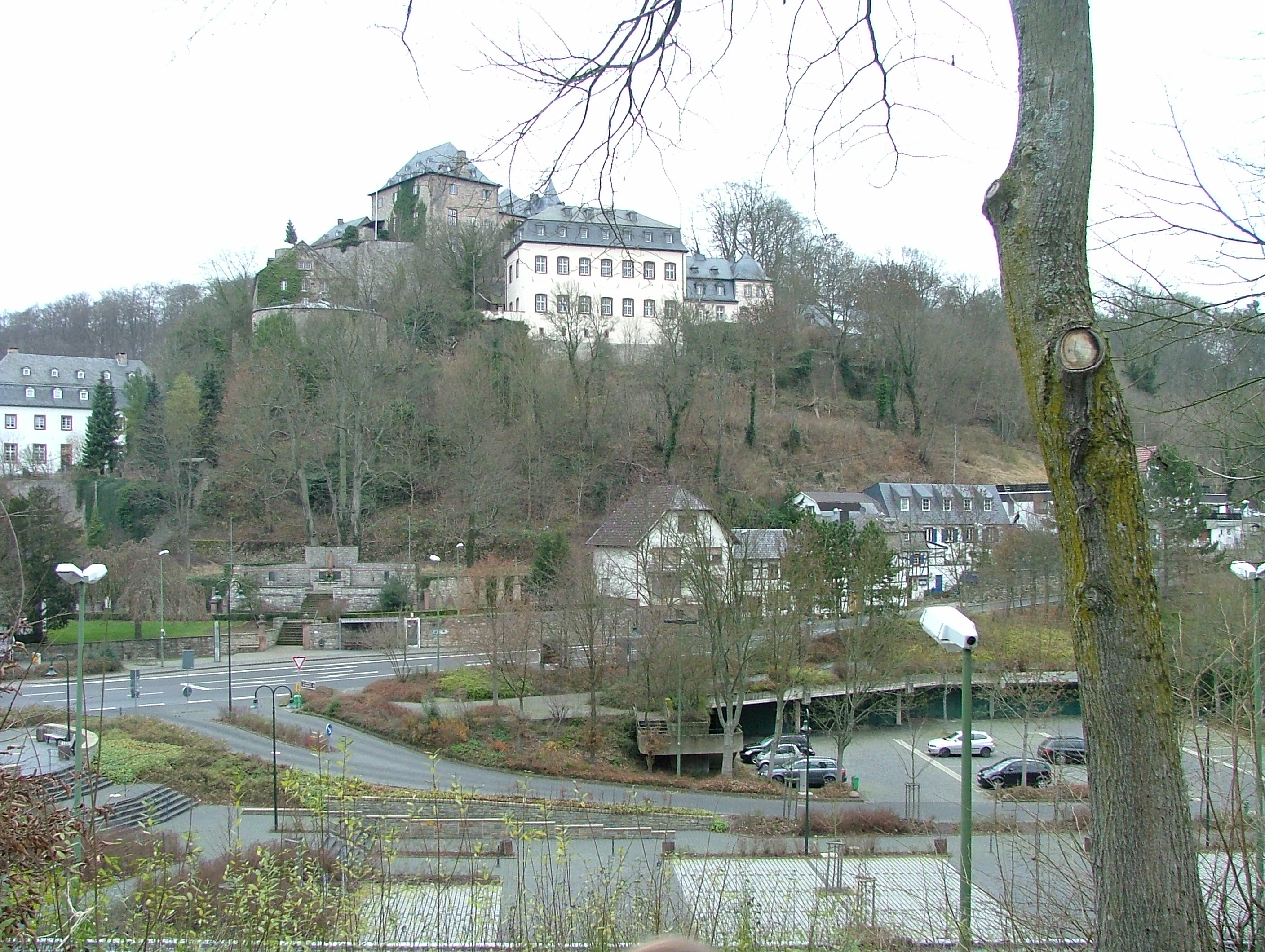
- Blankenheim Castle

- Coat of arms

- Location of Blankenheim within Euskirchen district
- Interactive map of Blankenheim
- Location within Germany Location within North Rhine-Westphalia
- Coordinates: 50°26′N 06°39′E
- Country: Germany
- State: North Rhine-Westphalia
- Admin. region: Cologne
- District: Euskirchen
- Founded: 721
- Subdivisions: 17

Government
  - Mayor (2025–30): Jennifer Meuren

Area
  - Total: 148.62 km^{2} (57.38 sq mi)
- Elevation: 455 m (1,493 ft)

Population (2025-12-31)
  - Total: 8,382
  - Density: 56.40/km^{2} (146.1/sq mi)
- Time zone: UTC+01:00 (CET)
  - Summer (DST): UTC+02:00 (CEST)
- Postal codes: 53945
- Dialling codes: 02449 & 02697
- Vehicle registration: EU
- Website: www.blankenheim-ahr.de

Blankenheim (German pronunciation: [ˈblaŋkn̩haɪm]) is a municipality in the district of Euskirchen in the state of North Rhine-Westphalia, Germany.

== Geography ==
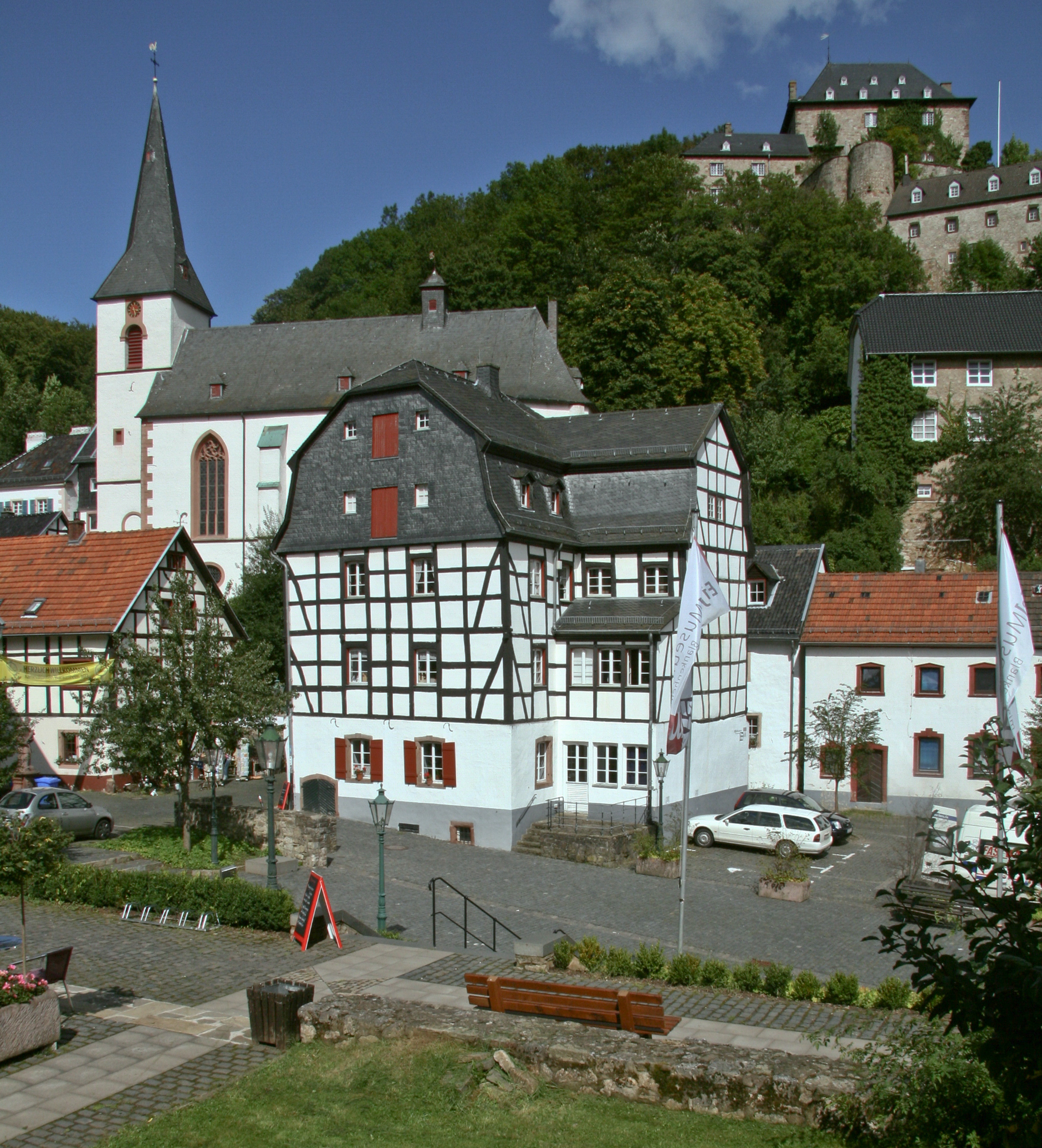
Parish church St. Mariä Himmelfahrt and Blankenheim Castle

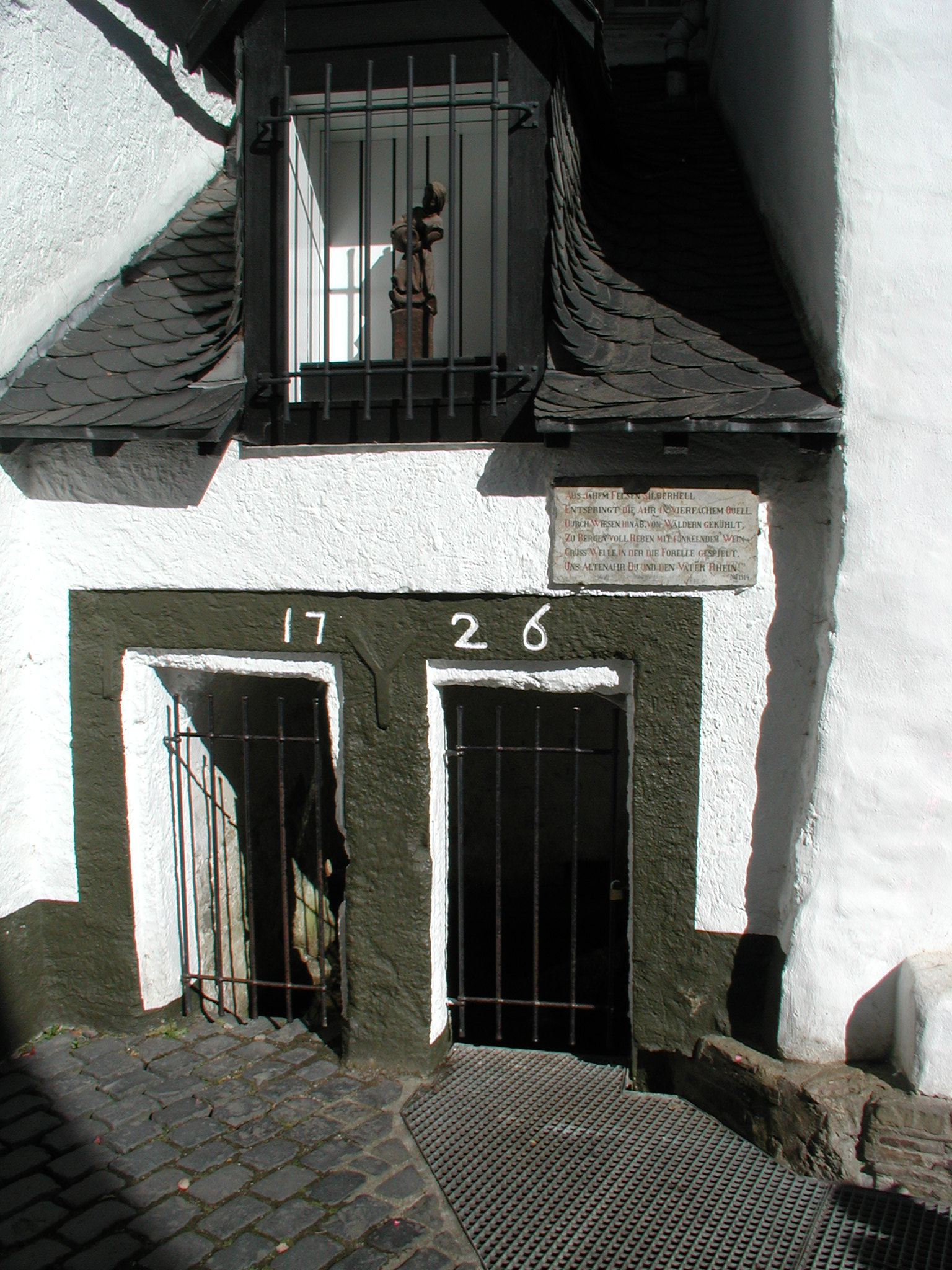
Source of the Ahr in Blankenheim

Blankenheim is located in the Eifel hills, approximately 27 km (17 mi) south-west of Euskirchen. The river Ahr has its source in the centre of Blankenheim, in the cellar of a half timbered house.

== History ==
In the year 721, Blankenheim is mentioned for the first time as "Blancio" in a document. Today, the municipality is called in Eifel dialect as "Blangem" and has got a long carnival tradition.

== Population ==
Historical population

Year	Pop.	±% p.a.
1965	7,247	—
1970	7,156	−0.25%
1975	7,379	+0.62%
1980	7,443	+0.17%
1985	7,385	−0.16%
1990	7,784	+1.06%
1995	8,292	+1.27%

Year	Pop.	±% p.a.
2000	8,776	+1.14%
2005	8,668	−0.25%
2010	8,294	−0.88%
2015	8,471	+0.42%
2020	8,268	−0.48%
2025	8,382	+0.27%

Source: Landesdatabank Nordrhein-Westfalen

== Politics ==
The current mayor of Blankenheim is Jennifer Meuren, an independent, who has been serving as mayor since 2020. In the 2025 local elections she was the only candidate and was reelected with 86.7% of the vote.

=== City council ===
After the 2025 local elections, the Blankenheim city council is composed as follows:

Party	Votes	%	+/-	Seats	+/-
Christian Democratic Union (CDU)	2,023	44.5	▲0.7	11	▲1
Social Democratic Party (SPD)	1,261	27.8	▲7.3	7	▲2
Independent Voters' Association Blankenheim (UWV)	490	10.8	▼5.1	3	▼1
Free Democratic Party (FDP)	460	10.1	▼1.6	3	±0
Alliance 90/The Greens (Grüne)	310	6.8	▼1.3	2	±0
Valid votes	4,544	97.4			
Invalid votes	123	2.6			
Total	4,667	100.0		26	±0
Electorate/voter turnout	6,929	67.4			
Source: Municipality of Blankenheim

== See also ==
- Blankenheim Castle
