= List of castles in North Rhine-Westphalia =

This list encompasses castles described in German as Burg (castle), Festung (fort/fortress), Schloss (manor house, palace, country house or stately home) and Palais/Palast (palace). Many German castles after the Middle Ages were mainly built as royal or ducal palaces rather than as a fortified building.

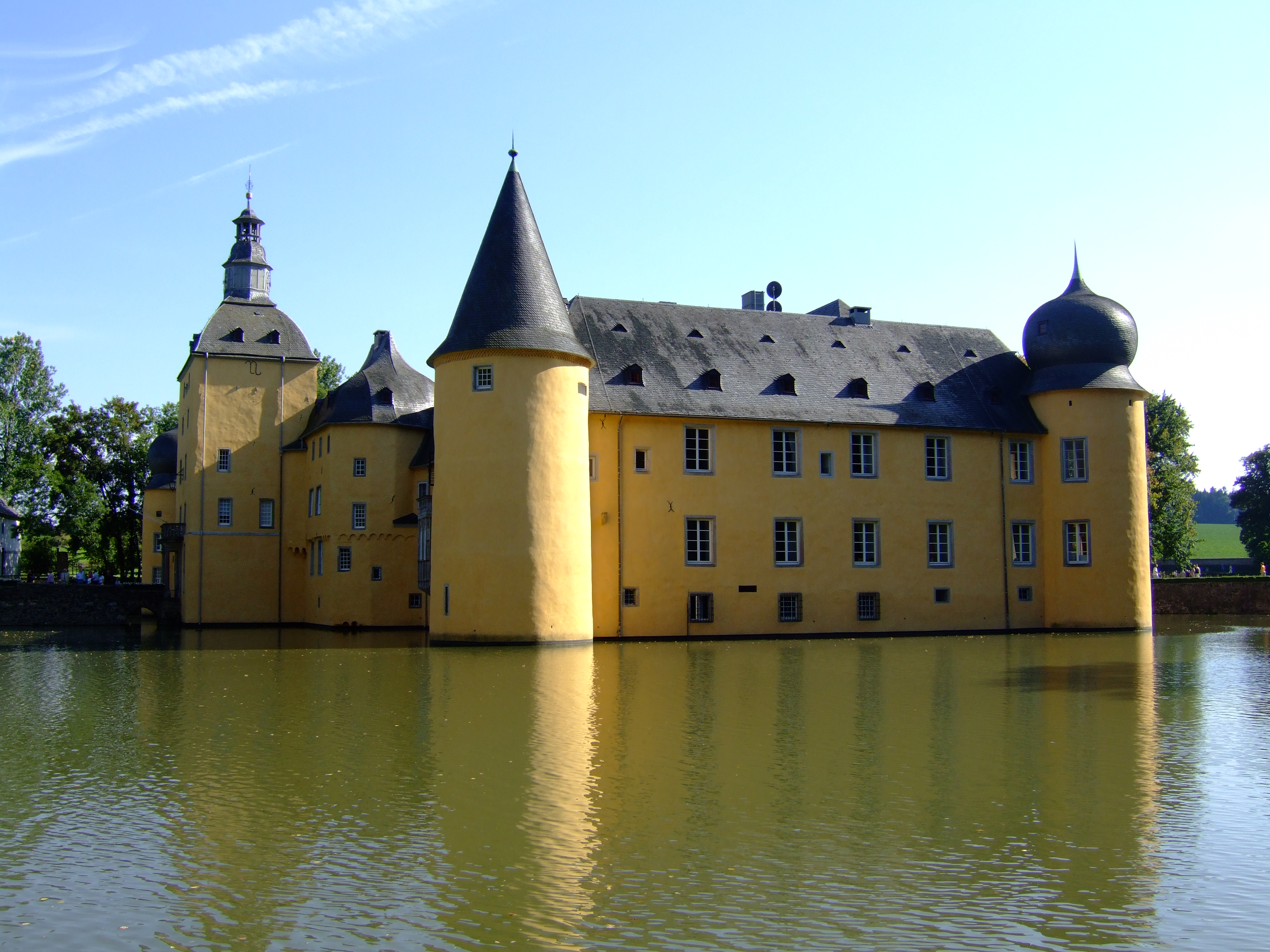
Gudenau Castle

== Castles ==
- Alfter Castle, Alfter
- Schloss Allner, Hennef
- Altena Castle, Altena
- Arloff Castle, Arloff
- Baesweiler Castle, Baesweiler
- Schloss Berleburg, Bad Berleburg
- Godesburg Festung, Bad Godesberg
- Alte Burg, Bad Münstereifel
- Moyland Castle, Bedburg-Hau
- Bevergern Castle, Bevergern
- Sparrenburg Castle, Bielefeld
- Bilstein Castle, Lennestadt
- Blankenheim Castle, Blankenheim
- Palais Schaumburg, Bonn
- Gemen Castle, Borken, North Rhine-Westphalia
- Schloss Beck, Bottrop
- Brüggen Castle, Brüggen
- Augustusburg and Falkenlust Palaces, Brühl
- Schloss Bladenhorst, Castrop-Rauxel
- Schloss Detmold, Detmold
- Haus Dellwig, Dortmund
- Hohensyburg, Dortmund
- Husen Castle, Dortmund
- Wasserschloss Haus Bodelschwingh, Dortmund
- Schloss Benrath, Düsseldorf
- Düsseldorfer Schloss
- Mickeln House, Düsseldorf
- Ehreshoven Castle, Engelskirchen
- Kambach Castle, Eschweiler
- Roethgen Castle, Eschweiler
- Palant Castle, Eschweiler
- Kinzweiler Castle, Eschweiler
- Eschweiler Castle, Eschweiler
- Nothberg Castle, Eschweiler
- Weisweiler Castle, Eschweiler
- Schloss Baldeney, Essen
- Schloss Borbeck, Essen
- Schloss Hugenpoet, Essen
- Schloss Schellenberg, Essen
- Haus Bamenohl, Finnentrop
- Schloss Berge, Gelsenkirchen
- Schloss Horst, Gelsenkirchen
- Mark Castle, Hamm
- Heessen Castle, Hamm
- Blankenstein Castle, Hattingen
- Reifferscheid Castle, Hellenthal
- Klusenstein Castle, Hemer
- Schloss Strünkede, Herne
- Schloss Herten, Herten
- Schloss Westerholt, Herten
- Fürstenberg Castle, Höingen (nr Ense)
- House Opherdicke, Holzwickede
- Hückeswagen Castle, Hückeswagen
- Schloss Drachenburg, Königswinter
- Linn Castle, Krefeld
- Schloss Iggenhausen, Lage
- Holzheim Castle, Langerwehe
- Schloss Brake, Lemgo
- Morsbroich Castle, Leverkusen
- Schloss Neuenhof, Lüdenscheid
- Vischering Castle, Lüdinghausen
- Raesfeld Castle, Borken

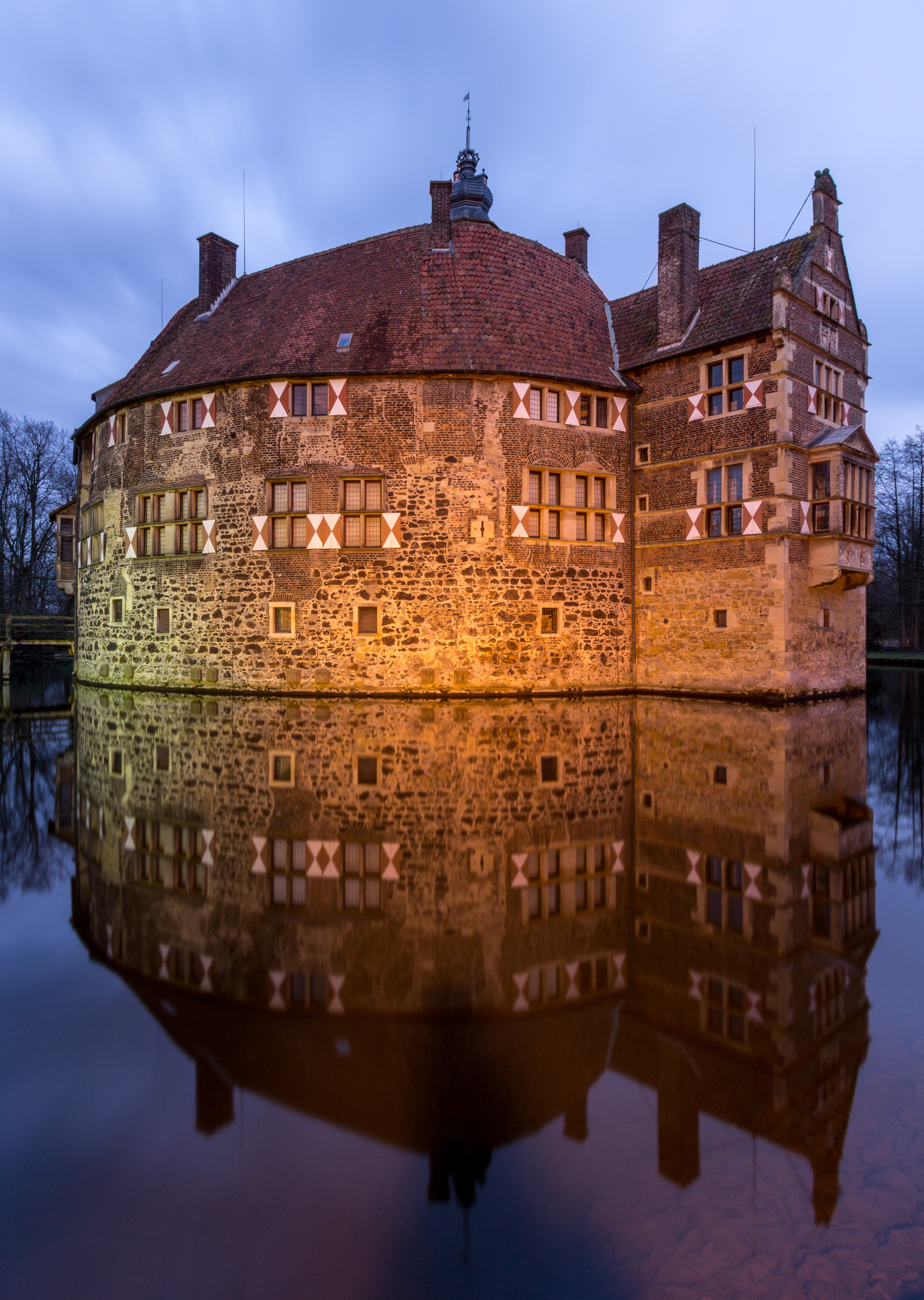
Vischering Castle

- Gimborn Castle, Marienheide
- Schloss Rheydt, Mönchengladbach
- Schloss Wickrath, Mönchengladbach
- Monschau Castle, Monschau
- Schloss Broich, Mülheim
- Schloss Styrum, Mülheim
- Castle of Münster, Münster
- Schloss Münster, Münster
- Schloss Nörvenich, formerly Gymnicher Burg, Nörvenich
- Krickenbeck Castle, Nettetal
- Schloss Reuschenberg, Neuss
- Homburg Castle, Nümbrecht
- Schloss Nordkirchen, Nordkirchen
- Vondern Castle, Oberhausen
- Kastell Holten, Oberhausen
- Schloss Oberhausen, Oberhausen
- Wewelsburg, near Paderborn
- Schloss Darfeld, Rosendahl
- Ordensburg Vogelsang, Schleiden
- Schloss Cappenberg, Selm
- Schloss Burg near Solingen
- Stolberg Castle, Stolberg (Rhineland)
- Burg Tecklenburg, Tecklenburg
- Schloss Hardenberg, Velbert
- Münchhausen Castle, Wachtberg
- Wasserburg Adendorf, Wachtberg
- Gudenau Castle, Wachtberg
- Odenhausen Castle, Wachtberg
- Hardenstein Castle, Witten
- Gödersheim Castle, Wollersheim
- Zülpich Castle, Zülpich

== See also ==
- List of castles
- List of castles in Germany
