= Holzheim Castle =

Holzheim Castle may refer to the following castles in Germany:

- Holzheim Castle (Haunetal), county of Hersfeld-Rotenburg, Hesse
- Holzheim Castle (Langerwehe), county of Düren, North Rhine-Westphalia

== See also ==
- Holzheim House (Schloss Holzheim), a manor house in the municipality of Leonding, Linz-Land, Austria
- Holzheim Hunting Lodge, county of Hersfeld-Rotenburg, Hesse, Germany
