= Bladenhorst Castle =

Coordinates: 51°34′12″N 7°16′47″E

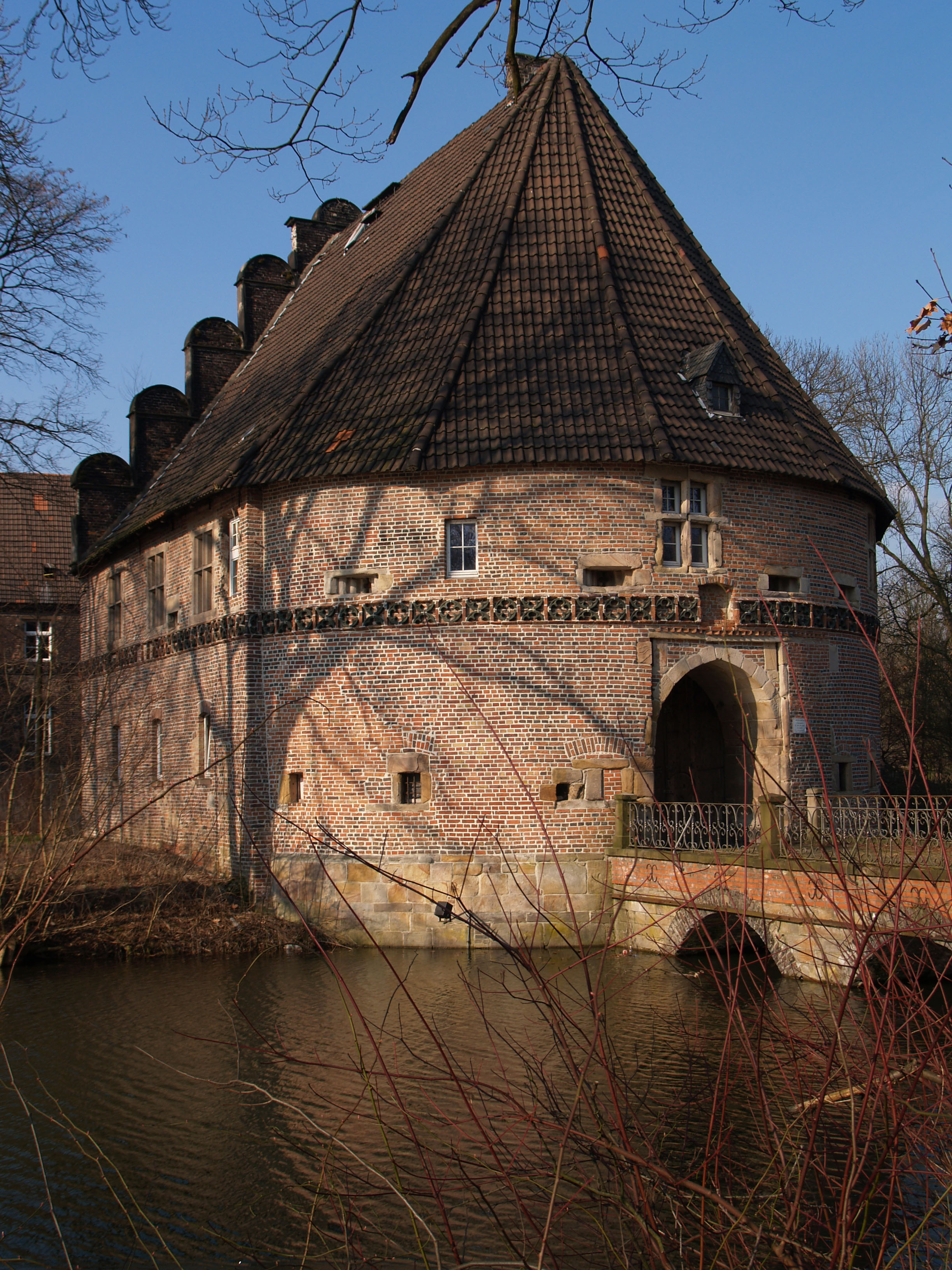
The gatehouse and moat of Bladenhorst Castle

Bladenhorst Castle (German: Schloss Bladenhorst) is a moated castle in the suburbs of the city of Castrop-Rauxel.

== History ==
The castle was first recorded in 1266 as the residence of the lords of Blarnhurst lived there. At the beginning of the 14th century it became the possession of the family of Düngelen.

In 1338, Rötger Düngelen made the castle available to the Duchy of Cleves to use in the event of war.

Through marriage, in 1496 the castle passed to Philip of Viermünden. From 1624 to 1881 it was inherited by the Westphalian noble family of von Romberg.

The structure originally consisted of four wings. The gatehouse is the oldest part of the building, the chapel dates from 1332. The castle as it stands is in the style of the Renaissance - coming from its rebuilding between 1530 and 1584.

In 1926 the castle became the possession of the Klöckner-Werke. Since the 16th of February 2006 the Bank "Sparkasse Vest" became the owner of the castle, having administered it for three years - at auction a sum of 800,000 Euros was paid, much less than the minimum bid of 1.4 million euros, nevertheless the sale was closed since the organisation had already made much investment in the building.

In April 2007, the castle was transferred into the private possession of a person from Dortmund.

The castle is still inhabited, and privately owned, consequently there are no public tours or visits, some parts of the castle are rented out to private individuals.

== Location ==
Bladenhorst Castle lies in the fenlands between the rivers of the Emscher, the Deininghauser Bach, and the Salzbach (a tributary of the Nidda River) - natural conditions which allowed the building of a moat.

At the end of the 19th century a branch canal of the Dortmund-Ems Canal was built in the immediate vicinity of the castle between Heinrichenburg and Herne. Later the Rhine-Herne canal was built to replacing the original, this lies north of the castle.

The character of the land surrounding is mostly damp lowland forest and heath. Numerous ditches drain the area.

== See also ==
- List of castles in North Rhine-Westphalia

== References and notes ==
=== Primary sources ===
- Castle Bladenhorst website schlossbladenhorst.de

=== Literature ===
- Ferdinand Schmidt: Schloß Bladenhorst. Besitzfolge. In: Der Märker. Nr. 1, 1951.
- Wolfram Schmidt: Wo sich Vergangenheit, Gegenwart und Zukunft begegnen. Wasserschloss Bladenhorst - ein kulturhistorisches Denkmal der Stadt Castrop-Rauxel. Castrop-Rauxel: Privatdr. 1999
- Niederhöfer, Kai (2010): Burgen AufRuhr. Unterwegs zu 100 Burgen, Schlössern und Herrensitzen in der Ruhrregion. Edited by Ministerium für Bauen und Verkehr des Landes Nordrhein-Westfalen and Landschaftsverband Westfalen-Lippe. Essen: Klartext Verlag, pp. 314–317
