= Raesfeld Castle =

Water castle in the district of Borken

Coordinates: 51.7637°N 6.8269°E

Raesfeld Castle is a water castle located in Raesfeld, a municipality in the district of Borken in the German state of North Rhine-Westphalia.

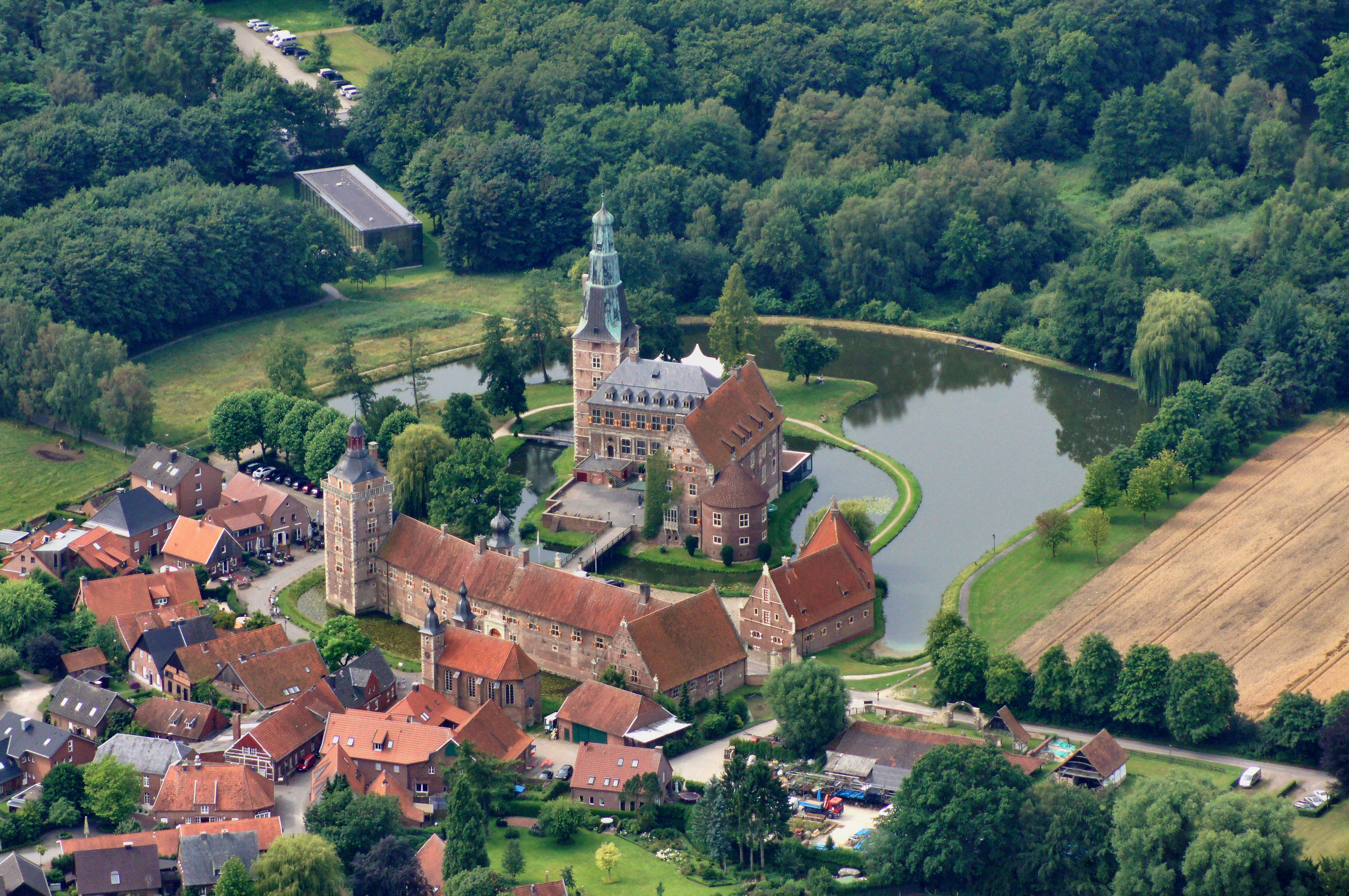
Aerial view of the entire plant

The castle's history dates back to the beginning of the 12th century. At the end of the 16th century, the knight's castle of the Lords of Raesfeld came into the possession of the von Velen family. In the middle of the 17th century, Imperial Count Alexander II von Velen had the castle converted into a Renaissance-style residential palace. In the first half of the 18th century, the von Velen family of Raesfeld died out; the castle was only inhabited irregularly and gradually fell into disrepair. At the beginning of the 19th century, parts of the complex were demolished or used as an agricultural estate until the 20th century. After the Second World War, the new owners, the Chambers of Crafts of North Rhine-Westphalia, had it restored. Today, the castle is home to the further education and training facility of the Chambers of Crafts and is used for cultural events and as a restaurant. It has been possible to get married here since 2007.

Of the former four wings of the upper castle, the west wing with its striking stepped tower and the adjoining old building to the north with a rebuilt round tower still stand today. Moats separate the upper castle from the outer castle and the village castle grounds with the castle chapel. The adjoining zoo is one of the few remaining from the Renaissance period. A natural and cultural history exhibition in the modern Information and Visitor Center Tiergarten Schloss Raesfeld does justice to this special position. The zoo is a member of the European Garden Heritage Network.

== Architecture and building history ==
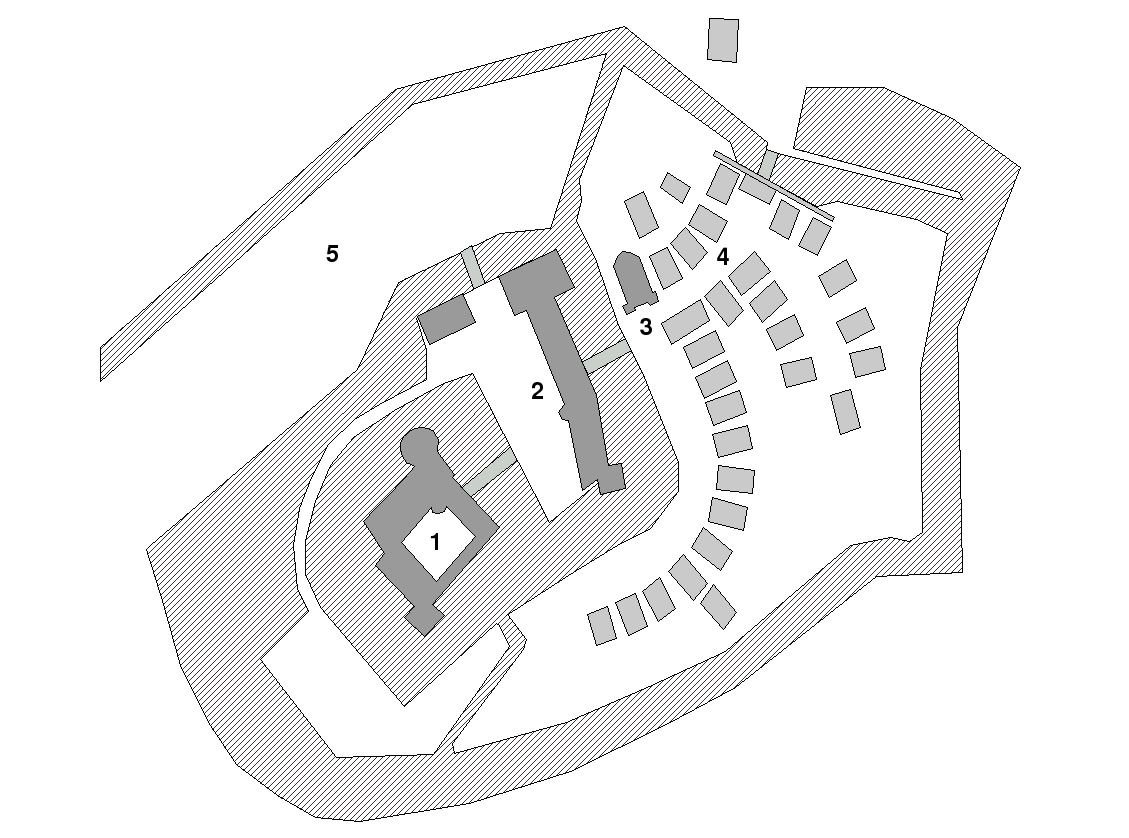
Site plan of the complex around 1729, after P. Friedrich. 1 Upper castle, 2 outer castles, 3 castle chapels, 4 castle grounds, 5 castle parks, shaded area ponds

The castle complex comprises the upper castle, the outer bailey, and the surrounding castle grounds, including the castle chapel. A moat separates the individual parts, originally only connected by drawbridges. The art historian Richard Klapheck wrote: "From the south, the entire complex forms an impressive picture of wonderfully balanced building masses. There is no baroque, violent disturbance despite the overpowering tower verticals." The upper and lower castles are arranged so that the fortissimo of the tones strikes resonate in harmony, creating an overall picture that is imbued with balance and tranquility.

Construction history of the upper castle as an animation, according to Klapheck and Friedrich

The predecessor of the current castle is likely the motte-and-bailey castle known as Burg Kretier, which no longer exists. It was situated in the Große Esch, in the vicinity of the Oude IJssel, approximately three kilometers to the north of the current castle. Excavations conducted in the 1950s and 1960s, in addition to dendrochronological investigations, have revealed that a wooden tower mound castle with moats was constructed on the site around 1117, over a 9th or 10th-century flat settlement. This is likely the settlement of Hrothusfeld (cleared field), which was first mentioned in the Heberegister of Werden Abbey in 889 AD and which gave rise to the name Raesfeld. It is probable that the wooden settlement burned down after 1259, as it was not rebuilt and fell into disrepair.

In contrast, the first stone castle was constructed on the site of the present-day castle. The castle had the shape of an irregular rectangle with edge lengths of 8.60 m and 9.30 m. Portions of the northwest corner of the north wing of the upper castle have been preserved. It is an approximately 1.80 m thick wall constructed of rubble stones and lime mortar with embrasures.

By the end of the 14th century, the castle had been extended to two storeys and reached a length of approximately 30.20 m and a width of 12.40 m. In addition, a square tower was constructed at the southern corner, while a round defense tower was erected on the diagonally opposite corner to the north.

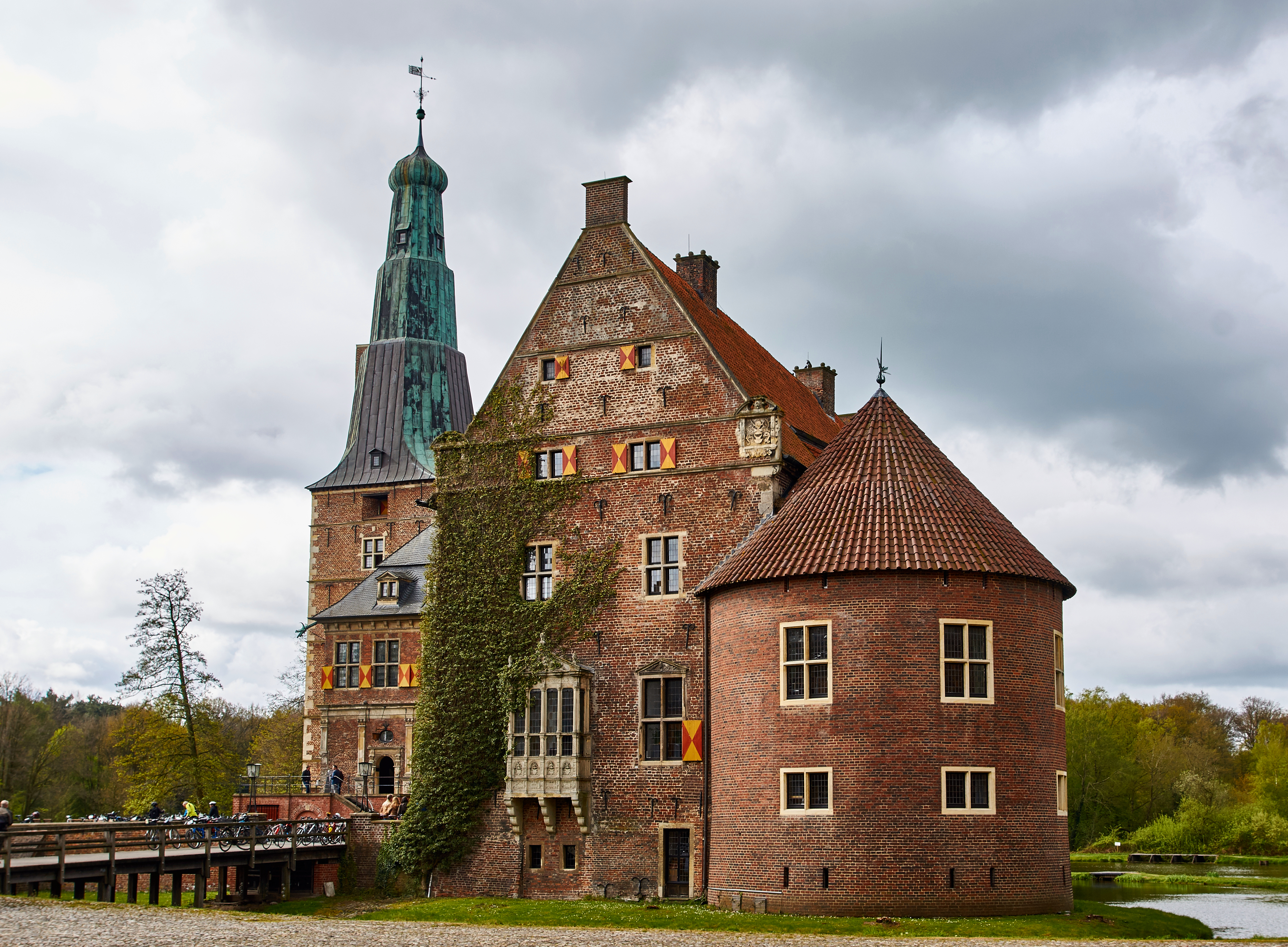
East wall from 1614 with the rebuilt round tower

As a consequence of the destruction of the roof truss by fire in 1597, Alexander I von Velen commissioned the rebuilding of the castle from 1604 to 1606. The master builder Heinrich von Borken was responsible for this undertaking. The round tower, which had been partially destroyed, was rebuilt and given a Welsh dome. The iron number '1606' on the south side of the wing bears witness to the completion of the work. However, the east wall was subsequently rebuilt in 1614 following the destruction caused by a storm. This was the first occasion on which the east side was decorated with ornamentation such as cornice bands and coats of arms on the gable edges. The attached four-part oriel bears the date 1561 and originally came from Velen Castle. The piece was removed around 1900 and remained at Velen Castle until 1933 when it was returned to Raesfeld Castle.

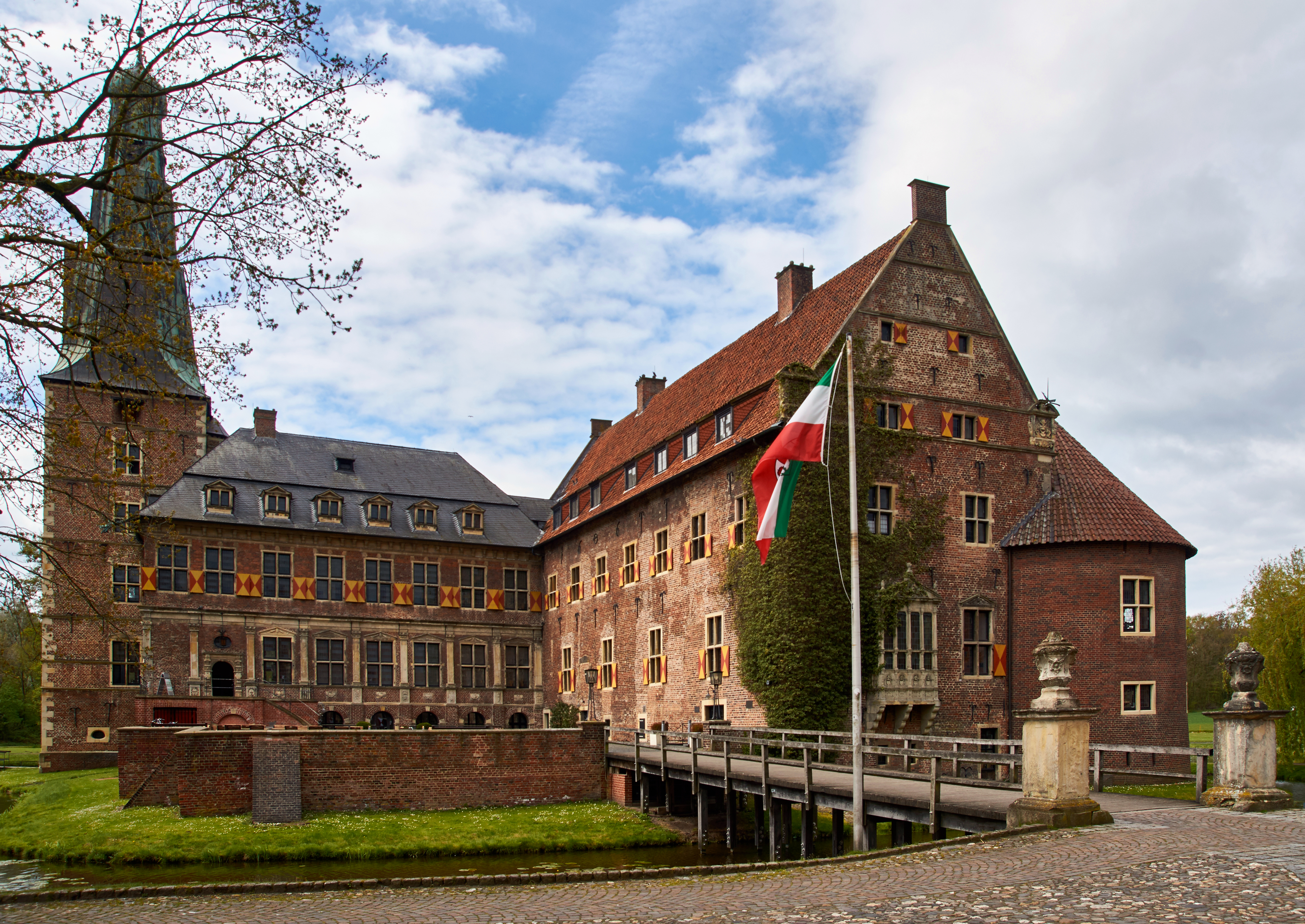
Courtyard side of the upper castle, on the left the west wing (1643–1648) with tower (1645–1653), on the right the north wing from around 1606

This brick edifice was incorporated as the northern wing in the expansion of the residential palace in 1643 by Alexander II von Velen. Three additional wings in the Renaissance style encompassed a rectangular inner courtyard with the old manor house. Two of these wings, the low gallery with the arcade to the inner courtyard and the entrance wing to the upper castle, including a magnificent entrance portal, were demolished in the 19th century. The western residential wing with a gambrel and the tower from this construction period remain on the upper castle. The dominant tower, which is approximately 50 m high, adjoins the west wing to the south. The six-story tower is crowned by a bronze helmet, which tapers steeply upwards and is topped by an onion dome. The unconventional shape with the triple offset truncated pyramids is attributed to the early Baroque period. Klapheck described the tower as a "trumpet blast turned to stone." In 1959, the tower was re-roofed with copper sheets.

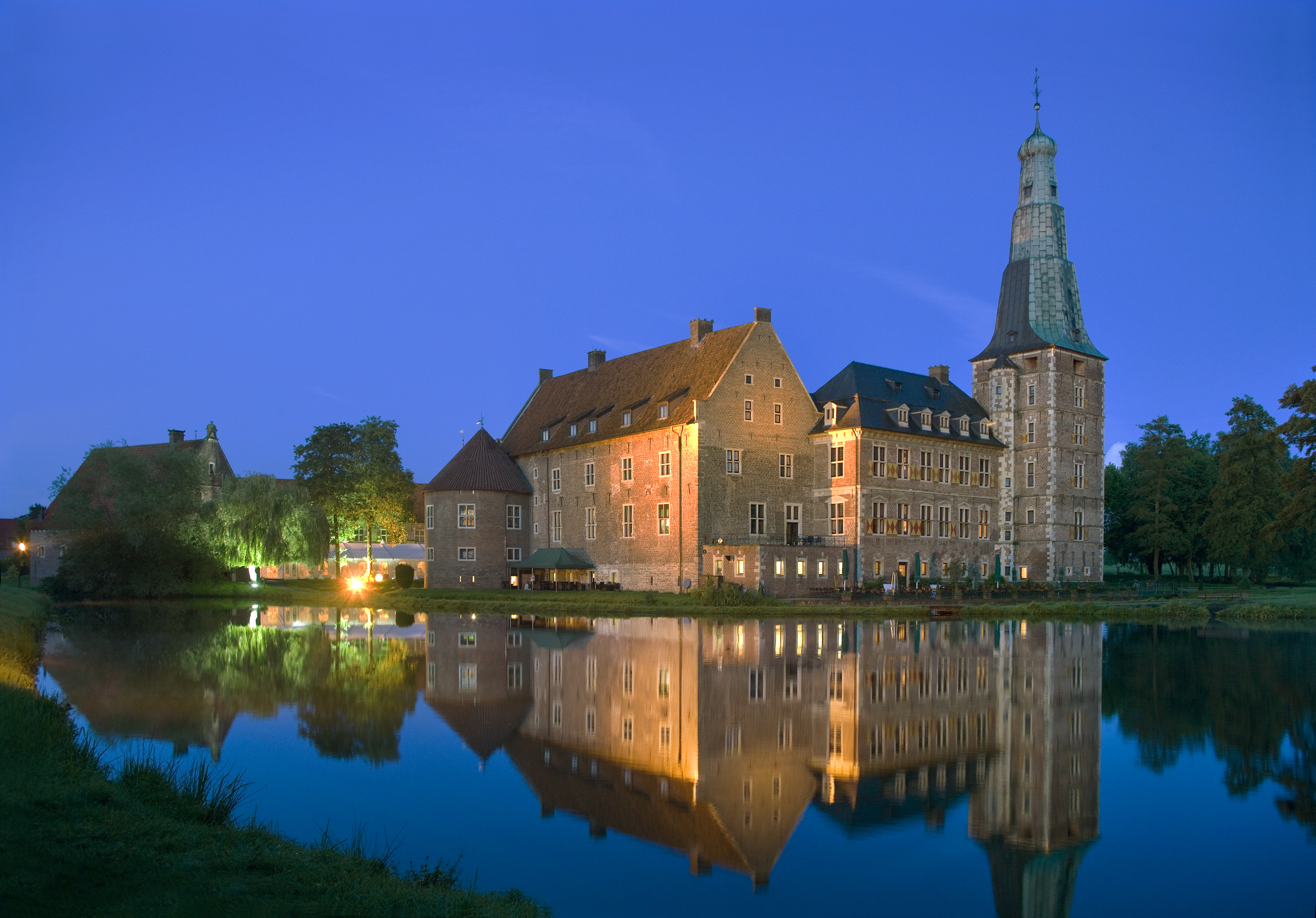
Raesfeld Castle in Münsterland

In 1646, the Capuchin and architect Michael van Gent was engaged as the master builder. Born Jacobus van Pouke near Ghent in 1585, he resided in Münster at the time. Upon his departure for Rome in 1647, Jacob and Johann Schmidt from Roermond continued the work based on a model by van Gent. Remigius Roßkotten was responsible for the stonemasonry work. The outer bailey was completed around 1648, and the upper bailey around 1653, at a total cost of approximately 80,000 Reichstaler.

Bricks were also utilized as the primary construction material for the new wings. Light-colored Baumberg sandstone was employed for the portals, the beams and frames of the windows, the corner ashlars, and the decorative elements. At the beginning of the 20th century, the shutters and portals, which were originally painted red and white, were repainted red and yellow, likely to match the red and gold coat of arms of the von Velen family, which had been painted on the shutters and portals since the 17th century. Before this, the shutters and portals were probably painted blue and white. The roofs were covered with red tiles, and the tower caps with Moselle slate.

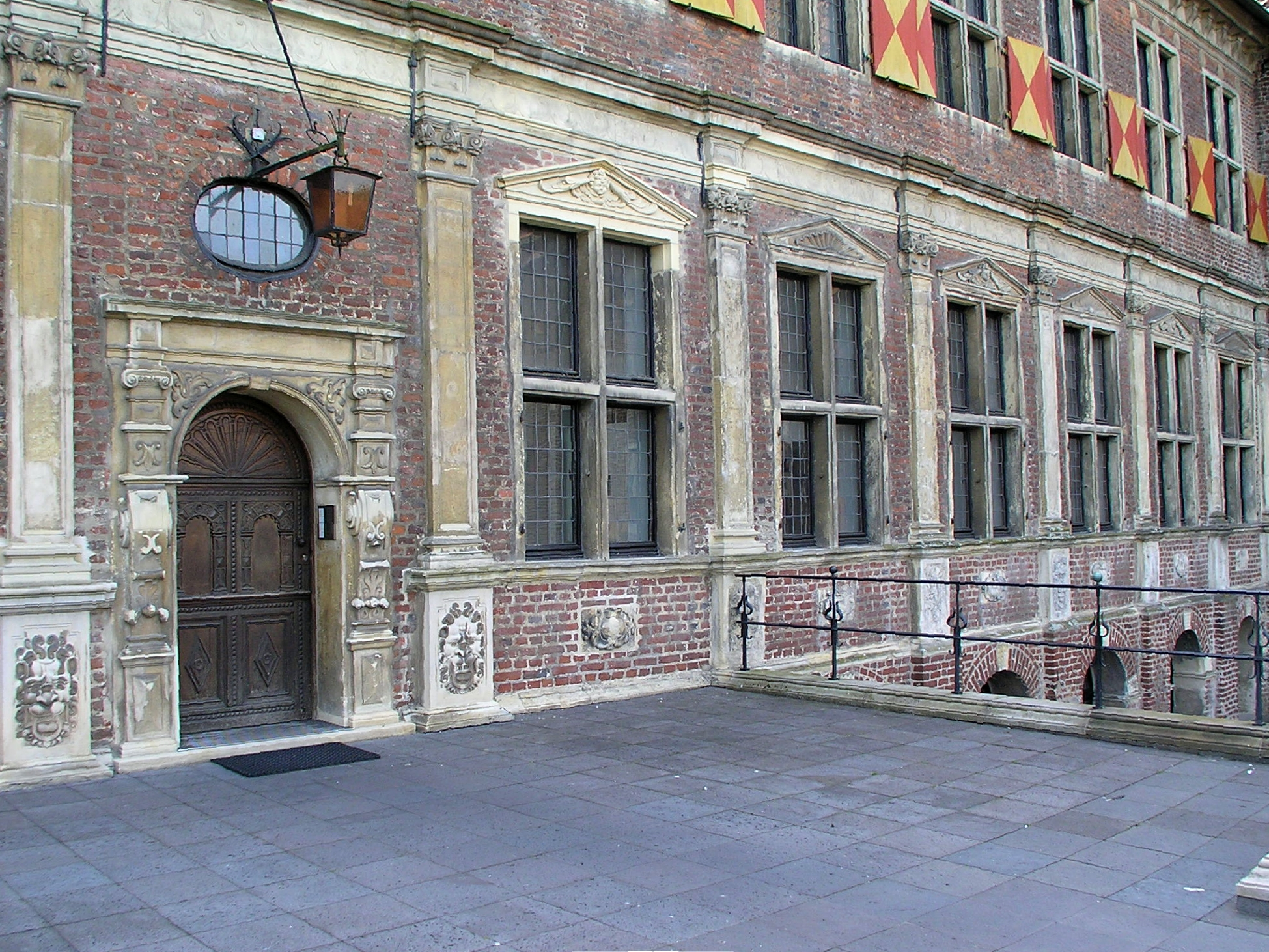
Courtyard side of the west wing

The west wing is divided in height by several cornice bands. Vertically, it is divided by regular stone cross windows. On the first floor, they are crowned by triangular gables with alternating angel heads and shells in the middle. On the second floor, flat double arches with sandstone imposts above the windows relieve a roof cornice supported by corbels. The relieving arches above the windows of the basement are designed as simple semicircular arches, as in the higher floors of the tower, but the imposts and keystones are more elaborately carved sandstone. The courtyard side of the west wing has a representative design: the entrance door to the first floor in the south corner is decorated with rich volute ornamentation and a Oeil-de-boeuf above it. Each of the windows on the first floor is surmounted by a stone cartouche. The Corinthian capitals of the pilasters between the windows are decorated alternately with figures of angels and volutes; they bear a Corinthian-style architrave with volute meanders. The base of the mock columns is formed by sculpted ashlars with lion heads.

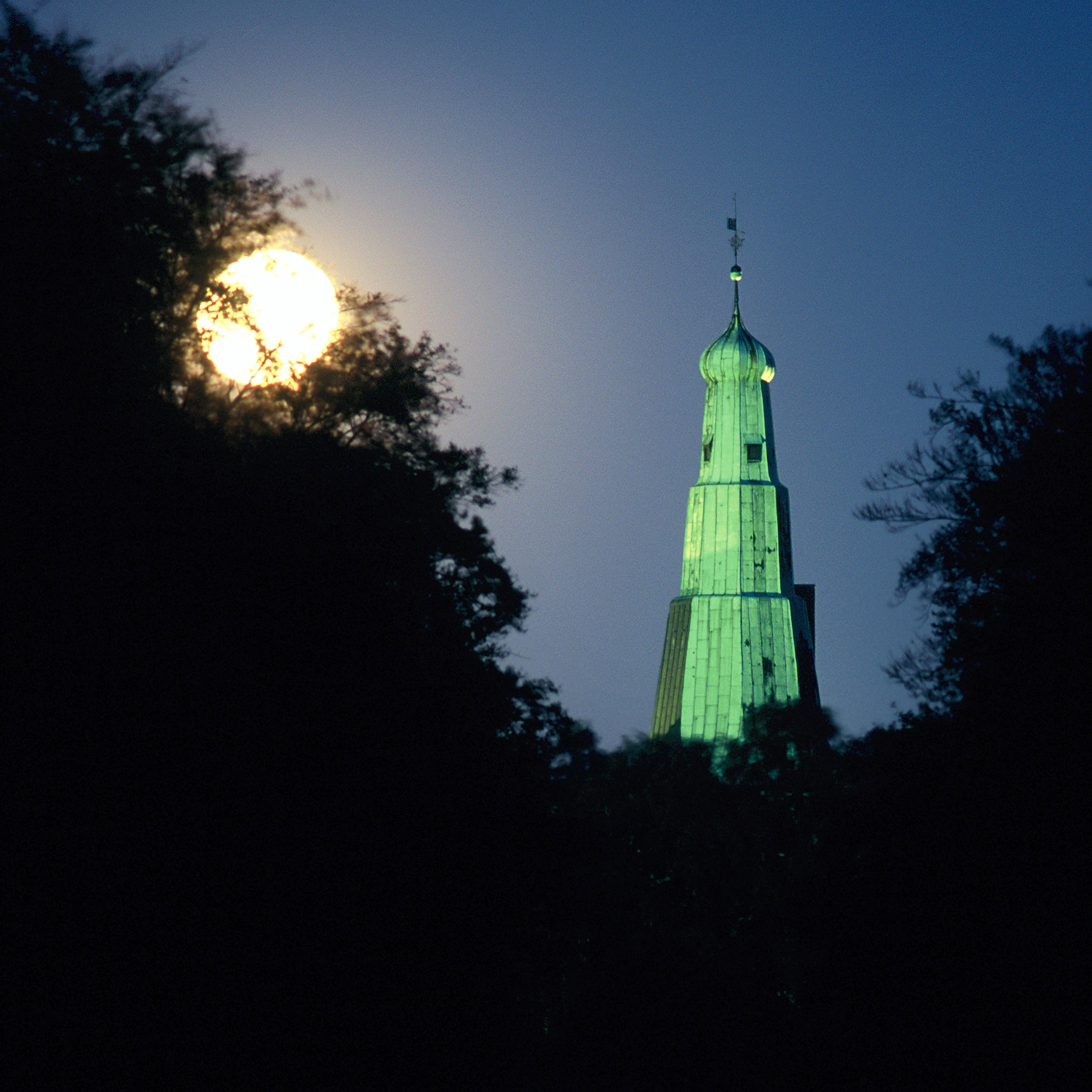
Tower dome of Raesfeld Castle, as a so-called "trumpet blast"

No analogous models for the expansion of Raesfeld Castle can be identified in the surrounding area. Klapheck situates Raesfeld within the context of the castle buildings in the Geldrisch-Limburg Maas valley. He describes Raesfeld as the easternmost manifestation of 17th-century Maas Valley brick architecture, which encompasses the castles of Hoensbroek and Schaesberg near Heerlen and Leerodt Castle near Geilenkirchen. Alexander II was personally acquainted with the lords of the castles, or at the very least the Dutch master builders, due to family connections.

The interior was furnished just as magnificently in the course of the extension. The rooms were adorned with leather wallpaper and tapestries, and the ceilings were decorated with Baroque stucco and paintings. François Walschaerth from Maastricht painted the reveals of the windows in the Knights' Hall of the old manor house with gods and heroes from Greek mythology. Andreas Petersen painted birds and ornaments on the hall doors. Other rooms include the parade room, the count's writing room, the library, the billiard room, the china room, the blue room and the green room. However, hardly any of the furnishings were left when an inspection was carried out in February 1772. Some of the inventory was taken to Velen Castle, while the rest was almost without exception looted or destroyed during the vacancy and occupation. A harpsichord purchased by Alexander II from the famous Flemish workshop Ruckers in 1640 has survived to this day.

Like the portal wing, the stair tower in the inner courtyard and the gallery wing, the round fortified tower dating back to the 14th century was demolished in the 19th century. In 1959, the remains, which were still up to 2.50 m high and 2.70 m thick, were removed down to the oak pile foundations. A three-legged bronze cooking pot ("Grope") and a 17th-century Bartmann jug were found, which were probably walled in when the tower was repaired around 1600. The round tower was rebuilt in 1960.

After falling into serious disrepair in the 18th and 19th centuries, the castle was renovated in 1922 and from 1930 to 1932. From 1950 to 1957, the war damage was repaired and the interior of the castle was redesigned. As part of the renovation, numerous walls were removed and new windows were broken through in the north wing. In 1951, a kitchen wing was added to the northern corner between the west and north wings for the palace restaurant and the staircase to the first floor in the inner courtyard was rebuilt.

=== Outer bailey ===
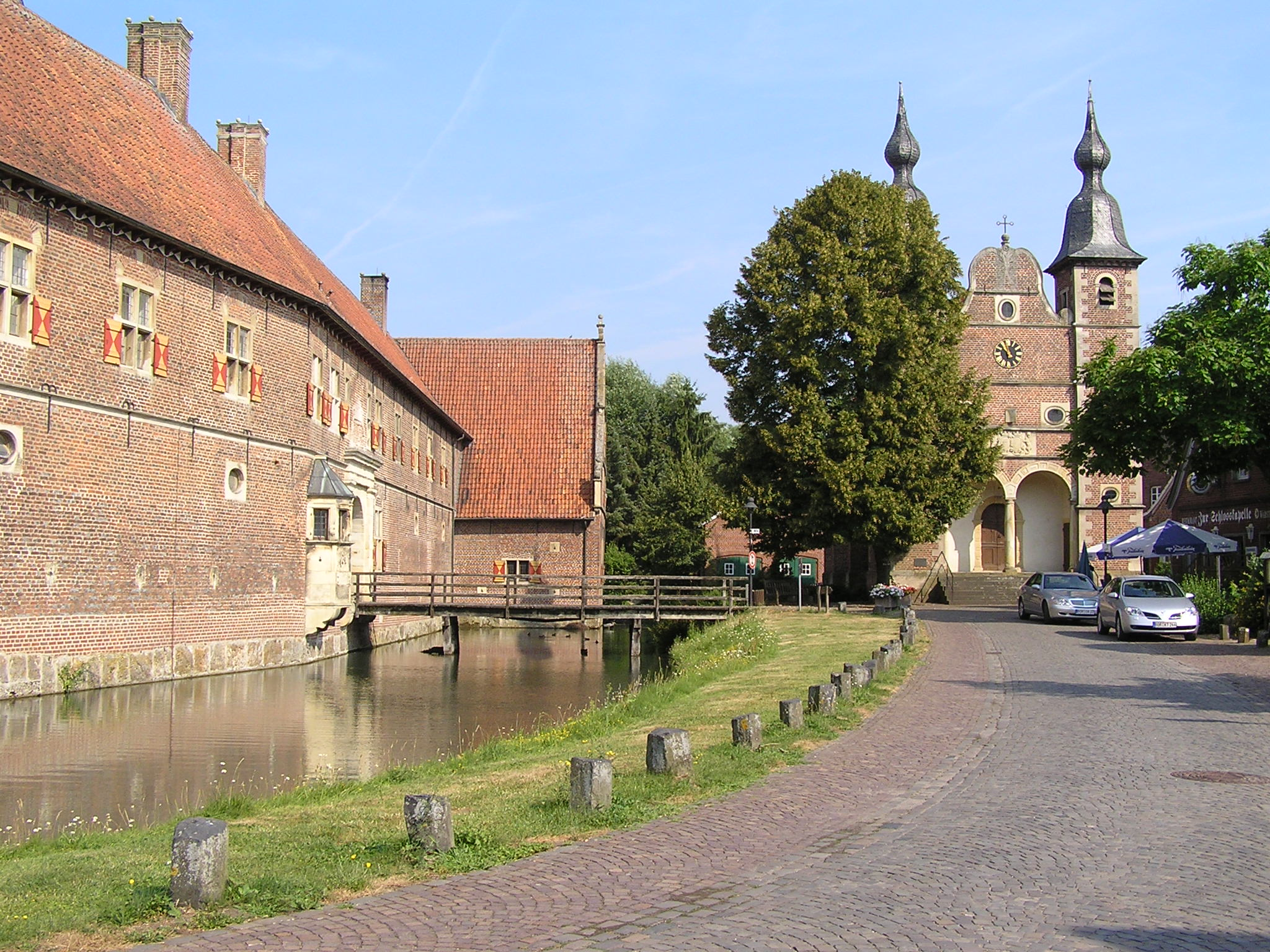
East side of the outer bailey and portal of the castle chapel

The outer bailey is located on a separate island between the freedom and the upper bailey. It housed the administrative and service rooms. The outer bailey was built between 1646 and 1648, and the building on the north side, which is perpendicular to the long outer bailey, has been there since around 1600. It is reminiscent of a Westphalian farmhouse and was also used as a cattle shed and harvest chamber. Next to the gate to the freedom in the middle of the outer bailey is the stair tower on the courtyard side, which leads to the upper floor. To the south, the outer bailey is flanked by the Sterndeuter Tower. The tower is said to have been used by Alexander II of Velen for astrological studies, which explains its name. During the restoration of the Sterndeuter Tower in 2001, evidence was found that the southern part of the outer bailey was also built on older, medieval foundation walls. A carriage house was added to the south in 1923. The outer bailey was completely restored between 1981 and 1983.

The floors are divided by circumferential cornice bands and shields adorn the eaves and ridges of the gables; however, the outer bailey is of a simpler design overall than the west wing of the upper bailey from the same construction phase. The stone cross windows have no triangular pediments or other decorations and the relieving arches are semi-circular with hewn imposts and keystones, as in the upper storeys of the main tower. The top floor of the five-storey Sterndeuter Tower is surrounded by a gallery. A Welsche dome begins above it, which is repeated after a lantern in a reduced form and with an octagonal ground plan. The stair tower also has a Welsche dome. On the courtyard side, a stone plaque was inserted above the gateway in 1649, on which the history of the castle was inscribed in Latin prose. A translation of the inscription can be found in the gateway. Coming from the freedom, there is an octagonal floating bay to the south of the gateway. The arms of alliance of Alexander II von Velen and his wife Alexandrine von Huyn und Gelen, which can now be seen in the exhibition at the visitor and information center, originally hung above the entrance.

=== Freedom and chapel ===
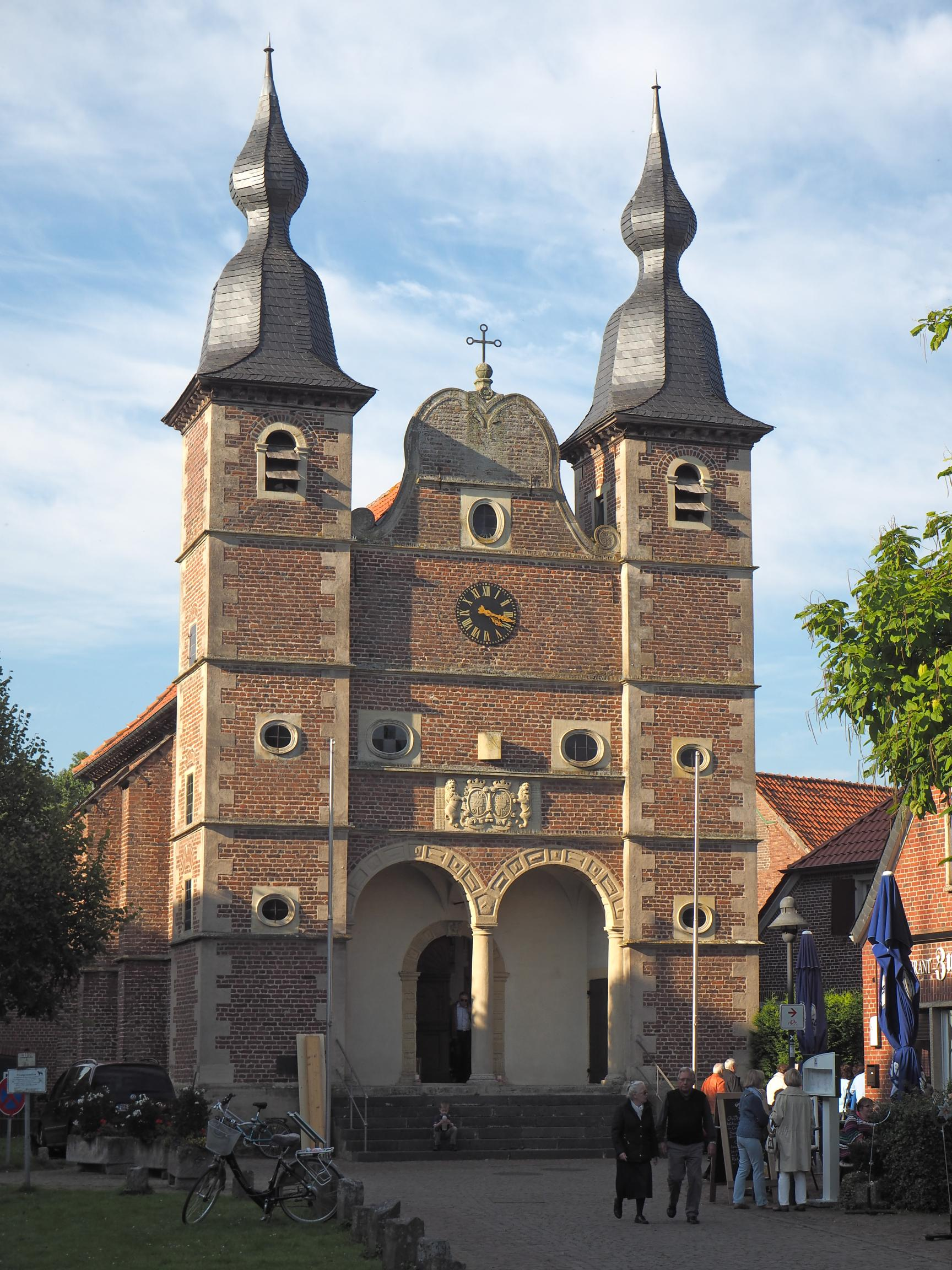
Raesfeld Castle Chapel

A rampart to the north and east and a gatehouse with a wall protected the village's freedom. Around 1729, there were around 30 houses in which the courtiers and servants of the castle lords lived. In 1817, the freedom still had 233 citizens. Some of the houses in the freedom are now listed buildings. In one house, the Raesfeld local history association is showing the exhibition "Raesfeld 1939-1945" on the Second World War, while other buildings are used as restaurants, hotels and stores.

The design of the castle chapel by the late Michael van Gent was "modified into a modern form". The columns, round arches and the side towers with Welsch hoods arranged symmetrically to the central axis form a representative portal, which also displays early Baroque forms with the curved pediment and the coat of arms stone above the entrance. The castle chapel was built by Jacob Schmidt around 1658.

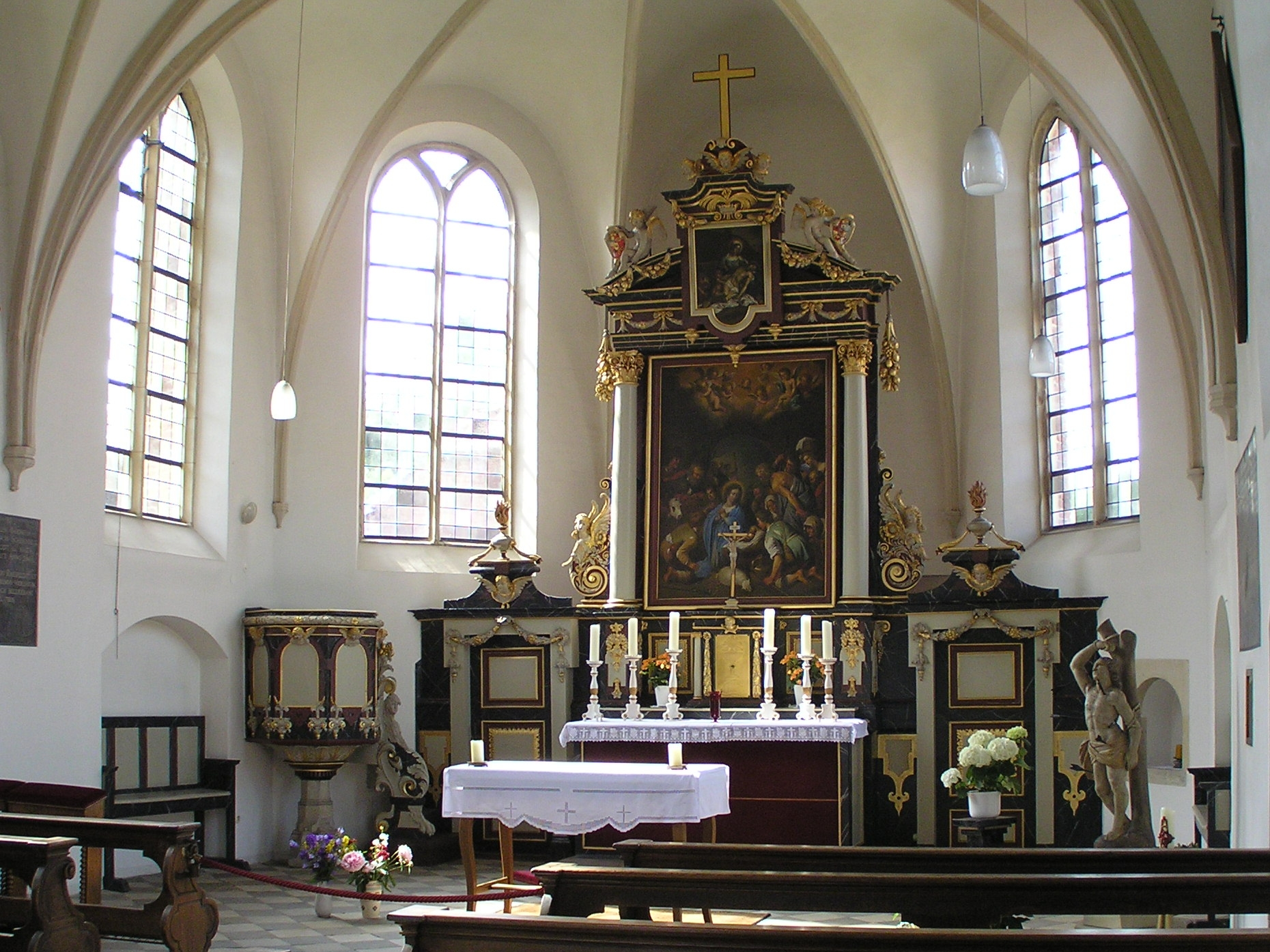
Choir room of the castle chapel with baroque altar

The sculptor Dietrich Wichmann worked as a master stonemason, while Andreas Petersen was responsible for the interior decoration. François Walschaerth painted the unsigned altarpiece "The Adoration of the Lord" and eight smaller paintings that no longer exist. Claes Obermöller created the magnificent baroque altar. The organ by Conrad Ruprecht was completed by Whitsun 1659. Below the choir is the family crypt, where locksmith Alexander II of Velen is buried. The black marble tombstone was made during the count's lifetime; the lines for the dates of death were left blank. Alexander II had a second plaque made in the same style for his first wife and his son Paul Ernst. During restoration work in 1962, the "leaden heart" of Christoph Otto von Velen, who died in 1733, was discovered in the crypt and is now kept in a niche on the right side of the choir. The last castle vicar moved out in 1901 and today the chapel is owned by the Catholic parish of St. Martin in Raesfeld.

==== Organ ====
Since 2010, there has been a small organ on the organ stage in the castle chapel, built by the organ building company Stockmann (Werl). The purely mechanical instrument was built in an organ case that was adapted to the style of the chapel's interior.

I Main work C–f^{3}
1.	Flûte	8′
2.	Praestant	4′
3.	Flûte à chimenée	4′
4.	Doublette	2′

(Continuation)
5.	Sesquialter II (ab g^{0})	2 2/3′
6.	Mixture II-III	1 1/3′
	Tremblant

II Chest work C–f^{3}
7.	Bourdon	8′
8.	Cromorne	8′

Pedal C–f^{1}
9.	Sousbasse	16′

- Couplers: II/I, I/P, II/P

=== Castle park and zoo ===
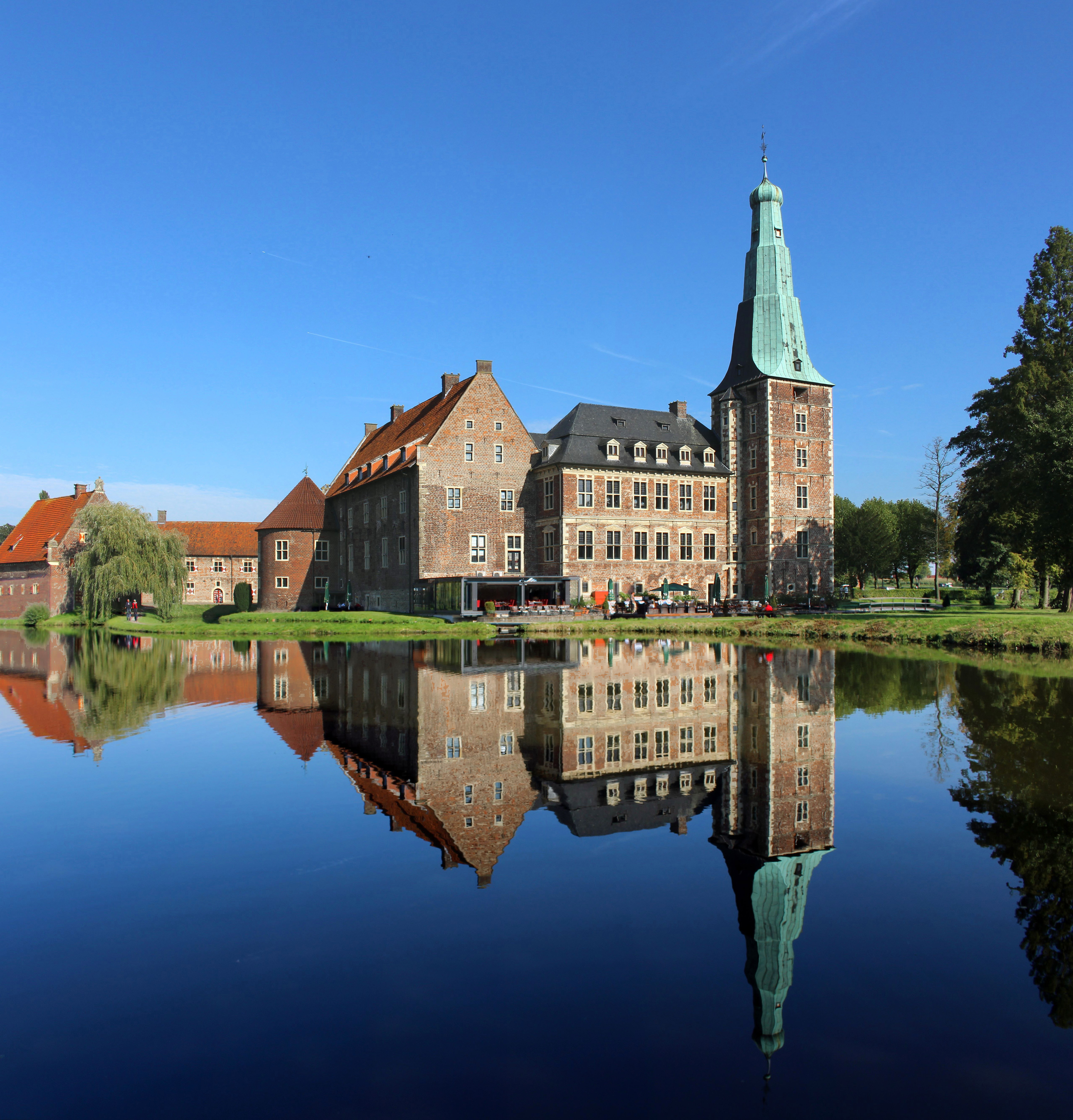
The castle with its reflection

A regular, geometric park was laid out to the north of the palace. The work was carried out by "French gardeners and French fountain makers". As well as being used for representation, part of the palace park also served as a kitchen garden. The contract with the sculptor Scharp describes a fountain created in 1655/56: "The sea god Neptune sitting on a mountain of stones, surrounded by crocodiles, turtles, and grotto creatures". A fountain with five fountains was also built in 1668. Further work in the palace park can be traced back to 1713. An orangery is shown on the Oßingh map from 1729 and is mentioned in a list from 1770; it probably only disappeared after 1849. The grounds have been used for agriculture since then.

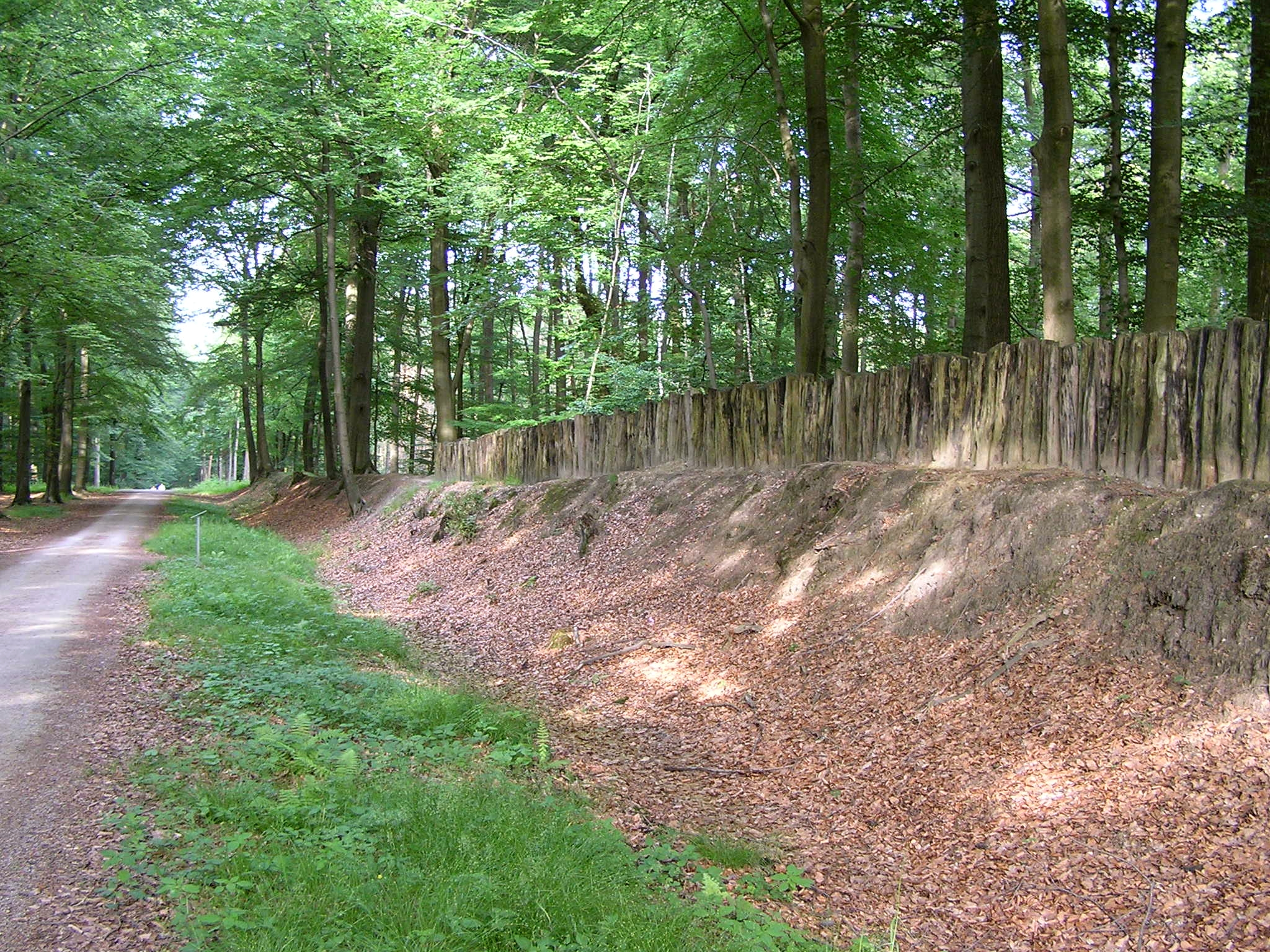
The rampart in the Zoo. Around 50 m of palisades were placed here to make the original function recognizable.

From 1653, Alexander II von Velen had a "zoo" created to the west of the castle as a hunting park. For this purpose, an area of around 100 hectares was enclosed by a rampart around five kilometers long with attached palisades. Local game such as wild boar, roe deer and red deer were kept for hunting within the zoo. However, exotic animals were also kept: The oldest evidence of fallow deer in North Rhine-Westphalia, unknown until then, comes from Raesfeld in 1664. In 1670, John Maurice, Prince of Nassau-Siegen presented Alexander II with an "American pregnant buffalo cow, as Your Grace is a particular lover of foreign animals and the best".

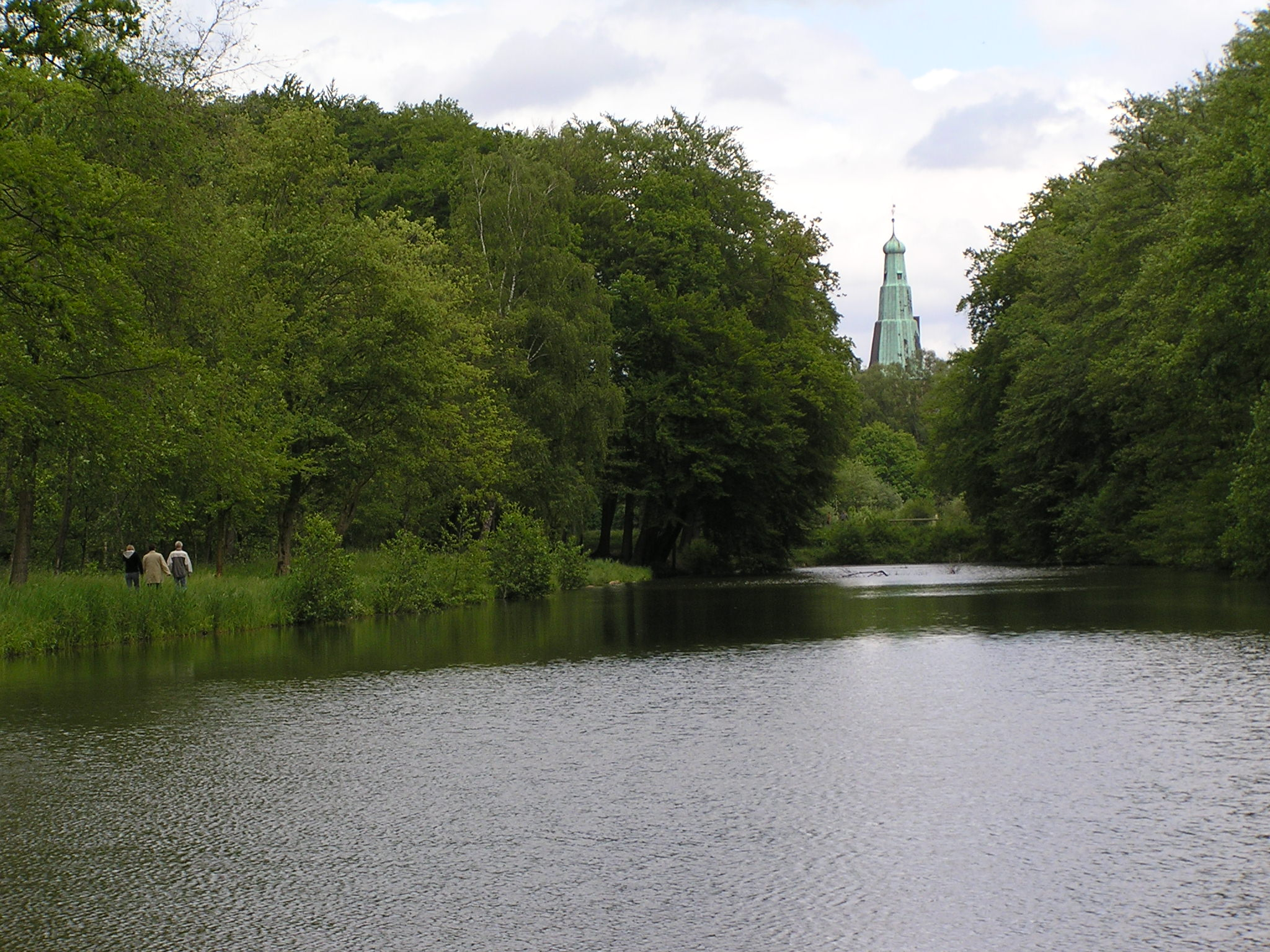
The most obvious Baroque transformation is the Long Pond with the line of sight to the main tower.

The Renaissance landscape design is reflected in the natural alternation of typical regional landscape elements such as mixed beech forests, mixed coniferous forests and scattered carrs, pastures, small fields and heaths. Streams and ponds run like an organic ribbon from the castle in the east to the southwest. As an imitation of nature, these grounds also served to demonstrate the power of the lord of the castle. After the death of Alexander II, Ferdinand Gottfried von Velen continued the expansion of the garden. This included a fountain with four dolphins, created in 1681 and probably built on the vineyard island. Unlike most Renaissance palace gardens, however, Raesfeld Zoo was not significantly transformed by modern forms such as the Baroque park or the English landscape park. The most important innovation in the 18th century was the creation of the Long Pond, which forms a visual axis to the palace, and the draining of the pond to the southwest.

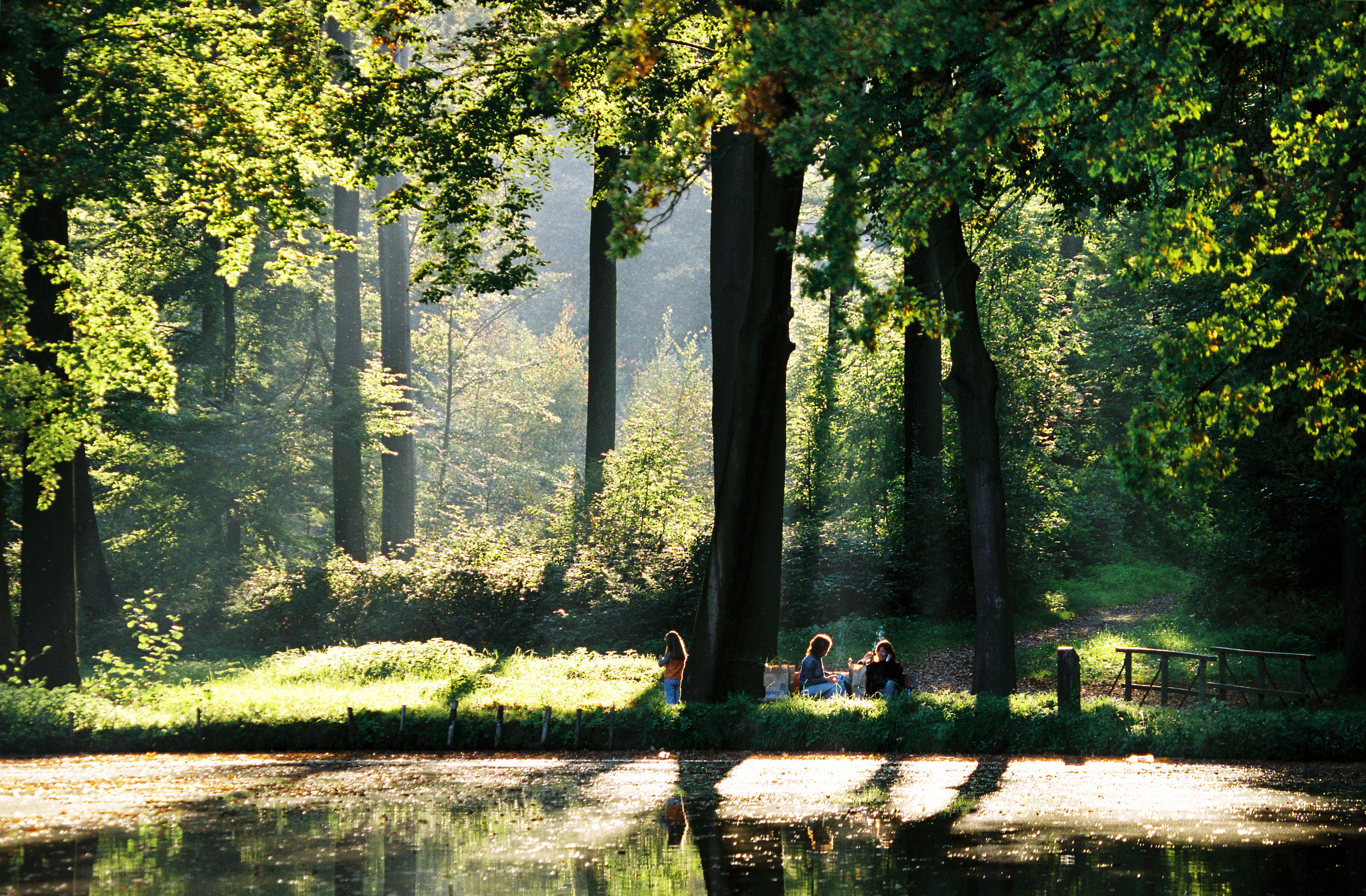
Forest idyll at the long pond in the zoo of Raesfeld Castle

Following the decline of the royal residence, the zoological garden also fell into disuse and subsequently became overgrown. Two-thirds of the rampart has been preserved, but the enclosure with palisades is already missing on a cadastral map from 1824. This indicates that the area had lost its function as a zoo by that time. Subsequently, the publicly accessible woodland area was utilized solely for forestry purposes.

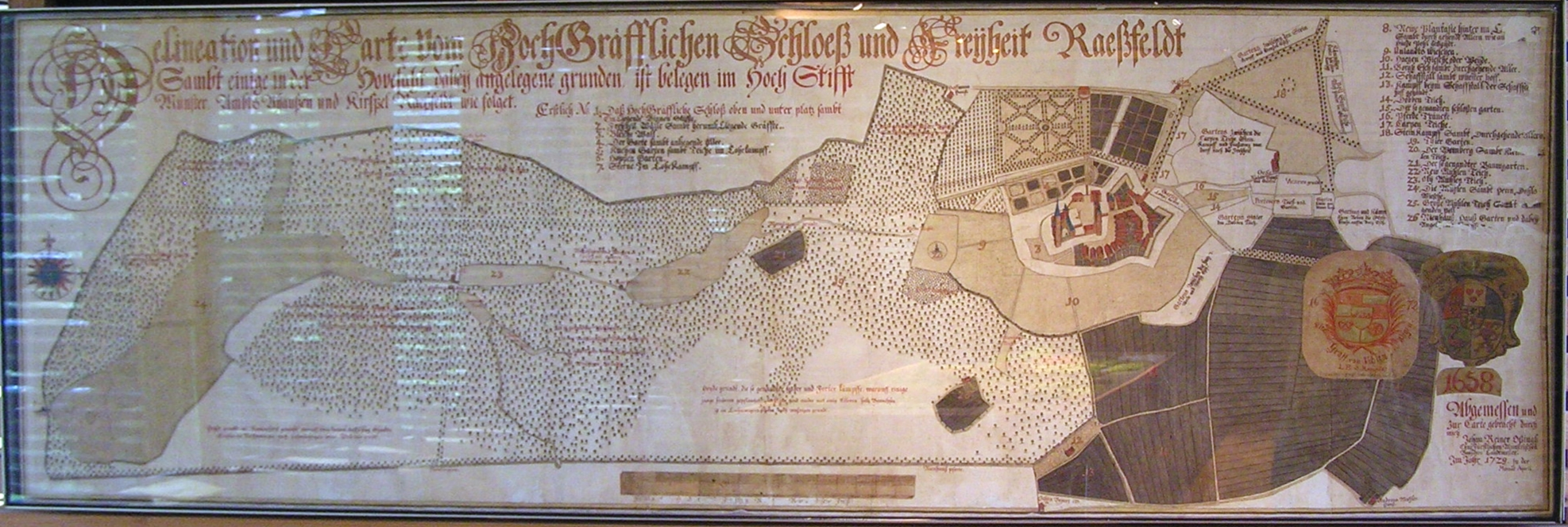
Map of the castle and zoo. Johan Reiner Oßing, 1729

In the early 1990s, a map by Johan Reiner Oßing from 1729 was rediscovered. Upon closer inspection of the map, the Westphalian Office for the Preservation of Historical Monuments concluded that the Raesfeld Zoo was one of the oldest preserved Renaissance palace gardens in Germany. However, the idea of reviving the original zoo was considered an unaffordable utopian fantasy. The project was finally realized in 2004 as part of the regional festival " Left and Right of the Ems ". The non-profit association Zoo Raesfeld Castle was founded in 2003 and signed a 25-year contract with the owner Dietrich von Landsberg-Velen.

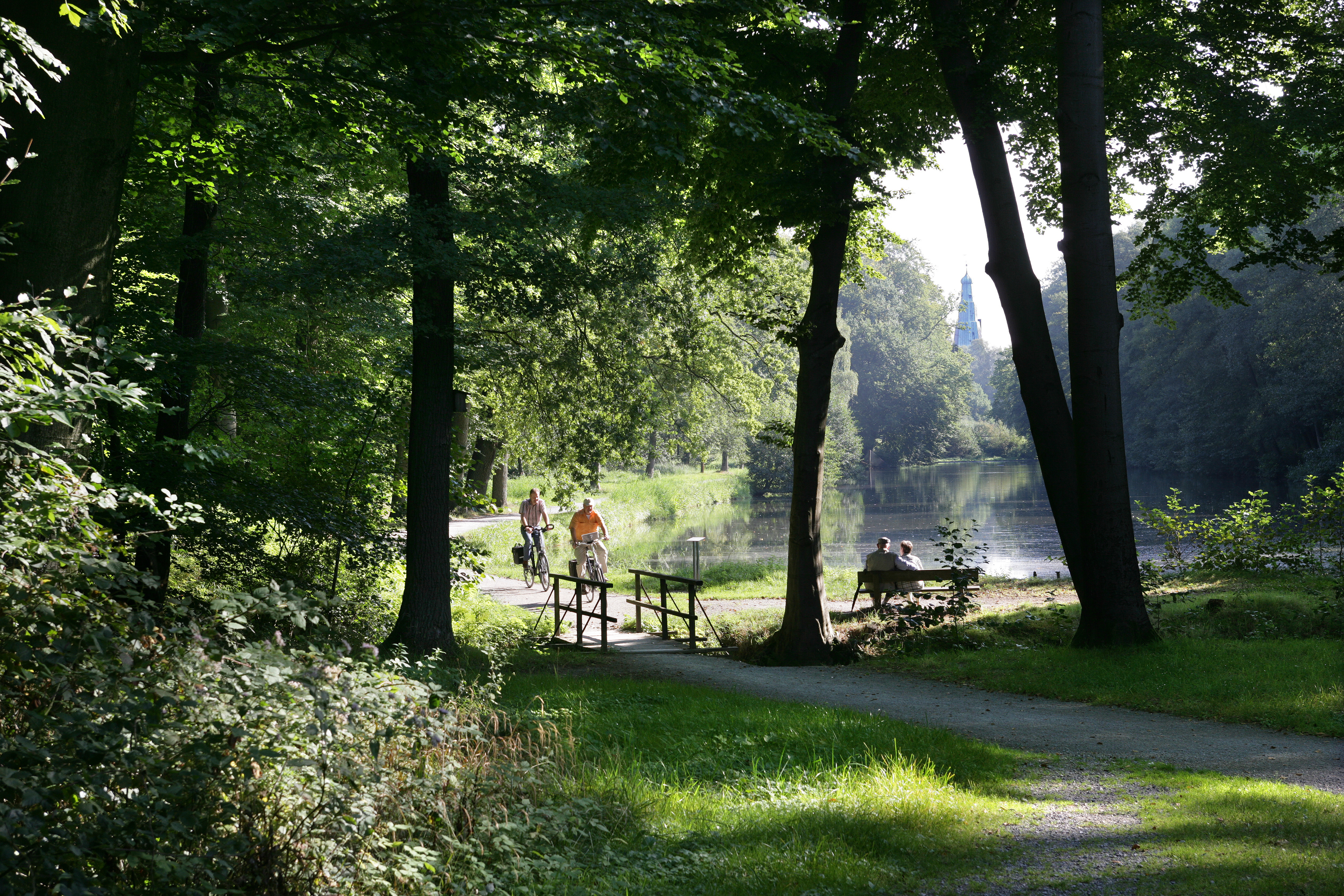
Renaissance zoo Raesfeld Castle

The zoo was redesigned according to a master plan by renowned landscape architect Gerd Aufmkolk. The aim, he says, was "not to reconstruct it in the sense of preserving a historical monument" but "to make the essential intentions of the Renaissance visible". An orchard with 40 apple, pear, plum and cherry trees, a heath area and wet meadows were created. Some areas have been cleared and groups of trees felled to create open spaces. These serve as grazing areas for the reintroduced roe, red and fallow deer, which can roam freely in the 130-hectare area surrounded by a modern deer fence.

The zoo is still open to the public and serves as a local recreation area. The area is accessible via circular hiking trails. An educational trail provides information about nature and culture along the way, such as the artesian spring of the Welbrock stream, the ponds and a ruined mill from the early 18th century.

=== Information and visitors center ===
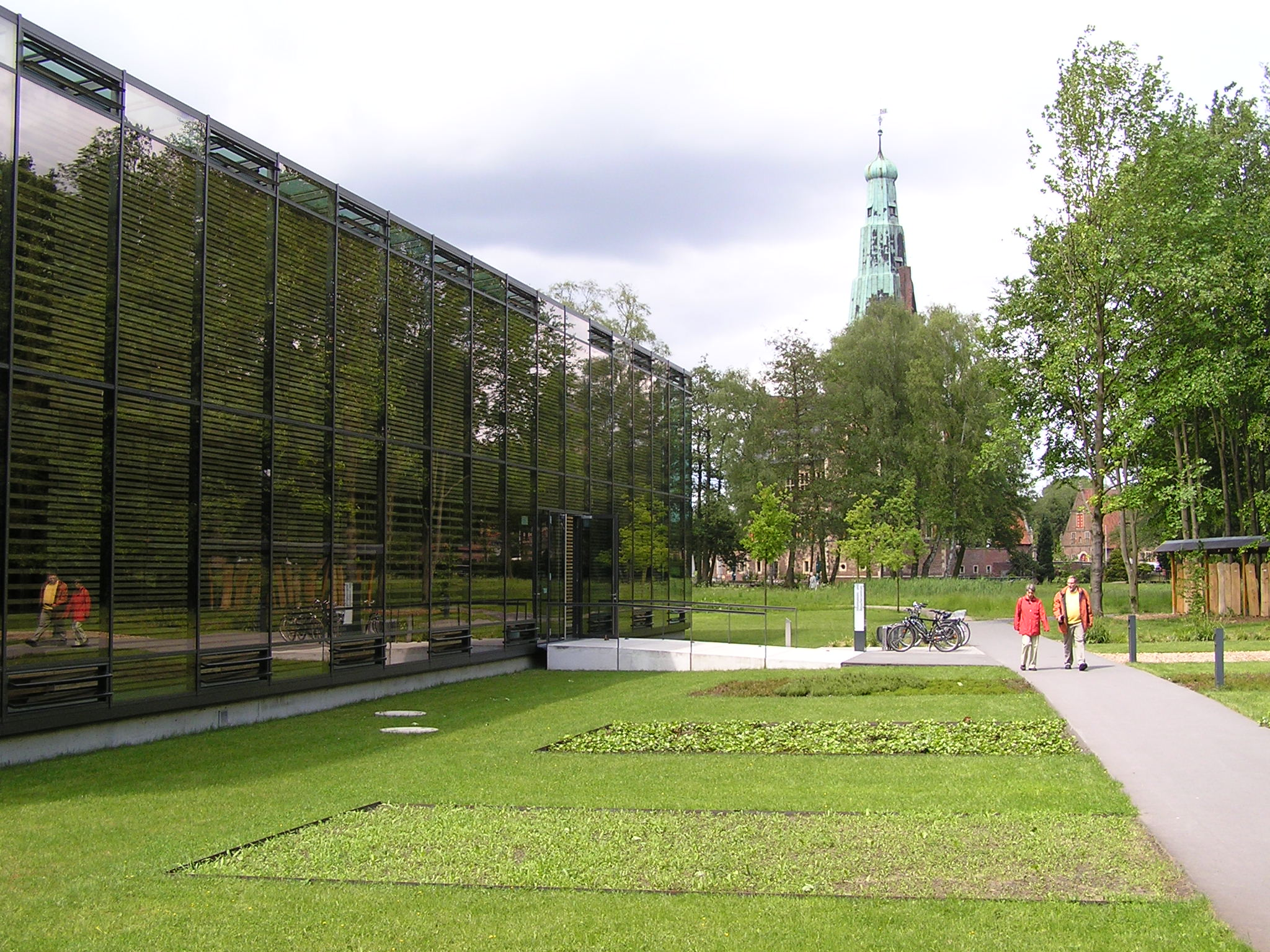
Raesfeld Castle Zoo Information and Visitor Center

The Raesfeld Castle Zoo Information and Visitor Center was opened in spring 2005. The modern building, designed by the architectural firm Farwick + Grote from Ahaus, is characterized by its wooden construction, which is encased in a glass façade. In the foyer of the center, visitors can obtain information about tourist attractions in Raesfeld and the region, particularly in the Hohe Mark-Westmünsterland Nature Park.

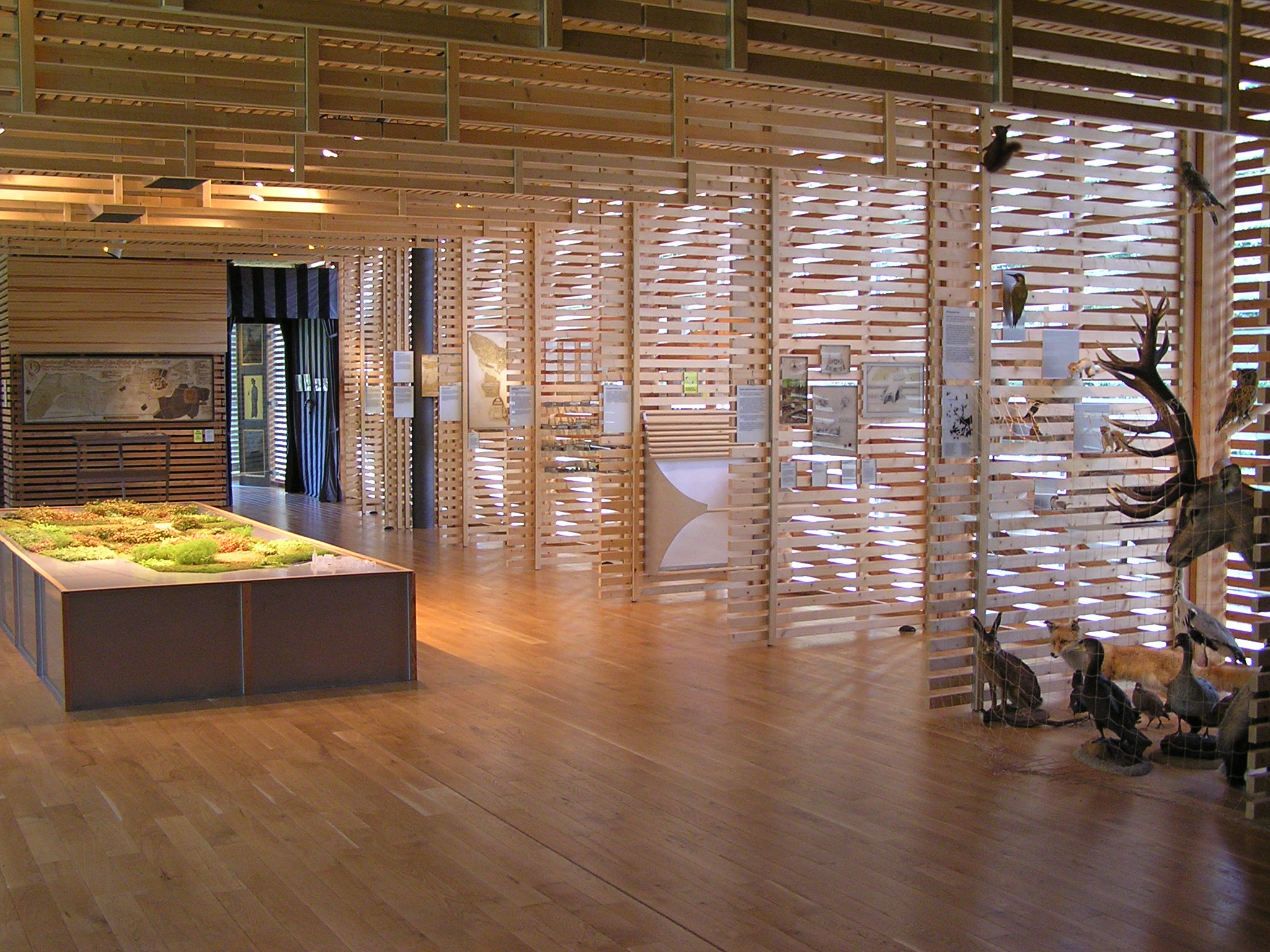
Exhibition "Appearance of a cultural landscape - Renaissance zoo Raesfeld"

The upper floor is home to the permanent exhibition on natural and cultural history, Appearance of a Cultural Landscape - Renaissance Zoo Raesfeld. It deals with the history of the castle and the zoo and compares them with other sites. Documents, models, maps and components are on display. Among other things, the original alliance coat of arms of Alexander II von Velen and his wife Alexandrine, which hung above the gateway of the outer bailey, and the restored Oßing map from 1729, which contributed to the discovery of the Renaissance zoo, are on display. Animal specimens and a miniature model of the zoo made of living plants, modeled on Japanese garden art, also serve as vivid exhibits. Other playful information elements place the history of the zoo in the context of the protection of historical cultural landscapes.

In the nature workshop on the first floor, practice-oriented nature and environmental education seminars are offered for all age groups. The adjacent room provides space for the Raesfeld Forum for Sustainable Regional Development, which offers lectures, conferences and seminars on topics such as environmental and nature conservation, agriculture and forestry.

== History ==
=== The lords of the mountain ===
Rabodo von dem Berge was documented as the lord of the castle between 1168 and 1174. He belonged to an influential noble family from Montferland in the Duchy of Guelders. The family probably came into possession of Raesfeld Castle through the marriage of Rabodo's father of the same name to a daughter of the House of Gemen. The castle was probably the Kretier castle, which no longer exists. Rabodo probably had the church dedicated to St. Martin built, around which the village of Raesfeld grew.

The next lord of the castle was Heinrich von dem Berge, who was mentioned in a document in 1245. In 1259, his son Adam von dem Berge sold the castle, known as Raboding-Hof, together with the jurisdiction and patronage of the village church to his distant relative Symon von Gemen (around 1231 - before 1265), who had probably already administered the castle. The knight of the Gemen family later called himself Symon of Rasvelde. Probably after the purchase, the wooden castle burned down. It was not rebuilt and fell into disrepair when Symon had the first stone castle built on the site of the present castle.

=== The Knights of Raesfeld ===
The descendants of Simon von Raesfeld remained lords of Raesfeld Castle for around 300 years. First his son Mathias von Raesfeld (around 1245 - around 1318) and later his grandson Johann I von Raesfeld (around 1282 - around 1356) took over the castle. The latter was summoned to the Council of the Estates in 1336 by the Prince-Bishop of Münster, Ludwig II von Hessen, where he swore allegiance to the Prince-Bishop. As a result of the collapse of the County of Hamaland, the Duchy of Cleves gained influence in western Münsterland in the 14th century. The feudal system made Raesfeld Castle the Öffnungsrecht of the Duchy of Cleves.

Bytter I of Raesfeld (* around 1325; † between 1403 and 1410), the eldest son of John I, became known as a warrior. In an alliance with his brother-in-law, Henry III of Gemen, and John and Goswin of Lembeck, he defeated the Heiden Lord of Wennemar Castle in 1374. The southern part of his manor then came into the possession of Raesfeld. In 1388 Bytter I, his son Johann II, and 25 Raesfeld soldiers came to the aid of the imperial city of Dortmund. The city was besieged by the troops of the Cologne archbishop Friedrich III of Saarwerden and Engelbert III of the Mark and hired knights to defend its freedom. During the raids, the Raesfeld knights captured the besieging knight von der Horst but released him for a ransom. In August 1389, they sacked Recklinghausen in the vest of Electoral Cologne. At the end of 1389, the siege was over and Bytter I of Raesfeld was paid.

He had Raesfeld Castle extended with the wages of war and the spoils of plunder. The new castle was partly built on the foundations of the old stone castle. At the beginning of the 15th century, the property belonging to Raesfeld included, in addition to Raesfeld Castle, the houses Empte near Dülmen-Kirchspiel, Ostendorf near Haltern-Lippramsdorf and Haus Hameren near Billerbeck.

Johann II of Raesfeld (c. 1375 - after 1443) became the new lord of the castle after the death of his father. He became known as a robber baron, and the prince-bishop of Münster, Otto IV, openly called him a highwayman. Another contemporary wrote in 1408: "There was a man named Johann von Raesfeld who plundered the streets and took many goods from the merchants, their clothes, money, and bags, and carried them to his house". John II, on the other hand, was held in high esteem by Emperor Sigismund. For his loyalty as a vassal in war, presumably in the Hussite War of 1420–21, he was granted the right to mint rights. However, due to a lack of masters, workshops, and precious metals, John II probably did not make use of the right to mint coins. In 1427, John II made an agreement with Adolf IV of Cleves, who had been appointed duke: John II was allowed to keep the Advocatus revenues from the parish of Raesfeld for twelve years and in return promised to support the Duke of Cleves in his feud with the Archbishop of Cologne. Johann II also received instructions and presumably further funds from Cleves for the fortification of Raesfeld Castle. The work was completed in 1440.

=== Inheritance dispute ===
From 1523, Johann IV of Raesfeld (1492–1551) was the sole lord of the castle, as his mother Frederike moved into her own house. In the summer of 1532, John IV was elected commander-in-chief of the imperial cavalry and moved to Vienna to defend the imperial city in the Ottoman War. In 1535, he assisted the prince-bishop of Münster, Franz von Waldeck, as a field commander in the siege and capture of the city of Münster and the destruction of the Anabaptist kingdom of Münster. As a reward, John IV received the right to build a mill in his parish, the office of Drosten in Ahaus as a fief, and 13,000 gold guilders. His third wife, Irmgard of Boyneburg, gave birth to a boy in November 1550, providing John IV with an heir. In the summer of 1551, John IV died a "hasty death" when he was struck by a falling heavy iron bar.

In 1558, his widow married Goswin of Raesfeld (1494-1579/80), a distant relative of her late husband. Irmgard moved with the young Johann to Goswin at Twickel Castle near Delden, where Goswin Droste was living in Twente. Johann attended the Latin school in Deventer, but died in 1559. Concerned that without his son as heir, he would lose Raesfeld Castle and all its possessions and rights to his relatives, the Lords of Velen and Heiden, Goswin, his stepfather, quickly occupied the castle and claimed the inheritance. On behalf of the Lords of Velen and Heiden, who were now actually entitled to the inheritance, Bernhard von Raesfeld, Prince-Bishop of Münster, filed a lawsuit against his relative Goswin before the Imperial Chamber Court in Speyer. In 1585, the highest German court awarded the castle of Raesfeld to the Lords of Velen, putting an end to the dispute. Irmgard, who had ruled Raesfeld alone since the death of her second husband Goswin in 1579/80, now had to leave the castle with her children.

=== The Lords of Velen ===
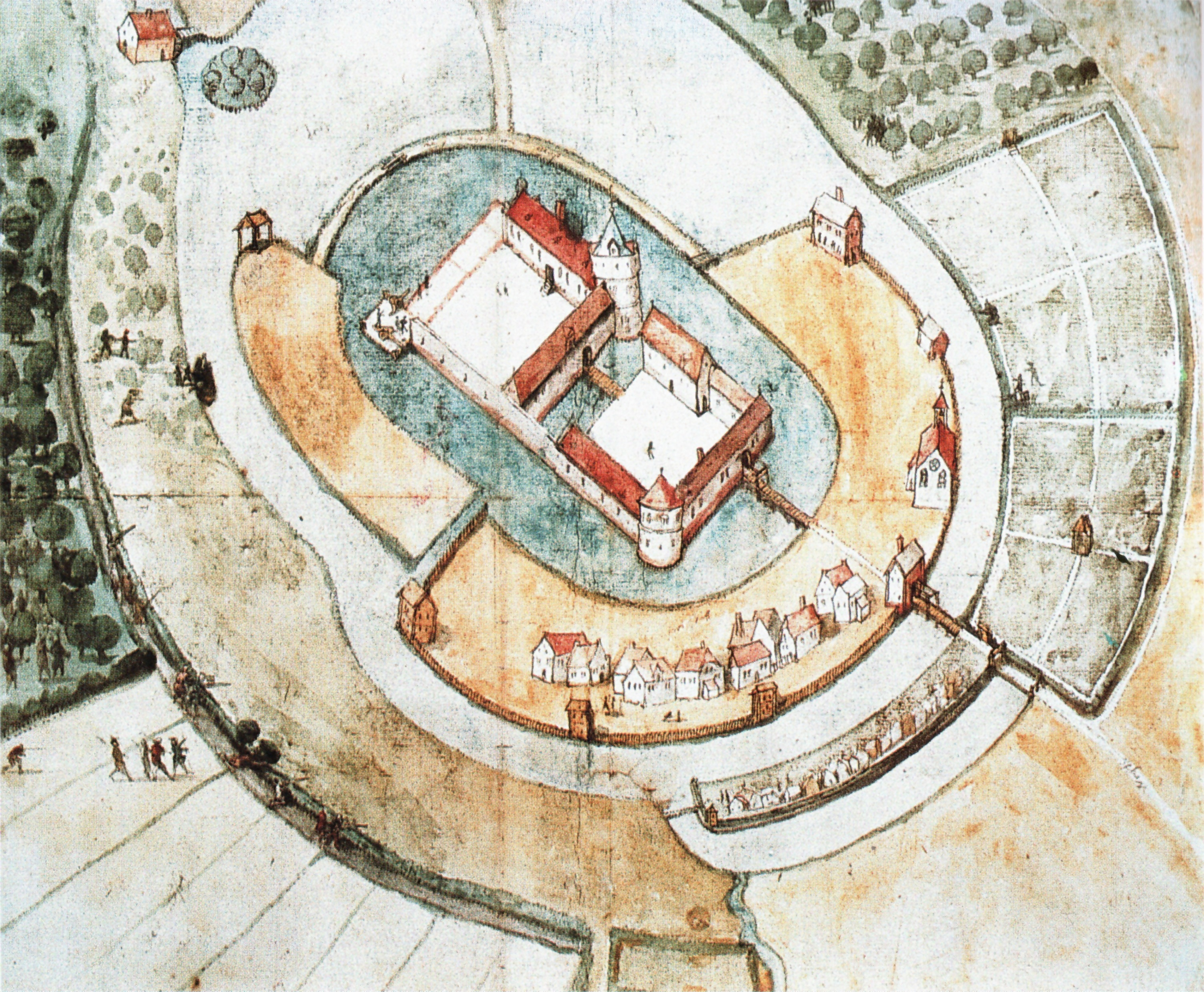
Southeast view of Raesfeld Castle before the fire. Hermann tom Ring (attributed) around 1590.

Hermann VIII von Velen zu Velen († 1521) had married Margarethe von Raesfeld zu Raesfeld, a sister of John IV von Raesfeld. Hermann and Margarethe's son, Hermann IX von Velen zu Velen (1516–1584), was governor and Droste in Emsland, Rheine and Bevergern and served the prince-bishop as court marshal. His sons became heirs to Raesfeld Castle following the decision of the Imperial Chamber Court in 1585. Raesfeld was to be extended as a border castle in 1589 to protect Münster Abbey from the Eighty Years' War, but Spanish troops occupied the castle in 1590 and prevented the extension.

In 1595, Alexander I von Velen (1556–1630) received the Raesfeld estate when the property of his father Hermann IX, who had died in 1584, was divided up. Alexander I had previously fought against the Turks in the service of the Kingdom of Hungary and the Crown of Bohemia, albeit without much success. In 1597, while Alexander I was visiting the imperial court in Vienna as the diplomatic representative of the Prince-Bishop of Münster, the roof of Raesfeld Castle burned down. On this occasion, Alexander I had the two-storey manor house rebuilt for residential purposes from 1604 to 1606. He had generated the funds for this with the Gottesgabe salt works near Rheine, which belonged to him, and also received a loan of 5000 Reichstaler from the Diet of Münster Abbey and the councillors of the state. In 1612, on the occasion of the coronation of Emperor Matthias, Alexander I received the title of Roman Imperial Majesty's appointed colonel and was knighted. In 1613, an emergency building had to be erected because a violent storm had destroyed a wall of the great hall. With diplomatic skill, the lord of the castle was able to prevent further destruction by the Spanish mercenaries who occupied the castle under the command of Don Loys de Velasco in 1615/16. In 1619, Alexander I was given general command of the entire Münster army. The Thirty Years' War reached Raesfeld when Hessian troops under the Count of Mansfeld occupied and pillaged the castle in the late fall of 1622. In 1628, Alexander I was elevated to the status of Imperial Baron by Emperor Ferdinand II. Two years later, on August 8, 1630, Alexander I von Velen died.

=== Expansion to a residential palace ===
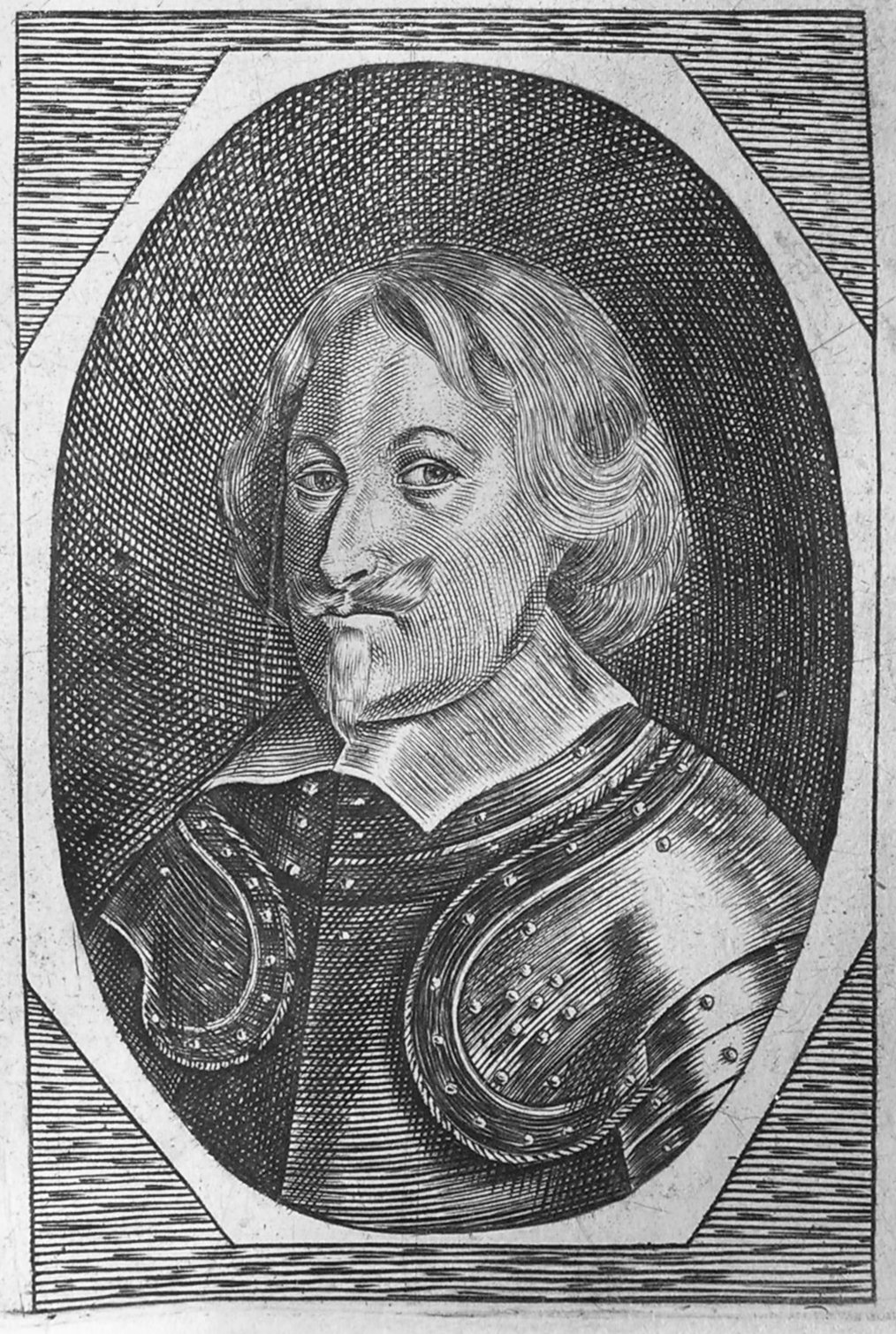
Alexander II. von Velen in Brachelius’ Historia nostri temporis (1652)

His son Alexander II von Velen (1599–1675), later known as the Westphalian Wallenstein, took over the castle, which he had already managed independently for some time. He had joined the army at the outbreak of the Thirty Years' War and gained a high reputation in the united army of the Counts of Anholt and Tilly on the imperial side. From 1632, Alexander II fought on behalf of the Elector and Bishop Ferdinand against the Hessian occupiers of Westphalia. In 1634, Alexander II was promoted to General Constable of the Catholic League and given command of all the armed forces of the prince-bishopric. As a reward for his military successes, he was granted special neutrality for Raesfeld Castle. In the summer of 1641, together with the Count of Hatzfeld, he succeeded in capturing the town of Dorsten near Raesfeld, which was occupied by Hessian troops. On October 11, 1641, Alexander II was granted the hereditary title of Imperial Count by Emperor Ferdinand III. In 1644, he received from him the "privilegium exemptionis fori" for his jurisdiction of the Imperial Count. At his request, Alexander II retired from military service in 1646.

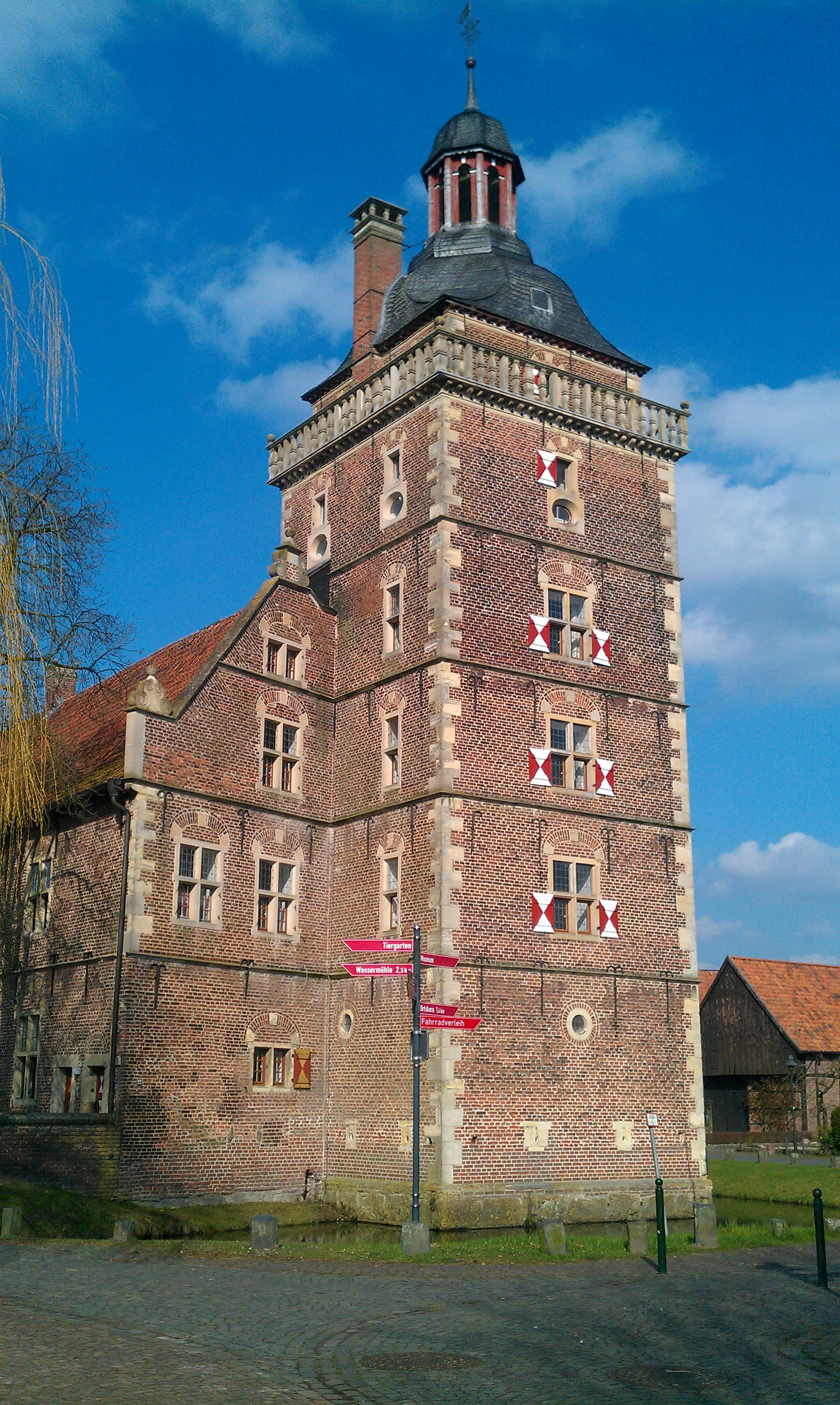
Outer bailey Sterndeuter Tower

Stories were told in the country about the wealth accumulated during military service. Prince-Bishop Ferdinand said of Alexander II: "The Count of Vele had a good war in Westphalia. He must have enjoyed a half million". Between 1646 and 1658, he had the damaged Raesfeld Castle rebuilt into a prestigious residential palace as the center of his aspiring imperial principality. The additions included three additional wings to the main building with a tower, an outer bailey with the so-called Sterndeuter tower, a chapel, as well as lush parks and a zoo. During the construction period, the family and their staff mainly lived in the Hagenbeck House on the Lippe River.

Alexander II had been appointed Field Marshal and Imperial War Councilor in 1653, cultivated his relations with the imperial court and represented the emperor at ceremonies. Many high-ranking personalities stayed at Raesfeld Castle at this time, such as the Bishop of Strasbourg and Elector of Brandenburg Friedrich Wilhelm and Prince-Bishop Christoph Bernhard von Galen. In addition to Raesfeld Castle, Alexander II's possessions included the houses of Krudenburg and Hagenbeck on the Lippe, Horst on the lower Ruhr, Megen in the Duchy of Brabant, Engelrading Castle near Marbeck and Bretzenheim Castle with its Imperial immediacy, which earned him a seat and vote in the Imperial Diet.

=== Fall of the imperial county ===
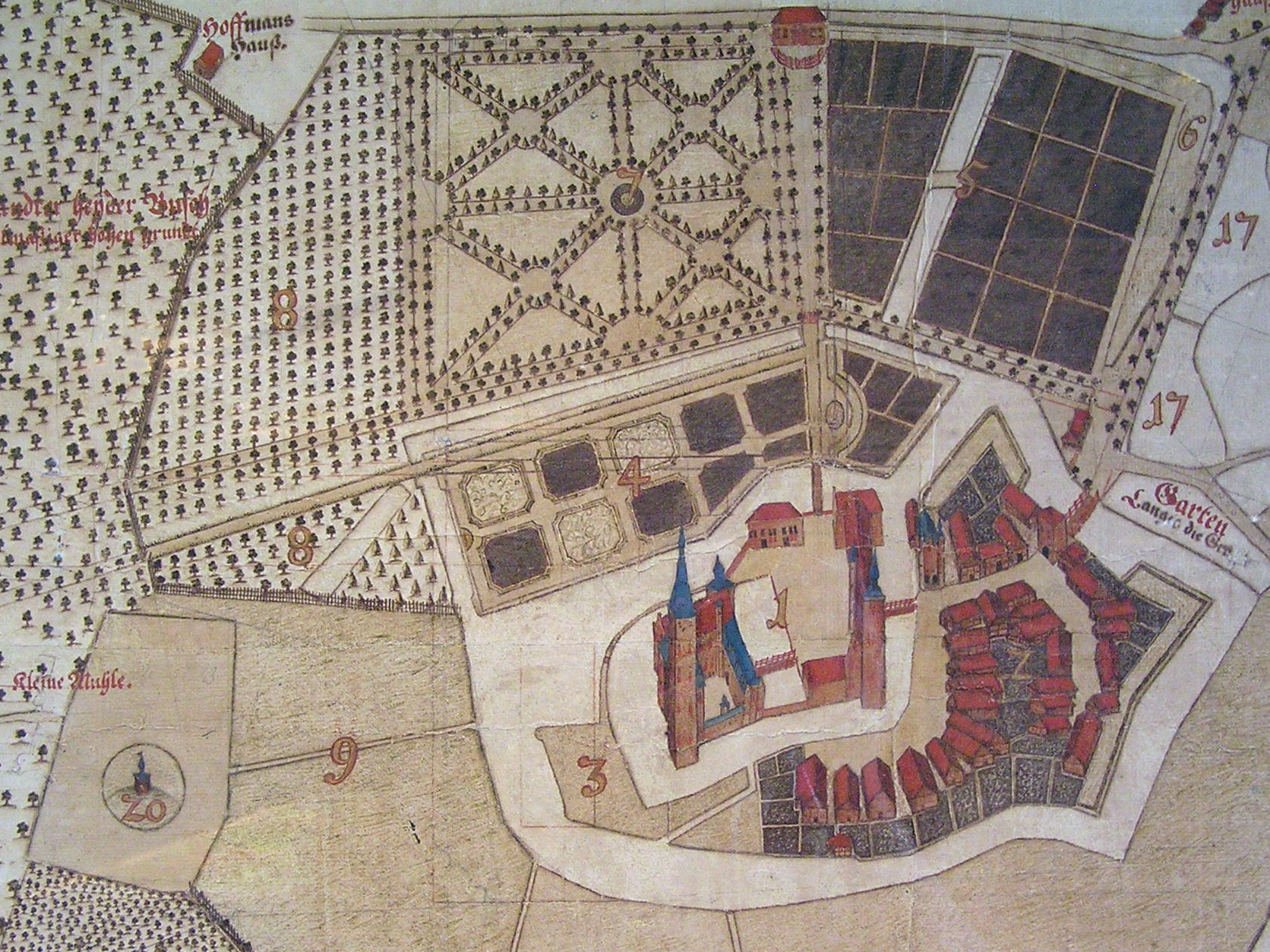
Raesfeld Castle after the extension by Alexander II, detail from the map by Johan Reiner Oßing, 1729

After the death of Ferdinand Gottfried and his wife Sophie Elisabeth von Limburg-Styrum in 1685, their eldest son Alexander Otto von Velen (1657–1727) became the new lord of Raesfeld Castle. He became imperial cavalry general, but the demands of creditors and the arrears in wages for the servants also exceeded Alexander Otto's income. In addition, there was an inheritance dispute with his younger brother Christoph Otto and claims by his sister Charlotte Amalie. In 1708, Alexander Otto was appointed general commander of the entire imperial cavalry and in 1726, one year before his death, he was promoted to field marshal. Two of his sons, Hyacinth Joseph and Gabriel Phillip, fell as soldiers before Belgrade in 1717, and so Alexander III von Velen (1683–1733) was to take over the inheritance in 1727.

However, Alexander III left the indebted inheritance to his uncle Christoph Otto von Velen (1671–1733). The latter had made it to the rank of colonel in the imperial military in 1708 and later to general. Christoph Otto was often in the Austrian Netherlands on business and so he probably appointed his nephew Alexander III and the Walloon Phillip Mouvé as administrators. In May 1733, the unmarried and childless Christoph Otto died in Brussels. He was buried in a crypt there, but his heart was preserved in a lead capsule and taken to Raesfeld for burial in the family crypt in the castle chapel.

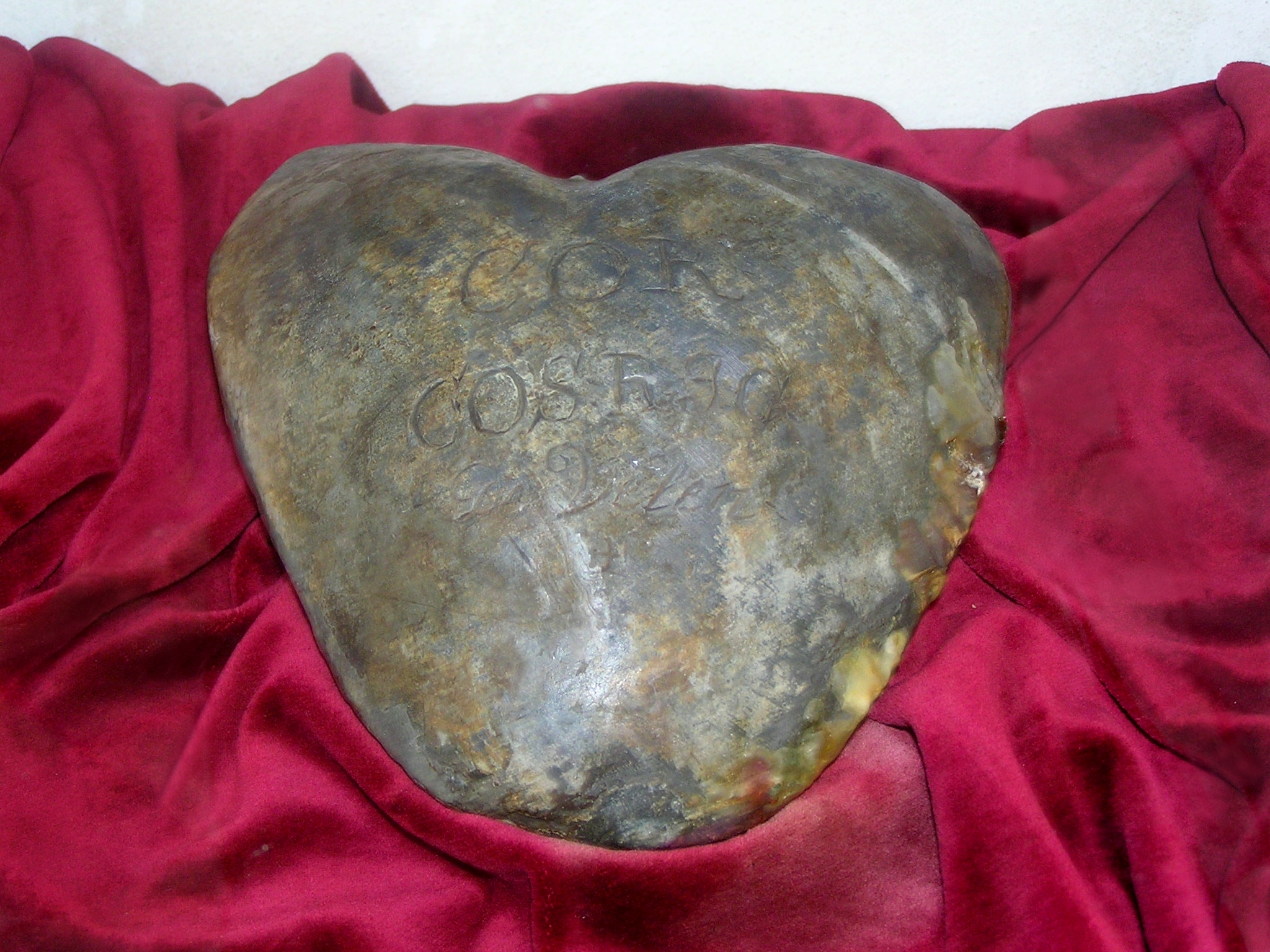
Heart of Lead by Christoph Otto von Velen in the Castle Chapel

Alexander III von Velen thus succeeded to the inheritance after all. He had married Maria Charlotte von Merode (1698–1753) in 1716, who gave birth to the boy Alexander (Alexander IV) Otto Carolus von Velen (1717–1733) a year later. However, father and son also died in 1733, which meant that the von Velen family in Raesfeld became extinct in the male line. In this case, Alexander III had negotiated an inheritance contract with the distantly related Gemen castle lord Otto Ernst Leopold Count of Limburg-Stirum. Raesfeld Castle thus came into the possession of the Lordship of Gemen. Maria Charlotte, the widow of Alexander III, occasionally lived in Raesfeld Castle until her death in October 1753 and took care of court matters. After that, however, the castle complex remained almost uninhabited and gradually fell into disrepair, as the people of Gemen took little care of it.

In 1800, the Gemen line of the Limburg-Styrum family died out with the 15-year-old Ferdinand August. The Gemen estate, including Raesfeld Castle, fell to Baron von Boyneburg-Bömelsberg from the Swabian town of Erolzheim. He also took little care of the empty and decaying castle.

During the Wars of Liberation in the winter of 1813/14, Cossack soldiers who were pursuing the French troops after the Battle of Leipzig quartered themselves in Raesfeld Castle. The condition of the castle can be guessed at, as the mayor provided the Cossack officers with more suitable accommodation.

=== Agricultural manor ===
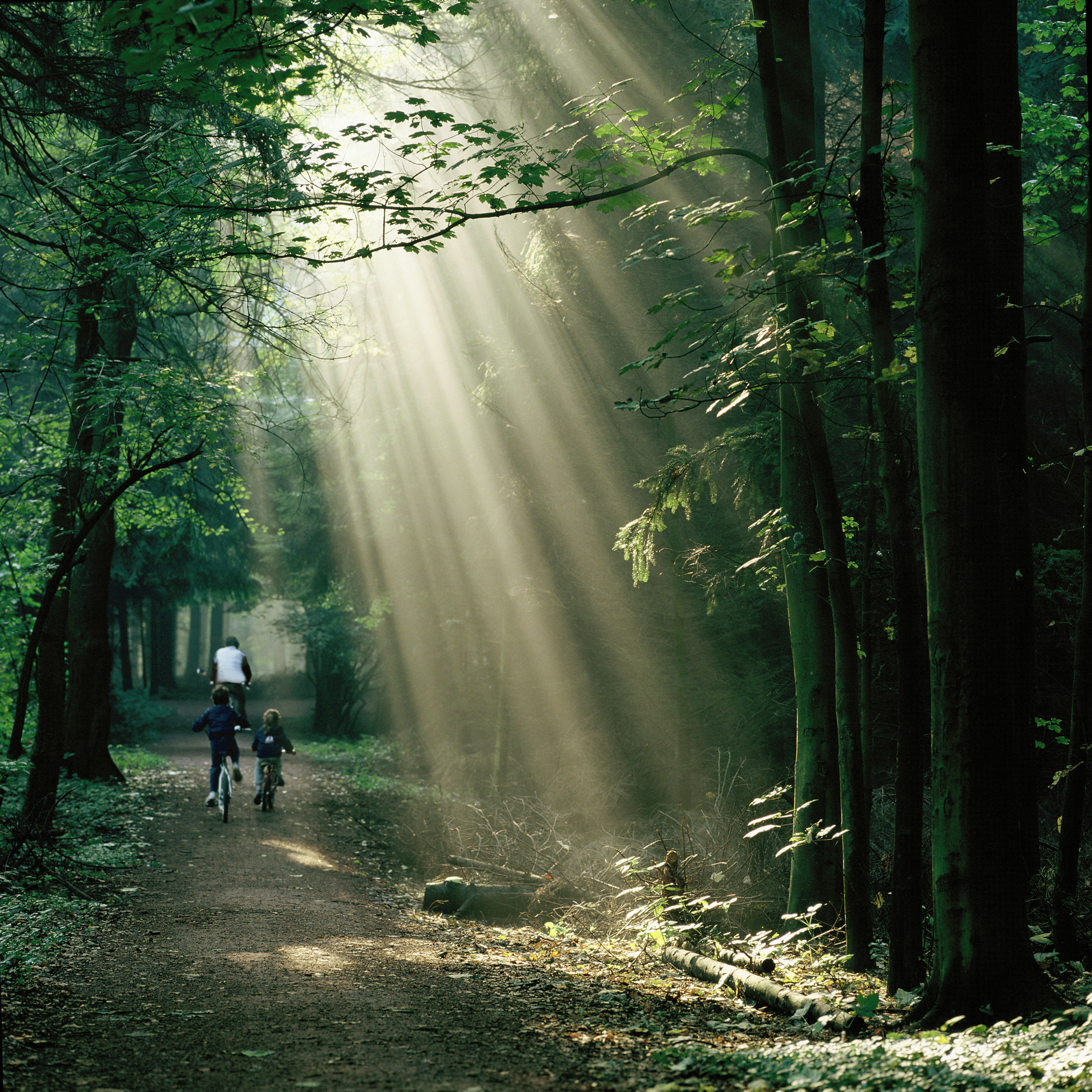
Light cascade in the "Renaissance animal garden water castle Raesfeld", in the "Hohe Mark Nature Park"

In 1822, Baron Ignaz von Landsberg-Velen bought the Westphalian estate of the distant Baron von Bömelsberg-Boineburg. The new lord used the buildings as an agricultural estate. The overgrown park was converted into farmland and the rampart was used to fill in the marshy moat. Dilapidated buildings such as the armory and the gatehouse fell victim to demolition. The northern round tower of the complex was also demolished, with the exception of the remains of the base. The time-honored knights' hall was now used to store grain supplies and the rooms in the outer bailey became cattle stables. Between 1879 and 1895, the head administrator Friedrich Bonhof had the outer bailey renovated.

After the end of the First World War, parts of a Bavarian division occupied the rooms of the castle in December 1918 and turned Raesfeld into a garrison for weeks. In March 1920, during the advance of the Ruhr Red Army in the course of the Ruhr Uprising, there was a battle with the Loewenfeld Free Corps, in which 50 Red Ruhr Army fighters lost their lives.

In 1927, the farmer Heinrich Albermeier leased the Raesfeld estate. With financial support from the provincial government, castle owner Max von Landsberg-Velen urgently needed repairs carried out.

=== Federal castle of the New Germany Federation ===
The Youth Federation New Germany, the alliance organization of Catholic students at secondary schools, leased Raesfeld Castle in 1929. After renovation work and new furnishings in spring 1930, the inauguration ceremony of the castle took place on Whitsun 1930. A tent city for 500 visitors was erected on the surrounding meadows. The director of the castle, student councillor J. Hasebrink, wrote: "The home has 80 beds and sufficient rooms with facilities for large camps and conferences of our Catholic youth." Several hundred boys from the youth movement regularly met in front of the castle at Whitsun. However, the unification of the youth associations with the Hitler Youth in 1936/37 led to the dissolution of the Youth Federation New Germany.

=== Garrison, dressing station and prisoner-of-war camp ===
The Second World War prevented the castle from being converted for use as a district training castle for the NSDAP. When parts of the German army moved from the invasion of Poland to the Western campaign in October 1939, Raesfeld became a garrison for almost 1,000 soldiers. Five years later, in the fall of 1944, the German army withdrew from the western front, and parts of it were once again quartered at the castle.

In March 1945, Raesfeld Castle became the main assembly point for the retreating German army. The Red Cross signs on the roofs prevented major damage to the castle from Allied aerial bombs. With Operation Plunder near Wesel, the front moved to within a few kilometers of Raesfeld until the British army finally took over the castle on 28 March. The British military staff set up an office in the outer bailey, while families who had fled from the cities of the Ruhr region were accommodated in the main house and the tower. The castle's Knights' Hall served as a prisoner of war camp for a company of German army soldiers from April 1945 to March 1946. In the post-war years, the castle buildings served as emergency accommodation for displaced persons from the East and four classes of the Raesfeld elementary school.

=== Other utilization ===
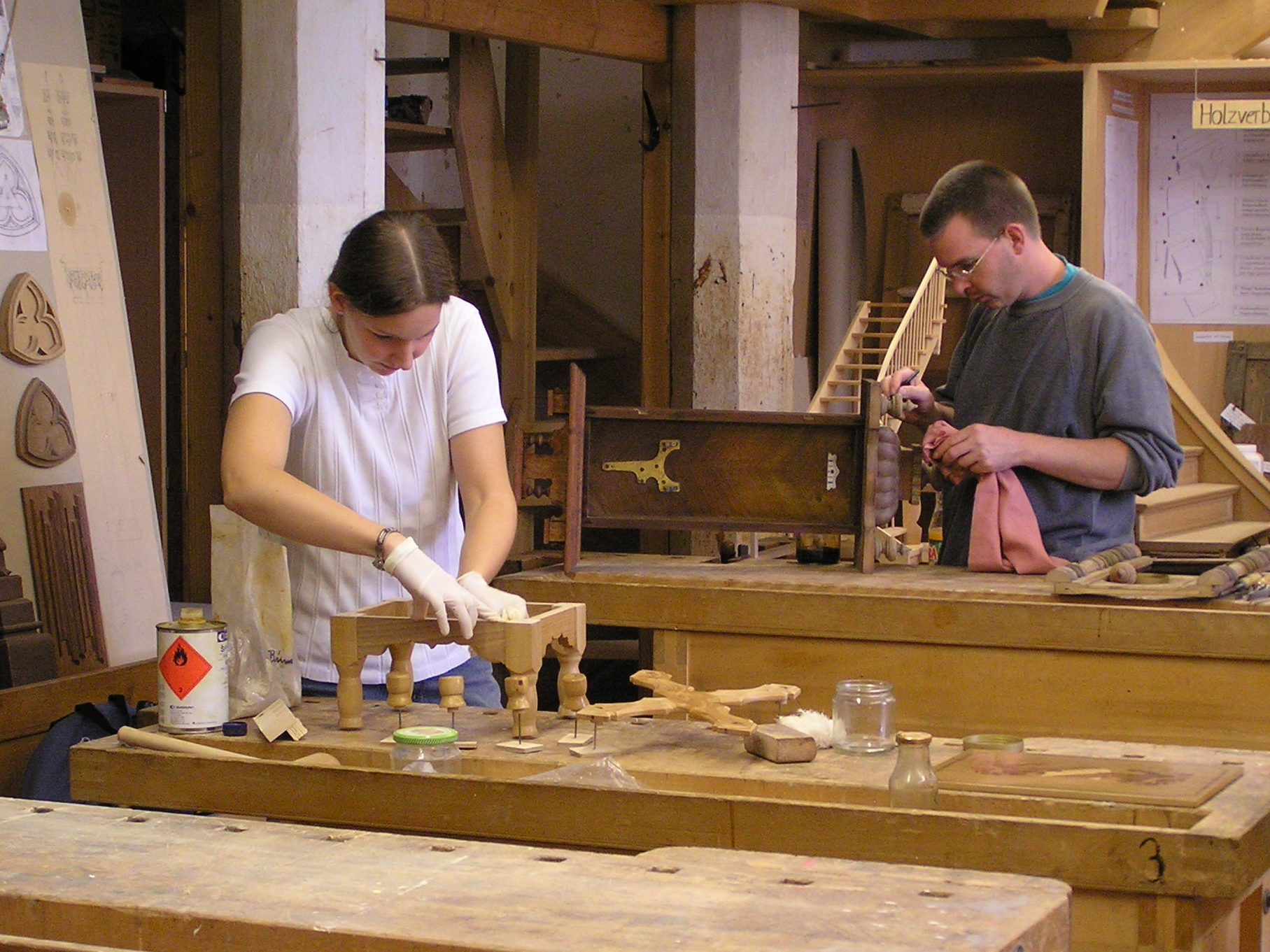
Restorers in the wood workshop of the Academy of Crafts

The Raesfeld Craftsmen's Association acquired the castle back in 1942. The association had the war-damaged and dilapidated complex restored between 1950 and 1951.

On January 1, 2022, the municipality of Raesfeld purchased the castle, with the exception of the coach house and the outer bailey.

The castle's outer bailey is owned by the seven chambers of crafts in North Rhine-Westphalia and the West German Chamber of Crafts. Since 1952, the main castle has been the seat of the state-recognized further education institution Academy of Crafts Castle Raesfeld. The outer bailey was restored in the 1980s and from 1982 was home to the training center for the preservation of historical monuments, which has now been absorbed into the Academy of Crafts.

The Knights' Hall has been used regularly for concerts and literary events by the Cultural Association of Raesfeld Castle since 1956, but can also be hired by private individuals. The basement of the main castle is used as a restaurant.

== Sources ==
The older history of Raesfeld Castle lies in the shadows of history and is partly based on hypotheses due to a lack of sources. Apart from the mention of the settlement "Hrothusfeld" in the Werden register of the main court of Scirenbeke (Schermbeck) in 899, the oldest documents come from the Xanten Abbey Library and the library of the diocese of Münster. The most important sources for the history from the 15th century onwards are the files, contracts, correspondence, orders and invoices in the Münster State Archives (Landsberg-Velensches Archive, war files of the Münster State Archives, Repertorium Kohl).

== Bibliography ==
- Wilhelm Avenarius: Raesfeld. In: Alte Burgen schöne Schlösser. Eine romantische Deutschlandreise. Reduced special edition. The best, Stuttgart 1980, ISBN 3-87070-278-8, p. 168–169.
- Ludger Fischer: Schloss Raesfeld (= DKV-Kunstführer. No. 587/1). German Art Publishers, Munich/Berlin 2001 (Digitized version).
- Adalbert Friedrich: Schloß Raesfeld – von der Ritterburg zum Handwerkerschloß. Raesfeld Tourist Office, Raesfeld 1990.
- Günter Kalesky: Schloß Raesfeld. In: Von Wasserburg zu Wasserburg. Bau- und Kunstgeschichtliche Studienfahrt in Westfalen. Rademann, Lüdinghausen 1976, ISBN 3-9800113-0-5, p. 53–55.
- Richard Klapheck: Die Schlossbauten zu Raesfeld und Honstorff und die Herrensitze des 17. Jahrhunderts der Maastal-Backstein-Architektur. Heimat Publisher Dortmund 1922.
- Karl Emerich Krämer: Schloß Raesfeld. In: Burgenfahrt durchs Münsterland. Dr. Wolfgang Schwarze Publisher, Düsseldorf 1975, p. 11–13.
- Ursula Schumacher-Haardt: Schloß Raesfeld (= Westfälische Kunststätten. Booklet No. 76). Westphalian Heritage Association, Münster 1995, ISSN 0930-3952.
- Volker Tschuschke: Raesfeld und seine Burgen. In: Westfälische Zeitschrift. No. 166, 2016, ISSN 0083-9043, P. 43–73 (PDF; 2,7 MB)
