= Holzheim Castle (Langerwehe) =

German castle

- Burg Holzheim
- Heistern
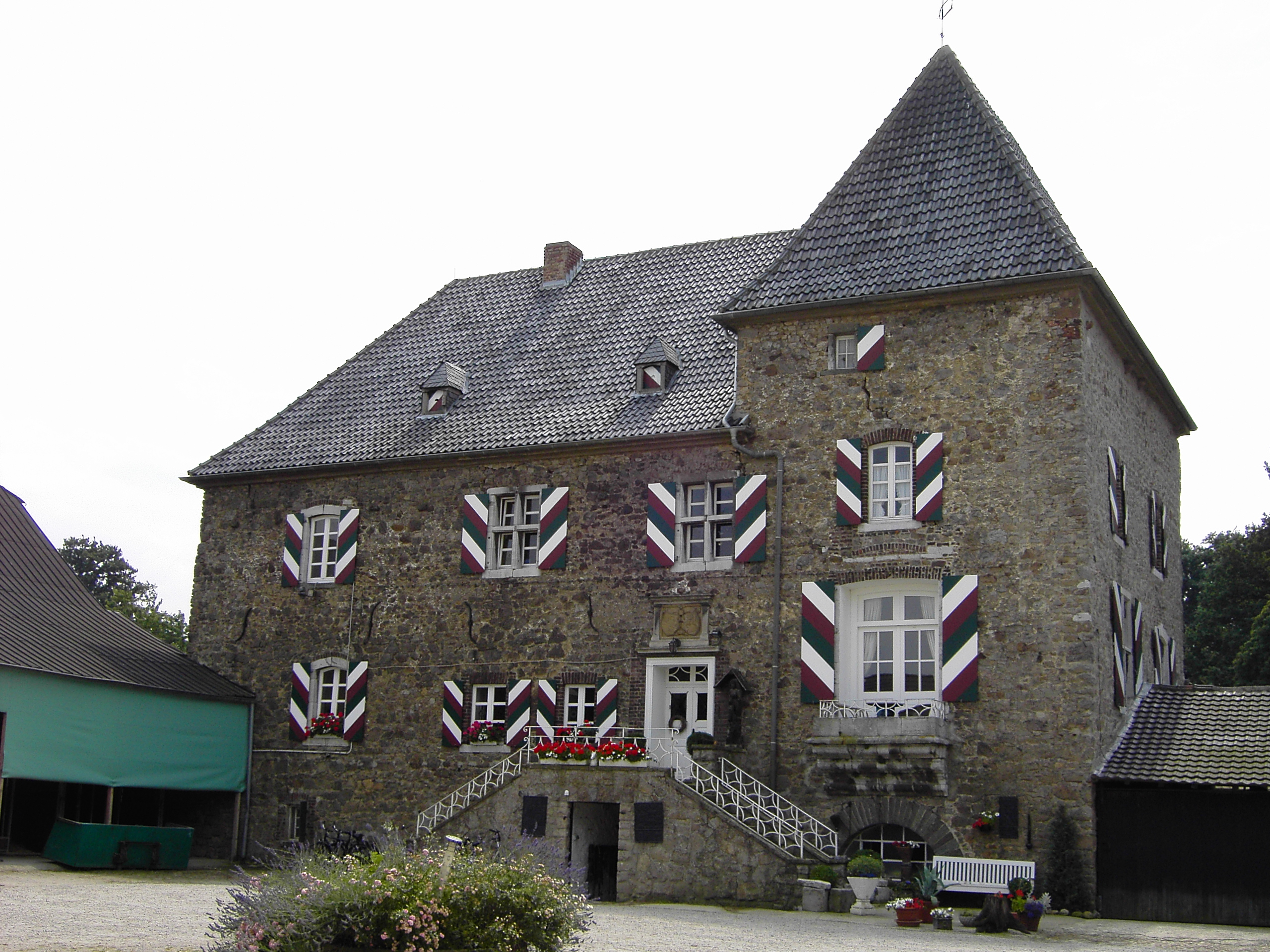

Site information
- Type: lowland castle
- Code: DE-NW
- Condition: preserved or largely preserved

Location
- Coordinates: 50°47′54″N 6°19′43″E
- Height: 224 m above sea level (NN)

Site history
- Built: 1333

Holzheim Castle (German: Burg Holzheim) is a lowland castle west of Heistern in the municipality of Langerwehe in the county of Düren in the German state of North Rhine-Westphalia. It stands between Heistern and the Bovenberg Forest near Eschweiler-Nothberg and is used today as a farm and riding estate.

A small stream, the Holzheimer Graben, runs past the castle to the east. It discharges into the Inde at Hücheln.

The castle dates to 1333, and its owners were vassals of the Duchy of Jülich. In the 15th to 17th centuries the manor house and gate tower were built, both of which have survived. In 1818, when the region was part of the Prussia county of Düren, the castle and its estates were sold to private buyers. In 1893 it was bought by Richard Schleicher, who also bought the nearby estate of Schönthal. The property later changed hands several times.
