= Ahr Hills =

Hill range in the Eifel region of Germany

Ahr Hills Ahrgebirge or Ahreifel
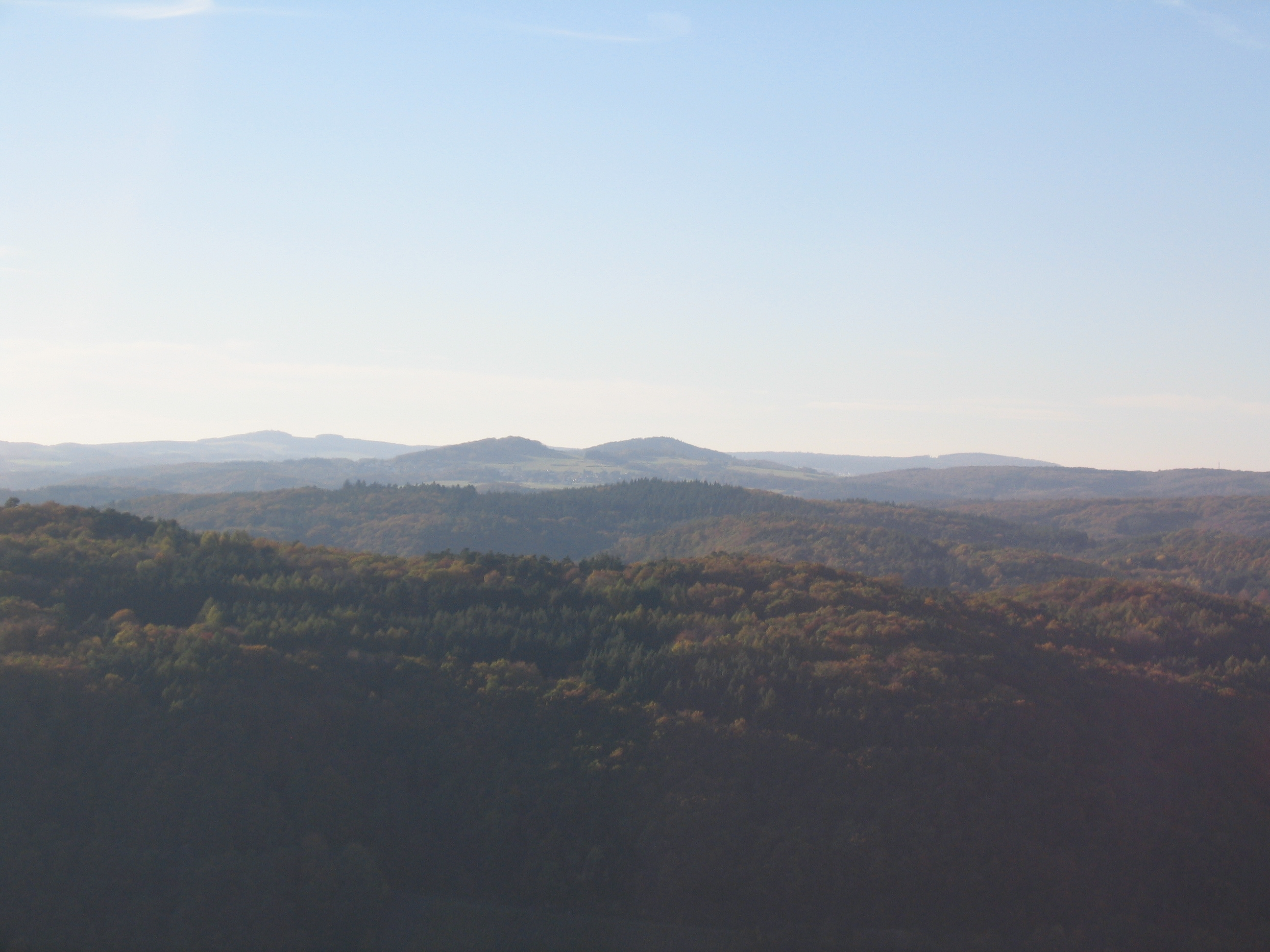
- View from the Krausberg Tower near Dernau of the Hochthürmerberg, Hasenberg and (rear) the Michelsberg

Highest point
- Peak: Aremberg
- Elevation: 623.8 m (2,047 ft)

Dimensions
- Length: 25 km (16 mi)

Geography
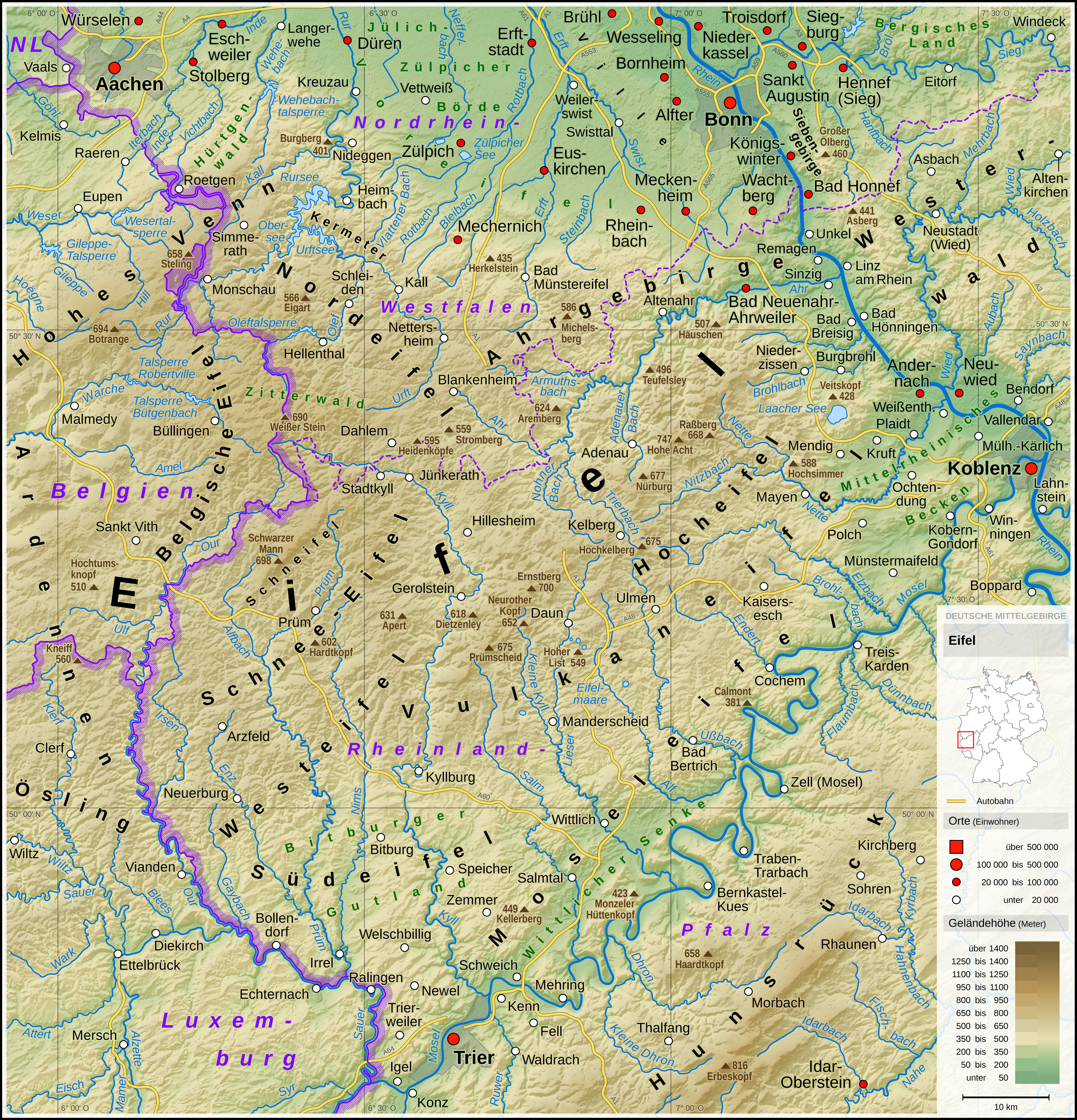
- The Eifel, etc, with the Ahr Hills (upper centre)
- State(s): North Rhine-Westphalia and Rhineland-Palatinate (Germany)
- Range coordinates: 50°30′N 6°52′E
- Parent range: Eifel

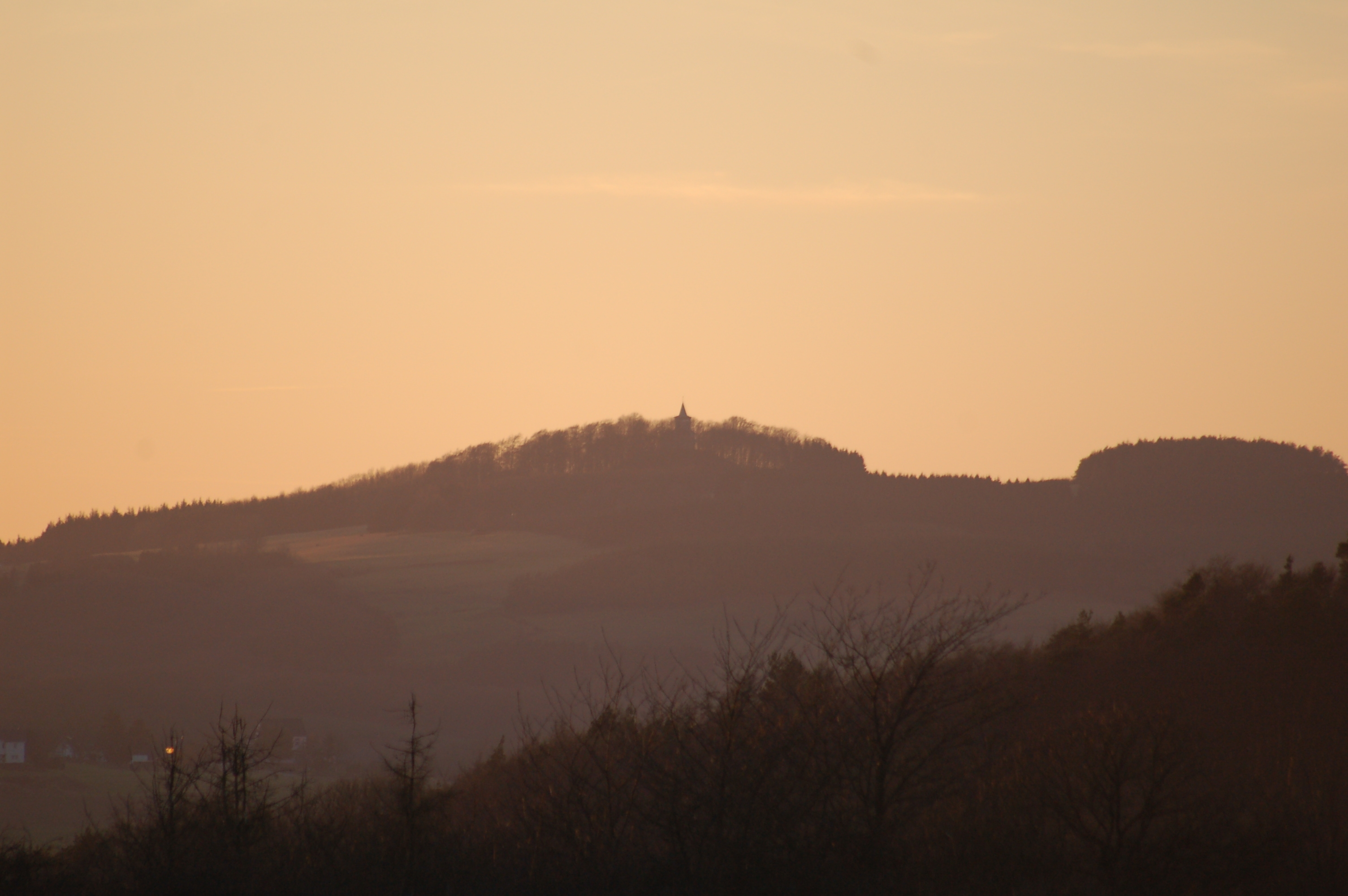
The Michelsberg and St. Michael's Chapel at dusk in the Ahr Hills

The Ahr Hills (German: Ahrgebirge [ˈaːɐ̯ɡəˌbɪʁɡə] or Ahreifel [ˈaːɐ̯ˌʔaɪfl̩]) are a range of low mountains and hills up to 623.8 m above sea level (NHN) and 25 kilometres (16 mi) long in the Eifel region of Germany, which lie roughly southwest of Bonn on the border between the German states of North Rhine-Westphalia and Rhineland-Palatinate.

The forested Ahr Hills have numerous tourist destinations (e. g. Aremberg Castle and the Effelsberg Radio Telescope) and the section of a Roman road with its ancient Eifel Aqueduct.

== Geography ==
=== Location ===
The Ahr Hills are part of the Eifel, the bulk of which lies to the south and southwest of it. It lies on the left, i.e. northwestern, bank of the river Ahr, roughly 40 km southwest of Bonn. Sometimes the ridge on the right, southeastern, bank of the Ahr in the area of Altenahr is also counted as part of the Ahr Hills. This small range is bordered by a square enclosed by the Grafschaft and Remagen to the east, by Altenahr to the southeast, Antweiler to the south, Blankenheim to the west and Bad Münstereifel and Rheinbach to the north.

To the north the terrain of the Ahr Hills descends into the Cologne Bay, to the east it drops down to the Voreifel and the valley of the Middle Rhine, to the south on the far side of the Ahr is the Eifel proper (up to 747 m), to the west the Zitter Forest and in the northwest the North Eifel.

=== Hills ===
The summits of the Ahr Hills include the:

- Aremberg (623.8 m), with Aremberg Castle - near Aremberg
- Michelsberg (586.1 m) near Mahlberg
- Junkerberg (543.4 m) - near Reetz
- Knippberg (537.3 m) – between Rodert and Scheuerheck
- Hühnerberg (Lommersdorf) (533.5 m) – near Lommersdorf
- Sommerberg (c. 527 m) – between Reetz and Rohr
- Kalvarienberg (Alendorf) (522.8 m) – near Alendorf
- Kopnück (514.4 m) – near Kop Nück
- Hochthürmerberg (499.9 m) – near Lanzerath
- Hühnerberg (Kirchsahr) (c. 398 m) – near Kirchsahr
- Tomberg (308.5 m) and the ruins of the Tomburg Castle - near Wormersdorf

=== Streams ===
The Ahr Hills is crossed by the following streams, some of which have their sources here:

- Ahr (source in Blankenheim)
- Erft (source on the western edge)
- Liersbach,
- Sahrbach,
- Steinbach
- Swist (source near Kalenborn).

In July 2021 the area was hit by severe rainfall and subsequent heavy flooding.

=== Places ===
The following towns and villages border the Ahr Hills:

- Rheinbach (north)
- Meckenheim (northeast)
- Remagen (east)
- Bad Neuenahr-Ahrweiler (south)
- Antweiler (south)
- Blankenheim (west)
- Bad Münstereifel (northwest)

Other places in the Ahr Hills include:

- Altenahr
- Ahrbrück
- Aremberg
- Effelsberg
- Grafschaft
- Hilberath
- Kalenborn
- Mahlberg
- Mutscheid
- Ohlenhard
- Odesheim
- Rupperath
- Wershofen

== Tourism ==
The Große Eifelroute ("Great Eifel Route"), a tourist route, runs through the Ahr Hills. There are also numerous footpaths for walkers. Amongst its places of interest are Aremberg Castle, on the eponymous hill above Aremberg, and the ruins of the 11th-century castle of Tomburg above Wormersdorf with views of Cologne. Near Effelsberg is the Effelsberg Radio Telescope, on the summit of the Michelsberg is a Catholic chapel, dedicated to the Archangel Michael and regularly visited by pilgrims and walkers. Part of the Roman Eifel Aqueduct, which runs through the northern part of the Ahr Hills, is a popular tourist destination. The Ahr Valley with its wine centres is also picturesque; the southeastern slopes of the Ahr Hills above the Ahr have vineyards through which one may walk on the Red Wine Trail (Rotweinwanderweg).

== See also ==
- List of mountain and hill ranges in Germany
