= Kalvarienberg =

Hill in Germany

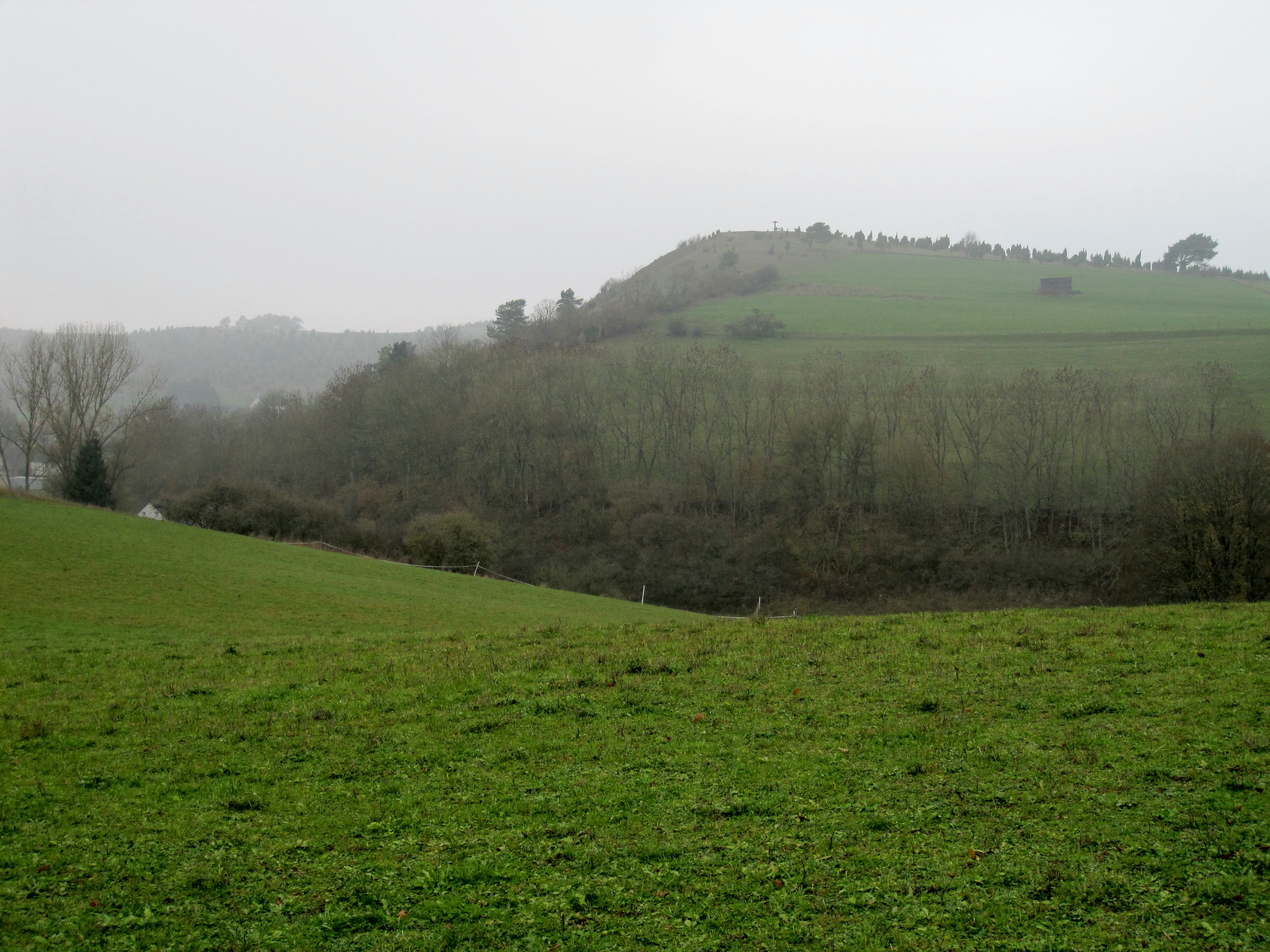
- The south side of the Kalvarienberg

Highest point
- Elevation: 522.8 m above sea level (NHN) (1,715 ft)
- Coordinates: 50°22′02″N 6°38′29″E

Geography
- Location within North Rhine-Westphalia
- Location: Blankenheim (Ahr), Euskirchen, North Rhine-Westphalia
- Parent range: Ahr Hills, Eifel

The Kalvarienberg is a 523-metre-high (1,716 ft) calvary hill in the nature reserve of Lampertstal near Alendorf, a village in the municipality of Blankenheim in the county of Euskirchen in the German state of North Rhine-Westphalia.

== History ==
Count Salentin Ernest of Manderscheid-Blankenheim (born 1630) realised the idea of an ancestor, who wanted the Alendorf countryside and the (originally so-called) hill of Kelberg to recall the original hill of Calvary in Jerusalem. Between 1663 and 1680 Salentin initially had seven Stations of the Cross - based on ancient tradition - and a chapel built on the hill. In the 19th century seven more stations were added. The chapel that stood on the site of the present-day cross no longer exists. The stations, some of which had been badly weathered, were restored with the aid of NRW Foundation for Conservation, Local History and Culture.

== Views ==
From the summit of the Kalvarienberg there is an extensive view over the Eifel region. For example, the Hohe Acht and the Nürburg, 23 kilometres away, may be seen. In addition, the surrounding villages, like Ripsdorf, can also be made out. The Alendorf Kalvarienberg is one of the so-called Eifel sights that can be seen from the North Eifel Nature Park.

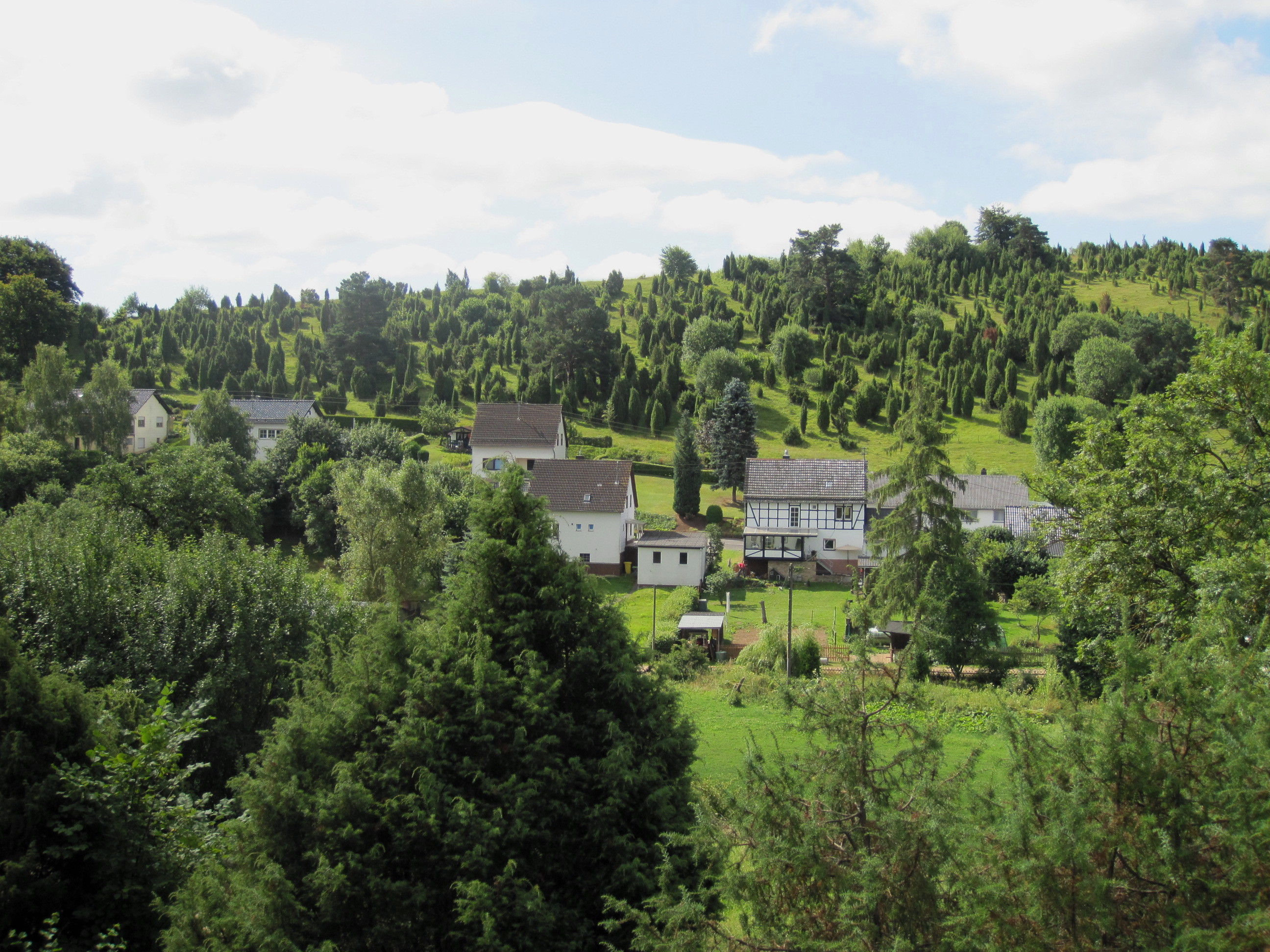
View of the Kalvarienberg at Alendorf and junipers

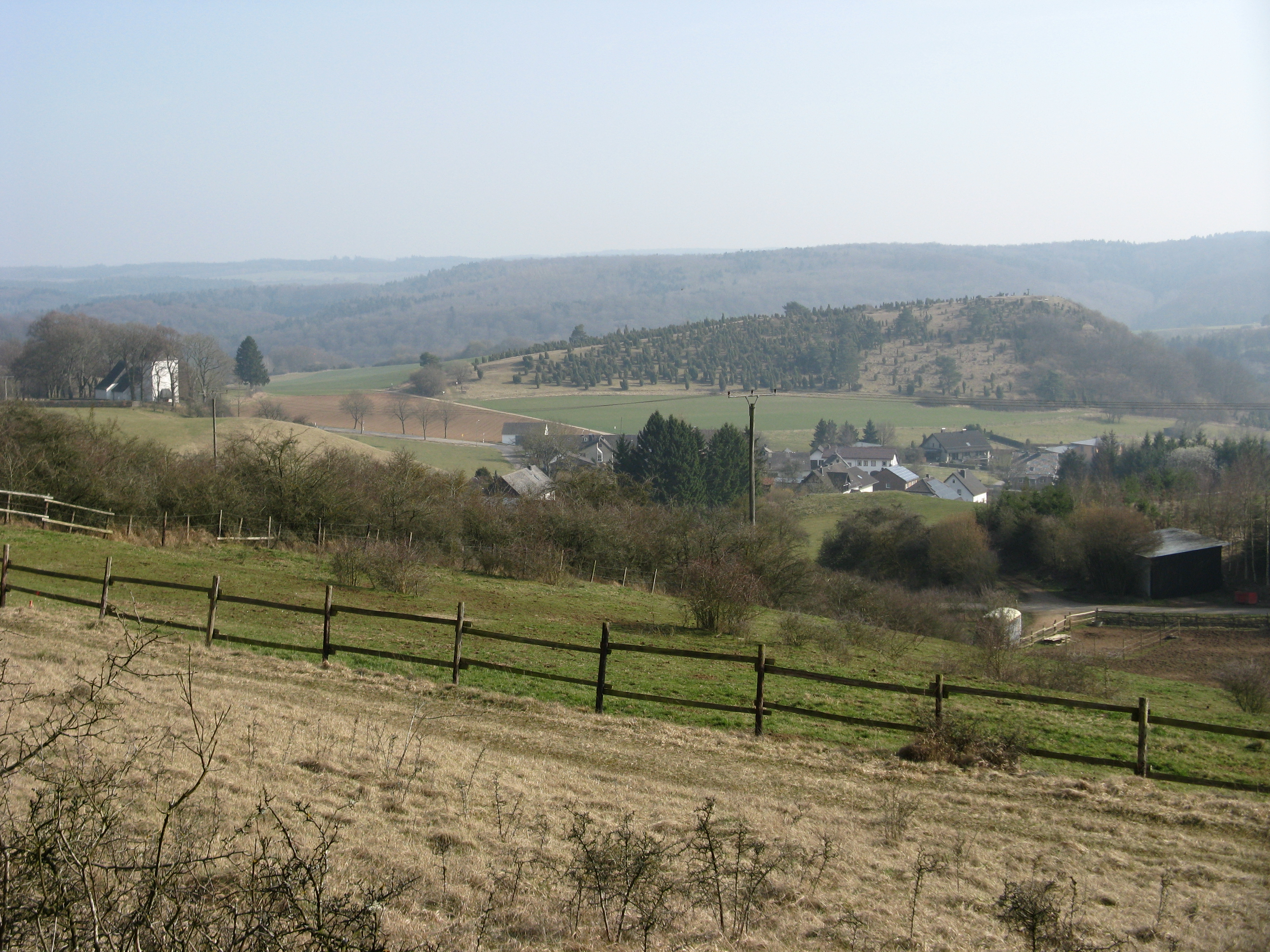
View from the Eifelsteig path of the Kalvarienberg

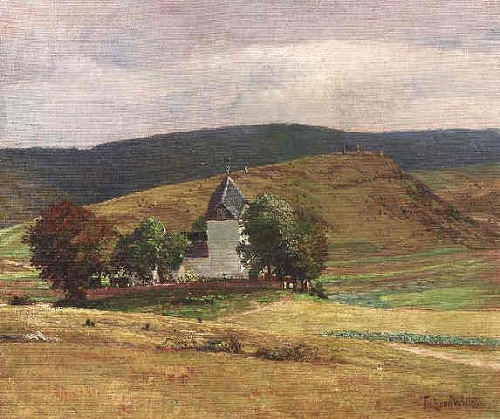
Church in Alendorf. Behind: the Kalvarienberg
(painting by Fritz von Wille)

== Pilgrimages ==
In Easter Week processions take place from the Gothic church of St. Agatha (1494) to the Alendorf Kalvarienberg. The ascent from the village is a good kilometre long. On the way, the pilgrims pass the stations of the cross that portray the suffering of Jesus Christ when he was crucified. Around the summit are more crosses, made of red sandstone. There is a total of fourteen stations.

== Vegetation ==
The hill is covered by calcareous grassland, which is kept clear by grazing sheep. At intervals of several metres from one another are juniper bushes, which dominate the appearance of the Alendorf Kalvarienberg from some distance away.
