= Hochthürmerberg =

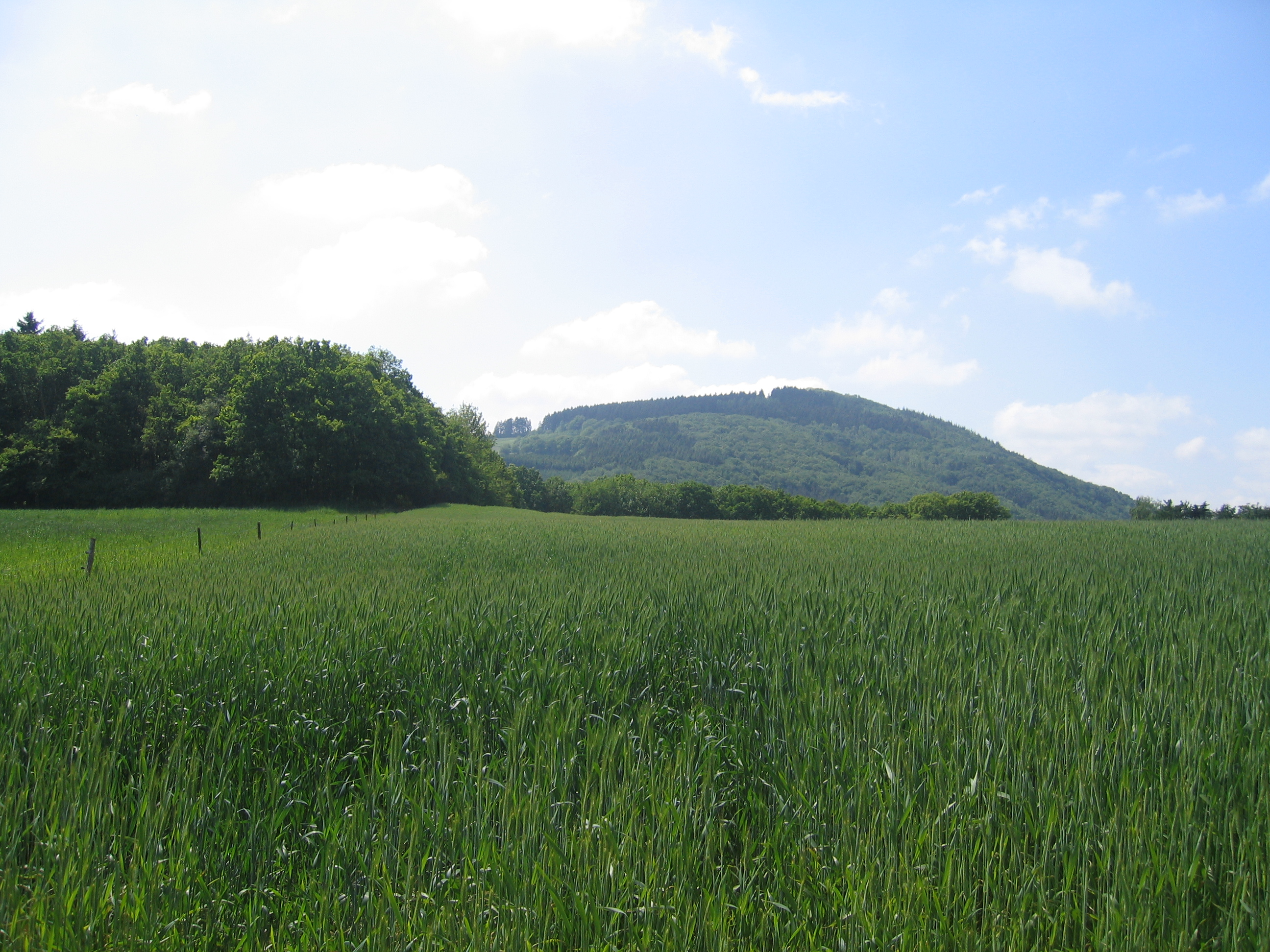
- The Hochthürmerberg seen from Houverath

Highest point
- Elevation: 499.9 m above sea level (NHN) (1,640 ft)
- Coordinates: 50°31′40″N 6°54′28″E

Geography
- Location within North Rhine-Westphalia
- Location: North Rhine-Westphalia, Germany
- Parent range: Ahr Hills (Ahr Eifel)

The Hochthürmerberg (variously also called the Hochthürmchen, Hochthürmen or Hochthürmer), is a hill, 499.9 m above sea level (NHN), in the Eifel region. It is situated in the county of Euskirchen in North Rhine-Westphalia near the state border with Rhineland-Palatinate in Deutschland.

== Location ==
The Hochthürmerberg is located within the Ahr Hills (Ahr Eifel) south of the village of Houverath in the county of Euskirchen ni North Rhine-Westphalia and northeast of the village of Kirchsahr in the county of Ahrweiler in Rhineland-Palatinate. The state border runs roughly along the 440-metre contour line over the southern flank of the hill. The Hochthürmerberg's neighbouring hill is the Hasenberg.

== Summit and viewing points ==
At the summit are the remains of a circular rampart. The summit dome is wooded and offers no views at all. However, from a section of the Ahr-Fen Way, which is located between Kirchsahr and Krälingen, there are views of the Hohe Acht, the Michelsberg, the Nürburg and even the Scharteberg and Döhmberg. Near Krälingen there is a good view of the region of the Middle and Lower Ahr; nearby rise the hills of Krausberg, Neuenahrer Berg and the neighbouring Hasenberg.
