= Michelsberg (Eifel) =

Hill in North Rhine-Westphalia, Germany

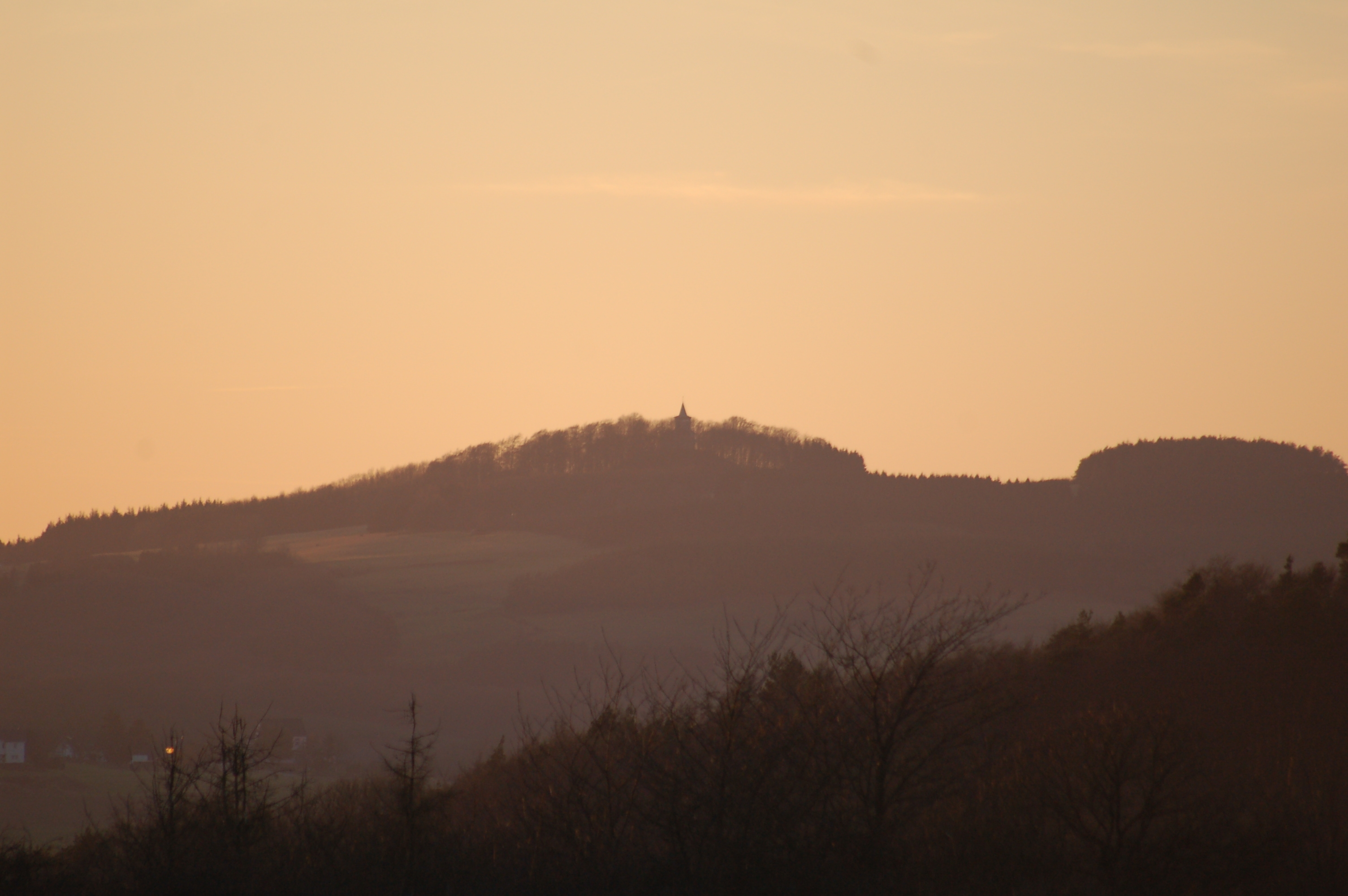
- View from the Hochthürmerberg looking west-southwest to the Michelsberg with the tower of the St. Michael's Chapel at dusk

Highest point
- Elevation: 586.1 m above sea level (NHN) (1,923 ft)
- Coordinates: 50°30′45″N 6°49′27″E

Geography
- Location within North Rhine-Westphalia
- Location: Near Mahlberg; Euskirchen, North Rhine-Westphalia (Germany)
- Parent range: Ahr Hills, Eifel

Michelsberg, Eifel mit Wallfahrtskapelle St. Michael

The Michelsberg, at 586.1 m above sea level (NHN), is the highest point in the borough of Bad Münstereifel in the county of Euskirchen in the German state of North Rhine-Westphalia. The hill, which rises near the village of Mahlberg belongs to that part of the Eifel mountains known as the Ahr Hills (Ahreifel), and is the second highest point in the range.

== Geography ==
=== Location ===
The Michelsberg rises on the northwestern edge of the Ahr Hills in the High Fens-Eifel Nature Park. Its summit lies 1.2 km east-northeast of the centre of Mahlberg, which extends to the southwestern flank of the hill, and 1.5 km west-northwest of Reckerscheid. Some distance away to the south is the village of Esch with its hamlet of Wasserscheide. All these villages belong to the borough of Bad Münstereifel.

=== Natural regional classification ===
The Michelsberg lies within the natural regional major unit group of East Eifel (Osteifel, no. 27) on the boundary of its southern subdivision, the Northern Ahr Hill Country (Nördliches Ahrbergland, 272.1) which belongs to the Ahr Eifel (Ahreifel, 272), with its northern subdivision, the Münstereifel Forest (Münstereifeler Wald, 274.1), which belongs to the major unit of Münstereifel Forest and Northeastern Foot of the Eifel (Münstereifeler Wald und Nordöstlicher Eifelfuß, 274). The western slopes of the hill drop into the subunit of the Münstereifel Valley (Münstereifeler Tal, 274.0).

=== Height and upland location ===
According to a trig point marked on the German base map, the Michelsberg is 586.1 m. Its summit, whose height is also given as 588 m, is located on the middle of three tops or kuppen. From the main top, the countryside runs via a saddle at 564.6 m to the Michelsberg North Top, also called the Hohberg (574.5 m). To the southwest is another top, 573.5 m. In topographic maps of the Bundesamt für Naturschutz the summit region is also given a height of 566.1 m.

=== Rivers and watershed ===
The watershed between the rivers Ahr and Erft runs over the Michelsberg. Among the rivers and streams that rise on or near the hill are: in the west the Schußbach, whose waters reach the Erft via the Waldbach which rises northwest of the hill. Flowing directly into the Erft in the same direction is the Krumesbach whose source lies to the south. Near its origin rises the Buchholzbach (Trinkpützsiefen, Escher Bach, Lamersbach) which sends its waters down the Armuthsbach south-southeastwards into the Ahr. The Liersbach (Rosensiefen) rises north of the hill and also flows southeastwards.

== History ==
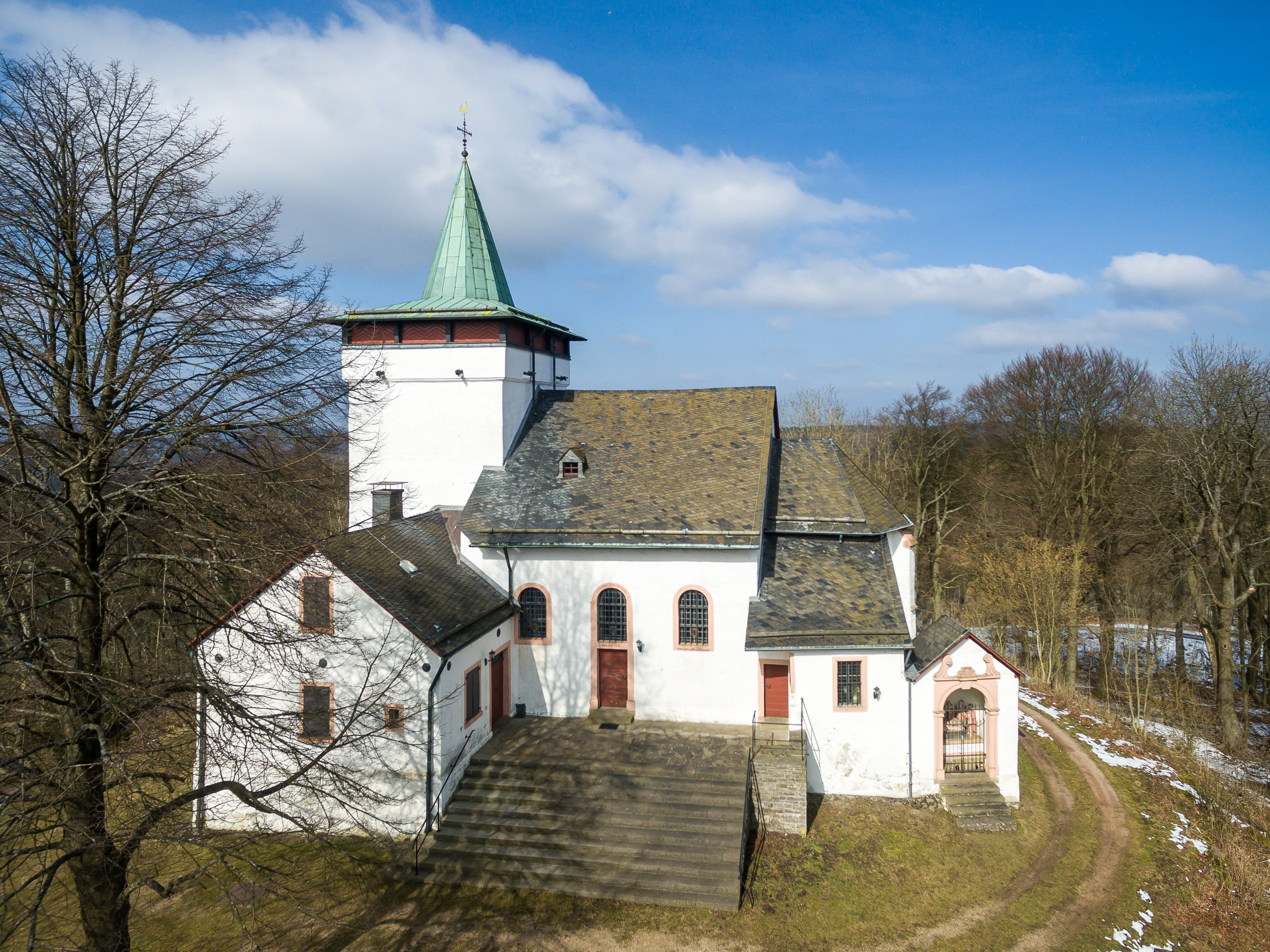
Chapel of St. Michael

Hunters and gatherers settled on and around the Michelsberg in early times, as evinced by numerous artefact finds (microliths etc.). Archaeologists date them to the Middle Stone Age (9,600 to 5,500/4,500 B. C.). Most of these artefacts are displayed in the Hürten Museum in Bad Münstereifel. In Celtic, Roman and Germanic times the hill was a pagan cultic and juridical site as its former name Mahlberg testifies. Until about 800 A.D. there were sacrificial fires (Opferfeuer) here. After the people adopted Christianity the pagan name was transferred to the nearby village of Mahlberg, while the hill was now consecrated to the Archangel Michael, the guardian of Christianity.

On the southwest flank of the hill is a transmission mast/-tower and, nearby, a water tank.

== Pilgrimage ==
The Michelsberg has been a destination for pilgrims for centuries as the make their traditional pilgrimage annually on 29 September. They make their way along the Stations of the Cross to the Roman Catholic Chapel of St. Michael at the summit.

== Reserves ==
Parts of the protected landscape (LSG) of the Mutscheid Upland (Mutscheider Hochfläche, CDDA no. 555558861; established 2008; 48.9083 km² in area) lie on the Michelsberg. Another one, the LSG Fließgewässer, Auen und Hangbereiche im Bad Münstereifeler Tal (CDDA no. 555558740; 2008; 3.5523 km²) reaches up to its hillsides.

== Hiking, transport, leisure ==
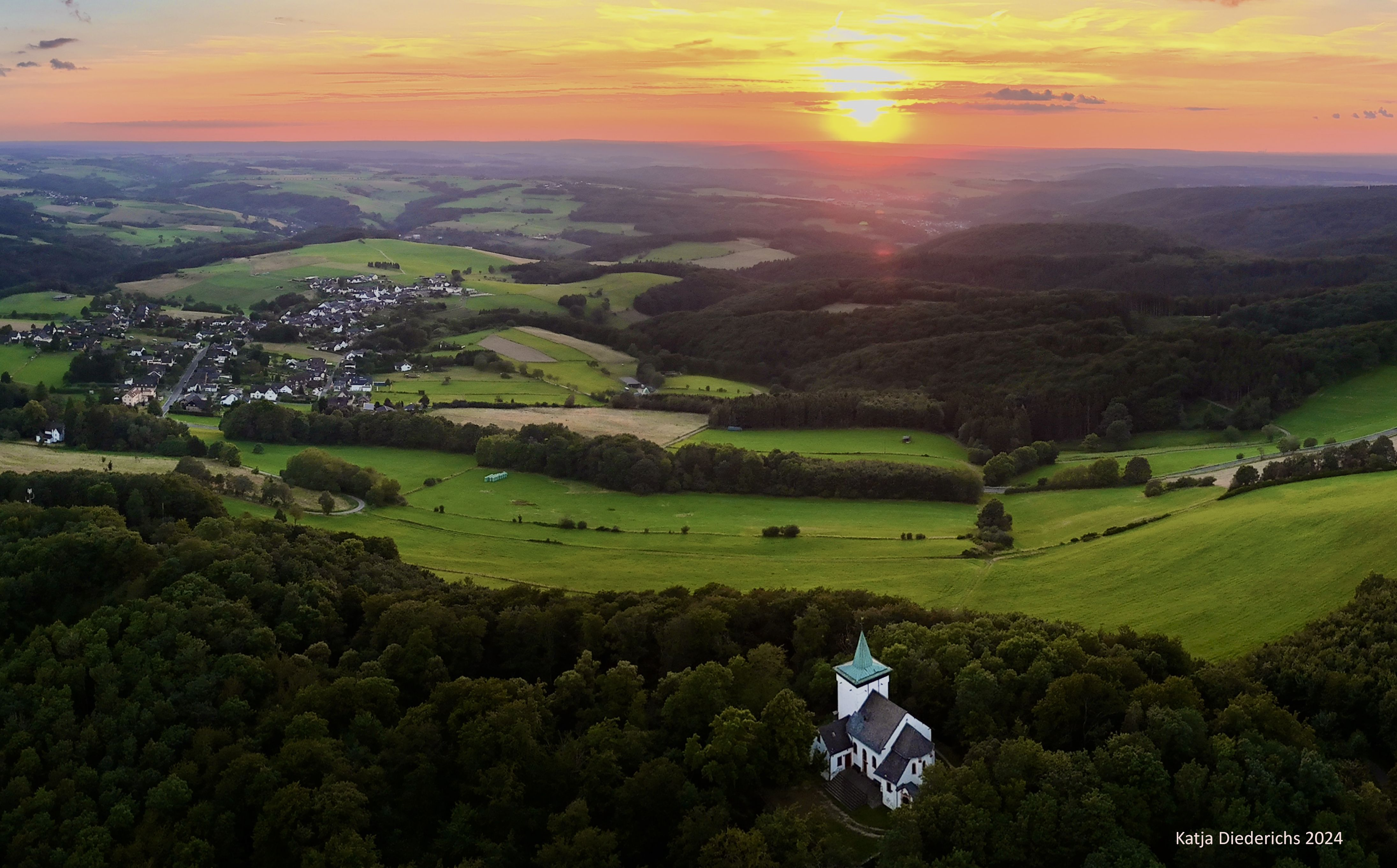
Mount Michelsberg, St Michael's pilgrimage chapel with a view towards Mahlberg at sunset, 2024

The Michelsberg is often a destination for hikers and, is popular even when it snows because the grass-covered slopes are ideal for tobogganing and the paths in the vicinity of the hill are suitable for langlauf skiing. Running past the hill to the west is the Landesstraße 113 from Mahlberg to Scheuerheck) and, to the southeast, is the Kreisstraße 50 from Mahlberg to Reckerscheid.

From the viewing platform of the chapel tower there is an all-round view that reaches to the Siebengebirge hills, the basalt kuppen of the Hohe Acht, the Hochthürmerberg and Aremberg hills as well as the Schneifel and Rur Eifel regions. In good visibility even the towers on Cologne Cathedral, about 50 kilometres away, may be visible.

== Literature ==
- Jahrbuch Kreis Euskirchen 1988 – Zwei mesolithische Fundstellen im Kreis Euskirchen, Edgar Fass, Euskirchen, 1988
- Rheinisches Landesmuseum Bonn, Fundbericht Nr. 25 – 58500-5597500, dated 22 April 1983
