= Aremberg (mountain) =

Mountain in Rhineland-Palatinate, Germany

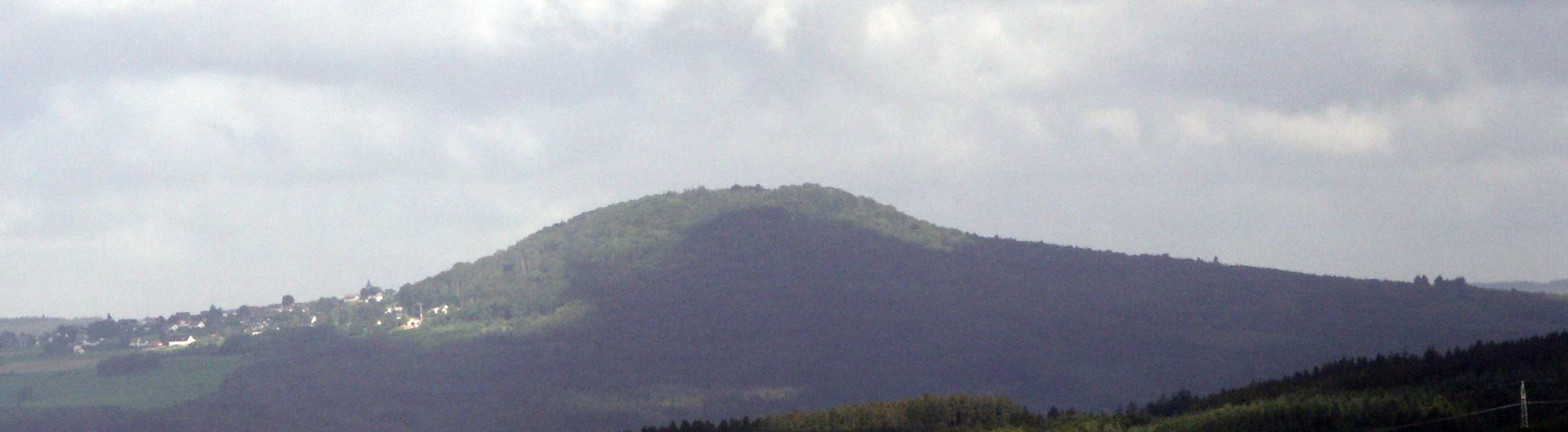
- The Aremberg with the village of Aremberg seen roughly from the direction of Barweiler i.e. south-southeast

Highest point
- Elevation: 623 m above sea level (NN) (2,044.0 ft)
- Coordinates: 50°25′02″N 6°48′51″E

Geography
- Location within Rhineland-Palatinate
- Location: Rheinland-Pfalz, Germany (Site of the ruins of Aremberg Castle)
- Parent range: Ahr Hills (Ahr Eifel)

Geology
- Rock age: Tertiary
- Mountain type: volcano
- Rock type: Basalt

The Aremberg is, at 623 m above sea level (NN), the highest mountain in the Ahr Hills (German: Ahrgebirge) or Ahr Eifel (Ahreifel). It lies in the district of Ahrweiler, Rhineland-Palatinate (Germany).

== Geographic location ==
This former Tertiary volcano rises in the northwestern part of the state of Rhineland-Palatinate, around 2.25 kilometres (1.40 mi) east of its border with North Rhine-Westphalia and belongs to the volcanic region of the High Eifel. On its southwestern slopes lies the village of Aremberg and, at its southeastern foot, the village of Antweiler. The basalt cone is surrounded by the small nature reserve of Aremberg.

A section of the middle reaches of the River Ahr flows past the Aremberg to the east; to the north an Ahr tributary, the Eichenbach, flows around the mountain.

== Aremberg Castle ==
On the summit are a few ruins belonging to Aremberg Castle, once a mighty fortress, below and north of the mountaintop runs a section of Roman road.

== Nürburgring Nordschleife ==
A section of the Nürburgring-Nordschleife racing track, from which the Aremberg can be seen, is named after the mountain.

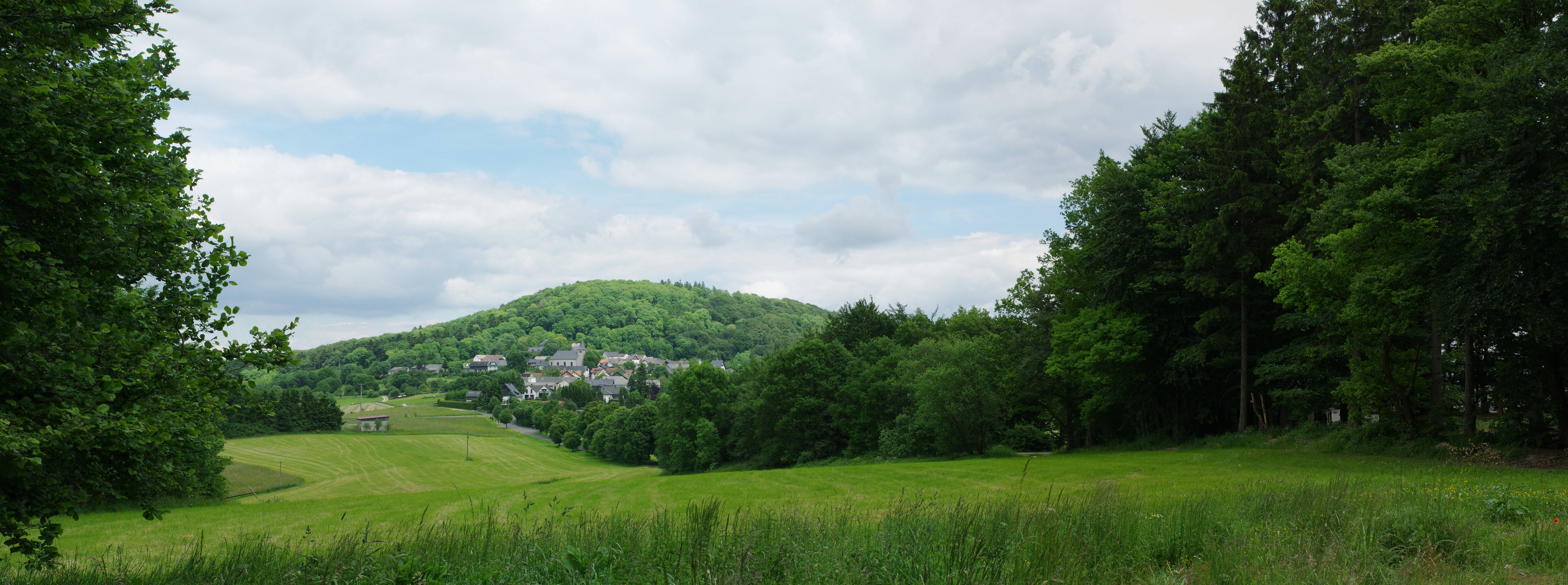
View of the village and the volcanic cone of Aremberg from the playing field of the Schullandheim
