= Aremberg Castle =

Ruined mediaeval hill castle in Germany

- Burg Aremberg
- Aremberg
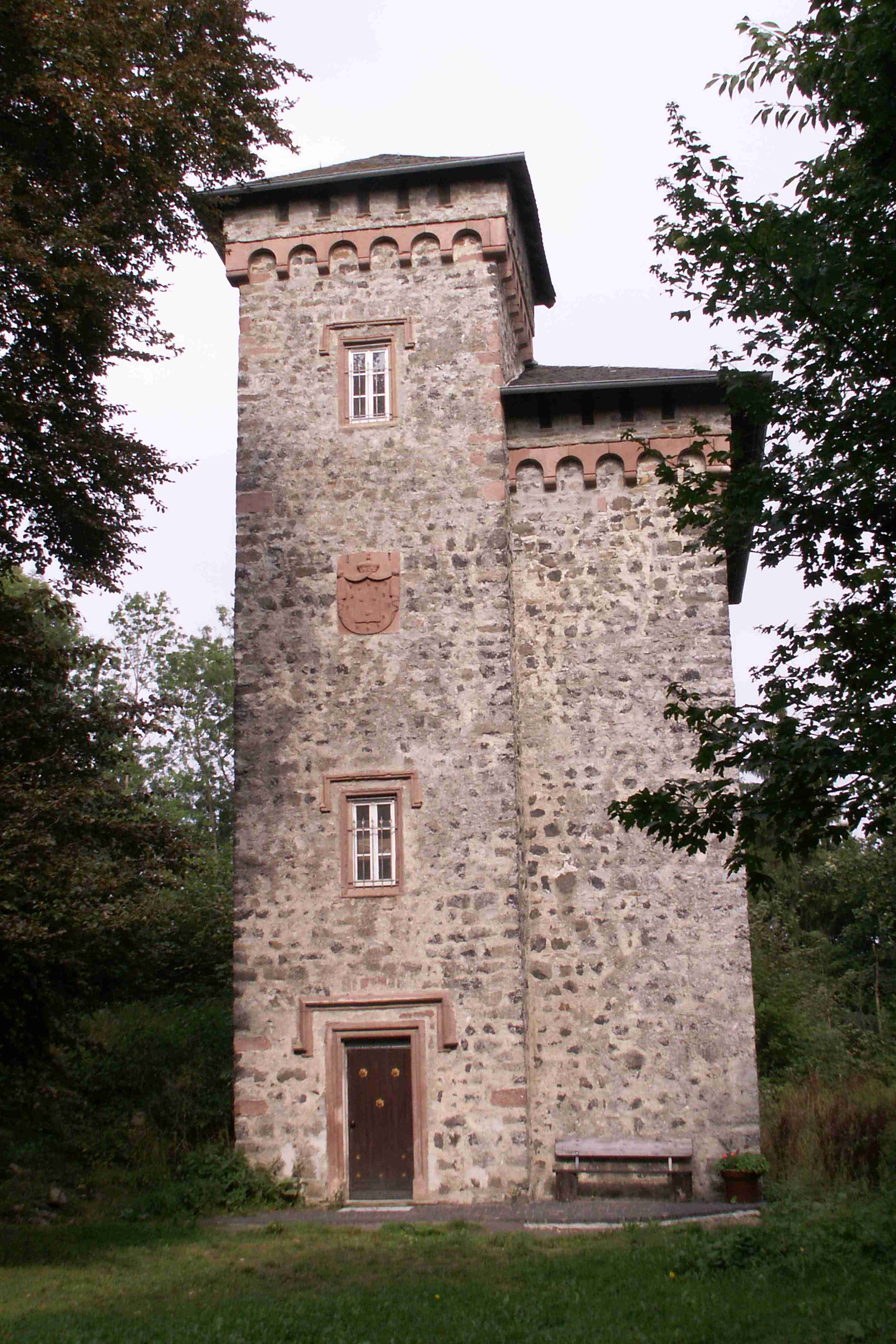
- Viewing tower, built in 1854 from the ruins

Site information
- Type: hill castle
- Code: DE-RP
- Condition: Remains of moat, walls and bastions

Location
- Location within Rhineland-Palatinate Location within Germany
- Coordinates: 50°25′1.9″N 6°48′51.2″E
- Height: 623 m above sea level (NHN)

Site history
- Built: First recorded 1166

Garrison information
- Occupants: nobility

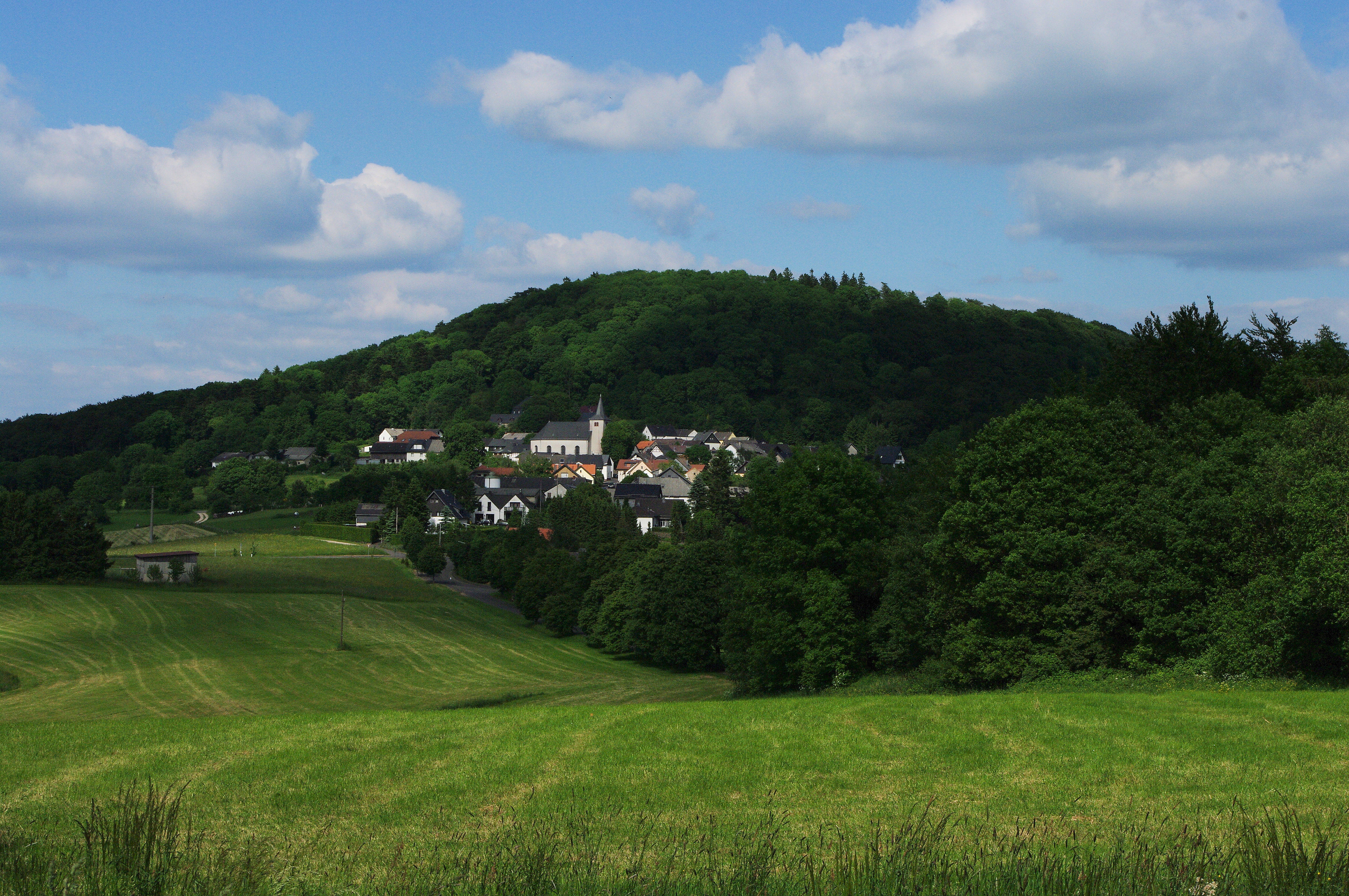
View from the sports field of a country hostel looking NE towards Aremberg Castle and the village of Aremberg

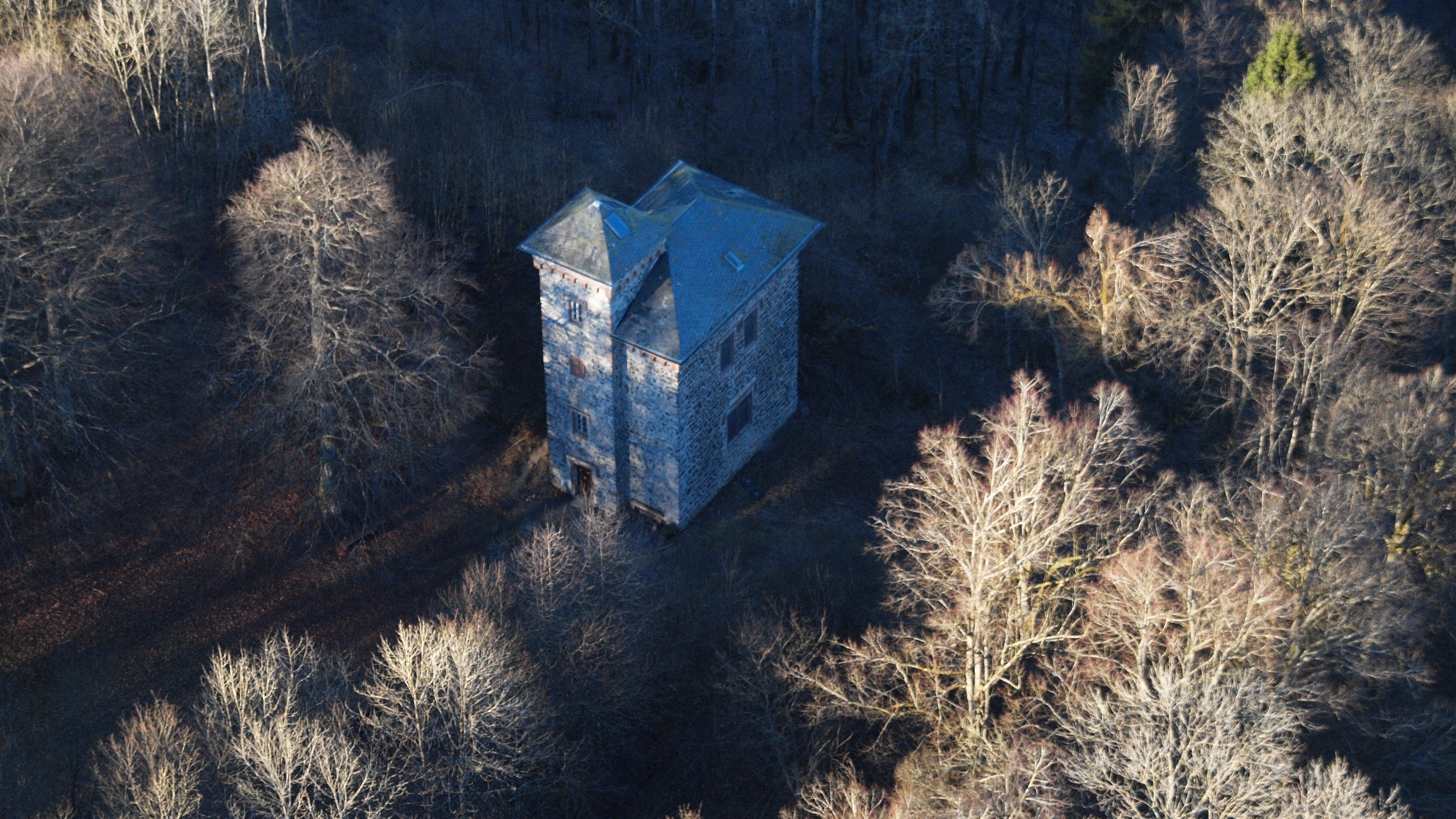
Viewing tower (2014 aerial photo)

Aremberg Castle (German: Burg Aremberg) is a ruined mediaeval hill castle on the Aremberg in the Ahr Hills in the Eifel region in Germany. The ruins lie near Aremberg in the county of Ahrweiler in the German state of Rhineland-Palatinate.

== Location ==
The castle ruins lie on the thickly wooded mountain of Aremberg (623.8 m above sea level (NHN),) one of the largest Tertiary volcanoes in the Eifel, in the vicinity of the settlement of Aremberg. The village itself is on the western mountainside, below the summit dome.

== Castle site ==
The castle is first mentioned in 1166, then under the name of Arberg. In the 12th century, a castle was built on the mountain because it was a good strategic location.

Aremberg Castle was the centre of the imperially immediate Barony of Arenberg, whose family still flourishes today in Belgium and South America and possesses considerable wealth. Although the lordship was very small in area, numerous family members managed to exert great influence at the court in Vienna, so that the family rose from counts to princes and ultimately to dukes. The (sparse) remains of the Aremberg castle that survive today barely hint at this former glory. The main residences of the dukes were in the Southern Netherlands, Arenberg castle in Heverlee and the famous Enghien Gardens.

From 1564 onwards, the castle was fundamentally renovated and expanded by the Jülich fortress architect (presumably Johann I.) von Pasqualini. In 1642, it was besieged by Hessian troops under Major General Rosen. The capture of the fortification was prevented by the relief of Spanish troops under Count Ernst von Isenburg.

As a loyal partisan of the Habsburg emperor, the Arenbergs achieved a continuous elevation in rank from Imperial Count (1549) to sovereign ducal status (1644). The early modern fortification construction on the Aremberg should also be seen in this context. This expansion was initiated, designed (1642/3) and directed by the Capuchin friar Antoine of Arenberg (1593–1669), an uncle of the first duke, Philippe François of Arenberg. Father Antoine was the fabricien (master builder) of the Flemish provincial order, where he built the Capuchin monasteries of Tervuren and Brussels. In 1660, Father Mansuet from Neufchâteau took over as construction supervisor, assisted by Lieutenant Billaut. By 1674, the construction of the fortress was considered complete.

In 1679, following the Peace of Nijmegen, the duke discharged his garrison troops, which proved fatal. Three years later, the castle — now virtually defenceless — was captured by French troops under Jehannot de Bartillat. In the process, they seized, among other things, 46 iron cannons, around 10,000 pounds of gunpowder, over 3,300 iron cannonballs, approximately 4,000 grenades, and 306 muskets. Vauban inspected the fortress and reached the damning conclusion that there was no reason for the French king to maintain a fortress here. Nevertheless, the French pursued plans to expand the fortress as a base for 2,000–3,000 soldiers. However, a serious mishap occurred when a poorly executed demolition significantly altered the water balance of the Aremberg, causing all the castle's wells to run dry. As a result, the occupiers abandoned the site after just one year, rendering the fortress unusable through large-scale demolitions.

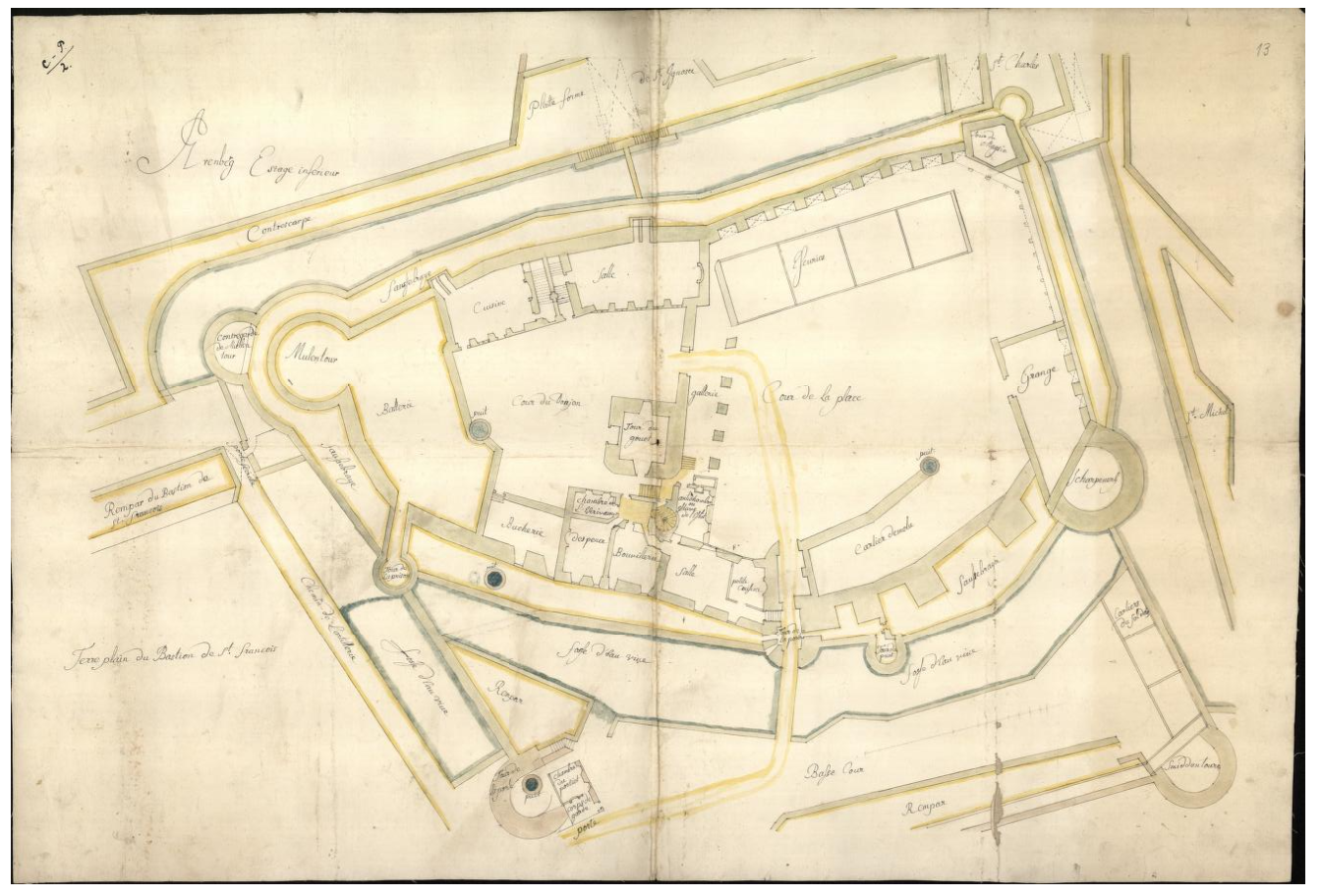
Floorplan of the medieval castle at the start of the 17th century

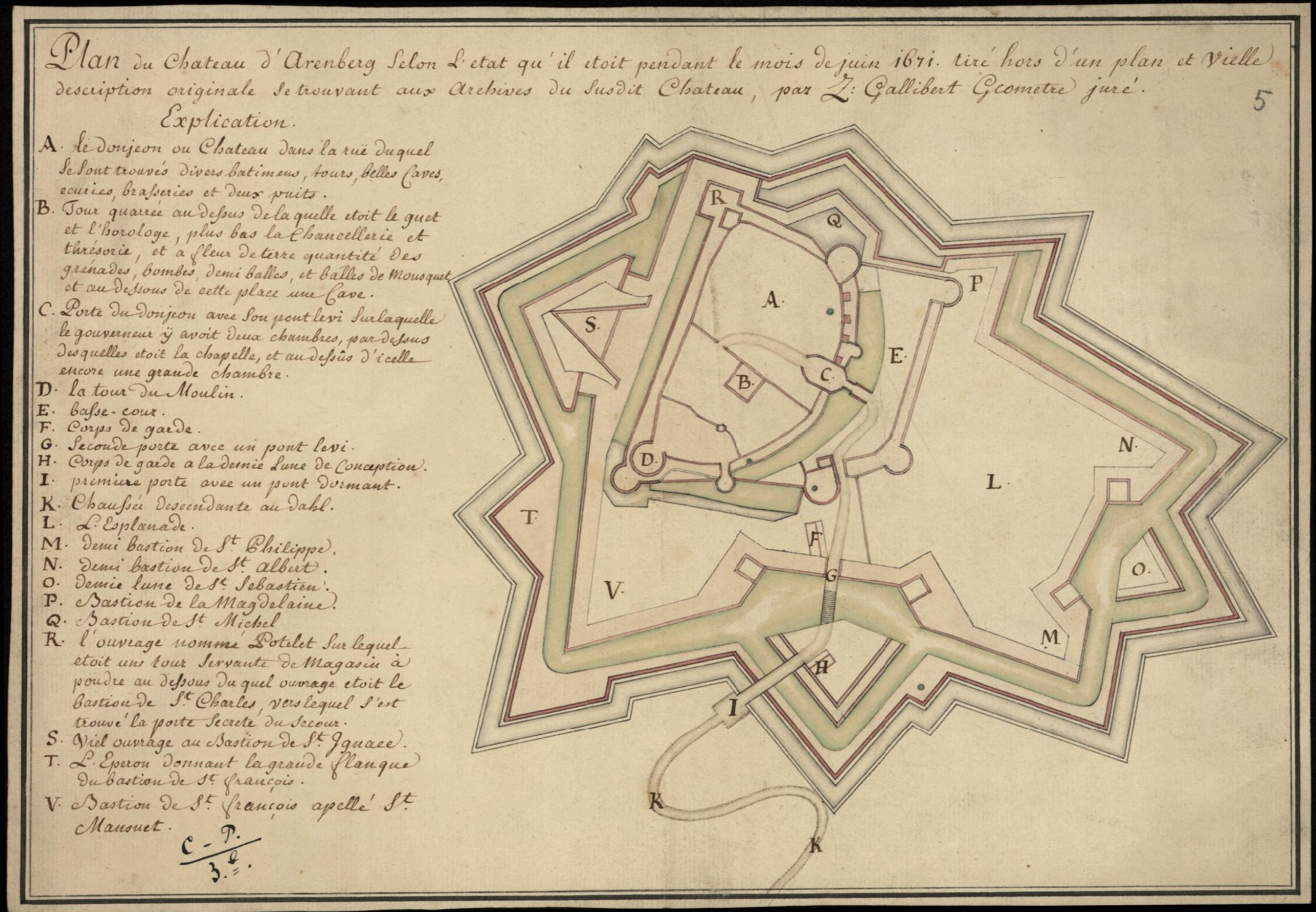
During the 17th century, the castle was transformed into a fortress (1671)

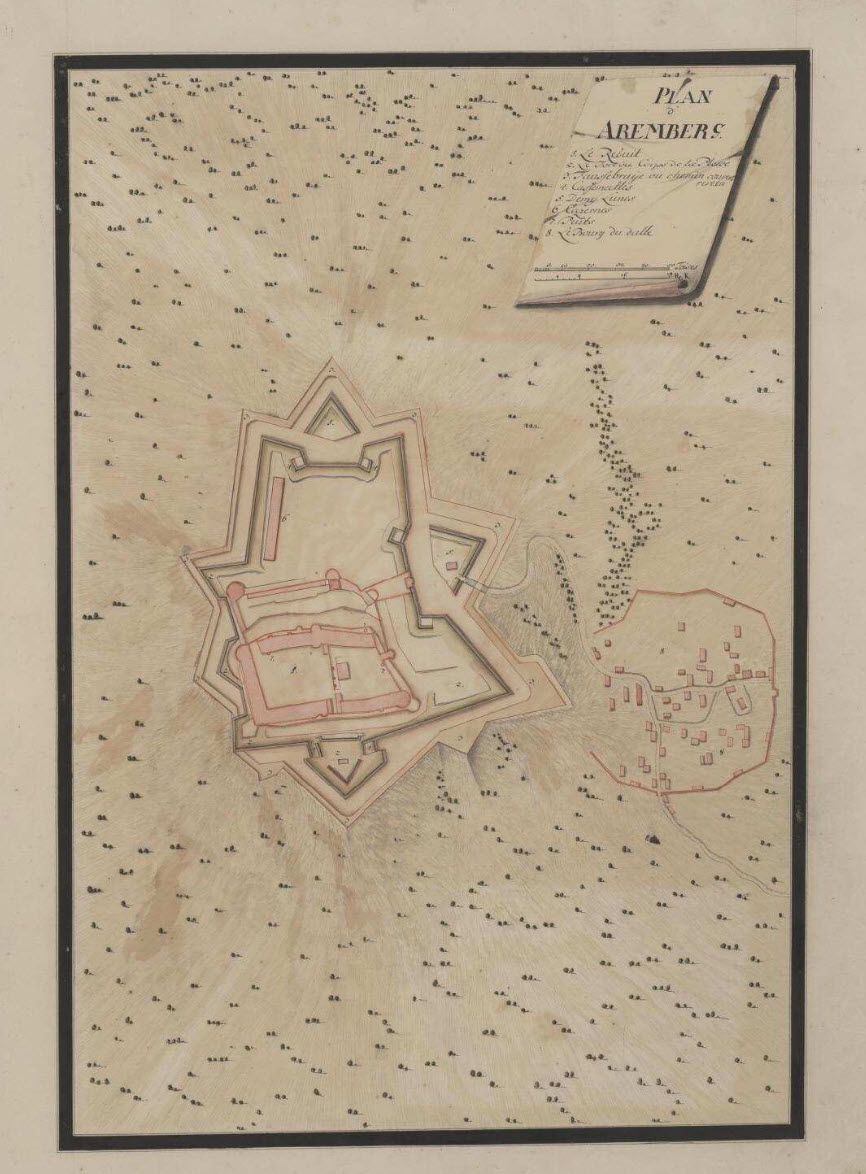
Aremberg fortress and village (1730s)

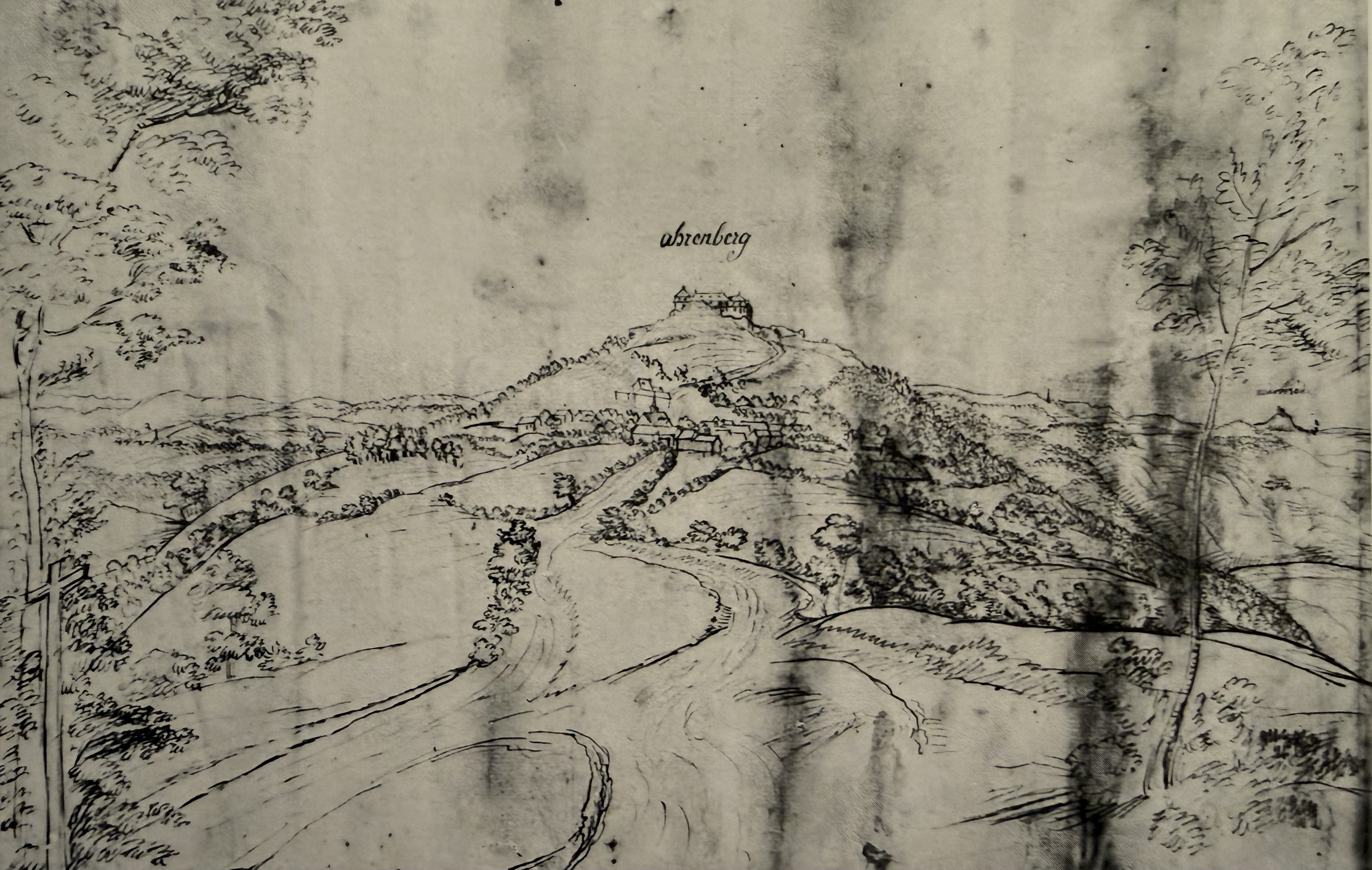
Aremberg castle and village by Renier Roidkin (1730s)

== Schloss ==
Around 1720 the castle was rebuilt by the fourth duke, Léopold Philippe, and turned into a schloss. Around 1750 and in the second half of the 18th century, various plans were made to construct a new palace in the village itself or in the valley below the Aremberg hill, but these were never realized.

On 13 October 1794 came the next setback. As a foretaste of the antics of French revolutionary troops, a French soldier demanded that his general, a commissioner and several officers be accommodated in the castle. As a result, the duke and his family moved their estate to the Netherlands. Finally, in 1803, Jean Gaspard Villmart bought the "castle on the Aremberg" and had it demolished in 1809. Remains from all periods of construction are preserved, such as the moat and bank, bastions of the fortress as well as twelve lime trees in the old castle garden.

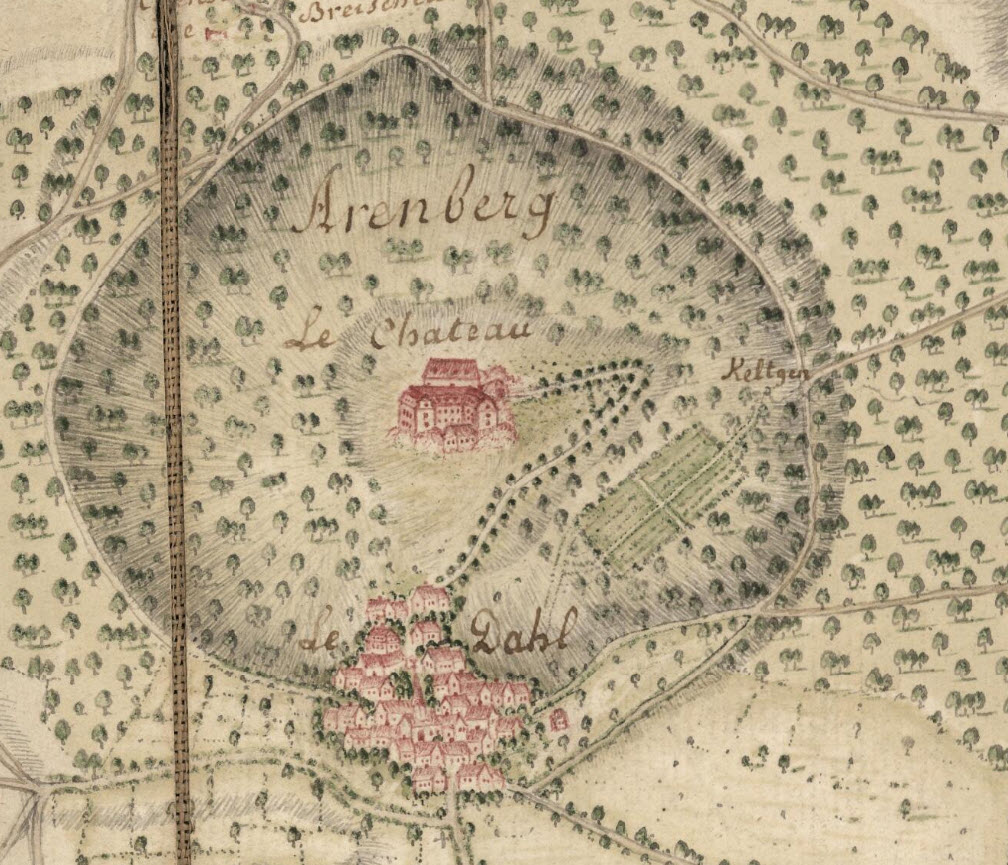
Around 1720s , the 4th Duke of Arenberg constructed a new castle on the remains of the destroyed fortress

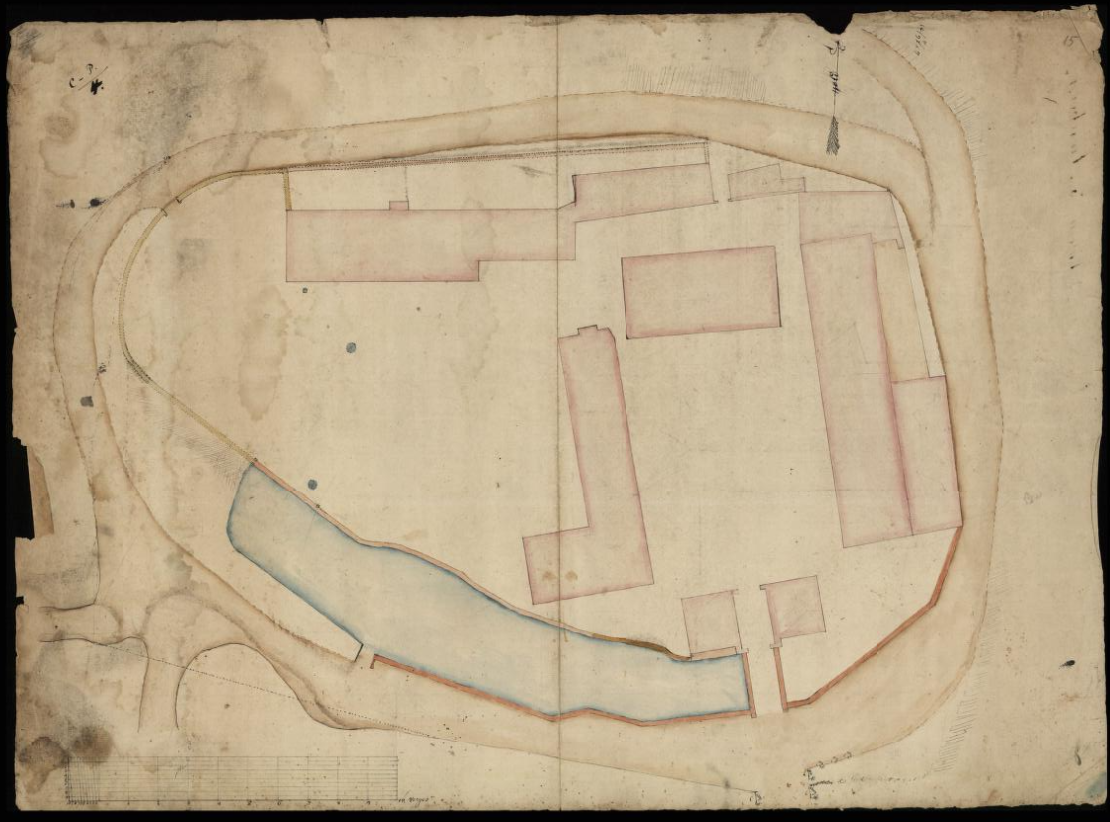
18th century plan of the Aremberg castle

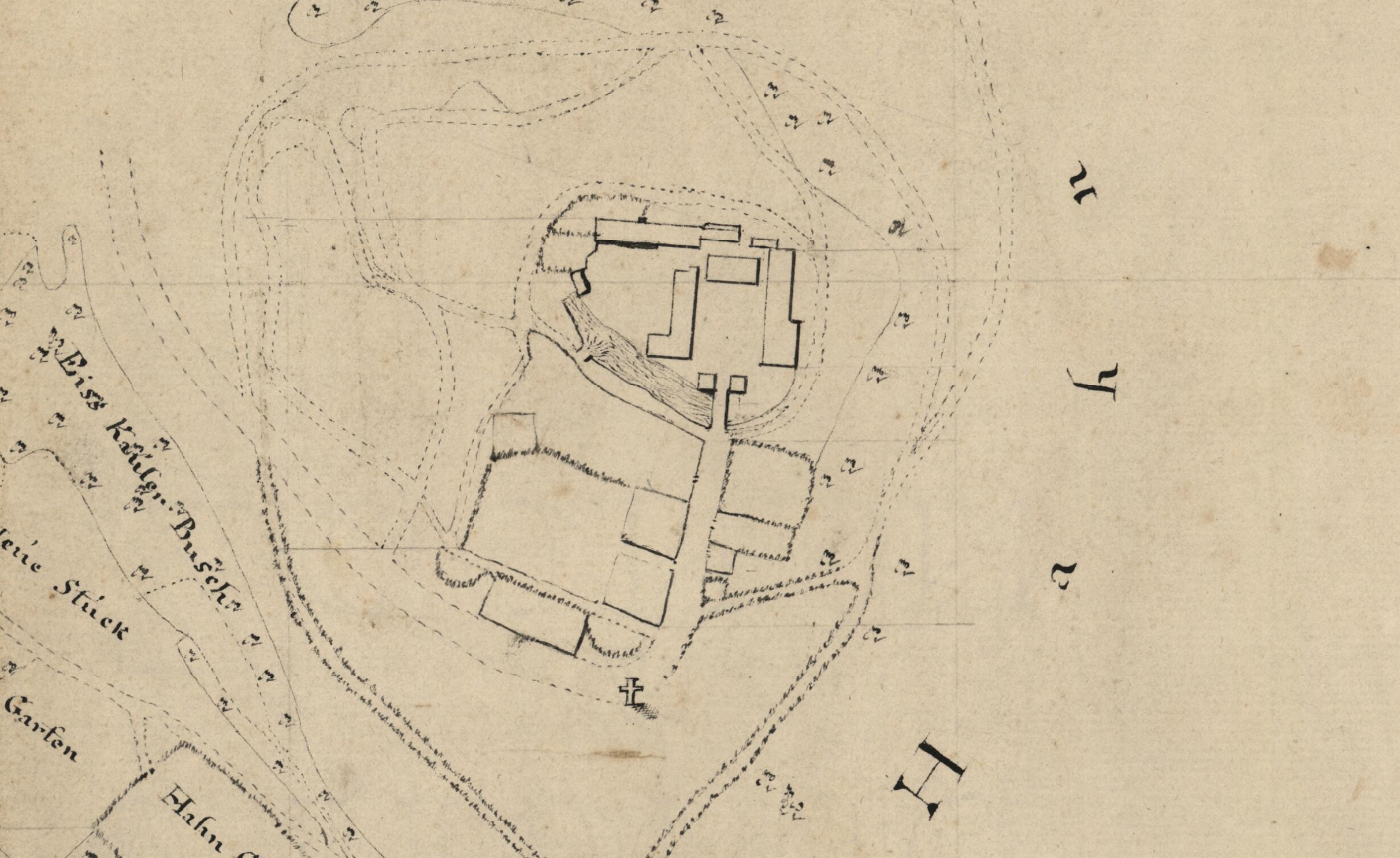
Another 18th century plan of Aremberg castle

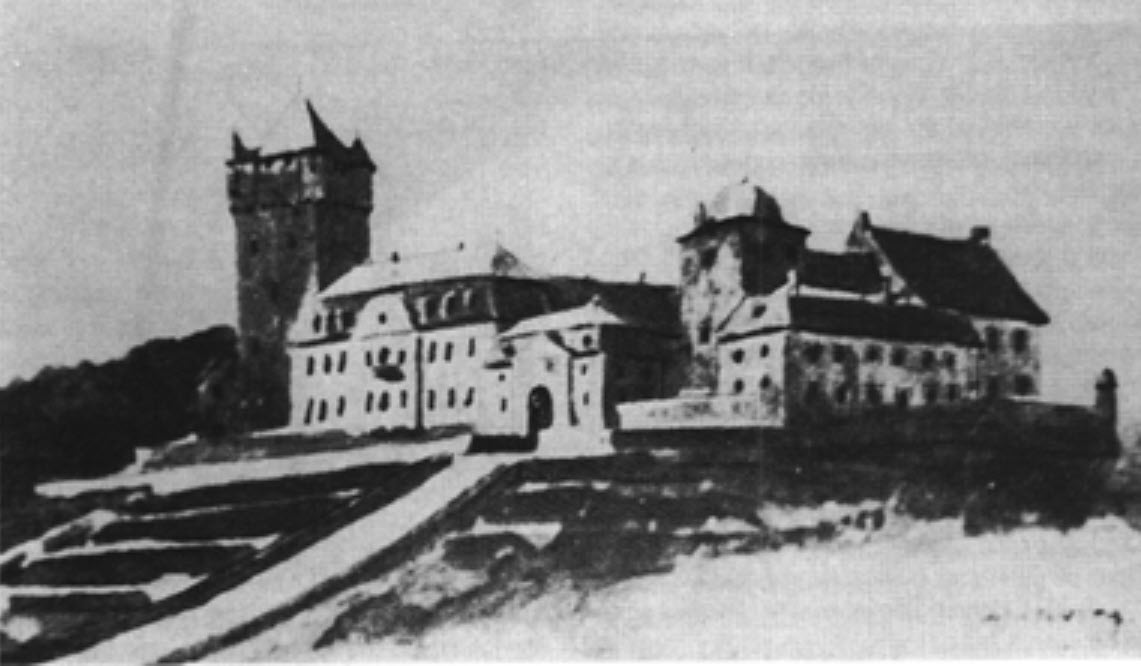
Aremberg castle at the end of the 18th century

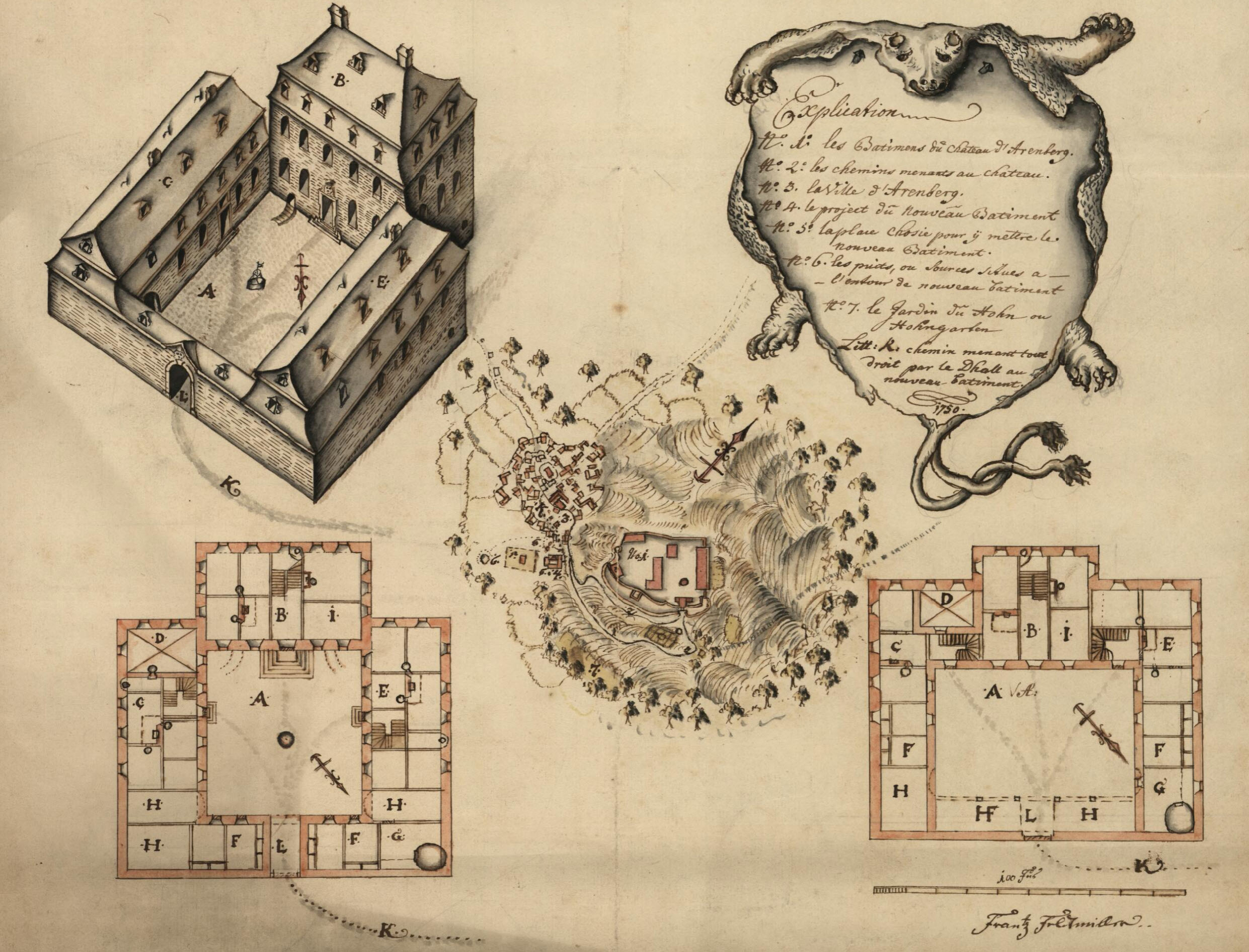
Around 1750, a plan was drafted to construct a new palace in Aremberg village

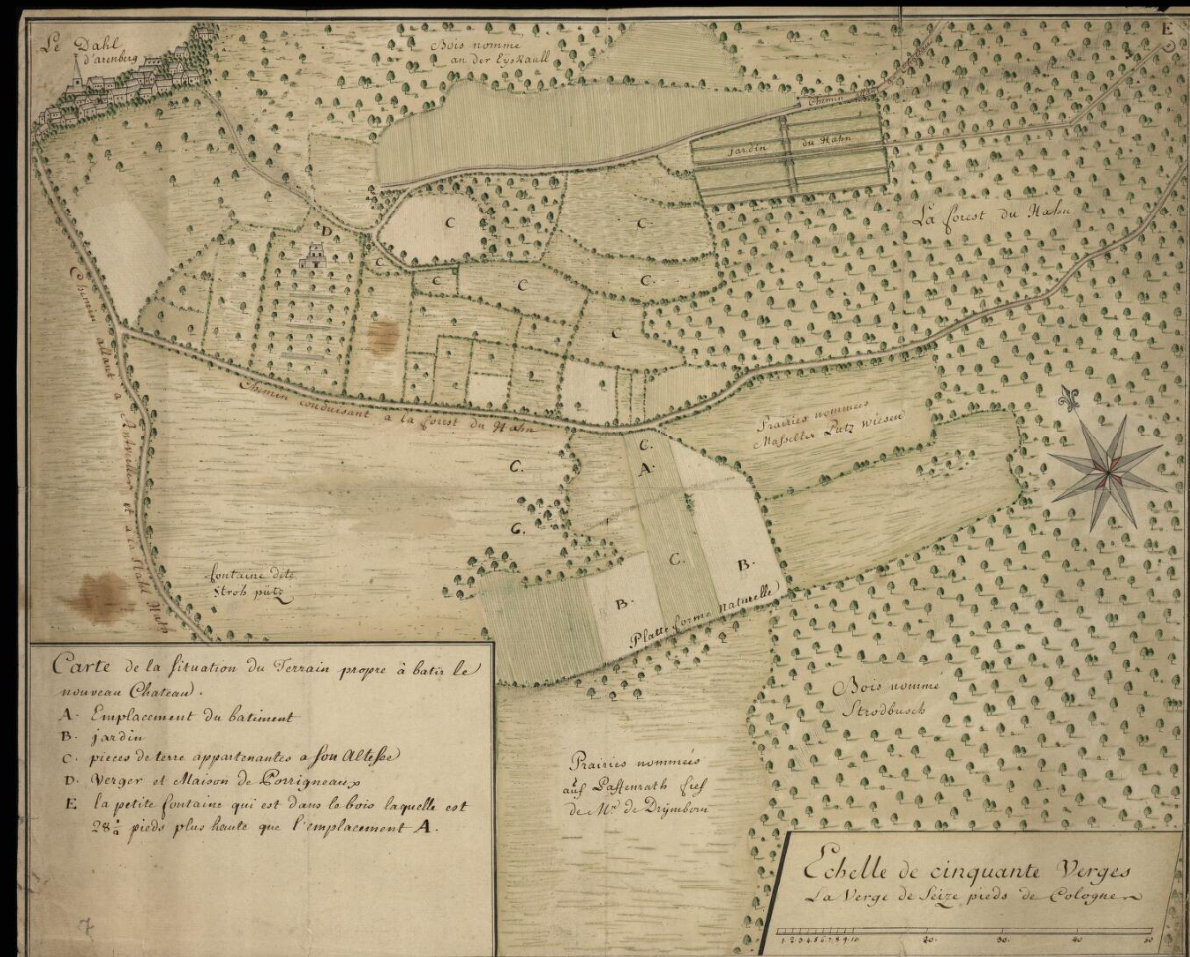
Around 1778, Louis Engelbert, 6th Duke of Arenberg wanted to construct a new neoclassical palace in the valley below Aremberg castle

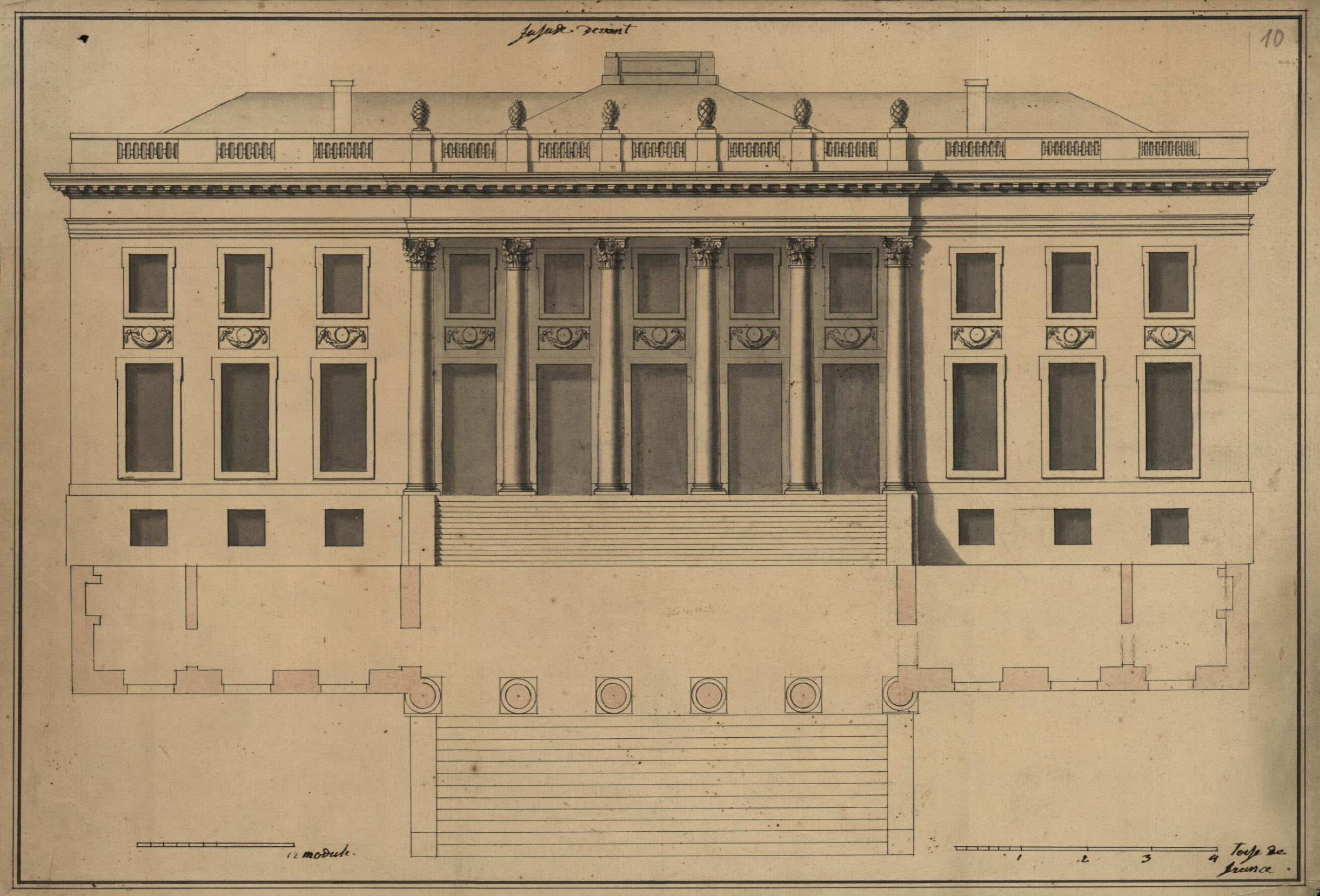
The facade design for the front of the new palace

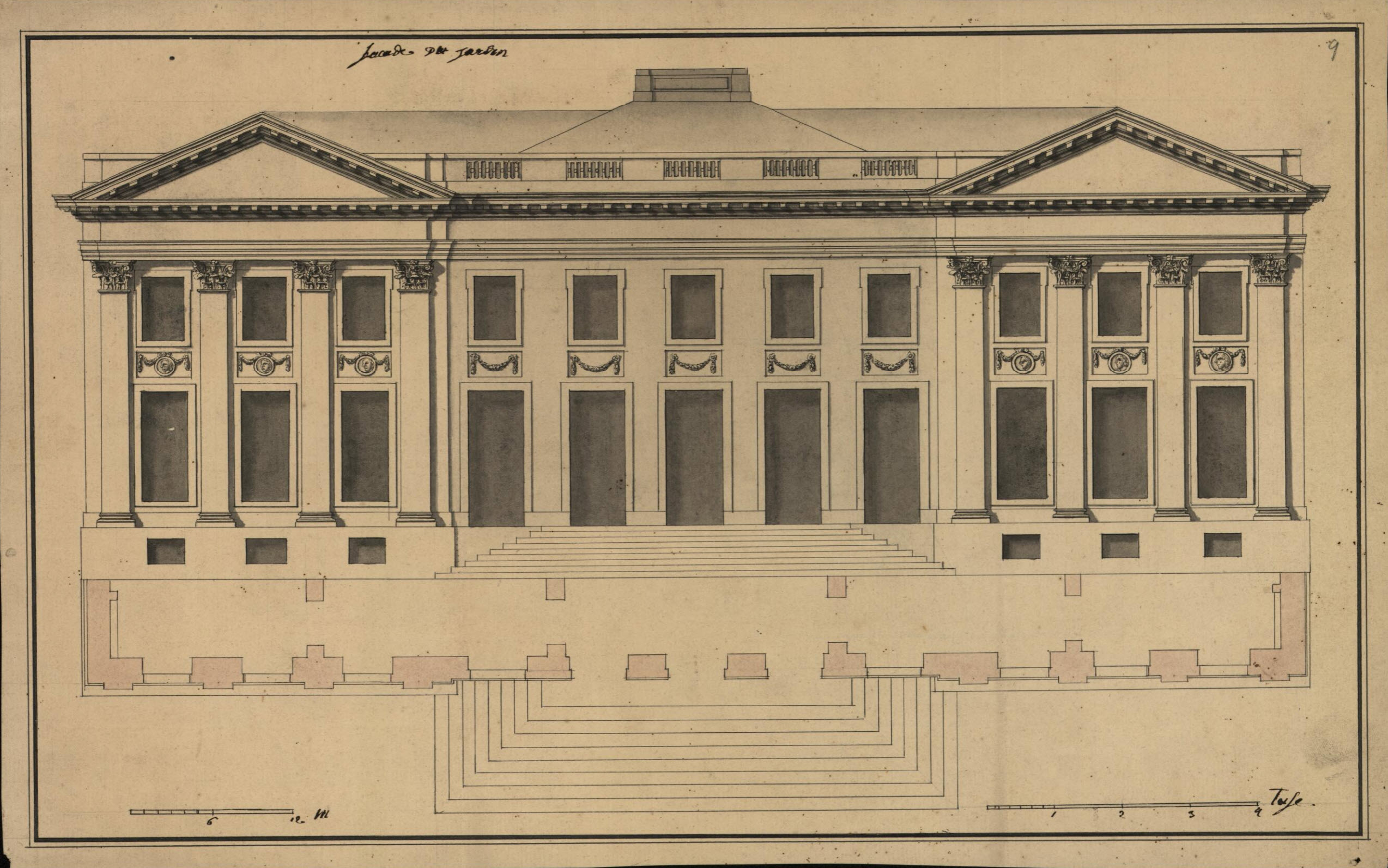
The facade design for the garden side of the new palace

== Viewing tower ==
A few years after the demolition, Gottfried Kinkel visited the field of ruins and this sight, together with the abject poverty of the Aremberg villagers filled him with anguish because the once flourishing settlement had become a poor village. He later reported this in his book Die Ahr (1846). In 1854, on the former castle grounds an approximately 17-metre-high viewing tower was built, which stands near a point on the mountain 623 m. It was built from the stone of the former castle complex. Due to the growth of trees, it has not been used as a lookout tower for decades. Likewise, the museum that used to be in it no longer exists. Today, the tower is locked.

== Literature ==
- Gerold Rosenthal (1987), Dechant Gerold Rosenthal im Auftrag der Kath. Kirchengemeinde St. Nikolaus Aremberg und der Gemeinde Aremberg (ed.), Aremberg in Geschichte und Gegenwart (in German), Aremberg: Gemeinde Aremberg
- Heinrich Neu (1938), Das Herzogtum Aremberg. Geschichte eines Territoriums der Eifel (in German), Euskirchen: Volksblatt-Verlag
- Peter Neu (1989), Die Arenberger und das Arenberger Land, Verlag der Landesarchivverwaltung Rheinland-Pfalz/Veröffentlichungen der LAV, Bände 52,67,68 (in German), Koblenz
