= Kopnück =

- Location within North Rhine-Westphalia

Highest point
- Elevation: 514.4 m above sea level (NHN) (1,688 ft)
- Coordinates: 50°30′00″N 06°48′00″E

Geography
- Location: near Kop Nück; Euskirchen, North Rhine-Westphalia, Germany
- Parent range: Eifel

Geology
- Mountain type: Hill

The Kopnück is a hill, 514.4 m above sea level (NHN), in the northern Ahr Hills, a region within the Eifel Mountains in Germany. It rises near the village of Kop Nück in the borough of Bad Münstereifel in the German state of North Rhine-Westphalia.
