= Houverath (Bad Münstereifel) =

- Stadtteil of Bad Münstereifel
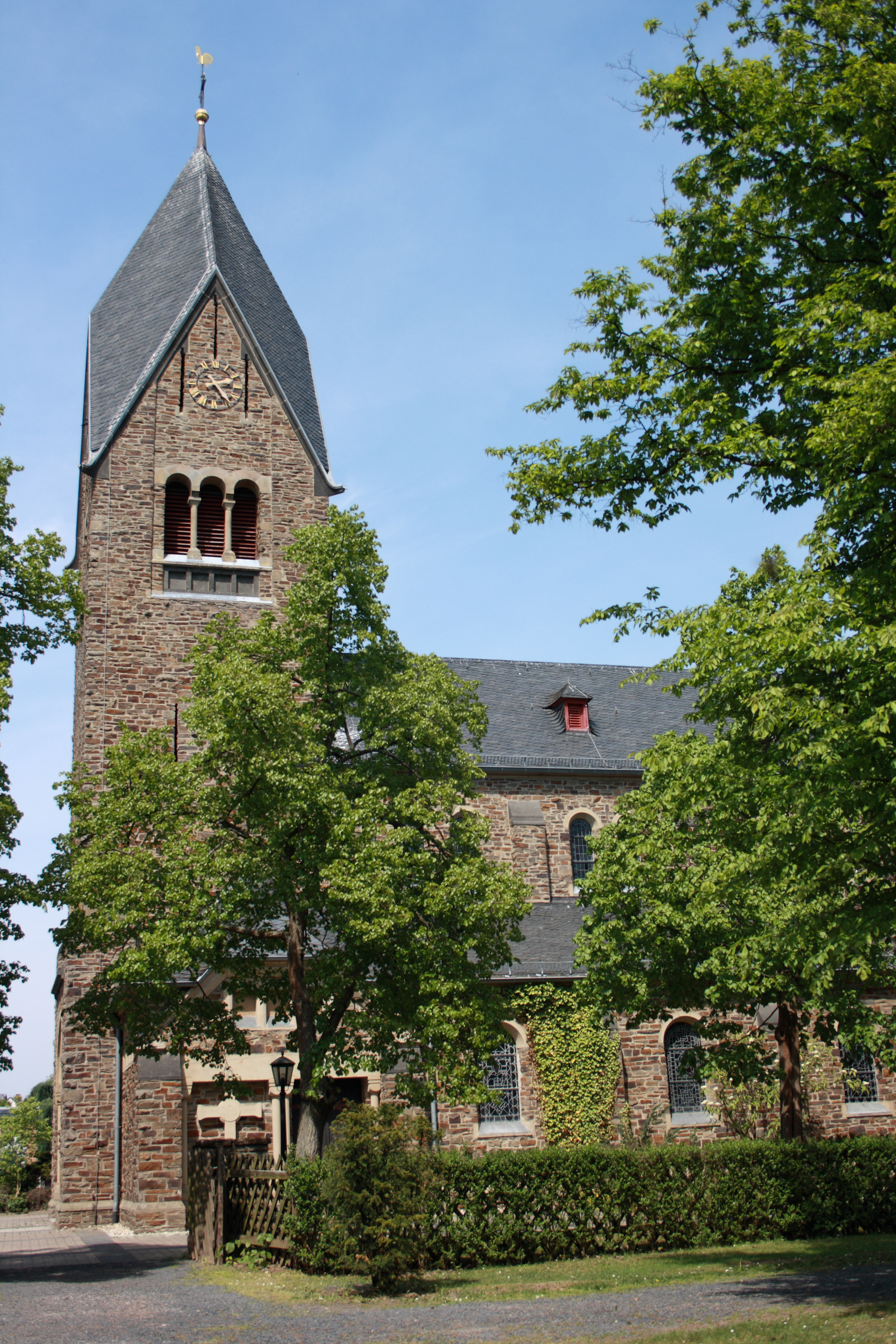
- Church of St Thomas
- Interactive map of Houverath
- Location within Germany Location within North Rhine-Westphalia
- Coordinates: 50°32′30″N 6°54′07″E
- Country: Germany
- State: North Rhine-Westphalia
- Municipality: Bad Münstereifel

Area
  - Total: 13.25 km^{2} (5.12 sq mi)
- Elevation: 354 m (1,161 ft)

Population (2020-12-31)
  - Total: 700
  - Density: 53/km^{2} (140/sq mi)
- Time zone: UTC+01:00 (CET)
  - Summer (DST): UTC+02:00 (CEST)
- Postal codes: 53902
- Dialling codes: 02257

Houverath is a village in the town of Bad Münstereifel in the district of Euskirchen, in the German state of North Rhine-Westphalia.

== Location ==
The village lies south of the town of Bad Münstereifel. The Landesstraße 497 runs through it. On the edge of the village is the stream of Houverather Bach, which merges with the Winkelbach and later, as the Sahrbach, empties into the River Ahr.

== History ==
Houverath is first recorded in 1190. At that time Houverath had already been in the possession of the counts of Vianden for 200 years. Territorial sovereignty changed, a good 200 years later, to the counts of Blankenheim. They had to step down in 1794 following the invasion of the French into the Rhineland.

At that time the villages of Limbach and Houverath formed a single juridical district. On 1 July 1969, the hitherto independent municipality of Houverath was incorporated into Bad Münstereifel.

== Transport ==
The Linientaxis ("line taxis") of routes 828 and 802 of the Cologne's RVK regional transport network run through the village.

== Facilities ==
There is a Catholic primary school and a two-group kindergarten, run by the town. Local clubs have a sports and multi-purpose hall. The parish church is dedicated to St. Thomas. There are 15 graves in the war cemetery.

One sight is the protected old St. Thomas Church which, until the consecration of the new one in 1913 was the parish church.

There is a carnival club with three guards. Below the village, on the stream of Houverather Bach, is the long-term campsite of the Cologne Camping Club.
