= Kop Nück =

- Village of Bad Münstereifel
- Interactive map of Kop Nück
- Location within Germany Location within North Rhine-Westphalia
- Coordinates: 50°30′02″N 6°48′03″E
- Country: Germany
- State: North Rhine-Westphalia
- Town: Bad Münstereifel
- Elevation: 457 m (1,499 ft)
- Time zone: UTC+01:00 (CET)
  - Summer (DST): UTC+02:00 (CEST)
- Postal codes: 53902
- Dialling codes: 02253

Kop Nück, also called Am Kopnück, is a small settlement, which belongs to the town of Bad Münstereifel in the district of Euskirchen in the German state of North Rhine-Westphalia.

== Location ==
Kop Nück lies 1.3 km south-southwest of Mahlberg and 2 km (both as the crow flies) southeast of Schönau, which are also part of Bad Münstereifel's borough. It is surrounded by the Schönau Forest (Schönauer Wald) and the hill of Kopnück (514.4 m) to the west. Roughly to the north of this hamlet, which lies at elevations of 440 to 460 m above sea level (NHN), runs the Landesstraße 165 in the valley of the Krumesbach from Esch, through Mahlberg to Schönau. To the south is the state border with Rhineland-Palatinate.
