= Hohe Acht =

Mountain in Germany

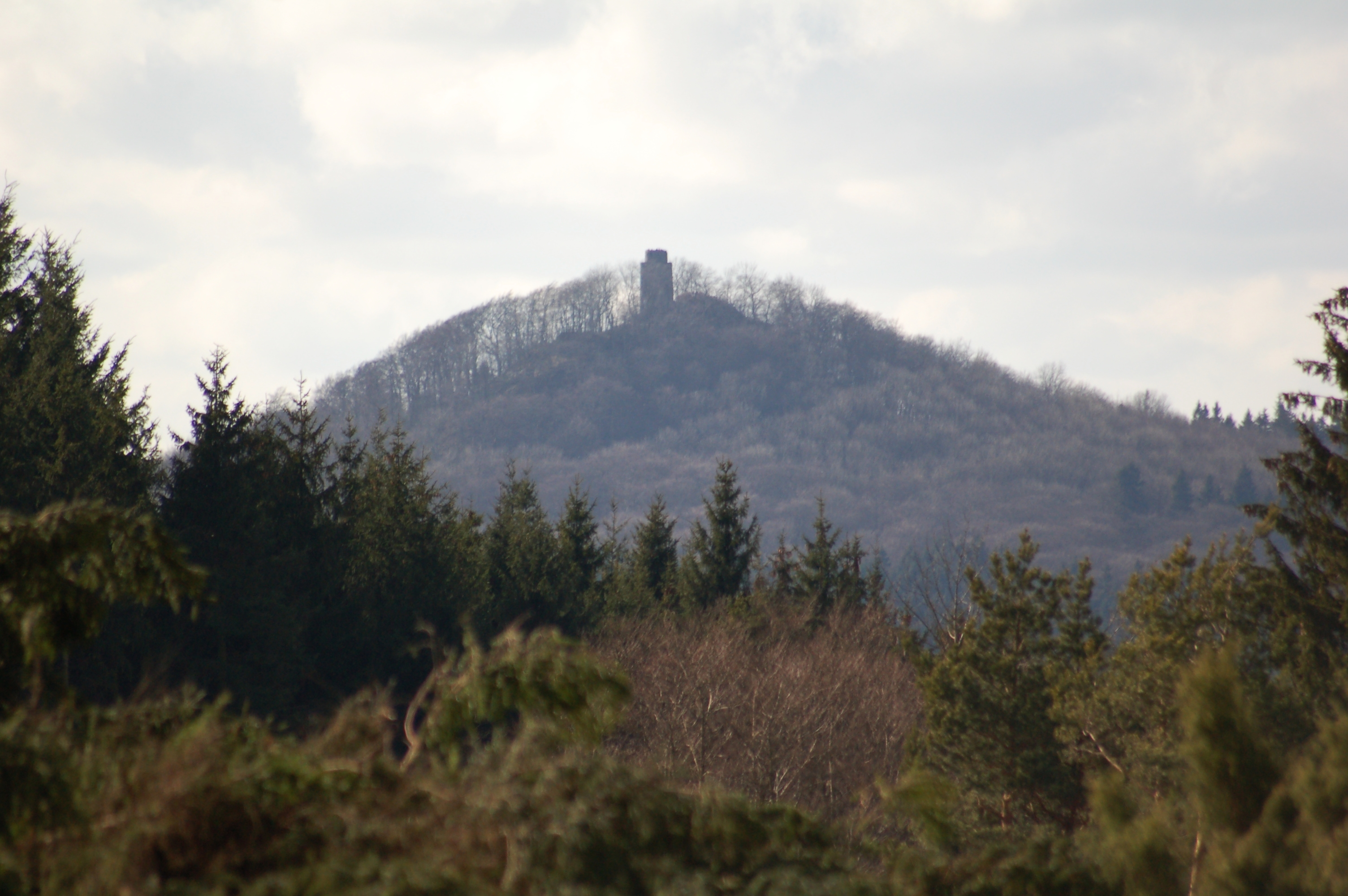
- The prominent peak of the Hohe Acht seen from the summit plateau of the Raßberg

Highest point
- Elevation: 746.9 m above sea level (NHN) (2,450 ft)
- Prominence: 525 m,WSW of Loison
- Isolation: 62.9 m,An den zwei Steinen (Hunsrück)
- Coordinates: 50°23′09″N 7°00′40″E

Geography
- Location within Rhineland-Palatinate
- Location: Rheinland-Pfalz, Germany
- Parent range: Eifel

The Hohe Acht (German: [ˌhoːə ˈʔaxt]) is the highest mountain (746.9 m above sea level (NHN)) in the Eifel mountains of Germany. It is located on the boundary between the districts of Ahrweiler and Mayen-Koblenz in Rhineland-Palatinate.

== Geography and geology ==
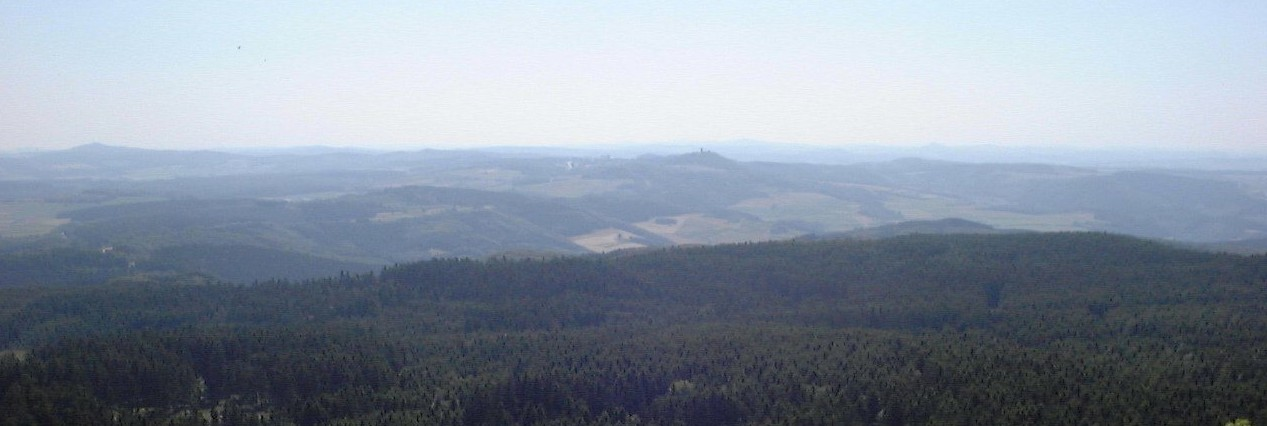
View from the Hohe Acht looking southwest towards Nürburg

The Hohe Acht is located in the High Eifel east of Adenau. The mountain is a Tertiary volcano, whose cone is composed of Lower Devonian rock and whose summit is made of basalt.

== Emperor William Tower ==
In 1908/09 the Emperor William Tower (Kaiser-Wilhelm-Turm) was erected on the Hohe Acht. The occasion for the construction of this stone observation tower, based on plans by the architect, Freiherr von Tettau of Berlin, was the silver wedding of Emperor William II and Empress Augusta Victoria as well as the commemoration of Emperor William I

The tower is 16.30 metres (53.5 ft) high and its walls are one metre thick at ground level. The work was carried out by master masons, Karl and Johannes Leidinger, from Adenau using local stone. The cost of construction was 18,000 marks. The tower has been a protected monument since 1987.

The Emperor William Tower offers a view across the whole Eifel (including the mountains of Scharteberg, Döhmberg, Michelsberg, Hochthürmerberg, Schöneberg, the nearby Nürburg Castle and Hochkelberg), as well as the Siebengebirge and its Großer Ölberg and, in conditions of good visibility, as far as the Westerwald, the Taunus, the Hunsrück and the Lower Rhine.

== Walking and winter sports ==
There is a network of footpaths around the Hohe Acht; at many places there are good views over the Eifel landscape.

In winter the Hohe Acht has good winter sport facilities including prepared cross country skiing trails, toboggan runs and ski lifts.

== Motor racing ==
Very close to the Hohe Acht on a 678 metres (2,224 ft) high volcanic cone is Nürburg Castle. A section of the North loop (Nordschleife) on the Formula 1 racetrack at the Nürburgring is known as the Hohe Acht.

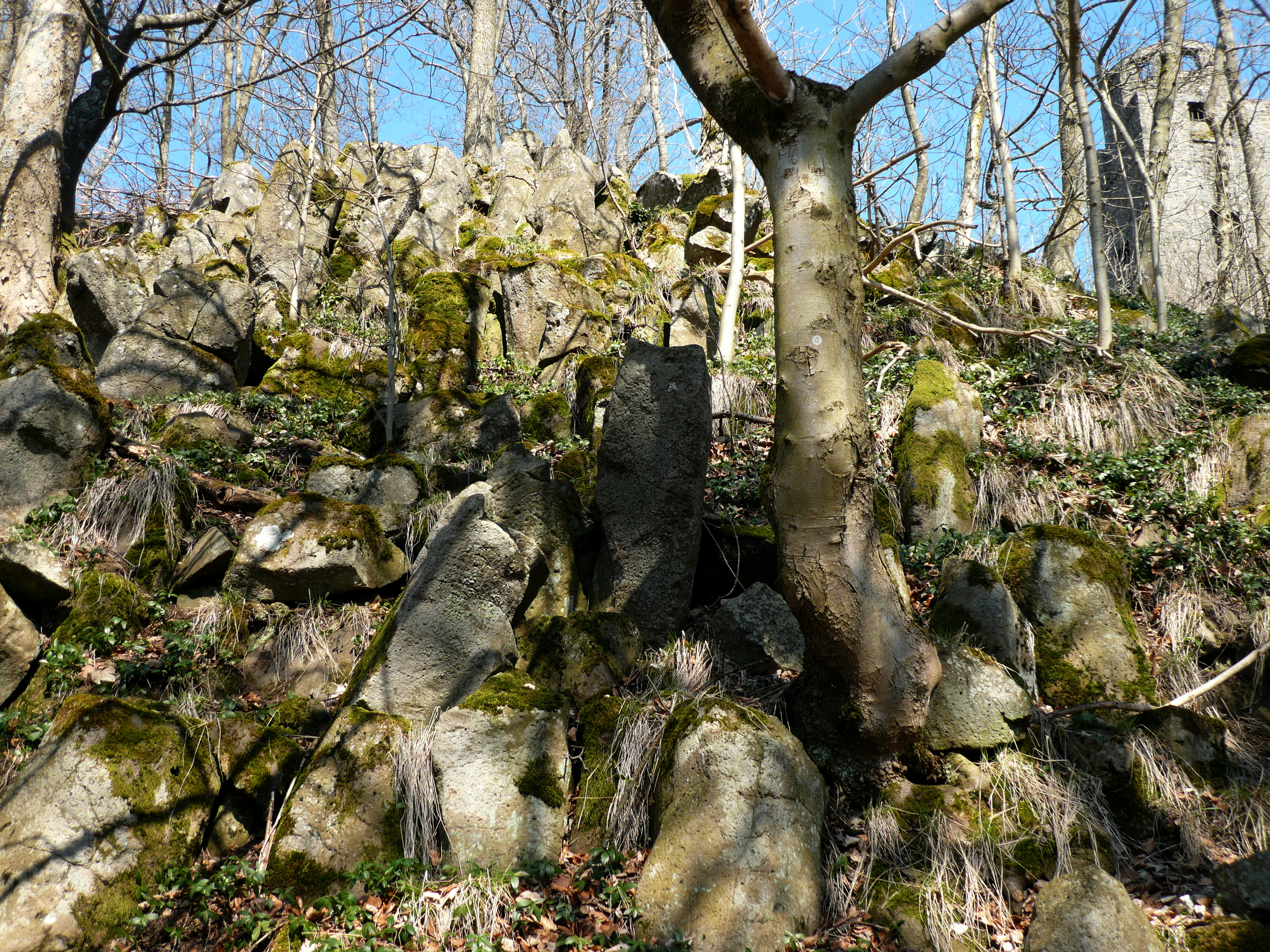
Basaltic blocks on the summit of the Hohe Acht

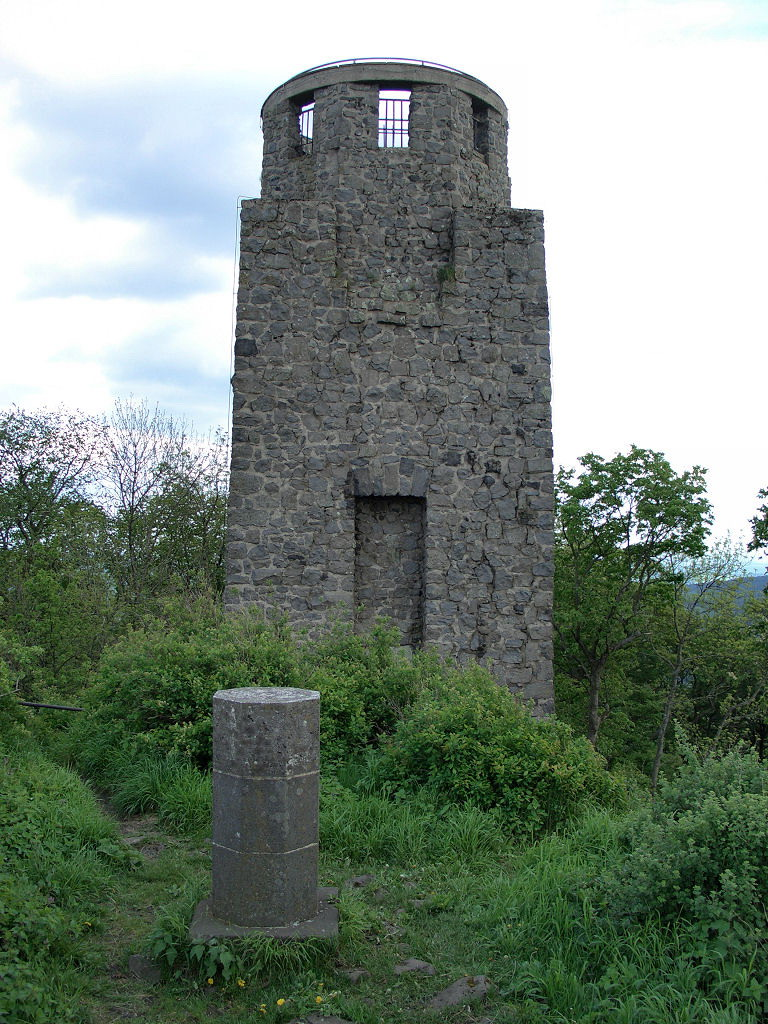
Summit rock on the Hohe Acht with the Kaiser Wilhelm Tower behind

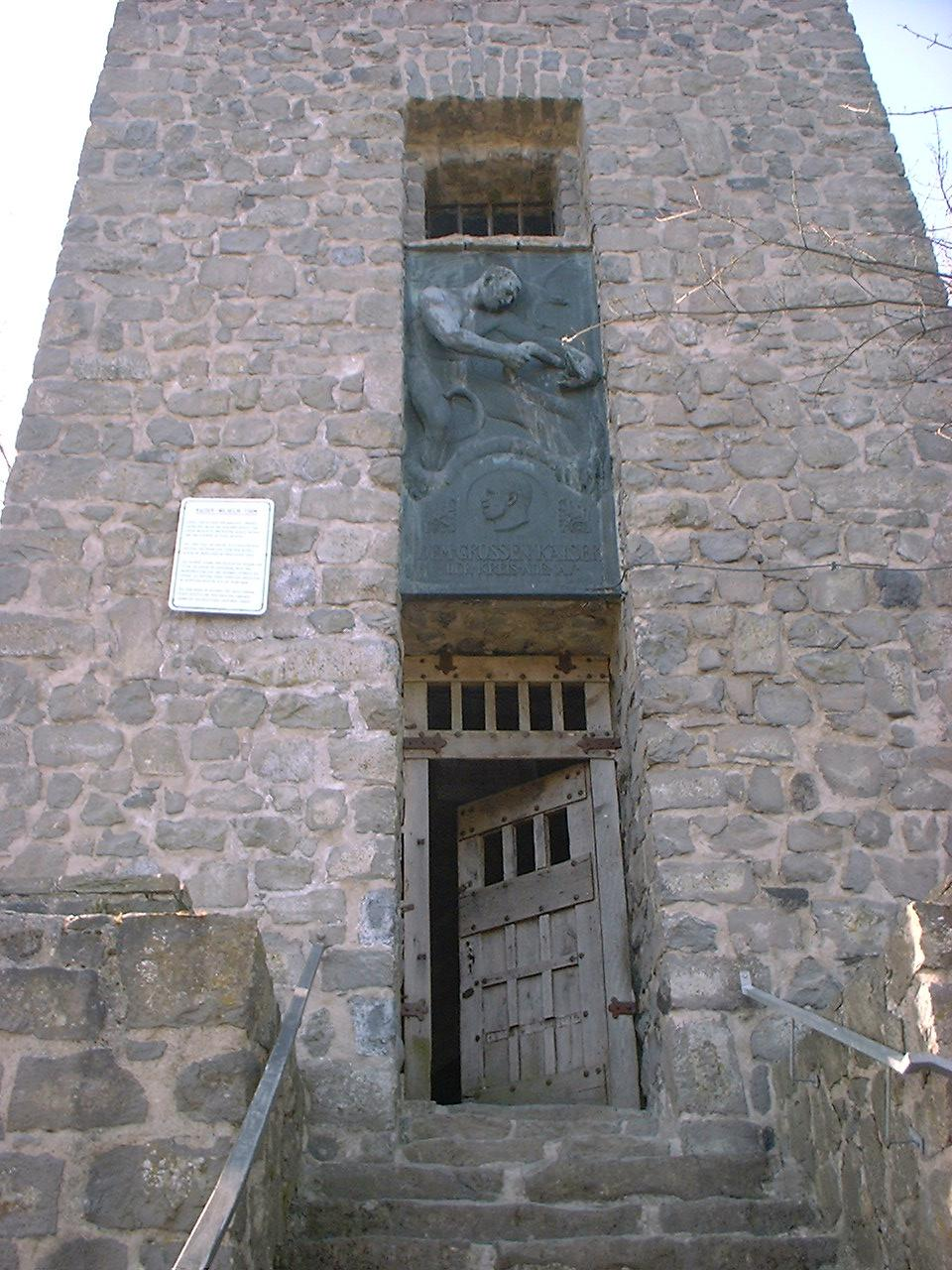
Kaiser Wilhelm Tower

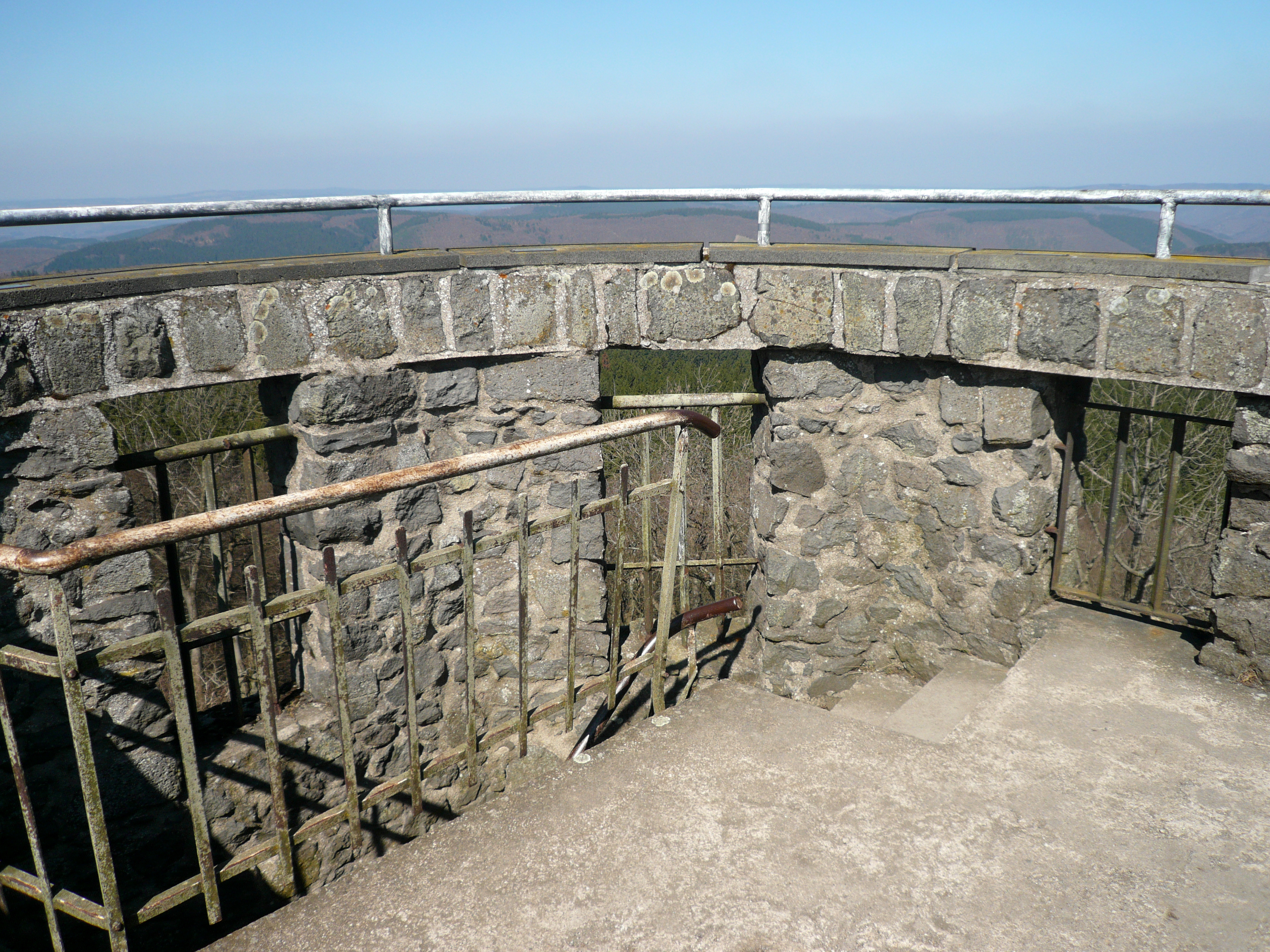
On the Kaiser Wilhelm Tower
