= Aremberg =

- Municipality
- Coat of arms

- Location of Aremberg within Ahrweiler district
- Interactive map of Aremberg
- Location within Germany Location within Rhineland-Palatinate
- Coordinates: 50°24′59″N 6°48′33″E
- Country: Germany
- State: Rhineland-Palatinate
- District: Ahrweiler
- Municipal assoc.: Adenau

Government
  - Mayor (2019–24): Alois Schneider

Area
  - Total: 9.62 km^{2} (3.71 sq mi)
- Elevation: 530 m (1,740 ft)

Population (2025-12-31)
  - Total: 207
  - Density: 21.5/km^{2} (55.7/sq mi)
- Time zone: UTC+01:00 (CET)
  - Summer (DST): UTC+02:00 (CEST)
- Postal codes: 53533
- Dialling codes: 02693
- Vehicle registration: AW

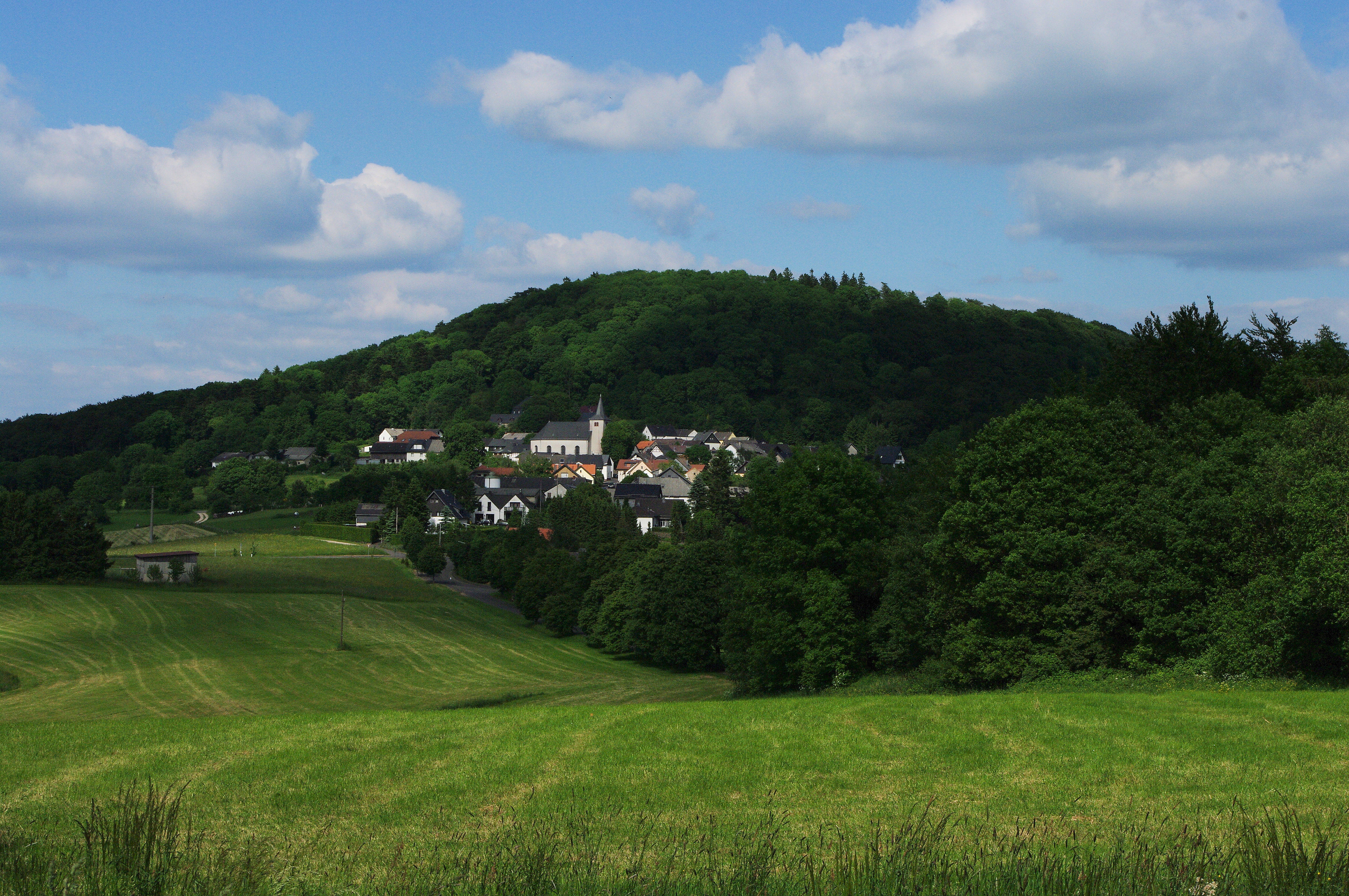
Aremberg

Aremberg (German pronunciation: [ˈaːʁəmbɛʁk]) is a municipality in the district of Ahrweiler, in Rhineland-Palatinate, Germany.

Nearby are the ruins of Aremberg Castle, once a mighty fortress of the House of Arenberg, on the summit of the Aremberg.
