= Jodl (disambiguation) =

- Alfred Jodl (1890–1946) was a German general during World War II

Jodl may also refer to:

- Ferdinand Jodl (1896–1956), a German general during World War II
- Friedrich Jodl (1849–1914), a German philosopher and psychologist
- Margarethe Jodl (1859–1937), German writer, co-founder of the Viennese Women's Club
- Stefanie Jodl (born 1998), a German singer

== See also ==
- Jodel
- Yodeling
