= Helene Scheu-Riesz =

Austrian activist and writer (1880–1970)

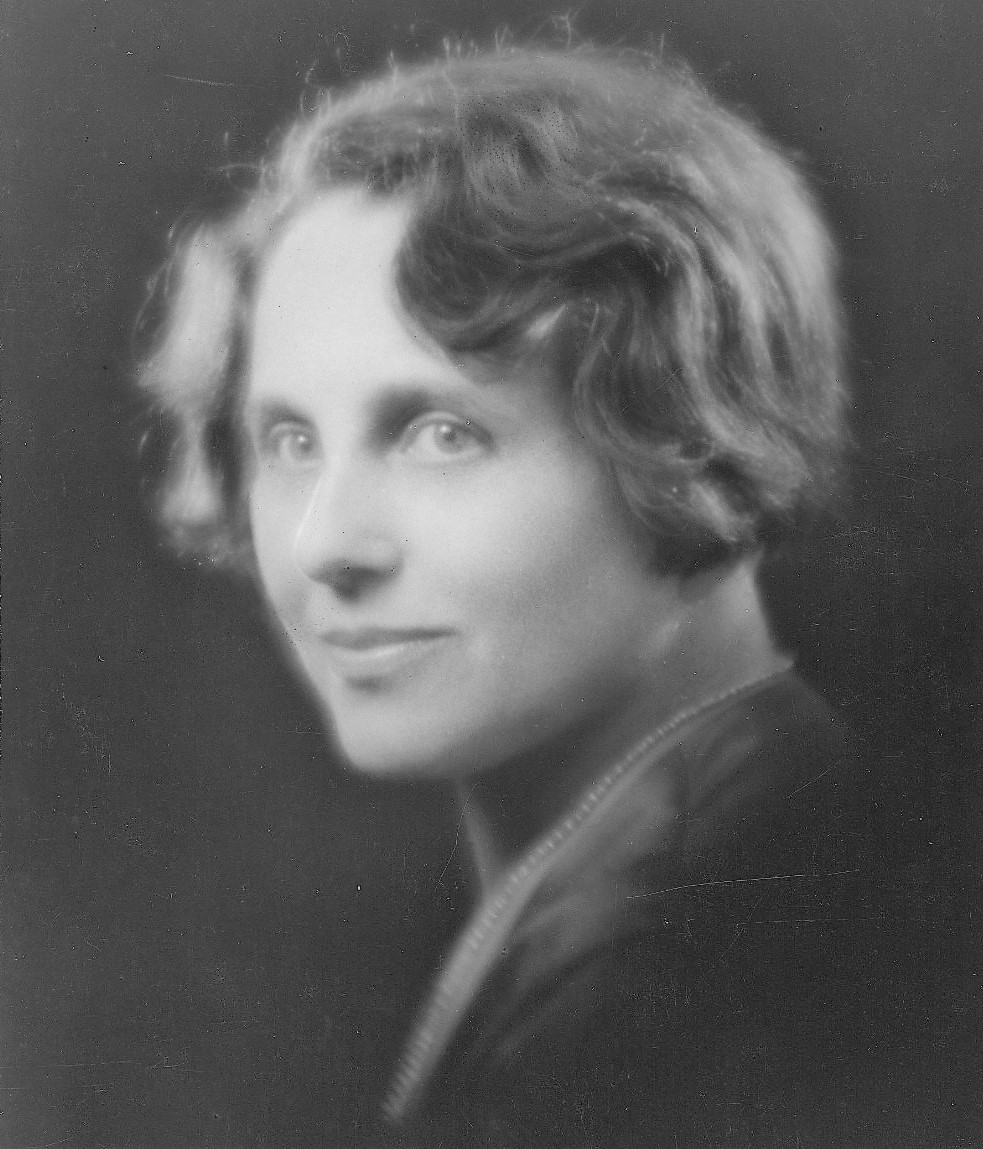
- Portrait by Georg Fayer, 1920s–1930s
- Born: Helene Riesz; 18 September 1880; Olomouc, Austria-Hungary
- Died: 8 January 1970 (aged 89); Vienna, Austria
- Occupations: Writer; publisher; peace and women's rights activist
- Years active: 1900–1954

Helene Scheu-Riesz (18 September 1880 – 8 January 1970) was an Austrian women's rights activist, pacifist, children's writer and publisher. In addition to supporting the Austrian women's movement, in November 1900 together with Yella Hertzka and three others she founded the Viennese Women's Club (Erster Wiener Frauenklub). She later became active in the Women's International League for Peace and Freedom, representing Austria at the organization's 1919 international congress in Zurich, the 1921 congress in Vienna and the 1924 congress in Washington, D.C. Scheu-Riesz took a special interest in children's literature, translating and writing books herself and founding the publishing house Sesam-Verlag in 1923. After the death of her husband, the Austrian intellectual and social democrat politician Gustav Scheu, as she was of Jewish heritage, in 1937 she moved to the United States. There she created the publishing house Island Press on the remote Ocracoke Island. She founded Open Sesame Inc. New York in 1949 to continue her philanthropic work of distributing world literature as a means of promoting internationalism and peace. In 1954, she returned to her house in the Hietzing district of Vienna where she spent the remainder of her life.

== Early life and family ==
Born on 18 September 1880 in Olomouc, Moravia, Austria-Hungary (now in the Czech Republic), Helene Riesz was the only child of Susanne (née Beer) and the Jewish wine merchant Adolf Riesz. During her infancy, the family settled in Klosterneuburg, just north of Vienna. She attended the Mädchengymnasium des Vereins für Erweiterte Frauenbildung, a private high school established to allow girls to take the matura examination which was required for university entrance. She took law courses at Vienna University but did not graduate. Around the age of eighteen, she traveled to England and studied literature. She became fascinated with penny booklets which published literature for children in an inexpensive format that was accessible to even the poorest families. She also became interested in the settlement movement, which focused on providing housing, employment assistance, language instruction, and medical care for urban poor and immigrant residents.

Returning to Austria, Riesz became active in the women's movement, publishing articles in support of women's rights and taking a special interest in opportunities for children. As early as 1900, together with Yella Hertzka, Margarethe Jodl, Marie Lang and Dora von Stockert-Meynert she founded the Viennese Women's Club (Erster Wiener Frauenklub). In 1904, she left the Jewish faith and married the lawyer Gustav Scheu (1875–1935) with whom she had two children: Friedrich (1905) and Elisabeth (1912). She joined the Religious Society of Friends, becoming one of Austria's first Quakers. Scheu-Riesz and her husband gained a central position in Viennese society thanks to their salon, to which they invited local and international celebrities, including the composers Alban Berg, Anton Webern and Arnold Schönberg, the painter Oskar Kokoschka, the actresses Elisabeth Neumann-Viertel and Helene Weigel, the architect Adolf Loos, who designed her house in Hietzing, and the educational innovator Eugenie Schwarzwald.

== Career ==
=== Activism ===
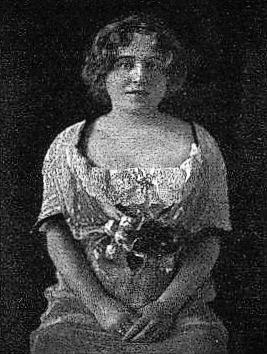
Scheu-Riesz, by Pauline Kruger Hamilton, 1914

Inspired by the cheap yet attractive booklets with short stories for children which had become popular in England, in 1905 Scheu-Riesz established a committee, along with Eugenie Hottmann and another activist, to organize the publication in German of similar little books for children at affordable prices in Austria. The beautifully illustrated collection focused on fairy tales and children's stories in German which cost far less than the poorly presented editions which were appearing in the shops for Christmas at horrendous prices. Most of the stories were rewritten by women with attractive new titles. Families were invited to purchase books for children, instead of or along with toys. Subscriptions were also available, allowing the committee to print large volumes of the stories for children's hospitals and humanitarian associations. Scheu-Riesz saw books as a means of creating better understanding between peoples and improving international relationships. Over the years, frequently traveling to England, she collected children's stories from various countries and assembled a collection of over 300 volumes, which also included French stories. Under the influence of her friend Eugenie Schwarzwald, Scheu-Riesz became active in educational reform. From the time of her teenage visit to London, she had tried to find a publisher interested in producing inexpensive, high-quality literature for children and young people. She was able to realize these plans in 1923 when she founded her own publishing house, Sesam-Verlag. The name was a play on the phrase "open sesame" from the tale "Ali Baba and the Forty Thieves" which magically opened the door (to knowledge), and its philanthropic mission took prevalence over earning a profit. At the time, the two leading children's publishers were Gerlachs Jugendbücherei (Gerlach's Youth Library) and Konegens Kinderbücher (Konegen's Children's Books) and she took over the market share of Konegen.

Scheu-Riesz campaigned for women's suffrage and worked in the international settlement movement. She wrote articles which appeared in the October 1913 issue of Zeitschrift für Frauen-Stimmrecht on both issues. She urged women to join the Austrian Voting Rights Committee to fight for their rights as citizens. After attending the 10th International Housing Congress in The Hague, she encouraged women to get involved in housing reforms. In the Netherlands, she reported she had met a woman housing inspector who focused on improving housing legislation and actively encouraged women and girls to participate in elevating the lives of apartment dwellers through social and artistic programs. Scheu-Riesz linked housing initiatives and education as meeting points for new ideas and after World War I, was involved in a government housing program which constructed homes for 50,000 people. She also pressed authorities to eliminate nationalist curricula from schools and focus on more practical learning. In addition to updating the materials used in schools, she wrote articles urging that teaching staff and teaching methods should be modernized and professionalized, moving away from the military model, which had been in use prior to the war.

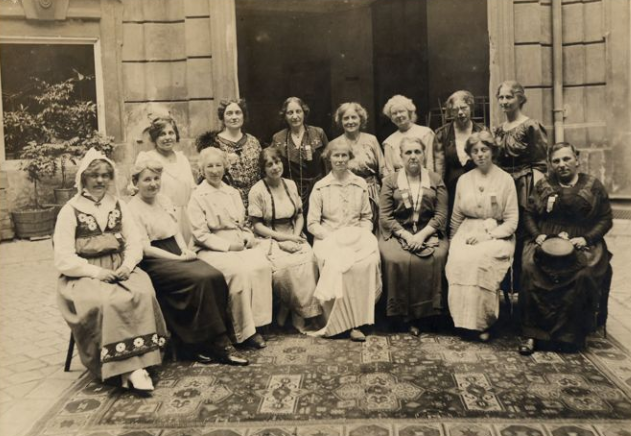
Group photo of delegates at the 1921 WILPF Vienna Congress. Scheu-Riesz, standing first left, back row

After writing several poems about peace, Scheu-Riesz was invited to attend the 1915 Women at the Hague congress, which resulted in the founding of the Committee of Women for Permanent Peace, subsequently known as the Women's International League for Peace and Freedom (WILPF). (Note: According to the official congress report, the delegates from Austria who registered to attend the 1915 Congress included Berta Frolich, Leopoldine Kulka, Helene Lecher, Rosa Mayreder, Olga Misař, Flora Weinwuem, and Francis Wolf-Cirian.) She represented Austria at the organization's 1919 international congress in Zurich, at the 1921 congress in Vienna, and the 1924 congress in Washington, D.C. Although not an official delegate, she also participated in the International Congress of Women, held in Vienna in July 1921. In 1931, Scheu-Riesz became a vice-president of the Austrian chapter of the WILPF. After moving to the United States, she continued to work with WILPF, through the North Carolina branch, giving lectures to women's groups.

=== Writing ===
Scheu-Riesz began working as a journalist at an early age. In 1910, she became editor at Konegens Kinderbücher (Konegens Children's Books). While there, she implemented a series of world literature books for children. Initially the publications were made twice a year, but for the duration of World War I publication was sporadic. Among her many translations were poems by Elizabeth Barrett Browning and numerous children's stories and fairy tales from China, Estonia, Great Britain, Japan, Spain, Sweden, and the United States, among other places. Included in her over 200 works for children were "Japanische Volksmärchen" ("Japanese Folk Tales", 1912), "Die Abenteuer des Odysseus" ("The Adventures of Odysseus", 1919), "Nordische Sagen" ("Nordic Sagas", 1920), "Der Teufel und sein Lehrjunge und andere serbische Volksmärchen" ("The Devil and His Apprentice Boy and other Serbian Folk Tales", 1922), "Bulgarische Volksmärchen" ("Bulgarian Folk Tales", 1922), and "Chinesische Volksmärchen" ("Chinese Folk Tales", 1923), as well as translations of Alice in Wonderland, The Canterbury Tales, Don Quixote, Gulliver's Travels, and Pilgrim's Progress. She translated several contemporary English plays in the 1920s, such as "At Mrs. Beam's" and "The Battle of Tindersley Down" into German. Her first novel in English, Gretchen Discovers America (1934) was a romance about a German girl who came to the United States and found love in the interwar period.

Among her influential translations was her version of Alice's Adventures in Wonderland by Lewis Carroll. Published in 1912, it was the second translation of the book into German and remained the dominant translation into the 1960s. Despite a large number of reprints of her version, the genre of deliberate literary nonsense was virtually unknown in Germany and faced criticism as to whether it was appropriate for children. In an effort to make the book more palatable for German readers, until the 1960s, translations attempted to make the book more akin to the more familiary genre of fairy tales. In 1923, she produced the first translation of the sequel, Through the Looking-Glass. Her version attempted a faithful rendering of the text, however, the nonsensical text proved difficult to translate, as words such as "brillig", "chortle", and "slithy" were invented by Carroll. Her translation, Alice im Spiegelland, was republished by Ulan Press in 2012, and also in 2017 by Verlagshaus Jacoby & Stuart.

== Relocation to the United States ==
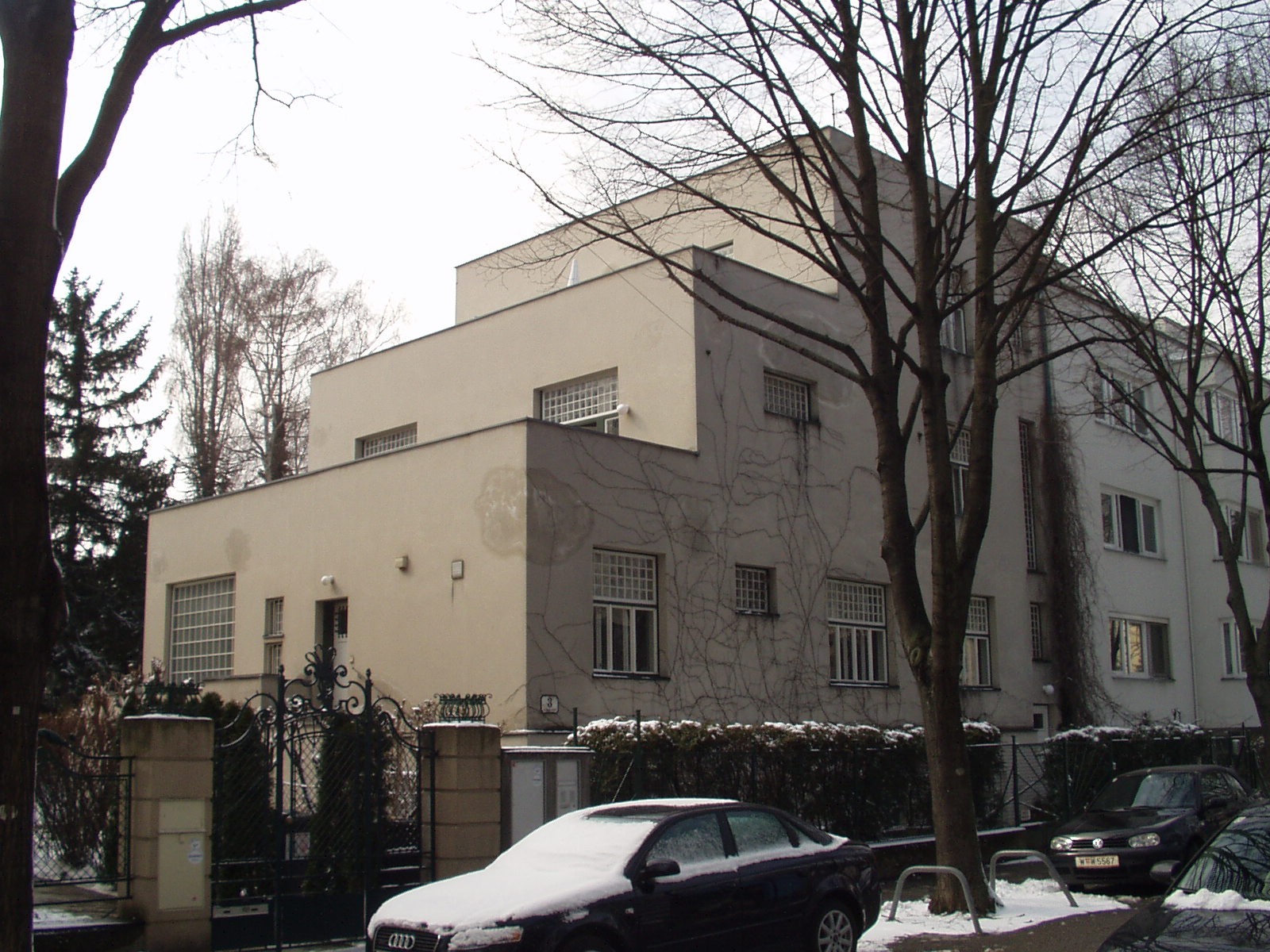
Scheu-Riesz's home in Vienna, designed by Adolf Loos

Scheu-Riesz's husband Gustav, who had become a social democratic politician, died in 1935. As a widow, despite becoming a member of the Protestant church, she was concerned that her Jewish heritage would present problems with the Nazis who were gaining popularity in Austria. She made a trip to England and the United States in 1936 to organize her emigration. In 1937, she decided to move to the United States where her daughter had already settled. She became a well-known figure in the artists community on Ocracoke Island off the Atlantic coast of North Carolina. There she created the Island Press, a publishing house which operated from 1941 to 1954. She also hosted classes and workshops for artists and writers interested in learning creative writing and radio scriptwriting. She also took graduate courses at the University of North Carolina and continued to publish books. Among her publications in the US were Will You Marry Me? (1940), a collection of proposal letters from historical figures, and Those Funny Grownups (1943), a satirical examination of adult behavior from a child's perspective.

In 1949, Scheu-Riesz founded Open Sesame Inc. New York, as a vehicle to provide funds for United World Books. In order to establish the firm, which intended to reproduce classic literature at low cost and distribute those volumes through United World Books, she solicited contributions from contemporary authors and sold high-priced, limited editions of their autographed and illustrated works. United World Books was able to begin distributing books the following year. The first books printed in the United States were intended to be distributed to students in Austria to help them learn English and develop pen-pal relations with American students. By 1953, she was working with the United Nations Educational, Scientific and Cultural Organization and the Indian government to develop materials for adult education courses, also hoping to include books for children. Unlike many who emigrated during the war, she enjoyed life in America.

== Later life, death, and legacy ==
In 1954, Scheu-Riesz returned to Vienna where she retrieved the house in Hietzing specially designed by her friend Adolf Loos. She remained active in the publishing business while also providing support for young people interested in drama or music. Scheu-Riesz died in Vienna on 8 January 1970. She was buried next to her husband in the Vienna Central Cemetery. She has been remembered for her writing and her goals of spreading internationalism and world peace by publishing cultural works. In 2008, her book Will You Marry Me? was reissued by Touchstone Books. Reviewers noted that the book gave insight into marriage proposals in different periods of society and the way that language has been used to either charm a beloved, or make a business arrangement.
