= Yella Hertzka =

Austrian women's rights and peace activist (1873–1948)

- Born: Yella Fuchs; 4 February 1873; Vienna, Austria-Hungary
- Died: 13 November 1948 (aged 75); Vienna, Austria
- Other names: Jella Herzka; Yella Hertzky; Yella Hertzka-Taussig
- Occupations: Horticulturist; school director; activist; music publisher
- Years active: 1900–1948

Yella Hertzka (née Fuchs; 4 February 1873 – 13 November 1948) was an Austrian women's rights and peace activist, school director, and music business executive. She began working in women's humanitarian and social improvement projects in 1900. Co-founding the Neuer Wiener Frauenklub (New Vienna Women's Club) in 1903, she served as its president from 1909 to 1933. From 1904 she participated in the international women's rights movements, supporting women's suffrage and pacifism. In 1919, she attended the Zürich congress of the Women's International League for Peace and Freedom (WILPF). She was a co-founder of the Austrian section of the WILPF, organized its 1921 Vienna Congress, and attended every international WILPF congress held between 1919 and 1948. She worked to free prisoners of war after World War I and during World War II helped those wanting to emigrate or oppose the draft.

In 1903, Hertzka co-founded Cottage Girls' Lyceum with Salka Goldman to facilitate women's qualifying for university entrance or professional training. After completing training in English and advanced horticulture abroad, she returned home in 1909 and established the Villenkolonie Kaasgraben (Kaasgraben Villa Colony), an innovative housing project for intellectuals and artists. In 1913, she co-founded the first school in Austria-Hungary to train women in horticulture and landscape architecture. She directed the school and simultaneously, after 1932 when her husband died, managed the music publishing company Universal Edition until 1938. During her tenure at Universal Edition, she strove to develop new talent, focused in particular on assisting woman musicians and composers.

When the Nazi regime annexed Austria, all of the organizations and businesses Hertzka had been involved in were banned or Aryanized. To facilitate her ability to travel, she married her cousin Edgar Taussig, gaining his Czechoslovak nationality in December 1938. Emigrating to London for the duration of the war, she worked as a landscape architect and gardener, continuing her pacifist activism. Taussig was murdered in 1943 in a concentration camp. When the war ended, Hertzka chose not to renew her Czech nationality, applied for restoration of her Austrian nationality, and returned to Austria in 1946. She immediately began to re-establish the Austrian chapter of the WILPF and recover her businesses and property. She was appointed administrator for Universal Edition, receiving full control of the business in 1947 despite fighting legal issues with the building owner until her death. Neither her personal property nor her nationality was restored before she died in 1948. The City Council of Vienna established a park in the Seestadt Aspern neighborhood in her honor in 2012.

== Early life and education ==
Yella Fuchs was born on 4 February 1873 in Vienna, Austria Hungary, to Agnes (née Tedesco) and Ferdinand Fuchs. The youngest of seven siblings, she grew up in a liberal, upper-class Jewish family. Her father was a businessman, and Agnes, his second wife, was the mother of five of their children. On 20 May 1897, at the Stadttempel in Vienna, she married Emil Hertzka, who was a music publisher and originally from Budapest. While he was building his career, from around 1900 Hertzka was involved in women's humanitarian and social improvement projects in Austria, becoming a member of the Frauenvereinigung für soziale Hilfstätigkeit (Women's Association for Social Welfare). She also co-founded and joined the Wiener Frauenklub (Vienna Women's Club, 1900–1902), and participated in the Wiener Kleidersammelstelle (Viennese Clothing Collection Point), an initiative which allowed the poor to acquire clean, used clothing. On a visit to England in 1903, she took a course in English at Oxford University, offered to foreign women.

== Women's rights (1903–1938) ==
=== Suffrage and civil rights ===
In 1903, Hertzka became one of the twelve co-founders of the Neuer Wiener Frauenklub (New Vienna Women's Club), which was originally founded as an apolitical salon and literary association for women. Initially the president was Helene Forsmann, succeeded by Dora von Stockert-Meynert. Hertzka became involved in the international women's rights movements in 1904 and attended the Berlin Congress of the International Council of Women, where she established friendships with several prominent feminists, including Käthe Schirmacher and Helene Stöcker. From 1905, the club focused on attaining women's suffrage and campaigned against laws prohibiting women from political participation. Hertzka became president of the Neuer Wiener Frauenklub in 1909 and remained in the position until 1933. She participated in the Vienna Voting Rights Conference of 1913 and led the Commission for Horticulture and Small Animal Breeding of the Federation of Austrian Women's Associations, until the commission dissolved in 1918. A committed pacifist, when war was declared in 1914, Hertzka and the Neuer Wiener Frauenklub formally opposed the conflict. The club sent a delegate, Francis Wolf Girian, to the Hague Congress held in 1915.

=== Pacifism ===
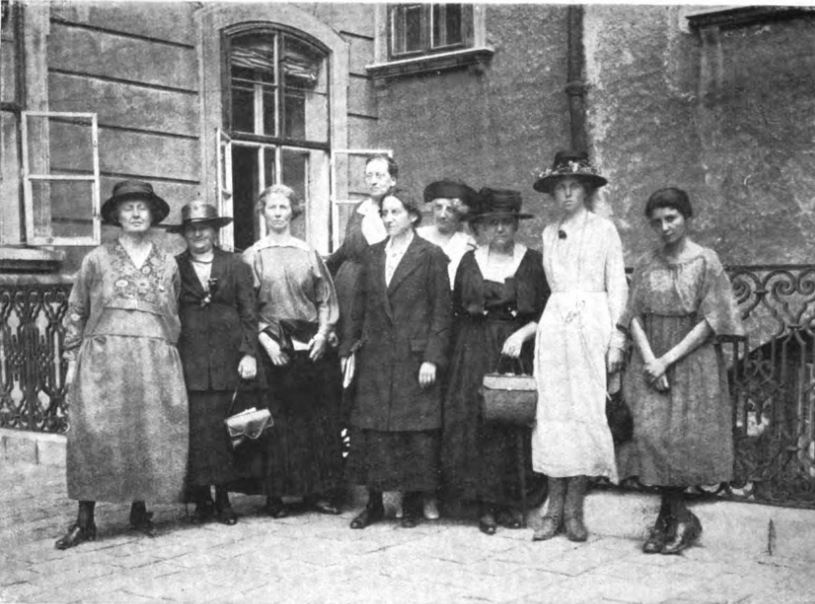
1921 WILPF Executive Committee: Left to right, front: Cornelia Ramondt-Hirschmann, Gabrielle Duchêne, Lida Gustava Heymann, Hertzka, Jane Addams, Catherine Marshall, Gertrud Baer. Back: Emily Greene Balch and Thora Daugaard.

Because the International Women Suffrage Alliance conference to be held in Berlin had been cancelled, a committee of Dutch women, led by Aletta Jacobs, proposed that the Netherlands, as a neutral country, could host a meeting to allow women to maintain their solidarity. From this congress, the International Committee of Women for Permanent Peace, which would become the Women's International League for Peace and Freedom (WILPF), was formed. The Austrian members of the committee, Leopoldine Kulka and Olga Misař, were chosen. When the war ended, Hertzka attended the 1919 WILPF convention in Zürich, along with Kulka and Elsa Beer-Angerer. There, she persuaded the WILPF members to hold the next biennial convention in Vienna. Returning home, she and Kulka founded the Austrian WILPF chapter in 1920. The following year when Kulka died, Hertzka became president of the Austrian section of the WILPF. She was the primary coordinator and organizer for the third WILPF congress in Vienna, working with Emily Greene Balch, international organization's Secretary-Treasurer. Shortly after the event, the Austrian WILPF branch split along ideological grounds. Those who felt nationalist goals were more important than international objectives and absolute pacifism left the organization.

Hertzka attended all of the WILPF congresses held between 1919 and 1946, participating as a group leader, organizer, or speaker. In 1919, she traveled to Scandinavia, lecturing in Norway and Sweden about the WILPF and seeking support for prisoners of war held in Siberia and Turkestan. From there she traveled on to London, Paris, and Switzerland. Continuing this mission, she went to the United States the following year and successfully secured American help in negotiating the return of war prisoners from Siberia, as well as financial concessions enabling Austria to secure a loan from the League of Nations. She became a member of the international WILPF's executive board in 1921. In 1924, she became chair of the East European Commission for WILPF, and two years later was appointed to serve on the International Advisory Council of the National Woman's Party. In the 1930s, she chaired the Economic Commission of the WILPF, interacting with members of the International Labour Organization. In Austria, Hertzka's public appearances and activities were increasingly limited as a result of rising antisemitism. In March 1938, all Jewish members of the Neuer Wiener Frauenklub were expelled. In November the club was dissolved when Germany annexed Austria and implemented policies to ban women's organizations involving political activities. The same year, Hertzka ended her service as president of the Austrian chapter of the WILPF, when the organization was banned by the Nazi regime.

== Schools and artist colony (1903–1938) ==
=== Lyceum and artist colony ===
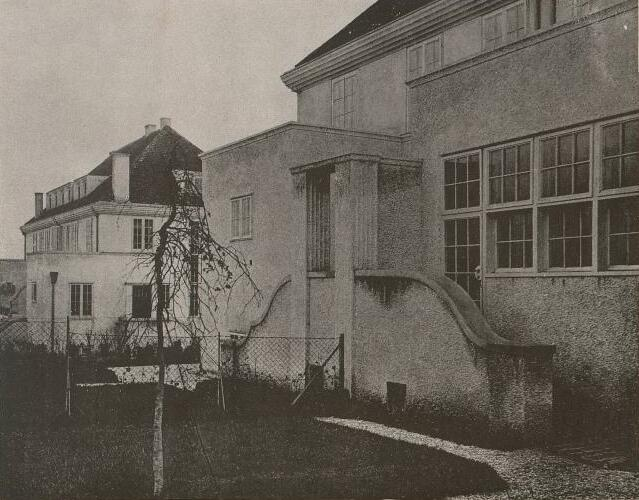
Two of the duplex homes in the Villenkolonie im Kaasgraben, 1917

Hertzka and Salka Goldman co-founded the Cottage Girls' Lyceum in the Cottage Quarter of Döbling, in 1903. The school moved several times in the early years of its operation. In 1904, it was located on Prinz Eugen Straße and moved again in 1905 to Gymnasium Straße. Donating the buildings for the school, Hertzka also did various administrative tasks. The school was designed to give girls the opportunity to attain secondary schooling and gain professional training. In the early years of its operation, however, completing the courses and passing the final examination only allowed graduates to participate in the Philosophical Faculty of the University of Vienna as extraordinary students. During the 1913–1914 term, Goldman adopted the advanced courses required for the reform-realgymnasium examination, which qualified graduates for standard university admission. Around this time, as their pro-German nationalist leanings surfaced, Hertzka distanced herself from both Goldman and Schirmacher, with whom she had maintained a correspondence for over a decade.

In 1908 and 1909, Hertzka attended the Rheinische Obst- und Gartenbauschule für Frauen (Rhineland Fruit and Horticultural School for Women) in Bad Godesberg near Bonn, Germany, and completed advanced training in horticulture. She returned to Austria determined to establish a Höhere Gartenbauschule für Frauen (Higher Horticultural School for Women), but it would be several years before she did so. Hertzka often hosted garden parties, attended by many internationally known composers such as Béla Bartók, Zoltán Kodály, Ernst Krenek, Gustav Mahler, Darius Milhaud, and Arnold Schoenberg. To foster their work, she called on Josef Hoffmann to design an artists' colony in Kaasgraben, near her home in Grinzing. She helped Hoffmann plan the colony and financed the undertaking. The colony had four duplex units, a relatively recent housing innovation in Vienna at the time. Completed in 1912, the Villenkolonie Kaasgraben (Kaasgraben Villa Colony) attracted many artists and intellectuals as residents, including the secretary general of the Vienna Concert Hall, Hugo Botstiber; economist Adolf Drucker; composer Egon Wellesz and his wife, art historian Emmy; and Hans Vetter, an architect and co-founder of the Austrian Work Association.

=== Higher Horticultural School for Women ===
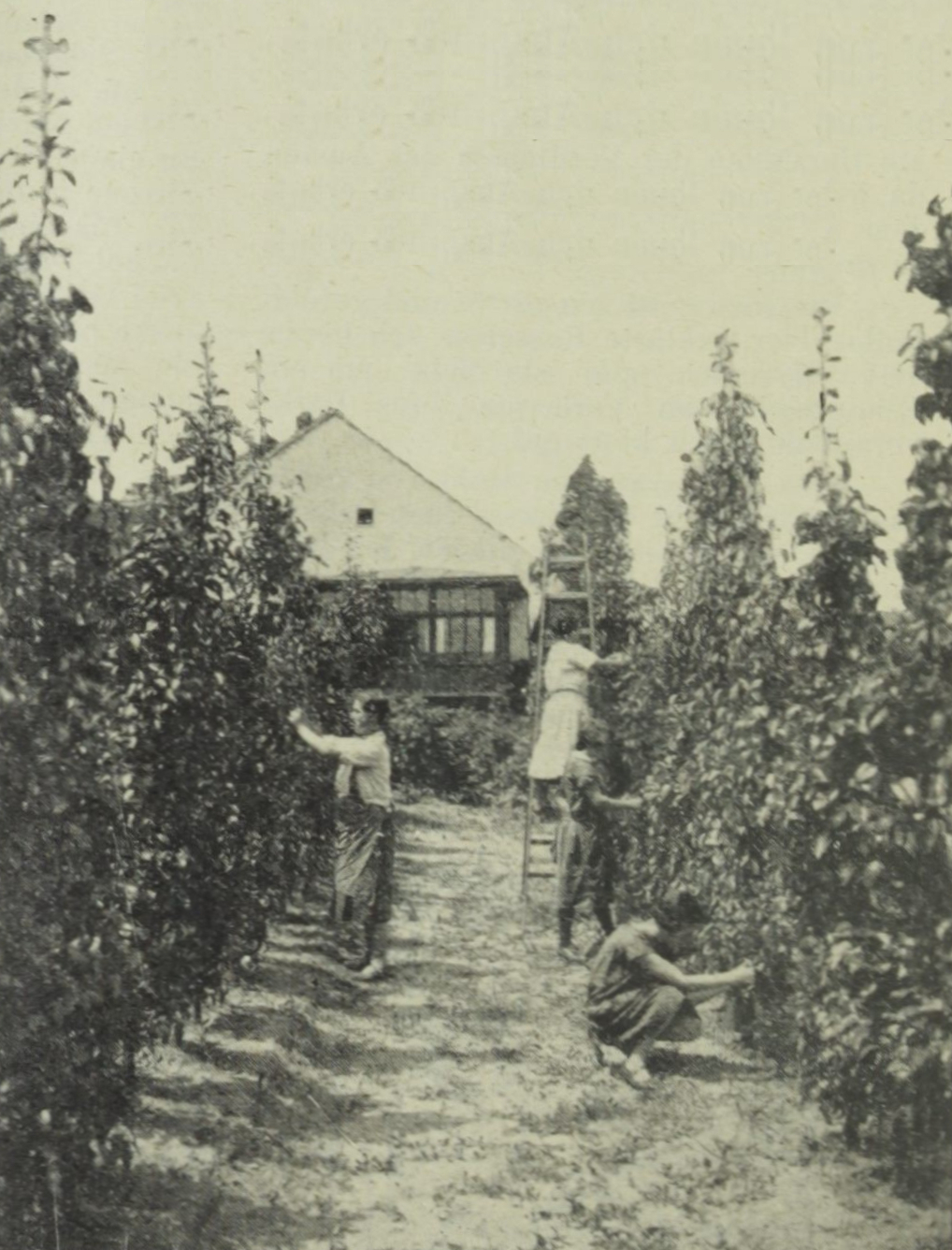
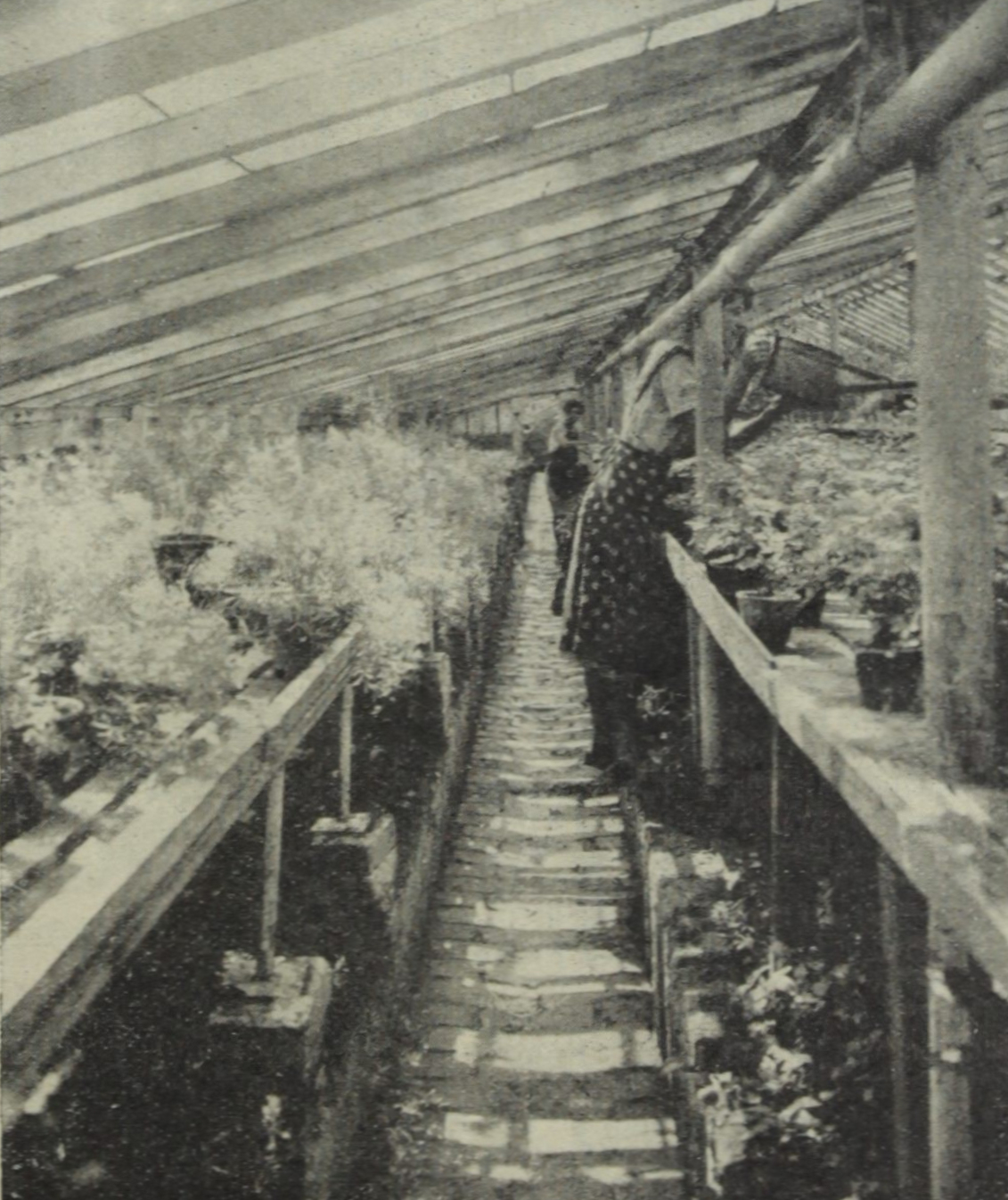
Students working in Hertzka's gardening school in 1926

In 1913, Hertzka founded the first secondary horticultural school for girls in Austria-Hungary, also located in Kaasgraben, part of Grinzing in the Döbling district. She served as director of the school until 1938. The school offered training in horticulture and landscape architecture, opening the fields to women/ It also gave general business and law courses, requiring students to grow and market their produce. Besides practical work in the garden and greenhouse, students attended lectures on botany, drawing, geology, landscaping, growing flowers and vegetables, and soil science. The program was accredited by the Austrian Ministry of Agriculture and diplomas were issued to students who successfully completed an examination. When war broke out the year after her school had opened, Hertzka offered the gardens of the school to other secondary schools and helped train them to operate community gardens throughout Vienna to combat food shortages and malnutrition for the duration of the conflict. The school offered the rare opportunity for women to achieve economic independence with training in horticulture and gardening or landscape architecture in Austria-Hungary in the early decades of the twentieth century. Until 1921, it was closely affiliated with an adjacent home economics school run by Marie Wettstein, a colleague in the WILPF before the organizational dispute.

In 1920, the alumni of the Higher Horticultural School for Women founded the networking organization Verein der Grinzinger Gärtnerinnen (Association of Grinzing Women Gardeners) to help each other secure employment, share professional and training information, and promote women gardeners. From 1926, the alumni association was open to woman gardeners throughout Austria, regardless of where they had trained. Although Hertzka was not a Zionist, many of her students were young women preparing to move and work in Palestine. Among them were Irene (née Pick) Aloni, Grete Blumenkranz, Elisabeth Boyko, Hanka Huppert-Kurz, Grete Salzer, Michal Selzer (formerly known as Felicia Sonnenschein), Gerti (née Brechner) Stern, and Lily Venezianer. Beginning in the early 1930s, Hertzka opened her home to refugees fleeing pogroms in other parts of Europe. As a member of the organization Israelitische Kultusgemeinde Wien (Jewish Community of Vienna), when Germany annexed Austria, she organized training courses at her school for Jews wishing to emigrate and provided secret refuge while they made arrangements to escape the country. Activist friends, such as Balch and Helene Scheu-Riesz, found potential employment positions and were willing to assist her in relocating to the United States. Hilda Clark made a similar proposal to help Hertzka arrange limited residency in Britain, but she chose not to accept these offers of help. Rather than face the risk that her school would be Aryanized, she gave the facility to her friend, composer Maria Hofer in 1937. She was forced to leave her home in Kaasgraben in early 1938.

== Business development and music publisher (1920–1938) ==
In the 1920s, Hertzka joined the Österreichische Gesellschaft zur Förderung der geistigen und wirtschaftlichen Beziehungen mit der UdSSR (Austrian Society for the Promotion of Intellectual and Economic Relations with the USSR). The association was aimed at cultural exchange and development of trade relations. Hertzka saw participation as a means to improve business and cultural relationships in favor of Universal Edition, but also as a means to forward women's equality and peace. In 1931, she organized the Paris Economic Conference to address worldwide issues during the Great Depression. Hertzka stressed the importance of unifying the European economy, which was adopted as one of the recommendations of the congress.

Emil, Hertka's husband, was hired by Universal Edition in 1901 and promoted to management in 1907. Under his administration, he transitioned the publishing house away from classical and traditional music and toward avant-garde and contemporary music. When he died in 1932, Hertzka took his place on the firm's board. She was the head of the business, which had become one of the most influential music publishers in Austria. During her tenure, she continued his work in promoting new talent, such as Gottfried von Einem, Arnold Schoenberg, and Wellesz. She also strove to include women's works among the firm's publications and promotions. In 1938, the business was Aryanized and Hertzka was expelled from Austria.

== Exile and later life (1938–1948) ==
Aware that a woman's nationality was tied to that of her husband, Hertzka decided to marry her cousin, Edgar Taussig, to gain his Czechoslovak nationality. As a Czech, she would be able to emigrate to England and travel freely. With help from her friend Hofer, in December 1938 Hertzka and Taussig married and she immigrated shortly afterwards. Hofer followed Hertzka to England, but was expelled because she was a German citizen. For the first six months, Hertzka lived in London at Wyldes Farm with friends, Ethel and Raymond Unwin, while trying to obtain a work permit. Having secured a permit to work as a domestic servant, she worked as a horticultural architect and a gardener. At various times, she supervised the gardening department for a tubercular sanatorium. The work required her to move frequently, and over a five-year period, she moved twenty-five times. Her idealized middle-class ideas of gardening as a profession vanished during her exile, but she chose to continue the arduous work to maintain her independence. Often without food, warm blankets, and intellectual stimulation, Hertzka relied on her WILPF network to supply her with basic necessities and literature. Around 1944, she moved in with activist Emmeline Pethick-Lawrence because of health concerns. Hertzka had developed a heart condition from poor nourishment and hard labor, as well as a skin disease which caused discomfort.

Hertzka became active in the London branch of the WILPF, traveling to Paris in 1939 to attend a meeting of the executive committee on refugees. During the war, women in the British section of the WILPF faced similar issues concerning the commitment to pacifism, as had faced the Austrian branch during World War I. The debate among the executive was whether Hitler should be stopped by any means possible, or whether the commitment to pacifism was absolute. In votes on the issue in 1940 and 1942, the majority of the board rejected that violence should ever be used to maintain peace. Because their activities were limited by the war, the main focus of the WILPF for the duration was assisting members to escape from Axis nations, but they also campaigned for the rights of conscientious objectors, particularly after changes were made to the British conscription laws in 1941.

Hertzka's husband, Taussig, was exterminated on 19 May 1943 at Theresienstadt concentration camp. When the war ended, she chose not to renew her Czech passport and reapplied for Austrian nationality. Pending its approval, she obtained an Austrian visa from the Allied Control Council, as she was stateless. She returned to Austria in 1946 and worked to re-establish the Austrian branch of the WILPF. She attended the WILPF congress of 1946 held in Luxembourg, having to stand on the train for the entire journey. Her last attendance at a WILPF function was in July 1948, when she met with the international executive board in Geneva. In the fall of 1946, she was appointed as the administrator for Universal Edition. She was able to recover control of Universal Edition in March 1947, but because of legal disputes with the building custodian was unable to take possession of the facility and begin rebuilding the business. She also attempted to recover her property in Kaasgraben, but was unable to do so prior to her death.

== Death and legacy ==
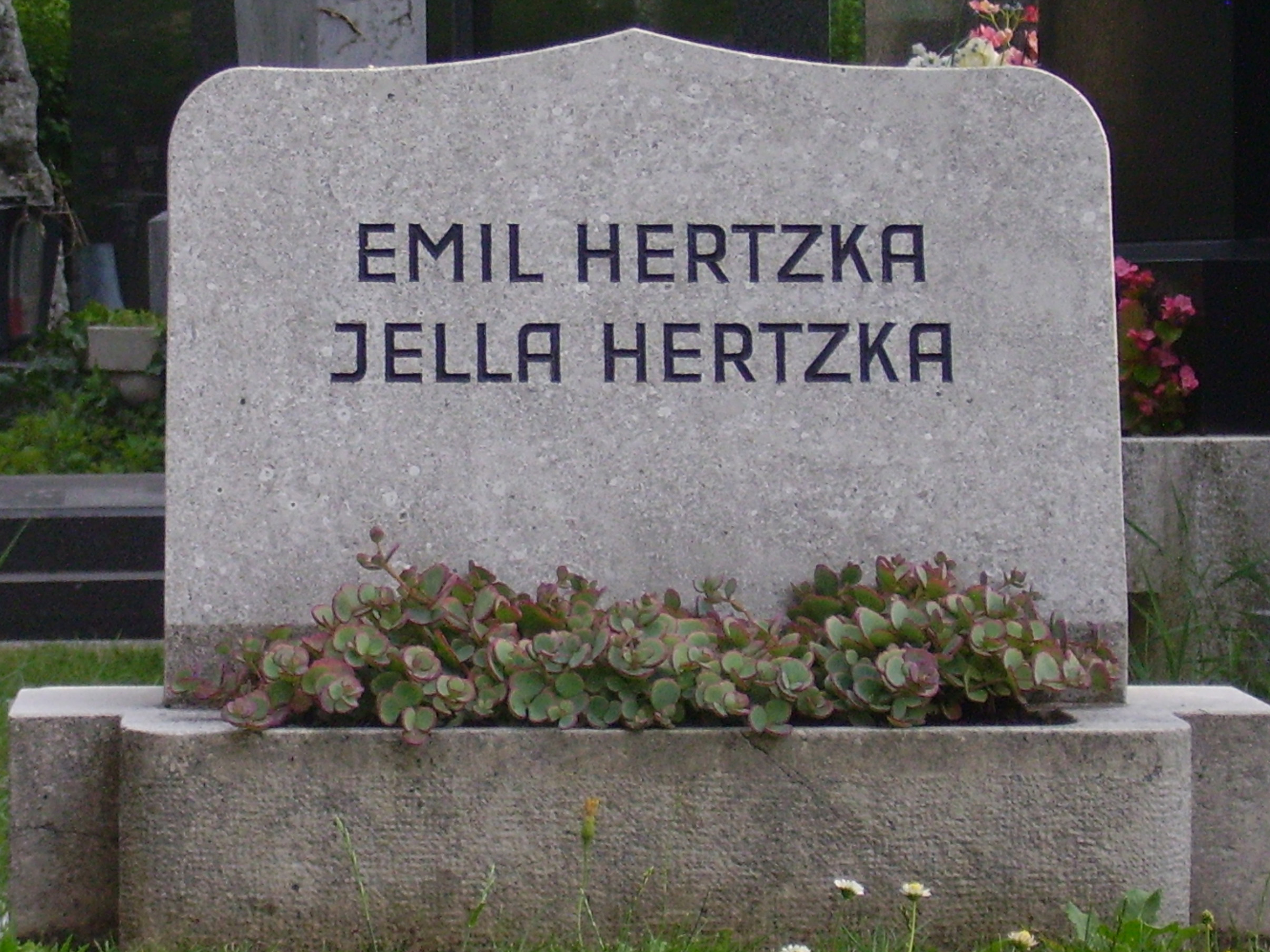
Emil and Yella's grave marker

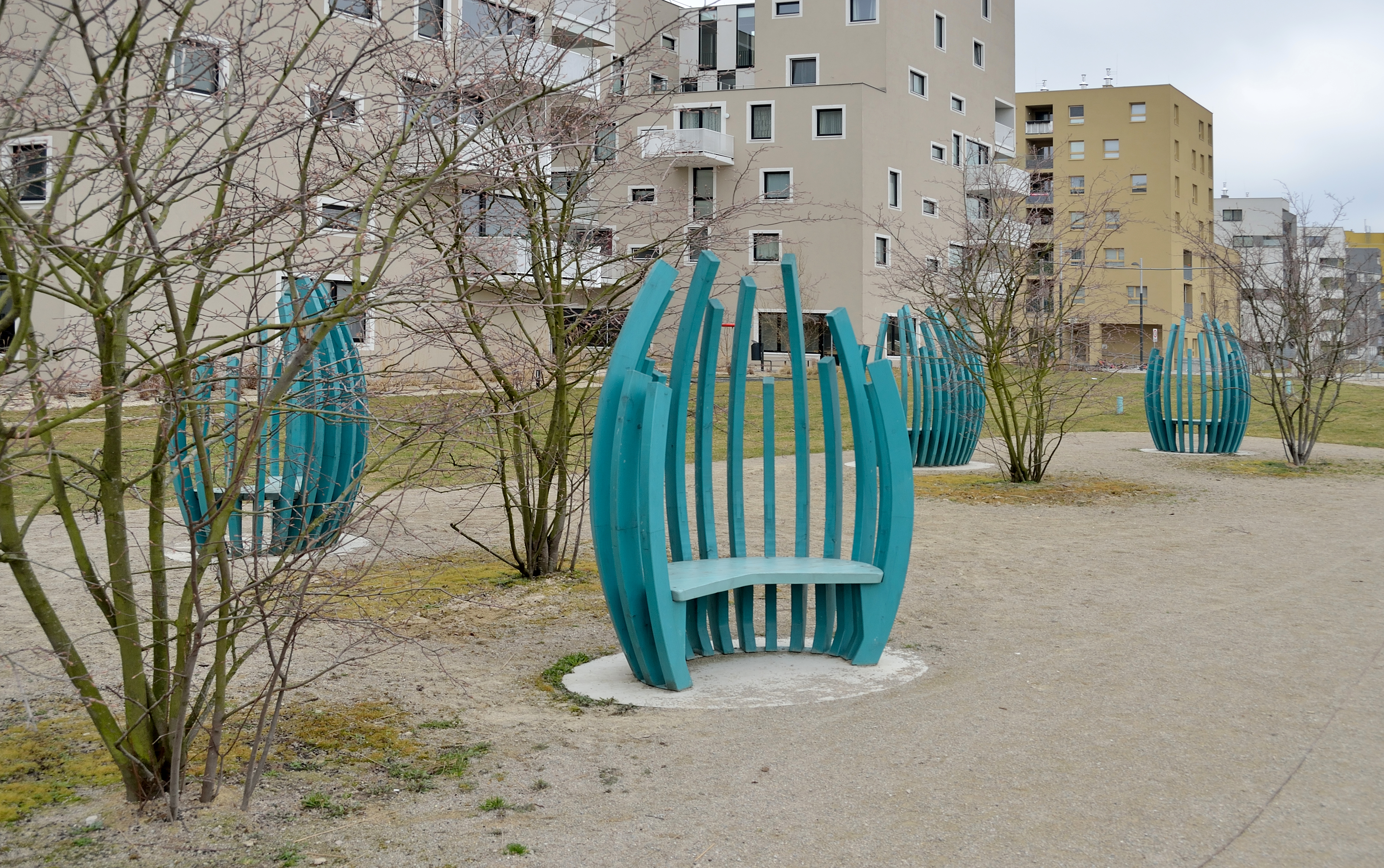
Benches, Yella Hertzka Park

Hertzka died in Vienna on 13 November 1948, without recovering her nationality. Three years after her death, Universal Edition was able to re-establish the business. When she died, she was recognized as one of the leading women's rights activists in Austria and in the international women's movement. An obituary in Austrian Information stated that her death would have a noticeable impact on the music industry of Vienna. Per scholar Corinna Oesch, despite Hertzka's prominence, she fell into obscurity, only partly because many of the records by and about her had been destroyed during the Nazi takeover and all of the institutions she created had been Aryanized. The remains of her personal estate in the archives of Universal Edition were likely sent to Hofer in the 1960s, per a letter in the archives, and are presumed lost, as Hofer destroyed her own correspondence and records prior to her death. Oesch also observed that an overall lack of interest in women's history, and indifference from academics in studying women's contributions, also contributed to her erasure, as did the fact that many records pertaining to her life are "scattered in archives around the globe".

In the twenty-first century, scholars like Elisabeth Malleier began to recover the history of the Austrian activists and the women's movement. According to scholars Iris Meder and Ulrike Krippner, Hertzka's school played a crucial role in opening the fields of horticulture and landscaping architecture to women. Oesch, who has extensively researched Hertzka's life, wrote that while Fridtjof Nansen is often credited with the international repatriation of prisoners of war after World War I, Hertzka's lectures were significant in promoting awareness of the issue and raising funds on behalf of prisoners. In 2012, the City Council of Vienna established a park in the Seestadt Aspern neighborhood which bears her name.

== See also ==
- List of peace activists
