= Margarethe Jodl =

German translator and writer (1859–1937)

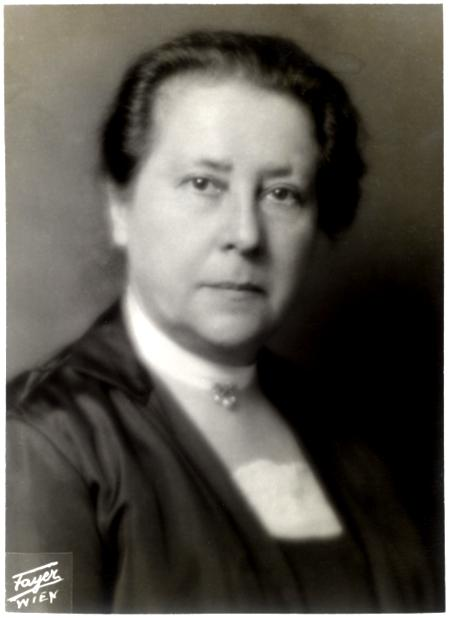
Margarethe Jodl

Margarethe Jodl, also Margarete, née Förster (1859–1937) was a German translator and writer who is remembered for supporting the women's movement in Austria. In November 1900, together with Yella Hertzka and three others, she founded and chaired the Viennese Women's Club (Erster Wiener Frauenklub). The organization was however not very successful and in 1903 gave way to the Neue Frauenklub (New Women's Club). Married to the German philosopher Friedrich Jodl, she supported his educational ambitions until his death in 1914. Thereafter she was active in the Viennese adult education initiative Wiener Volksbildungsverein.

== Biography ==
Born on 11 August 1859 in Dresden, Kingdom of Saxony, Margarete Förster was the daughter of the writer and art expert Karl Förster and his chamber singer wife. In 1882, she married the Munich philosopher and psychologist Friedrich Jodl, supporting him in his educational ventures.

She is remembered in particular for her activities in the Austrian women's movement. On 15 November 1900, together with Yella Hertzka, Marie Lang, Helene Riesz and Dora Stockert-Meynert, she founded the Viennese Women's Club (Erter Wiener Frauenklub). As the organization's chair, Jodl gave the welcoming address. The organization was however not very successful and in 1903 gave way to the Neuer Frauenklub (New Women's Club) which she did not join.

After her husband's death in 1914, she continued to be active on the board and committees of the educational enterprise Wiener Volksbildungsverein in which he had been a leading figure. In 1920, she published a biography of Friedrich Jodl, Friedrich Jodl : sein Leben und Wirken; dargestellt nach Tagebüchern und Briefen.

Margarethe Jodl died in Vienna on 14 March 1937.
