= Maria Hofer =

Austrian musician

Maria Hofer (1894–1977) was a renowned organist, pianist and composer. The daughter of an accomplished female singer, she was born in Amstetten, Lower Austria. Already as a child she was learning the organ, and within a few years was permitted to participate in church services as organist.

Maria Hofer’s later musical education took place at the University of Music and Performing Arts in Vienna, where she studied piano teaching. She also began an organ study, but soon resigned because she did not get along with her teacher. According to Maria Hofer's Curriculum Vitae written in 1966/1967 and other auto/biographical documents her tutors included Franz Schmidt, Hermann Graedener, Ernst Ludwig, and Richard Stöhr. Her ability to improvise at the organ was fostered by the organist of St. Stephan's Cathedral, Victor Boschetti; she began to compose in earnest during the First World War.

One of Maria Hofer's non-performing roles was to advise the Viennese publishing-house Universal Edition about organ works; she herself described the post as important for her musical development, since it brought her into contact with many prominent artistic figures, including Maurice Ravel, Alexander Zemlinsky, Darius Milhaud, Béla Bartók, Zoltán Kodály, Alfredo Casella, Alma Mahler, Franz Werfel, and Stefan Zweig.

Universal Edition also published some of her compositions, including the 'Toccata für Orgel' (1937). This work was dedicated to the composer's long-time friend, Yella Hertzka, the wife of UE's director Emil Hertzka and an active feminist. Between 1926 and 1938, in fact, Maria Hofer lived in the house of the Hertzkas. Yella Hertzka was also a leading member of the Austrian branch and the international executive committee of the 'Women's International League for Peace and Freedom' (WILPF), which Maria Hofer joined at Friederike Zweig-Winternitz's suggestion, and for which she created a 'peace anthem' in 1925.

After Emil Hetzka's death in 1932, Yella Hertzka joined the board of directors of the public company Universal Edition and continued to support Maria Hofer's career. After the National-socialists came into power in Austria both women had to leave Vienna. Yella Hertzka gained a Czech passport by marrying Egdar Taussig in order to emigrate to England, while Maria Hofer made her home in Kitzbühel after having been expelled from England as citizen of the German Reich. Along with her friend Elsa Welwart, Maria Hofer was arrested due to the denunciation of a neighbour in July 1941. The following month she was transferred to the prison in Innsbruck being accused of 'insulting the Führer', 'listening to forbidden foreign broadcast stations' and 'food stockpiling'. When she was released eight months later, she returned home to find that several manuscripts of her compositions, together with important correspondence from Franz Werfel, Stefan Zweig, Arnold Schoenberg, and others had disappeared.

Maria Hofer resumed her concert-giving activities, mostly performing her own compositions, already before 1945. After the end of war, she once more tried to restart her career as a composer, with contract compositions, concerts, radio broadcasts and publications. Among her works from this time are several liturgical compositions. Thanks partly to her efforts, an active musical life developed in Kitzbühel during the two decades after 1945.

This success was not sustained, however, and Maria Hofer died impoverished and disappointed; shortly before her death she destroyed many of her compositions. Among the unpublished works that were thus lost to posterity was a 'Passacaglia' for organ which had once prompted a reviewer to write: 'If Maria Hofer had written only this Passacaglia, her name should be never forgotten in organ literature'. The loss of such a large proportion of her output makes modern evaluation of her compositional abilities difficult.

The estate of Maria Hofer is located in the city archive in Kitzbühel. The research Institute "Brenner Archiv" at the University of Innsbruck has catalogued her musical inheritance.

Conducted by Bernhard Sieberer a selection of Maria Hofer's work was recorded under the title "Totentanz" (Dance of the Dead) in 2007.
