= Alfred Jodl =

German general and war criminal (1890–1946)

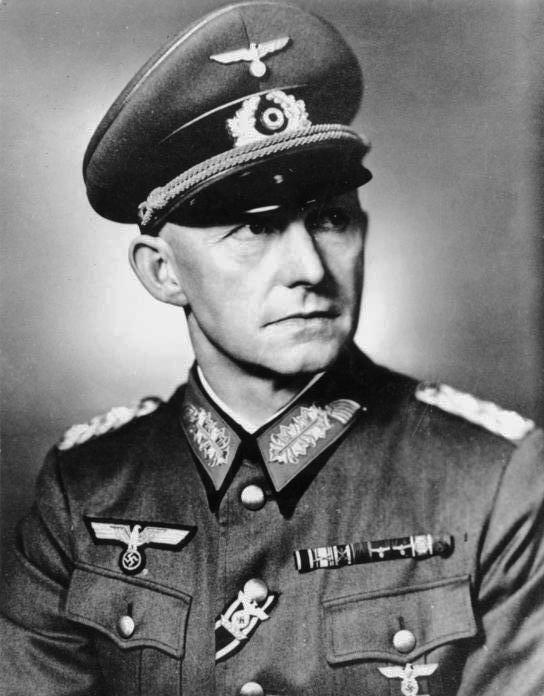
- Jodl in 1940

Chief of the Operations Staff of the Wehrmacht High Command
- In office 1 September 1939 – 13 May 1945
- Superior: Wilhelm Keitel
- Deputy: Walter Warlimont (1938–1944)
- Preceded by: Max von Viebahn

Chief of the Wehrmacht High Command
- In office 13 May 1945 – 23 May 1945
- Preceded by: Wilhelm Keitel
- Succeeded by: Office abolished

Personal details
- Born: Alfred Josef Baumgärtler; 10 May 1890 Würzburg, Bavaria, Germany
- Died: 16 October 1946 (aged 56) Nuremberg Prison, Bavaria, Germany
- Spouses: Irma Gräfin von Bullion (m. 1913; died 1944) Luise von Benda (m. 1945)
- Relations: Ferdinand Jodl (brother)
- Relatives: Friedrich Jodl (uncle)

Military service
- Allegiance: German Empire; Weimar Republic; Nazi Germany
- Branch/service: Imperial German Army; Reichswehr; German Army
- Years of service: 1910–1945
- Rank: Generaloberst
- Battles/wars: World War I World War II (executed)
- Awards: Knight's Cross of the Iron Cross
- Criminal information
- Status: Executed by hanging
- Convictions: Conspiracy to commit crimes against peace; Crimes of aggression; War crimes; Crimes against humanity
- Trial: Nuremberg trials
- Penalty: Death

Alfred Josef Ferdinand Jodl (German: [ˈjoːdl̩]; born Alfred Josef Baumgärtler; 10 May 1890 – 16 October 1946) was a German military officer and convicted war criminal who served as the chief of the operations staff of the Oberkommando der Wehrmacht – the German Armed Forces High Command – throughout World War II.

After the war, Jodl was indicted on charges of conspiracy to commit crimes against peace, planning, initiating, and waging wars of aggression, war crimes, and crimes against humanity at the Allied-organised Nuremberg trials. The principal charges against him related to his signing of the criminal Commando and Commissar Orders. Found guilty on all charges, he was sentenced to death and executed in Nuremberg by hanging in 1946.

== Early life and career ==
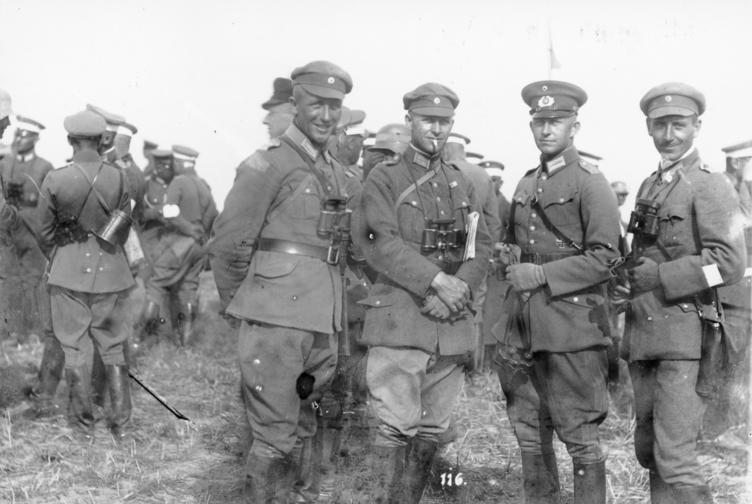
Alfred Jodl (second from right) as a captain of the Reichswehr with his brother Ferdinand (second from left), 1926

Alfred Jodl was educated at a military cadet school in Munich, from which he graduated in 1910. Ferdinand Jodl, who also became an army general, was his younger brother. He was the nephew of philosopher and psychologist Friedrich Jodl at the University of Vienna. Jodl was raised Roman Catholic but rejected the faith later in life.

From 1914 to 1916, he served with a field artillery regiment on the Western Front, being awarded the Iron Cross 2nd Class for gallantry in November 1914, and for being wounded in action. In 1917, he served briefly on the Eastern Front before returning to the West as a staff officer. In 1918, he was awarded the Iron Cross 1st Class for gallantry in action. After the defeat of the German Empire in 1918, he continued his career as a professional soldier with the much-reduced German Army (Reichswehr). Jodl married twice: in 1913 and (after becoming a widower) in 1944.

== World War II ==
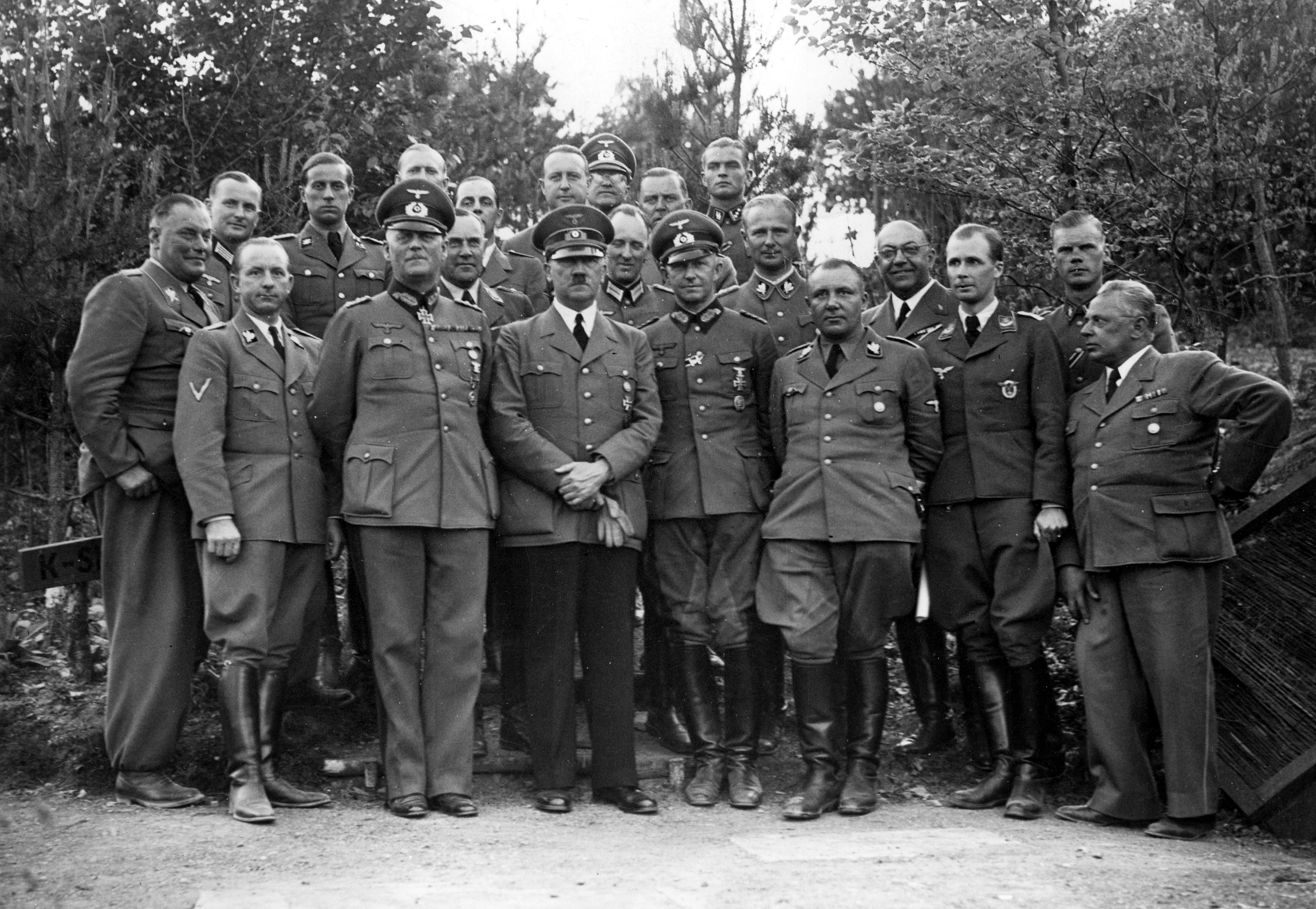
(front row, from l. to r.) Reichspressechef Otto Dietrich, Wilhelm Keitel, Hitler, Jodl, and Martin Bormann, at the Führer Headquarters of Felsennest, June 1940

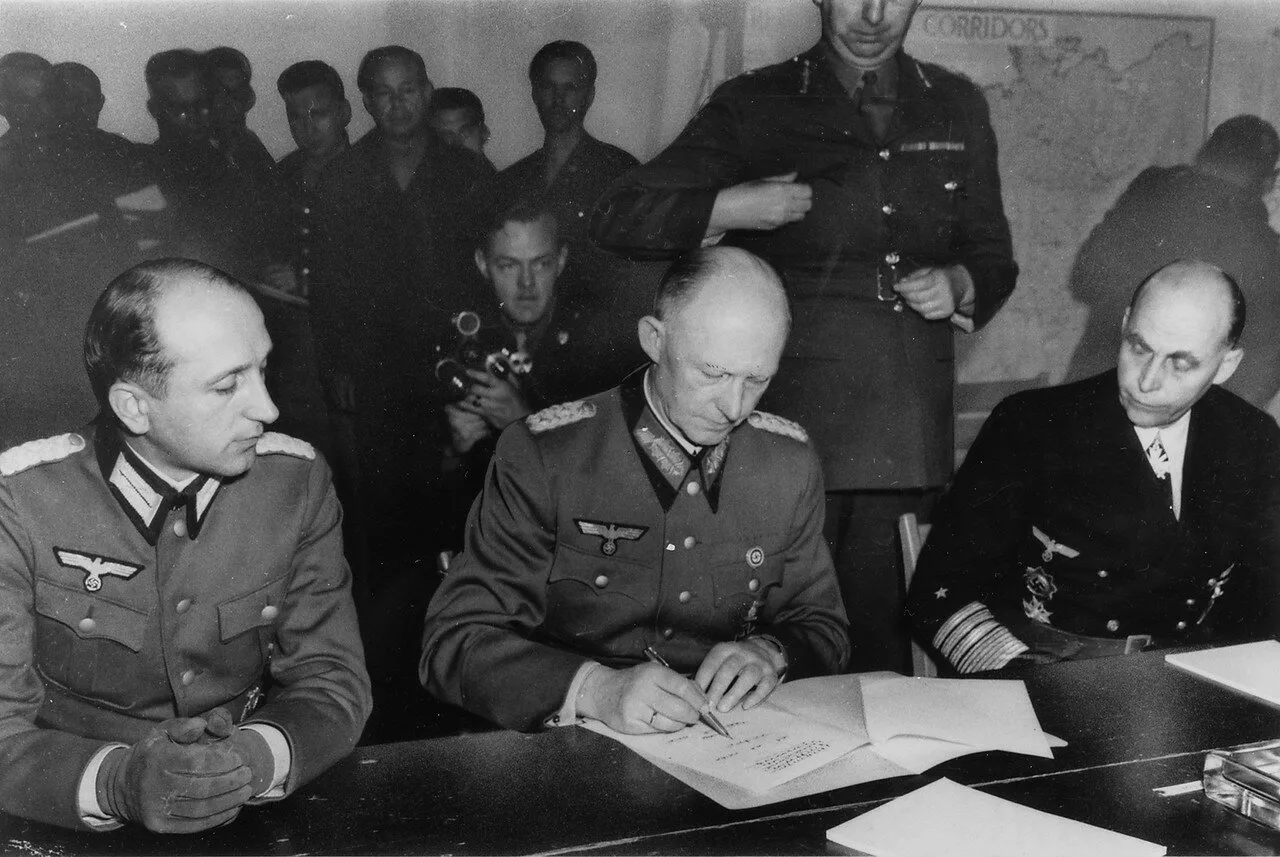
Jodl, seated between Wilhelm Oxenius and Hans-Georg von Friedeburg, signing the German Instrument of Surrender in Reims, 7 May 1945

Jodl's appointment as a major in the operations branch of the Truppenamt ('troop office') in the Army High Command in the last years of the Weimar Republic put him under the command of General Ludwig Beck. In September 1939, Jodl first met Adolf Hitler. During the build-up to the Second World War, Jodl was nominally assigned as commander of artillery in the 44th Division from October 1938 to August 1939 after the Anschluss.

He was chosen by Hitler to be Chief of the Operations Staff of the newly formed Oberkommando der Wehrmacht (OKW) on 23 August 1939, just prior to the German invasion of Poland. Jodl acted as chief of staff during the invasion of Denmark and Norway. Following the Fall of France, Jodl was optimistic of Germany's success over Britain, writing on 30 June 1940 that "The final German victory over England is now only a question of time."

Jodl signed the Commissar Order of 6 June 1941 (in which Soviet political commissars were to be shot) and the Commando Order of 28 October 1942 (in which Allied commandos, including properly uniformed soldiers as well as combatants wearing civilian clothes, such as Maquis and partisans, were to be executed immediately without trial if captured behind German lines).

Jodl spent most of the war at the Wolf's Lair, Hitler's forward command post in East Prussia. On 1 February 1944, he was promoted to the rank of Generaloberst ('colonel general', a four-star rank). He was among those slightly injured during the 20 July plot of 1944 against Hitler.

On 6 May 1945, Jodl was awarded the Knight's Cross of the Iron Cross by Grand Admiral Karl Dönitz, who had succeeded Hitler on 30 April 1945 as head of Germany and its armed forces.

Following regional surrenders of German forces in Europe, Jodl was sent by Dönitz to respond to the demand for "immediate, simultaneous and unconditional surrender on all fronts." Jodl signed the German Instrument of Surrender on 7 May 1945 in Reims on behalf of the OKW. The surrender to all the Allies was concluded on 8 May in Berlin. On 13 May, on the arrest of Generalfeldmarschall Wilhelm Keitel, Jodl succeeded him as Chief of OKW.

== Trial and conviction ==
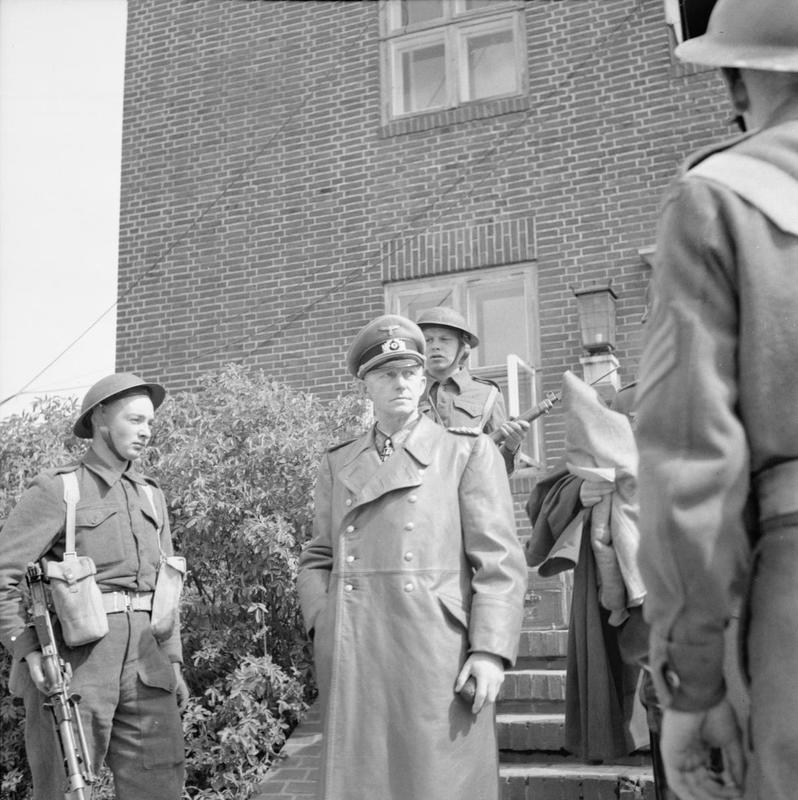
Jodl being arrested by British troops on 23 May 1945, at the Sportschool of the Mürwik Naval School near Flensburg

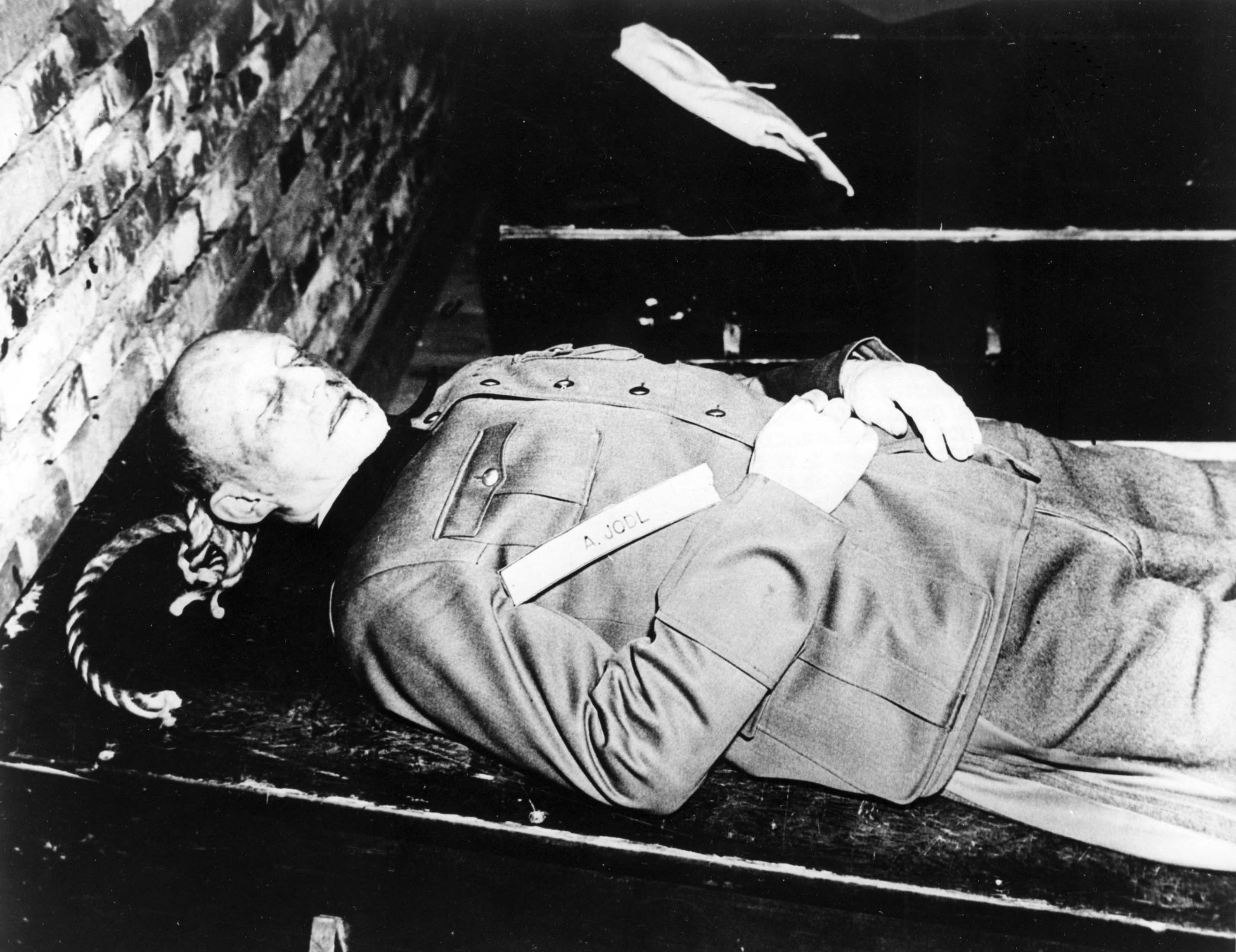
Jodl's body after his execution, 16 October 1946

Jodl was arrested, along with the rest of the Flensburg Government of Dönitz, by British troops on 23 May 1945 and transferred to Camp Ashcan and later put before the International Military Tribunal at the Nuremberg trials. He was accused of conspiracy to commit crimes against peace; planning, initiating and waging wars of aggression, war crimes and crimes against humanity. The principal charges against him related to his signature of the Commando Order and the Commissar Order, both of which ordered that certain classes of prisoners of war were to be summarily executed upon capture. When confronted with the 1941 mass shootings of Soviet POWs, Jodl claimed the only prisoners shot were "not those that could not, but those that did not want to walk".

Additional charges at his trial included unlawful deportation and abetting execution. Presented as evidence was his signature on an order that transferred Danish citizens, including Jews, to Nazi concentration camps. Although he denied his role in this activity of the regime, the court found him complicit based on the evidence it had examined, with the French judge Henri Donnedieu de Vabres, dissenting.

His wife Luise attached herself to her husband's defence team. Subsequently, interviewed by Gitta Sereny, researching her biography of Albert Speer, Luise alleged that in many instances the Allied prosecution made charges against Jodl based on documents that they refused to share with the defence. Jodl nevertheless proved that some of the charges made against him were untrue, such as the charge that he had helped Hitler gain control of Germany in 1933.

Jodl pleaded not guilty "before God, before history and my people". Found guilty on all four charges, he was hanged at Nuremberg Prison on 16 October 1946. Jodl's last words were reportedly "I salute you, my eternal Germany" ("Ich grüße Dich, mein ewiges Deutschland").

His remains, like those of the other nine executed men and Hermann Göring (who had killed himself prior to his scheduled execution), were cremated at Ostfriedhof and the ashes were scattered in the Wenzbach, a small tributary of the River Isar to prevent the establishment of a permanent burial site which might be enshrined by Neo-Nazis. A cross commemorating him was later added to the family grave on the Frauenchiemsee in Bavaria. In 2018, the local council ordered the cross to be removed; however, in March 2019, a Munich court upheld Jodl's relatives' right to maintain the family grave, while noting the family's willingness to remove his name.

== Posthumous legal action ==
On 28 February 1953, after his widow, Luise, sued to reclaim her pension and his estate, a West German denazification court posthumously declared Jodl not guilty of breaking international law, based on Henri Donnedieu de Vabres's 1949 disapproval of Jodl's conviction. This not guilty declaration was revoked by the Minister of Political Liberation for Bavaria on 3 September 1953, following objections from the United States; the consequences of the acquittal on Jodl's estate were, however, maintained.

== Promotions ==
- 10 July 1910 Fähnrich (Officer Cadet)
- 28 October 1912 Leutnant (2nd Lieutenant)
  - 26 September 1919 received a new Patent from 28 October 1910
- 14 January 1916 Oberleutnant (1st Lieutenant) with Patent from
- 28 September 1921 Rittmeister (Captain) with effect from 1 July 1921
  - 1 February 1922 received Rank Seniority (RDA) from 18 October 1918
  - 30 August 1922, renamed to Hauptmann with effect from 1 October 1922
    - He was initially promoted to cavalry captain (Rittmeister) as he was serving in Fahr-Abteilung 7 in 1920. His rank designation changed to Hauptmann upon acceptance as a general staff officer and on return to the artillery branch.
- 1 February 1931 Major with Rank Seniority (RDA) from 1 May 1929
- 1 October 1933 Oberstleutnant (Lieutenant Colonel)
- 1 August 1935 Oberst (Colonel)
- 31 March 1939 Generalmajor (Major General) with effect from 1 April 1939
- 19 July 1940 Generalleutnant (Lieutenant General) with Rank Seniority (RDA) from 1 July 1940
  - He was simultaneously promoted to Generalleutnant and General der Artillerie on the same day, in effect skipping the former rank.
- 19 July 1940 General der Artillerie with Rank Seniority (RDA) from 1 July 1940
- 30 January 1944 Generaloberst with Rank Seniority (RDA) from 1 February 1944

== Awards and decorations ==
- Bavarian Prince Regent Luitpold Medal in Bronze (Prinzregent-Luitpold-Medaille) on the ribbon of the Anniversary Medal for the Army on 3 March 1911
- Iron Cross (1914), 2nd and 1st Class
  - 2nd Class on 20 November 1914
  - 1st Class on 3 May 1918
- Military Merit Order (Bavaria), 4th Class with Swords (BMV4X/BM4X) on 12 August 1915
- Military Merit Cross (Austria-Hungary), 3rd Class with War Decoration (ÖM3K) on 14 June 1917
- Wound Badge (1918) in Black
- Reich Sports Badge (Deutsches Reichssportabzeichen) in Bronze and Gold
  - Bronze in 1921
  - Gold in 1931
- Chilean Order of Merit, Officer's Cross on 16 March 1934
- Honour Cross of the World War 1914/1918 with Swords on 5 December 1934
- Wehrmacht Long Service Award, 4th to 1st Class
- Order of the Crown of Italy, Commander's Cross on 29 September 1937 (permission to accept and wear by Hitler on 18 November 1937)
  - for supporting Mussolini and high-ranking Italian officers during the Wehrmacht manoeuvres in September 1937; Jodl spoke and wrote Italian and French fluently
- Royal Hungarian Order of Merit, Commander's Cross (permission to accept and wear by Hitler on 12 August 1938)
- Anschluss Medal on 21 November 1938
- Sudetenland Medal
- Repetition Clasp 1939 to the Iron Cross 1914, 2nd and 1st Class
  - 2nd Class on 30 September 1939
  - 1st Class on 23 December 1939
- Imperial Order of the Yoke and Arrows, Encomienda con Placa No. 94 (Grand Commander / Grand Officer with star/plaque) on 20 January 1941
- Order of the Cross of Liberty (Finland), 1st Class with Star and Swords on 25 Match 1942
- Order of the Sacred Treasure (Japan), Grand Cross on 26 September 1942
- Golden Party Badge on 30 January 1943
- Order of Michael the Brave (Romania), 3rd and 2nd Class on 23 December 1943
- Wound Badge "20 July 1944" in Black
- Knight's Cross of the Iron Cross with Oak Leaves on 10 May 1945 as Generaloberst and Chef des Wehrmachtführungsstabes im OKW (Dönitz-Erlaß)

== Bibliography ==
- "Defendants in the Major War Figures Trial". University of Missouri–Kansas City: School of Law. Archived from the original on 20 May 2009.
- "Alfred Jodl | German general". Encyclopædia Britannica.
- "Alfred Jodl". Alfred Jodl Second World War.
- "VG München, Urteil vom 26 März 2019 – M 12 K 18.1936" [Administrative court Munich, judgment of 26 March 2019] (in German). Bayerische Staatkanzlei. Archived from the original on 16 April 2019.
- "Los argumentos de la defensa de ALFRED JODL en los juicios de Nuremberg". tercer-reich.com (in Spanish). 23 March 2011. Archived from the original on 30 November 2018.
- "Streit über Gedenkstein: Familie von NS-Kriegsverbrecher darf Scheingrab behalten" [Disputed memorial stone: family of war criminal allowed to keep gravestone] (in German). Der Spiegel (newspaper). 8 April 2019.
- "Das Jodl-Kreuz auf der Fraueninsel kommt weg - Grab bleibt bestehen" [Jodl's cross on the Fraueninsel to be removed, grave will remain] (in German). Passauer Neue Pressee, (newspaper). 23 February 2018. Archived from the original on 10 July 2018.
- Buchheim, Eveline; Futselaar, Ralf (2014). Under Fire: Women and World War II: Yearbook of Women's History/Jaarboek voor Vrouwengeschiedenis 34. Uitgeverij Verloren. ISBN 978-90-8704-475-6.
- Crowe, David M. (2013). Crimes of State Past and Present: Government-Sponsored Atrocities and International Legal Responses. Routledge. ISBN 978-1317986829.
- Davidson, Eugene (1997). The Trial of the Germans: An Account of the Twenty-two Defendants Before the International Military Tribunal at Nuremberg. University of Missouri Press. ISBN 0-8262-1139-9.
- Darnstädt, Thomas (13 September 2005). "Ein Glücksfall der Geschichte". Der Spiegel. No. 14.
- Görlitz, Walter (1989). "Keitel, Jodl and Warlimont". In Barnett, Correlli (ed.). Hitler's Generals. London: Weidenfeld & Nicolson. ISBN 978-0802139948.
- Jodl, Alfred (1946). "A Short Historical Consideration of German War Guilt". In Office of United States Chief of Counsel For Prosecution of Axis Criminality (ed.). Nazi Conspiracy and Aggression, Volume VIII (PDF). Washington: United States Government Publishing Office.
- Manvell, Roger; Fraenkel, Heinrich (2011) [1962]. Goering: The Rise and Fall of the Notorious Nazi Leader. London: Skyhorse Publishing. ISBN 978-1-61608-109-6.
- Maser, Werner (2005). Nürnberg: Tribunal der Sieger [Nuremberg: Trial of Victors] (in German). Verlag Antaios. ISBN 978-3-935063-37-1.
- O'Keeffe, William J. (2013). A Literary Occupation: Responses of German writers in service in occupied Europe. Amsterdam: Rodopi. ISBN 978-9042037700.
- Overy, Richard J. (2001). Interrogations: The Nazi Elite in Allied Hands, 1945. New York: Viking. ISBN 978-0-670-03008-8.
- Scherzer, Veit [in German] (2007). Ritterkreuzträger 1939–1945 [The Knight's Cross Bearers 1939–1945] (in German) (2nd ed.). Ranis: Verlag Veit Scherzer. ISBN 978-3-938845-17-2. OCLC 891773959. Wikidata Q131160320.
- Scheurig, Bodo (1997). Alfred Jodl. Gehorsam und Verhängnis. Berlin: Propyläen. ISBN 3-549-07228-7.
- Sereny, Gitta (1995). Albert Speer: His Battle with Truth. New York: Knopf. ISBN 0-394-52915-4.
- Shepherd, Ben (2016). Hitler's Soldiers: The German Army in the Third Reich. Yale University Press. ISBN 9780300179033.
- Shirer, William (1990). The Rise and Fall of the Third Reich: A History of Nazi Germany. Simon & Schuster. ISBN 0-671-72868-7.
- Thomas, Franz (1997). Die Eichenlaubträger 1939–1945 Band 1: A–K [The Oak Leaves Bearers 1939–1945 Volume 1: A–K] (in German). Osnabrück, Germany: Biblio-Verlag. ISBN 978-3-7648-2299-6.
- Tofahrn, Klaus W. (2008). Das Dritte Reich und der Holocaust (in German). Frankfurt am Main: Peter Lang GmbH. ISBN 978-3-63157-702-8.

Military offices
Preceded by Wilhelm Keitel	Chief of the Oberkommando der Wehrmacht; 13 May 1945 – 23 May 1945	Succeeded by None; Position abolished
Preceded by Wilhelm Keitel	Chief of the OKH General Staff; 13 May 1945 – 23 May 1945	Succeeded by None; Position abolished
