= Bernhard Sieberer =

Austrian choirmaster and conductor (born 1963)

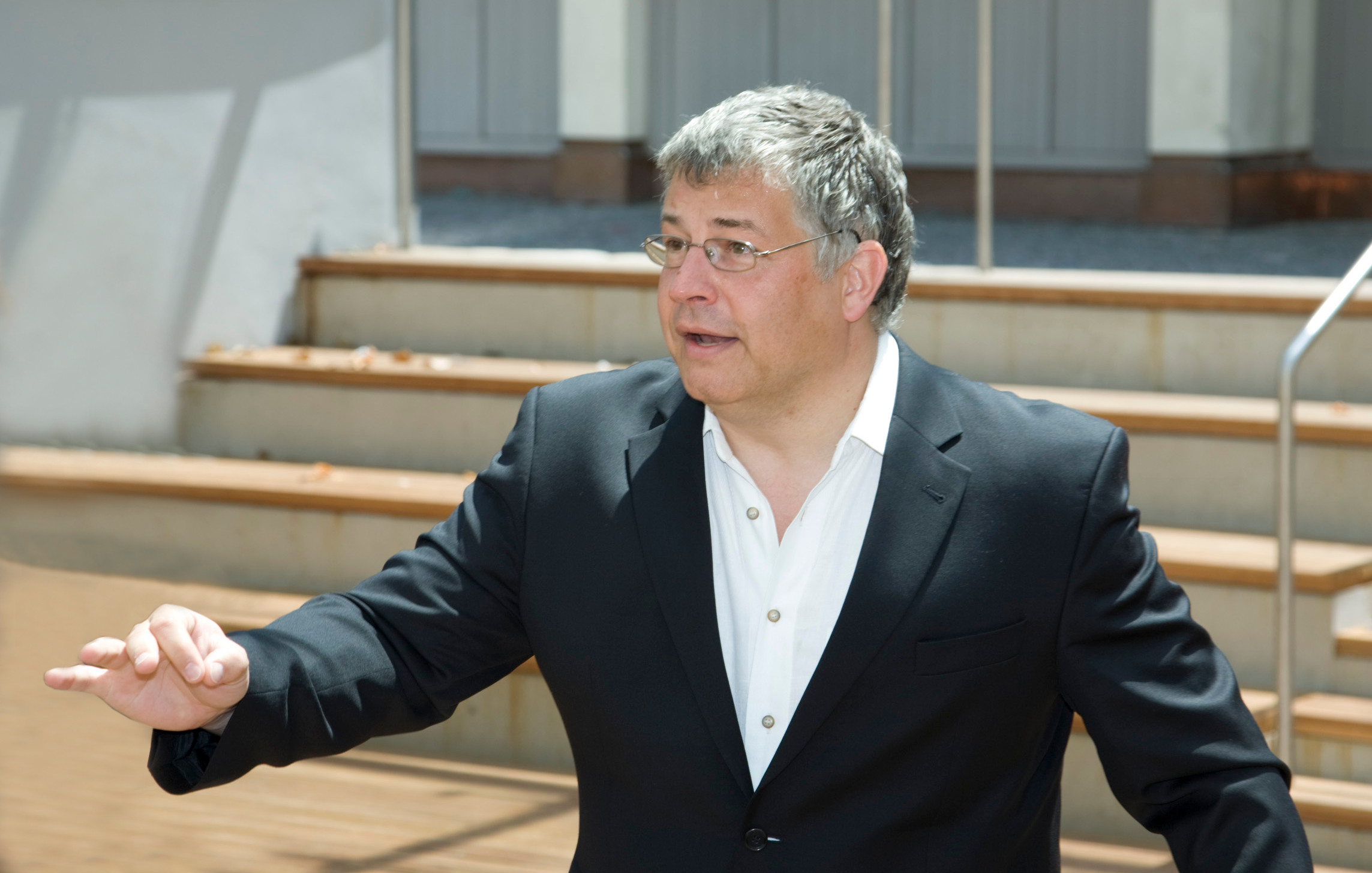
Bernhard Sieberer

Bernhard Sieberer (born 12 January 1963 in St. Johann in Tirol) is an Austrian choirmaster and conductor.

== Education and teaching ==
Bernhard Sieberer studied conducting with Edgar Seipenbusch at the Innsbruck Conservatory, and attended master classes with Sergiu Celibidache in Mainz, Gustav Kuhn in Milan, and Michael Gielen at the Mozarteum Salzburg (funded by the Alban Berg Foundation of Vienna). From 1986 to 1992 he acted as musical director for the "Europasommer" in Fiecht in Tyrol. Since 1988 he has been teaching conducting, baton technique and choral conducting, also as assistant of Gustav Kuhn in the field of symphony music. He has also headed the two-year seminar for choir conductors offered by the "Tiroler Sängerbund" ("Tyrolean Choir Association"). From 2008 to 2010 he taught in Egypt, where he was in charge of sustainable musical development at the Sekem Initiative and at the Heliopolis Academy in Cairo. Sieberer was formerly principal guest conductor of the chamber choir Jauna Muzika in Vilnius and has been cultural commissioner of the town of Kufstein since 1993. Since 2015 he has been presenting a radio show featuring choir music.

== Artistic activities ==
Choirmaster

1990 to 2008 and 2011 to present: choirmaster of the chamber choir Collegium Vocale Innsbruck.
1991 to present: permanent choirmaster of the vocal ensemble Vocapella Innsbruck.
2012 to present: choirmaster of Chor der Vielfalt (choir of diversity), an amateur choir in Innsbruck committed to cultural integration and diversity.
2015: Sieberer establishes the "Innsbrucker Jugendchor" (youth choir of Innsbruck, JUKO) for which he also functions as choirmaster.

Theatre

In 1992 he was in charge of staging and rehearsal of the theatre music for the "Volksschauspiele Telfs". From 1995 to 2001 he conducted Werner Pirchner's incidental music for Hugo von Hoffmannsthal's Jedermann at the Salzburg Festival. In 1997 he conducted the world premiere of Werner Pirchner's Shalom – Choräle für Streichorchester at the festival "Steirischer Herbst". In 2013 he acted as musical director of the "Passionsspiele Erl".

Conducting

In 1990 he made his conducting debut with the Vienna Chamber Orchestra at the Konzerthaus Vienna and the Brucknerhaus in Linz. Since then he has worked with a number of international choirs and orchestras and performed at Steirischer Herbst, Salzburg Festival, Slovakian Philharmonics, Innsbruck Festival of Early Music and Tiroler Feststpiele Erl. Many of his performances have been recorded on CD or have been broadcast on national and international radio and television. This includes two recordings of contemporary Tyrolean music: the CD „strings“, a complete collection of music for strings by Werner Pirchner, and the CD „Totentanz“, featuring music by Maria Hofer. An ongoing collaboration with the Slovakian chamber orchestra Capella Istropolitana has produced a number of recordings which have been published under the title "...im Gespräch" ("... in conversation"). These feature a conscious engagement with the deconstruction of, reflection on and performance of a number of well known musical works. The aim of this engagement is to cultivate a more in-depth understanding and more nuanced listening of these often-played pieces. Such recordings of works by Mozart and Beethoven have already been released, and work is on going on pieces by Haydn, Schubert, Mendelssohn, as well as a selection of 20th-century music.

Repertoire

Bernhard Sieberer has a broad repertoire: it includes choral works from the Renaissance up until the 21st century and orchestral pieces by a variety of composers, ranging from Bach to Bruckner, from Mozart to Mahler, from Beethoven to Britten, and from Purcell to Pirchner. A main focus has been orchestral choir music by Monteverdi and Schütz. Sieberer regularly conducts works by Handel, Bach, Haydn, Mendelssohn and Brahms, as well as Bruckner, Orff and Honegger, and also contemporary music.

== Selected works ==
- Werner Pirchner – strings (Capella Istropolitana, Litauisches Kammerorchester, Camerata St. Petersburg), ORF 2002
- Wolfgang Amadeus Mozart – Fagottkonzert, Oboenkonzert, Klarinettenkonzert (Richard Galler, Dominik Wollenweber, Wenzel Fuchs, Capella Istropolitana), RCR 2006
- Maria Hofer – Totentanz (Art of Brass, Hans Gansch, Andreas Öttl, Peter Sadlo und andere, Capella Istropolitana), RCR 2007
- Mozart im Gespräch – Divertimenti in D-Dur und F-Dur, Eine kleine Nachtmusik, Klavierkonzert Nr. 11 in F-Dur (Carlo Grante, Cappella Istropolitana), RCR 2008
- Wolfgang Amadeus Mozart – Klavierkonzerte Nr. 10, 14 und 23 (Carlo Grante, Barbara Panzanella, Orchestra dell'Accademia Nazionale di Santa Cecilia, Roma), Music&Arts 2008
- Beethoven im Gespräch – Symphonie Nr. 7, Ouvertüre zu Egmont (Cappella Istropolitana), RCR 2010

== Sources ==
- Bernhard Sieberer in the Inventory of the Austrian National Library
