= Cappella Istropolitana =

Slovak chamber orchestra

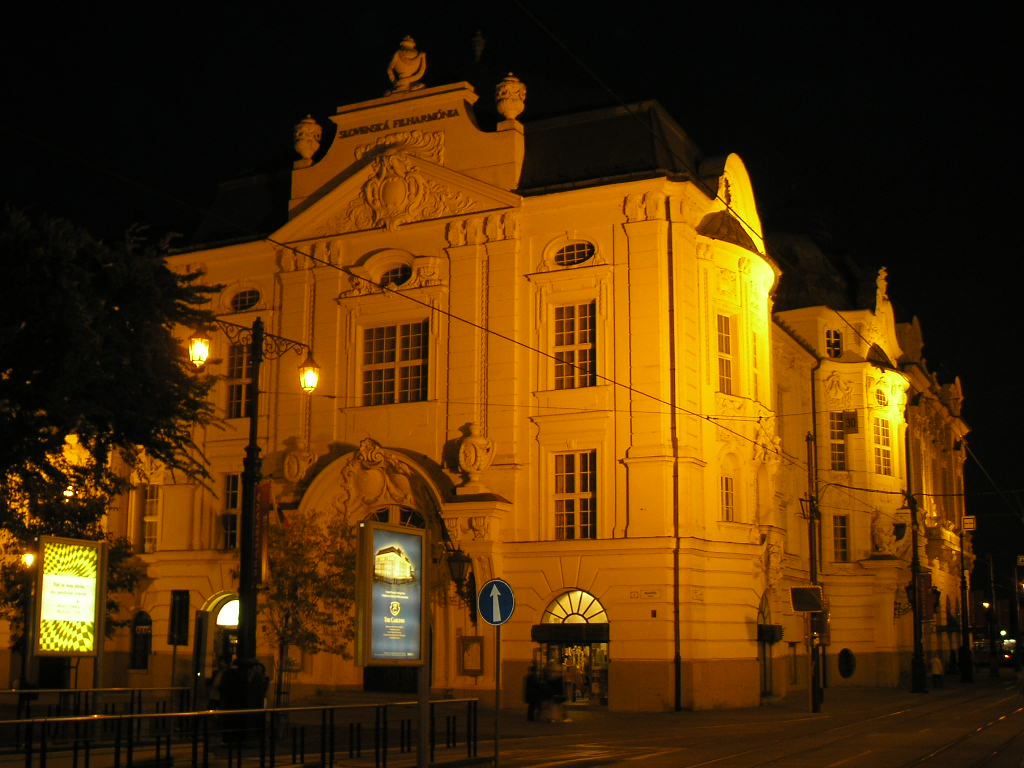
- Concert hall Reduta Bratislava, origin of the members of the Capella Istropolitana.

Background information
- Origin: Bratislava, Slovakia
- Years active: 1983 – present
- Labels: Naxos Records, Erato Records, Brilliant Classics

The Cappella Istropolitana is a Slovak chamber orchestra based in Bratislava, Slovakia. Its name is derived from the Greek name for Bratislava, Istropolis (city on the Danube).

The orchestra was formed in 1983, and in 1991 the Bratislava City council appointed the orchestra as the Chamber Orchestra of the City of Bratislava. The current conductor is Christian Brembeck.

== Concerts ==
The orchestra has performed in several countries in Europe and in United States, Canada, South Korea, China, Egypt, Israel, New Zealand, Peru, Chile, Uruguay and Argentina. It has appeared at festivals such as the Schleswig-Holstein Festival in northern Germany, the Prague Spring Festival in Czech Republic, the Strasbourg Festival in France, the Carinthischer Sommer, the Rheingau Festival, the Ludwigshafen, Nice, Nancy, Murten and Bern.

Its repertoire includes baroque, classical, romantic and 20th century works.

The orchestra has no principal conductor and has been directed by its concertmaster, violinist Robert Marecek, since 1996.

== Famous soloists and conductors ==
- Christian Brembeck, conductor
- Alfred Brendel, piano
- Barbara Hendricks, soprano
- Jenő Jandó, piano
- Cyprien Katsaris, piano
- Jaroslav Kreček, conductor
- Boris Mironovič Pergamenščikov, cello
- Takako Nishizaki, violin
- Bernhard Sieberer, conductor
- Martin Sieghart, conductor
- Stefan Vladar, piano
- Johannes Wildner, conductor
- Barry Wordsworth, conductor
- Frank Peter Zimmermann, violin
- Otto Sauter, trumpet
