= Helene Lecher =

Austrian philanthropist (1865–1929)

- Lecher in her nursing habit, c. 1915
- Born: Helene von Rosthorn; 8 September 1865; Vienna, Austrian Empire
- Died: 4 October 1929 (aged 64); Vienna, Austria
- Other names: Frau Hofrath Lecher; Frau Hofrath von Lecher; Helene Lecher-Rosthorn
- Occupations: Hospital kitchen administrator; nurse; women's rights activist; philanthropist

Helene Lecher (née von Rosthorn; 8 September 1865 – 4 October 1929) was an Austrian women's rights activist and philanthropist. During World War I she served as a nurse and later as a hospital kitchen administrator, establishing nutrition protocols for patients. Born into a well-to-do family in Vienna, she was tutored at home, learning English, French, German and Italian, as well as art and music. After both her parents died when she was young, she moved with a sister to Prague around 1890 to live with an older brother. There, she was involved with the German School Association and participated in cultural events. She married a physics professor and had a daughter in 1899 but continued to perform in theater and sing at events.

In 1909, the Lechers moved to Vienna, when her husband was appointed to head the physics department at the University of Vienna. She became involved in the faculty wives' cultural programs and joined the Allgemeiner Österreichischer Frauenverein (AÖF, General Austrian Women's Association). She represented the organization at the 1915 Women at the Hague Congress, which resulted in the formation of the Women's International League for Peace and Freedom (WILPF). During the war, she worked first as a nurse and then administered the kitchens for two different hospitals, establishing dietary standards for patients. When the war ended, she converted two of the former hospital barracks in the Grinzing District of Vienna into a facility for children which provided housing for orphans, a children's play garden, a clinic, and a distribution center for food and clothing. She also campaigned for another barracks to be rehabilitated into housing for university students.

A committed pacifist, Lecher attended the 1921 WILPF Congress in Vienna, wrote articles and urged government officials to adopt policies that would maintain peace and expand women's spheres of interest. She was involved in drafting recommendations for the professionalization of social welfare workers and encouraged the government to develop policies which allowed citizens to present their grievances. She died after being injured in a hit-and-run accident with a bicycle in 1929 and was memorialized for her philanthropic work.

== Early life and education ==
Helene von Rosthorn was born on 8 September 1865 in Vienna, within the Austrian Empire, to Baroness Josefine von Mandorff and Josef von Rosthorn. Her father was the head of the Iron and Brass Factory in Oed, but lived in Vienna. The Rosthorn Family were industrialists who had created the brass industry in Austria. Her maternal grandmother descended from the Esterházy families of Hungary, who provided support for Joseph Haydn and other musicians. The couple had seven children – Alfons (1857–1909), Gisela (1859–1862), Emil (1860–1878), Arthur (1862–1945), Maria (1863–1951), Helene, and Carl (1868–1888). All of the children were tutored at home and learned to read, write and speak English, French, German and Italian. Their primary tutor was Adolf Lorenz, who with his wife, Emma Lecher, were the parents of future Nobel Prize in Physiology or Medicine winner, Konrad Lorenz. They were also taught drawing and painting, deportment, and music.

After their father's death in 1886, Josefine took the younger children to her family estate in Arad County, Hungary. From a young age, Rosthorn was influenced by a caretaker on her mother's estate over the importance of diet in assisting recovery from illness. Josefine died in July 1890, and in accordance with local custom, upon her death the two surviving daughters, Helene and Marie, went to live with their oldest brother in Prague. Alfons was an obstetrician and gynecologist, who cared for the girls, and in turn, they kept his house. From 1895, Rosthorn was involved in theater productions with the Deutscher Schulverein (German School Association) of Prague. The group staged plays, recited poetry, and gave humorous lectures. Around this time, she married Ernst Lecher, a widower, whose first wife, Nathalie Heymann died in 1896. Lecher was the brother of her former tutor's wife, Emma. In 1899, the couple had their only child Grete, who later married Herbert Magg, a cellist for the Vienna Philharmonic Orchestra. Lecher continued to perform, and earned praise for singing with Auguste V. Ludovici the duet of Frau Fluth and Frau Reich in a 1902 presentation of The Merry Wives of Windsor. In 1909, the family moved to a villa at Cottagegasse 30, Vienna, when Ernst was appointed as head of the physics department at the University of Vienna.

== Career ==
By 1913, Lecher had become an active member of several faculty wives' committees which organized social events for various departments at the university. She also joined the Allgemeiner Österreichischer Frauenverein (AÖF, General Austrian Women's Association). At the outset of World War I, Lecher began working as a nurse, specializing in patients' dietary needs. Thanks to family connections, she won a position to organize the hospital kitchen at the 500-bed facility of the American Red Cross in the Meidling District of Vienna. Although she had little time for meetings, when she read about the peace congress planned for 1915, she made arrangements to attend. She was one of the five Austrian delegates at the International Congress of Women at the Hague. The congress established the International Committee of Women for Permanent Peace, subsequently known as the Women's International League for Peace and Freedom (WILPF). Lecher's presentation, which Mary Heaton Vorse called the "most moving speech of all the Congress", urged peace and pointed out the absurdity of waging war as a pretense of protection, when in reality it was destroying families. She had wanted to talk about supply and food shortages, but the press committee refused to allow her to disclose those details.

When the delegates returned, Lecher, along with Leopoldine Kulka, Rosa Mayreder, Olga Misař, and Francis Wolf-Cirian gave a presentation on world peace to the members of the AÖF. Later that year, she published "Ein Frauenwort" ("A Woman's Word") in the journal Para Pacem (Prepare Peace). The article questioned why women's social roles were limited to helping the poor and nursing. She asked whether man's intent was to force women to build international networks and to stop populating the world. When Arnold Durig became head of a 6,000-bed hospital for the Grinzing District barracks, Lecher established nutrition standards for the patients and specialty food services for those with dietary conditions.

After the war, in 1919 Lecher turned two of the Grinzing barracks into a day care and clinic for abandoned children. Initially, the center allowed children to come for a nutritious noon meal and remain so that health officials could check them or they could play until twilight. Lecher announced in February 1919 that she hoped to be able to provide lodging for those with severe needs. After receiving a 100,000K donation from the Wittgenstein family, the former hospital barracks were renovated in 1920. Accommodations, a children's play garden, and a convalescent and health care area with specialized equipment were established. Lecher operated the center, which served around 200 children, solely on private donations, which were raised in Austria, Germany, the Netherlands, and the United States with the help of Hermine Wittgenstein and Margaret Stonborough-Wittgenstein. Food and clothing were donated by the Austrian and Danish Red Cross organizations and by international hospital relief networks, and distributed to children in need.

In 1921, Lecher attended the WILPF Congress of Vienna and spoke about her work in the children's hospital. She reported that as part of their care, she tried to educate children about the importance of internationalism. That year, she took part in the discussions of the Neuen Wiener Frauenklub (New Vienna Women's Club) to make recommendations to the Bundesamt für Sozialverwaltung (Federal Office for Social Administration) to professionalize the ranks of social welfare workers, including nurses, infant and youth workers, employees of non-profit organizations, and other social workers. They recommended that educational standards and references be met before securing posts as carers, and guidelines be established for fair compensation and reasonable working hours. She became a mediator representing homeless university students in 1922, urging authorities to convert one of the barracks which had not been repurposed into a student hostel. Lecher was part of a delegation representing the Society of Friends and Versöhnungsbundes (Union of Reconciliation) who urged the Chancellor of Austria in 1928 to develop a policy which allowed peasants to present their grievances, as a means of avoiding marches which led to social unrest and disrupted the peace.

== Death and legacy ==
Lecher was killed after a hit-and-run accident, when she was struck by a cyclist and incurred a skull fracture on 1 October 1929. Taken to the hospital, she died from her injuries on 4 October in Vienna. She was remembered in the obituary which appeared in Die Österreicherin for her care of the wounded during the war and her dedication to youth and the poor. Her work with the children at the Retreat for Weak Children was the basis for a setting in the novel Faber, oder die verlorenen Jahre (Faber or the Lost Years, 1924) by novelist Jakob Wassermann.
