= Wenzbach =

River in Munich

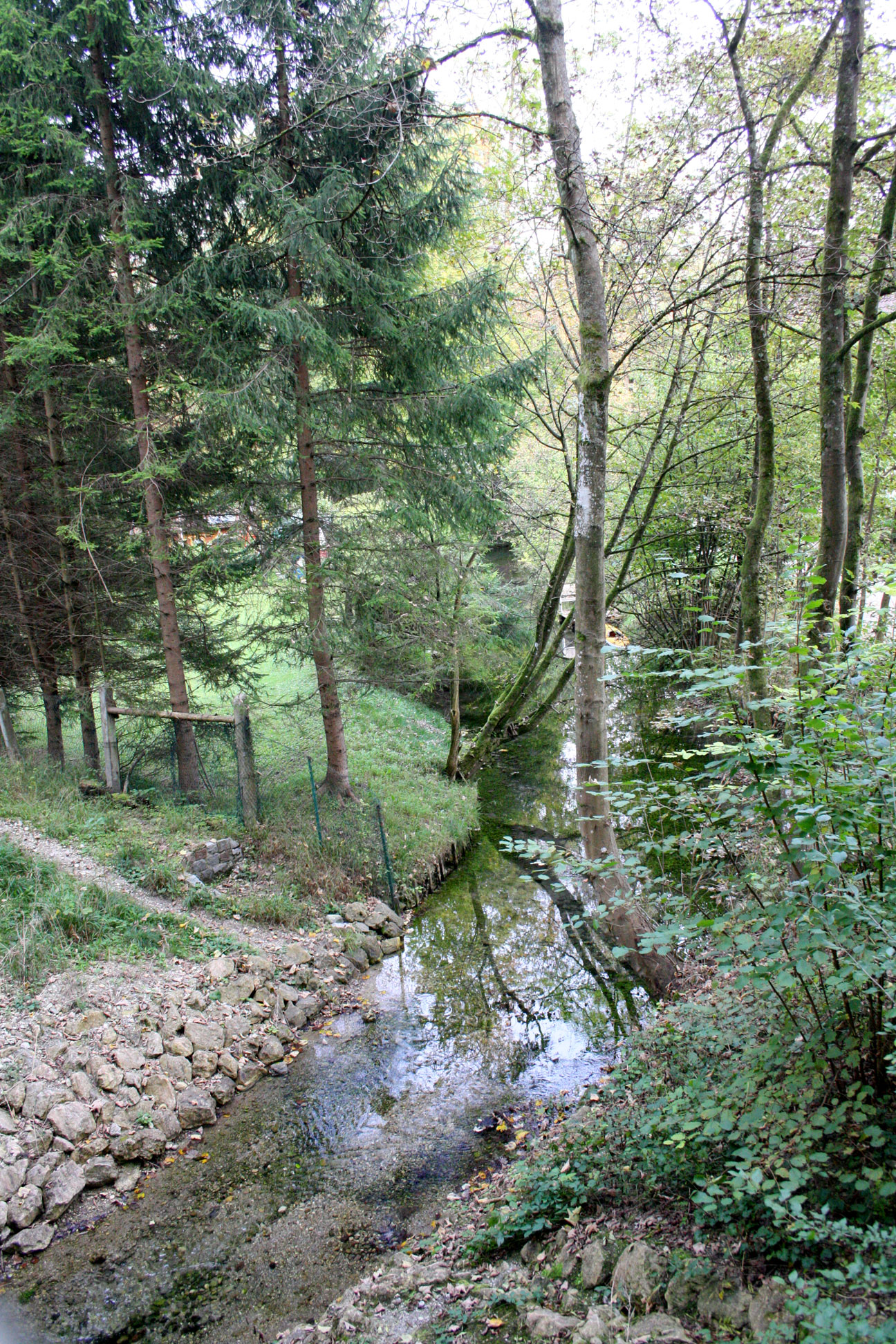
- Wenzbach at the northern end of the Adolf-Wenz-Siedlung

Location
- Country: Germany
- State: Bavaria

Physical characteristics
- Source
  - coordinates: 48°04′36″N 11°32′12″E
- Mouth
  - coordinates: 48°05′03″N 11°32′27″E
- Length: 1 km (0.62 mi)

The Wenzbach (German, 'Wenz brook') is a small 1-kilometre-long (0.62 mi) river, which rises in the district of Großhesselohe in the municipality Pullach and in the neighboring district of Thalkirchen in southern Munich, which flows from the left into the Floßkanal.

== History ==
Adolf Wenz (1840–1927), namesake of the settlement and the stream, ran a clinker brick factory below the Großhesseloher Brücke. In old mentions, the stream was therefore called Wenzscher Fabrikbach or simply Fabrikbach.

On Thursday, 17 October 1946, US soldiers scattered the ashes of eleven cremated war criminals of the Nuremberg trials in the Wenzbach, a small tributary of the River Isar to prevent the establishment of a permanent burial site which might be enshrined by nationalist groups.
