= Ferdinand Jodl =

German general and Knight's Cross recipient

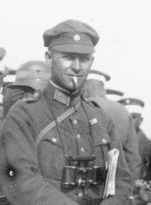
- Jodl in 1926
- Born: 28 November 1896; Landau, Kingdom of Bavaria, German Empire
- Died: 9 June 1956 (aged 59); Essen, West Germany
- Relatives: Alfred Jodl (brother); Friedrich Jodl (uncle)
- Military career
- Allegiance: German Empire; Nazi Germany
- Branch: German Army
- Service years: 1914–1945
- Rank: General der Gebirgstruppe
- Commands: XIX Mountain Corps
- Conflicts: World War I World War II
- Awards: Knight's Cross of the Iron Cross

Ferdinand Alfred Friedrich Jodl (28 November 1896 – 9 June 1956) was a German general during World War II who commanded the Mountain Corps Norway during the Petsamo–Kirkenes Offensive. He was the younger brother of Alfred Jodl, Chief of the Operations Staff of the OKW. He was the nephew of philosopher and psychologist Friedrich Jodl at the University of Vienna.

== Life and career ==
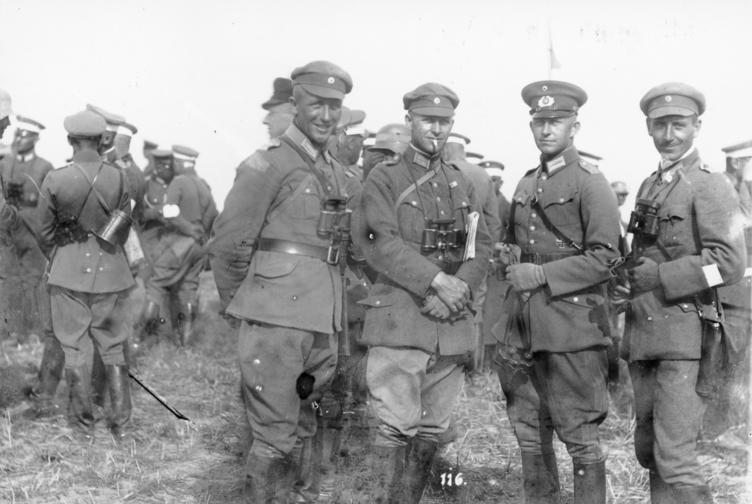
Ferdinand Jodl (second from left) as an Oberleutnant of the Reichswehr with his brother Alfred (second from right), 1926

Ferdinand Jodl entered the Imperial German Army in August 1914 as an ensign, serving as a Leutnant in a Bavarian Field Artillery Regiment from 1915 until the end of World War I. He remained in the army after 1918, becoming a general staff officer. In this capacity he served with XII Corps in the early part of World War II, then moving to XXXXIX Mountain Corps. From 1942 he served in Finland and North Norway, first as chief of staff of the 20th Mountain Army, then as commander of the XIX Mountain Corps, receiving the Knight's Cross of the Iron Cross for his command of this corps in January 1945. He ended the war as commander of German forces in North Norway, grouped under the name Army Detachment Narvik, having attained the rank of General of Mountain Troops.

Ferdinand Jodl died in Essen on 9 June 1956, aged 59 and was buried on Frauenchiemsee in Bavaria.

== Awards and decorations ==
- Knight's Cross of the Iron Cross on 13 January 1945 as General der Gebirgstruppe and commander of XIX. Gebirgskorps

Military offices
| Preceded by General der Gebirgstruppe Georg Ritter von Hengl | Commander of XIX. Gebirgs-Armeekorps; 15 May 1944 – 8 May 1945 | Succeeded by Organisation disbanded |
