= Friedrich Jodl =

German philosopher and psychologist

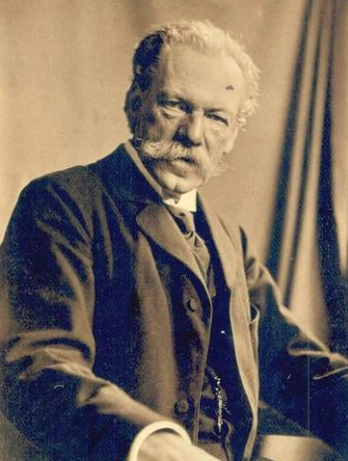
- Born: August 23, 1849; Munich, Kingdom of Bavaria
- Died: January 26, 1914 (aged 64); Vienna, Austria-Hungary
- Spouse: Margarethe Jodl
- Relatives: Alfred Jodl (nephew); Ferdinand Jodl (nephew)

Education
- Education: LMU Munich
- Academic advisor: Johann Nepomuk Huber

Philosophical work
- Era: 19th-century philosophy
- Region: Western philosophy
- School: Positivism
- Institutions: LMU Munich; University of Vienna
- Notable students: Victor Kraft
- Main interests: Ethics; Philosophy of religion

Friedrich Jodl (23 August 1849 – 26 January 1914) was a German philosopher and psychologist.

== Biography ==
Friedrich Jodl grew up in a Munich family association which, due to its proximity to the royal court, had provided numerous senior civil servants in Bavaria. The painter Heinrich Bürkel, a family friend, introduced him to the fine arts at an early age.

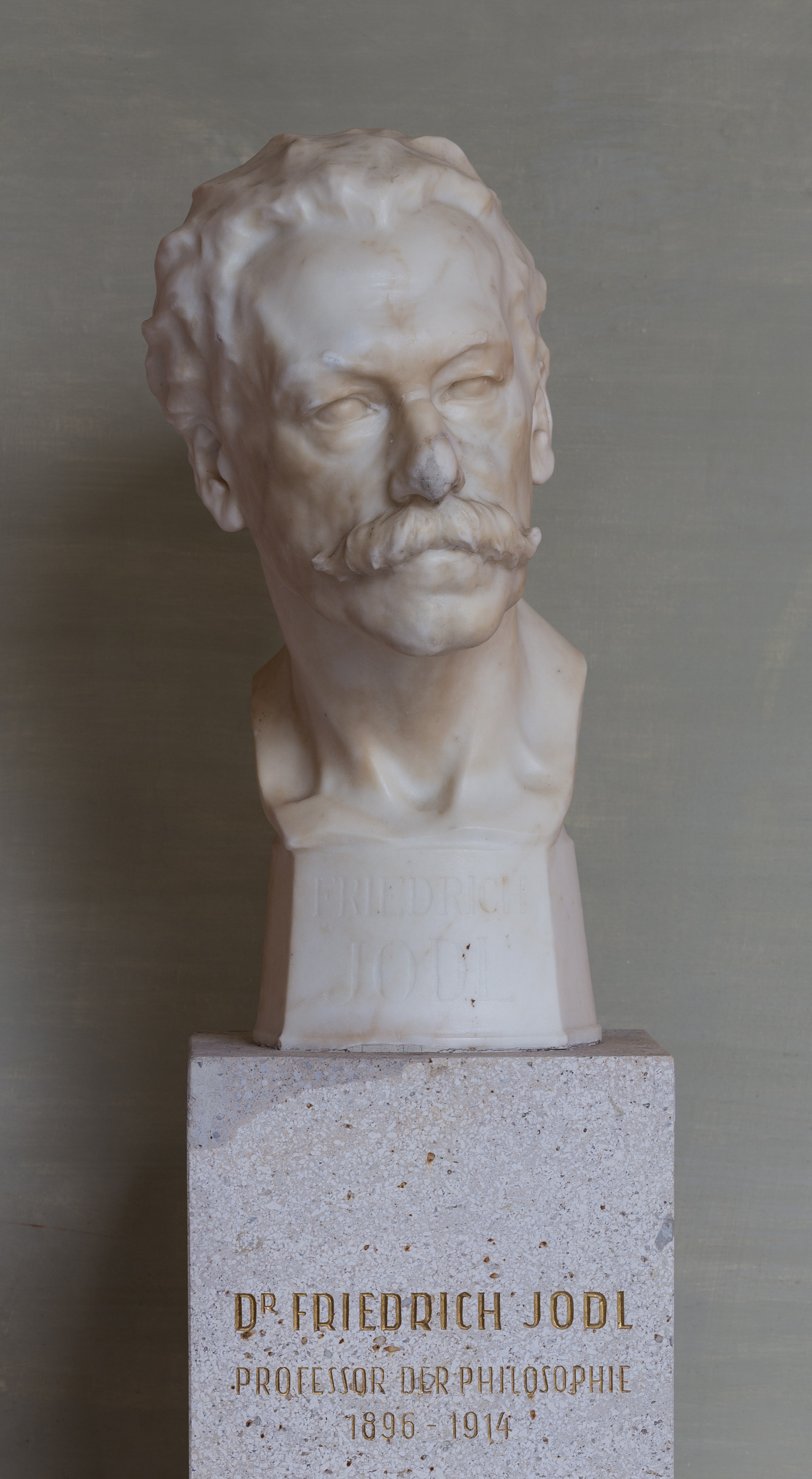
Bust of Friedrich Jodl in the Arkadenhof of the University of Vienna.

Jodl began studying history and art history at LMU Munich in 1867, but above all philosophy. His academic teachers included the philosophers Karl von Prantl, Johann Huber and Moriz Carrière. He received his PhD from LMU in 1872 with a thesis on David Hume. Jodl was then a lecturer at the Bavarian War Academy in Munich. After qualifying as a professor in philosophy, he accepted a professorship at the German University in Prague in 1885. In 1896 he took over a chair in philosophy at the University of Vienna and also taught aesthetics at the Technical University of Vienna. He was also a member of the Austrian Academy of Sciences.

In addition to his academic work, Jodl worked as head of the Viennese People's Education Association and as a sought-after speaker for the popularization and dissemination of scientific knowledge. As a representative of a positivism following Ludwig Feuerbach, he was against ultramontanism, which was very influential in Austria at the time, and campaigned for the freedom of science and against the influence of denominations, in Austria especially the Roman Catholic Church, in the public school system. He was a co-founder of the free-religious "German Society for Ethical Culture" and promoted, e.g., for a state compulsory school in which non-denominational morals instruction is given instead of religious instruction.

Friedrich Jodl had been married to the women's rights activist Margarete (née Förster) from 1882 and had no children.

He was the paternal uncle of the siblings and Nazi generals Alfred Jodl and Ferdinand Jodl.

Jodl died from a long illness in 1914. At the time of "Red Vienna", Jodlgasse in Hietzing in 1919 and the Professor-Jodl-Hof residential complex in Döbling in 1926 were named after him in recognition of his services to popular education. Jodl's activities contributed significantly to the intellectual climate in Vienna in the early 20th century, from which the Neopositivism of the Vienna Circle and thinkers related to it were heavily influenced.

A portrait bust by the Viennese sculptor Hans Mauer was placed in honor of Friedrich Jodl in the main courtyard of the University of Vienna.

== Works ==
- Leben und Philosophie David Humes. Preisschrift Halle: Pfeffer 1872
- Die Kulturgeschichtsschreibung, ihre Entwicklung und ihr Problem. Halle: Pfeffer 1878
- Geschichte der Ethik als philosophischer Wissenschaft. 2 Bände. Stuttgart: Cotta 1882–1889 (Nachdr. 1965ff)
- Volkswirtschaftslehre und Ethik. Berlin 1886
- Moral, Religion und Schule. 1892
- Wesen und Ziele der ethischen Bewegung in Deutschland. 1893
- Was heisst ethische Kultur? 1894
- Über das Wesen und die Aufgabe der ethischen Gesellschaft. 1895
- Lehrbuch der Psychologie. 2 Bände. Stuttgart: Cotta 1897 (^{2}1903, ^{3}1908, ^{4}1916) (Nachdr. 1983)
- Goethe und Kant. In: Philosophie und philosophische Kritik Bd. 120, 12-20, zuerst erschienen _engl, im Monist, Jan. 1901
- Was heisst Reformkatholizismus. 1902
- Ludwig Feuerbach. Stuttgart: Frommann 1904 (^{2}1921)
- Das Nietzsche-Problem. Separatabdruck. Vienna: Carl Konegen 1905
- Wissenschaft und Religion. 1909
- Aus der Werkstatt der Philosophie. 1911
- Der Monismus. 1911
- Vom wahren und vom falschen Idealismus. Leipzig: Kröner 1914
