= Stefanie Jodl =

German singer

- Born: August 4, 1998 (age 28); Landshut, Oberbayern
- Genres: volksmusik, schlager

Stefanie Jodl (born August 4, 1998) is a German volksmusik singer. She lives in Dorfen in Bavaria.

== Career ==
At the age of 10, in 2008, she released her first single, titled "Warum soll denn ein Mädchen kein Lausbub nicht sein". That year the song won the first place in the yearly Swiss Volksmuzik Hit Parade compiled by a Swiss internet portal dedicated to volksmusik.

In 2009, she released her first maxi single, titled "Mei beste Freundin".

Later that year she won at the Weißblauer Stammtisch festival, held in Töging am Inn by Radio ISW.

On January 8, 2011, she performed at ARD's volksmusik program Krone der Volksmusik. That was her biggest audience to date, the TV show is watched by every tenth German.

In the summer of 2011, she released her first album Megapowermadl, which contained 14 songs. The album was recorded in one day.

At the Traunreut Autumn Festival in October 2011, she won the Radio ISW's Weißblaue Hitparade. She won at the Hit Parade again in 2012.

In July 2012, she performed at the Rüßwihler Dorffest.

== Style ==
Stefanie Jodl sings in Bavarian and plays violin. Her role model is Stefanie Hertel. She can also play piano.

== Personal ==
In February 2017, she made her debut at the Vienna Opera Ball.

== Discography ==
=== Albums ===
Title	Album details
Megapowermadl	Released: February 22, 2012; Label: Ritt Sound
Jung fetzig Boarisch	Released: May 20, 2014; Label: Ritt Sound

=== Maxi singles ===
Title	Release date
Mei beste Freundin	July 2009

=== Singles ===
Year	Title
2008	"Warum soll denn ein Mädchen kein Lausbub nicht sein"
2016	"Farben dieser Welt"
	"Mit Vollgas durch die Nacht"
