= Elisabeth Boyko =

Austrian-Israeli botanist (1892–1985)

- אליזבת בויקו
- Born: 24 September 1892
- Died: 14 December 1985 (aged 93)
- Occupation: Botanist
- Known for: William F. Petersen Award
- Spouse: Hugo Boyko

Elisabeth Boyko (Hebrew: אליזבת בויקו; 24 September 1892 – 14 December 1985) was an Austrian-Israeli botanist noted for pioneering the use of salt water for irrigation of desert plants in Israel, alongside her husband Hugo Boyko. She received the William F. Petersen Award from the International Society of Biometeorology.

== Selected works ==
- Boyko, Elisabeth (1952). The building of a desert garden: the first year's experience of Elath at the north-eastern shore of the Red Sea. OCLC 474000312.
- Boyko, H; Boyko, Elisabeth (1959). Seawater irrigation: a new line of research on a bioclimatological plant-soil complex. International Society of Bioclomatiology and Biometeorology. OCLC 777926192.
- Boyko, Hugo; Boyko, Elisabeth (1964). Principles and Experiments Regarding Direct Irrigation with Highly Saline and Sea Water Without Desalination.
