= Olga Misař =

Austrian peace activist, feminist and writer

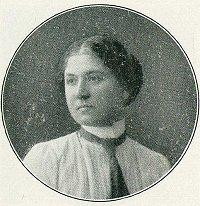
Olga Misař

Olga Misař née Popper (1876 – 1950) was an Austrian peace activist, feminist and writer. From 1910, she was active in Austrian activities related to the women's movement and suffrage. In April 1915, she represented Austria at the International Congress of Women in The Hague. She later became a board member of the Austrian branch of the Women's International League for Peace and Freedom while also participating in the central organization. For many years she was active in War Resisters' International (WRI) and in 1928 organized the second WRI Conference which was held in Sonntagberg, Austria. In April 1939, threatened by the Nazi regime, together with her husband and daughter, Olga Misař fled to Enfield near London where she joined the British branch of the International League for Peace and Freedom.

== Early life and family ==
Born in Vienna on 11 December 1876, Olga Popper was the daughter of the textile manufacturer Dietrich David Popper (1845–1925) and his wife Friederike née Engelsmann. Brought up initially by her Jewish parents in Vienna, from the age of 11 to 18 she lived in England becoming fully bilingual. On returning to Vienna, despite her parents' wishes she continued her studies thanks to the money she earned by teaching English. In 1899, she married the mathematics teacher Wladimir Misař (1872–1963) with whom she had twin daughters, Olga and Vera, in 1900.

== Career ==
Interested in women's affairs, from 1910 she was a board member of the Austrian Women's Association's discussion club and from 1911 to 1912, editor of a paper on the protection of motherhood, Mitteilungen des Österreichischen Bundes für Mutterschutz. In April 1915, as an active member of the Women's Association, she was one of the Austrian delegates at the International Congress of Women in The Hague. On her return to Austria, together with the other Austrian delegate Yella Hertzka, she founded the Austrian branch of the resulting Women's International League for Peace and Freedom (WILPF).

In 1917, Misař was a co-founder of the Österreichisch Friedenspartei (Austrian Peace Party) which was closely associated with the Women's Association. She participated in many of the organization's demonstrations, frequently encountering difficulties with the police. She put herself forward as a candidate in the February 1919 national election for the Demokratische Mittelstandspartei (Democratic Middle-Class Party) but was not elected.

From 1921, together with Hertzka, Misař was a board member of the Austrian branch of the WILPF. She was also active in the central WILPF organization, attending the annual meetings for some 15 years. As secretary of the Austrian branch of the War Resisters' International, she developed the organization in Austria, organizing the second War Resisters' International Conference (2. Internationale Konferenz der Kriegsdienstgegner) in Sonntagberg, Lower Austria, from 27 to 31 July 1928.

Under the government of Kurt Schuschnigg, the Austrian War Resistors' Alliance (Bund der Kriegsdienstgegner) was dissolved with the result that Misař could no longer be active in Austria. She did nevertheless continue her involvement in the international network. In March 1938, the home of Misař and her husband was searched and many of their books were confiscated. In April 1939, they fled to Enfield near London where they lived with their daughter Olga and her husband.

Olga Misař's exile with her husband was not easy. They found there were few opportunities for translation or tutoring and depended above all on support from their daughter's family. From 1942 to 1948 they moved to Huddersfield where Wladimir found an office job in a textile company. Thereafter they moved back to Enfield.

Olga Misař died in London on 8 October 1950.

== Publications ==
- Neuen Liebesidealen entgegen (Towards New Ideals of Love, 1919). Introduction by Brigitte Rath. Institut für Anarchismusforschung, Wien 2017, ISBN 978-3-9501925-8-2

== See also ==
- List of peace activists
