= Dora von Stockert-Meynert =

Austrian writer, poet and playwright

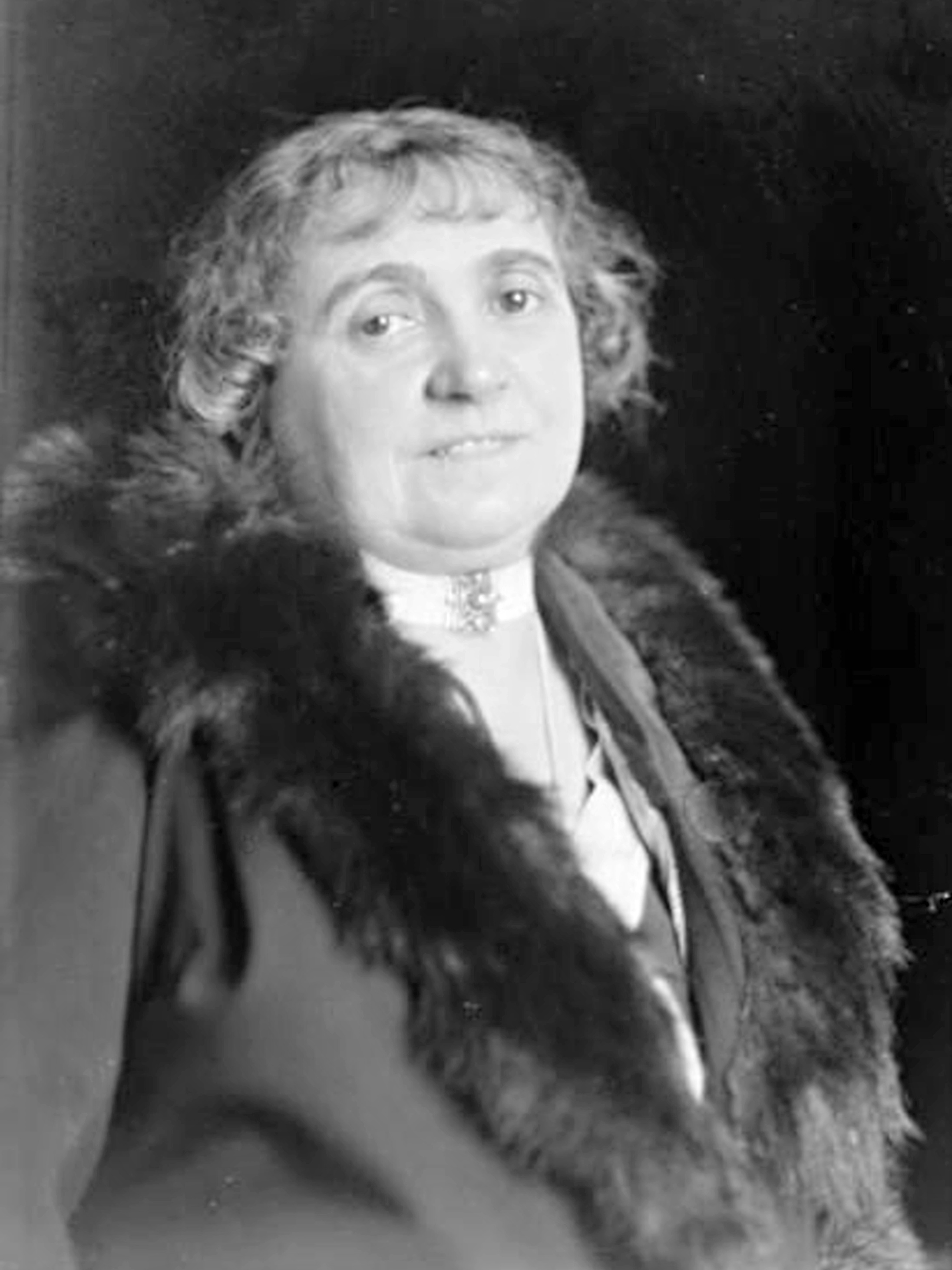
- Born: May 5, 1870; Vienna
- Died: February 24, 1947 (aged 76)
- Occupations: Writer, poet and playwright
- Spouse: Leopold von Stockert (m. 1889; died 1938)

Dora von Stockert-Meynert, born Theodora Meynert (May 5, 1870 – February 24, 1947), was an Austrian writer, poet and playwright.

== Life ==
Dora von Stockert-Meynert was the daughter of Johanna Meynert (1837-1879), the co-founder and first president of the Vienna Housewives Association, and the psychiatrist and university teacher Theodor Meynert. Her grandfather was the writer and critic Hermann Meynert.

In 1889 she married the civil servant Leopold von Stockert (1860-1938). They had four children, the daughters Emmi, Dorit and Margarethe and the son Franz Günther von Stockert, who worked as a psychiatrist.

In 1901 she published her first novel, Grenzen der Kraft ("Limits of Power"). She founded Panthea, the Association of Women's Artistic Organizations, and was a member of Concordia, an association of Austrian writers and journalists founded in 1859, which later became part of the Concordia Press Club, and a member of International PEN. After the end of the First World War she volunteered as President of the Association of Writers and Artists.

In 1926 she was awarded the Ebner Eschenbach Prize. In 1930 she authored the intellectual biography Theodor Meynert und seine Zeit ("Theodor Meynert and his time"). For the play Die Blinde ("The Blind") she received Niederösterreichischen Lands-Autorenpreis.

== Published works ==
- Grenzen der Kraft (novel, 1903)
- Sabine. Tragödie einer Liebe (novel, 1905)
- Vom Baum der Erkenntnis und andere Novellen (short stories, 1908)
- Und sie gingen in ihr Königreich (novel, 1912)
- Erzählungen (short fiction, published circa 1916 by Verlag der Karnisch-Julischen Kriegszeitung, Villach)
- Die Liebe der Zukunft (1920)
- Herr Palejuk (novel, published 1925 byEnßlin & Laiblin, Reutlingen)
- Euphorion (short stories, published 1926 by Reclam, Leipzig)
- Das Bild des Ilje (novel, published 1928 by Reclam, Leipzig)
- Theodor Meynert und seine Zeit (biography, published 1930 by Österreichischer Bundesverlag, Vienna)
- Vor dem Spiegel (novel, 1931)
- Kämpfer (novel, published 1932 by Helden, Toren)
- Spiegelbilder (poems, published 1937 by Gerstel, Vienna)
