= Stockert =

Stockert or von Stockert may refer to:

- Dora von Stockert-Meynert (1870–1947), Austrian writer, poet and playwright
- Juan Carlos Stockert (born 1940), Argentine physician
- Ludwig von Stockert
- Walter Stockert (born 1940, Vienna), Austrian philologist

== See also ==
- Stockert Radio Telescope, Astropeiler Stockert in the Eifel
- Stockert (hill) in the Eifel
