= Münstereifel Forest =

Coordinates: 50.5390247°N 6.8229383°E

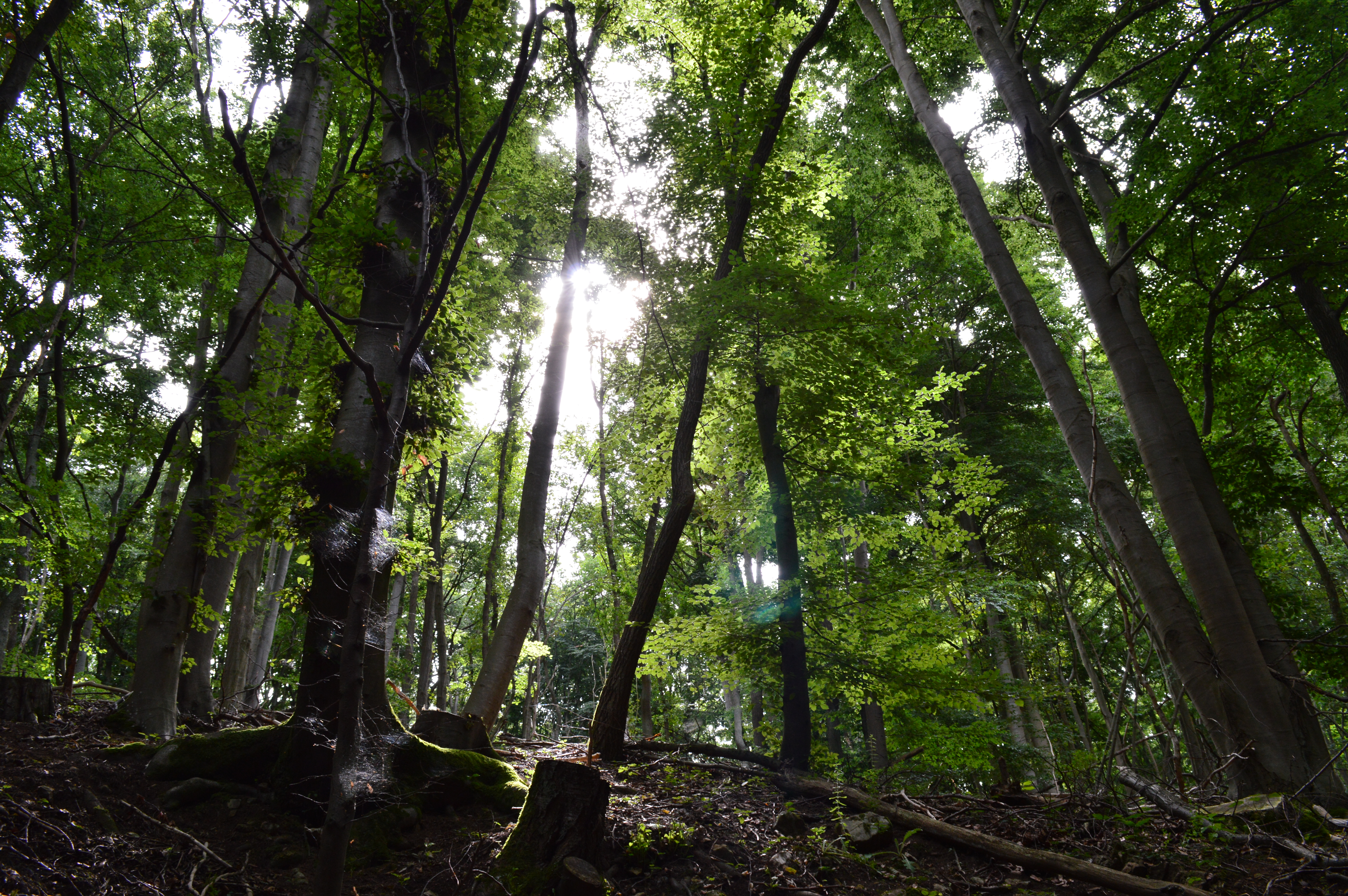

Münstereifel Forest (German: Münstereifeler Wald) is a densely wooded region in the northern part of the Eifel mountains in North Rhine-Westphalia, Germany. In the south, it borders the state of Rhineland-Palatinate. It has an area of 237 km² and an elevation between 200 and 500 m above sea level (NHN).

== Geography ==
The hills and woods of the Münstereifel Forest are situated in the county of Euskirchen around the town of Bad Münstereifel. The region is bounded in the west by the Limestone Eifel (Kalkeifel), in the south and east by the Ahr Hills, and in the north by the Zülpich Börde, where it forms the transition between the Eifel and the Lower Rhine Bay.

Among the hills of the Münstereifel Forest are the following:

- Michelsberg (586.1 m above NHN),
- Knippberg (537.3 m above NHN),
- Langer Kopf (530.4 m above NHN),
- Fanisberg (508 m above NHN),
- Bollscheider Kopf (474.1 m above NHN),
- Hirnberg (456.4 m above NHN),
- Stockert (433.9 m above NHN), on which the radio-telescope, Astropeiler Stockert, stands,
- Hähnchen (428.7 m above sea level (NHN)).

== Countryside ==
The region of the Münstereifel Forest is characterised by extensive beech woods, but also has stands of oak and spruce. 7.2% of the entire area is protected as a Special Area of Conservation with near-natural woodrush and woodruff-beech forest. A further 1.2% is designated as nature reserve. Numerous near-natural streams and ponds may be found in the Münstereifel Forest, including the Eschweiler Bach, which is a western tributary of the Erft.

The European wildcat probably occurs in the Münstereifel Forest. Species such as Bechstein's bat and need large areas of forest. In addition, the forest offers a habitat for the grey-headed woodpecker, black woodpecker, red kite, kingfisher and greater mouse-eared bat.
