= S5 0212+73 =

High redshift blazar located in the constellation Cassiopeia

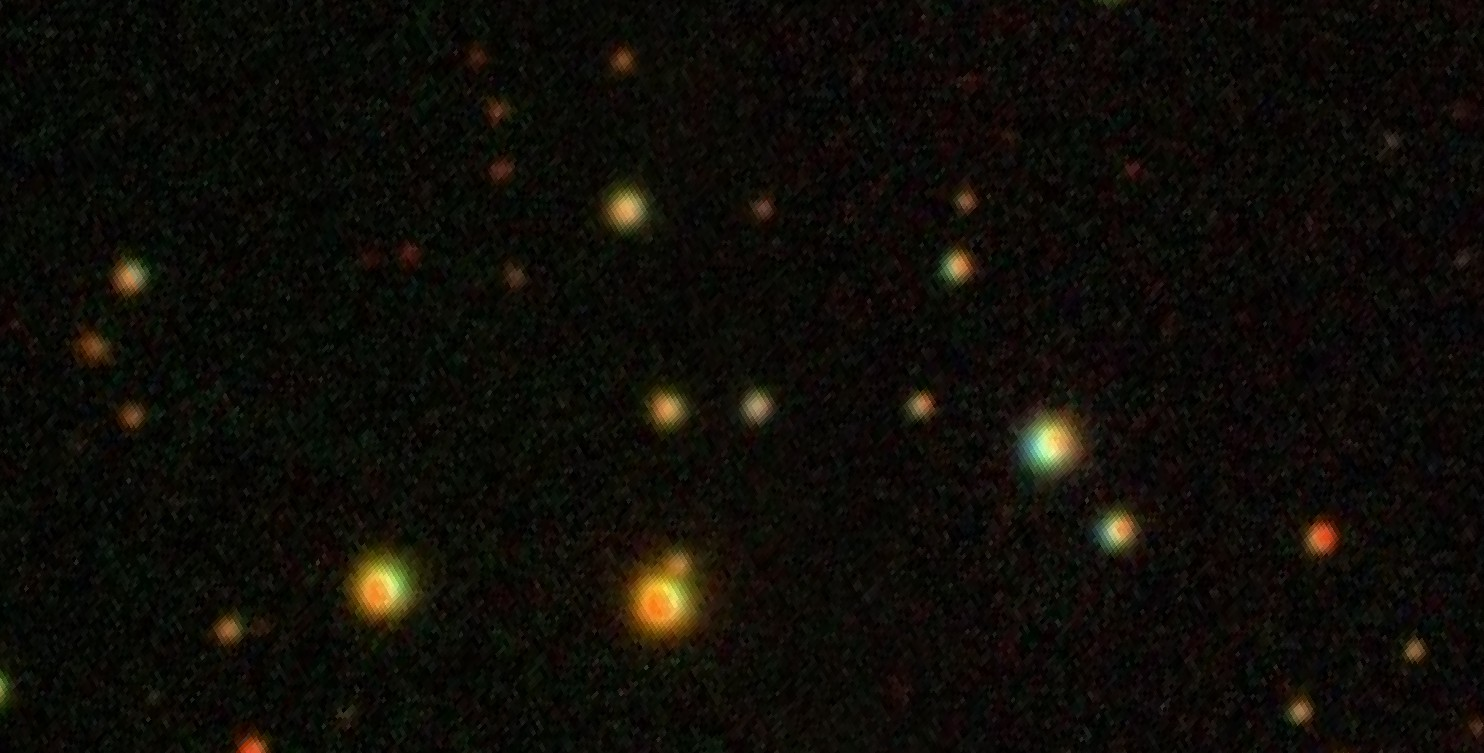
- The quasar S5 0212+73 taken with Sloan Digital Sky Survey.

Observation data (J2000.0 epoch)
- Constellation: Cassiopeia
- Right ascension: 02^{h} 17^{m} 30.813^{s}
- Declination: +73° 49′ 32.621″
- Redshift: 2.346200
- Heliocentric radial velocity: 703,373 km/s
- Distance: 10.522 Gly
- Apparent magnitude (V): 19.00

Characteristics
- Type: HPQ BL LAC

Other designations
- NVSS J021730+734932, 6C B021252.2+733537, RX J0217.5+7349, SWIFT J0218.0+7348

S5 0212+73 also known as QSO B0212+735, is a high redshift radio-loud blazar located at (z) 2.346. It lies in the constellation of Cassiopeia, 10.5 billion light-years away from Earth and was one of the six sources discovered in 1981 by astronomers from the Bonn-NRAO 5 GHz survey. The radio spectrum of the object is flat, thus classifying it a flat-spectrum radio quasar. It has also been referred to as a BL Lacertae object in literature.

== Description ==
Variable on the electromagnetic spectrum, S5 0212+73 is constantly active. It displayed a gamma-ray flare on June 26, 2024, where its average gamma-ray flux reached daily levels of 1.1 ± 0.2 × 10^{−6} photons cm^{−2} s^{-1,} about a factor of 35 upon detection by Fermi Gamma-ray Space Telescope. Subsequently, the object would later display a slight decrease in gamma-ray flux on July 1, 2024, where its levels reached (+1.59, -1.48) × 10^{−12} erg cm^{−2} s^{−1}.

The optical to ultraviolet peak of S5 0212+73 is considered narrowly defined because of increasing flux observed in its B-filter. This is mainly attributed to contamination of its continuum flux by a Lyman-alpha emission line. The object also displays an inverted spectrum detected at 6 and 2.8 centimeters (cm) since 1996 with modulation index increasing to 9.1% at 2.8 cm from 6.5% at 6 cm during long-term monitoring by Effelsburg 100-m Radio telescope.

The source of the object is compact. According to radio imaging by Very Long Baseline Interferometry (VLBI), it has a one-sided core-jet structure made up of a radio core, and three jet components, with some weaker radio emission located at 4 milliarcseconds away from the core at a position angle of 100°. First-epoch mapping failed to detect an extended structure, while polarization observations by VLBI found a bright core component located west and a radio jet extending south-east from the core. Additionally, there is a weaker component in the west by 15 milliarcseconds. Very Long Baseline Array (VLBA) mapping has shown the jet in S5 0212+73 is the longest observed, with an extent of 14 milliarcseconds. Two distinctive regions are found by the VLBA, mainly a weak extended jet region and an inner core-jet region.

S5 0212+73 displays superluminal motion. A later observation noted the inner jet component is separating from the core at an increasing rate from 1.0 to 1.5 milliarcseconds, with a proper motion of 0.09 ± 0.05 milliarcseconds per year. Both the core and jet show rotation measures, with the former having a negative measurement of -542 ± 55 rad m^{−2} while the former has a positive measurement of +119 ± 64 rad m^{−2}.

The magnetic field of the inner jet in S5 0212+73 is offset. When observed, it has an offset angle of 30° and suggested as roughly parallel to the jet's direction northwest, should a smooth line be drawn through the components. Evidence would show the components located in the inner and outer regions of the object have flux density variations marginally consistent to one another, with no observed epoch changes. Other than that, there is an observed steepening of its spectral index as the distance increases from the jet.
