= Arloff Castle =

- Burg Arloff
- Arloff
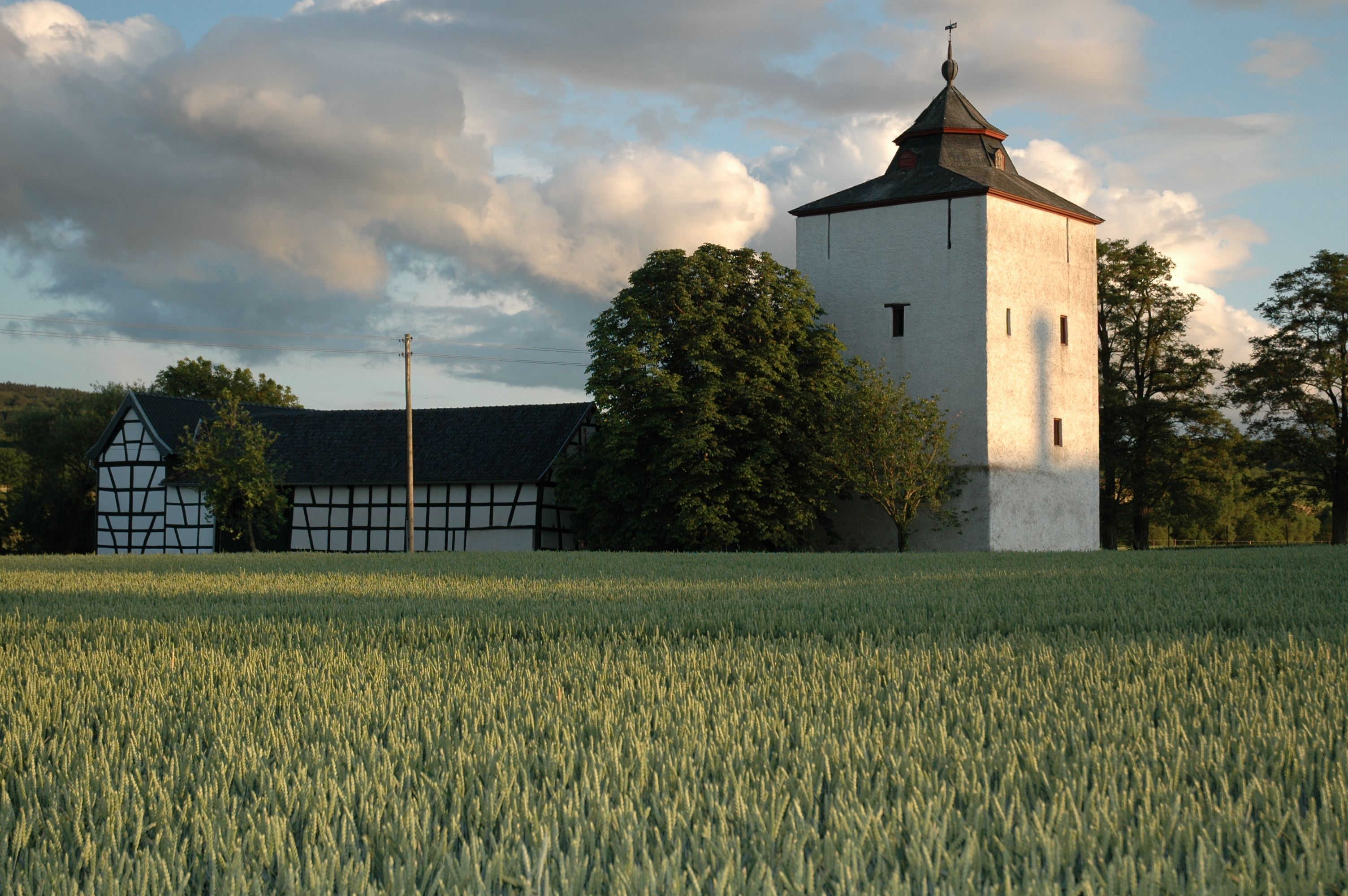
- Tower house and outbuilding of Arloff Castle seen from the North

Site information
- Type: lowland castle
- Code: DE-NW
- Condition: Considerable elements survive

Location
- Coordinates: 50°35′33″N 6°47′14″E
- Height: 225 m above sea level (NHN)

Site history
- Built: 12th/13th century
- Materials: rubble stone

Arloff Castle (German: Burg Arloff) is on the river Erft in the village of Arloff, part of the borough of Bad Münstereifel in the county of Euskirchen, in the German state of North Rhine-Westphalia.

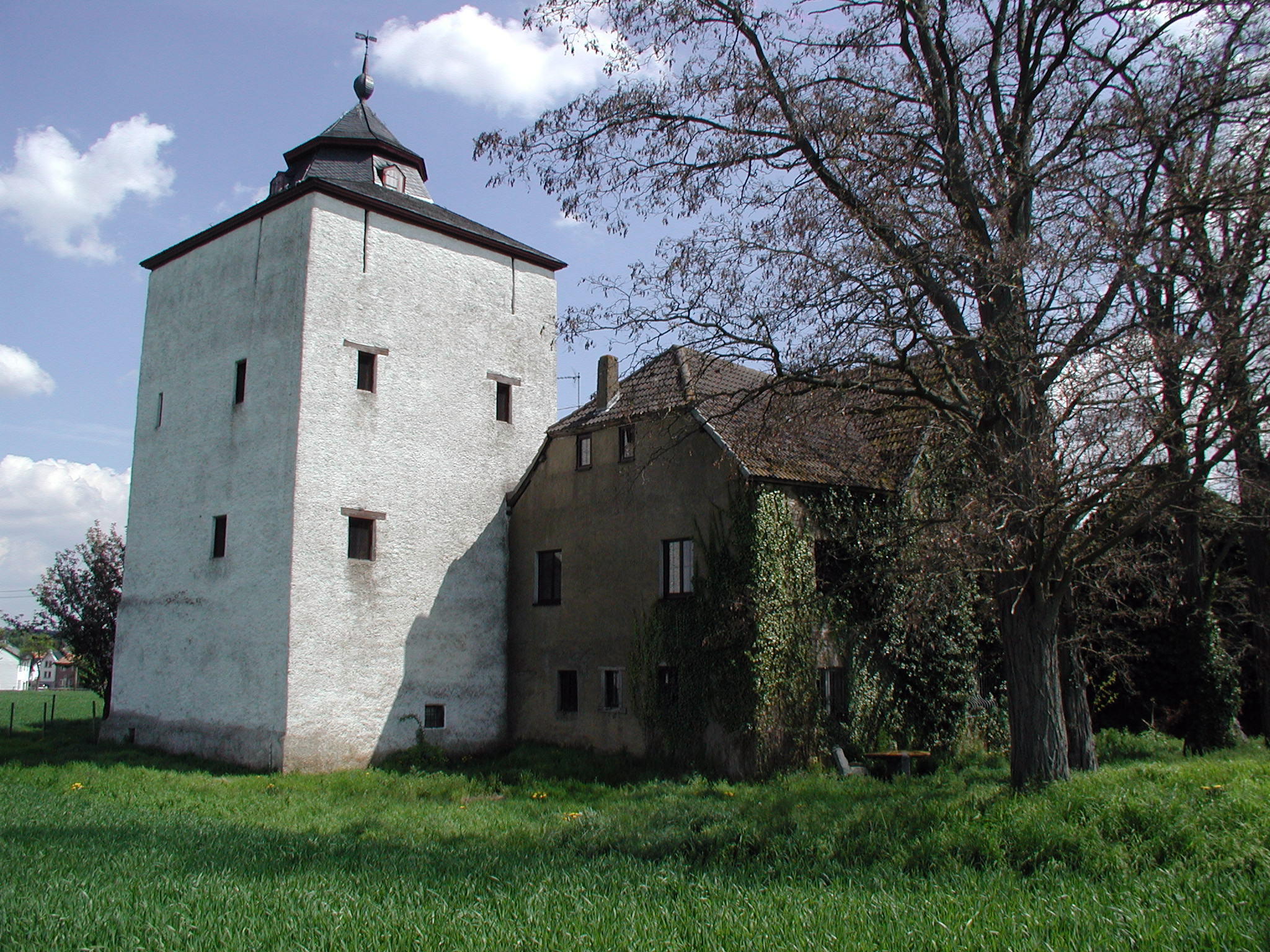
Tower house and tenant's house

The buildings of the former water castle of Arloff, which today look somewhat ordinary by the River Erft, belong to the typologically important castles of the Rhineland, because such a well preserved example of a purpose-built fortification from the Early Gothic period is rare.

It was originally surrounded by moats which were fed by the Erft. In the Middle Ages it was of strategic importance due to its location, because it was situated on the border between the Electorate of Cologne and the County of Jülich.

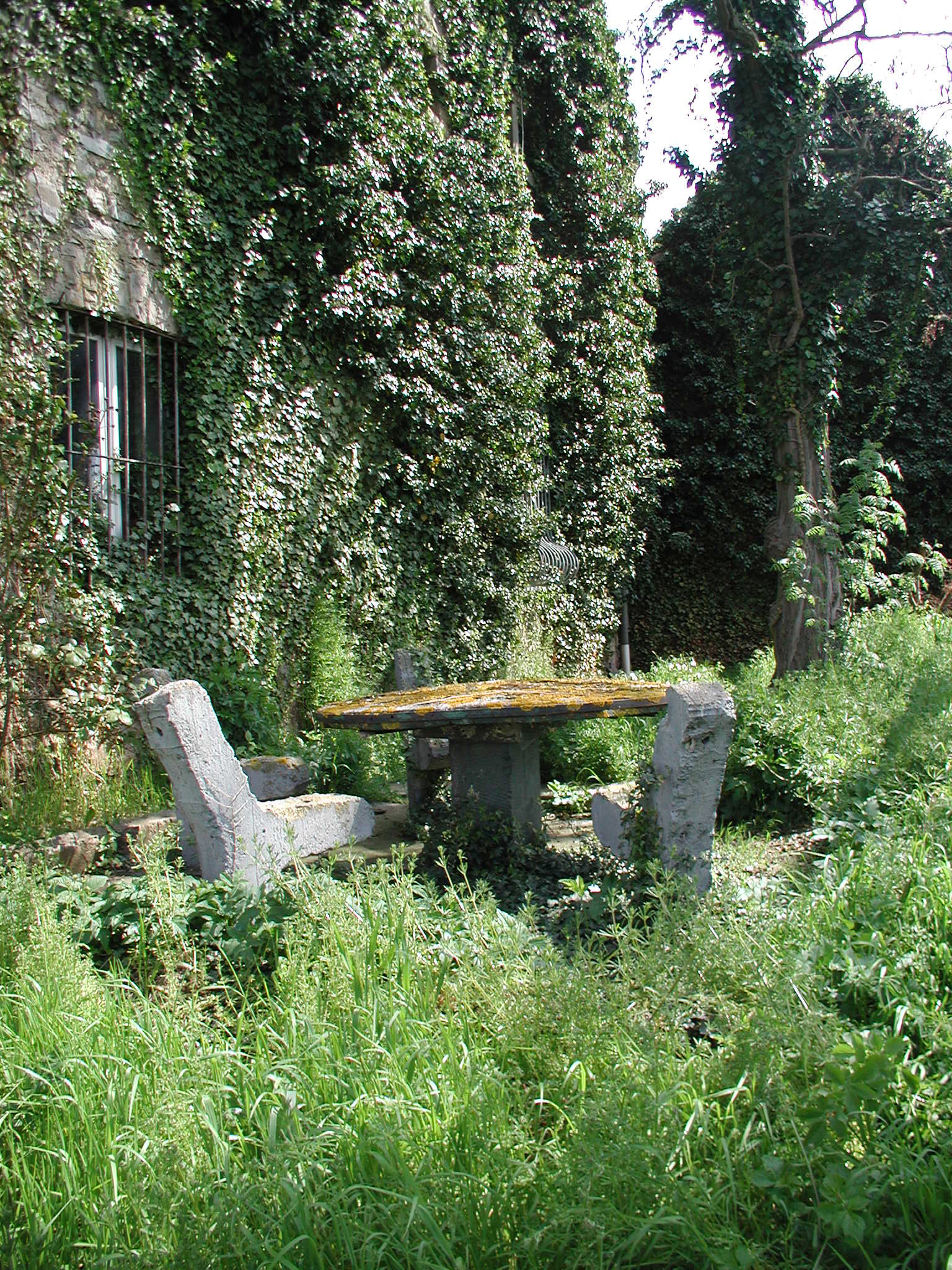
Castle garden

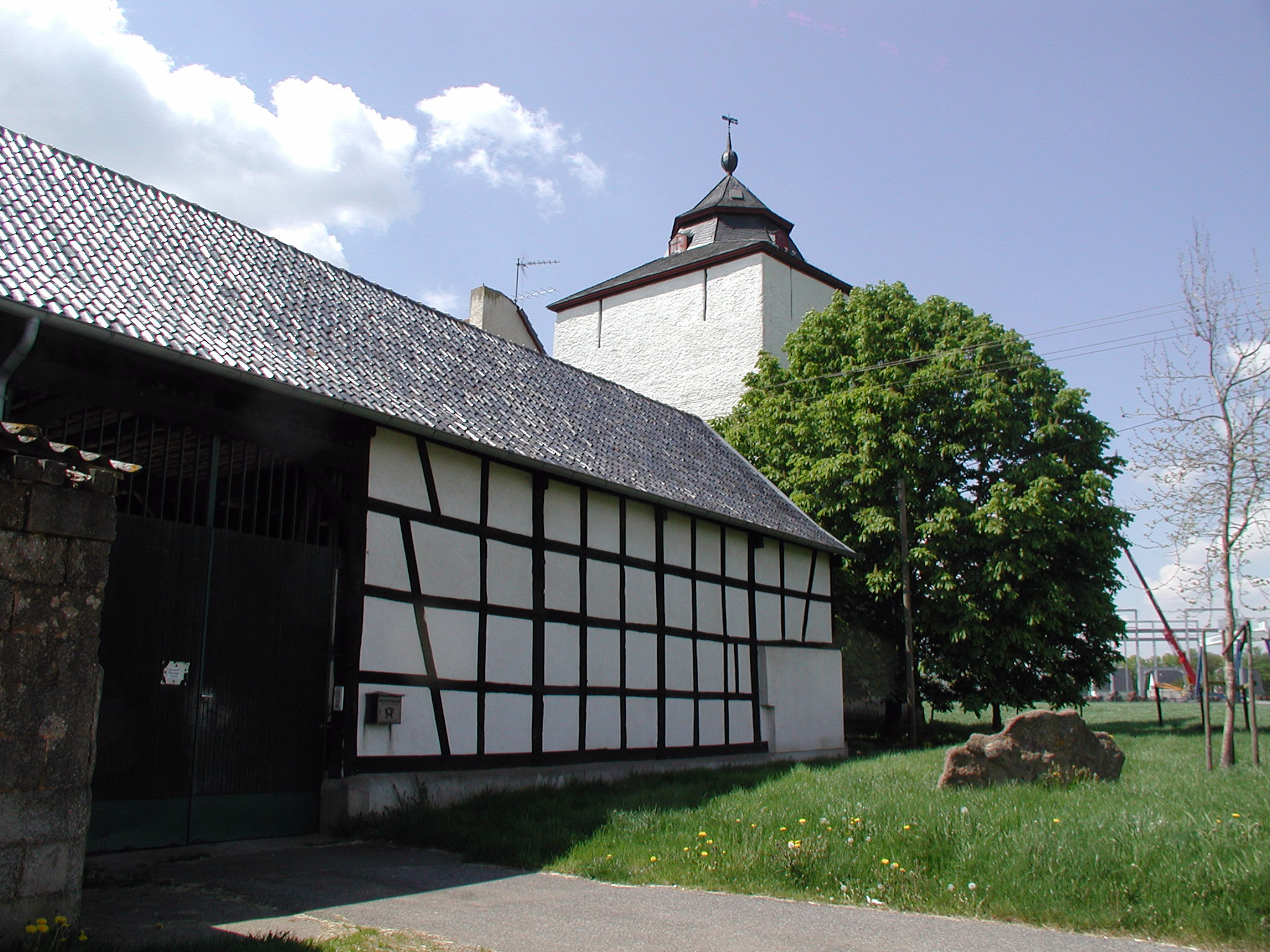
Present castle site

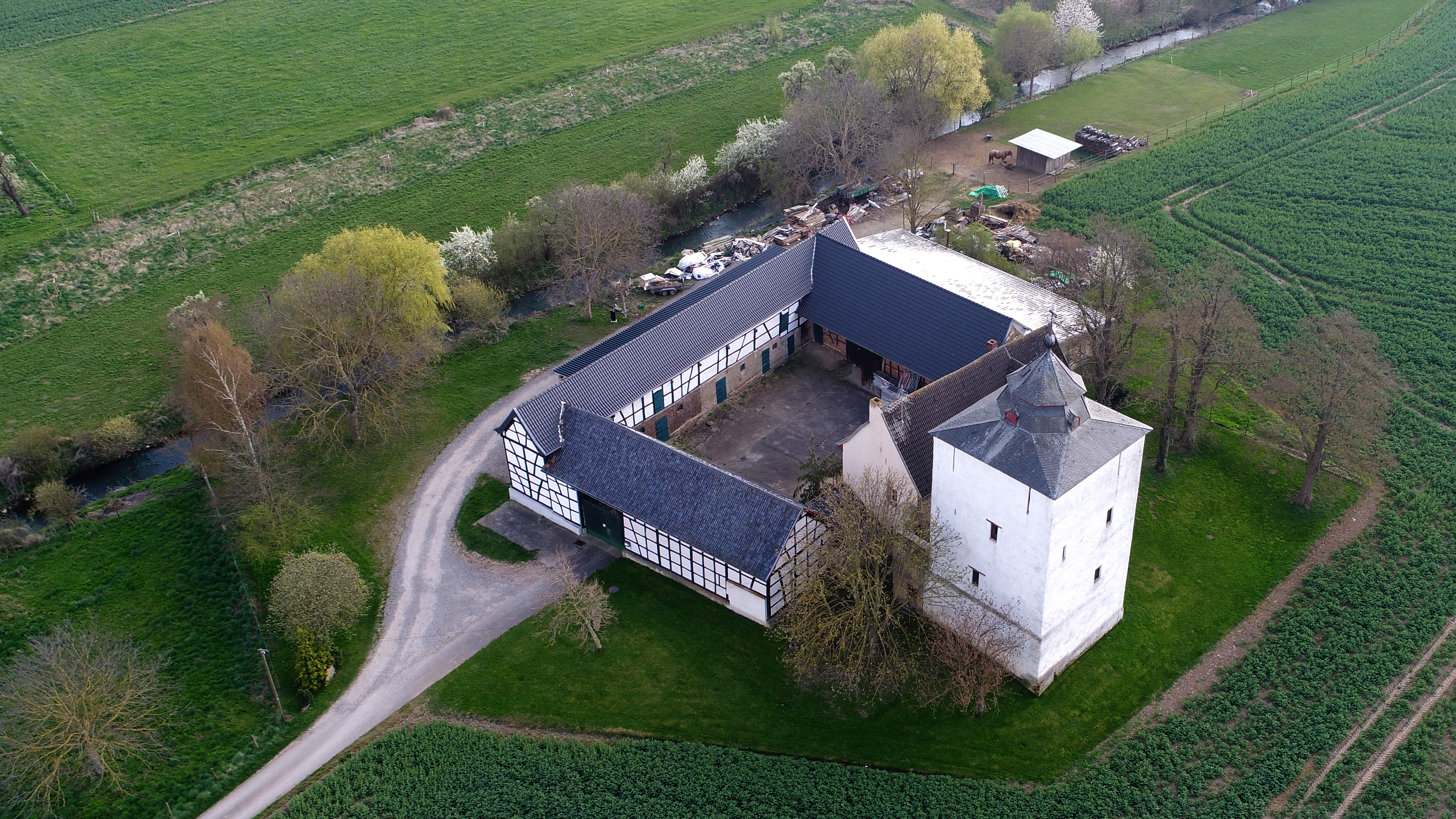
Bird's-eye view

== History ==
Arloff Castle is first recorded in 1278. The castle and its associated estates belonged at that time to Gerlach of Dollendorf, whose family, the "nobles of Dollendorf", resided at their family seat of Dollendorf-Schloßthal Castle near Blankenheim from 893 to the mid-15th century. At that time the Dollendorfs were one of the oldest and richest noble houses in the region. Gerlach, whose estate in Arloff in 1278 was enfeoffed to him by the Archbishop of Cologne, Siegfried, had already been forced to do likewise with the castle and its estates belonging to the Dollendorfs in the neighbouring village of Kirspenich.

The balance of power changed ten years later, when the Jülichs stood on the side of the victors against "Siegfried" in the Battle of Worringen (1288). The Count of Jülich, who was one of the victorious allies, succeeded him as liege but had little interest in the small castle. In order to prevent disputes over the castle, its owner was appointed to the council (Landtag) of both principalities. This compromise was sustainable for the next 500 years.

In the 15th and 16th centuries, the lords of Mirbach were the owners of Arloff Castle; they were succeeded in the 17th century by the von Friemersdorfs. In 1865, Werner Dietrich of Friemersdorf, called Pützfeld, sold his allodial knight's seat, along with its mill and appurtenances (Appertinentien) to Philip William of Mockel, Mayor of Cologne. He had an existing dwelling converted into a tenant's house; he himself owned Arloff Castle until 1712.
