= Stockert (hill) =

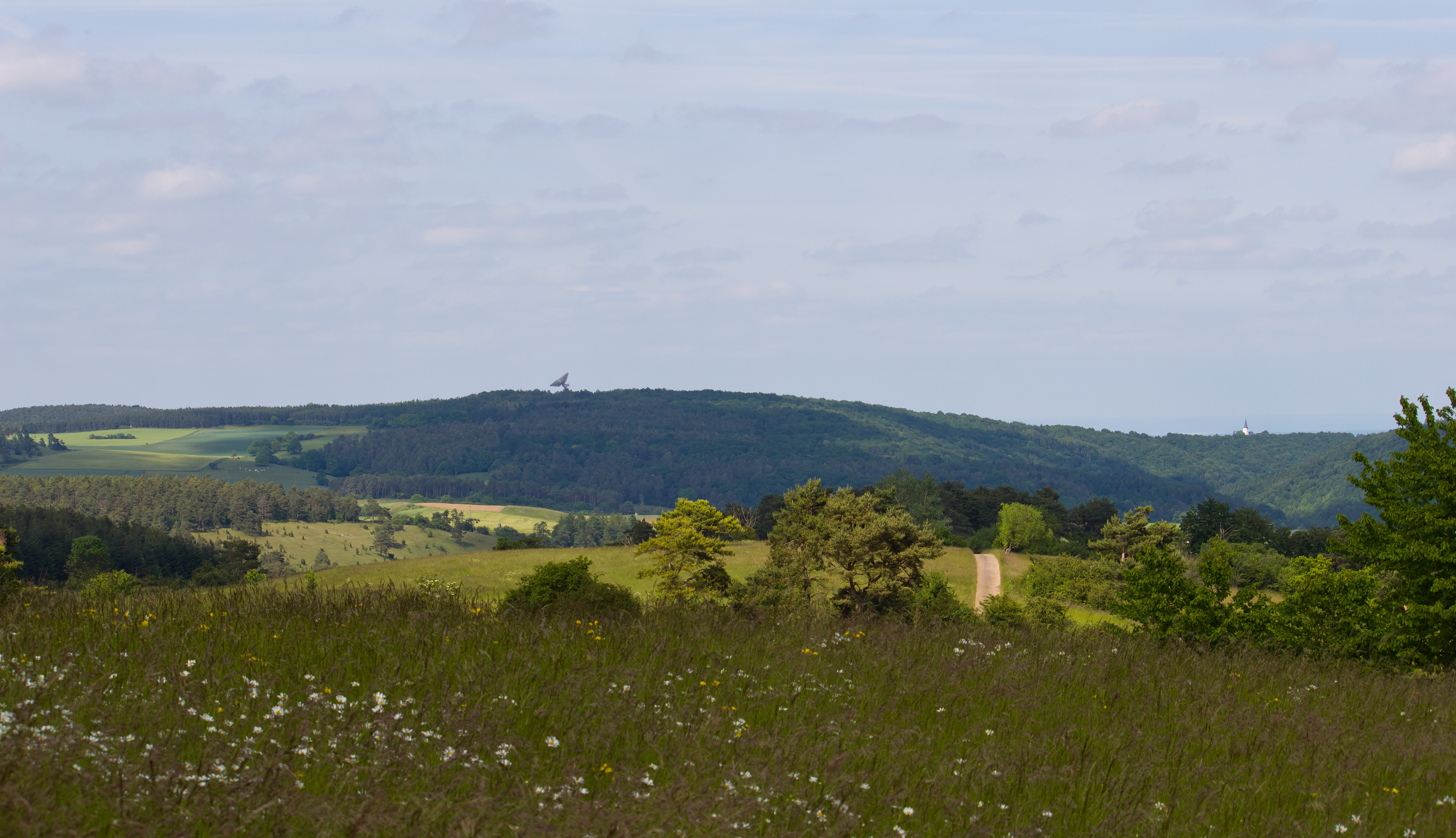
- View of the Stockert from Jakob-Kneip Berg

Highest point
- Elevation: 433.9 m above sea level (NHN) (1,424 ft)
- Coordinates: 50°34′9.8″N 6°43′18.2″E

Geography
- Location within North Rhine-Westphalia
- Location: Between Eschweiler and Holzheim; Münstereifel Forest, North Rhine-Westphalia (Germany)
- Parent range: Eifel

The Stockert is a 435-metre-high hill which rises between Eschweiler and Holzheim in the district of Euskirchen in the borough of Bad Münstereifel, in the Eifel mountains of Germany, and west of the city of Bonn.

== Geography ==
The Stockert rises in the west of the Münstereifel Forest. Its summit lies 1.4 kilometres west-southwest of Eschweiler, a sub-district of Bad Münstereifel, 1.8 kilometres east of Holzheim and 1.8 kilometres (each as the crow flies) south of Weiler am Berge, both of which belong to the borough of Mechernich; the boundary between the two municipal boroughs runs over its summit. A section of the Eschweiler Bach stream runs southeast of the mountain before flowing into the Erft about 3 river kilometres further east in Bad Münstereifel. The hill is partly forested, but on the summit around the radio telescope, it is treeless. Its upper northern and western slopes are used for agriculture.

== Leisure and access ==
The Landesstraßen (country roads) nos. 165 (Nöthen-Holzheim) and 499 (Holzheim-Weiler am Berge) run pass the hill roughly to the southwest and west. From the latter, the Kreisstraße 45 branches off in Weiler am Berge, heading east-southeast to Eschweiler. From the K 45, a track branches off to the west of Eschweiler, leading to the summit area. For example, starting from these roads, the hill can be hiked on forest trails and footpaths. On the north and east flank of the Stockert lies the golf course of the Bad Münstereifel-Stockert Golf Club.

== Radio telescope site ==
At the summit of the hill is the Stockert Radio Telescope, a historical monument which is now open to the public.
