= Alte Burg (Bad Münstereifel) =

Castle in Germany

- Alte Burg im Quecken, Alte Burg "am Quecken"
- Bad Münstereifel
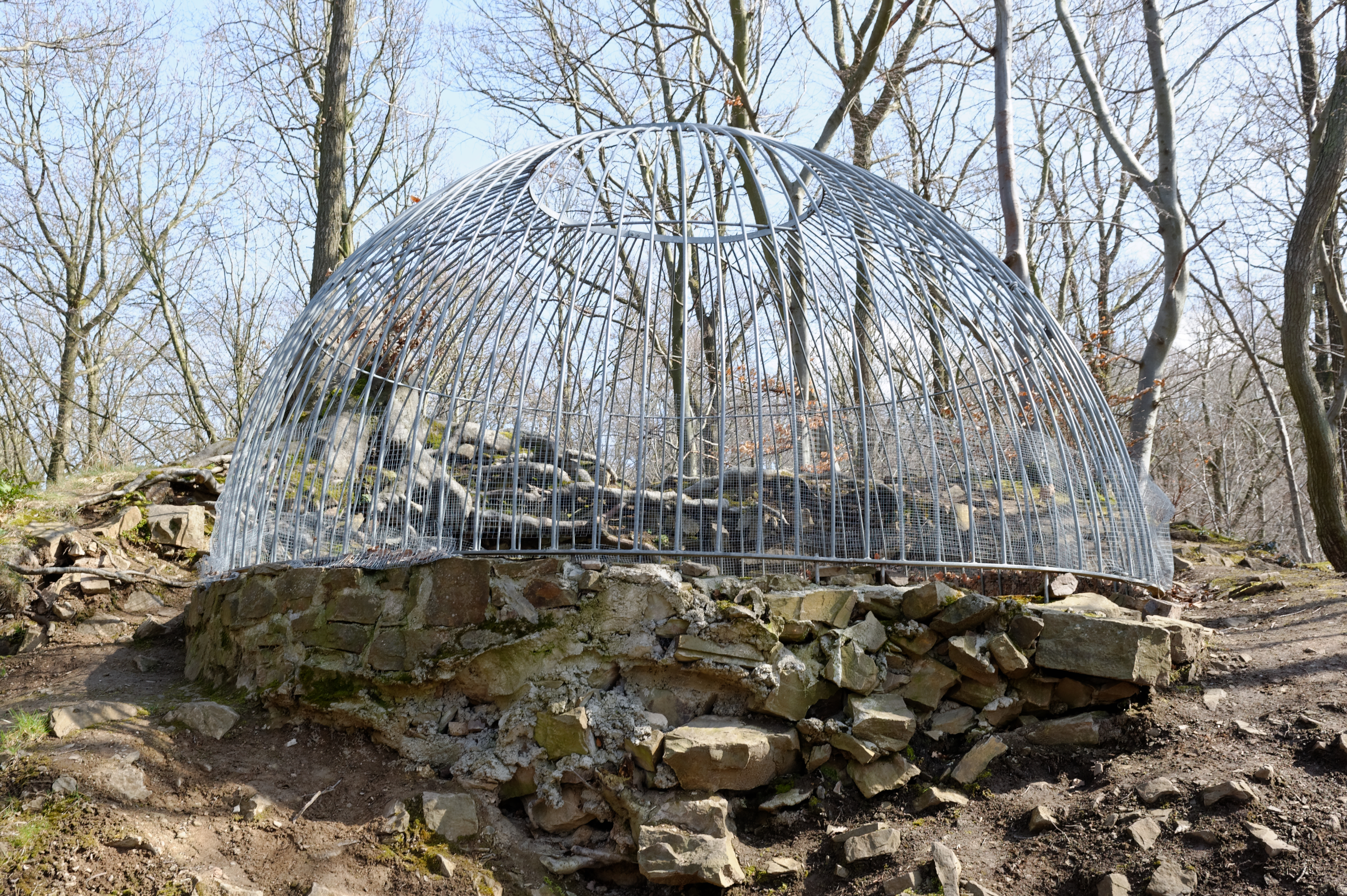

Site information
- Type: hill castle, spur castle
- Code: DE-NW
- Condition: remains of foundations

Location
- Coordinates: 50°33′31″N 6°46′10″E
- Height: 363 m above sea level (NN)

Site history
- Built: 9th century
- Materials: rubble stone

The Alte Burg (also Alte Burg im Quecken or Alte Burg "am Quecken") in Bad Münstereifel, Germany, is a circular rampart that is the remains of a fortification from the Carolingian period. The refuge castle acted as a place of retreat for the local population and as protection for the daughter monastery of Prüm Abbey. The defences dating to the 9th century have been designated as a protected monument. The castle site lies within the county of Euskirchen in the state of North Rhine-Westphalia.

The spur castle site lies northeast of the town centre on a hill spur, the second Quecken, above the Erft valley east of the B 51 federal highway at a height of 315 to 363 metres (1,033 to 1,191 ft). It is 300 metres (980 ft) long and 80 metres (260 ft) wide, excluding the outworks. There were at least two periods of construction. In the northeast is a motte.

In the highest section of the site, the rubble stone foundation of a round tower has survived. In the 19th century a silver coin bearing the image of Louis the Pious is supposed to have been found here; it has not survived. In 1972 parts of the site were archaeologically investigated. During the excavations shards of pottery from the 9th century with decorations (Rollrädchenverzierung) were discovered.

== Literature ==
- Karl Hürten: Die wiedergefundene ‚Alte Burg‘ bei Münstereifel. In: Rheinische Geschichtsblätter. Zeitschrift für Geschichte, Sprache und Altertümer des Mittel- und Niederrheins, Vol. 9. Bonn, 1909 (Online publication)
- Felix Hauptmann: Die Alte Burg bei Münstereifel. In: Rheinische Geschichtsblätter. Zeitschrift für Geschichte, Sprache und Altertümer des Mittel- und Niederrheins, Vol. 8. Bonn, 1905 (Online publication)
