= Roman dodecahedron =

Small copper alloy object

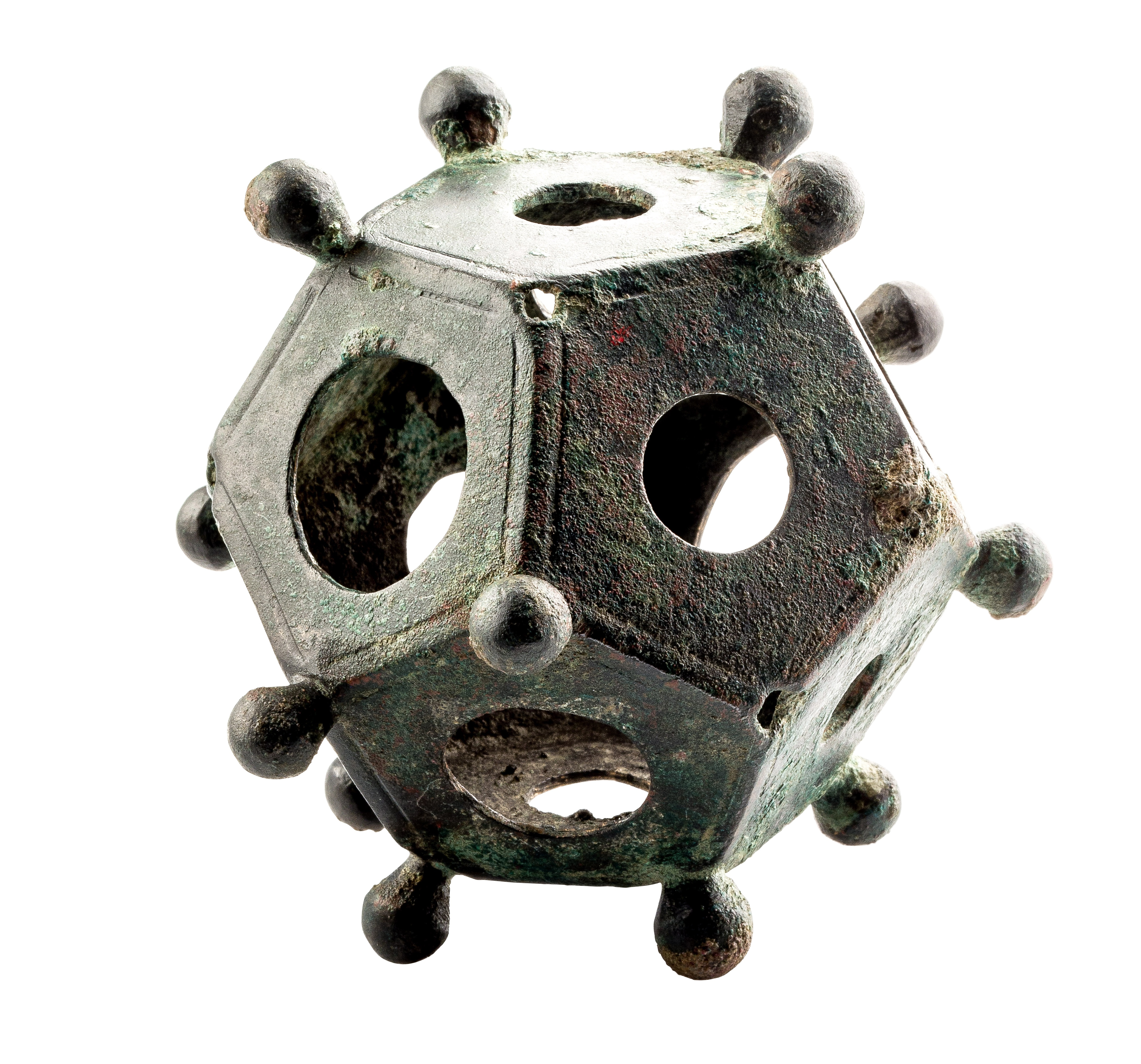
Roman bronze dodecahedron found in Tongeren; Gallo-Roman Museum, Tongeren

A Roman dodecahedron or Gallo-Roman dodecahedron is a type of small hollow object made of copper alloy that has been cast into a regular dodecahedral shape with twelve flat pentagonal faces. Each face has a circular hole of varying diameter in the middle, the holes connecting to the hollow center, and each corner has a protruding knob. They rarely show signs of wear and do not have any inscribed numbers or letters.

Since the first known example was recorded in 1739, over one hundred such objects have been discovered, dating from the 2nd to the 4th centuries AD. Their purpose or meaning has been long debated but remains unknown.

== Description ==
Roman dodecahedra are cast in metal, usually a copper alloy. They are in the shape of regular dodecahedra, with the addition of a small metal ball at each vertex; each face has a circular hole in the centre. The dodecahedra vary in size from 4–11 cm (1.6–4.3 inches); the holes in their faces have diameters ranging from 6–40 mm (0.24–1.57 inches). The lightest known example weighs 35 g (1.2 ounces); the heaviest 1 kg (2.2 pounds).

The dodecahedra are cast using the lost wax technique. The interior surfaces are left unfinished, though the outsides are well-finished and were probably polished. Most are decorated with circles, lines, and dots, but no letters or numbers are known to be marked on any of the objects. The most common decorative scheme is for two or three concentric circles to be inscribed around the holes.

The metal balls on the vertices of the dodecahedra are not perfectly regular, suggesting that they were made without the use of a mould. They are generally soldered to the body of the dodecahedron, though the example from Carmarthen in the collection of the Society of Antiquaries of London was cast as a single piece, including the balls. One example, found in London, has clusters of three balls at each corner rather than just one.

== Discoveries ==
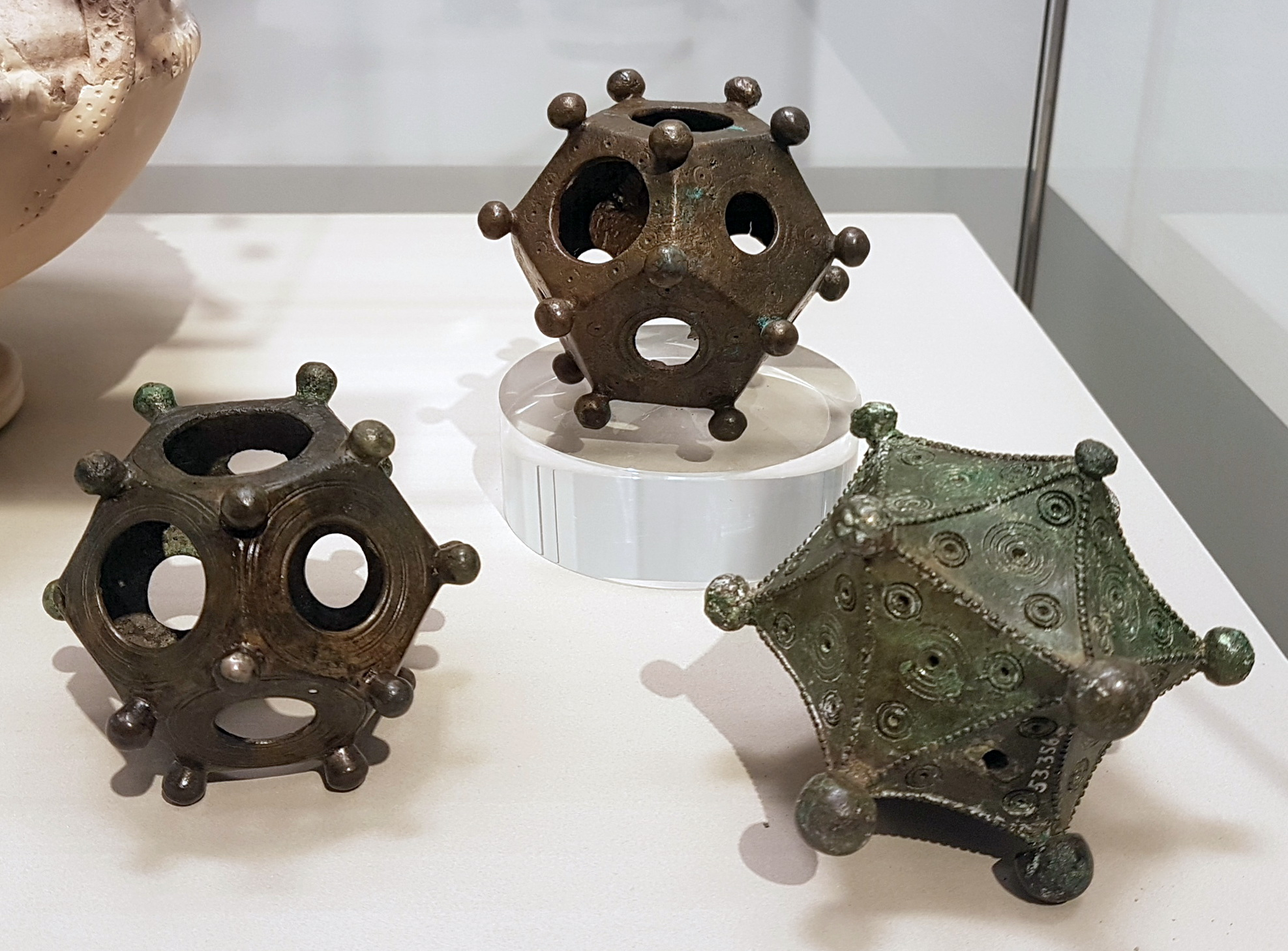
Two dodecahedra and an icosahedron on display in the Rheinisches Landesmuseum Bonn, Germany

The first Roman dodecahedron to be recorded was presented to the Society of Antiquaries of London on 28 June 1739 and was reported to have been found in a field in Aston, Hertfordshire, England. Since then, about 130 similar objects have been found in Austria, Belgium, France, Germany, Hungary, Luxembourg, the Netherlands, Switzerland, and the United Kingdom, but not in the Roman heartland in Italy. The southeasternmost findspot for a dodecahedron is in Deonica, Serbia. Fragments of two dodecahedra discovered in modern Slovakia, near Chotín and Hurbanovo, were found outside of the boundaries of the Roman empire.

In 2023, a dodecahedron in excellent condition was found by amateur archeologists in the small village of Norton Disney in Lincolnshire, UK, bringing the total to 33 such objects found on the territory of Roman Britain. It was on display at the Lincoln Museum, Lincolnshire, until October 2024.

The archaeological context in which dodecahedra have been found is often uncertain. Where it is known, the context is commonly military or funerary; other discoveries have been in baths, a theatre, a coin hoard, and on a riverbed. They were mostly made in Gaul between the second and fourth centuries AD. One dodecahedron was found in a tomb alongside a bone object that might have been a kind of handle; however, it was in too poor a condition to excavate and preserve.

== Purpose ==
The purpose of Roman dodecahedra has been much debated: more than fifty possible explanations have been published. Identifying their purpose with certainty is made more difficult as no mention of dodecahedra has been found in contemporary accounts or pictures. Speculative uses include as a survey instrument for estimating distances to (or sizes of) distant objects, though this is questioned, as there are no markings to indicate that they would be a mathematical instrument; as spool knitting devices for making gloves (though the earliest known reference to spool knitting is from 1535, and this would neither explain the use of bronze, nor the apparently similar icosahedron, which is missing the holes necessary for spool knitting); or as part of a child's toy.

Scholars discussing the purpose of the objects almost always note the philosophical significance of the dodecahedron in classical thought, which is often believed to have a ritual purpose. It has been suggested that they might have been fortune-telling devices. This is based on the fact that most of the examples have been found at Gallo-Roman sites. Several dodecahedra were found in coin hoards, suggesting either that their owners considered them valuable objects, or that their use was connected with coins—as, for example, for easily checking that coins fit a certain diameter and were not clipped. It has also been suggested that they might have been an object to test the skill of a metalsmith, perhaps as part of a portfolio to demonstrate their capabilities to customers or as a way to qualify for a certain status in a Roman guild. This speculation is based on the historic cost of bronze and the level of skill necessary to cast such an object. Some 19th-century antiquarians speculated that they might be weapons, such as the head of a mace or a metal bullet, but other scholars have suggested that the dodecahedra are too light to make an effective weapon.

== Similar objects ==
A Roman icosahedron has also been discovered, after having long been misclassified as a dodecahedron. It was excavated near Arloff in Germany and is on display in the Rheinisches Landesmuseum in Bonn. Like the dodecahedra, the Arloff icosahedron is a hollow bronze object, with spheres on each corner. Two of its opposite faces have holes in them. Unlike the dodecahedra, the Arloff icosahedron has three of its knobs, arranged around a single face, larger than the others, giving it a more obvious orientation: if the three large knobs are treated as the object's feet, it would put the larger hole at the top. In 2009, metal detectorists in France reported the discovery of an object at Saint-Trivier-de-Courtes, similar to the Roman dodecahedra but spherical, with triangular and pentagonal holes. A solid silver Roman dodecahedron was discovered in Geneva in 1982; each face is inscribed with the name of one of the signs of the zodiac.

Smaller dodecahedra with the same features (holes and knobs) and made from gold have been found in Southeast Asia, along the Maritime Silk Road, and the earliest items appear to be from the Roman epoch. Examples include those uncovered in Óc Eo, Vietnam, by Louis Malleret, who concluded that the objects represented the influence of Mediterranean trade on the Funan economy. Similar gold dodecahedra are known from Burma, China, India, and Thailand. Parallels have also been drawn to Scottish carved stone balls, Gallo-Roman sceptre heads from Sturton by Stow and Suffolk, and a dodecahedron from Ptolemaic Egypt.
