= Arloff =

- Stadtteil of Bad Münstereifel
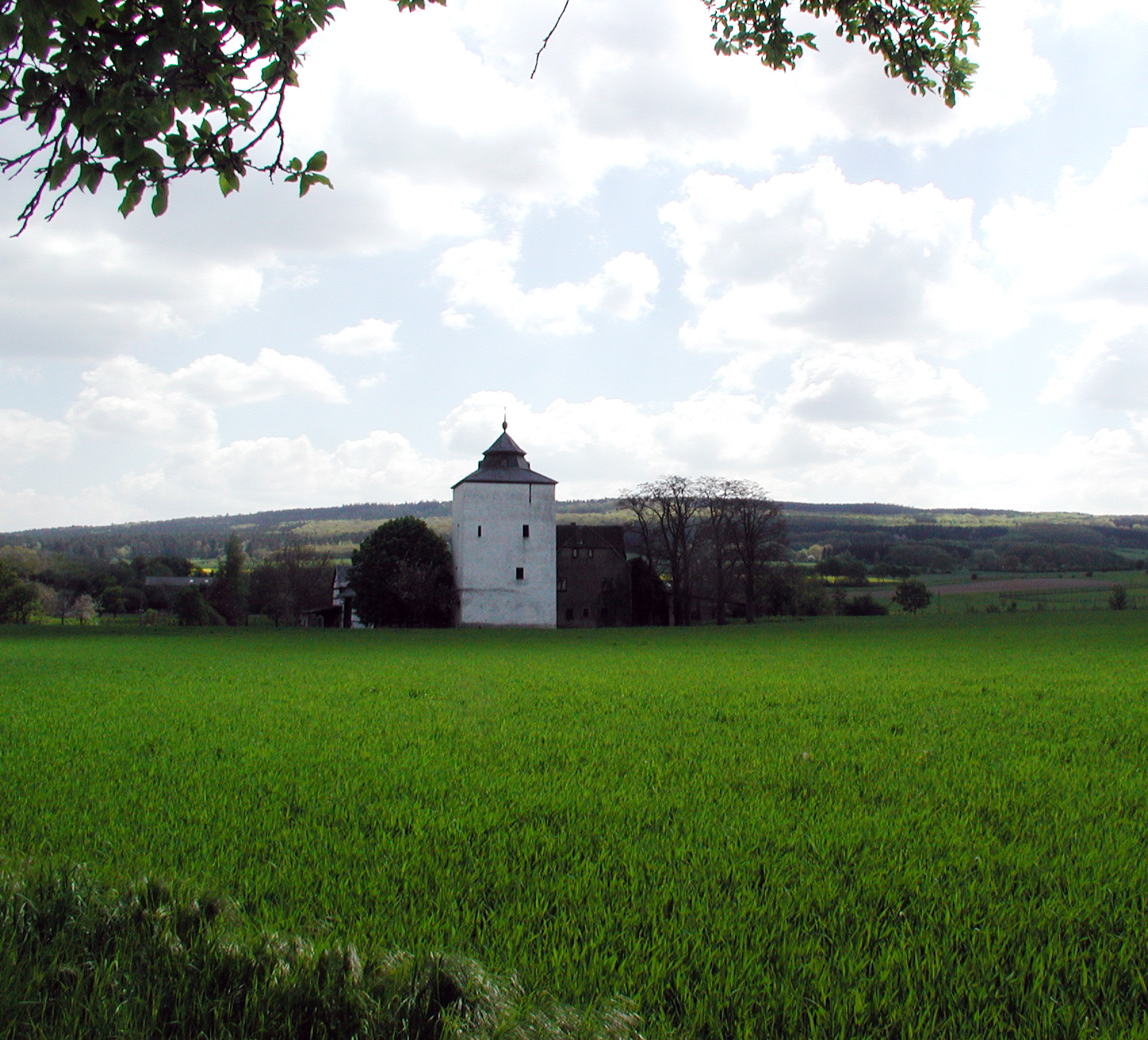
- Arloff Castle in the Erft valley
- Interactive map of Arloff
- Location within Germany Location within North Rhine-Westphalia
- Coordinates: 50°35′40″N 6°47′30″E
- Country: Germany
- State: North Rhine-Westphalia
- Town: Bad Münstereifel

Area
  - Total: 9.98 km^{2} (3.85 sq mi)
- Elevation: 221 m (725 ft)

Population (2020-12-31)
  - Total: 1,064
  - Density: 107/km^{2} (276/sq mi)
- Time zone: UTC+01:00 (CET)
  - Summer (DST): UTC+02:00 (CEST)
- Postal codes: 53902
- Dialling codes: 02253

Arloff is a village in the borough of Bad Münstereifel in the district of Euskirchen in the German state of North Rhine-Westphalia.

Arloff Castle is a well preserved fortified building from the early Gothic period.

== Location ==
Arloff lies in the Voreifel between Euskirchen and the old town of Bad Münstereifel on the boundary between the Zülpich Börde lowlands and the Eifel mountains.

The river Erft flows through the village. The Erft and the Landesstraße 194 are crossed by local roads that run along the edge of the Eifel. The urban area of Arloff and the village to the north, Kirspenich, merge here in the wide valley of the Erft.

== Archeology ==
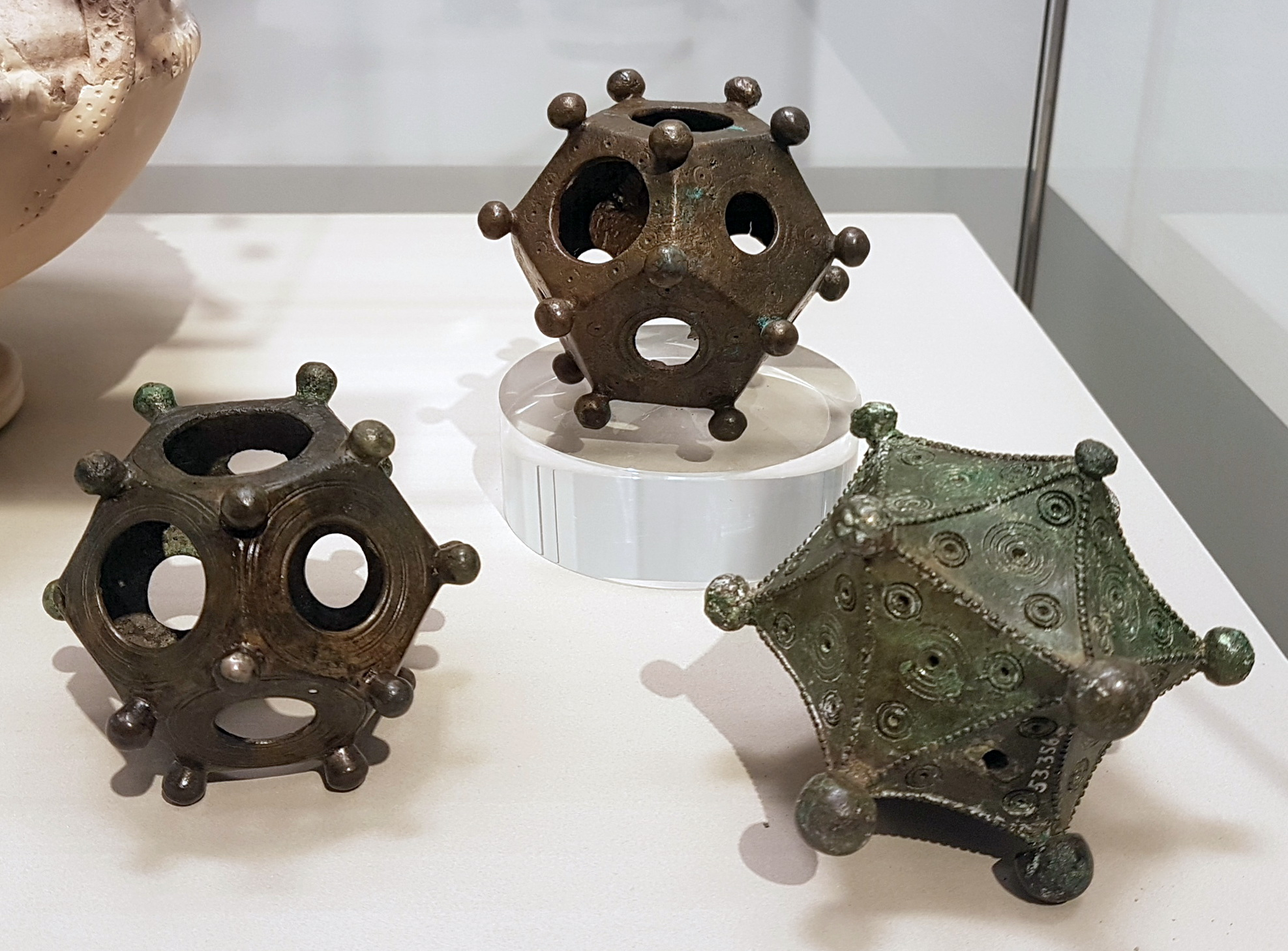
The Arloff icosahedron (front right) in the Rhenish State Museum, Bonn

A Roman icosahedron was found near Arloff. It was at first misclassified as a dodecahedron. It is on display in the Rheinisches Landesmuseum.

== Literature /Sources ==
- Eifelführer 2006. 39th edn. Rheinländischer Eifelverein, Düren, 2006, ISBN 3-921805-39-2.
- Gabriele Harzheim: Historische Wege in der Eifel, zu Fuß und per Rad. J. P. Bachem Verlag, Cologne, 2004, ISBN 3-7616-1805-0.
- Harald Herzog, Klaus Ring: „Mauern, Türme und Ruinen“. Ein Wanderführer zu Burgen und Schlössern im Kreis Euskirchen. Published by the Verein der Geschichts- und Heimatfreunde des Kreises Euskirchen, Rheinland Verlag, Cologne, 1990, ISBN 3-7929-1153-2.
- Dirk Holtermann, Harald Herzog: Die Euskirchener Burgenrunde. Radeln zwischen Erft und Eifel. Walter Rau Verlag, Düsseldorf, 2000, ISBN 3-7919-0750-6.
