= Wilhelm Mohr (journalist) =

German journalist and author (1838–1888)

Wilhelm Mohr (3 December 1838 in Münstereifel - 25 November 1888 in Silesia) was a German journalist and employee of the Kölnische Zeitung.

== Biography ==
Wilhelm Mohr first studied theology in Bonn. In 1863, he received a doctorate on Sophocles. In 1864 he found a job as a teacher at the Marzellengymnasium in Cologne. From 1869 to 1871 he worked as a journalist in Rome and Florence. Then from 1874 to 1875 he also worked as a journalist in Spain.

In August 1876 he wrote the letters of a patron saint to the Kölnische Zeitung while in Bayreuth.

In 1883 Wilhelm Mohr visited America to attend the opening of the Northern Pacific Railway as a representative of the Kölnische Zeitung, then stayed in Italy for another year (Turin exhibition in 1884).

== Works ==
- The founding of music. An epilogue to the laying of the foundation stone in Baireuther. Cologne 1872.
- Eighteen months in Spain. Cologne 1876.
- Richard Wagner and the artwork of the future in the light of the Baireuther performance. Cologne 1876.
- With a return ticket to the Pacific Ocean. Stuttgart 1884.
- Antwerp. The general exhibition in letters to the Kölnische Zeitung. Cologne 1885.
