= Stockert Radio Telescope =

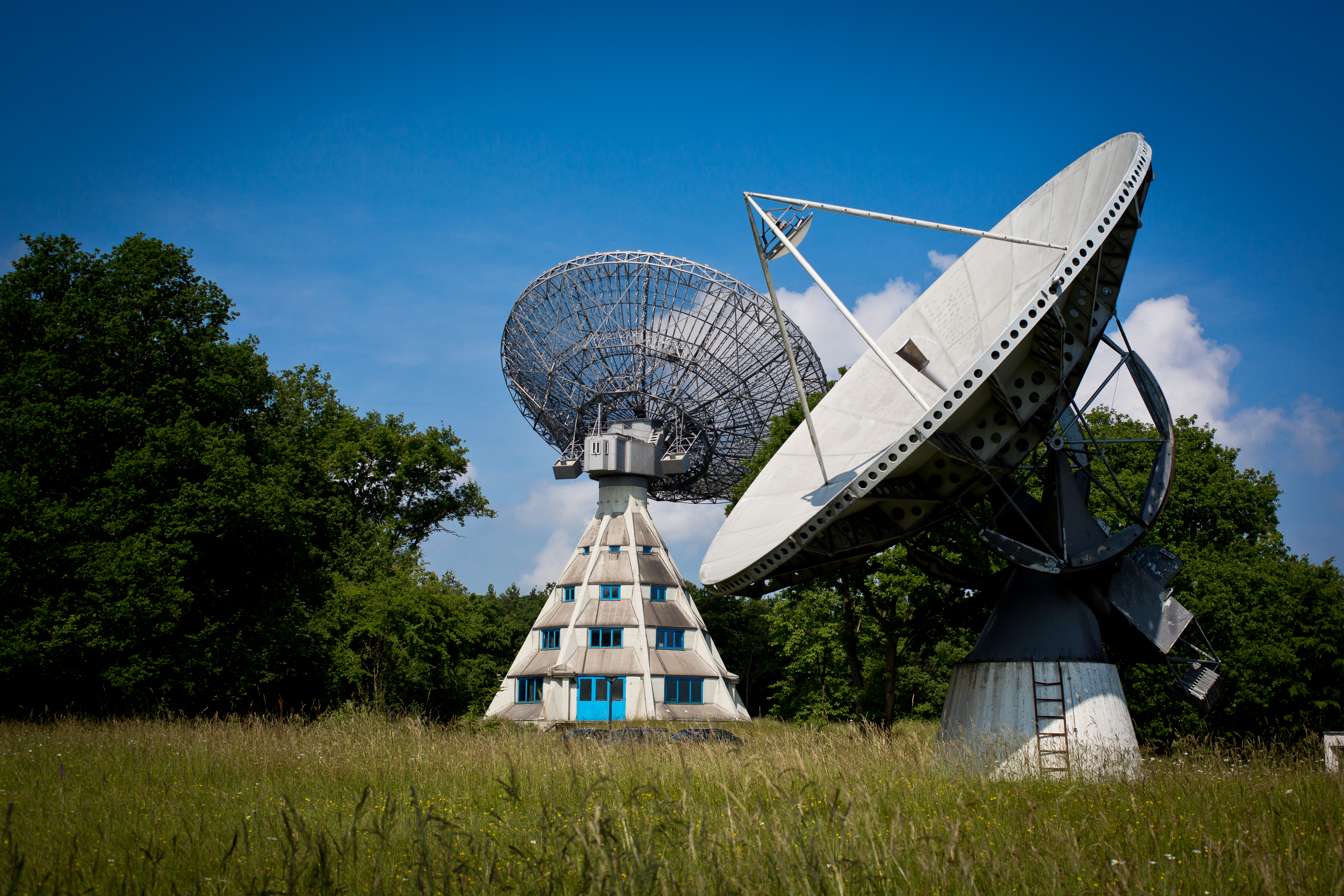
- The "Astropeiler" (rear) on the Stockert hill
- Alternative names: Astropeiler Stockert
- Location: Bad Münstereifel, North Rhine-Westphalia, Germany
- Coordinates: 50°34.2′N 6°43.4′E
- Altitude: 435 m (1,427 ft)
- Established: 1956
- Closed: 1995, re-opened 2010
- Website: http://www.astropeiler.de

Telescopes
- "Astropeiler" radio telescope: parabolic reflector, 25 m aperture
- radio telescope: parabolic reflector, 10 m aperture
- radio interferometer: two parabolic reflectors, 1.2 m aperture
- Related media on Commons

The Stockert Radio Telescope is a historical radio telescope in the Eifel mountain range in Germany, situated 12 km from the Effelsberg 100-m Radio Telescope.

== Radio telescope ==
Germany's first telescope for radio astronomy, with a diameter of 25 m, was inaugurated on 17 September 1956 on the Stockert. Until 1995 – since 1979 only for student training – it was used by the University of Bonn and the Max Planck Institute for Radio Astronomy. Between 1997 and 2004, the telescope was owned by the digital audio company Creamware and used for inspirational purposes and as a location for their musical festivals called Woodstockert. (Note: The event's name Woodstockert is a play on words on the Woodstock Festival.) In 1999 the installation was listed for its industrial heritage, and since 2005 it is owned by the Nordrhein-Westfalen-Stiftung (NRW-Stiftung), which in 2006 made available €300,000 for restoration. The site is used and taken care of by the Astropeiler Stockert e.V., which has updated the technology and has opened the site to the public.
Astronomical observations have been resumed in 2011, primarily for educational purposes.

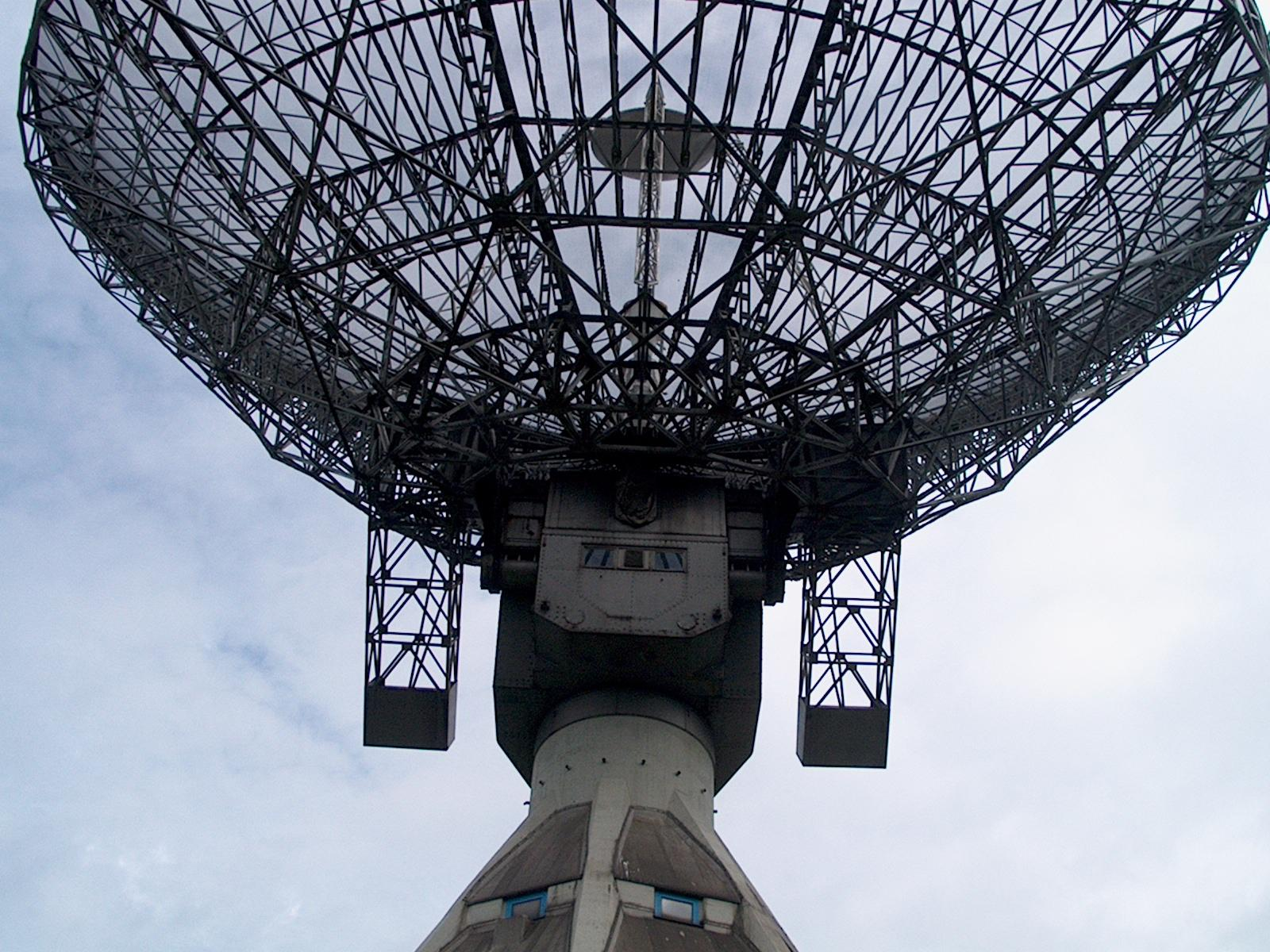
Detail from below

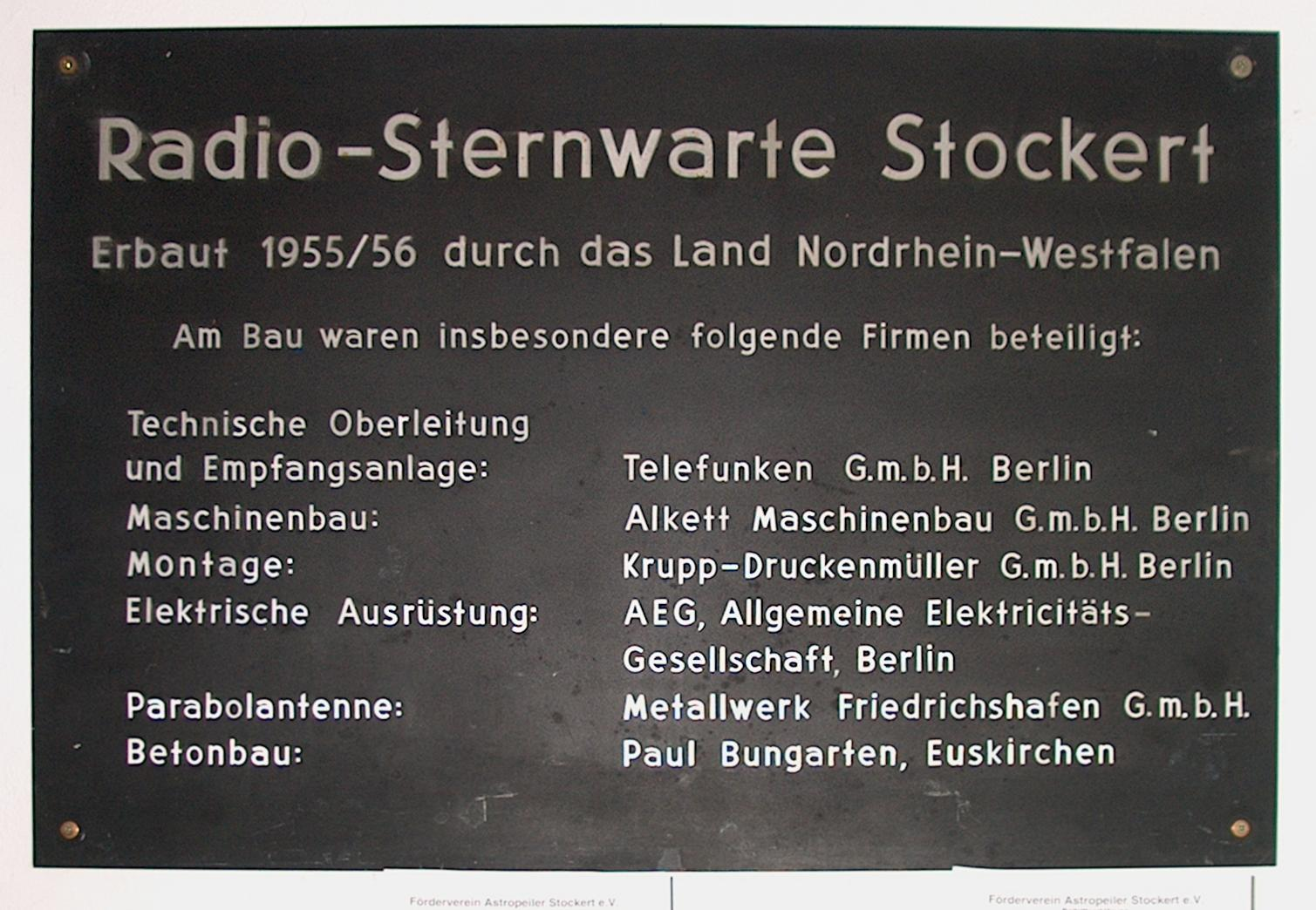
Plaque inside the building

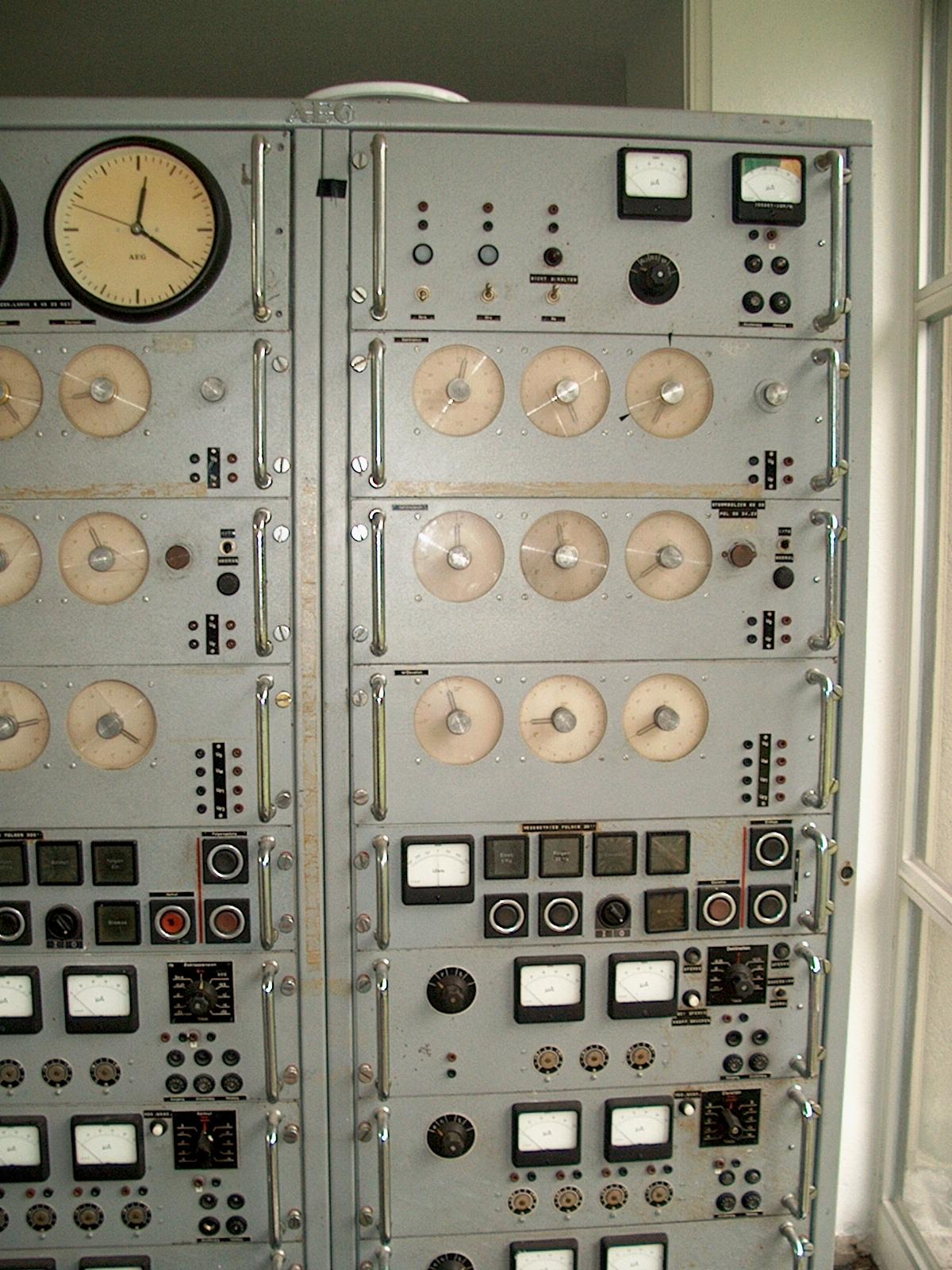
Historical control electronics

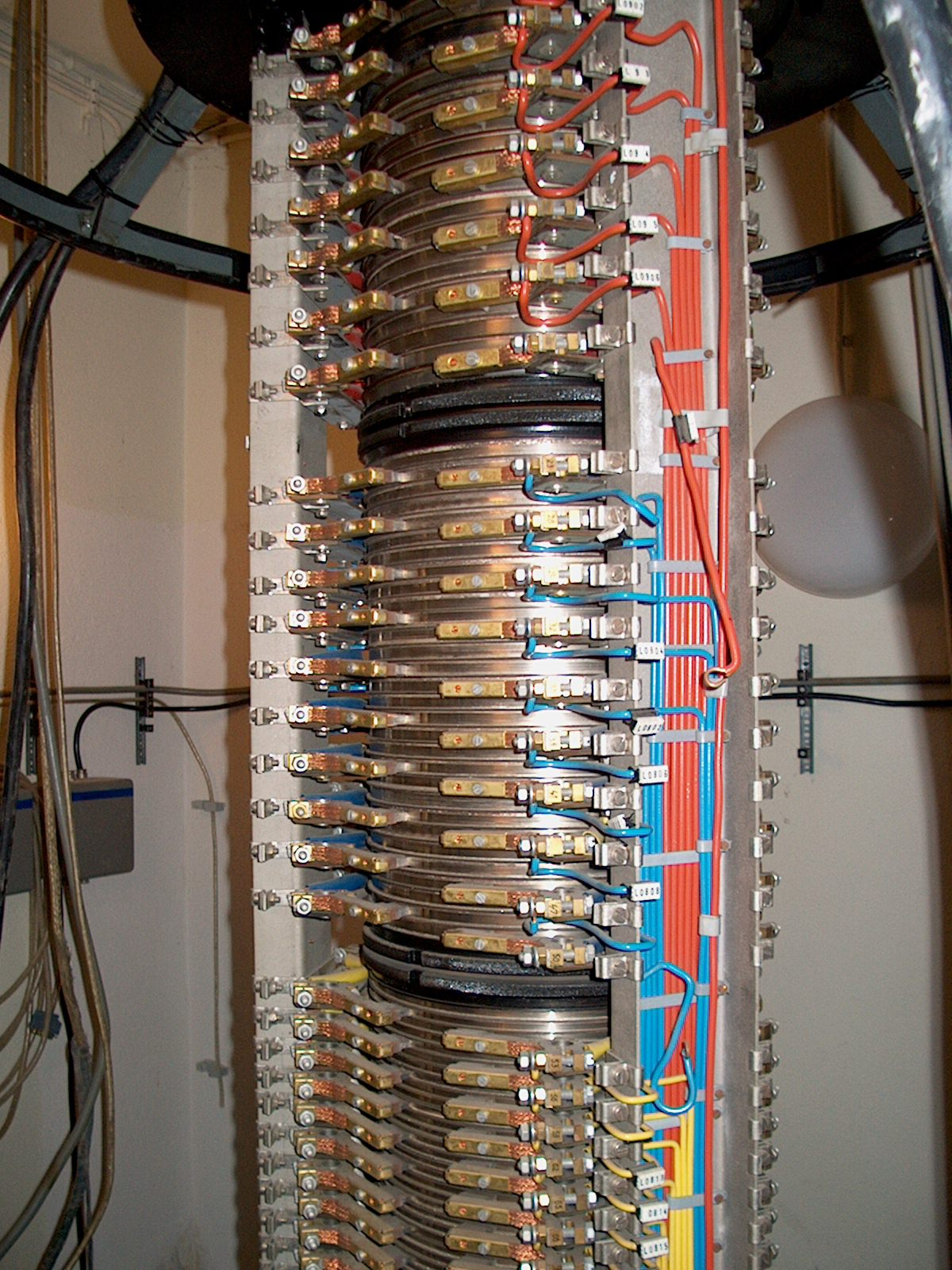
Array of brushes. The brushes allowed the mirror to move continuously in the military use as a radar dish.

== See also ==
Dwingeloo Radio Telescope
