= Effelsberg 100-metre Radio Telescope =

Radio telescope in Bad Münstereifel, Germany

Effelsberg 100-m Radio Telescope
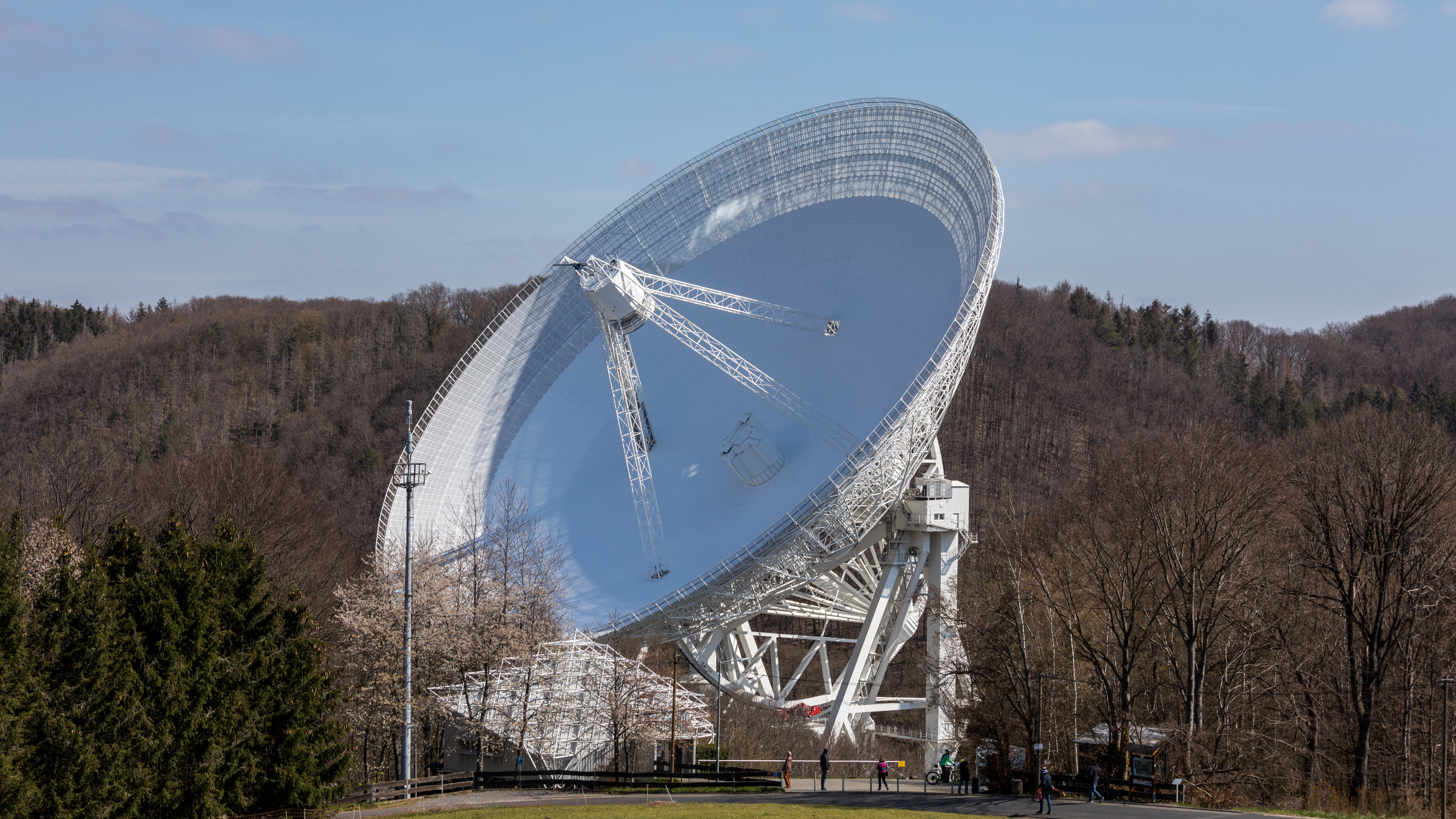
- Location(s): Effelsberg, Bad Münstereifel, Euskirchen, Cologne, North Rhine-Westphalia, Germany
- Coordinates: 50°31′29″N 6°52′58″E
- Altitude: 319 m (1,047 ft)
- Wavelength: 408, 86,000 MHz (73.48, 0.35 cm)
- Diameter: 100 m (328 ft 1 in)
- Collecting area: 7,850 m^{2} (84,500 sq ft)
- Focal length: 30 m (98 ft 5 in)
- Website: www.mpifr-bonn.mpg.de/en/effelsberg
- Location of Effelsberg 100-metre Radio Telescope
- Related media on Commons

The Effelsberg 100-metre Radio Telescope is a radio telescope in the Ahr Hills (part of the Eifel) in Bad Münstereifel, Germany. Inaugurated in 1972, for 29 years the Effelsberg Radio Telescope was the largest fully steerable radio telescope on Earth, surpassing the Lovell Telescope in the UK. In 2000, it was surpassed by the Green Bank Observatory's Robert C. Byrd Green Bank Telescope in Green Bank, US, which has a slightly larger elliptical 100-by-110-metre (330 by 360 ft) aperture.

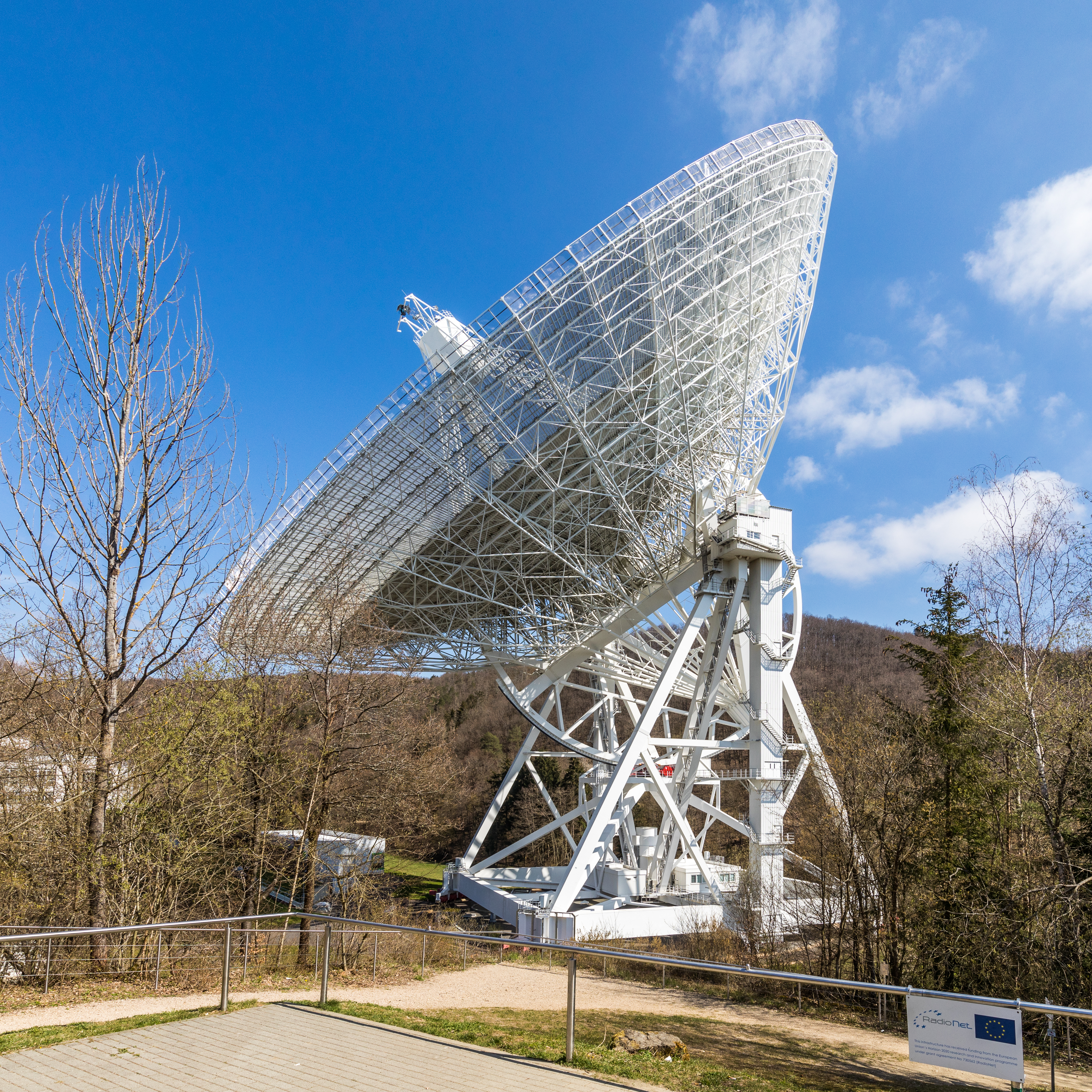
View of the altazimuth mount

== Geography ==
The telescope is located about 1.3 km northeast of Effelsberg, a southeastern part of the town of Bad Münstereifel in North Rhine-Westphalia. It is less than 300 m west of the 398 m high Hünerberg, which is in neighbouring Rhineland-Palatinate. The boundary is a stream, the Effelsberger Bach, which runs only a few metres east of the telescope. The Effelsberger Bach is 6.5 km long, flowing from the Effelsberger Wald into the Sahrbach, which in turn flows south and into the Ahr river.

A hiking path leads past the telescope; in 2004 part of this was turned into a planet trail with information panels about the Solar System with its planets. The trail ends at the 39 cm model of the Sun next to the visitor centre.

== Radio telescope ==
The Effelsberg radio telescope is operated by the Max Planck Institute for Radio Astronomy in Bonn, the radio astronomy institute of the Max-Planck-Gesellschaft. It was constructed from 1968 to 1971 and inaugurated on 1 August 1972. A major technical difficulty in building a radio telescope of 100 m diameter was how to deal with the deformation of the mirror due to gravity when it is rotated to point in a different direction. The mirror must have a precise parabolic shape to focus the radio waves, but a conventionally-designed dish of this size would sag slightly when rotated so the mirror loses its parabolic shape. The Effelsberg telescope uses a novel computer-designed mirror support structure which deforms in such a way that the deformed mirror will always take a parabolic shape. The focus will move during such deformation, and the feed antenna suspended in front of the mirror is moved slightly by the computer control system as the telescope is rotated to keep it at the focus. Tests after completion of the telescope showed that the intended accuracy of the mirror surface of 1 mm had not only been met, but exceeded significantly.

About 45% of the observing time is available to external astronomers. The Effelsberg 100-metre telescope was involved in several surveys, including the one at 408 MHz (73 cm) by Haslam et al.

Technical data of the Effelsberg 100-metre Radio Telescope
| Parameter | Value |
|---|---|
| Reflector Diameter | 100 m |
| Aperture | 7854 m^{2} |
| Number of Surface Elements (Panels) | 2,352 |
| Shape Accuracy of Surface | < 0.5mm |
| Focal Length in Prime Focus | 30 m |
| Secondary Mirror Diameter (Gregory-Reflector) | 6.5 m |
| Aperture Stop | —N/a |
| • in Prime Focus | f/0.3 |
| • in Secondary Focus | f/3.85 |
| Angular Resolution (Beam Width) | —N/a |
| • at 21 cm wavelength (1.4 GHz) | 9.4′ |
| • at 3 cm wavelength (10 GHz) | 1.15′ |
| • at 3.5 mm wavelength (86 GHz) | 10″ |
| Azimuth Track Diameter | 64 m |
| Setting Accuracy of Track | mm |
| Azimuth Range | 480° |
| Maximum Rotation Speed | 30°/min |
| Pointing Accuracy | —N/a |
| • Blind Pointing | 10″ |
| • Repeatability | 2″ |
| Power Output of the 16 Azimuth Drives, each | 10.2 kW |
| Radius of Elevation Gear Track | 28 m |
| Elevation Range | 7° to 94° |
| • during observations | 8.1° to 89° |
| Maximum Tilt Speed | 16°/min |
| Power Output of the 4 Elevation Drives, each | 17.5 kW |
| Total Weight | 3200 t |
| Construction Period | 1968–1971 |
| Height of Track above Sea Level | 319 m |
| Commencement of Operation | 1 August 1972 |
| Constructed by | Arbeitsgemeinschaft Krupp/MAN |

== See also ==
- Stockert Radio Telescope
- Lovell Telescope – at Jodrell Bank Observatory
