= Juan Carlos Stockert =

Argentine physician

Juan Carlos Stockert-Cossu
- Born: March 15, 1940 (age 86); Bahía Blanca, Argentina
- Education: University of Buenos Aires; Autonomous University of Madrid
- Known for: Fluorescence microscopy, cytochemistry, photodynamic and photothermal cancer therapy, molecular modeling
- Awards: Doctor Honoris Causa, National University of Río Cuarto (2008); Doctor Honoris Causa, University of Buenos Aires (2009)
- Scientific career
- Fields: Cell biology, Histochemistry, Cytochemistry, Fluorescence microscopy, PDT, PTT
- Workplaces: Spanish National Research Council (CSIC); Autonomous University of Madrid (UAM)

Juan Carlos Stockert-Cossu (born March 15, 1940, in Bahía Blanca, Argentina) is an Argentine-born physician, researcher and university professor specializing in cytology, histology, histochemistry, fluorescence microscopy and cell biology. He developed most of his scientific career in Spain, where he was a professor at the Autonomous University of Madrid (UAM) and a scientific researcher at the Spanish National Research Council (CSIC). His research has also included photodynamic and photothermal cancer therapy, cell viability assays and, in later stages of his career, molecular modeling of biomolecules and biological pigments.

== Early life ==
Stockert-Cossu was born on March 15, 1940, in Bahía Blanca, Argentina. He studied medicine at the University of Buenos Aires (UBA), where he obtained his medical degree in 1965.

== Research ==
Stockert-Cossu's research has covered cell biology, histochemistry, fluorescence microscopy, cytochemical methods, photodynamic therapy, cell viability assays, and, in later stages of his career, molecular modeling of biomolecules and biological pigments.

His work in fluorescence microscopy included its application to cell biology and histochemistry, and he was co-author of the comprehensive handbook Fluorescence Microscopy in Life Sciences (2017).

He also conducted research on photodynamic processes and their applications in cancer research, including studies of photosensitizers, reactive oxygen species, cellular localization and mechanisms of photodynamic cell damage.

His research also included tetrazolium-based cell viability assays and studies of MTT and formazan products. In 2012, he investigated the intracellular localization of the MTT formazan product, and in 2018 he co-authored a review of tetrazolium salts and formazan products in cell biology.

In the later stages of his career, his work expanded into molecular modeling and biophysics of biomolecules and biological pigments, including graphitic structures and eumelanin models. In 2023, he published a study with Marcelo N. Felix-Pozzi on the molecular modeling of graphene and eumelanin structures.

In 2026, he published an extensive scientific review with Alfonso Blázquez-Castro addressing melanoma therapy in relation to melanin structure, biophysics and histochemistry.

== Career ==
From 1965 to 1968, Stockert-Cossu held a research fellowship from the Argentine League for the Fight against Cancer (LALCEC) at the Institute of Hematological Research of the National Academy of Medicine in Buenos Aires, where he worked on cytogenetics and electron microscopy in experimental leukemia. From 1968 to 1970, he held an International Agency for Research on Cancer (IARC)/World Health Organization fellowship at the CSIC Institute of Cell Biology in Madrid, followed by a CSIC research fellowship in 1970.

From 1971 to 1973, he was Senior Teaching Assistant in the Department of Histology and at the Center for Research in Reproduction (CIR), Faculty of Medicine, UBA. From 1973 to 1976, he held an Alexander von Humboldt Research Fellowship at the Max Planck Institute for Biology in Tübingen, where he worked on cytochemistry and gene regulation in polytene chromosomes.

In 1976, Stockert-Cossu returned to Spain, joining the CSIC Institute of Cell Biology and becoming a professor of Cytology and Histology at UAM, where he directed the Department of Cytology and Histology. In 1987, he became a Scientific Researcher at CSIC through competitive examination and remained in this position until his retirement in 2010.

Between 1979 and 1995, he was also a visiting researcher in CSIC–Max Planck scientific cooperation programs.

After his transition from a professorial position at the UAM to a research position at CSIC, Stockert-Cossu continued to participate in postgraduate teaching at the Autonomous University of Madrid under an individual CSIC–UAM institutional agreement. In this capacity, he was appointed Honorary Professor by the Rector of the UAM.

== Awards and honours ==
Stockert-Cossu was awarded the degree of Doctor Honoris Causa by the National University of Río Cuarto (UNRC) in 2008.

He was awarded the title of Doctor Honoris Causa by the University of Buenos Aires (UBA), upon proposal of its Faculty of Veterinary Sciences. The initiative was approved by the UBA Superior Council.

== Post-retirement ==
After his retirement from CSIC in 2010, Stockert-Cossu continued his scientific activities as an associate researcher with the Institute of Health and Environmental Sciences of the Prosama Foundation in Argentina and as a scientific adviser to SkinTarget Biological Developments, located at the Madrid Scientific Park.

== Selected works ==
- Stockert JC, Blázquez-Castro A. Fluorescence Microscopy in Life Sciences. Bentham Science Publishers; 2017. doi:10.2174/97816810851801170101. ISBN 978-1-68108-519-7.
- Stockert JC, Horobin RW, Colombo LL, Blázquez-Castro A. “Tetrazolium salts and formazan products in Cell Biology: Viability assessment, fluorescence imaging, and labeling perspectives.” Acta Histochemica. 2018;120(3):159–167. doi:10.1016/j.acthis.2018.02.005.
- Stockert JC, Felix-Pozzi MN. “Updating curvature of graphitic materials: Molecular modeling studies on the spiral structure of graphene and eumelanin models.” In: Advances in Biology. Vol. 2, Chapter 4. Nova Science Publishers; 2023:173–205. ISBN 979-8-88697-422-5.
- Stockert JC, Horobin RW. “Prebiotic RNA self-assembling and the origin of life: Mechanistic and molecular modeling rationale for explaining the prebiotic origin and replication of RNA.” Acta Histochemica. 2025;127:152226. doi:10.1016/j.acthis.2024.152226.
- Stockert JC, Blázquez-Castro A. “Updating melanoma therapy regarding melanin structure: Advances and proposals from biophysics, histochemistry and cell biology.” Acta Histochemica. 2026;128(3):152355. doi:10.1016/j.acthis.2026.152355.
