= Bad Münstereifel =

Place in North Rhine-Westphalia, Germany

- Town
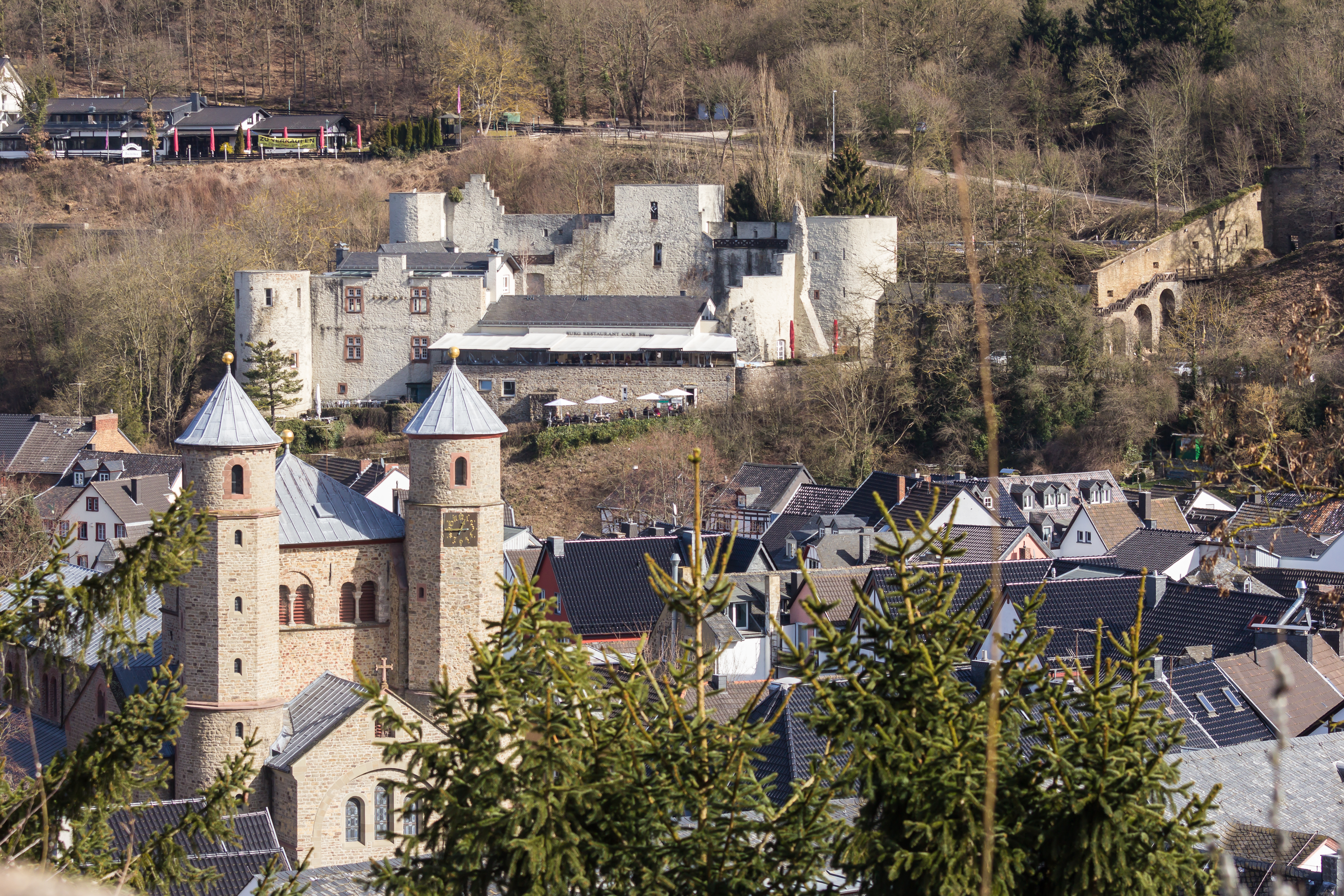

- Flag Coat of arms

- Location of Bad Münstereifel within Euskirchen district
- Interactive map of Bad Münstereifel
- Location within Germany Location within North Rhine-Westphalia
- Coordinates: 50°33′11″N 06°45′58″E
- Country: Germany
- State: North Rhine-Westphalia
- Admin. region: Köln
- District: Euskirchen

Government
  - Mayor (2025–30): Sebastian Glatzel (SPD)

Area
  - Total: 150.83 km^{2} (58.24 sq mi)
- Elevation: 434 m (1,424 ft)

Population (2025-12-31)
  - Total: 18,375
  - Density: 121.83/km^{2} (315.53/sq mi)
- Time zone: UTC+01:00 (CET)
  - Summer (DST): UTC+02:00 (CEST)
- Postal codes: 53902
- Dialling codes: 02253, 02257
- Vehicle registration: EU, SLE
- Website: www.bad-muenstereifel.de

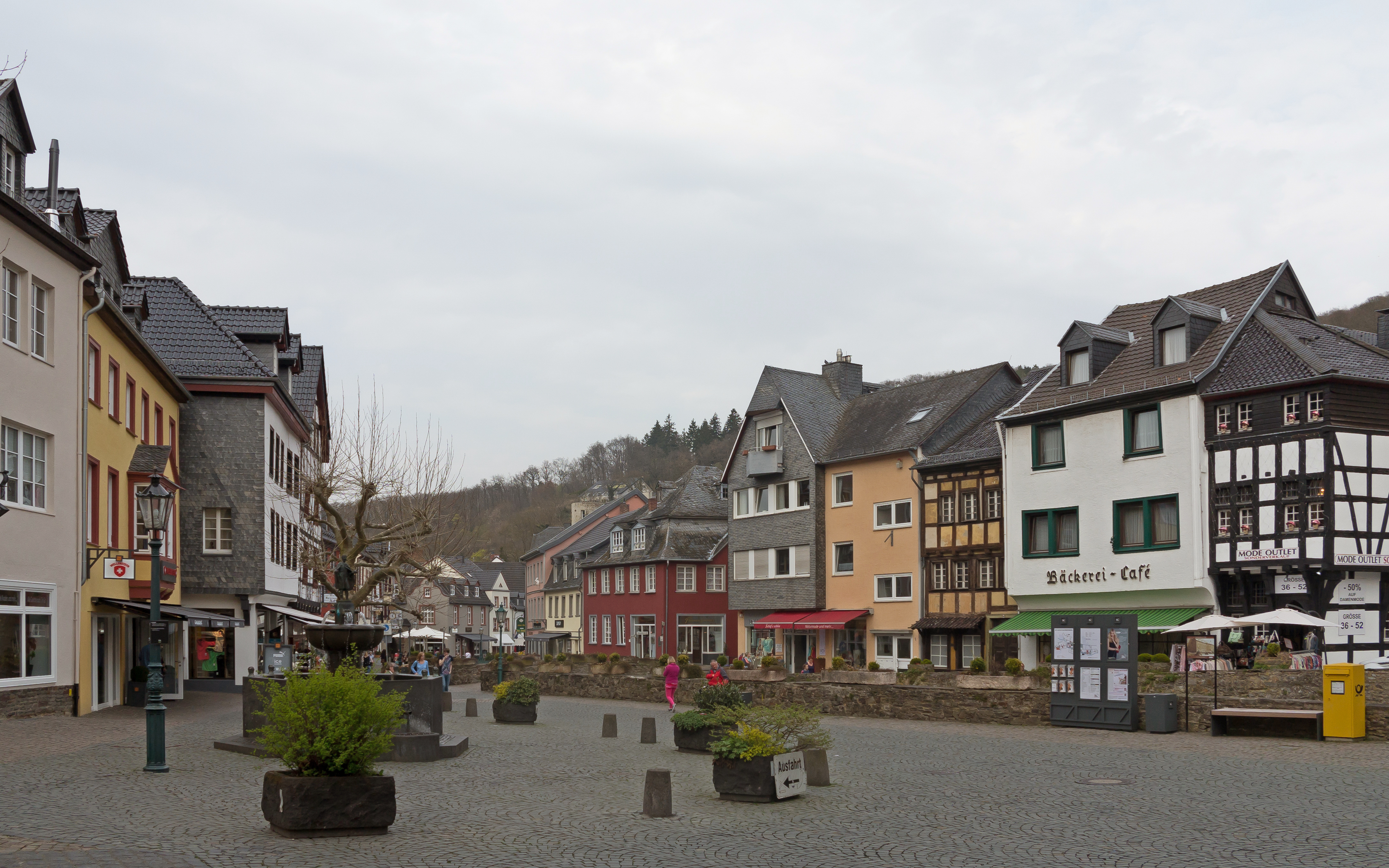
Bad Münstereifel, Markt (market place)

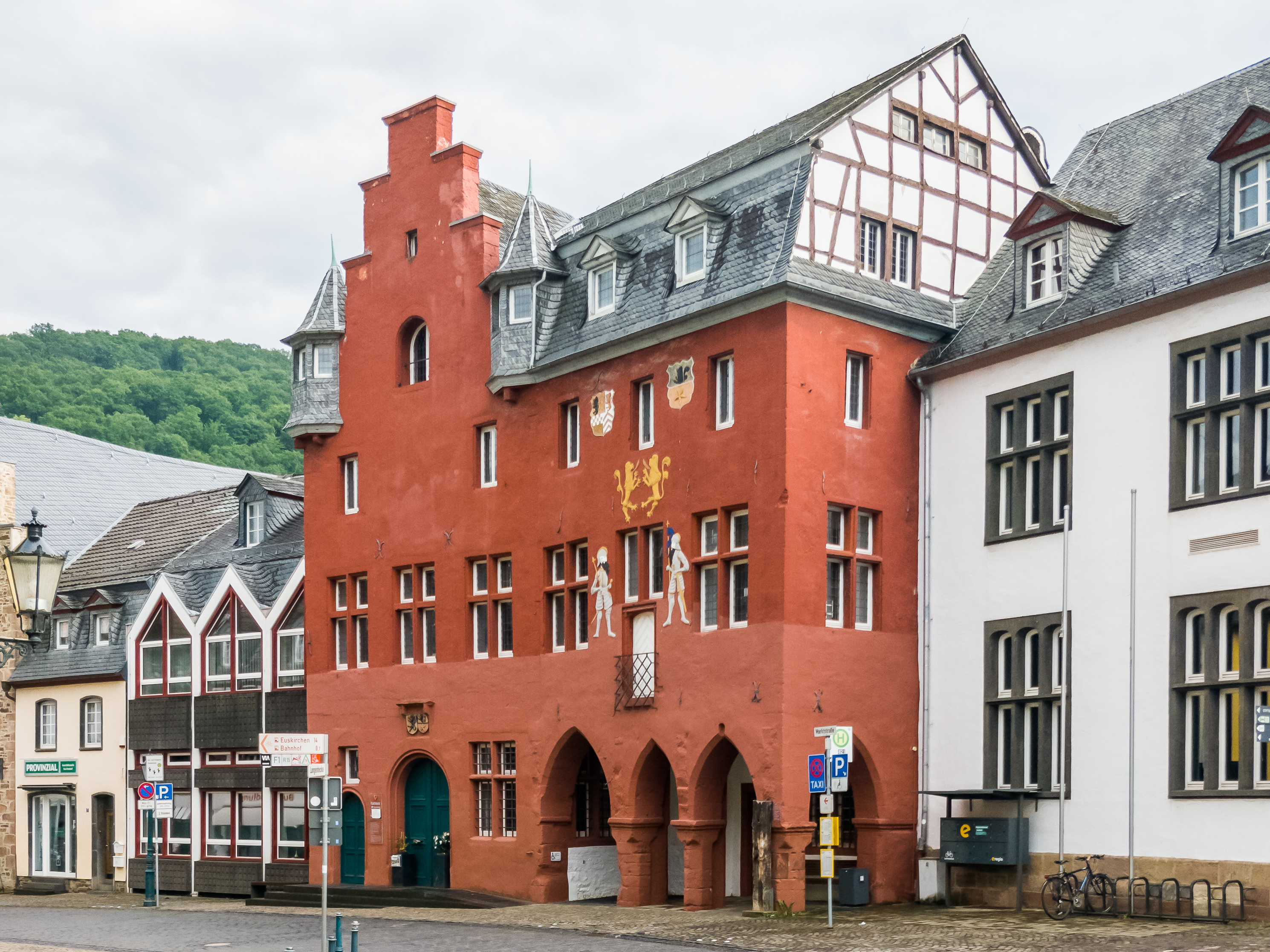
Bad Münstereifel, town hall

Bad Münstereifel (German pronunciation: [baːt mʏnstɐˈʔaɪfl̩]) is a historical spa town in the district of Euskirchen, Germany, with about 18,000 inhabitants, situated in the far southwest of the German state of North Rhine-Westphalia. The little town is one of only a few historical towns in the southwest of North Rhine-Westphalia, and because of this is often overcrowded by tourists throughout spring and summer.

== Geography ==
=== Location ===
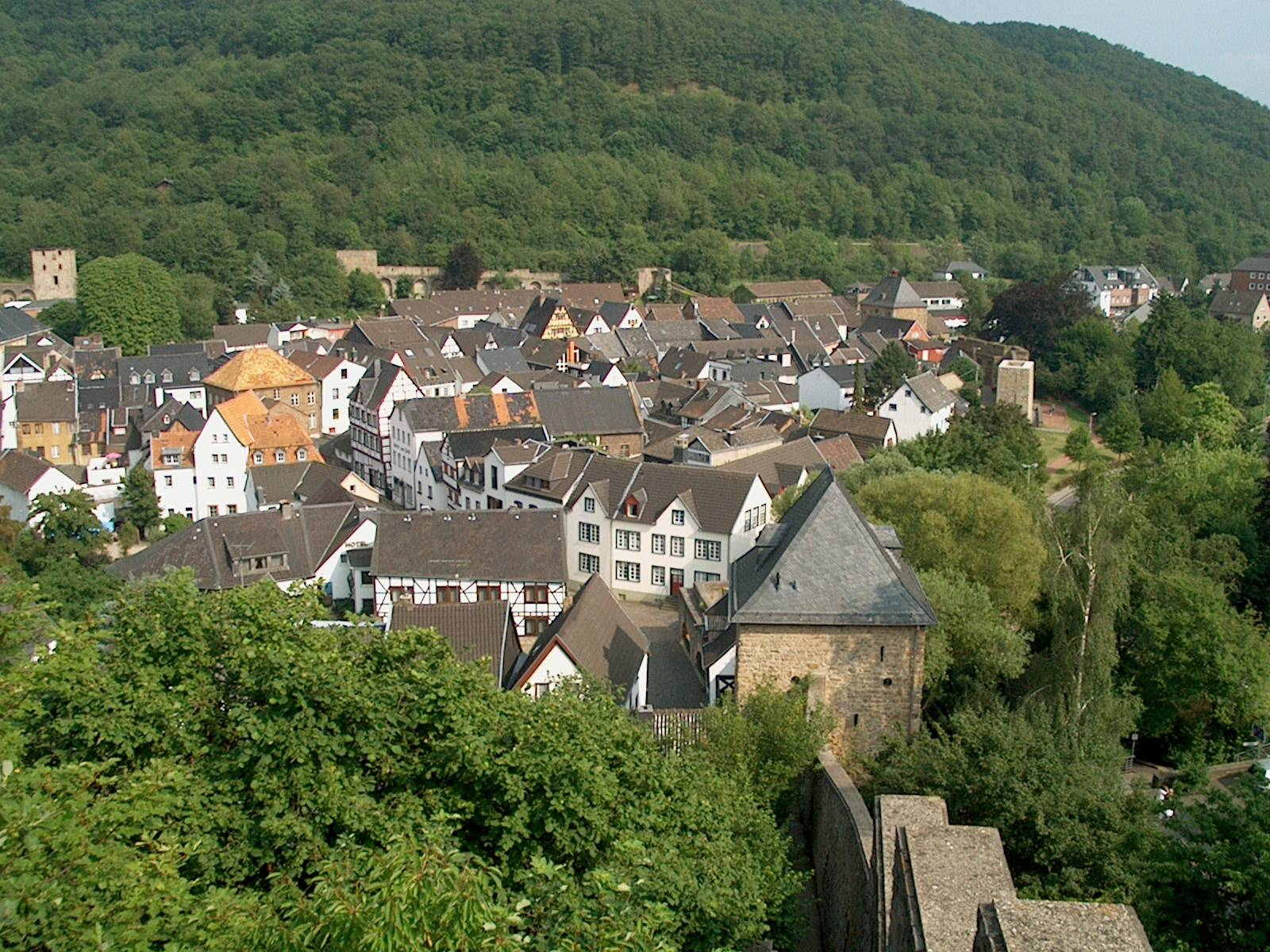
View of the town

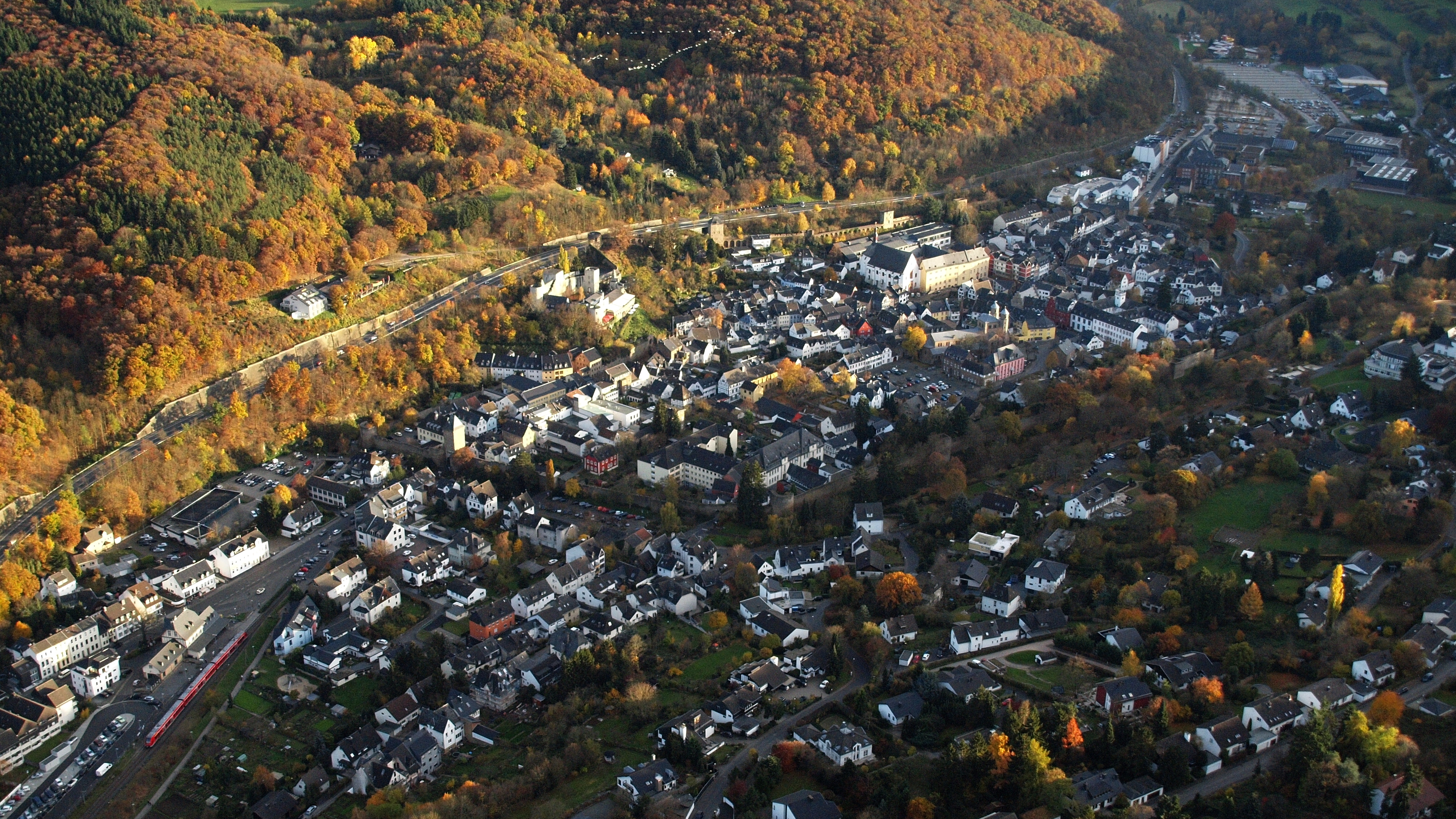
Aerial view (2015)

Bad Münstereifel lies about 30 kilometres (19 mi) southwest of Bonn and around ten (both as the crow flies) south of the county town of Euskirchen in the Münstereifel Forest, a part of the Eifel mountains. The river Erft flows through the town. It has a borough of around 151 km^{2} (58 sq mi) in area at heights of 200 to 586.1 m (656 to 1,923 ft) above sea level. The latter is the height of the Michelsberg, which is the highest point in the borough and rises in the northwestern part of the Ahr Hills (another region of the Eifel).

The borough is around 60 percent forested, several woods are designated as so-called ancient forest (Urwald). Over 200 km (120 mi) of trails enable access to the low mountain uplands, which are about 25 km (16 mi) from the Eifel National Park.

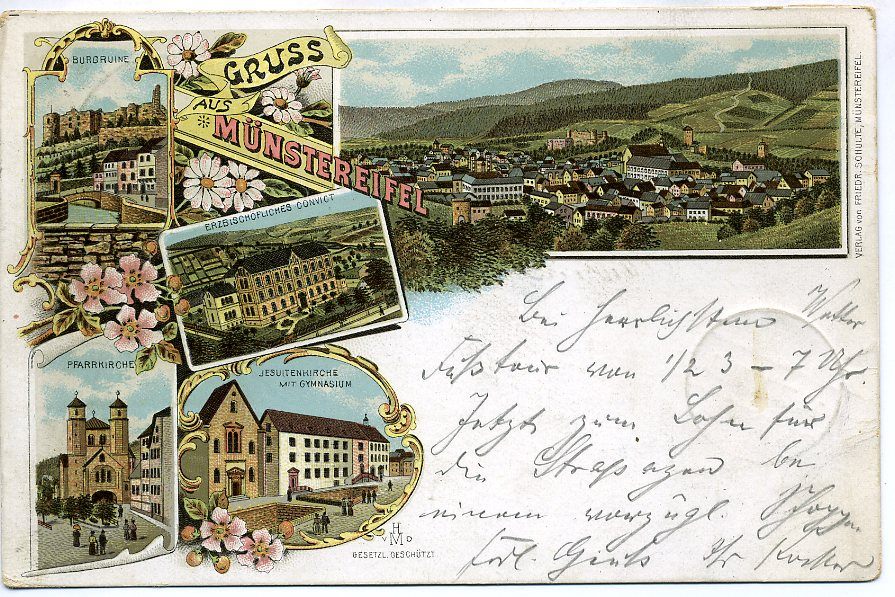
1897 picture postcard

Due to its location in the Erft valley the old town of Bad Münstereifel, tourist and economic facilities, railways and streets were severely damaged by the floods 2021. Five persons died while these floods.

=== Subdivisions ===
Arloff, Bergrath, Berresheim, Effelsberg, Eichen, Eicherscheid, Ellesheim, Esch, Eschweiler, Gilsdorf, Hilterscheid, Hohn, Holzem, Honerath, Houverath, Hummerzheim, Hünkhoven, Iversheim, Kalkar, Bad Münstereifel, Kirspenich, Kolvenbach, Kop Nück, Langscheid, Lanzerath, Lethert, Limbach, Lingscheiderhof, Mahlberg, Maulbach, Mutscheid, Neichen, Nitterscheid, Nöthen, Odesheim, Ohlerath, Reckerscheid, Rodert, Rupperath, Sasserath, Scheuerheck, Scheuren, Schönau, Soller, Vollmert, Wald, Willerscheid, Witscheiderhof

== Population ==
Historical population

Year	Pop.	±% p.a.
1965	13,725	—
1970	14,164	+0.63%
1975	14,335	+0.24%
1980	14,564	+0.32%
1985	14,939	+0.51%
1990	16,163	+1.59%
1995	17,718	+1.85%

Year	Pop.	±% p.a.
2000	18,499	+0.87%
2005	19,003	+0.54%
2010	18,449	−0.59%
2015	17,367	−1.20%
2020	17,387	+0.02%
2025	18,375	+1.11%

Source: Landesdatabank Nordrhein-Westfalen

== Education ==
Bad Münstereifel is the seat of SIGNO innovation society Eifel Association, Association of the greatest inventors in Germany. Signo is a project of the Federal Ministry of Economics and Technology. Joined the Association is a youth and children's department, may acquire in the children and young people in a club's workshop, the basic knowledge of technology.

Bad Münstereifel has four elementary schools in the main town as well as the subdistricts of Arloff, Mutscheid, and Houverath. A Hauptschule and Realschule share facilities, while the city has two Gymnasium: the public St. Michael-Gymnasium and the diocesan-run St.-Angela-Gymnasium. Furthermore, the Apostolic school of the Legionaries of Christ has its seat in the city.

Since 1976, the city is also home to the University of Applied Sciences for the Administration of Justice of North Rhine-Westphalia. There are also several private training facilities in the city, including the Kurt-Schumacher-Academy of the Friedrich-Ebert-Stiftung and the House of Labor Security of the Trade Association for Electrical and Precision Engineering. There is also a house of the Youth Red Cross as an educational facility for the National Association (North Division).

Bad Münstereifel has a public library with a stock of 16,000 media.

== Local council ==
The local council has 36 seats, the elections were held in September 2025.

- CDU: 13 seats
- SPD: 9 seats
- FDP: 2 seats
- UWV: 3 seats
- Alliance 90/The Greens: 4 seats
- AfD: 5 seats

== Notable people and gatherings ==
- Heino (born 1938), the folk-singer has lived in the town. From 1996 to 2012 he operated a cafe there.
- Friedrich Joseph Haass, (1780–1853), the "holy doctor of Moscow", was born in Bad Münstereifel.
- Wilhelm Mohr (1838-1888), German journalist
- Christopher Becker (born 1980), German film director, screenwriter and film producer

The Portuguese Socialist Party, one of the two main Portuguese parties, was founded here in 1973 with the guidance of the Social Democratic Party of Germany, who wanted to create a political force capable of keeping Portugal a member of NATO.

== Other personalities associated with the town ==
- Otto Graf Lambsdorff (1926–2009), politician, former Bundesminister für Wirtschaft (Minister of Economic Affairs) and chairman of the FDP, lived in the district of Eschweiler.

== International relations ==
Bad Münstereifel is twinned with:

- Ashford, United Kingdom
- Fougères, France.

== See also ==
- Alte Burg (Bad Münstereifel) – the site of an old refuge castle
- Effelsberg 100-m Radio Telescope
